= Our Lady of Lebanon Cathedral =

Our Lady of Lebanon Cathedral may refer to:

- Our Lady of Lebanon Cathedral, São Paulo, Brazil
- Our Lady of Lebanon Procathedral, Bogotá, Colombia
- Our Lady of Lebanon Maronite Cathedral (Paris), France
- Our Lady of Valvanera Cathedral, Mexico City, seat of the Maronite Catholic Eparchy of Our Lady of the Martyrs of Lebanon in Mexico
- Our Lady of Lebanon Maronite Cathedral (Brooklyn), United States
- Our Lady of Mt. Lebanon-St. Peter Cathedral (Los Angeles), United States

== See also ==
For other churches named after Our Lady of Lebanon, see:

- Shrine of Our Lady of the Cedars, Johannesburg, South Africa
- Basilica and National Shrine of Our Lady of Lebanon (North Jackson, Ohio), United States
- Nuestra Señora del Líbano, Montevideo, Uruguay
- Our Lady of Lebanon § Churches, schools, and shrines dedicated to Our Lady of Lebanon
