= Our Lady of Lebanon =

Marian shrine in Lebanon

Shrine of Our Lady of Lebanon
- مزار سيدة لبنان
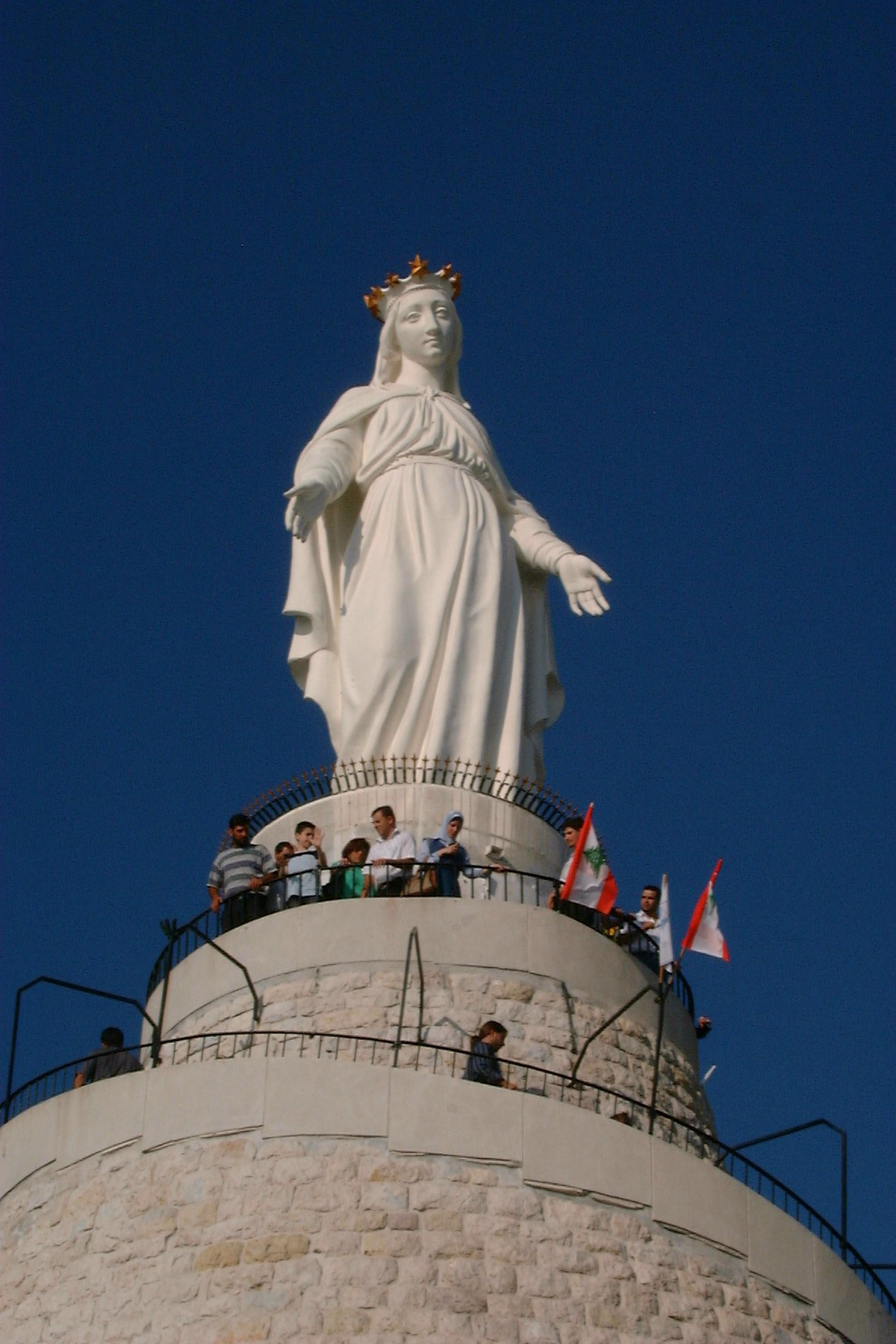
- Shrine of Our Lady of Lebanon

Religion
- Ownership: Maronite Church
- Patron: Our Lady of Lebanon; Lebanon; Lebanese people
- Feast: 1st Sunday of May

Location
- Location: Harissa
- Country: Lebanon
- Interactive map of Shrine of Our Lady of Lebanon
- Administration: Congregation of Maronite Lebanese Missionaries

Architecture
- Style: Blessed Virgin Mary with outstretched hands, bronze crown
- Creator: 33°58′54″N 35°39′5″E
- Completed: 1904

Our Lady of Lebanon
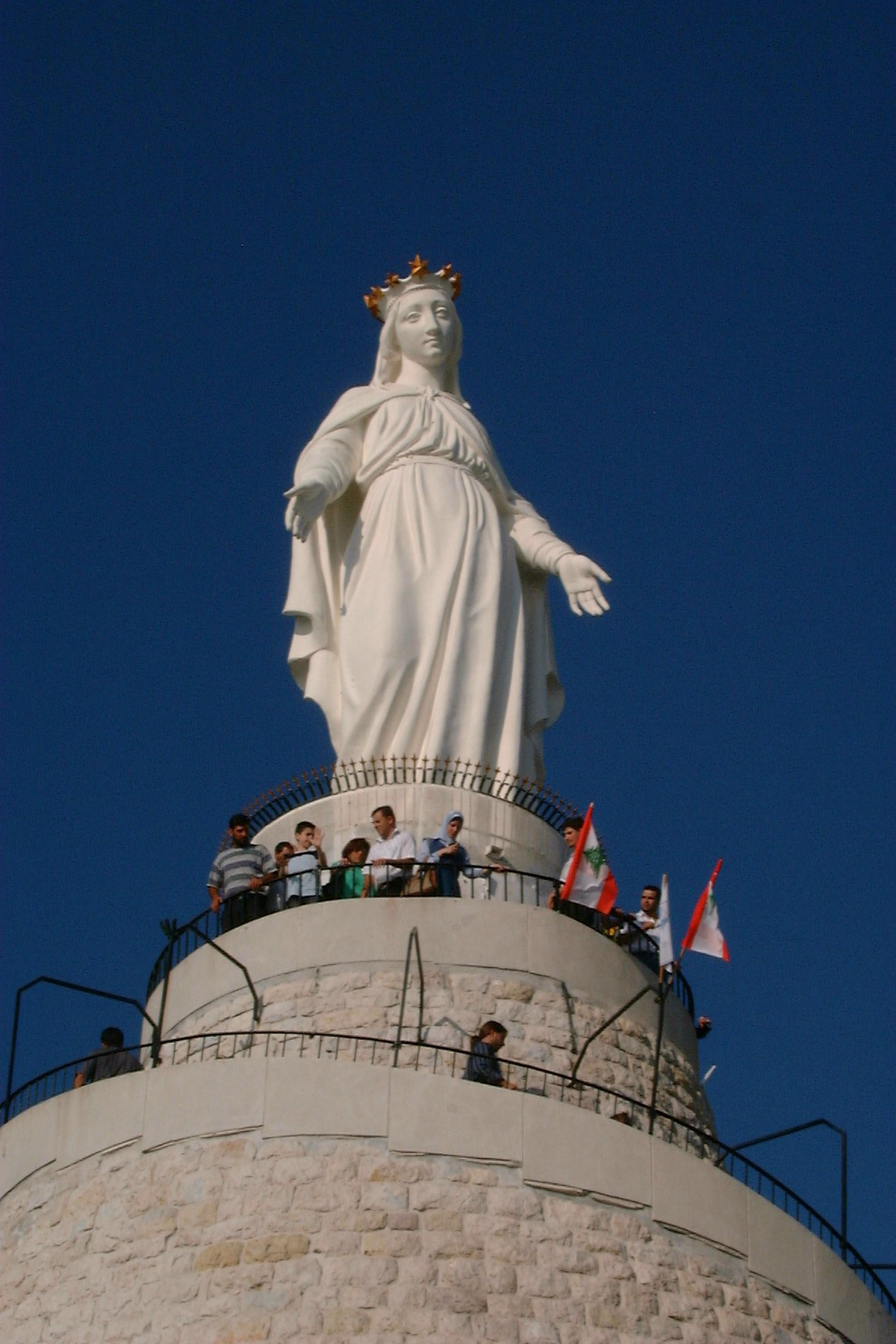

Queen and Patroness of Lebanon
- Venerated in: Latin Catholicism; Eastern Catholicism; Maronite Church; Melkite Greek Church
- Major shrine: Shrine of Our Lady of Lebanon, Harissa, Lebanon
- Feast: 1st Sunday of May
- Attributes: Blessed Virgin Mary with outstretched hands, bronze crown
- Patronage: Lebanon and Lebanese people

The Shrine of Our Lady of Lebanon (also known as Our Lady of Harissa, Arabic: سيدة لبنان, Sayyidat Lubnān) is a Marian shrine and a pilgrimage site in the village of Harissa in Lebanon.

The shrine belongs to the Maronite Patriarchate who entrusted its administration to the Congregation of Maronite Lebanese Missionaries since its foundation in 1904 and also to the Jesuit Lucien Cattin, according to Christian Taoutel, a Lebanese historian at Saint Joseph University. One of the most important shrines in the world honoring Mary, Mother of Jesus, the shrine is highlighted by a huge, 15-tonne bronze statue measuring 8.5 m high and with a diameter of 5 m. The Virgin Mary is shown stretching her hands towards Beirut.

The Shrine of Our Lady of Lebanon draws millions of faithful Christians, Druze, and Muslims from all over the world. Its golden jubilee in 1954 was also the centenary of the proclamation of the Catholic dogma of the Immaculate Conception. During these celebrations, Pope Pius XII sent his representative, Cardinal Angelo Roncalli (later Pope John XXIII) to Lebanon. Pope John Paul II visited the Shrine in 1997. Pope Leo XIV visited the shrine in 2025.

The Congregation of Maronite Lebanese Missionaries, responsible for shrine administration, works at reinforcing relations among all local Churches, Christian communities and apostolic movements.

The Lebanese Christians as well as the Druze and Muslims, all have a special devotion to Mary, Mother of Jesus. The Maronite Patriarch of Antioch named her the "Queen of Lebanon" in 1908 upon the Shrine's completion. Overlooking the coast off Jounieh, the shrine has become a major tourist attraction where tourists take the gondola lift, the Téléphérique, from the city of Jounieh to Harissa.

== History ==
The Statue of Our Lady of Lebanon is a French-made, 13-ton statue, made of bronze and painted white, of the Virgin Mary. It was erected in 1907 on top of a hill, 650 meters above sea level, in the village of Harissa, 20 km north of Beirut in honor of Our Lady of Lebanon. The land was made up of seven sections that were assembled on top of the stone base, which had a bottom perimeter of 64m, an upper perimeter of 12m and with an overall height of 20m. The height of the statue is 8.50m while its diameter is 5.50m. The statue and the shrine were inaugurated in 1908, and it has become a major pilgrimage destination. The statue was donated by a French woman who remains anonymous.

== Papal Visits ==
Pope John Paul II visited the shrine when he made an official visit to Lebanon on May 10, 1997. He conducted a mass in the modern Basilica. On December 8, 1998, the Vatican announced that the World Day of the Sick would be celebrated on February 11, 1999, at Our Lady of Lebanon in Harissa. Pope John Paul II prayed that Our Lady of Lebanon who had watched over the agonizing suffering of the Lebanese people could help all those who were suffering in the world.

Pope Benedict XVI launched an appeal for peace in Lebanon and Gaza by invoking the protection of Our Lady of Lebanon on January 28, 2007. He said, "To Christians in Lebanon, I repeat the exhortation to be promoters of real dialogue between the various communities, and upon everyone I invoke the protection of Our Lady of Lebanon."

The Apostolic Nuncio to Lebanon as well as the residences of four Eastern Catholic Churches patriarchs reside in the vicinity of the shrine of Our Lady of Lebanon.

On December 1, 2025, Pope Leo XIV met with bishops, priests, consecrated men and women, and pastoral workers at the shrine during his official visit to Lebanon

== Image gallery ==
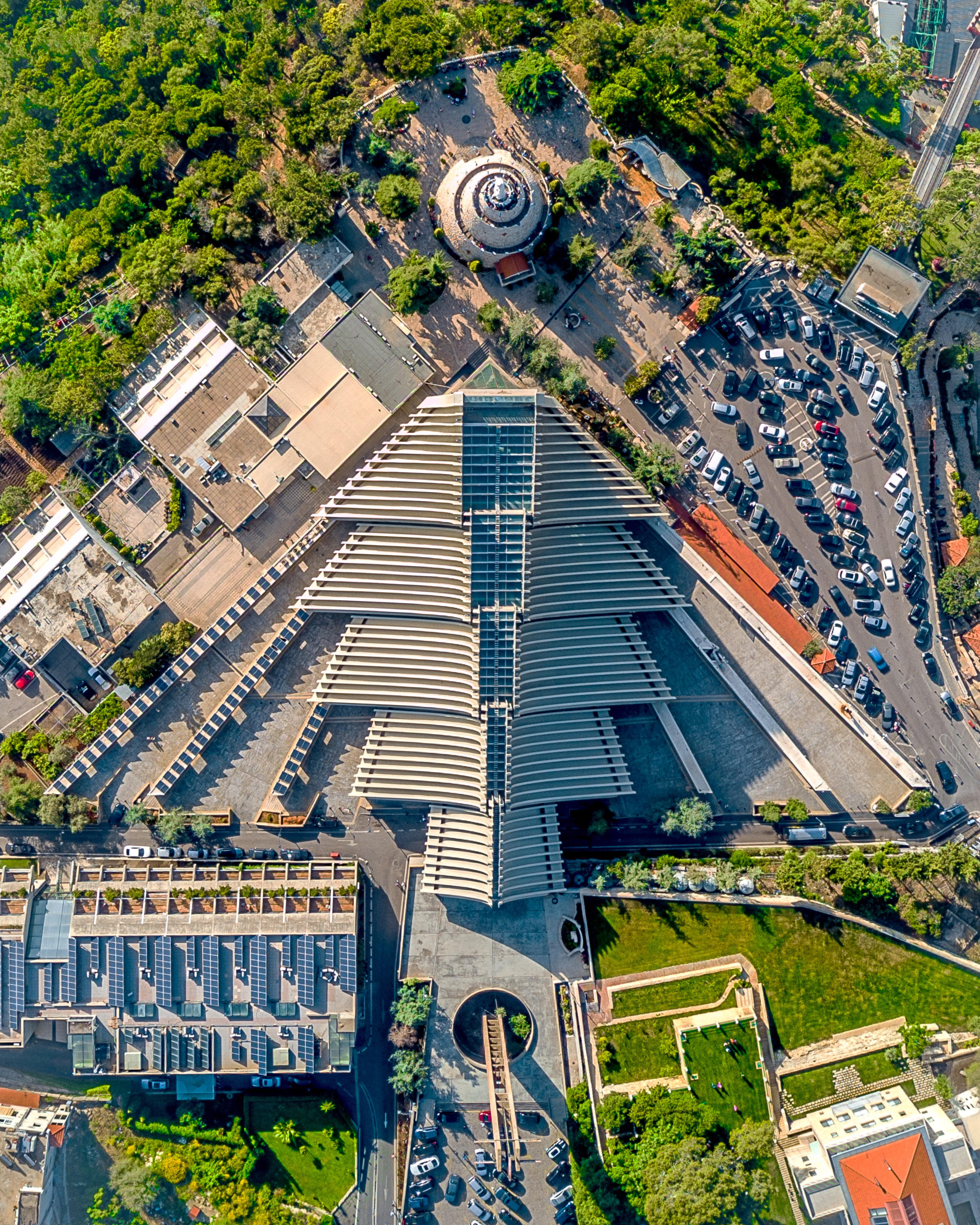
Our Lady of Lebanon captured from above, by Mikhael Bitar

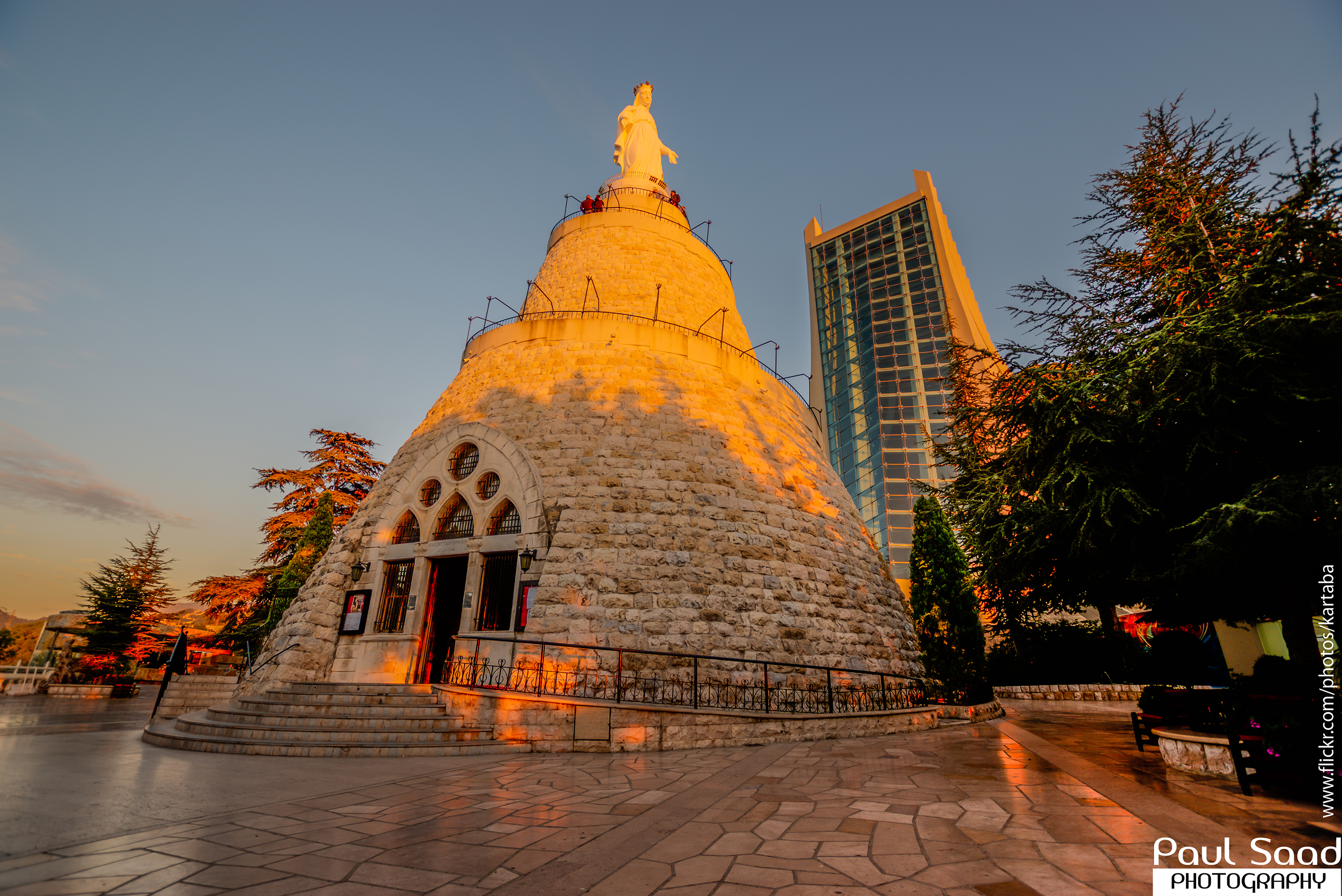
The chapel is surmounted by the statue of Our Lady of Lebanon

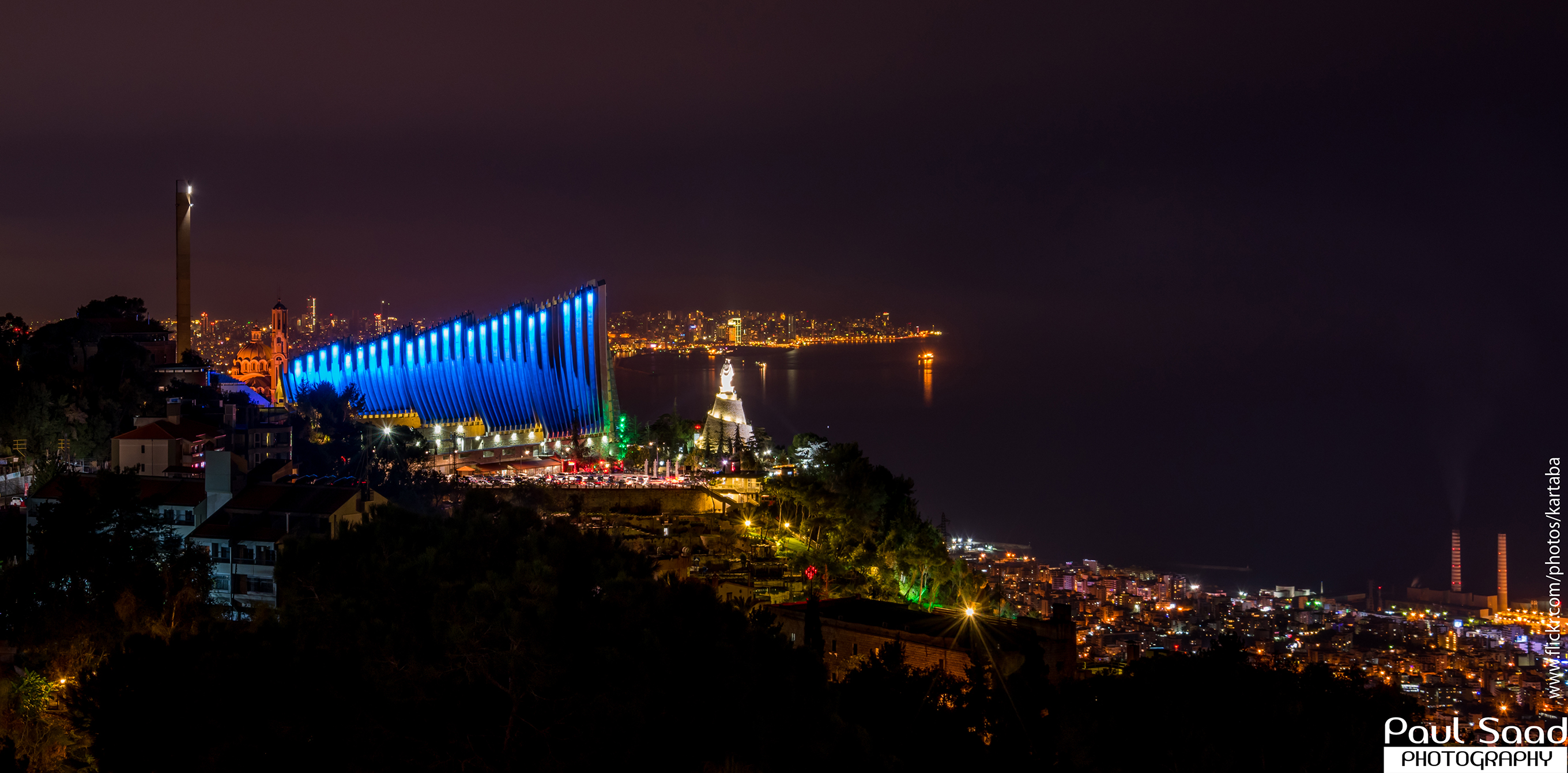
Harissa Cathedral From Bat'ha

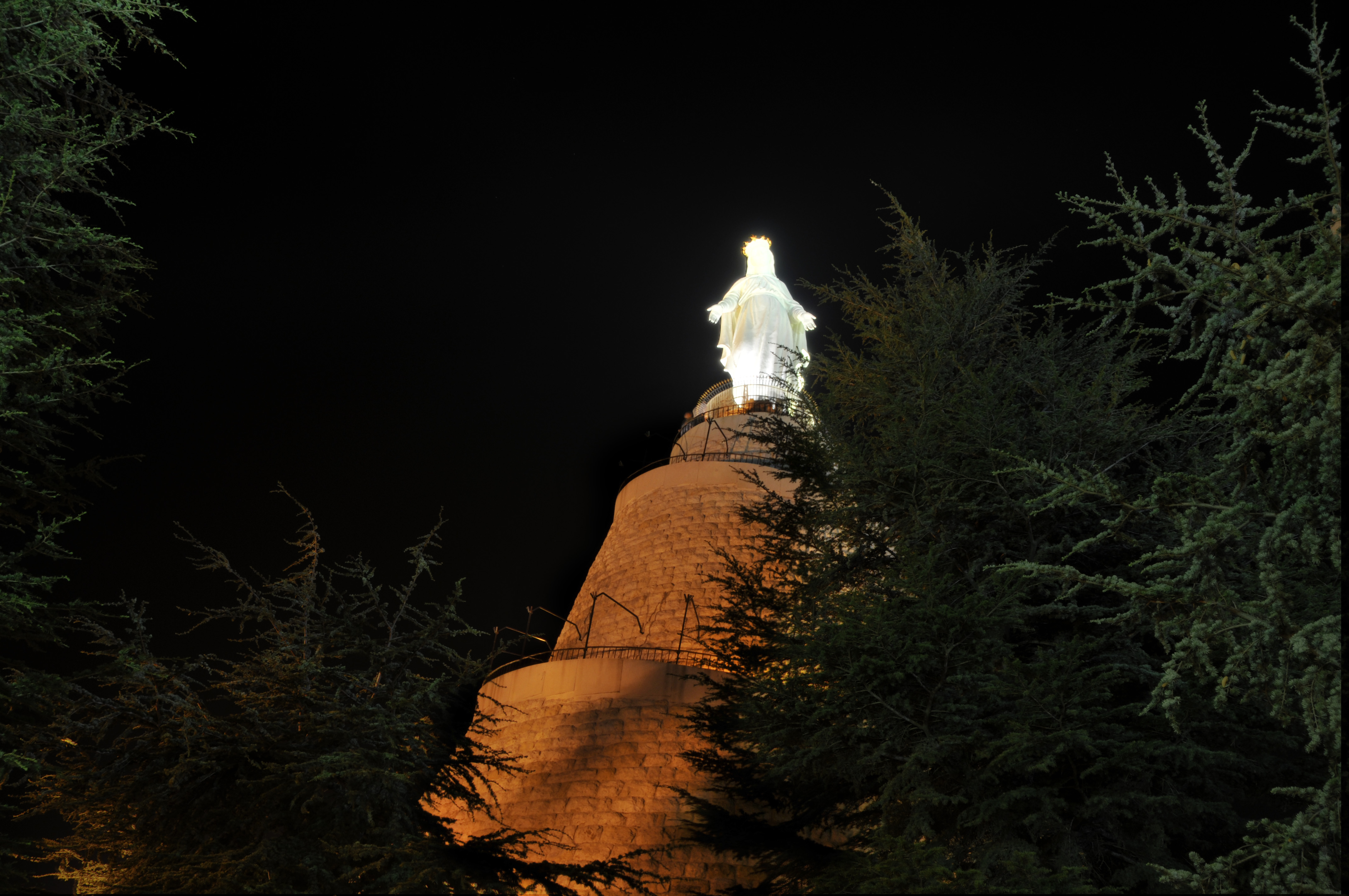
Shrine at night

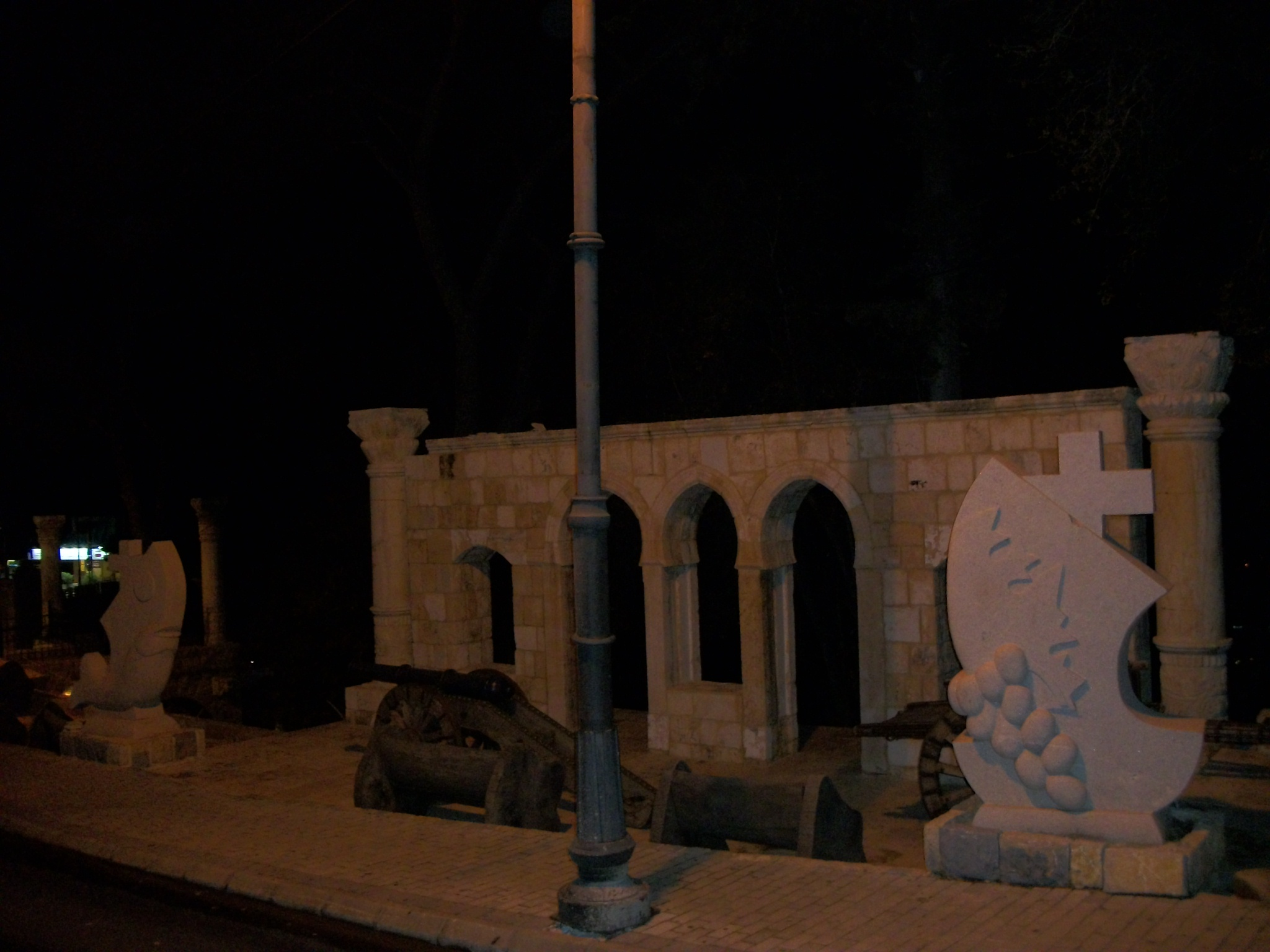
Entrance of Sanctuary Our Lady of Lebanon

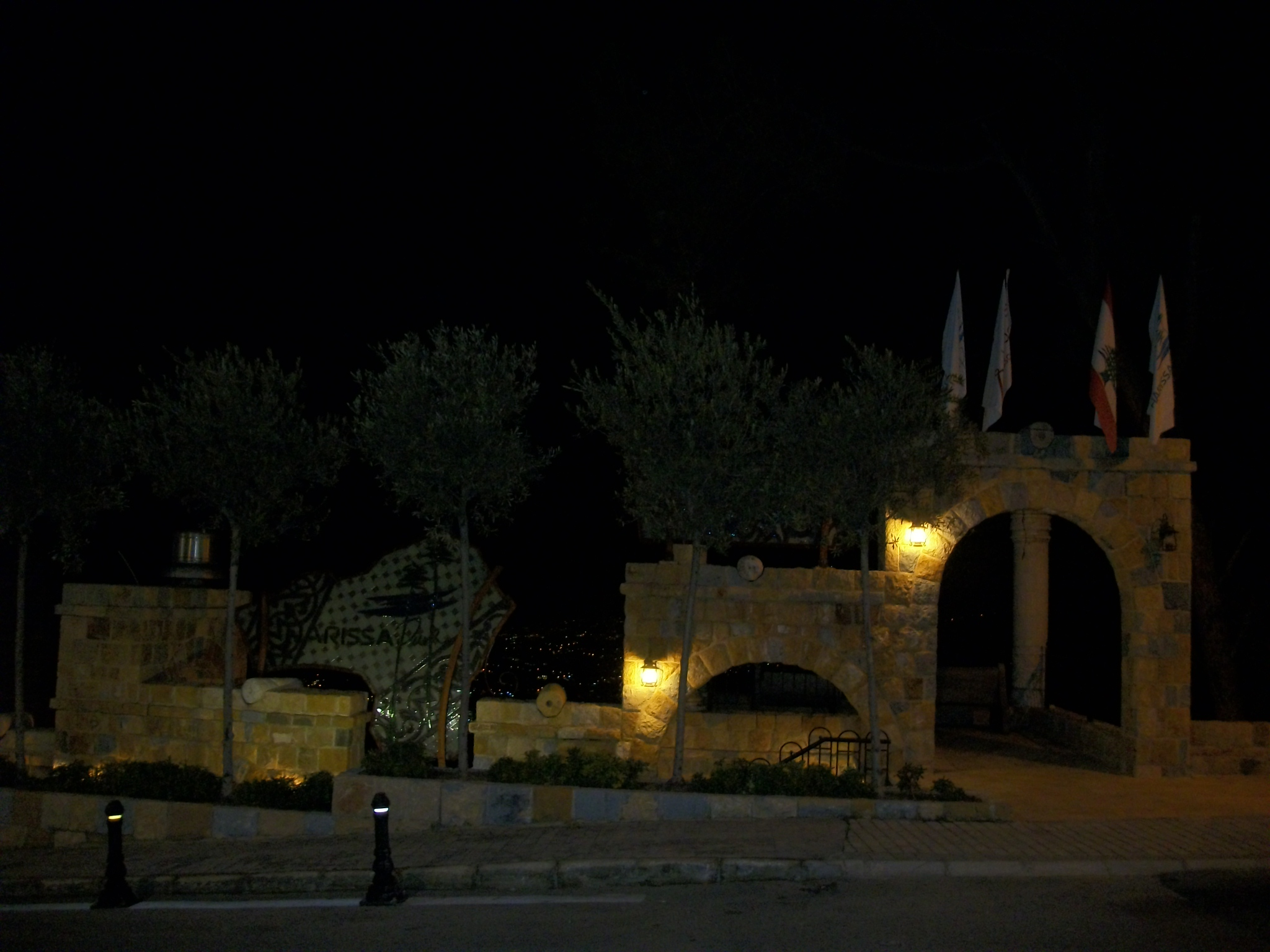

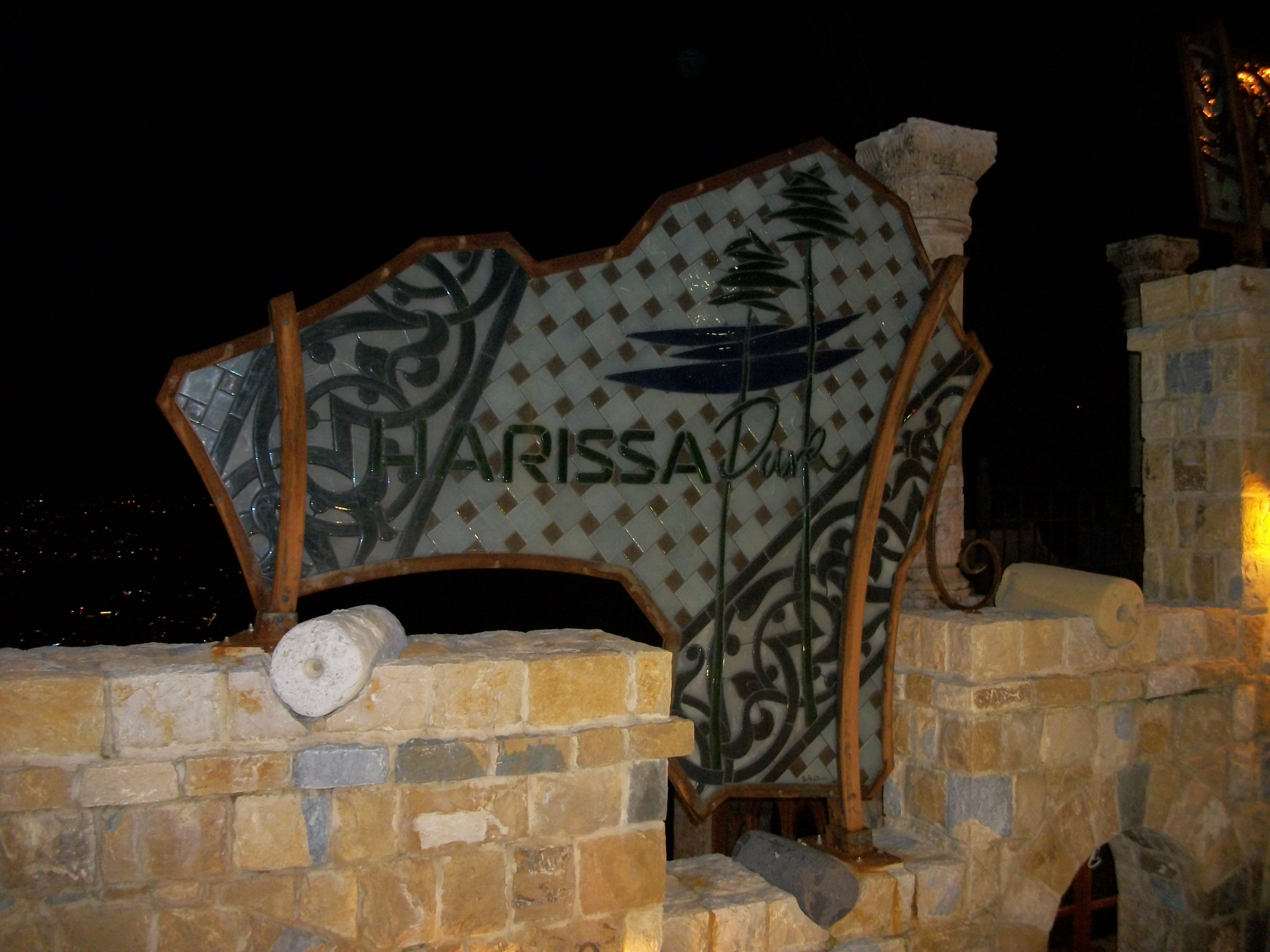

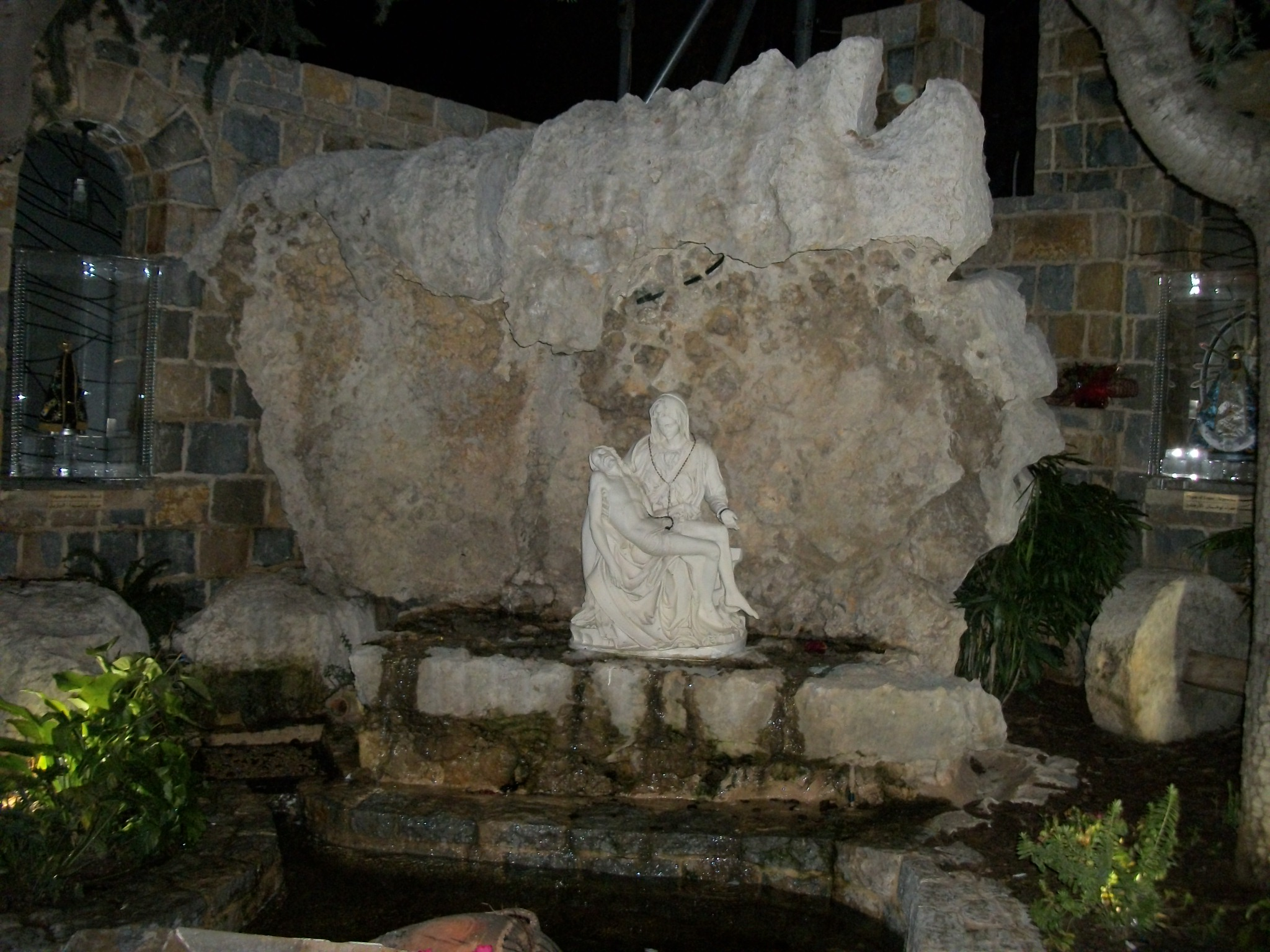

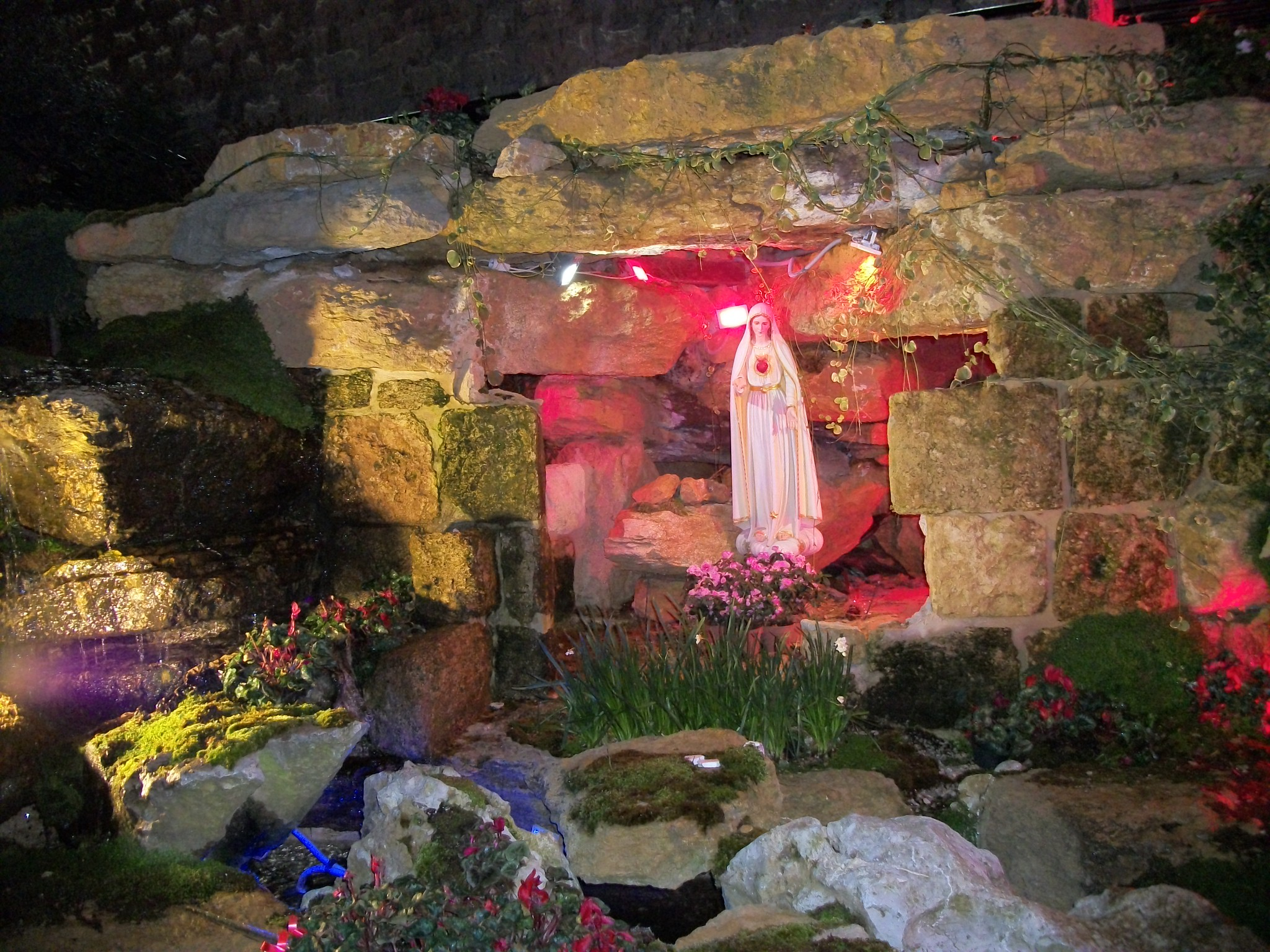

== Churches, schools, and shrines dedicated to Our Lady of Lebanon ==
=== Argentina ===
- Instituto Nuestra Señora del Libano, San Martin, Mendoza, Argentina
- Parroquia Nuestra Señora del Libano, Buenos Aires, Argentina

=== Australia ===
- Our Lady Of Lebanon Maronite Catholic Church, Melbourne VIC
- Our Lady Of Lebanon Maronite Catholic Church, Harris Park, Sydney, NSW
- Our Lady of Lebanon College, Harris Park, Sydney, NSW
- Our Lady of Lebanon Maronite Catholic Church, West Wollongong NSW

=== Brazil ===
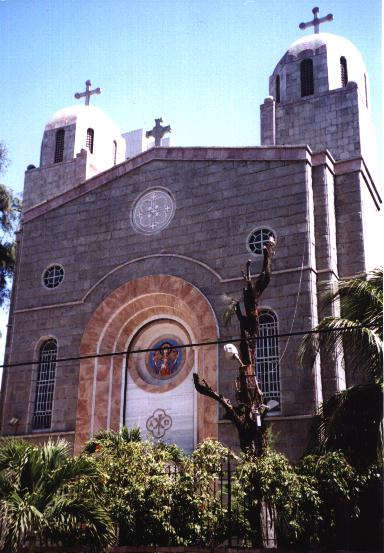
Melkite Church of Our Lady of Lebanon in Fortaleza, Brazil

- Our Lady of Lebanon Melkite Church, Fortaleza
- Our Lady of Lebanon Square, Visconde do Rio Branco, Minas Gerais
- Our Lady Of Lebanon Maronite Catholic Church, Belo Horizonte, MG
- Our Lady of Lebanon Cathedral, São Paulo, SP
- Our Lady of Lebanon Parish, Porto Alegre, RS
- Our Lady of Lebanon Church, Rio de Janeiro, RJ

=== Canada ===
- Our Lady Of Lebanon Maronite Catholic Church, Halifax, Nova Scotia
- Our Lady Of Lebanon Maronite Catholic Church, Toronto, Ontario
- Our Lady Of Lebanon Maronite Catholic Church and Shrine, Leamington, Ontario
- Our Lady Of Lebanon Maronite Catholic Church, Laval, Quebec

=== Colombia ===
- *Our Lady of Lebanon Procathedral, Bogotá, (Nuestra Señora del Líbano) a.k.a. Church of Santa Clara de Assís

=== France ===
- Notre Dame du Liban, Paris, France, seat of the Maronite Catholic Eparchy of Our Lady of Lebanon of Paris

=== Mexico ===
- Our Lady of Valvanera Cathedral, Mexico City, seat of the Maronite Catholic Eparchy of Our Lady of the Martyrs of Lebanon in Mexico

=== South Africa ===
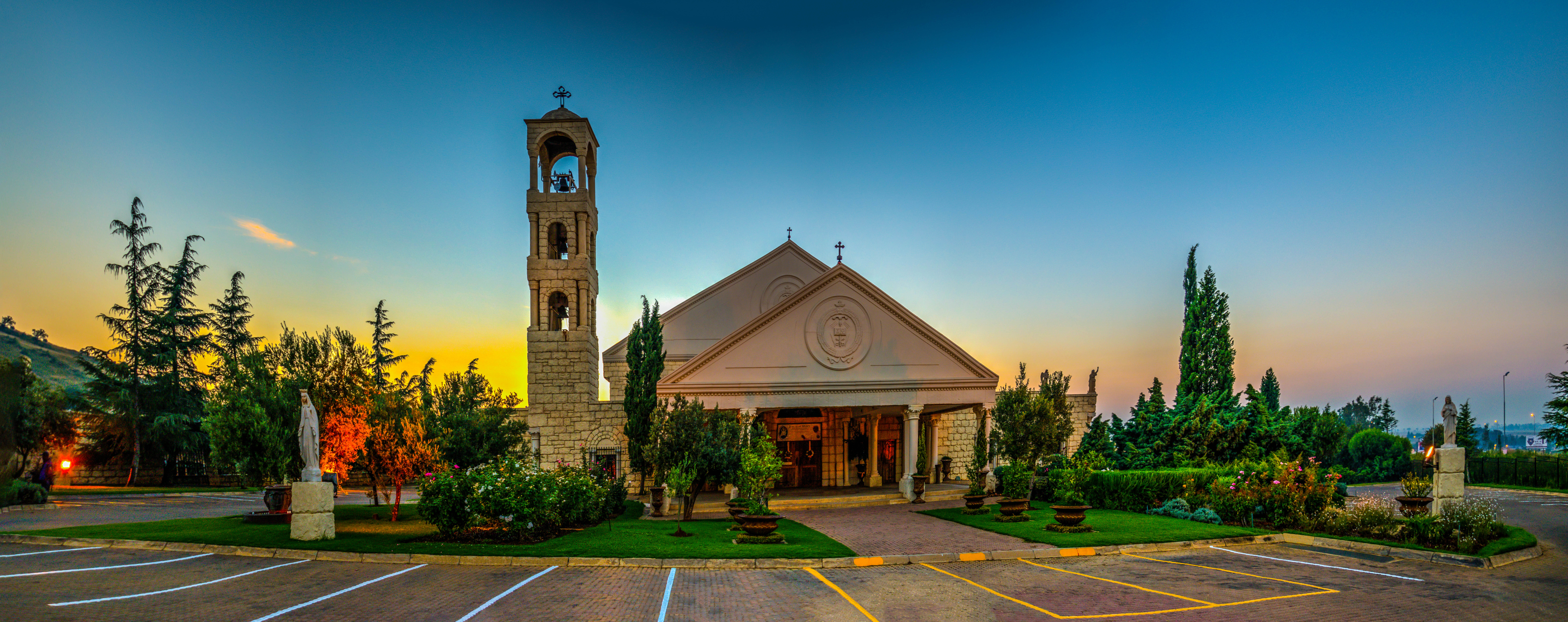
Our Lady Of Lebanon Church in Mulbarton, Johannesburg

- Shrine of Our Lady of the Cedars of Lebanon, Woodmead, Johannesburg
- The Maronite Catholic Church, Mulbarton, Johannesburg

=== United Kingdom ===
- Our Lady of Lebanon Parish – London

=== United States ===
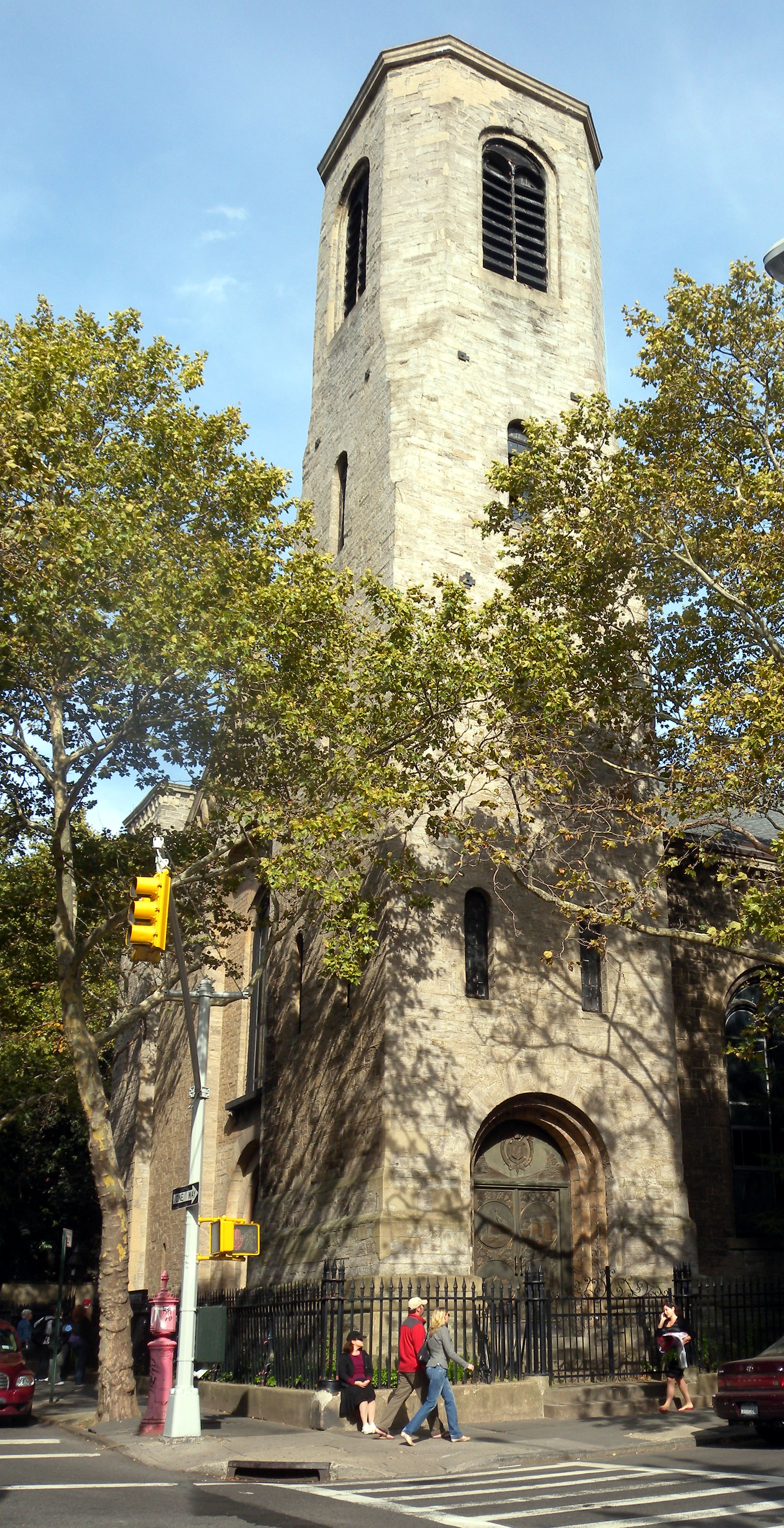
Brooklyn cathedral

==== California ====
- Mariam Mother of Life Shrine (replica of Our Lady of Lebanon) at St. Ephrem's Maronite Catholic Church – El Cajon, California
- Maronite Eparchy of Our Lady of Lebanon – Los Angeles, California
- Our Lady of Mount Lebanon – Los Angeles, California
- Our Lady of Lebanon Maronite Antiochene Catholic Church – Millbrae, California

==== Connecticut ====
- Our Lady of Lebanon Maronite Catholic Church, Waterbury, Connecticut

==== District of Columbia ====
- Our Lady of Lebanon Chapel, Basilica of the National Shrine of the Immaculate Conception, Washington, D.C.
- Our Lady of Lebanon Parish, Washington, D.C.
- Our Lady of Lebanon Seminary, Washington, D.C.

==== Florida ====
- Our Lady of Lebanon Maronite Catholic Church, Miami, Florida

==== Illinois ====
- Our Lady of Lebanon Maronite Catholic Church, Lombard, Illinois

==== Massachusetts ====
- Our Lady of the Cedars of Lebanon, Boston, Massachusetts

==== Michigan ====
- Our Lady of Lebanon Maronite Catholic Church, Flint, Michigan

==== Missouri ====
- Catholic Eparchy of Our Lady of Lebanon, Saint Louis, Missouri

==== New York ====
- Our Lady of Lebanon Maronite Cathedral (Brooklyn)
- Our Lady of Lebanon Parish (1914 Maronite; 1934 Roman), Niagara Falls, New York

==== Ohio ====
- Our Lady of Lebanon Maronite Mission, Columbus, Ohio
- Basilica and National Shrine of Our Lady of Lebanon (North Jackson, Ohio)

==== Oklahoma ====
- Our Lady of Lebanon Catholic Church, Norman, Oklahoma

==== Pennsylvania ====
- Our Lady of Lebanon Maronite Catholic Church, Easton, Pennsylvania

==== Texas ====
- Our Lady of Lebanon Maronite Catholic Church, Austin, Texas
- Our Lady of the Cedars Maronite Catholic Church, Houston, Texas
- Our Lady of Lebanon Maronite Catholic Church, Lewisville, Texas

==== West Virginia ====
- Our Lady of Lebanon Maronite Catholic Church, Wheeling, West Virginia

=== Uruguay ===
- Our Lady of Lebanon Parish Church, Montevideo

== See also ==
- Our Lady of Lebanon Cathedral (disambiguation)
