= Valvanera =

Valvanera or Valbanera may refer to:

- Our Lady of Valvanera, a Marian apparition from La Rioja, Spain
  - Monastery of Nuestra Señora de Valvanera, a Catholic monastery in Anguiano, La Rioja, Spain
  - Valvanera Cathedral, Mexico City, a Maronite cathedral in Mexico City
  - Santuario de Nuestra Señora de Valvanera (Sonsón), church in Colombia
  - Santuario de Nuestra Señora de Valvanera (Pitalito), church in Colombia
- Viscounty of Valvanera, a noble title in Spain
- Valvanera (tributary of the Najerilla), a river in northern Spain
- Valvanera (tributary of the Tormes), a river in northern Spain
- SS Valbanera, a Spanish ship sunk in 1919

== See also ==
- Balvanera
