= Chebel =

Chebel is a surname. Notable people with the surname include:

- Fadi Abou Chebel (born 1969), Maronite Exarch (Maronite Catholic Apostolic Exarchate of Colombia)
- Malek Chebel (1953–2016), Algerian philosopher and anthropologist of religions

== See also ==
- Ouled Chebel, a town and commune in Algiers Province, Algeria
