= Maronite Catholic Apostolic Exarchate of Colombia =

Maronite Catholic jurisdiction in Colombia

Apostolic Exarchate of Colombia (Maronite) Exarchatus Apostolicus Columbiae

Location
- Country: Colombia
- Metropolitan: Immediately exempt to the Holy See
- Headquarters: Lebanon

Information
- Denomination: Catholic Church
- Sui iuris church: Maronite Church
- Rite: West Syro-Antiochene Rite
- Established: 20 January 2016
- Cathedral: Our Lady of Lebanon Procathedral, Bogotá

Current leadership
- Pope: Leo XIV
- Patriarch: Bechara Boutros al-Rahi
- Apostolic Exarch: Fadi Abou Chebel

Website
- https://exarcadomaronitacolombia.org/

Apostolic Exarchate of Colombia (in Latin: Exarchatus Apostolicus Columbiae) is the Apostolic Exarchate (Eastern Catholic missionary jurisdiction) of the Maronite Church for all Colombia, in South America.

Its exarchial episcopal see is the pro-Cathedral of Parroquia de Nuestra Señora del Líbano dedicated to Our Lady of Lebanon, in Colombian capital Bogotá, Distrito Capital de Bogotá. It is immediately exempt to the Holy See and the Dicastery for the Eastern Churches. The exarchate's current ordinary is Apostolic Exarch Fadi Abou Chebel.

== History ==
The Maronite Apostolic Exarchate was erected by Pope Francis on 20 January 2016, Its first Apostolic Exarch, without episcopal character, is Fadi Abou Chebel, OMM, also appointed apostolic visitor of the Maronite faithful living in Peru and Ecuador.

== Ordinaries ==
Apostolic Exarchs

- Fadi Abou Chebel, Mariamite Maronite Order (O.M.M.) (20 January 2016 - ...)

== Sources and external links ==
- Catholic Hierarchy
- GCatholic
