= Caparrones =

Caparrón stew

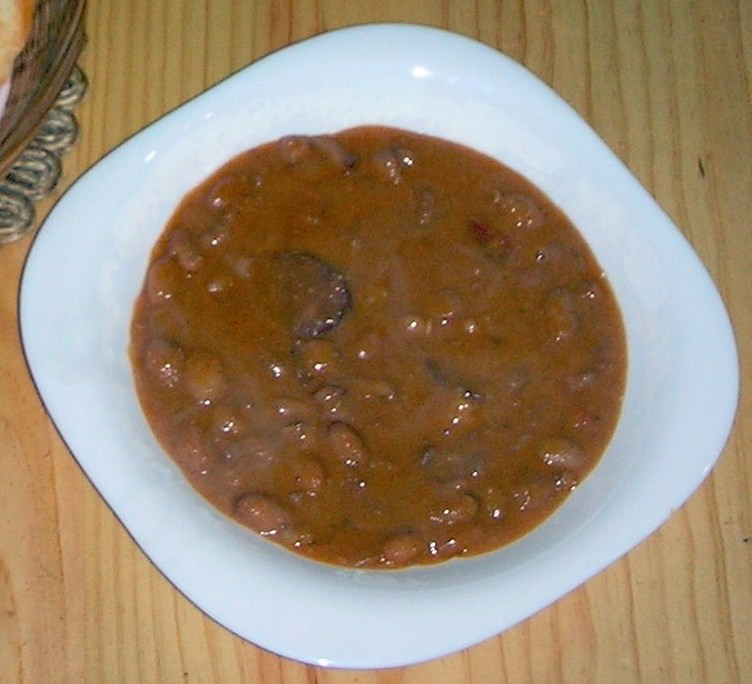
- A plate of caparrones stewed with chorizo
- Type: Stew
- Place of origin: Spain
- Region or state: La Rioja
- Main ingredients: Caparrón (red kidney beans), chorizo

Caparrones is a Spanish stew made of caparrón, a variety of red kidney bean, and a spicy sausage chorizo, both of which are local specialties of the Spanish La Rioja region. The shape of caparrón bean is shorter and rounder than common red kidney beans. The stew is regarded as one of the most important dishes in Riojan cooking.

Its cultural importance in the region can be compared to Asturian fabada. Caparrones are associated with strength, as well as with flatulence. There are some restaurants and inns in La Rioja that take this name (Mesón los Caparrones, etc.).

This plant is widely cultivated in groves around La Rioja, and the most famous are from Anguiano where a yearly festival is held honoring these beans.

Rods obtained from branches of trees like poplar or bushes like elder and used for guiding the plant's growth are called palos de caparrón (caparrón staves). These staves are saved from one year to another tied in bunches called gavillas. There are also some varieties of caparrones called sin palo (without a stave) because they do not grow very tall and so do not require artificial support.

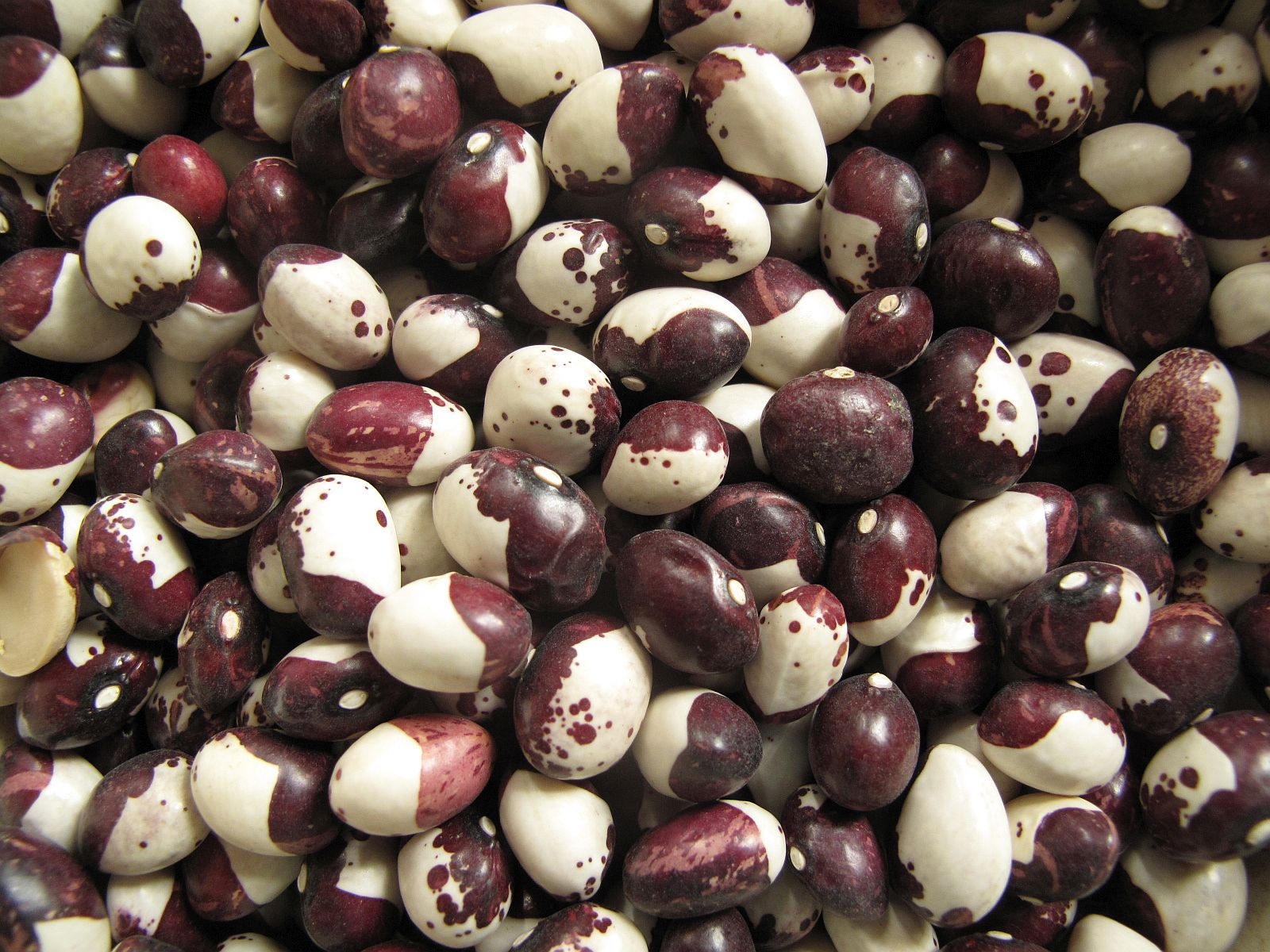
Alubia del obispo or caparrón beans.

== See also ==
- Fabada Asturiana
- List of Spanish dishes
