= Georges Saad Abi Younes =

Maronite Lebanese eparch in Mexico

Georges Saad Abi Younes OLM
- Eparch Emeritus of Our Lady of the Martyrs of Lebanon
- Native name: جورج سعد ابى يونس
- Church: Maronite Church
- Diocese: Eparchy of Our Lady of the Martyrs of Lebanon in Mexico
- In office: 22 February 2003 – 10 July 2024
- Predecessor: Pierre Wadih Tayah
- Successor: Vacant

Orders
- Ordination: 3 July 1977
- Consecration: 26 April 2003 by Nasrallah Boutros Sfeir

Personal details
- Born: 18 April 1948 (age 78) Hammana, Mount Lebanon Governorate, Lebanon

Georges M. Saad Abi Younes, OLM (born 18 April 1948 in Hammana, Lebanon) is a Lebanese-born Mexican Maronite Catholic hierarch who served as the eparch of the Maronite Catholic Eparchy of Our Lady of the Martyrs of Lebanon since 2003 until his retirement in 2024.

== Early life ==
Georges Abi Younes joined in 1967 to the Lebanese Maronite Order. On 17 January 1970, he professed his perpetual religious vows, and on 3 July 1977 received his ordination to the priesthood, became chaplain of his religious order. Younes studied from 1970 literature, philosophy and theology and graduated in 1977 with a diploma of bachelor's degree. Until 1984 he worked as a secretary at the Faculty of Fine Arts at the Holy Spirit University of Kaslik and at the same time as an active pastor.

=== In Canada ===
In 1981 he completed his postgraduate studies at the Université de Montreal and Laval University in Canada. From 1984 to 1988 Younes worked in the Eparchy of Saint Maron of Montreal in Canada and developed extensive pastoral and missionary projects.

=== In Mexico ===
In 1988 he took the post of Rector of the Lebanese mission in Mexico. On 26 July 1995 he was appointed Superior of the Lebanese mission in Mexico and on 22 February 1997 his predecessor Bishop Pierre Wadih Tayah named him vicar general for the Maronite Catholic Eparchy of Our Lady of the Martyrs of Lebanon in Mexico. On 22 February 2003, Younes was appointed by Pope John Paul II eparch of the Maronite Catholic Eparchy of Our Lady of the Martyrs of Lebanon. Maronite Patriarch of Antioch, Cardinal Nasrallah Boutros Sfeir ordained him bishop on 26 April 2003 and his co-consecrators were Bishop Roland Aboujaoudé, Auxiliary Bishop of Antioch and Joseph Mohsen Béchara, Archeparch of Antelias.
