= Anguiano =

- Municipality
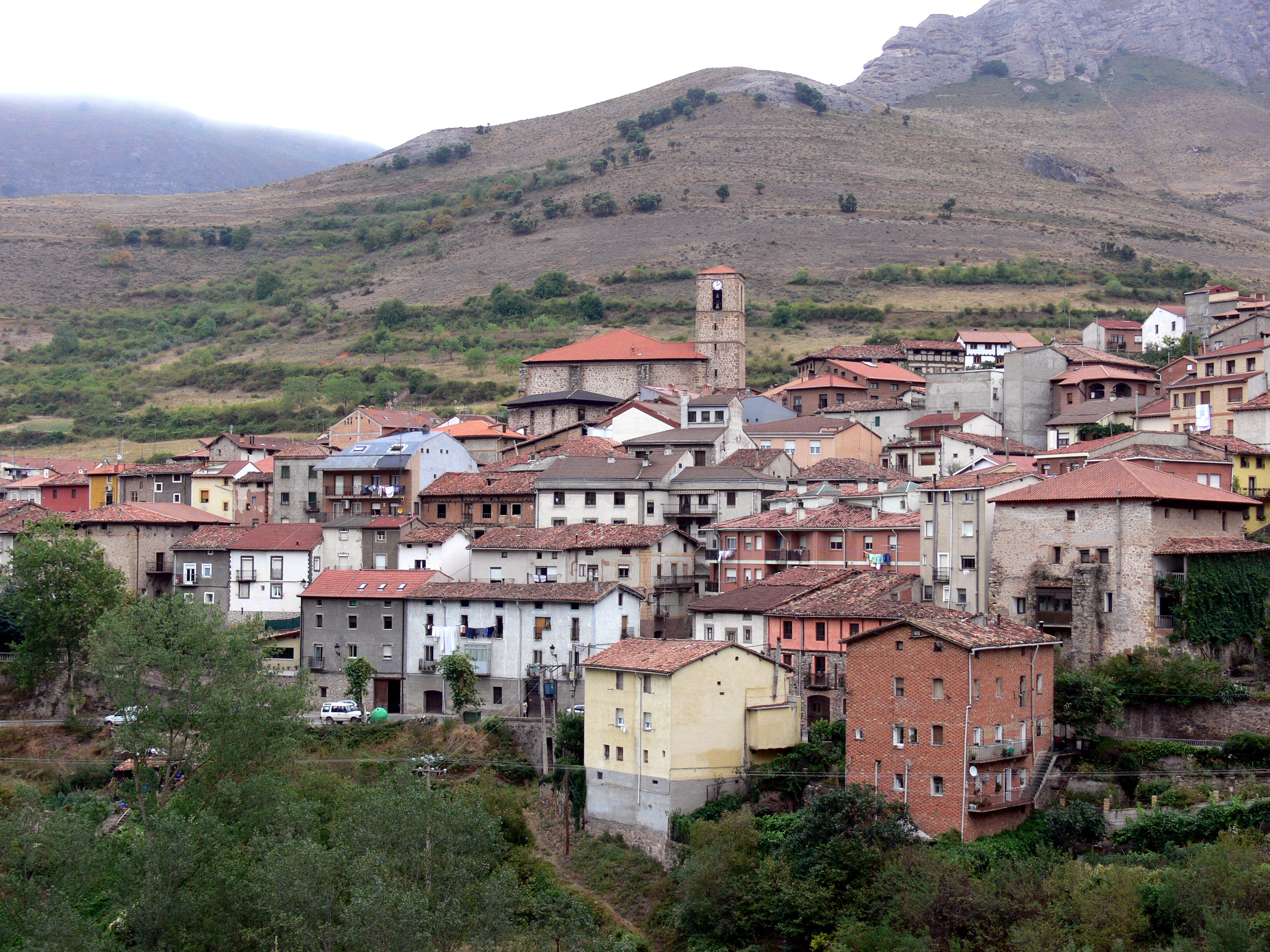
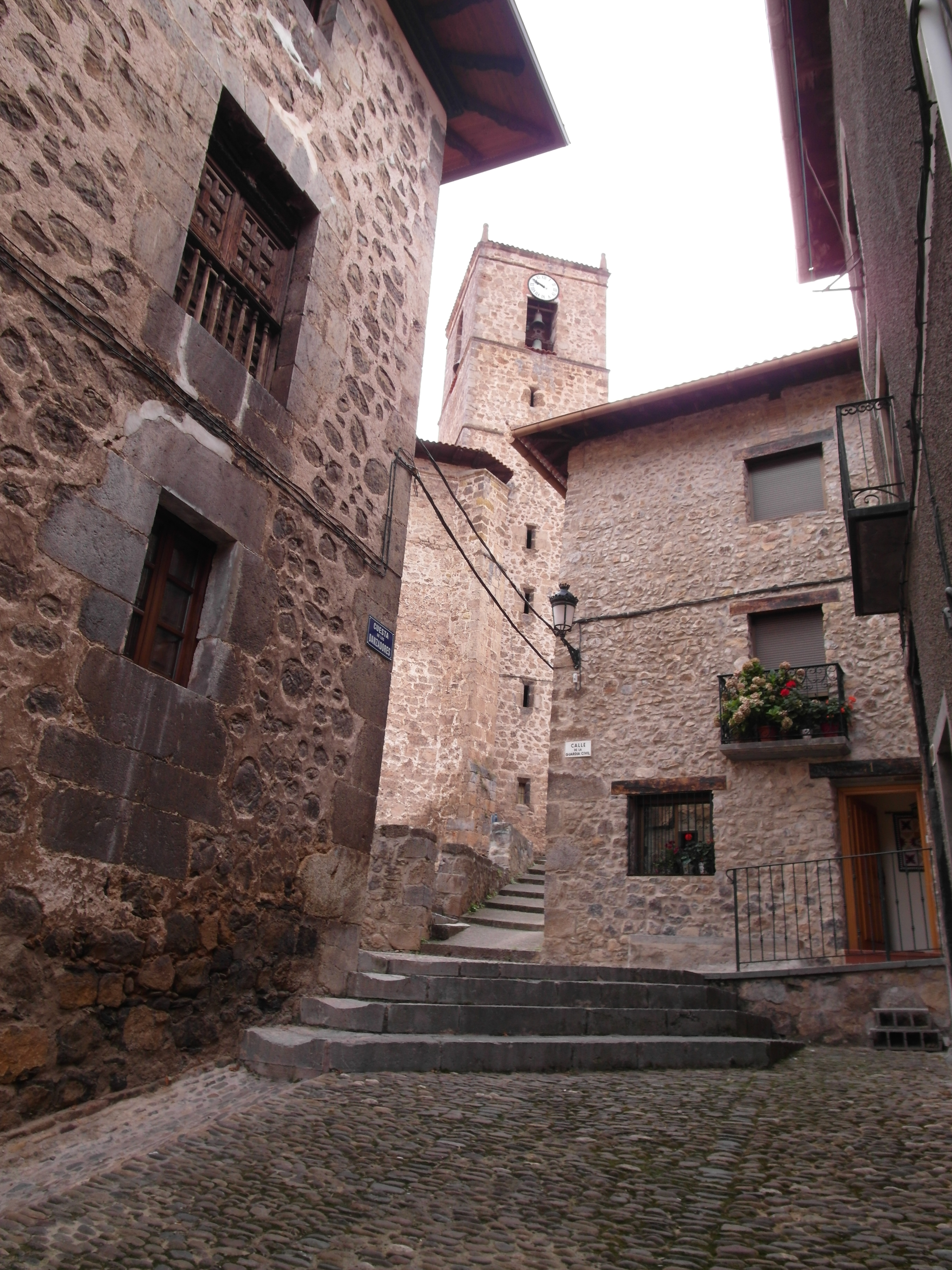
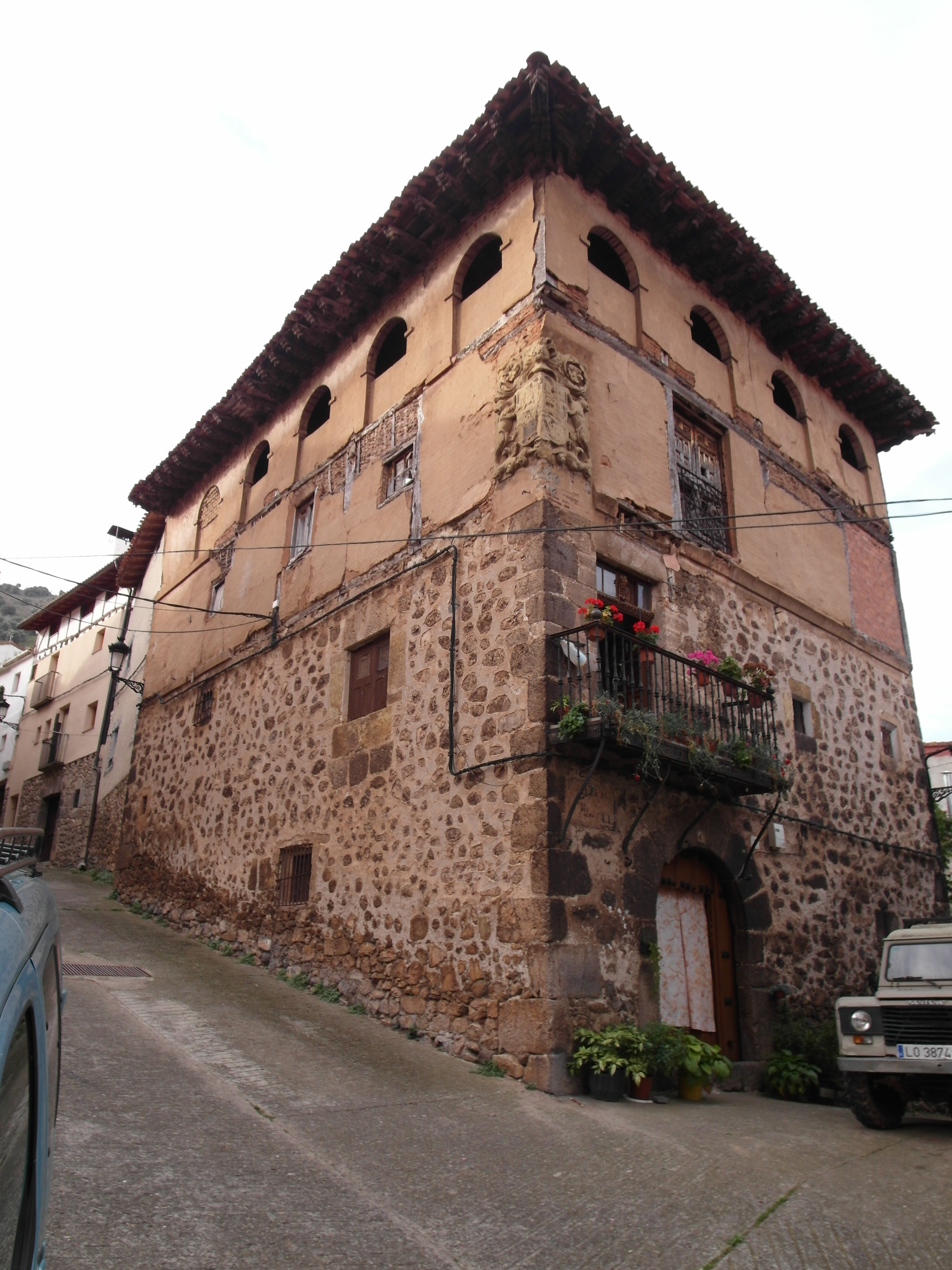
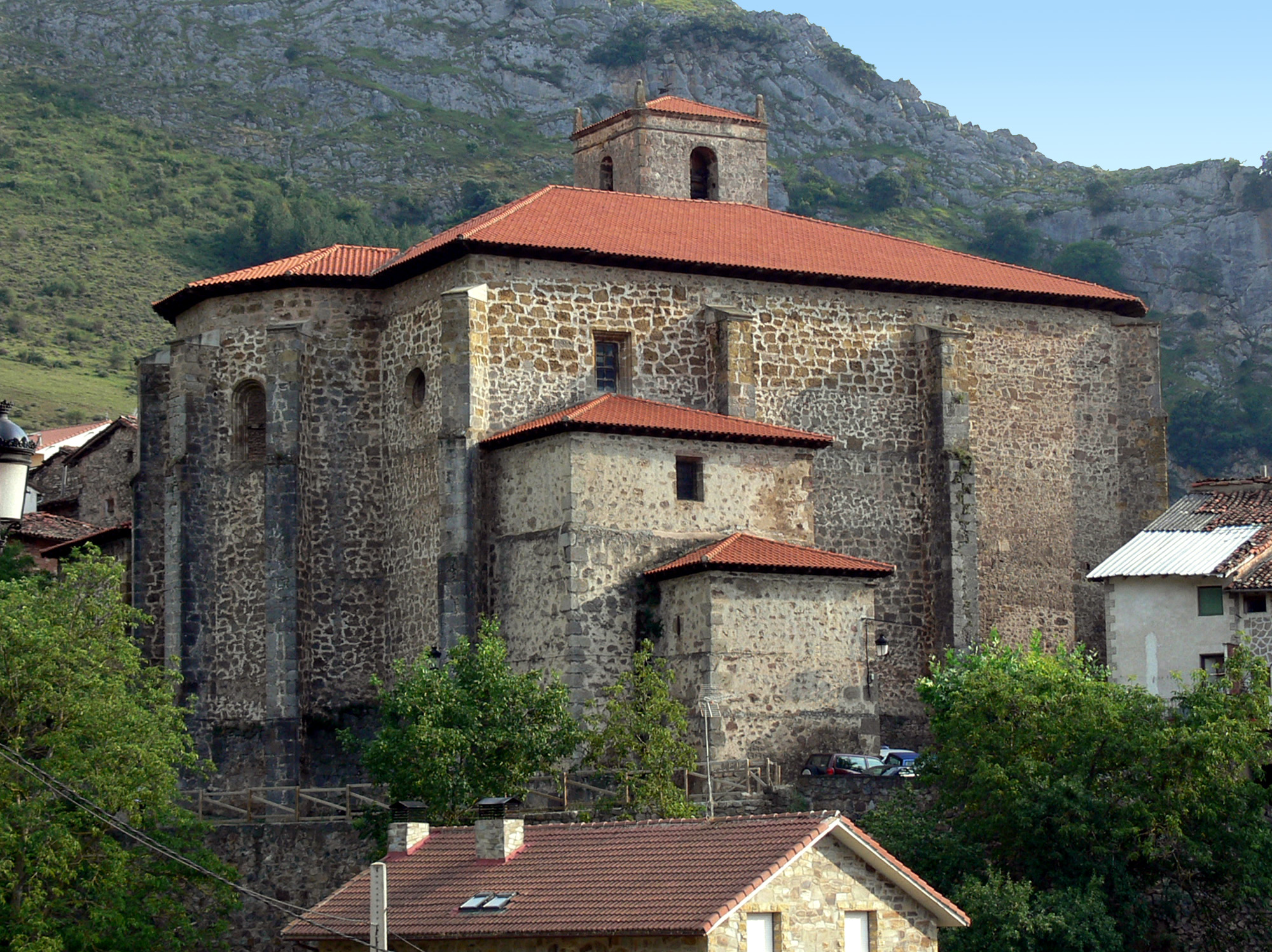
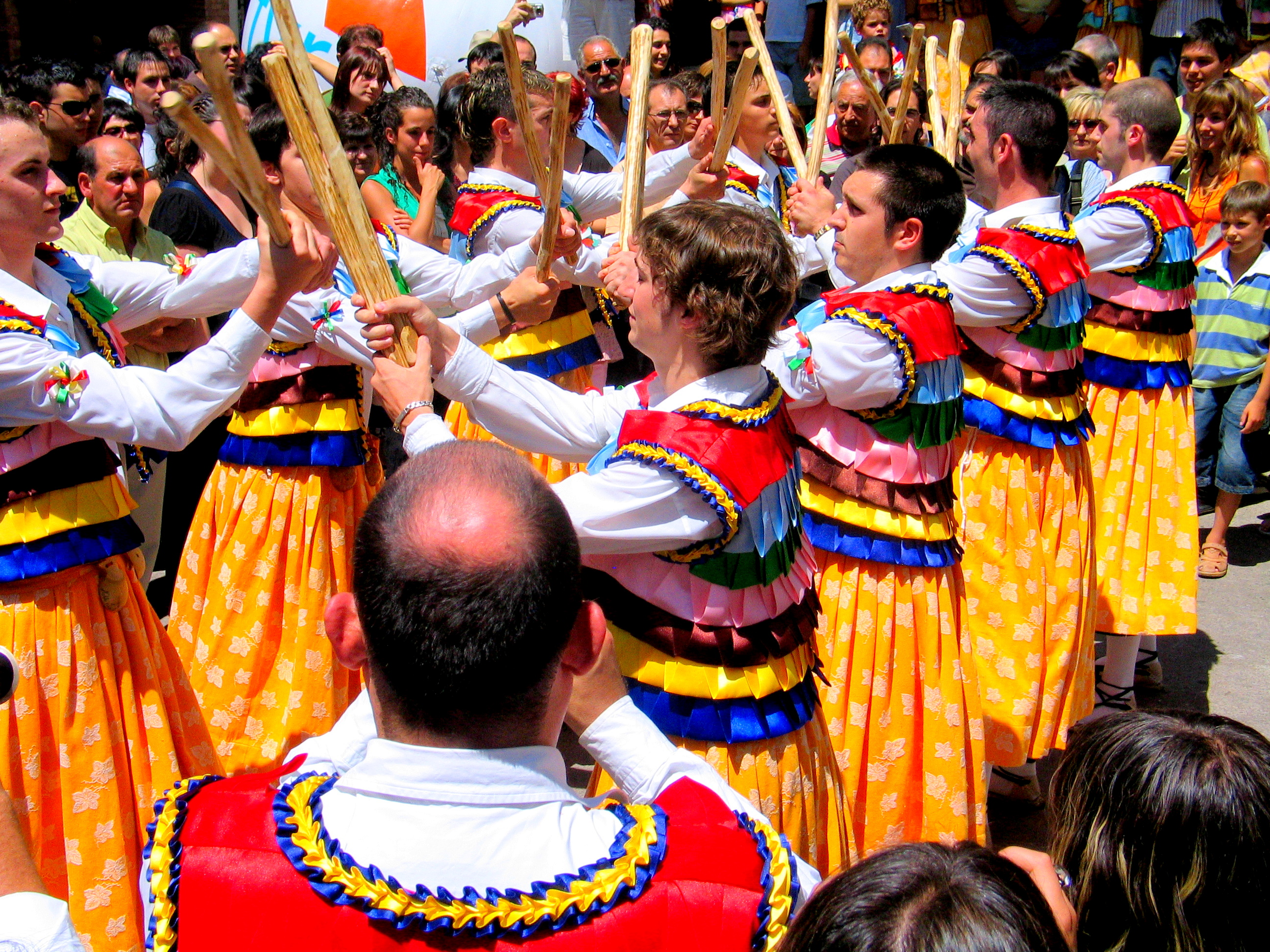
- Location of Anguiano in La Rioja

- Coat of arms

- Location within La Rioja. Anguiano (Spain)
- Coordinates: 42°15′40″N 2°45′50″W
- Country: Spain
- Autonomous community: La Rioja
- Comarca: Anguiano

Area
  - Total: 90.89 km^{2} (35.09 sq mi)
- Elevation: 663 m (2,175 ft)

Population (2025-01-01)
  - Total: 488
- Demonyms: Zarrio, Zarria
- Time zone: UTC+1 (CET)
  - Summer (DST): UTC+2 (CET)
- Website: Official website

Municipality of Anguiano

Anguiano (Spanish: Anguiano) is a small town in the province of La Rioja, Spain. It is located near Nájera and has a population of about 546 people (2006).

Anguiano is famous for its caparrones, red beans that are usually eaten in a stew with chorizo, and a yearly festival is held honoring these beans. The town is known as well for its traditional dance on stilts. While the dance has been historically danced only by boys and young men, in 2025 a young woman danced for the first time in more than four centuries of tradition.

== Places of interest ==
- Monastery of Nuestra Señora de Valvanera

== See also ==
- Caparrones
