= Shrine of Our Lady of the Cedars =

Eastern Catholic shrine in Johannesburg, South Africa

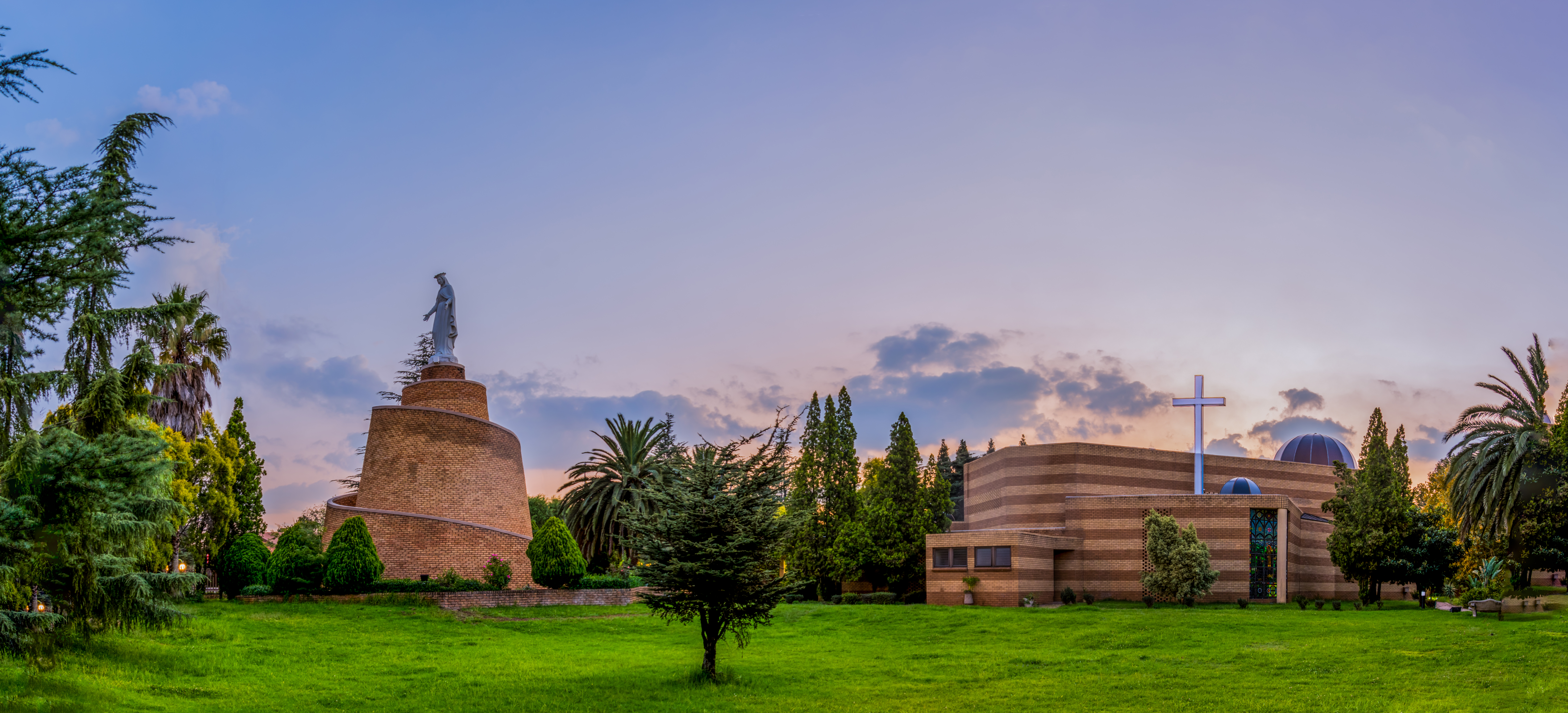
Our Lady of the Cedars shrine and church in Johannesburg

Shrine of Our Lady of the Cedars or Our Lady of Lebanon, is an Eastern Catholic shrine in Johannesburg, South Africa. The Shrine is on the grounds of the Our Lady of the Cedars Church, located in Woodmead. The Shrine, a monument to the Virgin Mary, is a replica of the original shrine in Lebanon.
