= Nuestra Señora del Líbano, Montevideo =

Church in Montevideo, Uruguay

Nuestra Señora del Líbano
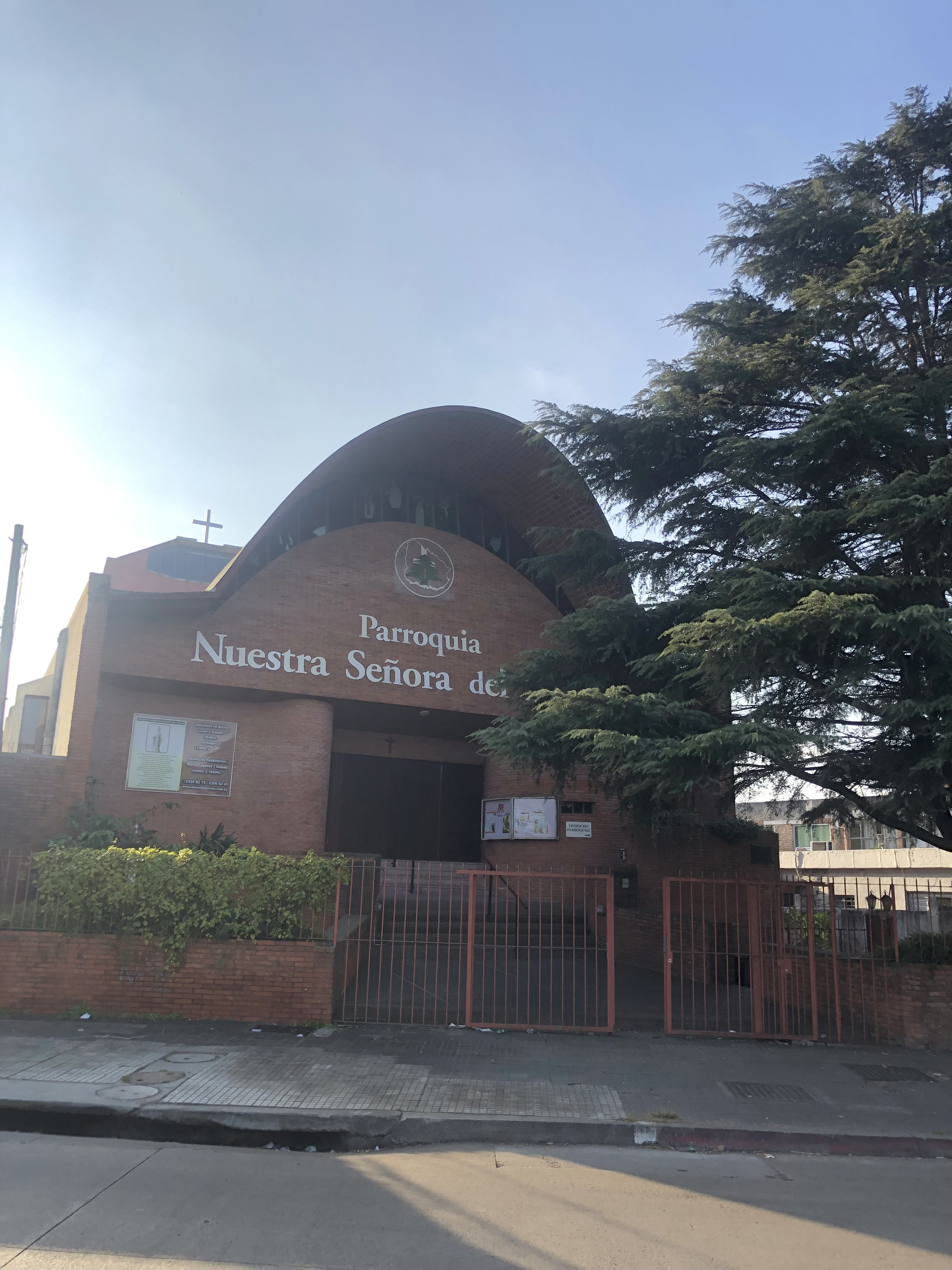

Religion
- Affiliation: Maronite Catholic
- Ecclesiastical or organisational status: Parish church
- Year consecrated: 1986

Location
- Location: Molinos de Raffo 926; Montevideo, Uruguay
- Interactive map of Nuestra Señora del Líbano

Architecture
- Architect: Eladio Dieste
- Type: Church

The Church of Our Lady of Lebanon (Spanish: Iglesia de Nuestra Señora del Líbano) is a Maronite (Eastern Catholic) parish church in the neighbourhood of Sayago, Montevideo, Uruguay.

Uruguay has a strong presence of Lebanese immigrants and their offspring. In 1888, some of them asked the Roman Catholic bishop Inocencio María Yéregui for permission to have their own sacraments celebrated by a Maronite priest. Since 1924, the Maronite Order of the Blessed Virgin Mary is also in Montevideo. Their own parish was established on 30 November 1941. The present temple was built in 1984–1986, designed by engineer Eladio Dieste; it is dedicated to Our Lady of Lebanon.
