= Fadi Abou Chebel =

Fadi Abou Chebel O.M.M.
- Apostolic Exarch of Colombia
- Church: Maronite Church
- See: Apostolic Exarchate of Colombia
- Appointed: 20 January 2016
- Predecessor: Exarchate erected

Orders
- Ordination: 23 December 1995

Personal details
- Born: 19 October 1969 (age 56) Deir al-Qamar, Mount Lebanon Governorate, Lebanon

Fadi Abou Chebel, OMM (born on 19 October 1969 in Deir al-Qamar, Lebanon) is the current Apostolic Exarch of the Maronite Catholic Apostolic Exarchate of Colombia.

== Life ==
Fadi Abou Chebel joined the OMM of the Blessed Virgin Mary and on 19 January 1994 made his religious vows. He received on 23 December 1995, the sacrament of ordination to the priesthood.

On January 20, 2016 Chebel was appointed by Pope Francis Apostolic Exarch of Colombia.
