= Monastery of Nuestra Señora de Valvanera =

- Monasterio de Nuestra Señora de Valvanera (Spanish)
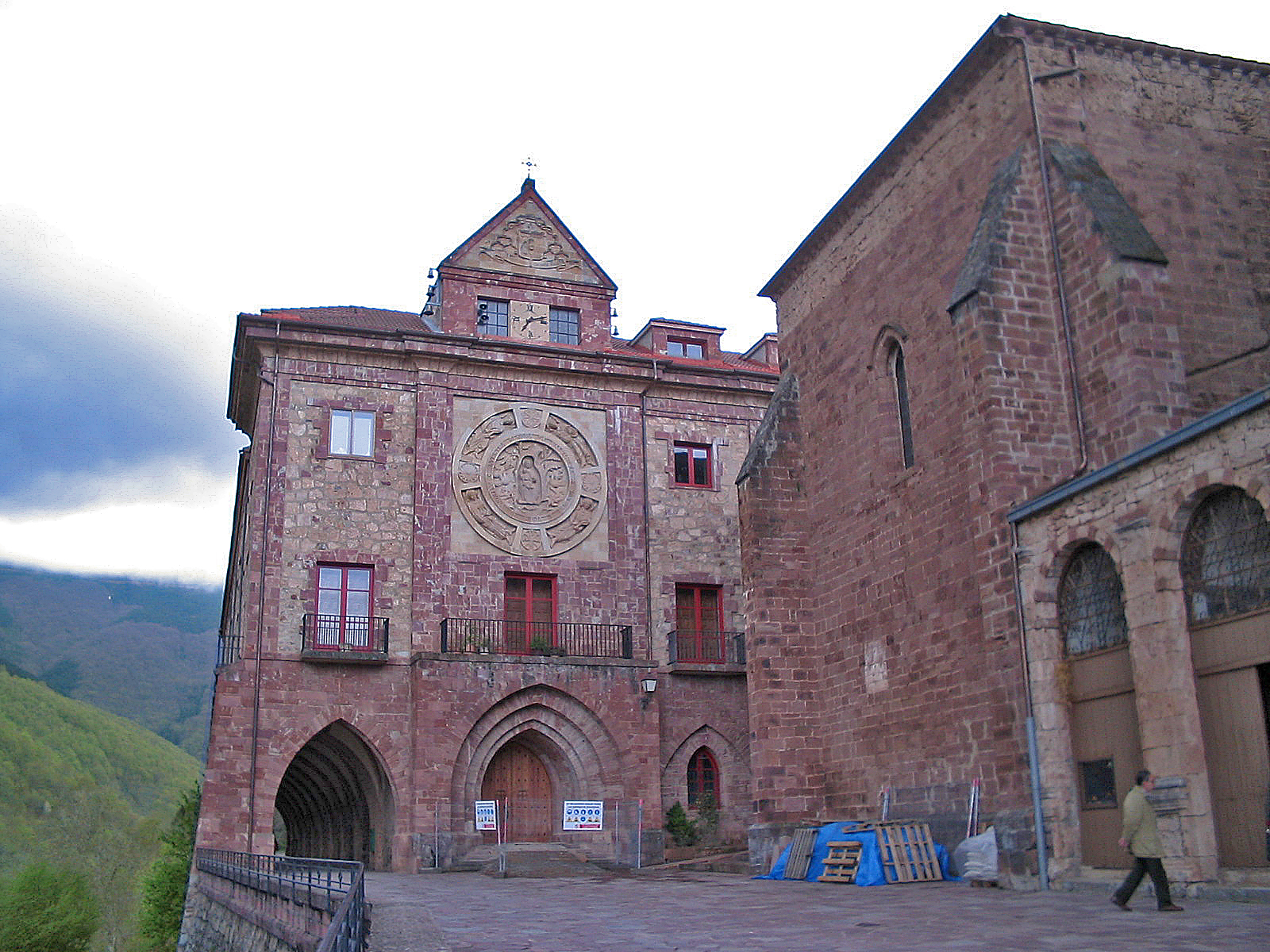

- Location within Spain
- 42.230793°N 2.870566°W
- Location: Anguiano, Spain

Spanish Cultural Heritage
- Official name: Monasterio de Nuestra Señora de Valvanera
- Type: Non-movable
- Criteria: Monument
- Designated: 2003
- Reference no.: RI-51-0010734

The Monastery of Nuestra Señora de Valvanera (Spanish: Monasterio de Nuestra Señora de Valvanera ) is a monastery located in Anguiano, Spain. It was declared Bien de Interés Cultural in 2003.

Nuestra Señora de Valvanera

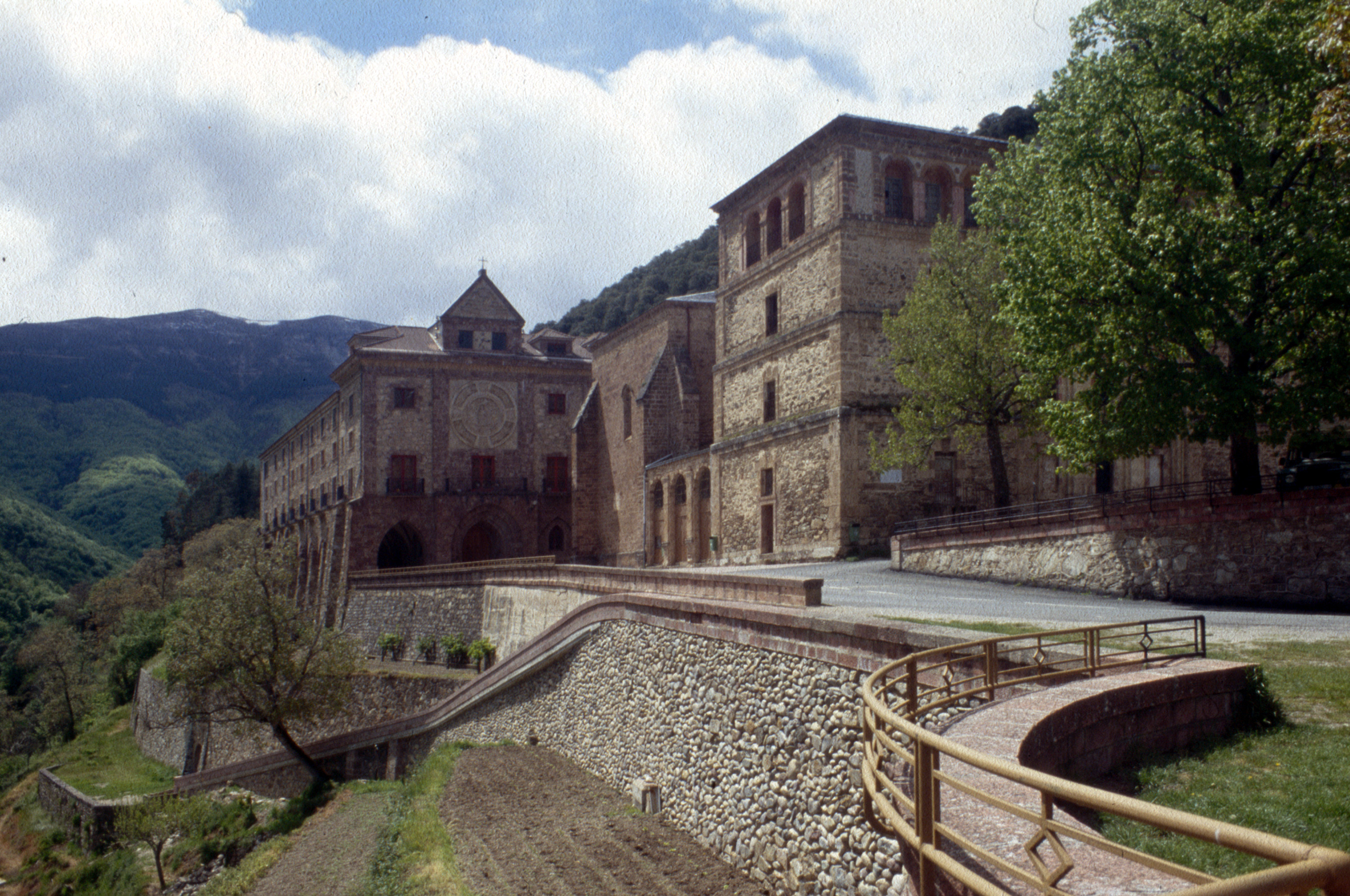

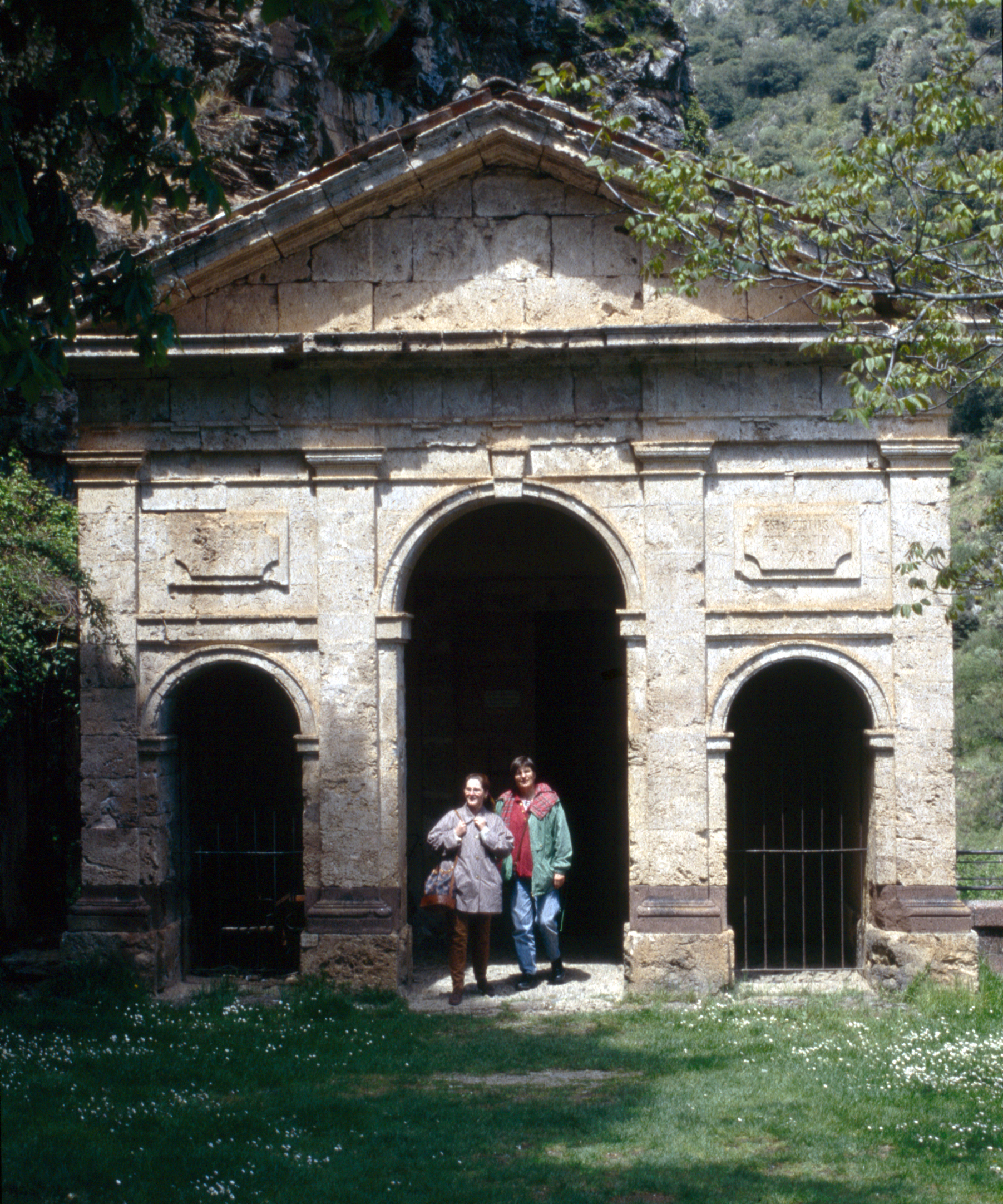

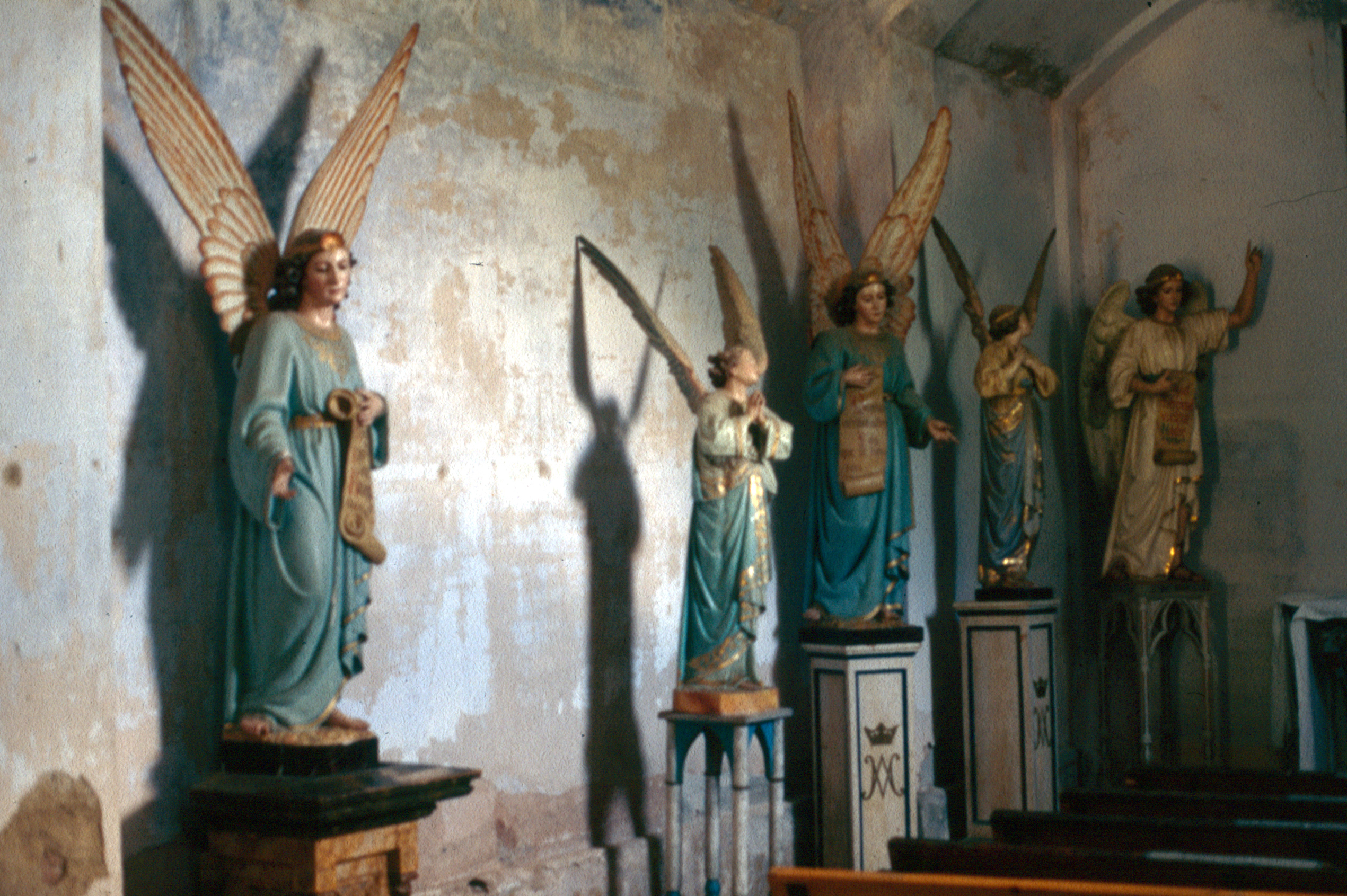

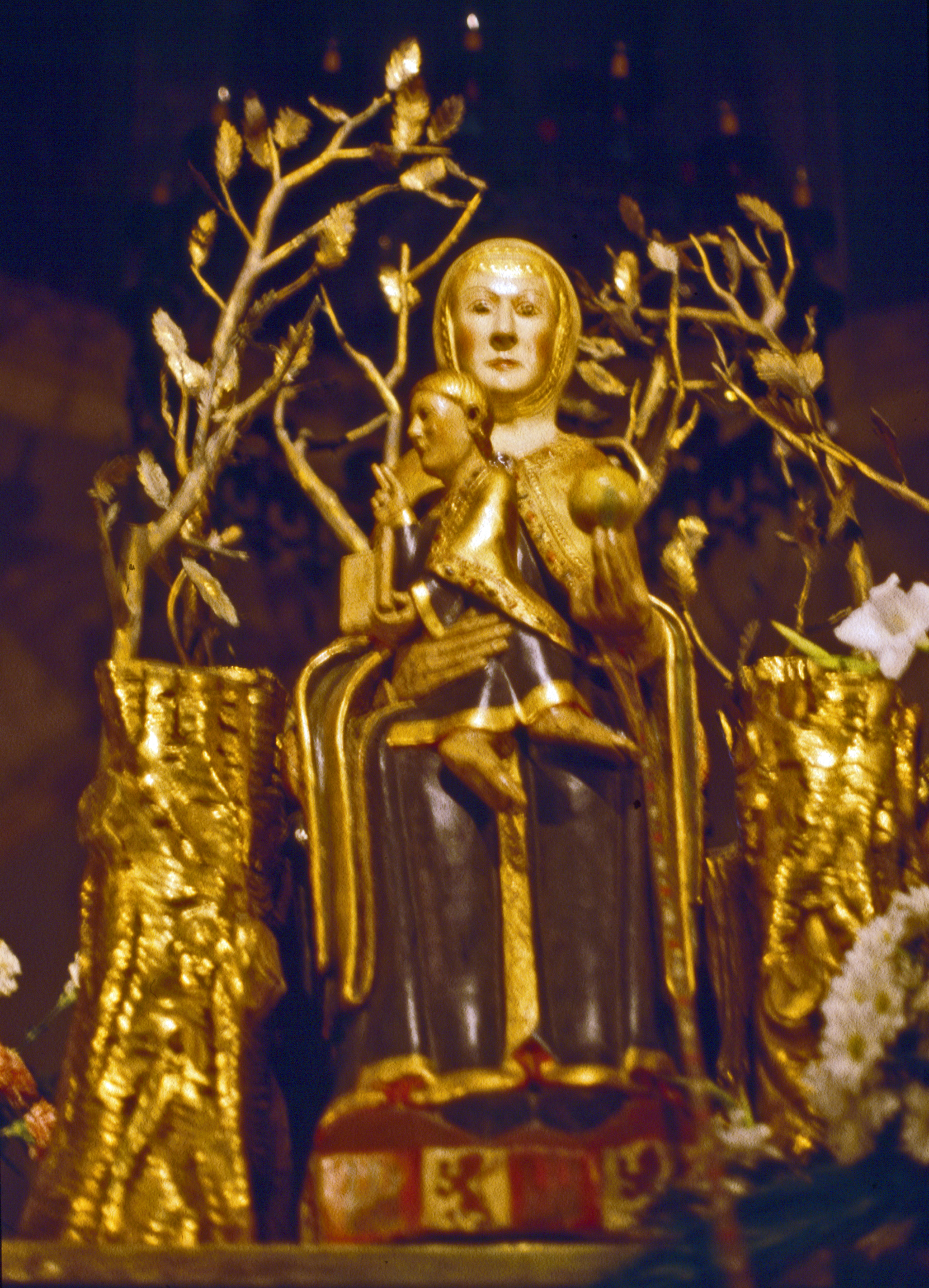
