= Valvanera Cathedral, Mexico City =

Coordinates: 19°25′45.87″N 99°7′49.56″W

- Valvanera Cathedral, Mexico City
- Country: Mexico
- Denomination: Roman Catholic

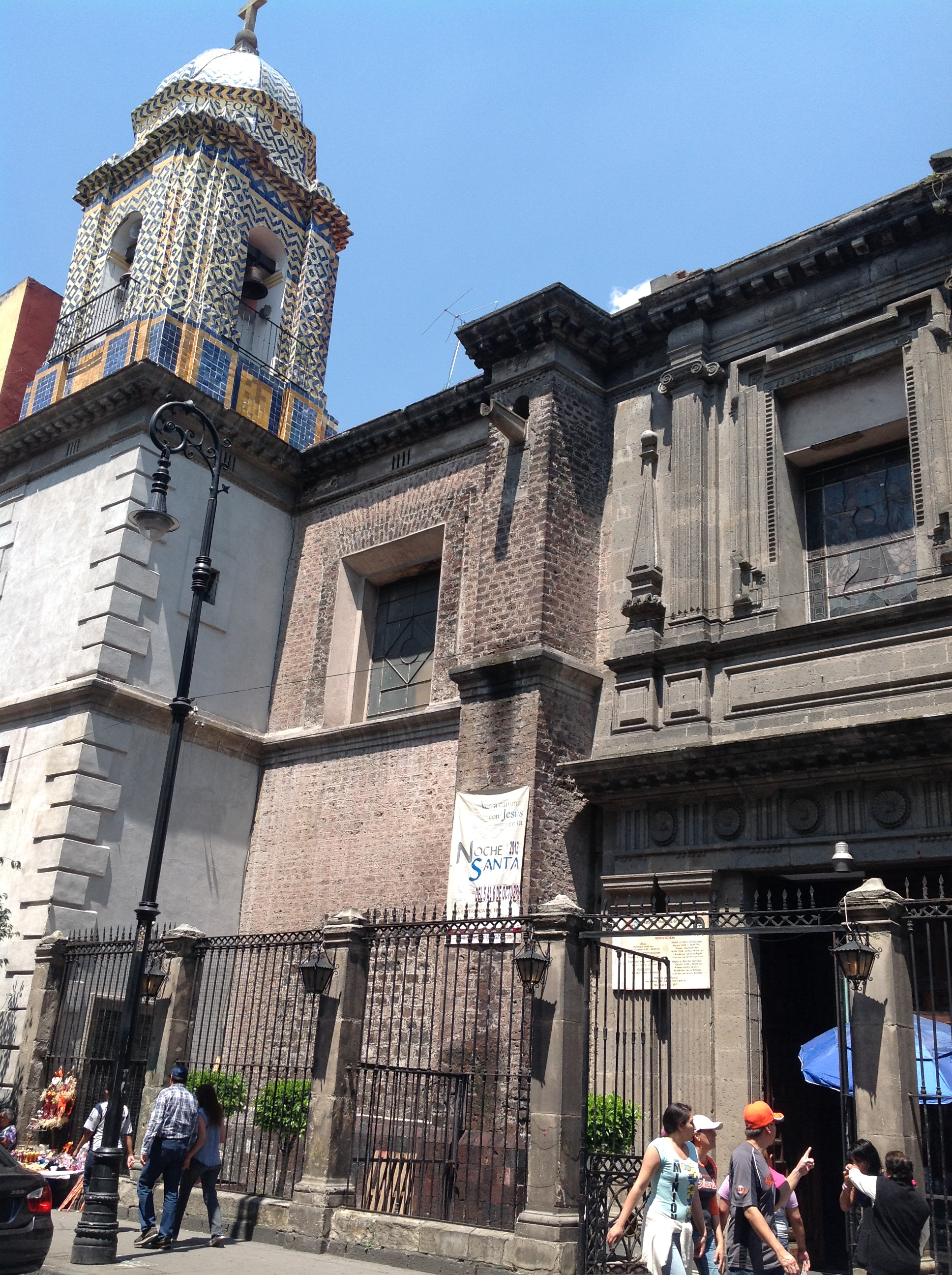
Facade of the church

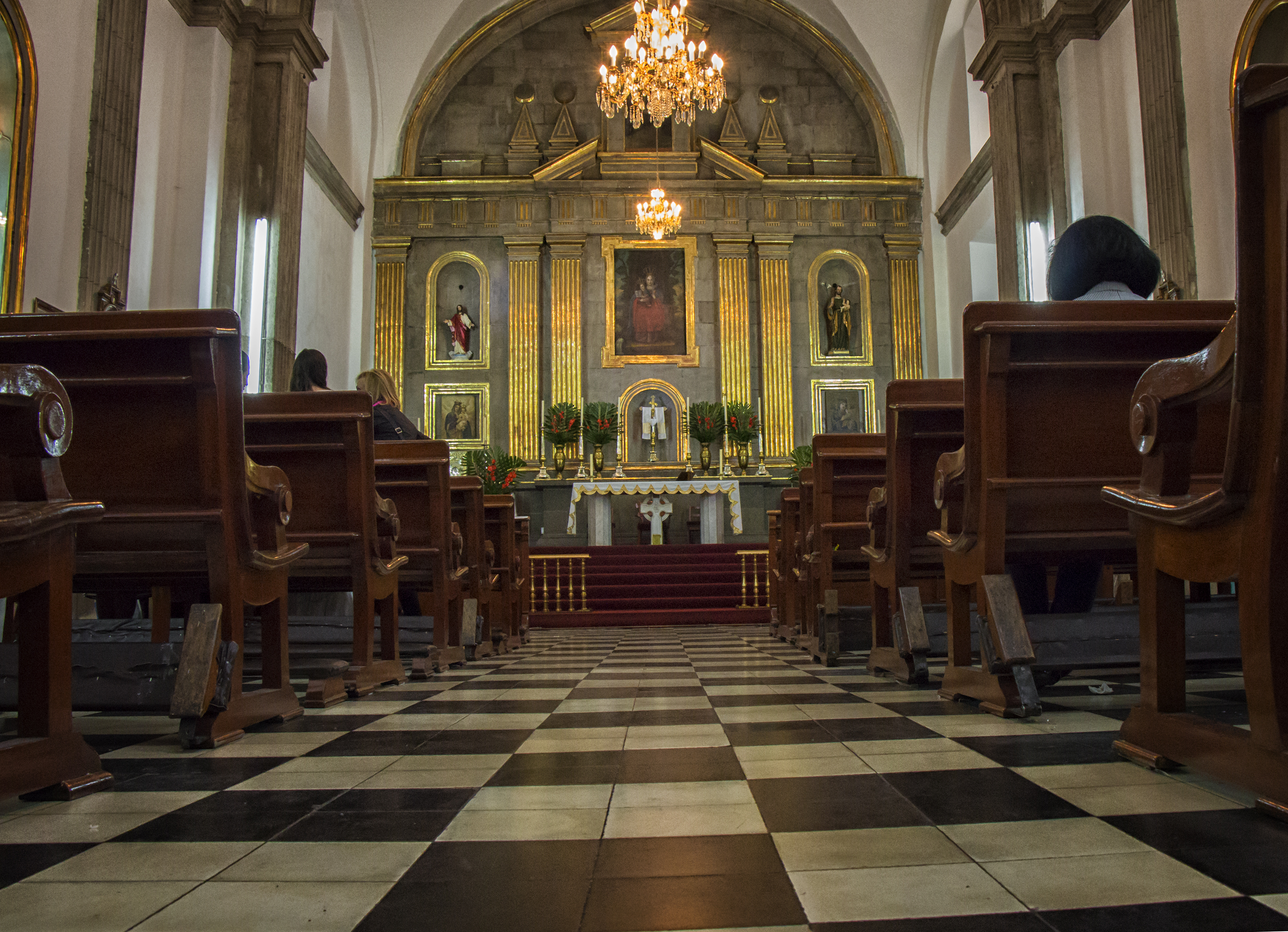
Main altar

The Cathedral of Our Lady of Valvanera (also Maronite Cathedral of Our Lady of Valvanera sometimes spelled Balvanera, Spanish: Catedral Maronita de Nuestra Señora de Valvanera) is located southeast of the main plaza, or Zocalo, of Mexico City on the corner of Correo Mayor and República de Uruguay in the historic center. The church originally belonged to the Convent of Santo Niño Perdido which was founded in 1573. This would then become a Conceptionist convent in the 17th century, when the church and convent were rebuilt in 1667. It also gained its current name at that time.

Due to the Reform Laws in 1861, the nuns were required to vacate the convent portion and the cloister and other buildings associated with the church were demolished. Its main altar was nearly destroyed during the political struggles of the 19th century but the oil of the Black Virgin of Valvanera (or Balvanera) remains.

This church was declared a historic monument on August 30, 1932.

Nowadays this church is the cathedral of the Maronite Catholic Eparchy of Our Lady of the Martyrs of Lebanon in Mexico.

The church is of Baroque style with its main entrance at the side of the church, as was common with convents in Mexico. The bell tower is covered in tile from Puebla. Only this church and the church of La Encarnación have Puebla tile on the bell towers. The church facade is of tezontle divided by five buttresses and topped by an entablature with a frieze with anagrams of the names of Jesus and Mary. Both portals have two levels of decoration on them. Inside, the main altar is Neoclassical and made of stone. The oil of Nuestra Señora de Balvanera is from the 17th century. It and the sculptures here were donated by a Maronite church. The sacristy has paintings by Carlos Clemente Lopez that date from 1750.

== See also ==
- List of colonial churches in Mexico City
