= Maronite Catholic Eparchy of Our Lady of the Martyrs of Lebanon in Mexico =

Eastern Catholic eparchy in Mexico

Coordinates: 19.4194°N 99.1456°W

Eparchy of Our Lady of the Martyrs of Lebanon Eparchy Dominae Nostrae Martyrum Libanensium in Civitate Mexicana Maronitarum Eparquía de Nuestra Señora de los Mártires del Líbano en México
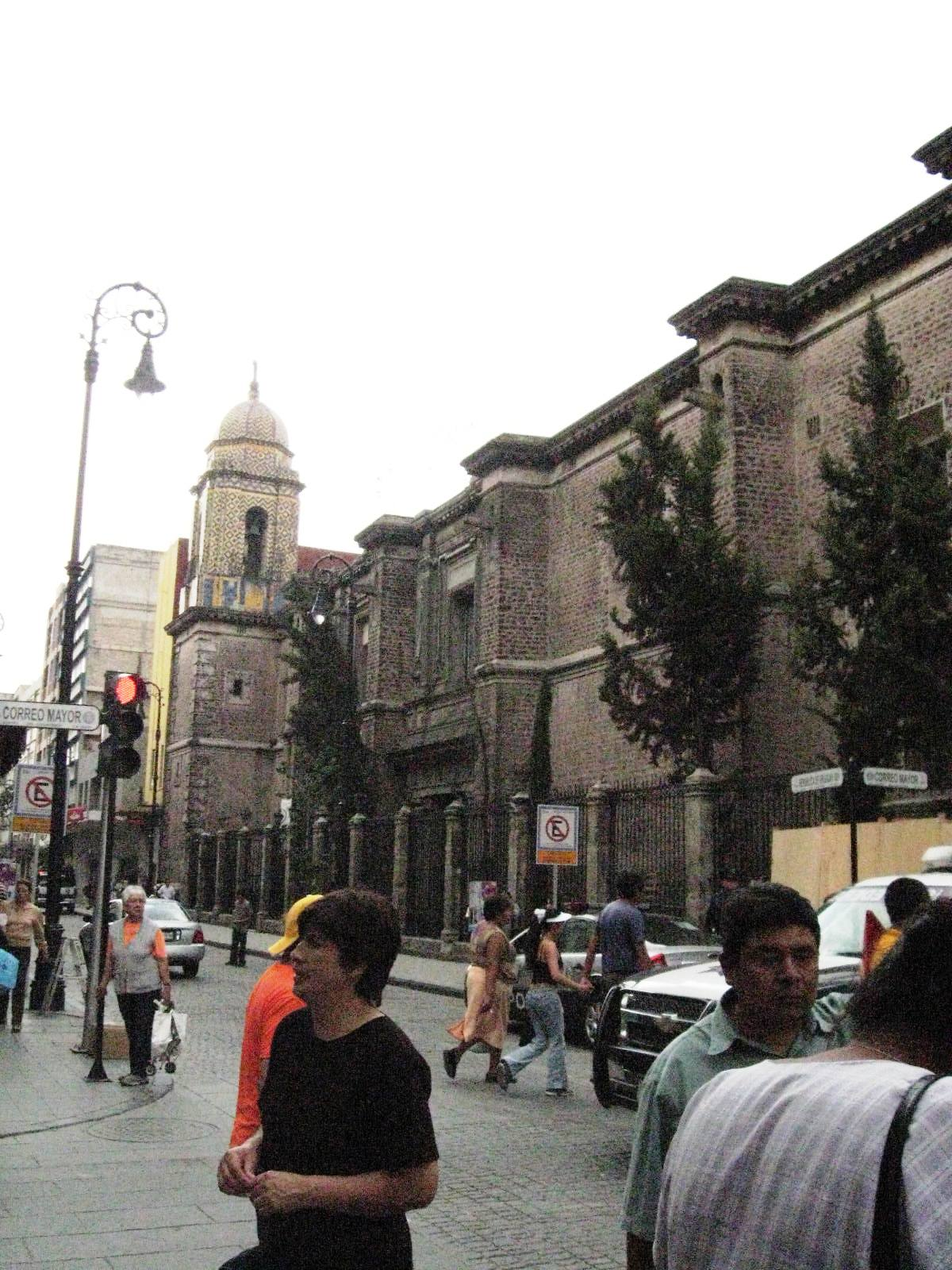

Location
- Country: Mexico
- Metropolitan: Immediately exempt to the Holy See
- Headquarters: Álvaro Obregón, Mexico City, Mexico

Statistics
- Population: (as of 2023); 170,300
- Parishes: 10

Information
- Denomination: Catholic Church
- Sui iuris church: Maronite Church
- Rite: West Syriac Rite
- Established: 6 November 1995; 30 years ago
- Cathedral: Nuestra Señora de Valvanera Cathedral
- Secular priests: 15

Current leadership
- Pope: Leo XIV
- Patriarch: Bechara Boutros al-Rahi
- Eparch: Vacant
- Apostolic Administrator: Elie Mikhael
- Bishops emeritus: Georges Saad Abi Younes, OLM

Website
- http://www.sancharbel.org.mx/

Maronite Catholic Eparchy of Our Lady of the Martyrs of Lebanon in Mexico City (in Latin: Eparchy Dominae Nostrae Martyrum Libanensium in Civitate Mexicana Maronitarum) is an eparchy of the Maronite Church immediately subject to the Holy See in Mexico. In 2010 there were 160,000 members.

== Territory and statistics ==
The eparchy has jurisdiction over the Maronite faithful of the whole of Mexico. Its eparchial seat is Mexico City, where is located the Nuestra Señora de Valvanera Cathedral.

In Mexico Maronites are present in Puebla, Toluca, Pachuca, Torreon, Veracruz, Chihuahua, Mérida, Guadalajara, Veracruz, Coahuila and Mexico City. On 6 November 2010, the proto-parish devoted (being the first) to Saint Charbel in Chihuahua, was consecrated by the hands of Monsignor George Abi-Younes, Monsignor Constancio Miranda, Archbishop of Chihuahua, Monsignor Juan Guillermo Lopez, bishop of Cuauhtémoc-Madera and Bishop Gerardo Rojas Lopez, bishop of Nuevo Casas Grandes.

In 2010, the territory was divided into seven parishes and there were 160,000 Lebanese Maronite Catholics.

== History ==
Since the 1960s immigrants began to arrive in Mexico from Lebanon and churches have been founded for the celebration of Maronite Masses. In 1960 the first three Maronite priests—Antonio Abiyunes, Antonio Abou Sleiman and Jose Bustany—arrived in Mexico City for the pastoral care of the faithful of the Maronite Church. The increasing number of Lebanese immigrants made it necessary to form a new church structure for the Maronite Catholic Church in Mexico.

One of the initiatives to improve pastoral care of the Maronites was made by Eparch Tayah in the translation of the Maronite Missal by its priests into Spanish, instructing the priest Alberto Meouchi to conduct a Missal and Lectionary for the altar and other prayer books for the faithful. Both Spanish and Arabic are used in three parishes of the eparchy.

The eparchy was erected on 6 November 1995 with the papal bull Cum Christifideles by Pope John Paul II.

Other initiatives carried out by Eparch Tayah were to remodel the Church of Nuestra Señora de Valvanera, Mexico City, current Maronite Cathedral as well as the acquisition of the Episcopal residence.

== Eparchs ==
- Pierre Wadih Tayah (6 November 1995 – 4 May 2002)
- Georges Saad Abi Younes, OLM, (22 February 2003 – 10 July 2024), retired
  - Apostolic Administrator Elie Mikhael (10 July 2024 – Present)
