= Our Lady of Lebanon Procathedral, Bogotá =

Our Lady of Lebanon Procathedral
- Procatedral de Nuestra Señora del Líbano
- Location: Bogotá
- Country: Colombia
- Denomination: Catholic Church (Maronite or Antiochian rite)

The Our Lady of Lebanon Procathedral (Spanish: Procatedral de Nuestra Señora del Líbano ) also called Catholic Maronite Cathedral of Bogotá or Church of Our Lady of Lebanon And alternatively Church of Santa Clara de Assís (Church of St. Clare of Assisi) is the name that receives a temple that belongs to the Catholic Church that is located in the Carrera 8A N ° 98–31 to the north of the city of Bogotá the capital of the South American country of Colombia. The congregation uses the Maronite rite in full communion with the Holy See in Rome.

The church is the procathedral or temporary headquarters of the Catholic Maronite Apostolic Exarch of Colombia (Exarchatus Apostolicus Columbiae) which uses a church ceded by the Latin rite Archdiocese of Bogotá and was created by Pope Francis on January 20, 2016 to attend to the needs Religious of the Catholic community Maronite in Colombia that until now had to attend other Catholic churches of Roman or Latin rite.

The temple is attended by Father Fadi Abou Chebel of the Maronite Order Mariamita (Ordo Maronita Beatae Mariae Virginis).

== See also ==
- Roman Catholicism in Colombia
