= Elias El-Debei =

Syrian Melkite Greek Catholic archbishop (born 1970)

His Eminence Elias El-Debei
- Archbishop of Bosra and Hauran
- Church: Melkite Greek Catholic Church
- Archdiocese: Bosra and Hauran
- See: Khabab, Syria
- Installed: 22 December 2018
- Predecessor: Nicolas Antiba
- Previous post: Patriarchal Administrator of Archeparchy of Bosra e Haūrān (2018)

Orders
- Ordination: 8 September 1998 by François Abou Mokh
- Consecration: 1 February 2019 by Youssef Absi, Nicolas Antiba and Jean-Abdo Arbach

Personal details
- Born: Elias El-Debei; 27 September 1970 (age 56) Damascus, Syria
- Education: Damascus University

Elias El-Debei (also spelled Al-Debei; born 27 September 1970) is a Syrian Melkite Catholic hierarch, who has served as the Archbishop of the Archeparchy of Bosra and Hauran (based in Khabab, Syria).

== Biography ==
=== Early life and priesthood ===
Elias El-Debei was born on 27 September 1970 in Damascus, Syria. He earned a licentiate in applied sciences from Damascus University and subsequently completed his philosophical and theological studies at the St. Paul Institute in Harissa, Lebanon. He received his priestly ordination on 8 September 1998 for Melkite Greek Catholic Archeparchy of Damascus.

Prior to his episcopal appointment, El-Debei reached the rank of archimandrite and held several administrative and pastoral responsibilities within the Melkite Church in Syria. He served at the parish of the prophet Elias in Ma'arra, at the parish of Our Lady of Peace in Harasta, and at the Patriarchs of Cathedral, the Lady of the Niah in Damascus. He was the head of the Patriarchal Office from 2008 to 2018 and served as a judge in the Church Court. From March 2018 he was a Patriarchal Administrator of Archeparchy of Bosra e Haūrān.

=== Episcopal ministry ===
Following his election by the Synod of the Melkite Greek Catholic Church, Pope Francis granted his assent to El-Debei's appointment as the Archbishop of Bosra and Hauran on 22 December 2018, succeeding Archbishop Nicolas Antiba.

El-Debei was consecrated as a bishop on 1 February 2019. The principal consecrator was Melkite Patriarch Youssef Absi, with Archbishop Nicolas Antiba and Archbishop Jean-Abdo Arbach serving as co-consecrators. As archbishop, El-Debei manages the spiritual and humanitarian challenges faced by the diocese in southern Syria, cooperating with regional ecumenical organizations like the Middle East Council of Churches (MECC) to support local Christian communities.
