= List of Catholic archdioceses =

The following is a current list of Catholic archdioceses ordered by continent and country (for the Latin Church) and by liturgical rite (for the Eastern Catholic Churches).

Many smaller countries, as well as large countries with small Catholic populations, lack (the need for) ecclesiastical province(s) and hence for large Metropolitan archdioceses and may rather have canonical jurisdictions that are immediately subject to the Holy See – dioceses, ordinariates, apostolic vicariates, apostolic exarchates, territorial prelatures, apostolic administrations, apostolic prefectures and/or missions sui iuris (all of which may also exist in countries with one or more archdioceses).

== Current Latin Church Archdioceses ==
=== Current Latin in Europe ===
- Albania - Shkodër–Pult, Tiranë–Durrës
- Austria - Salzburg, Vienna
- Belarus - Minsk–Mohilev
- Belgium - Mechelen–Brussels
- Bosnia and Herzegovina - Vrhbosna
- Croatia - Đakovo–Osijek, Rijeka, Split-Makarska, Zadar, Zagreb
- Czech Republic - Olomouc, Prague
- England and Wales - Birmingham, Cardiff-Menevia, Liverpool, Southwark, Westminster
- France
  - Metropolitan Archdioceses: Besançon, Bordeaux, Clermont, Dijon, Lille, Lyon, Marseille, Montpellier, Paris, Poitiers, Reims, Rennes, Rouen, Toulouse, Tours
  - Archdioceses: Aix, Albi, Auch, Avignon, Bourges, Cambrai, Chambéry–Saint-Jean-de-Maurienne–Tarentaise, Sens, Strasbourg
- Germany - Bamberg, Berlin, Freiburg im Breisgau, Hamburg, Köln, München und Freising, Paderborn
- Gibraltar - Directly subject to the Holy See
- Greece - Corfu, Zakynthos and Cefalonia, Naxos, Andros, Tinos and Mykonos, Athens, Rhodes
- Hungary - Eger, Esztergom-Budapest, Kalocsa-Kecskemét, Veszprém
- Ireland (including Northern Ireland) - Armagh, Cashel, Dublin, Tuam
- Italy (including Vatican City and San Marino)
  - Patriarchate: Patriarchate of Venice
  - Metropolitan Archdioceses: Agrigento, Ancona-Osimo, Bari-Bitonto, Benevento, Bologna, Cagliari, Campobasso-Boiano, Catania, Catanzaro-Squillace, Chieti-Vasto, Cosenza-Bisignano, Fermo, Firenze, Foggia-Bovino, Genova, Gorizia, L'Aquila, Lecce, Messina-Lipari-Santa Lucia del Mela, Milano, Modena-Nonantola, Napoli, Oristano, Palermo, Perugia-Città della Pieve, Pesaro, Pescara-Penne, Pisa, Potenza-Muro Lucano-Marsico Nuovo, Ravenna-Cervia, Reggio Calabria-Bova, Roma, Salerno-Campagna-Acerno, Sassari, Siena-Colle di Val d'Elsa-Montalcino, Siracusa, Taranto, Turin, Trento, Udine, Vercelli
  - Archdioceses: Acerenza, Amalfi–Cava de' Tirreni, Brindisi-Ostuni, Camerino-San Severino Marche, Capua, Crotone-Santa Severina, Ferrara-Comacchio, Gaeta, Lanciano-Ortona, Lucca, Manfredonia-Vieste-San Giovanni Rotondo, Matera-Irsina, Monreale, Otranto, Rossano-Cariati, Sant'Angelo dei Lombardi-Conza-Nusco-Bisaccia, Sorrento-Castellammare di Stabia, Spoleto-Norcia, Trani-Barletta-Bisceglie, Urbino-Urbania-Sant'Angelo in Vado
- Latvia - Riga
- Liechtenstein - Vaduz
- Lithuania - Kaunas, Vilnius
- Luxembourg - Luxembourg
- Malta - Malta
- Monaco - Monaco
- Montenegro - Bar
- Netherlands - Utrecht
- Poland - Białystok, Częstochowa, Gdańsk, Gniezno, Katowice, Kraków, Łódź, Lublin, Poznań, Przemyśl, Szczecin-Kamień, Warmia, Warsaw, Wrocław
- Portugal - Patriarchate of Lisbon, Braga, Évora
- Romania - Bucharest, Alba Iulia
- Russia - Mother of God at Moscow
- Scotland - Glasgow, Saint Andrews and Edinburgh
- Serbia - Belgrade
- Slovakia - Bratislava, Trnava, Košice
- Slovenia - Ljubljana, Maribor
- Spain - Barcelona, Burgos, Granada, Madrid, Mérida–Badajoz, Oviedo, Pamplona and Tudela, Santiago de Compostela, Seville, Tarragona, Toledo, Valencia, Valladolid, Zaragoza, West Indies (ext.)
- Ukraine - Lviv

=== Current Latin in the Americas ===
==== Current Latin in Central America and Caribbean ====
- Antilles - Castries, Fort-de-France, Kingston, Nassau, Port of Spain
- Costa Rica - San José de Costa Rica
- Cuba - Camagüey, San Cristóbal de la Habana, Santiago de Cuba
- Dominican Republic - Santiago de los Caballeros, Santo Domingo
- El Salvador - San Salvador
- Guatemala - Guatemala, Los Altos Quetzaltenango-Totonicapán
- Haiti - Cap-Haïtien, Port-au-Prince
- Honduras - Tegucigalpa, San Pedro Sula
- Nicaragua - Managua
- Panama - Panamá
- Puerto Rico (U.S.) - San Juan de Puerto Rico

==== Current Latin in North America ====
- Canada
  - Metropolitan archdioceses: Edmonton, Gatineau, Grouard-McLennan, Halifax, Keewatin-Le Pas, Kingston, Moncton, Montréal, Ottawa, Québec, Regina, Rimouski, Saint-Boniface, St. John's, Sherbrooke, Toronto (Latin), Vancouver
  - Immediately subject to the Holy See: Winnipeg (Latin)
- Mexico - Acapulco, Antequera, Chihuahua, Durango, Guadalajara, Hermosillo, Jalapa, León, México, Monterrey, Morelia, Puebla de los Angeles, San Luis Potosí, Tlalnepantla, Tijuana, Tulancingo, Tuxtla Gutiérrez, Yucatán
- United States - Anchorage–Juneau, Atlanta, Baltimore, Boston, Chicago, Cincinnati, Denver, Detroit, Dubuque, Galveston–Houston, Hartford, Indianapolis, Kansas City in Kansas, Las Vegas, Los Angeles, Louisville, Miami, Milwaukee, Mobile, Newark, New Orleans, New York, Oklahoma City, Omaha, Philadelphia, Portland in Oregon, Saint Louis, Saint Paul and Minneapolis, San Antonio, San Francisco, Santa Fe, Seattle, Washington, San Juan de Puerto Rico, United States Military Services

==== Current Latin in South America ====
- Argentina - Bahía Blanca, Buenos Aires, Córdoba, Corrientes, La Plata, Mendoza, Mercedes-Luján, Paraná, Resistencia, Rosario, Salta, San Juan de Cuyo, Santa Fe de la Vera Cruz, Tucumán
- Bolivia -Cochabamba, La Paz, Santa Cruz de la Sierra, Sucre
- Brazil - Aparecida, Aracaju, Belém do Pará, Belo Horizonte, Botucatu, Brasília, Campinas, Campo Grande, Cascavel, Cuiabá, Curitiba, Diamantina, Feira de Santana, Florianópolis, Fortaleza, Goiânia, Juiz de Fora, Londrina, Maceió, Manaus, Mariana, Maringá, Montes Claros, Natal, Niterói, Olinda e Recife, Palmas, Paraíba, Passo Fundo, Pelotas, Porto Alegre, Porto Velho, Pouso Alegre, Ribeirão Preto, Santa Maria, Santarém, São Luís do Maranhão, São Paulo, São Salvador da Bahia, São Sebastião do Rio de Janeiro, Sorocaba, Teresina, Uberaba, Vitória, Vitória da Conquista
- Chile - Antofagasta, Concepción, La Serena, Puerto Montt, Santiago de Chile
- Colombia - Barranquilla, Bogotá, Bucaramanga, Cali, Cartagena, Ibagué, Manizales, Medellín, Nueva Pamplona, Popayán, Santa Fe de Antioquía, Tunja, Villavicencio
- Ecuador - Cuenca, Guayaquil, Portoviejo, Quito
- Paraguay - Asunción
- Peru - Arequipa, Ayacucho, Cusco, Huancayo, Lima, Piura, Trujillo
- Uruguay - Montevideo
- Venezuela - Barquisimeto, Calabozo, Caracas Santiago de Venezuela, Ciudad Bolívar, Coro, Cumaná, Maracaibo, Mérida, Valencia en Venezuela

=== Current Latin in Asia ===
- Bangladesh - Dhaka, Chittagong
- China - Anking, Canton, Changsha, Chungking, Foochow, Hangchow, Hankow, Kaifeng, Kunming, Kweyang, Lanchow, Shenyang, Nanchang, Nanking, Nanning, Peking, Sian, Suiyüan, Taiyüan, Tsinan
- India - Agra, Bangalore, Bhopal, Bombay, Calcutta, Calicut, Cuttack-Bhubaneswar, Delhi, Gandhinagar, Goa and Daman, Guwahati, Hyderabad, Imphal, Madras and Mylapore, Madurai, Nagpur, Patna, Pondicherry and Cuddalore, Raipur, Ranchi, Shillong, Trivandrum, Verapoly, Visakhapatnam
- Indonesia - Ende, Jakarta, Kupang, Makassar, Medan, Merauke, Palembang, Pontianak, Samarinda, Semarang
- Iran - Tehran–Isfahan
- Iraq - Baghdad
- Israel, Palestine, Jordan and Cyprus - Patriarchate of Jerusalem
- Japan - Nagasaki, Osaka, Tokyo
- Kazakhstan - Maria Santissima in Astana
- Korea (Republic of Korea and Democratic People's Republic of Korea) - Daegu, Gwangju, Seoul
- Macau - Roman Catholic Diocese of Macau
- Malaysia - Kuala Lumpur, Kota Kinabalu, Kuching,
- Myanmar - Mandalay, Taunggyi, Yangon
- Pakistan - Karachi, Lahore
- Philippines - Cáceres, Cagayan de Oro, Capiz, Cebu, Cotabato, Davao, Jaro, Lingayen-Dagupan, Lipa, Manila, Nueva Segovia, Ozamis, Palo, San Fernando, Tuguegarao, Zamboanga
- Singapore - Singapore
- Sri Lanka - Colombo
- Taiwan - Taipei
- Thailand - Bangkok, Thare and Nonseng
- Turkey - İzmir
- Vietnam - Hanoi, Huế, Ho Chi Minh City

=== Current Latin in Oceania ===
- Australia - Adelaide, Brisbane, Canberra and Goulburn, Hobart, Melbourne, Perth, Sydney
- New Zealand - Wellington
- Pacific - Agaña, Nouméa, Papeete, Samoa-Apia, Suva
- Papua New Guinea - Madang, Mount Hagen, Port Moresby, Rabaul
- Solomon Islands - Honiara

=== Current Latin in Africa ===
- Algeria - Algiers
- Angola - Huambo, Luanda, Lubango, Malanje, Saurímo
- Benin - Cotonou, Parakou
- Burkina Faso - Bobo-Dioulasso, Koupéla, Ouagadougou
- Burundi - Bujumbura, Gitega
- Cameroon - Bamenda, Bertoua, Douala, Garoua, Yaoundé
- Central African Republic - Bangui, Berbérati
- Chad - N'Djaména
- Congo - Brazzaville, Owando, Pointe-Noire
- Democratic Republic of Congo - Bukavu, Kananga, Kinshasa, Kisangani, Lubumbashi, Mbandaka-Bikoro
- Equatorial Guinea - Malabo
- Gabon - Libreville
- Ghana - Accra, Cape Coast, Kumasi, Tamale
- Guinea - Conakry
- Ivory Coast - Abidjan, Bouaké, Gagnoa, Korhogo
- Kenya - Kisumu, Mombasa, Nairobi, Nyeri
- Lesotho - Maseru
- Liberia - Monrovia
- Madagascar - Antananarivo, Antsiranana, Fianarantsoa, Toliara
- Malawi - Blantyre, Lilongwe
- Mali - Bamako
- Morocco - Rabat, Tanger
- Mozambique - Beira, Maputo, Nampula
- Namibia - Windhoek
- Nigeria - Abuja, Benin City, Calabar, Ibadan, Jos, Kaduna, Lagos, Onitsha, Owerri
- Rwanda - Kigali
- Senegal - Dakar
- Sierra Leone - Freetown
- South Africa - Bloemfontein, Cape Town, Durban, Johannesburg, Pretoria
- South Sudan - Juba
- Sudan - Khartoum
- Tanzania - Arusha, Dar-es-Salaam, Mwanza, Songea, Tabora
- Togo - Lomé
- Tunisia - Tunis
- Uganda - Gulu, Kampala, Mbarara, Tororo
- Zambia - Kasama, Lusaka
- Zimbabwe - Bulawayo, Harare

== Current Eastern Catholic Archeparchies (Archdioceses) ==
Several smaller particular churches sui iuris have no single archbishopric.

=== Current Byzantine ===
- Melkite Greek Catholic Church
  - Syria - Damascus (Patriarchal See of Antioch), Aleppo (nominally Metropolitan), Bosra and Hauran (nominally Metropolitan), Homs (nominally Metropolitan), Latakia and the Valley of the Christians
  - Egypt, Sudan and South Sudan - as titular Patriarch of Alexandria.
  - Lebanon - Baalbek, Baniyas and Marjeyoun (suffragan of Tyre), Beirut and Byblos (nominally Metropolitan), Sidon and Deir el-Kamar (suffragan of Tyre), Tripoli (suffragan of Tyre), Tyre, Zahle and Forzol and all the Bekaa
  - Israel and the Palestinian territories - Jerusalem of the Melkites (a patriarchal vicariate), Akka
  - Jordan - Petra and Philadelphia in Amman and all Transjordan
- Romanian Greek Catholic Church - Archeparchy of Fagaraș and Alba Iulia (Major Archbishopric)
- Ukrainian Greek Catholic Church
  - Ukraine - Kyiv–Halych (the Major Archdiocese in chief), Ivano-Frankivsk, Lviv, Ternopil–Zboriv
  - Elsewhere - Przemyśl–Warsaw (Metropolitan of the province in Poland), Winnipeg (Metropolitan of the province in Canada), Philadelphia (Metropolitan of the USA province), São João Batista em Curitiba (Metropolitan of the Brazilian province)
- Hungarian Greek Catholic Church - Archeparchy of Hajdúdorog (Metropolitanate in chief)
- Ruthenian Greek Catholic Church - Archeparchy of Pittsburgh (Metropolitan Archdiocese in chief)
- Slovak Byzantine Catholic Church - Metropolitan Archeparchy of Prešov (in chief)

=== Current Alexandrian ===
- Coptic Catholic Church - Patriarchate of Alexandria (in chief)
- Ethiopic Catholic Church - Metropolitan Archeparchy of Addis Abeba (in chief)
- Eritrean Catholic Church - Metropolitan Archeparchy of Asmara (in chief)

=== Current Armenian ===
- Armenian Catholic Church - Patriarchate of Cilicia (also Archeparchy of Beirut), Aleppo of the Armenians (or Halab or Beroea), Baghdad of the Armenians, Istanbul (Constantinople), Lviv of the Armenians

=== Current West Syriac ===
- Syriac Maronite Church - Patriarchate of Antioch, Damascus, Aleppo, Antelias, Beirut, Tripoli, Tyre, Haifa and the Holy Land, Cyprus
- Syriac Catholic Church - Patriarchate of Antioch (in chief)
- Syro-Malankara Catholic Church - Major Archeparchy of Trivandrum (the Major Archbishop, in chief), Archeparchy of Tiruvalla

=== Current East Syriac ===
- Chaldean Catholic Church - Patriarchate of Babylon, Baghdad (Metropolitan), Kirkuk (Metropolitan), Tehran (Metropolitan), Urmia (Metropolitan), Ahwaz, Basra, Diyarbakir, Erbil, Mosul
- Syro-Malabar Catholic Church - Eranakulam-Angamaly (Major Archdiocese, in chief), Changanassery, Tellicherry, Thrissur, Kottayam

== Former and Titular Archdioceses ==
=== Latin ===
- Archdiocese of Achrida (Ohrid, North Macedonia)
- Archdiocese of Aegina (Aegina, Greece)
- Archdiocese of Amasea (Amasya, Turkey)
- Archdiocese of Amastris (Amasra, Turkey)
- Archdiocese of Amorium (Amorium, Turkey)
- Archdiocese of Anasartha (Khanasir, Syria)
- Archdiocese of Anchialus (Pomorie, Bulgaria)
- Archdiocese of Ancyra (Ankara, Turkey)
- Archdiocese of Antinoe (Antinoöpolis, Egypt)
- Archdiocese of Antiochia in Pisidia (Antioch of Pisidia, Turkey)
- Archdiocese of Apamea in Bithynia (Apamea Myrlea, Turkey)
- Archdiocese of Aprus (Apros, Turkey)
- Patriarchate of Aquileia (Aquileia, Italy)
- Archdiocese of Arcadiopolis in Europa (Lüleburgaz, Turkey)
- Archdiocese of Beroea (Aleppo, Syria)
- Archdiocese of Beroë (Stara Zagora, Bulgaria)
- Archdiocese of Bizya (Vize, Turkey)
- Archdiocese of Bosporus (Kerch, Ukraine)
- Archdiocese of Bostra (Bosra, Syria)
- Archdiocese of Brysis (Pınarhisar, Turkey)
- Archdiocese of Caesarea in Palaestina (Caesarea Maritima, Israel)
- Archdiocese of Callinicum (Raqqa, Syria)
- Archdiocese of Camachus (Kemah, Turkey)
- Archdiocese of Carpathus (Karpathos, Greece)
- Archdiocese of Carthage (Carthage, Tunisia)
- Archdiocese of Chalcedonia (Chalcedon, Turkey)
- Archdiocese of Chalcis in Syria (Qinnasrin, Syria)
- Archdiocese of Chersonesus in Zechia (Chersonesus, Ukraine)
- Archdiocese of Cius (Cius, Turkey)
- Archdiocese of Claudiopolis in Honoriade (Bolu, Turkey)
- Archdiocese of Colonia in Armenia (Koyulhisar, Turkey)
- Archdiocese of Corinthus (Corinth, Greece)
- Archdiocese of Cotrada (Cotrada, Turkey)
- Archdiocese of Cotyaeum (Kütahya, Turkey)
- Archdiocese of Cypsela (İpsala, Turkey)
- Archdiocese of Cyrrhus (Cyrrhus, Syria)
- Archdiocese of Cyzicus (Cyzicus, Turkey)
- Archdiocese of Damascus (Damascus, Syria)
- Archdiocese of Darnis (Derna, Libya)
- Archdiocese of Dercos (Yeşilköy, Turkey)
- Archdiocese of Doclea (Doclea, Montenegro)
- Archdiocese of Drizipara (Drizipara, Turkey)
- Archdiocese of Ephesus (Ephesus, Turkey)
- Archdiocese of Euchaitae (Euchaita, Turkey)
- Archdiocese of Gabala (Jableh, Syria)
- Archdiocese of Gangra (Çankırı, Turkey)
- Archdiocese of Garella (Garella, Turkey)
- Archdiocese of Germa in Hellesponto (Germa in Hellesponto, Turkey)
- Archdiocese of Germia (Germia, Turkey)
- Archdiocese of Hadrianopolis in Haemimonto (Edirne, Turkey)
- Archdiocese of Heliopolis in Phoenicia (Baalbek, Lebanon)
- Archdiocese of Hemesa (Homs, Syria)
- Archdiocese of Heraclea in Europa (Marmara Ereğlisi, Turkey)
- Archdiocese of Hierapolis in Phrygia (Hierapolis, Turkey)
- Archdiocese of Iconium (Konya, Turkey)
- Archdiocese of Justiniana Prima (Justiniana Prima, Serbia)
- Archdiocese of Larissa in Thessalia (Larissa, Greece)
- Archdiocese of Lauriacum (Enns, Austria)
- Archdiocese of Lemnus (Lemnos, Greece)
- Archdiocese of Leontopolis in Augustamnica (Leontopolis, Egypt)
- Archdiocese of Leontopolis in Pamphylia (Ulupınar, Turkey)
- Archdiocese of Leucas (Lefkada, Greece)
- Archdiocese of Luxemburgum (Luxembourg City, Luxemburg)
- Archdiocese of Maronea (Maroneia, Greece)
- Archdiocese of Martyropolis (Silvan, Turkey)
- Archdiocese of Maximianopolis in Rhodope (Mosynopolis, Greece)
- Archdiocese of Melitene (Malatya, Turkey)
- Archdiocese of Methymna (Mithymna, Greece)
- Archdiocese of Miletus (Miletus, Turkey)
- Archdiocese of Misthia (Misthia, Turkey)
- Archdiocese of Mitylene (Mytilene, Greece)
- Archdiocese of Mocissus (Kırşehir, Turkey)
- Archdiocese of Mopsuestia (Mopsuestia, Turkey)
- Archdiocese of Myra (Myra, Turkey)
- Archdiocese of Nacolia (Nakoleia, Turkey)
- Archdiocese of Neapolis in Pisidia (Neapolis, Turkey)
- Archdiocese of Neocaesarea in Ponto (Niksar, Turkey)
- Archdiocese of Nicaea (Nicaea, Turkey)
- Archdiocese of Nicaea Parva (Havsa, Turkey)
- Archdiocese of Nicomedia (Nicomedia, Turkey)
- Archdiocese of Nicopolis ad Nestum (Nicopolis ad Nestum, Bulgaria)
- Archdiocese of Nicopolis in Epiro (Nicopolis, Greece)
- Archdiocese of Nicopsis (Nicopsis)
- Archdiocese of Nicosia (Nicosia, Cyprus)
- Archdiocese of Nubia (Nubia)
- Archdiocese of Odessus (Varna, Bulgaria)
- Archdiocese of Oxyrhynchus (Oxyrhynchus, Egypt)
- Archdiocese of Paltus (Paltus, Syria)
- Archdiocese of Parium (Parium, Turkey)
- Archdiocese of Pedachtoë (Pedachtoë, Turkey)
- Archdiocese of Pelusium of the Romans (Pelusium, Egypt)
- Archdiocese of Perge (Perga, Turkey)
- Archdiocese of Pessinus (Pessinus, Turkey)
- Archdiocese of Petra in Palaestina (Petra, Jordan)
- Archdiocese of Philippi (Philippi, Greece)
- Archdiocese of Philippopolis in Thracia (Plovdiv, Bulgaria)
- Archdiocese of Pompeiopolis in Cilicia (Soli, Cilicia, Turkey)
- Archdiocese of Pompeiopolis in Paphlagonia (Pompeiopolis, Turkey)
- Archdiocese of Preslavus (Pliska, Bulgaria)
- Archdiocese of Ptolemais in Thebaide (Ptolemais Hermiou, Egypt)
- Archdiocese of Ratiaria (Ratiaria, Bulgaria)
- Archdiocese of Rhizaeum (Rize, Turkey)
- Archdiocese of Rhoina (Sultanhanı, Turkey)
- Archdiocese of Rhusium (Keşan, Turkey)
- Archdiocese of Salamis (Salamis, Cyprus)
- Archdiocese of Samosata (Samosata, Turkey)
- Archdiocese of Sardes (Sardis, Turkey)
- Archdiocese of Scythopolis (Beit She'an, Israel)
- Archdiocese of Sebastea (Sivas, Turkey)
- Archdiocese of Sebastopolis in Abasgia (Sukhumi, Georgia)
- Archdiocese of Seleucia in Isauria (Silifke, Turkey)
- Archdiocese of Selge (Selge, Turkey)
- Archdiocese of Selymbria (Silivri, Turkey)
- Archdiocese of Serrae (Serres, Greece)
- Archdiocese of Side (Side, Turkey)
- Archdiocese of Silyum (Silyum, Turkey)
- Archdiocese of Soteropolis (Soteropolis)
- Archdiocese of Stauropolis (Aphrodisias, Turkey)
- Archdiocese of Sugdaea (Sudak, Ukraine)
- Archdiocese of Synnada in Phrygia (Synnada in Phrygia, Turkey)
- Archdiocese of Tarsus (Tarsus, Turkey)
- Archdiocese of Ternobus (Veliko Tarnovo, Bulgaria)
- Archdiocese of Thebae (Thebes, Greece)
- Archdiocese of Thessalonica (Thessaloniki, Greece)
- Archdiocese of Tiburnia (Teurnia, Austria)
- Archdiocese of Tomi (Constanța, Romania)
- Archdiocese of Traianopolis in Rhodope (Traianoupoli, Greece)
- Archdiocese of Trapezus (Trabzon, Turkey)
- Archdiocese of Tyana (Tyana, Turkey)
- Archdiocese of Tyrus (Tyre, Lebanon)
- Archdiocese of Velebusdus (Kyustendil, Bulgaria)
- Archdiocese of Verissa (Verissa, Turkey)
- Archdiocese of Viminacium (Viminacium, Serbia)

== See also ==
- List of Catholic dioceses
- List of Catholic titular sees (defunct but nominally restored)
- List of Catholic military ordinariates
- List of Catholic apostolic administrations
- List of Catholic apostolic vicariates
- List of Eastern Catholic exarchates
- List of Catholic apostolic prefectures
- List of Catholic territorial prelatures
- List of Catholic missions sui juris
- List of diplomatic missions of the Holy See
- Patriarch

Non-Catholic

- List of Anglican Communion dioceses
- List of Eastern Orthodox bishops and archbishops
- List of Lutheran dioceses and archdioceses

== Notes ==
- The Antilles is nunciature to Antigua and Barbuda, Barbados, Bahamas, Belize, Dominica, Grenada, Guyana, Jamaica, Saint Kitts and Nevis, Saint Lucia, Suriname, Trinidad and Tobago, and Saint Vincent and the Grenadines
- The Pacific is nunciature to Cook Islands, Fiji, Micronesia, Kiribati, Marshall Islands, Nauru, Palau, Tonga, Vanuatu, and Samoa
