= Munir Altheeb =

Syrian historian (born 1942)

- Born: 1942 (age 83–84) khabab, Syria
- Occupation: Writer historian artist
- Writing career
- Subjects: Syria and the Middle-east
- Website: www.discover-syria.com

Munir Altheeb (Arabic: منير الذيب)(born 1942) is a notable Syrian scholar, artist and historian critic in the history and art, Member of the Arab Writers Union and member of the Heritage Preservation Commission Hauran, He contributed several books to a lot of Arab libraries in the Arab countries and contributed to many newspapers and magazines in Syria and the Arab Countries.

== Early life ==
Munir was born in Khabab, in southern Syria. He was the oldest boy in a family of three brothers and two daughters, born to a farmer's family in Khabab where he was educated in the primary schools and High School. He went on to study at the University of Damascus Faculty of Law (1958–1961). He became a teacher of art at the secondary level in 1965 when he finished High School . he Performed a number of art galleries and received.

== Career ==
The Syrian government sent him to Yemen in 1981 for teaching and he start there prepared and directed curriculum, books, and mapping at all stages in the Ministry of Education of Yemen. Published at that time more than ninety articles in newspapers and magazines since 1982 related to the Yemeni history and the Yemeni Art. when his return to Syria continued teaching in his hometown Khabab and joined to the Arab Writers Union and to the Heritage Preservation Commission Hauran.

== Works ==
His notable books in history are as follows:

1-Papers in the culture and history of Yaman.(Arabic).

2-Yemen's heritage to the contemporary.(Arabic :اليمن من التراث إلى المعاصرة).

3-Southern Syria Hauran.(Arabic :سورية الجنوبية (حوران)).

4-Glossary of cities and villages in the southern Levant (Syria).(Arabic :بلاد الشام الجنوبية سورية).
