= Boulos Nassif Borkhoche =

Lebanese priest and archbishop (1932–2021)

Boulos Nassif Borkhoche S.M.S.P.
- Archeparch of Bosra and Hauran
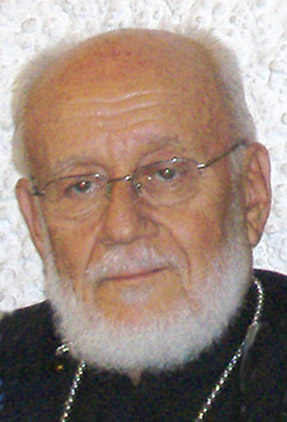
- Native name: بولس ناصيف برخوش
- Church: Melkite Greek Catholic Church
- Archdiocese: Archeparchy of Bosra and Hauran
- In office: 14 June 1983 – 15 September 2011
- Predecessor: Nicolas Naaman
- Successor: Nicolas Antiba

Orders
- Ordination: 14 September 1960
- Consecration: 3 July 1983 by Maximos V Hakim

Personal details
- Born: 7 October 1932 Joun, Mandatory Lebanese Republic, French Empire
- Died: 4 February 2021 (aged 88) Harissa-Daraoun, Keserwan-Jbeil Governorate, Lebanon

Boulos Nassif Borkhoche S.M.S.P. (born Paul Victor Borkhoche; 7 October 1932 – 4 February 2021) was a Lebanese-born Melkite Catholic hierarch, who had served an archbishop of the Melkite Greek Catholic Archeparchy of Bosra and Hauran in Syria from 1983 to 2011.

== Life ==
Boulos Nassif Borkhoche came from an old established and wealthy family in Joun, Lebanon, France. He was ordained to the priesthood on 14 September 1960 as Chaplain of the Missionary Society of Saint Paul.

On 14 June 1983, the Synod of Bishops of the Melkite Greek Catholic Church elected him as the successor to Archbishop Nicolas Naaman as Archbishop of Bosra and Hauran. The Patriarch of Antioch Archbishop Maximos V Hakim ordained him to the episcopate on 3 July 1983, together with the co-consecrators Archbishop Habib Bacha and Archbishop Joseph Raya.

Borkhoche was in October 2010 a participant in the Special Assembly of the Synod of Bishops on the Middle East. He was co-consecrator of the Archbishop Nikolaki Sawaf. On 15 September 2011 Pope Benedict XVI accepted his age-related retirement.
