= Archeparchy of Damascus =

Archeparchy of Damascus may refer to:

- Maronite Catholic Archeparchy of Damascus
- Syriac Catholic Archeparchy of Damascus
- Melkite Greek Catholic Archeparchy of Damascus
