= Basil Haggiar =

Syrian/Lebanese archbishop (1839–1919)

Basilio Haggiar BS
- (Arch)Eparch of Sidon
- Church: Melkite Greek Catholic Church
- Diocese: Eparchy of Sidon
- In office: 16 June 1886 – 1919
- Predecessor: Theodose Kuomgi
- Successor: Athanase Khoriaty
- Previous posts: Archeparch of Bosra and Hauran (1881-1886); Archeparchy of Bosra (1871-1881)

Orders
- Consecration: 1871 by Gregory II Youssef

Personal details
- Born: 6 January 1839
- Died: 1916 (aged 76–77)

Basilio Haggiar (6 January 1839 – 1919) was a Syrian archbishop of the Melkite Greek Catholic Archeparchy of Bosra and Hauran in Syria and Melkite Greek Catholic Archeparchy of Sidon in Lebanon.

== Life ==
Born on 6 January 1839, in Gezzin, Syria, Haggiar was appointed on 14 October 1871 as Bishop of Bosra and Hauran in Syria and was consecrated on 24 October 1871 to the bishopric. With the establishment of the Archeparchy of Bosra and Hauran in 1881, he has been implemented as Archbishop of Bosra and Hauran. In 1887, Haggiar took over the archbishopric of Sidon in Lebanon and died in 1919 after 47 years of episcopal life. His successor in Bosra and Hauran was Archbishop Nicolas Cadi and Atanasio Khoriaty in Sidon.
