= Günyüzü =

- District and municipality
- Map showing Günyüzü District in Eskişehir Province

- Location in Turkey Günyüzü (Turkey Central Anatolia)
- Coordinates: 39°23′02″N 31°48′36″E
- Country: Turkey
- Province: Eskişehir

Government
  - Mayor: Hidayet Özmen (BBP)
- Area: 828 km^{2} (320 sq mi)
- Elevation: 871 m (2,858 ft)
- Population (2022): 5,155
  - Density: 6.23/km^{2} (16.1/sq mi)
- Time zone: UTC+3 (TRT)
- Postal code: 26630
- Area code: 0222
- Website: www.gunyuzu.bel.tr

Günyüzü (Turkish: [ˈɟynjyzy]) is a municipality and district of Eskişehir Province, Turkey. Its area is 828 km^{2}, and its population is 5,155 (2022). Its elevation is 871 m (2,858 ft).

Günyüzü became a bucak (subdistrict) in 1932 and gained the status of a district in 1990.

It was in constant interaction with Sivrihisar during the Seljuk and Ottoman periods. It was the scene of important conflicts during the War of Independence and the historical richness of the region became more evident with the excavations.

== Places of interest ==
Ruins of the Byzantine shrine St Michael at Germia are located in the village of Gümüşkonak, formerly known as Yörme, 8 km south of Günyüzü.

== Composition ==
There are 22 neighbourhoods in Günyüzü District:

- Atlas
- Ayvalı
- Bedil
- Beyyayla
- Çakmak
- Çardaközü
- Doğray
- Fatih
- Gecek
- Gümüşkonak
- Kavacık
- Kavuncu
- Kayakent
- Kuzören
- Mercan
- Özler
- Sümer
- Tutlu
- Yağrı
- Yazır
- Yenikent
- Yeşilyaka
