= Nicolas Cadi =

- Archeparch of Bosra and Hauran
- Native name: نيكولا كيد
- Church: Melkite Greek Catholic Church
- Archdiocese: Archeparchy of Bosra and Hauran
- In office: 10 February 1889 – 16 November 1939
- Predecessor: Basil Haggiar
- Successor: Pierre Chami
- Other post: Titular Archeparch of Mocissus (1939-1941)

Orders
- Ordination: 21 November 1884
- Consecration: 10 February 1889 by Basilios Moussaye

Personal details
- Born: 29 June 1861 Damascus, Damascus Eyalet, Ottoman Empire
- Died: 1941 (aged 79–80)

Nicolas Cadi (born on 29 June 1861 in Damascus, Syria - died in 1941) was Archbishop of the Melkite Greek Catholic Archeparchy of Bosra and Hauran in Syria.

== Life ==
Nicolas Cadi was ordained priest on 21 November 1884. He was appointed on 10 February 1889 successor of Basil Haggiar as Archbishop of Bosra and Hauran and consecrated a bishop on the same day. On 16 November 1939 Cadi resigned and became Professor Emeritus at the same time appointed Titular Archbishop of Mocissus. Until his death in 1941 he was Archbishop Emeritus, and was co-consecrator of Archbishop Etienne Soukkarie. He was succeeded by Archbishop Pierre Chami SMSP after his death in 1941.
