= Paul Achkar =

Archbishop of the Melkite Greek Catholic Archeparchy of Latakia, Lebanon

Paul Achkar (3 February 1893 in Damascus, Syria - 23 April 1982) was the first Archbishop of the Melkite Greek Catholic Archeparchy of Latakia in Lebanon.

== Life ==
Paul Achkar was on August 15, 1921, ordained priest. He was appointed Archbishop of Latakia on 20 September 1961. His election was on November 11, 1961, and was confirmed by the Holy See. On 17 December 1961 he was consecrated by the Patriarch of Antioch Maximos IV Sayegh, SMSP and his co-consecrators were Archbishop Athanasios Toutoungi of Aleppo and Archbishop Joseph Tawil, Auxiliary Bishop of Antioch. Achkar was from 1962 to 1965 a participant in the four sessions of the Second Vatican Council. As co-consecrator he assisted in the episcopal ordinations of Bishop Justin Najmy, BA (Patriarchal Exarch of the United States), Nicolas Naaman, SMSP (Archbishop of Bosra and Hauran) and Joseph Raya (Archbishop of Akka). From 1974 to 1975 he was a part-time Patriarchal Vicar of Jerusalem. Following the provisions of age he became on 18 August 1981 at the age of 88 years, Archbishop emeritus, and until his death on 23 April 1982 Archbishop Emeritus of Latakia. His successor was Michel Yatim.
