= Melkite Greek Catholic Archeparchy of Bosra-Hauran =

Eastern Catholic archeparchy in Syria

Coordinates: 33.0108°N 36.2747°E

Archeparchy of Bosra and Hauran (Melkite Greek) Archeparchy Bostrena et Auranensis

Location
- Country: Syria

Statistics
- Population: (as of 2012); 27,000
- Parishes: 31

Information
- Denomination: Melkite Greek Catholic Church
- Rite: Byzantine Rite
- Established: 1881

Current leadership
- Pope: Leo XIV
- Patriarch: Youssef Absi
- Archeparch: Elias El-Debei

Melkite Greek Catholic Archeparchy of Bosra and Hauran (in Latin: Archeparchy Bostrena et Auranensis) is an archeparchy of the Melkite Greek Catholic Church with its territory located in Syria. It is currently governed by Archeparch Elias El-Debei.

== Territory and statistics ==
The archeparchy includes the region of Hawran, in southern Syria, bordering the states of Israel and Jordan. Its archeparchial seat is the city of Khabab, where the Cathedral of Our Lady of the Dormition is located.

The territory is divided into 31 parishes and has 27,000 baptized.

== History ==
It is not known the exact origin of the Christian community in this region: the seat goes back to the third century and about in Roman and Byzantine Bosra (or Bostra) there was an Ecclesiastical province with about 25 seats suffragan, and was full of churches and especially of monasteries. The ancient sources point about 15 archbishops known in Bostra. The last is Stefano, mentioned in 700 or so. Following the invasion of the Arab region, the headquarters disappeared.

Annuario Pontificio indicated 1687 as the date of founding of the Catholic eparchy in what the first time presents a Greek-Melkite Catholic bishop. However at the time of the schism of the Greek Orthodox Church of Antioch, which gave rise to the Melkite Greek Catholic Church (1724), does not seem that Bosra had a bishop. Only in 1763 the Melkite Catholic patriarch Michel Jawhar ordered for the seat of Bosra Archimandrite Francis Siaj. He was probably only a titular bishop; in fact, when he was elected patriarch (1796), did not bother and perhaps did not have time to appoint a successor on the seat he had left vacant.

In 1798 the new Patriarch Agapius II Matar, wanting to raise the episcopate his brother Athanasius, named him the Archbishop of Bosra; However, only two years later transferred him to the bishopric of Sidon.

The seat then had no bishops, neither residential nor holders until 1836. One of the first concerns of Patriarch Maximos III Mazloum was to visit in person this old archeparchy abandoned; noted the progress of Catholicism among the ranks of the Melkites, and then decided to restore the seat by appointing the monk Lazarus Fasfous, who took the name of Cyril. Since then, the venue has had an unbroken series of bishops.

The locations of Bosra and Hauran were united to the archeparchy in 1881.

According to some statistics, in 1907 the archeparchy counted 9,000 faithful, 9 churches and 18 priests. In 1909 it was also restored the seat of the Orthodox Eparchy of Bosra. Statistics published by the Congregation for the Oriental Churches in 1932 indicated the presence of 5,700 faithful, 10 churches and nine priests.

In 1932 it gave a portion of its territory for the creation of the Melkite Greek Catholic Archeparchy of Petra and Philadelphia in Amman of the Melkites. The bull of the erection of this ecclesiastical district determined the borders between the two Archeparchies, which coincide with political borders between Syria and Jordan.

Because of the instability of the region, the archeparch have often resided in Damascus. Nicolas Naaman was the first to reside permanently in the archeparchy.

== Eparchs ==
- Francis Siaj, B.S. † (23 December 1763 - 27 June 1796 confirmed as Melkite Patriarch of Antioch)
- Gérasime (bishop of Hauran mentioned in 1790)
- Gabriel Matar, B.S. (1798 consecrated - 1800 nominated eparch of Sidon)
- Sede vacante (1800-1836)
- Lazarus (Cyril) Fasfous, B.S. (1837 - 1858 deceased)
- Macaire (Ignatius) Akkawi (21 November 1859 consecrated - 7 August 1870 deceased)
- Basil Haggiar, B.S. (14 October 1871 consecrated - 16 June 1887 nominated eparch of Sidon)
- Nicolas Cadi (10 February 1889 - 16 November 1939 retired)
- Pierre Chami, S.M.S.P. (13 November 1943 - 19 August 1967 deceased)
- Nicolas Naaman, S.M.S.P. (23 August 1967 - 20 August 1982 deceased)
- Boulos Nassif Borkhoche, S.M.S.P. (14 June 1983 - 15 September 2011 retired)
- Nicolas Antiba, B.A. (2 May 2013 - 9 February 2018 appointed Patriarchal Vicar of Damascus)
- Elias El-Debei (since 22 December 2018)
