= Téléphérique (Jounieh) =

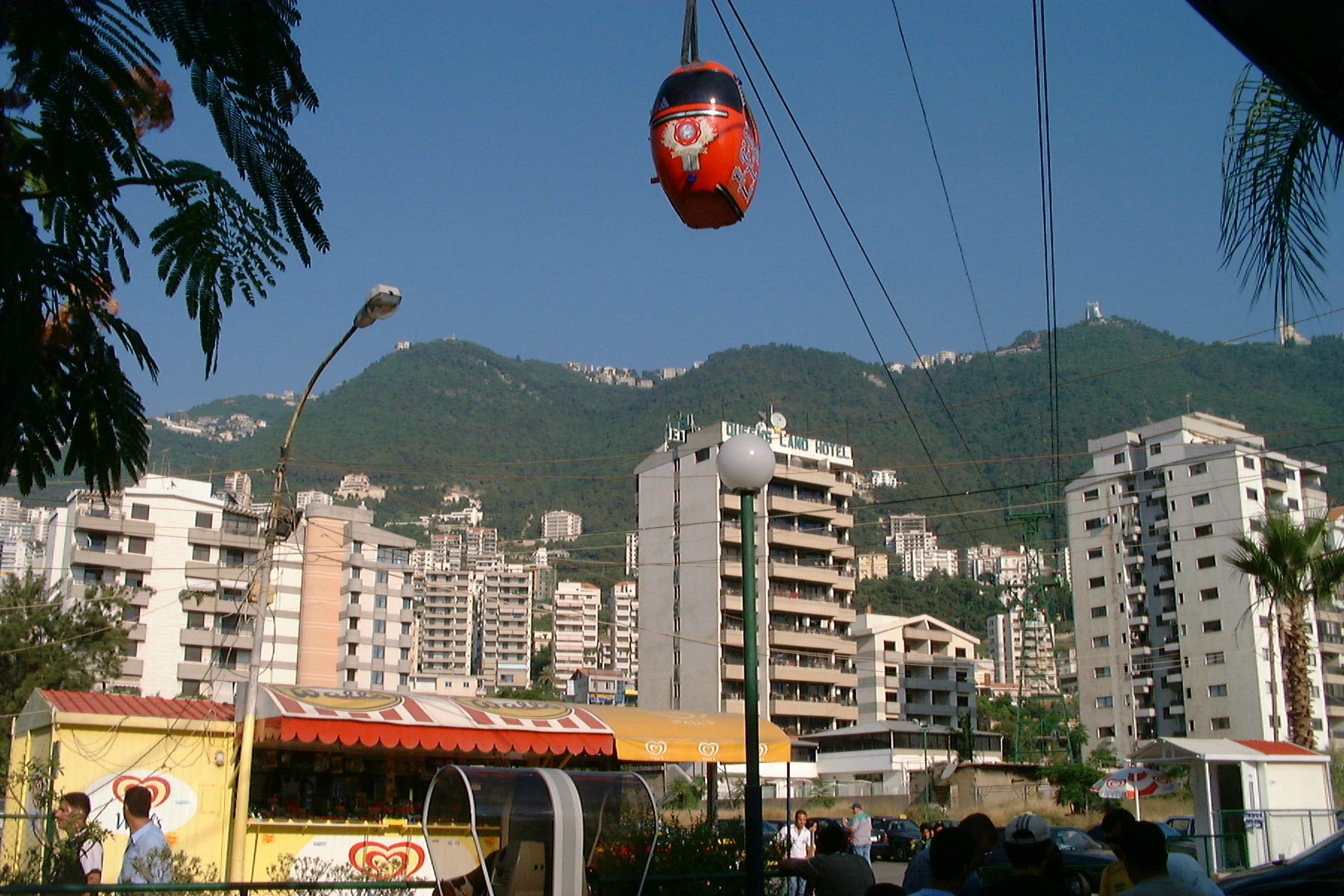
The téléphérique as seen from the ground.

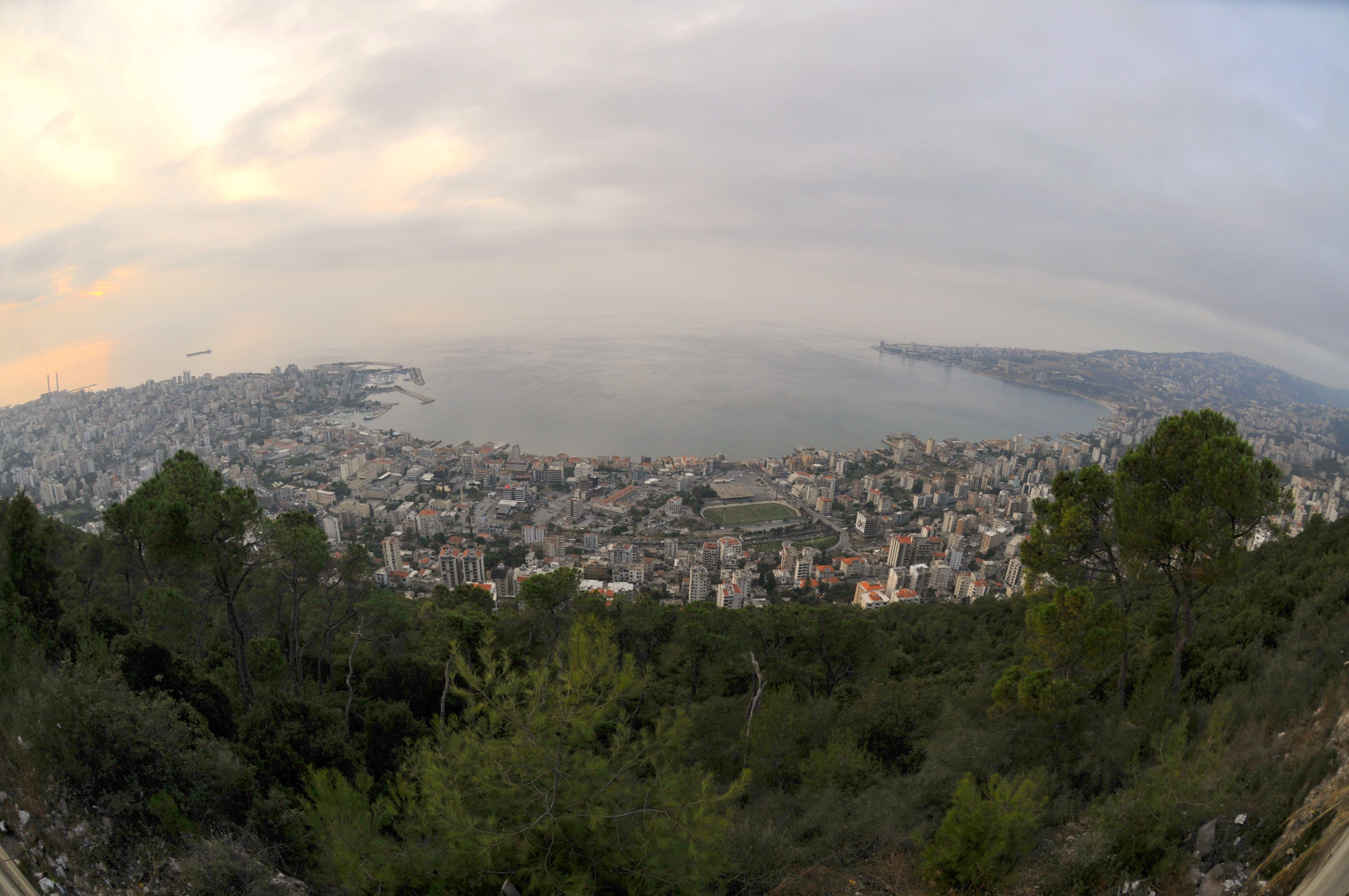
View from the top

The Téléphérique is a bicable gondola lift system located in Jounieh, a city in Lebanon 16 km (9.9 mi) north of Beirut. It was founded in 1965 and is owned and operated by Compagnie Libanaise du Telepherique et d' Expansion Touristique SAL.

In nine minutes, the 1.5 km (1 mi) long Téléphérique line transports passengers from the bay of Jounieh, above the maritime highway and a pine-forested steep mountain, to an altitude of 650 meters, arriving at the Our Lady of Lebanon shrine in Harissa. The trip offers "spectacularly dramatic views", including panoramic views over the bay. It is considered one of the most popular activities for tourists in Jounieh.
