= Jounieh =

Jounieh جونيه
- City
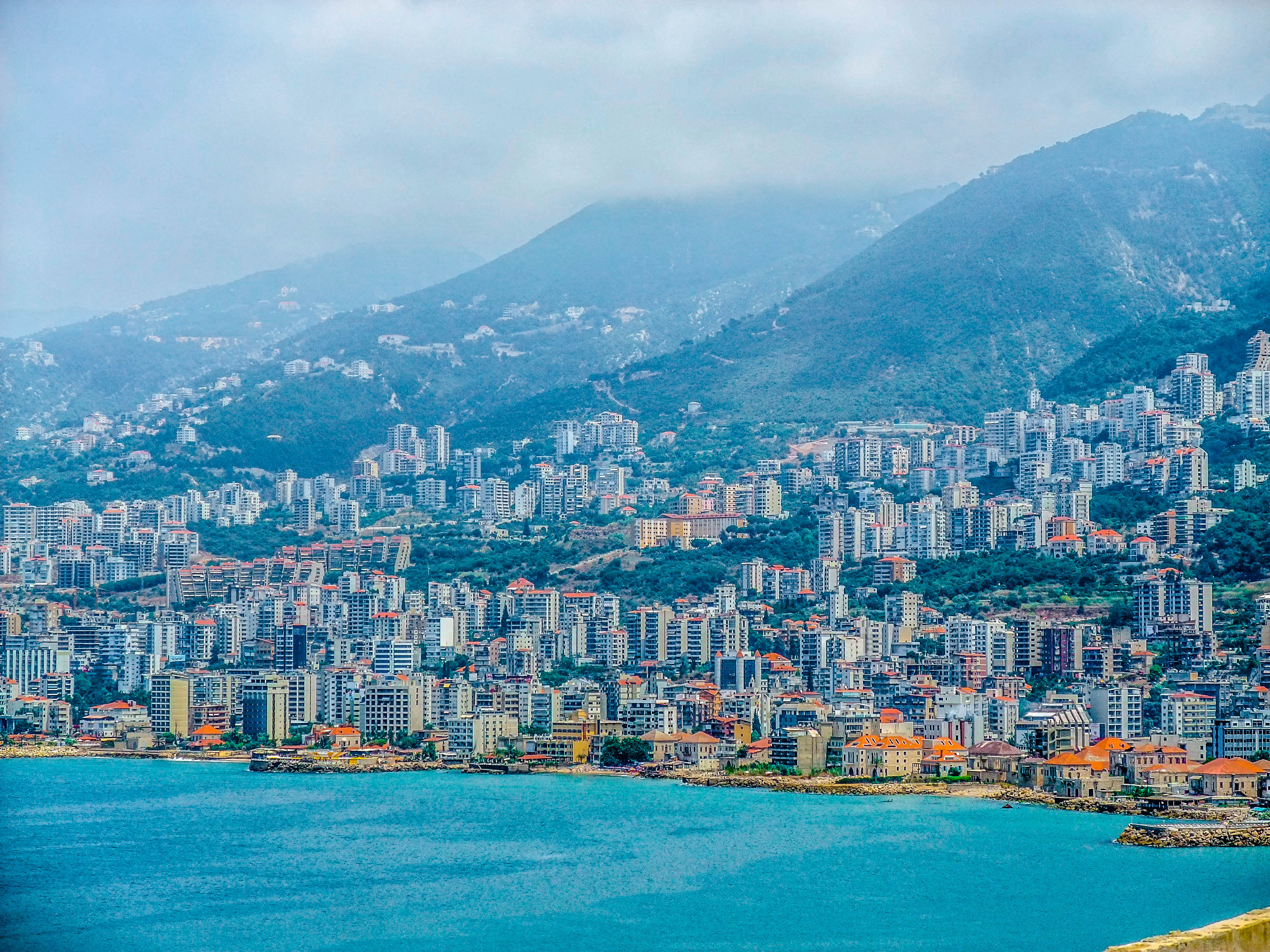
- Jounieh Bay

- Location in Lebanon
- Coordinates: 33°58′11″N 35°36′56″E
- Country: Lebanon
- Governorate: Keserwan-Jbeil
- District: Keserwan

Population
  - Estimate: 100,000
- Time zone: UTC+2
  - Summer (DST): UTC+3
- Website: www.jounieh.gov.lb

Jounieh (Levantine Arabic: جونيه, romanized: Jūniyeh, or Juniya, جونية) is a coastal city in Keserwan District, about 16 km (10 mi) north of Beirut, Lebanon. Since 2017, it has been the capital of Keserwan-Jbeil Governorate. Jounieh is known for its seaside resorts and bustling nightlife, as well as its old stone souk, ferry port, paragliding site and gondola lift (le téléphérique), which takes passengers up the mountain to the shrine of Our Lady of Lebanon in Harissa.

Above Jounieh, and on the way to Harissa, a small hill named Bkerké (Arabic: بكركي, or Bkerki), overlooking the Jounieh bay, is the seat of the Patriarch of the Maronite Catholic Church of Lebanon. Residents of Jounieh and the surrounding towns are overwhelmingly Maronite Catholics. Maameltein is a district of Ghazir village.

== History ==
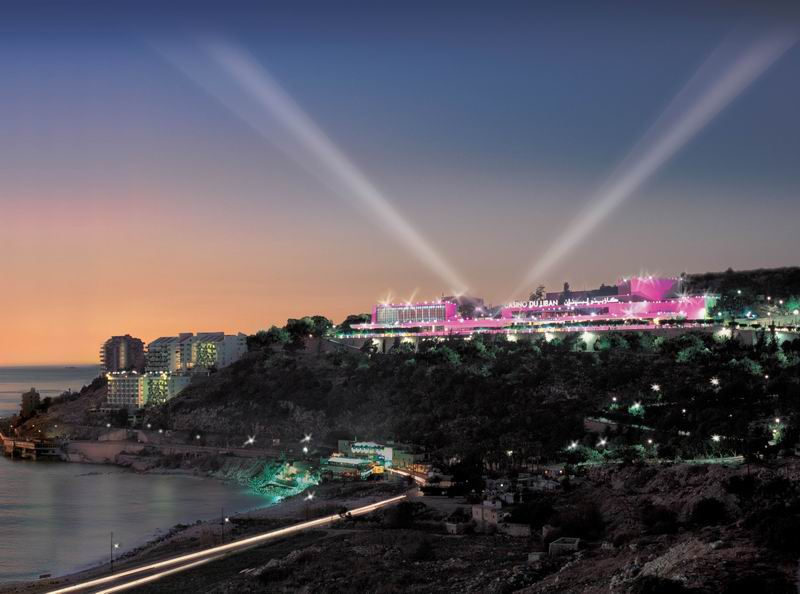
Casino du Liban

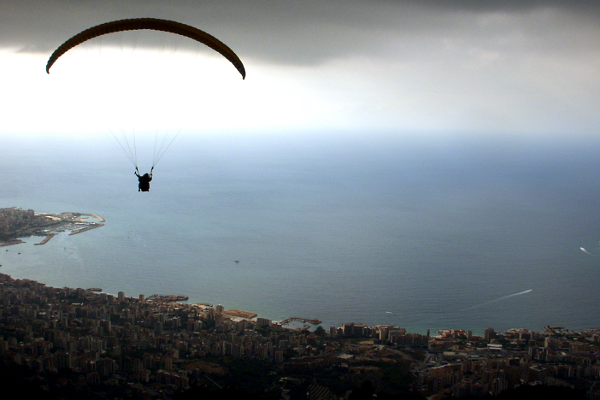
Paragliding over the Jounieh Bay

The history of Jounieh goes back to the time of the Phoenicians. The town was an important trading center along the Lebanon coastline. In those days the port was an important one during winter, as it served as a safe spot for ships sailing north to Byblos. This gave the place the name of the name of "Palaebyblus" that means 'Before Byblos”. In his geographic description the Greek historian Strabo mentions this town.

The reason few remains can be seen today is due to the fact that during the Roman and Byzantine period, many buildings and structures were built over the Phoenicians buildings and some are still visible today.

The medieval Muslim historian al-Idrisi (d. 1165) notes that Jounieh was a sea fortress whose inhabitants were Jacobite Christians. The Syrian geographer Yaqut al-Hamawi (d. 1226) called it a dependency of Tripoli.

In the sixth part of The Introduction to Jounieh in the Mid Nineteenth Century, Professor Butrus Al-Boustani said: “Jounieh is a place on the Keserwan coast which has warehouses, stores, and a dye house. Ships and boats bring supplies and its grain trade is very popular. Thus a district of the following villages: Sarba, Ghadir, and Harat Sakhr was named for it. Its total population is 2,500. Jounieh itself is not a residential area but mainly a commercial district whose workers come from neighboring towns.”

=== Ottoman Empire ===
Jounieh was connected with neighboring areas by roads built for carriages. So it was connected with Bkerké and beyond it during the rule of Dawud Basha, the ruler of Mount Lebanon. It was connected to Ghazir between 1867 and 1868 despite the objection of Ghazir's residents. Another road connected Jounieh to the Beirut Bridge during the rule of Rustum Basha. To the north it was connected by a carriage's road until Batroun during the rule of Wasa Basha (1883–1892). In 1892, Jounieh was connected to Beirut via a railroad that had stations between the two locations, three of which in Jounieh and its environs: Sarba, Jounieh, and Mu’amilitain at the end of the line, which facilitated the transportation of goods and passengers from and to the Governorate of Beirut. In 1876, the number of shops exceeded 300, five silk factories, three rest houses, a mill, three juice factories, an artificial ice factory, a bank known by its owner's name "Bank Baghos", and a group of small sailboat construction sites.

In 1906, according to the Guide to Lebanon by Ibrahim Beik Al-Soud, the population of Jounieh was 2,400, and it had a silk factory owned by the Nasras, a silkworms choker owned by Moussa de Franj, a silk factory owned by the heirs of Rizkallah and Abdul Ahad Khadra which had 190 wheels and produced 10,000 cocoons, 330 domestic animals, and owned 80 carriages. According to the records of the Keserwan Governorate, the town of Ghadir, in 1914, had 433 corporations and its population was 1,263. The town of Sarba had 213 commercial institutions and its population was 1,714. In Harat Sakhr, there were 165 corporations and its population was 808. In Sahil ‘Alma, there were 21 corporations its population reached 187. Jounieh had seen noticeable prosperity after France and the Maronite Patriarchy supported the opening a port for commercial ships which became (with the Al-Nabi Younes Port on the Chouf Coast) the official port of Mount Lebanon.

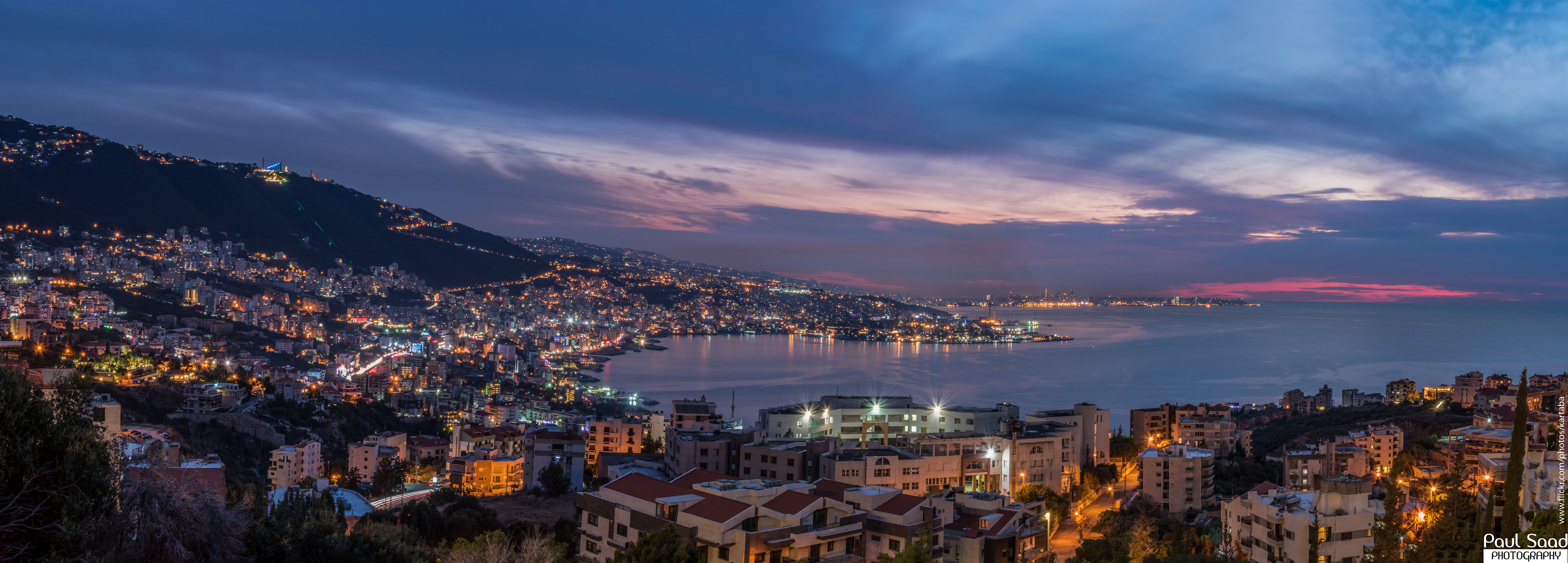
Jounieh Bay at sunset 2016

In 1913 and during the Mandate era, Jounieh suffered economic decline and recession as the French administration moved part of Jounieh’s administrative role to the Capital, Beirut. Also Jounieh came out of the First World War weakened by famine and economic stagnation. So several of its inhabitants were forced to move to the capital or to immigrate, and Jounieh lost most of its expertise. Its social and population development stopped, and its economic development weakened. The 1932 statistics showed 1,286 housed in Jounieh: 371 in Sarba, 434 in Ghadir, 350 houses in Harat Sakhr, and 131 in Sahil ‘Alma. This affected the building industry and records in the town hall showed very limited number of permits given from 1922-1940. The only active sectors in that period were schools, small crafts, and planting of citrus trees, sugar cane, and vegetables. This situation stayed the same until the rule of President Fuad Chehab who outfitted the city with all that it needed to become modern. Jounieh then awakened from its slumber with projects for roads, lighting, modern planning, a stadium, a tourist port, a government house, and infrastructure. The talk became of “Monte Carlo of the East” and Jounieh stood out as a bride of the Lebanese coast. In 1959, it started to attract banks, the first which were the Lebanese Commerce Bank and the Lebanese Federal Bank. By 1975 the number of banks reached six and today there are 38 banks in addition to the Lebanese Central Bank which was established in 1879.

=== Modern history ===
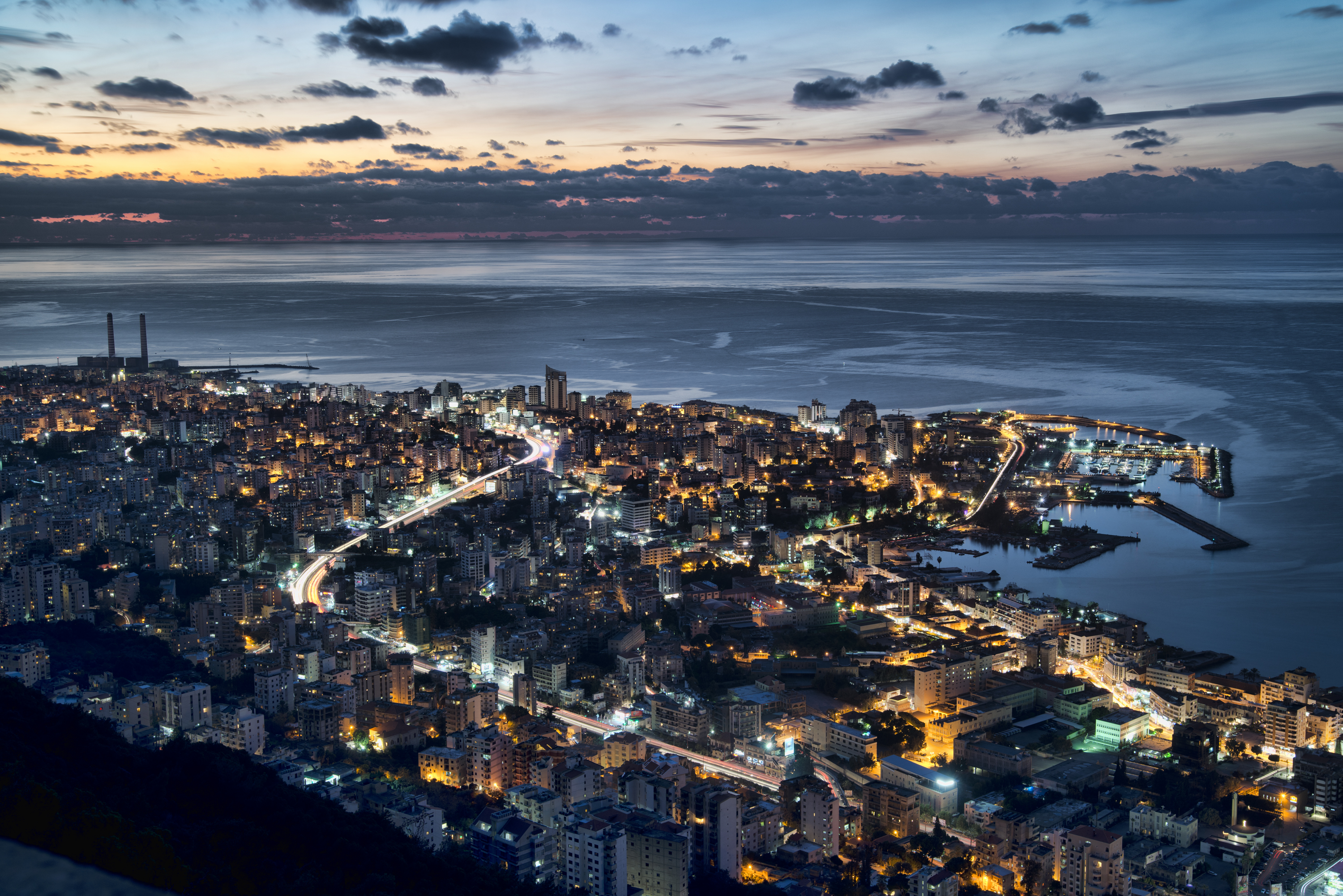
View from Harissa, Lebanon

The area also witnessed an increase in the price of land from an average of seven to nine Lebanese pounds per square meter between 1950 and 1960 to an average of 25 to 35 Lebanese pounds in 1965.

The construction sector developed slowly starting from Sarba to Harat Sakhr, and finally the coast of ‘Alma. The buildings also started expanding around the city as the agricultural sector contracted and became confined to the coasts of Kaslik and some orchards in Ghadir, Harat Sakhr and the coast of ‘Alma. In the beginning of the seventies, Jounieh was transformed to a major and complete tourist center with the tourist network around it and on its edges including: Casino du Liban, the cable cars, the Harisa Church, the caverns in Jeita, restaurants, hotels, nightclubs, and the port.

==== Lebanese Civil War ====
With the war of 1975, and the division of Beirut into East and West parts and the escalation of the violence, many people fled to safe areas and were organizing their lives in accordance with the new realities.

From 1980 to 1990, Jounieh witnessed a massive migration as a large number of the Beirut traders moved to its markets. Buildings took over its green spaces, and the tourist complexes took over its shores. So its features changed randomly though it benefited from the use of the tourist port for commerce.

During the Civil War the ferry making the 120 mile journey from Jounieh to Larnaca was the only way to travel in and out of Lebanon for those living in the areas controlled by Christian militias. Over the fourteen years from 1975 an estimated 990,000 Lebanese left the country, up to 40% of the population. During the 1989 fighting between General Aoun and the Lebanese Forces 10,000 civilians from Beirut arrived in Cyprus over a six-week period. On 24 February 1990 the ferry was attacked by an unidentified naval patrol boat. One passenger was killed and seventeen wounded. In 1997 a catamaran was operating between Larnaca and Jounieh. A return ticket for the four-hour journey cost US$100. At the time the average monthly income in Lebanon was US$132.

==== Post Civil War ====
On 18 June 1991 six people were killed and 30 wounded after an explosion at a Lebanese Forces ammunition dump.

On 7 May 2005, a car bomb exploded between the Christian Sawt al Mahaba radio station and the Mar Yuhanna Church in Jounieh. The radio station was destroyed and the church suffered major damage. Twenty-two people were wounded.

Today, close to 100,000 people reside in Jounieh. Those who live in its suburbs exceed that number. By the middle of the century, it is predicted that Jounieh will become a suburb of Beirut in a coastal line that forms one city that expands the length of the coastal road at a time when the inhabitants of Lebanon will reach six million plus around the year 2025. The population of Jounieh is majority Maronite.

== Demographics ==
Religion in Jounieh (2014)
Religion	Percent
Christian	97.71%
Others	2.29%

In 2014, Christians made up 97.71% of registered voters in Jounieh. 71.19% of the voters were Maronite Catholics, 8.82% were Greek Catholics, 6.03% were Armenian Orthodox and 5.40% were Greek Orthodox.

== International relations ==
Jounieh is twinned with:

- Monaco
- Gustavia, Saint Barthelemy, France
- Rio de Janeiro, Brazil

== Climate ==
Jounieh has a hot-summer Mediterranean climate (Köppen climate classification Csa). In winter there is much more rainfall than in summer. The average annual temperature in Jounieh is 20.9 °C (69.6 °F). About 873 mm (34.37 in) of precipitation falls annually.

Climate data for Jounieh
Month	Jan	Feb	Mar	Apr	May	Jun	Jul	Aug	Sep	Oct	Nov	Dec	Year
Mean daily maximum °C (°F)	14.6 (58.3)	15.6 (60.1)	18.1 (64.6)	21.1 (70.0)	24.9 (76.8)	28.0 (82.4)	30.2 (86.4)	30.4 (86.7)	28.8 (83.8)	25.9 (78.6)	21.3 (70.3)	16.8 (62.2)	23.0 (73.4)
Daily mean °C (°F)	10.9 (51.6)	11.8 (53.2)	14.2 (57.6)	17.2 (63.0)	21.0 (69.8)	24.1 (75.4)	26.1 (79.0)	26.3 (79.3)	24.7 (76.5)	21.8 (71.2)	17.0 (62.6)	12.9 (55.2)	19.0 (66.2)
Mean daily minimum °C (°F)	7.3 (45.1)	7.9 (46.2)	9.8 (49.6)	12.4 (54.3)	16.1 (61.0)	19.4 (66.9)	21.6 (70.9)	22.1 (71.8)	20.6 (69.1)	17.7 (63.9)	13.0 (55.4)	9.3 (48.7)	14.8 (58.6)
Average precipitation mm (inches)	147 (5.8)	143 (5.6)	106 (4.2)	48 (1.9)	19 (0.7)	3 (0.1)	1 (0.0)	1 (0.0)	8 (0.3)	33 (1.3)	80 (3.1)	137 (5.4)	726 (28.4)
Average rainy days	10	8	7	4	3	1	0	0	1	4	6	8	52

== Tourism ==
- Paragliding

Paragliding site in Ghosta, three minutes from Harissa. Since 1992, paragliding above Jounieh is considered one of the best outdoor activities in Lebanon.

- Jounieh International Festival

Every summer, Jounieh International Festival hosts national and international icons, like Mika, Jessie J, Imagine Dragons, Jason Derulo and many others.

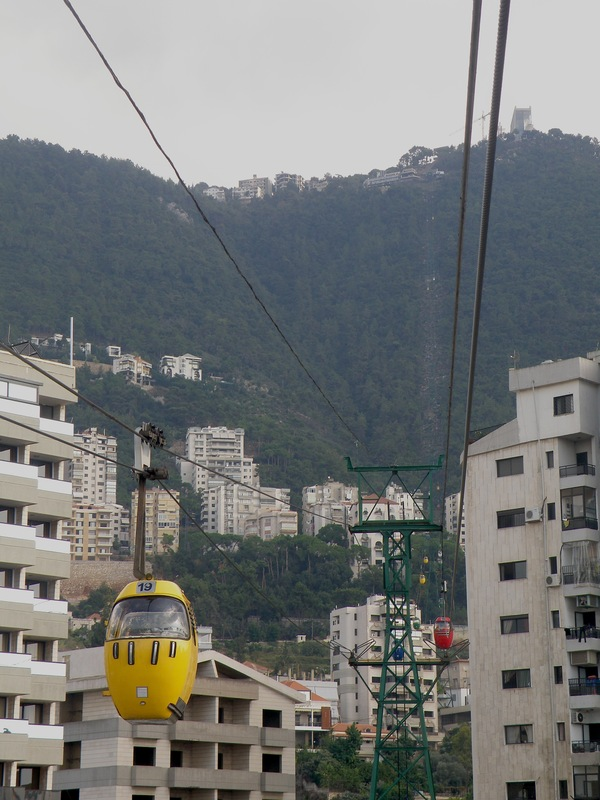
Téléphérique (Jounieh) taking visitors to Harissa

- Casino du Liban

Casino du Liban offers gaming and shows and is located in the northern part of Jounieh, it is also the biggest one in the Middle East.

- Lebanese Heritage Museum

Lebanese Heritage Museum displays items related to the culture and history of Lebanon.

- Téléphérique

The téléphérique is a gondola lift that operates between Jounieh and Harissa. It offers the passengers beautiful panoramic views of the bay of Jounieh and the coast all the way to Beirut. (See Téléphérique de Jounieh page)

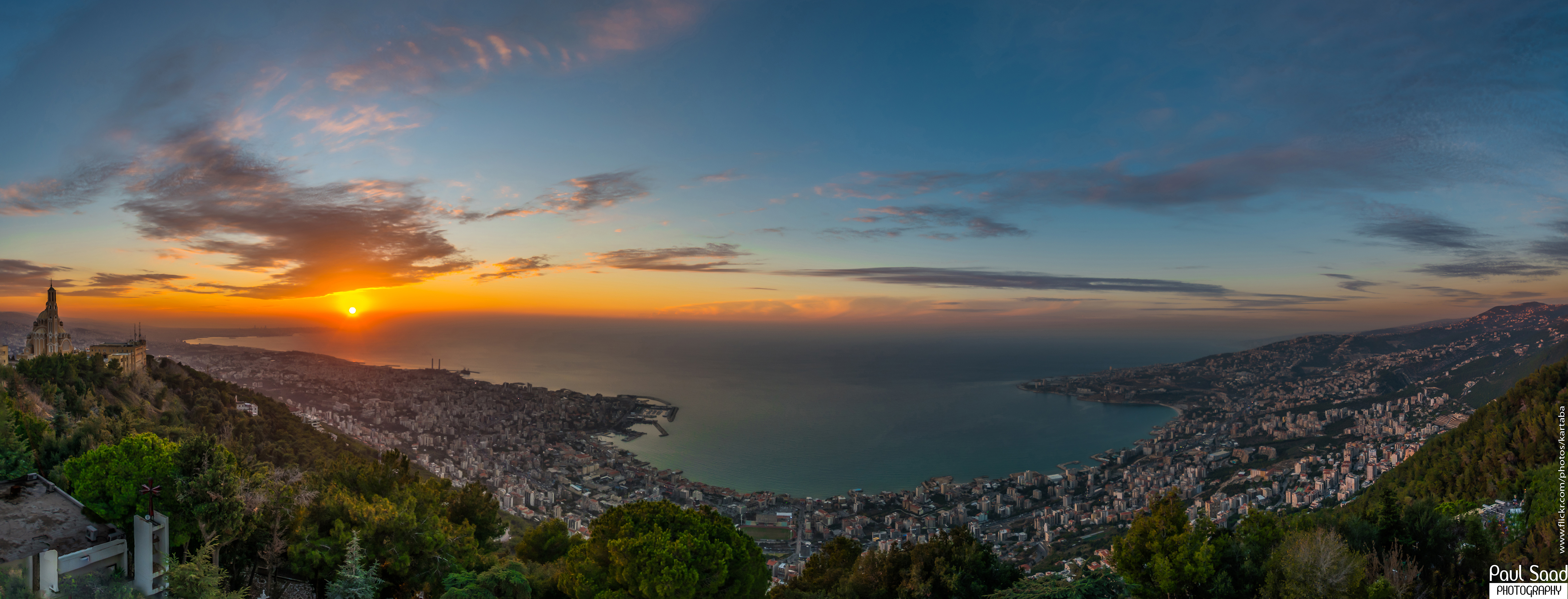
Jounieh Bay From Harissa

== Bibliography ==
- Strange, G. le (1890). Palestine Under the Moslems: A Description of Syria and the Holy Land from A.D. 650 to 1500. Committee of the Palestine Exploration Fund.

== See also ==
- Tourism in Lebanon
- Jounieh Municipal Stadium
