= Yenikent, Eskişehir =

Yenikent
- Neighbourhood
- Location in Turkey Yenikent (Turkey Central Anatolia)
- Coordinates: 39°23′48″N 31°49′14″E
- Country: Turkey
- Province: Eskişehir
- District: Günyüzü
- Population (2022): 357
- Time zone: UTC+3 (TRT)
- Postal code: 26630
- Area code: 0222

Yenikent is a neighbourhood in the municipality and district of Günyüzü, Eskişehir Province in Turkey. The population of Yenikent has decreased from 472 in 2007 to 357 in 2022.
