= Pierre Chami =

Pierre Chami SMSP
- Archeparch of Bosra and Hauran
- Native name: بيير شامى
- Church: Melkite Greek Catholic Church
- Archdiocese: Archeparchy of Bosra and Hauran
- In office: 13 November 1943 – 19 August 1967
- Predecessor: Nicolas Cadi
- Successor: Nicolas Naaman

Orders
- Ordination: 29 June 1922
- Consecration: 22 October 1944 by Cyril IX Moghabghab

Personal details
- Born: 17 December 1890 Joun, Beirut Sanjak, Beirut vilayet, Ottoman Empire
- Died: 19 August 1967 (aged 76)

Pierre Chami, SMSP (17 December 1890 in Joun in Sidon, Lebanon - 19 August 1967) was an archbishop of the Melkite Greek Catholic Archeparchy of Bosra and Hauran in Syria.

== Life ==
Pierre Chami was ordained to the priesthood on June 29, 1922, and became Chaplain of the Paulist Melkites. On 13 November 1943 he was appointed successor of Nicolas Cadi as Archbishop of Bosra and Hauran and ordained bishop on October 24, 1944. Chami participated in the first and fourth sessions of the Second Vatican Council (1962–1965). His successor Nicolas Naaman, SMSP was appointed after his death in 1967.
