= Nicolas Naaman =

Nicolas Naaman S.M.S.P.
- Archeparch of Bosra and Hauran
- Native name: نيكولا نعمان
- Church: Melkite Greek Catholic Church
- Archdiocese: Archeparchy of Bosra-Hauran
- In office: 23 August 1967 – 20 August 1982
- Predecessor: Pierre Chami
- Successor: Boulos Nassif Borkhoche

Orders
- Ordination: 15 August 1937
- Consecration: 8 October 1967 by Mikhayl Assaf

Personal details
- Born: 22 June 1911 Damascus, Syria vilayet, Ottoman Empire
- Died: 22 June 1982 (aged 71)

Nicolas Naaman, S.M.S.P. (22 June 1911, Damascus, Syria – 20 August 1982) was an archbishop of the Melkite Greek Catholic Archeparchy of Bosra and Hauran in Syria.

== Life ==
Nicolas Naaman was ordained priest on 15 August 1937, and was a member of the Missionary Society of Saint Paul (SMSP). He received his appointment as Archbishop of Bosra and Hauran on 23 August 1967. Archbishop Mikhayl Assaf of the Melkite Greek Catholic Archeparchy of Petra and Philadelphia in Amman(Jordan) consecrated him bishop on 8 October 1967, and his co-consecrators were Archbishop Paul Achkar and Archbishop Joseph Tawil. Naaman was by over 14 years Archbishop and co-consecrator of Habib Bacha, and was succeeded by Archbishop Boulos Nassif Borkhoche.

== Ceremony ==
The Lebanese journalist and editor Naji Naaman founded in 2007, on the occasion of the 25th anniversary of the death of Nicolas Naaman, the "Archbishop Nicolas Naaman Prize for human virtues".
