= Germia =

Town in Galatia, Central Anatolia

Coordinates: 39°20′N 31°50′E

Germia was a town and Byzantine pilgrimage site in the late Roman province of Galatia Secunda in Central Anatolia. The town's name is of Indo-European origin and reflects the presence of thermal springs nearby.

== History ==
From the time of Justinian I (527–565) Germia became known as Myriangeloi (Myriads of Angels) because of its celebrated shrine of Michael the Archangel and the Holy Angels. The fame of the site begun when a citizen of the nearby town of Goeleon healed the consul Stoudios with water taken from one of Germia's thermal springs in the fifth century. This consul then went on pilgrimage to Germia and built a church for Michael the Archangel as well as hospitals and old people's homes. Later, Justinian went in fulfilment of a vow to this town and bathed here. The saint Theodore of Sykeon came often to the town which was also the place of his most famous miracle, the exorcising evil spirits from some of Germia's inhabitants. A priest from the church of St. Sergius participated in the Second Council of Nicaea in 787 and the town survived the various invasions throughout the middle Byzantine period.

The ruins of the Byzantine shrine are located in the village of Gümüşkonak, known as Yörme until 1984, 8 km south of Günyüzü in Eskişehir Province, Turkey, as are the remains of necropoleis, baths and of an inn that Justinian built.

== Episcopal see ==
In the 6th century, the geographer Hierocles mentioned Germia as a bishopric. By about 650 it was an autonomous archdiocese, a status it maintained in the 9th century and also under the emperors Leo the Wise (886–912), Constantine Porphyrogenitus (913–959), and Alexius I Comnenus (1081–1118). It had become an autocephalous metropolitan see in the time of Michael VIII Palaeologus (1259–1282), Andronicus II (1282–1328) and Andronicus III (1328–1341), but disappeared soon after.

It is now in the Catholic Church's list of titular sees.
