= Ibrahim al-Khalil Convent =

Melkite convent in Syria

The Convent of Ibrahim Al Khalil
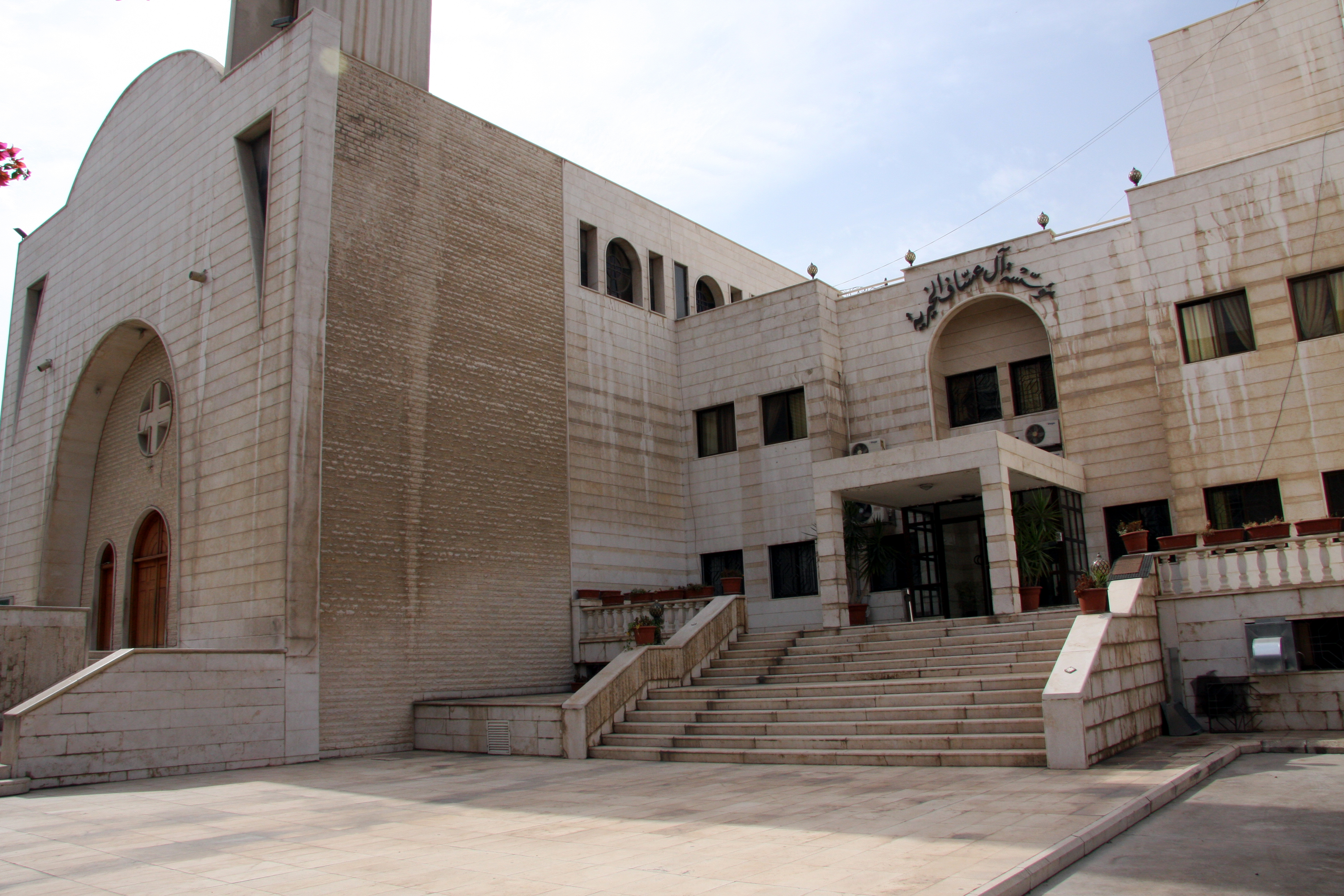
- The Convent of Ibrahim Al Khalil
- 33.4878°N 36.3444°E
- Location: Damascus, Kashkul
- Country: Syria
- Denomination: Melkite Greek Catholic

History
- Status: Active
- Founded: 1990

Architecture
- Construction cost: USD$ 2.1 million

Specifications
- Capacity: 2000

Clergy
- Bishop: Taher Yousef
- Dean: Soeur Malake Arbach

The Convent of Ibrahim Al Khalil (Arabic: دير إبراهيم الخليل) is a Melkite Greek Catholic convent located in Kashkul Jaraman, eight kilometres (5 mi) east of Damascus, Syria. The convent contains a church, health center, dormitory, computer lab, and child care facility.

== History ==
The convent was initiated by Al Assaf family in the 1990s. With the support of the patriarchate in Damascus and many Christian families the convent was extended and started offering various services free of charge. After the war in Iraq in 2003, and under the leadership of Soeur Malake Arbach, the convent served a big number Iraqi refugees. The center offered free meals and health care for thousands of people

== Health center ==
The Charity Health Center of the convent is a medical center with eight clinics of various specializations and a pharmacy. The center offer health care and medications free of charge for the general public regardless of religion, ethnicity, or nationality. Sixty-two doctors volunteer to rotate on the clinics of the Health Center. It received support from UNHCR and other organizations. With their support the center was able to acquire modern medical equipment which are not available in the poor suburb of Damascus.

== Dormitory ==
The dormitory contains 50 rooms. It is designated for students and convent visitors.

== Kindercare ==
The kinder care is child care facility consisting of five class rooms, three shared rooms, and three administrative rooms. The facility has a capacity of 80 aged between three and seven years of age.
