= Nicolas Antiba =

Syrian archbishop

Nicolas Antiba, B.A.
- Patriarchal Vicar of Damascus
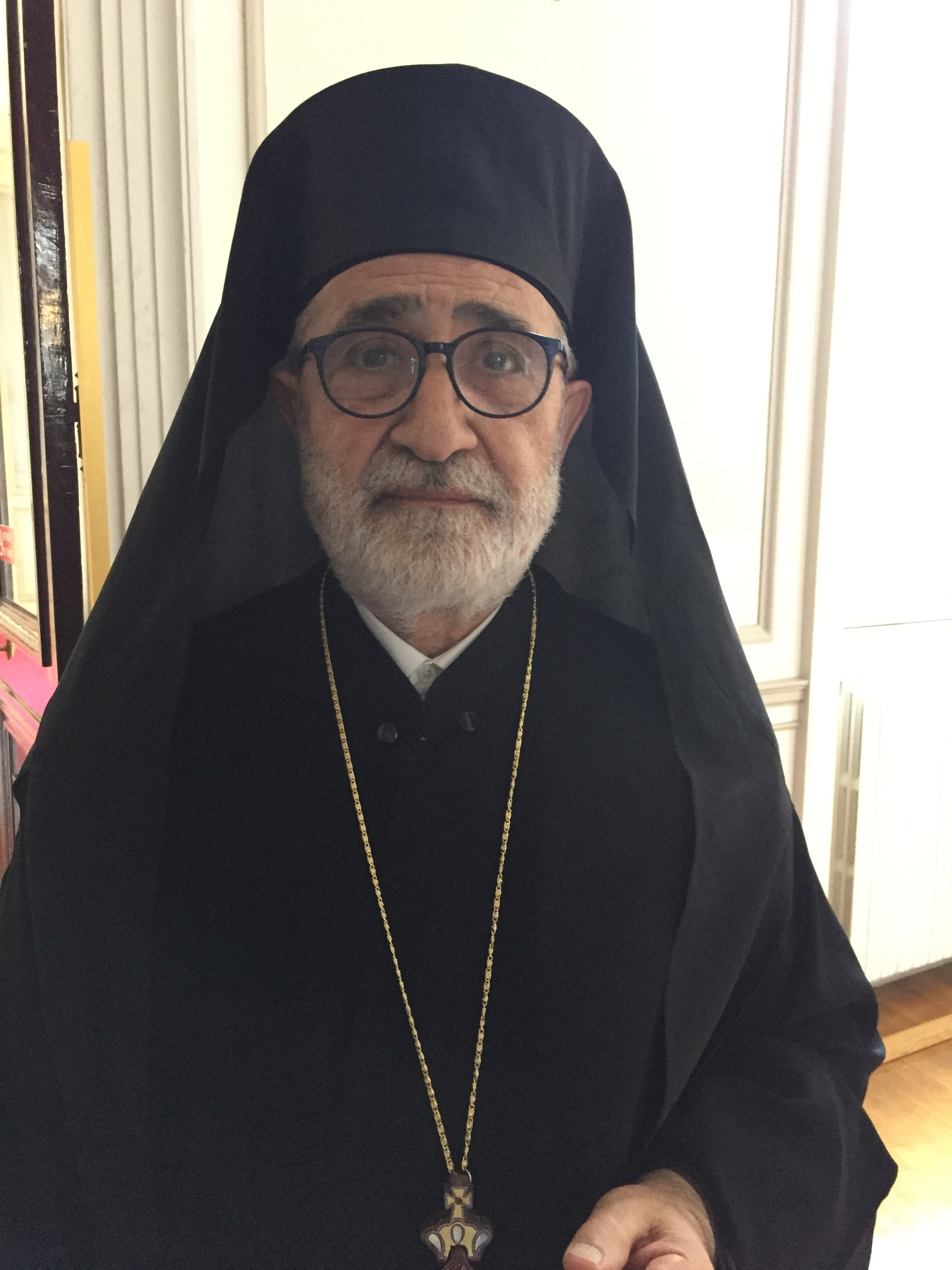
- Church: Melkite Greek Catholic
- Diocese: Melkite Greek Catholic Archeparchy of Damascus
- See: Damascus
- Elected: 22 Jun 2012
- Appointed: February 9, 2018 (Patriarchal Vicar)
- Installed: March 3, 2018
- Predecessor: Youssef Absi
- Previous post: Archbishop of the Melkite Greek Catholic Archeparchy of Bosra and Hauran (2012-2018); Superior General of Ordre Basilian Alepppian, (Melkite Greek Catholic) (1989-1995)

Orders
- Ordination: September 19, 1971
- Consecration: August 25, 2013 by Patriarch Grégoire III Laham, B.S., Boulos Nassif Borkhoche, S.M.S.P., Georges Kahhalé Zouhaïraty

Personal details
- Born: Nicolas Antiba; December 25, 1945 (age 80) Aleppo, Syria
- Denomination: Melkite Catholic
- Residence: Damascus, Syria

Nicolas Antiba B.A. (born 25 December 1945 in Aleppo, Syria) is a Syrian archbishop of Melkite Greek Catholic Church. He is the current Patriarchal Vicar of Damascus, Syria.

== Life ==
Nicolas Antiba professed his initial vows to the Basilian Aleppian Order on 23 March 1964. He pursued philosophical and theological studies at the Pontifical Gregorian University in Rome beginning in 1967, and obtained a licentiate. Antiba was ordained as a priest on 19 September 1971 and spent the next seven years studying Semitic languages at the Pontifical Biblical Institute, culminating in a master's degree in scripture.

Antiba's pastoral assignments began in 1978 in the United States with his appointment as the priest of the Parish of Saint Ann in West Paterson, New Jersey. In 1989, he was elevated to the position of archimandrite with his election as superior general of the Basilian Aleppian Order. In 1995, Antiba resigned his position with the Basilian Aleppian Order and was appointed by the Congregation for the Oriental Churches as its apostolic visitor to the congregation of Basilian Aleppian Sisters. A year later, upon the request of Maximos V Hakim, he moved to the patriarch's seminary of Saint Anne in Rabweh, Lebanon to "provide spiritual leadership and be in charge of the pastoral year".

In 2000, Gregory III Laham appointed Antiba as chancellor of the Melkite Greek Catholic Patriarchate in Rabweh. Two years later, Gregory III elevated Antiba to the rank of exarch and appointed him parish priest of Saint-Julien-le-Pauvre in Paris.

The synod of the Melkite Greek Catholic Church elected him on 22 June 2012 to the Archeparchy of Bosra and Hauran. This election was confirmed on 2 May 2013 by Pope Francis. Melkite Patriarch Gregory III Laham ordained him as bishop on 25 August 2013. His co-consecrators were his predecessor Boulos Nassif Borkhoche and the apostolic exarch in Venezuela, Georges Kahhalé Zouhaïraty.

Antiba's studies long career have given him fluency in Arabic, English, French and Italian. He also has a working knowledge of German, Spanish, Latin, Greek, Hebrew and Armenian. He has taught at three universities in Lebanon, Holy Spirit University of Kaslik, Antonine University and St. Paul Institute of Philosophy and Theology, and has written articles and studies in the areas of theology, scripture, liturgy and spirituality.
