= Harissa-Daraoun =

Harissa–Daraoun حريصا–درعون
- Municipality
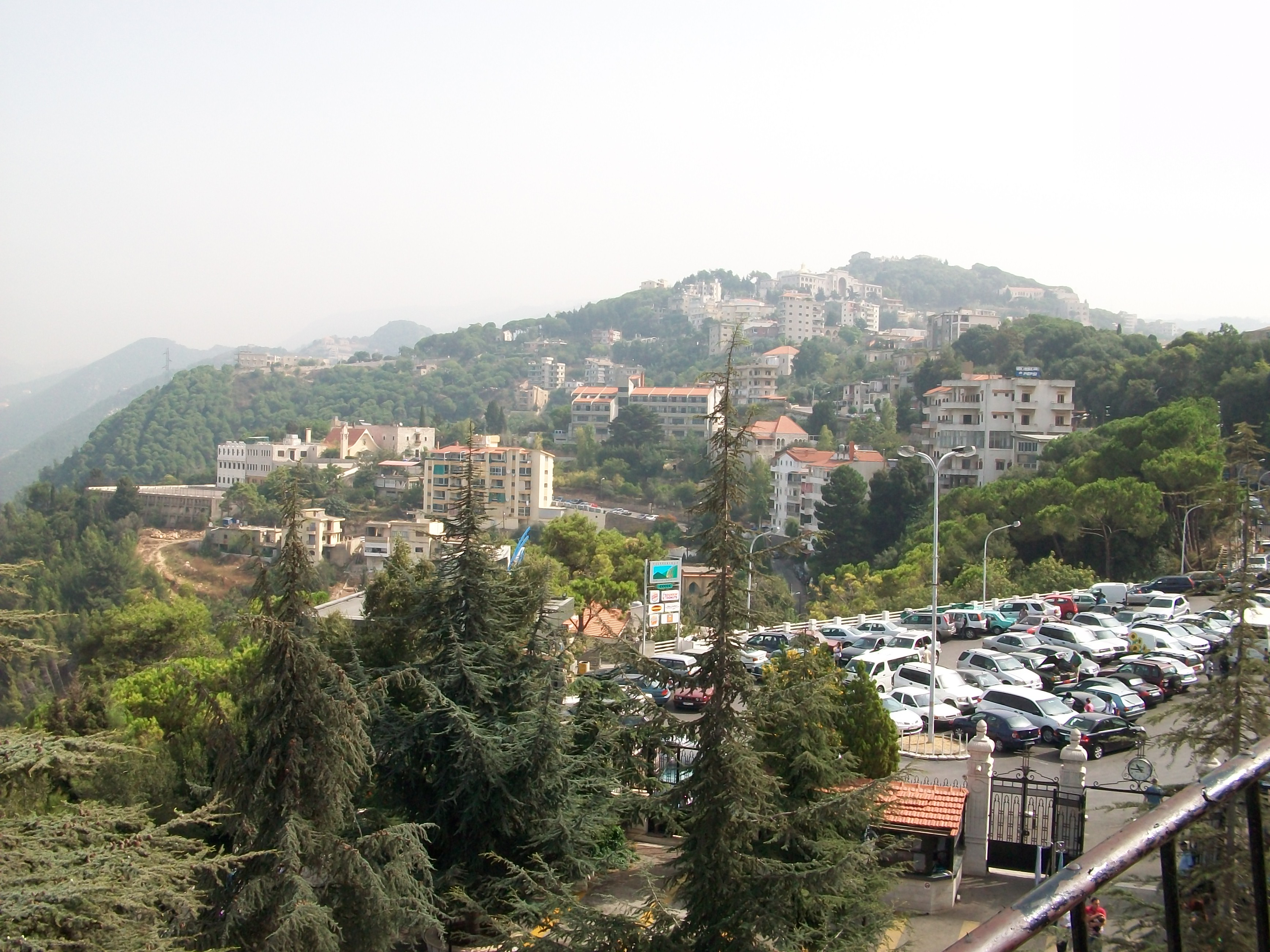
- Skyline of Harissa, 2010

- Location within Lebanon
- Coordinates: 33°58′52″N 35°39′05″E
- Country: Lebanon
- Governorate: Keserwan-Jbeil
- District: Keserwan

Area
  - Total: 4.35 km^{2} (1.68 sq mi)
- Elevation: 550 m (1,800 ft)
- Time zone: UTC+2 (EET)
  - Summer (DST): UTC+3 (EEST)
- Dialing code: +961

Harissa-Daraoun (Arabic: حريصا–درعون, romanized: Ḥarīṣṣā-Darʿūn) is a municipality that consists of two villages, Harissa and Daraoun, in the Keserwan District of the Keserwan-Jbeil Governorate of Lebanon. The municipality mayor from 2025 is Hanady Moukawem (the youngest female mayor in the Keserwan District) The municipality is located 27 km north of Beirut. Its average elevation is 550 meters above sea level and its total land area is 435 hectares. Harissa is accessible from the coastal city of Jounieh either by road or by a nine-minute journey by a gondola lift, known as the Téléphérique. Harissa is home to an important Lebanese pilgrimage site, Our Lady of Lebanon. It attracts both pilgrims and tourists who want to enjoy views of the bay of Jounieh.

Daraoun contains three schools, one public and two private, that enrolled a total of 457 students as of 2008, while Harissa had one private school with 242 students during that same time period. There were eight companies with over five employees operating in Daraoun as of 2008, and two companies with over five employees in Harissa during that same period. Daraoun's inhabitants are predominantly Maronite Catholics, while Harissa has a mixed population of Melkite and Maronite Catholics.

== Our Lady of Lebanon ==
=== Founding ===
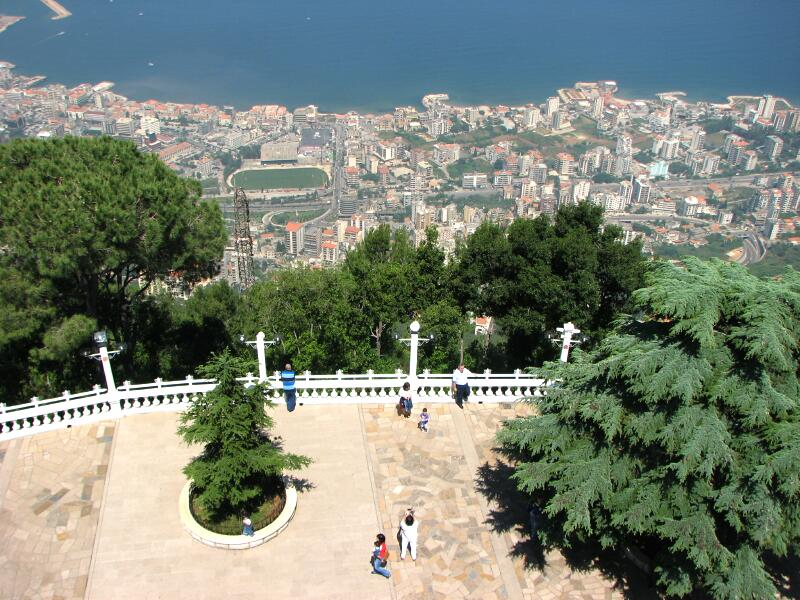
Observation deck at the Shrine overlooking the city of Jounieh

Harissa is a key Christian pilgrimage site with a shrine dedicated to Our Lady of Lebanon (Notre Dame du Liban). In 1904, Patriarch Elias Hoyek, on the 50th anniversary of the proclamation of the Dogma of the Immaculate Conception, announced the foundation of the building of Our Lady of Lebanon. The shrine belongs to the Maronite Patriarchate who entrusted its administration to the Congregation of Maronite Lebanese Missionaries since its foundation in 1904. The original church was built by Sleiman Yakoub Hokayim from Batrun. The mountain is called Harissa (after the village at the peak of the mountain). When it was inaugurated in 1908 the Patriarch dedicated Lebanon to the Virgin Mary: "Oh Mary, Queen of mountains and seas and Queen of our beloved Lebanon ...” Patriarch Hoyek designated the first Sunday in the month of May as the Feast of Our Lady of Lebanon. On this day the Maronite patriarch and all the Lebanese bishops celebrate the Divine Liturgy in the open air at the Shrine of Our Lady of Lebanon.

Our Lady of Lebanon is one of the most important shrines in the world honoring the Virgin Mary. The shrine is highlighted by a huge, 15-ton bronze statue of the Immaculate Conception, Mother of God. It is 8.5 m high, and has a diameter of five meters. The Virgin Mary stretches her hands towards Beirut. The shrine of Our Lady of Lebanon draws millions of faithful both Christians and Muslims from all over the world. The 50th jubilee in 1954 was also the hundredth anniversary of the establishment of the Immaculate Conception. During these Jubilee celebrations, Pope Pius XII sent his representative, Cardinal Angelo Roncalli to Lebanon, the later Pope John XXIII. Pope John Paul II visited Our Lady of Lebanon in 1997. The Congregation of Maronite Lebanese Missionaries, responsible for the administration, works at reinforcing relations among all local Churches, Christian communities and apostolic movements.

In 2009, the Maronite Patriarch at the time, Nasrallah Boutros Sfeir, initiated steps to turn the forest around the church into a nature reserve.

=== Religious significance ===
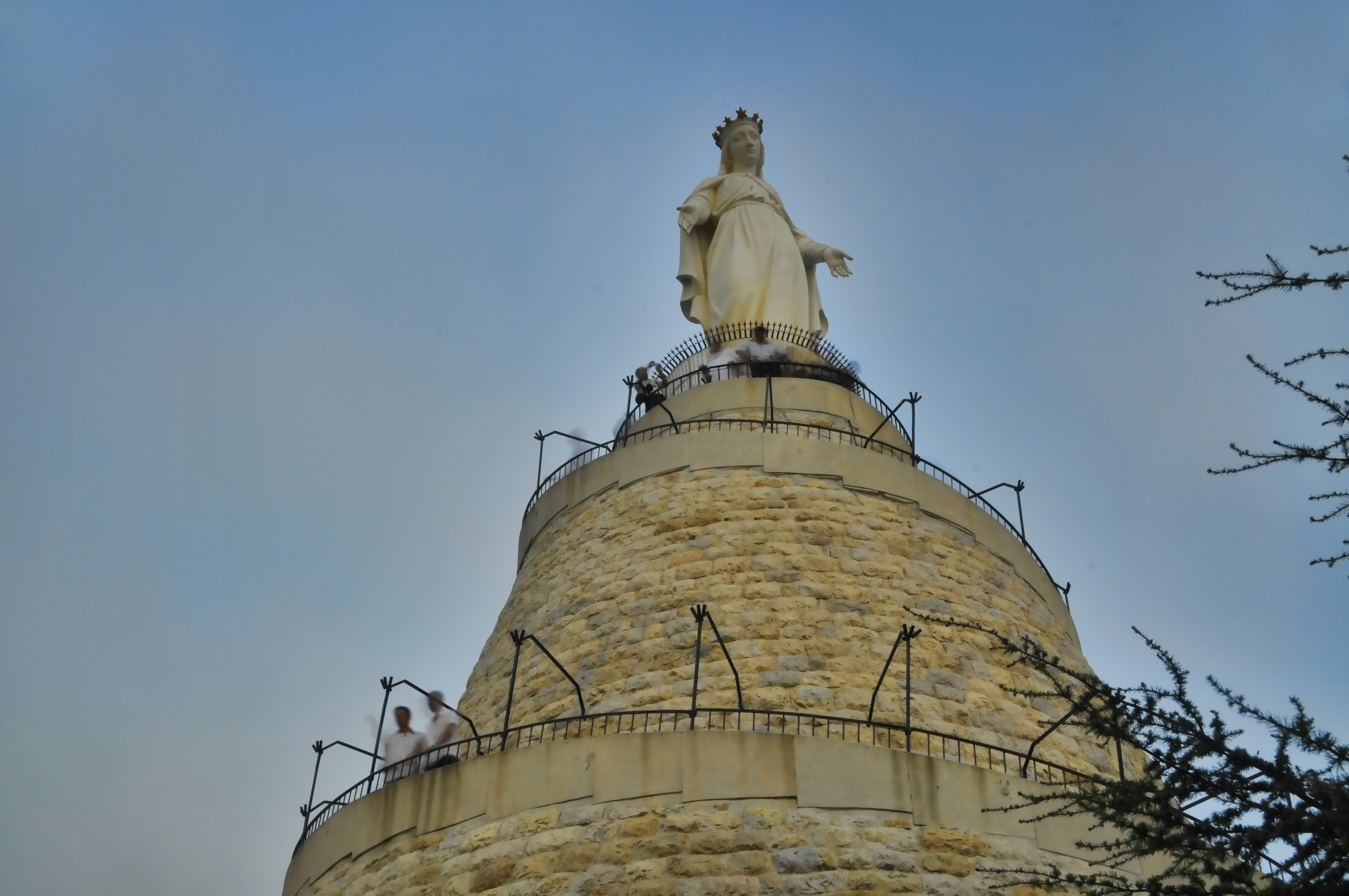
Our Lady of Lebanon Shrine

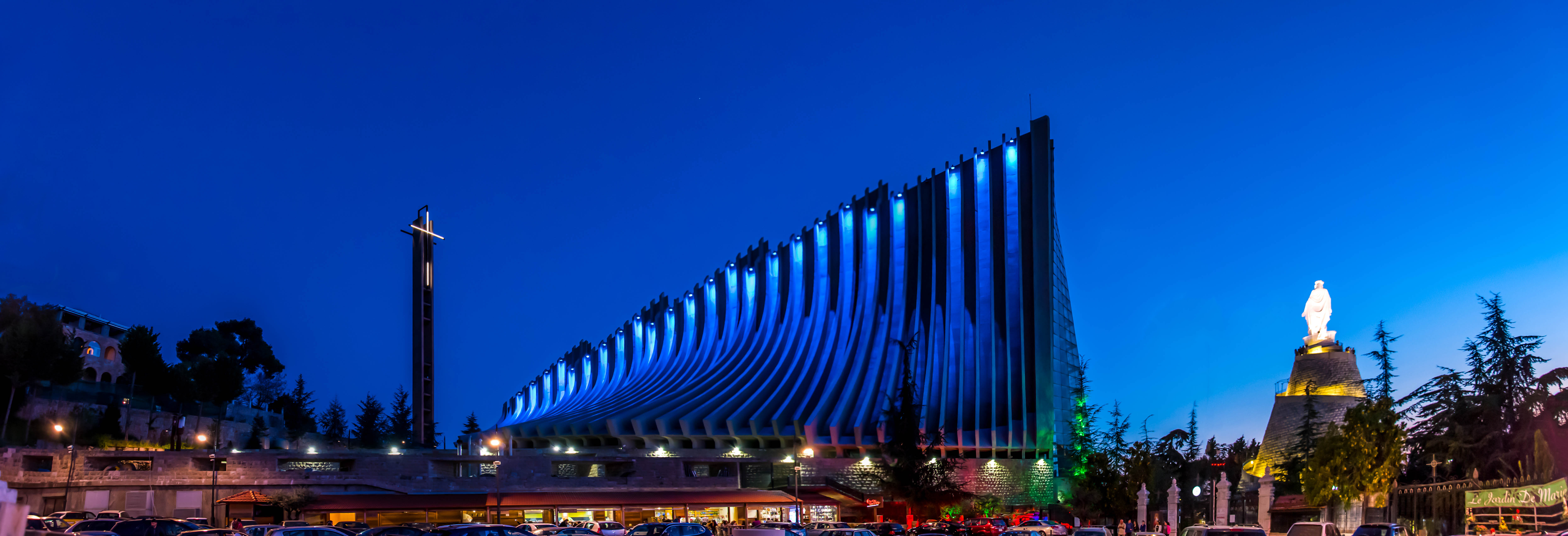
Harissa Cathedral Lebanon

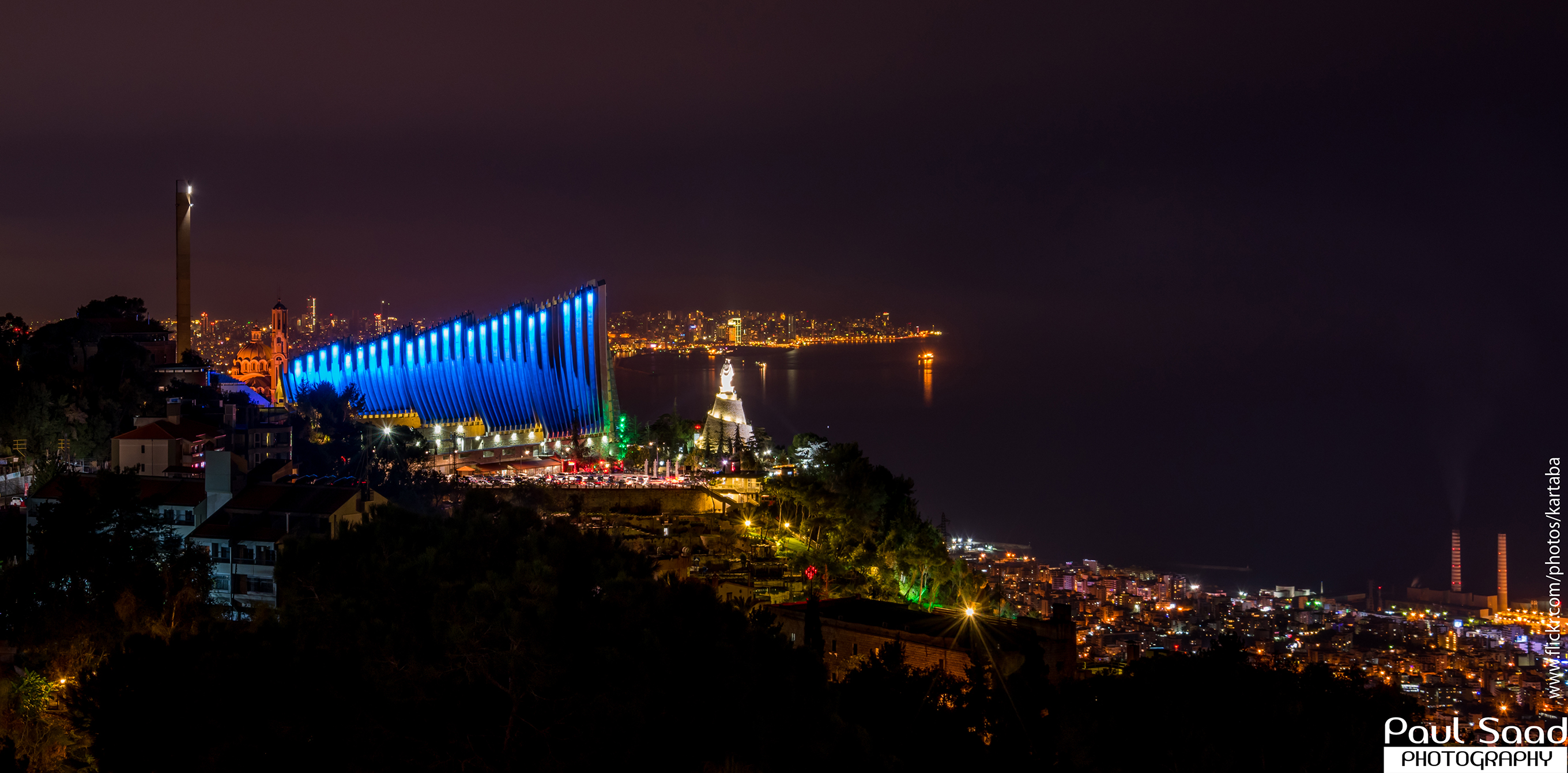
Harissa Cathedral From Bat'ha

The pilgrimage site there is a large, 15-ton bronze (and painted white) statue of Virgin Mary, known as Our Lady of Lebanon or Notre Dame du Liban, with her arms stretched. The statue was made at the end of the 19th century and inaugurated in 1908. Inside the statue's base, there is a small chapel. A huge Brutalist Maronite cathedral built of concrete and glass stands adjacent to the statue. It was completed in 1992, and has a height of 62 metres.

Among other churches of various Christian denominations in the vicinity of Harissa are the Byzantine-style, Melkite Greek Catholic basilica of St. Paul, located south of the statue and built between 1948 and 1998, the Apostolic Nunciature (Papal Embassy), as well as the residences of four patriarchs of Eastern Catholic Churches. Daroun-Harissa is known for its scenic trails (such as Darb Al Moujawkal and Darb El Sama/Darb El Qamar) offering a pilgrimage experience and panoramic views of the mountains, forests, and the Mediterranean Sea. A memorial and hiking trail dedicated to Krystel El-Adm (who tragically lost her life in the August 4, 2020 Beirut port explosion) are present in Daroun. The Krystel El Adm Foundation (KEAF), established by her family, actively supports children's education across Lebanon, including providing scholarships, school supplies, computer/IT rooms, and classroom renovations in schools like Daroun Public School.

On 10 May 1997, Pope John Paul II visited Harissa. On 15 September 2012, Pope Benedict XVI visited Harissa, including a visit to Our Lady Of Lebanon. Pope Leo XIV made his apostolic journey to Lebanon in November 2025. During his stay he resided at the Apostolic Nunciature and engaged in several key religious and diplomatic meetings.

== Twin cities ==
- La Garenne-Colombes, France
- Loreto, Marche, Italy
