= Khabab =

Town in southern Syria

Khabab خبب
- Town
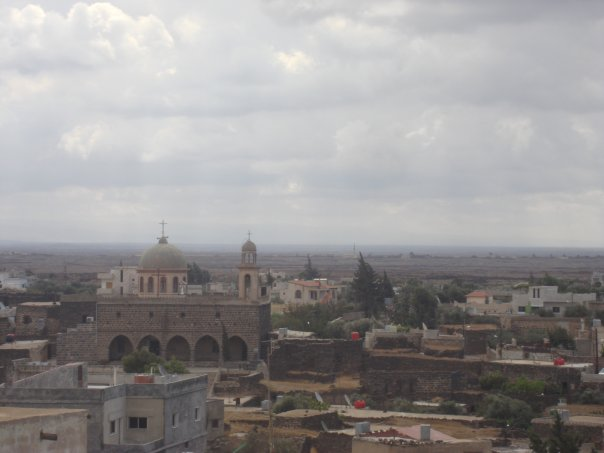
- The old town of Khabab

- Location in Syria
- Coordinates: 33°0′51.39″N 36°16′29.76″E
- Grid position: 269/271 PAL
- Country: Syria
- Governorate: Daraa
- District: Sanamayn
- Subdistrict: Sanamayn
- Elevation: 700 m (2,300 ft)

Population (2004 census)
  - Total: 3,379
- Time zone: UTC+3 (AST)

Khabab (Arabic: خبب) is a town in southern Syria, administratively part of the as-Sanamayn District in the Daraa Governorate. It is situated 700 meters (2,300 ft) above sea level, about 57 km south of Damascus, in the Hauran plain. According to the Syria Central Bureau of Statistics (CBS), Khabab had a population of 3,379 in the 2004 census. Its inhabitants are predominantly Melkite Greek Catholic Christians.

== Etymology ==
The old name of the town is Abiba, which in Aramaic and Syriac means a plain green grass.

== History ==
=== Ottoman era ===
In 1596, Khabab appeared in the Ottoman tax registers as Habab and was part of the nahiya (subdistrict) of Bani Kilab in the Hauran Sanjak. It had a Muslim population consisting of 45 households and 30 bachelors, and a Christian population consisting of 3 households and 2 bachelors. The villagers paid a fixed tax rate of 40% on wheat, barley, summer crops, goats and beehives; a total of 12,800 akçe.

In 1838, Khubab was noted as being situated "in the Luhf, north of the Lejah", and having Catholic inhabitants.

== Geography ==
=== Climate ===
The weather in Khabab is similar to that of the southern region of Syria, with a generally moderate climate. Winters are relatively cold with occasional waves of stronger chill, while summers are fairly hot.

The seasons are clearly defined. In summer, the days are hot, but the nights are pleasant, often accompanied by a dry breeze. Autumn begins with yellowing leaves and cooler weather, followed by cold winters, especially in December, January, and February. Spring starts in March, bringing milder temperatures and renewed greenery.

The average annual rainfall is about 250 mm (measured until the year 2000). Temperatures range from a minimum of around –4 °C in winter to a maximum of about 38 °C in summer, with average seasonal temperatures of 4.4 °C in winter and 30 °C in summer.

== Demographics ==
The population of Khabab is estimated at 8,000–10,000 residents, depending on the season, as many people return to the town during the summer holidays. In addition, about 40,000 people originally from Khabab live outside Syria, with large communities in France, the United States, Canada, Brazil and Australia, as well as in several Arab countries.

- Population Growth: 1.01% - The proportion: Females 51%, Males 49%.

=== Religion ===
The population of Khabab is predominantly Christian, particularly members of the Melkite Greek Catholic Church. The Archeparchy of Bosra–Hauran has its see in the town. The Cathedral of the Dormition is the main church of Khabab. Other churches include those dedicated to Saint Rita and the abandoned Saint George, as well as a nunnery of the Besançon Charity Sisters.

In 2011, the Melkite Greek Catholic Church had approximately 5,200 believers.

== Economy ==
Traditionally, the people of Khabab were farmers, as in much of southern Syria, and agriculture was once the main source of livelihood. In recent years, however, dependence on agriculture has declined significantly for several reasons:

- Reliance on rainfall: Agricultural output has always been affected by the amount of rainfall. The most important rain-fed crops are wheat, barley and lentils. In recent decades, irrigation agriculture has become more common, supporting the cultivation of vegetables such as tomatoes, watermelon, carrots, as well as fruit trees including grapes, olives and almonds.
- Shift to salaried work: Many residents are now employed in either the public or private sector, making monthly salaries the main source of income.
- Migration of youth: Younger generations have increasingly moved to major cities—especially Damascus—or emigrated to the Persian Gulf, Europe, the Americas, and Australia. As a result, many young people are no longer interested in following the traditional agricultural lifestyle of their parents and grandparents.
- Land disputes: Large tracts of land remain in dispute between the residents of Khabab and Bedouin families who settled in the area between 1910 and 1918. This ongoing issue has undermined confidence in the future of agriculture in the town.
- Diversification into other sectors: A growing number of residents now work in commerce and industry.

== Culture ==
=== Education ===
Khabab has one of the highest literacy rates in Syria, reflecting the community’s strong emphasis on education. Many residents are highly skilled and distinguished in various fields. The Archdiocese and the local monastery have played a key role in promoting education and learning, not only in Khabab but also in the surrounding villages.

The town has seven schools, including a kindergarten, two primary schools, and four schools for middle and high school education. A significant number of intellectuals and teachers from Khabab work throughout the governorate, contributing to education in both rural and urban areas.

== Public infrastructure ==
Khabab has several public facilities, including a health clinic, a hospital currently under construction, a police station, a public consumer shop, and a train station.

== Religious buildings ==
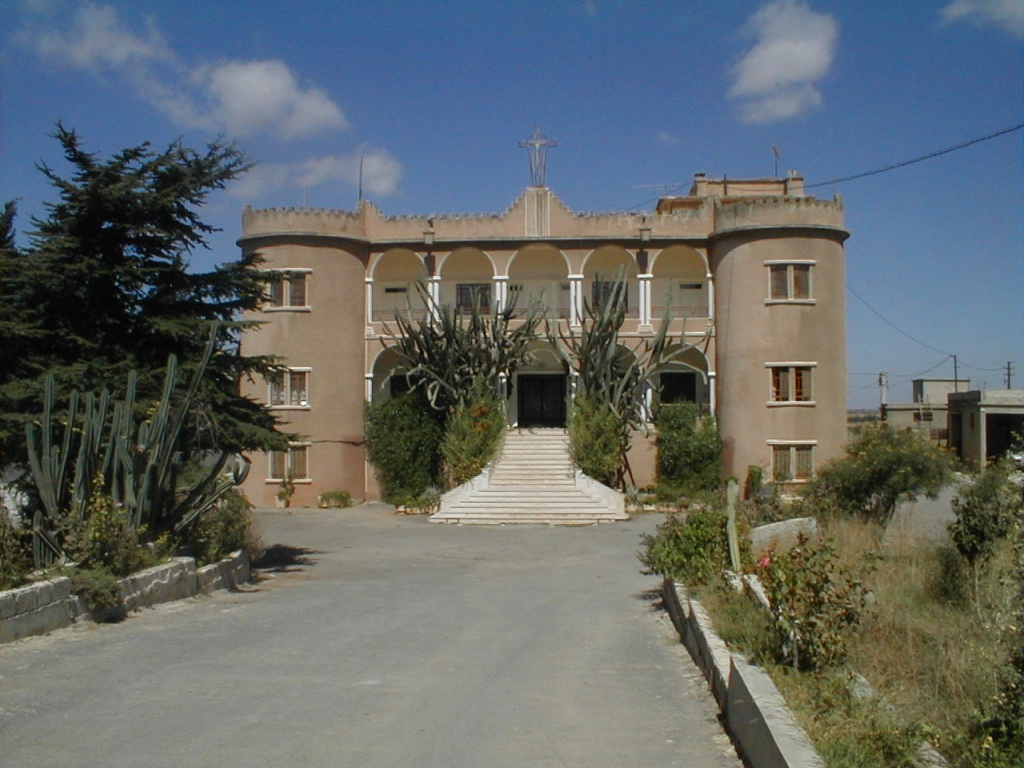
Archdiocese of Bosra and Houran

- Our Lady of the Dormition Melkite Greek Catholic Cathedral
- Basilica of St. Rita
- Monastery of the Virgin (Besançon)
- Archdiocese of Bosra, Horan and Jabal al-Arab

== See also ==
- Christians in Syria

== Bibliography ==
- Hütteroth, W.-D.; Abdulfattah, K. (1977). Historical Geography of Palestine, Transjordan and Southern Syria in the Late 16th Century. Erlanger Geographische Arbeiten, Sonderband 5. Erlangen, Germany: Vorstand der Fränkischen Geographischen Gesellschaft. ISBN 3-920405-41-2.
- Robinson, E.; Smith, E. (1841). Biblical Researches in Palestine, Mount Sinai and Arabia Petraea: A Journal of Travels in the year 1838. Vol. 3. Boston: Crocker & Brewster.

== Sources ==
- khabab.net
