= Melkite Greek Catholic Archeparchy of Damascus =

Eastern Catholic archeparchy in Syria

Coordinates: 33.5000°N 36.2833°E

Archeparchy of Damascus (Melkite Greek) Archeparchy Damascena Graecorum Melkitarum
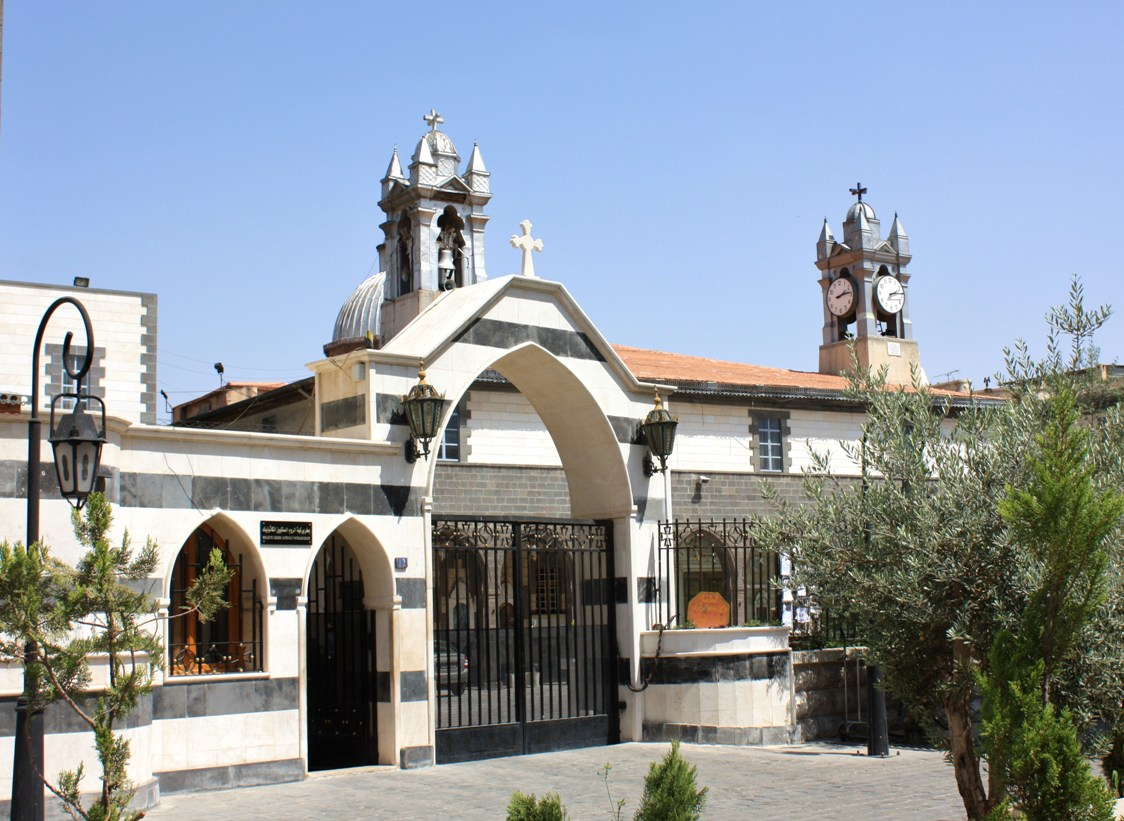

Location
- Country: Syria

Statistics
- Population: (as of 2010); 150,000
- Parishes: 20

Information
- Denomination: Melkite Greek Catholic Church
- Rite: Byzantine Rite
- Established: 3rd century
- Cathedral: Our Lady of the Dormition Cathedral

Current leadership
- Pope: Leo XIV
- Patriarch: Youssef Absi
- Patriarchal Vicar: Nicolas Antiba

Melkite Greek Catholic Archeparchy of Damascus of the Melkites (in Latin: Archeparchy Damascena Graecorum Melkitarum) is a metropolitan and patriarchal see. In 2010 there were 150,000 baptized. The current vicar of Patriarch Youssef Absi is Archbishop Nicolas Antiba.

== Territory and statistics ==
The archeparchy is headquartered in the city of Damascus, where the seat is held at the Cathedral of Our Lady of the Dormition.

The territory is divided into 20 parishes and there were 150,000 Melkite Catholics in 2010.

== History ==
The headquarters in Damascus has ancient origins (3rd century). From the 14th century, with the decline of the city of Antioch, Damascus became the seat of the Greek Orthodox patriarchs.

Following the schism within the Greek Orthodox Church of Antioch in 1724 was erected a seat of Melkite Greek Catholic Church.

Since 1838 Melkite Greek Catholic Archeparchy of Damascus is subject to the Melkite Patriarch of Antioch, who is represented by a patriarchal vicar, almost always with the dignity of bishop. Archbishop Nicolas Antiba, B.A. is the current Patriarchal Vicar of Damascus.

== See also ==
- List of Melkite Greek Catholic Patriarchs of Antioch
- Ibrahim Al-Khalil Convent
