= Our Lady of Mt. Lebanon-St. Peter Cathedral (Los Angeles) =

Maronite Catholic cathedral in the US

Our Lady of Mt. Lebanon- St. Peter Cathedral
- Our Lady of Mt. Lebanon- St. Peter Cathedral
- 34°04′20.94″N 118°22′39.46″W
- Location: 333 S. San Vicente Blvd. Los Angeles, California
- Country: United States
- Denomination: Catholic Church
- Sui iuris church: Maronite Church
- Website: www.ourladymtlebanon.com

History
- Founded: 1923

Administration
- Diocese: Eparchy of Our Lady of Lebanon of Los Angeles

Clergy
- Bishop: Most Rev. Abdallah Elias Zaidan
- Rector: Father Elias Sleiman, M.L.M.

Our Lady of Mt. Lebanon-St. Peter Cathedral is a Maronite Catholic cathedral located in Los Angeles, California, United States. It is the seat of the Eparchy of Our Lady of Lebanon of Los Angeles along with St. Raymond Cathedral in St. Louis, Missouri.

== History ==
Monsignor Joseph Daher organized Maronite Catholics into a parish in 1923 named Our Lady of Mt. Lebanon. Mass was celebrated in a house at Warren and Brooklyn Avenues that was purchased by the congregation. Father Paul Meouchi became pastor in 1926 and had a church, hall and rectory built on the property. He was elected the Maronite bishop of Tyre in 1934 before becoming Patriarch of Antioch, a Cardinal, and head of the Maronite Church.

Father John Chedid became pastor in 1956. By the 1960s a new church building was needed. On August 2, 1966, the parish decided to accept the offer of St. Peters Roman Catholic Church, on the border with Beverly Hills and Hollywood, which had been made by Cardinal James Francis McIntyre of the Archdiocese of Los Angeles. A parish hall was completed in 1969. Father Chedid was named a Chaplain of His Holiness, with the title Monsignor, in 1969, a Maronite Chorbishop in 1978 and the Auxiliary Bishop of the Eparchy of St. Maron of Brooklyn in 1980. The Eparchy of Our Lady of Lebanon of Los Angeles was created by Pope John Paul II on June 23, 1994, and Our Lady of Mt. Lebanon-St. Peter was chosen to serve as the cathedral. Bishop Chedid was appointed the bishop of the eparchy. The cathedral was damaged in a fire on January 6, 1996. It was refurbished, and at the same time the Chancery building was added.

== See also ==
- List of Catholic cathedrals in the United States
- List of cathedrals in the United States
