= John D. Faris =

American Maronite Catholic priest

The Reverend Monsignor John Denver Faris KC*HS (OESSH), KCHS (SMOCSG)
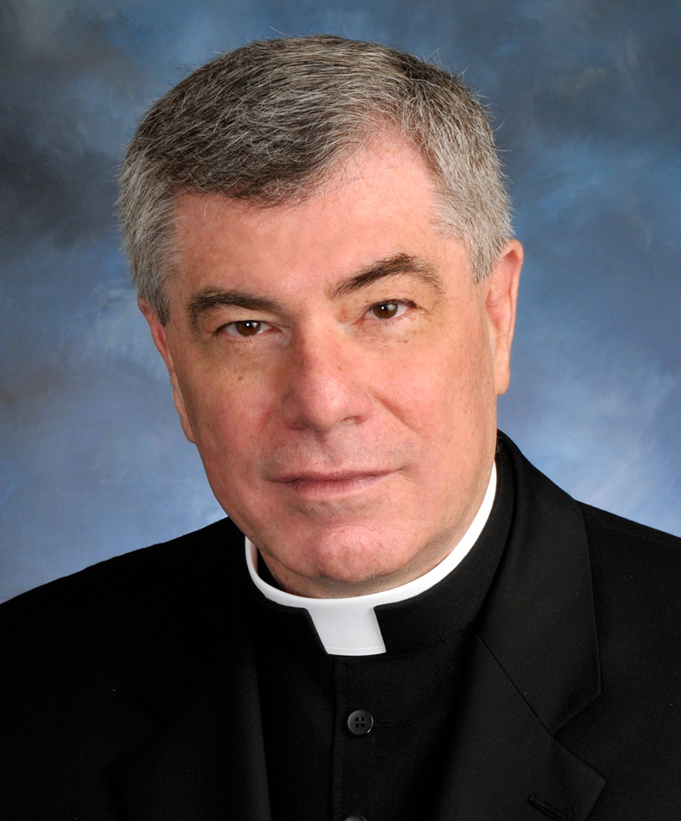
- Portrait of John Denver Faris
- Church: Maronite Church
- Diocese: Maronite Catholic Eparchy of Saint Maron of Brooklyn

Orders
- Ordination: July 17, 1976 by Francis Mansour Zayek
- Consecration: September 23, 1991 by Francis Mansour Zayek

Personal details
- Born: John Denver Faris; January 18, 1951 (age 75): Uniontown, Pennsylvania; United States
- Denomination: Catholic Church
- Parents: John M. and Goldie (née Bowlen) Faris
- Education: Sacred Heart Seminary; Pontifical North American College; Pontifical Gregorian University; Pontifical Oriental Institute

Styles of John Denver Faris
- Reference style: The Reverend Monsignor
- Spoken style: Reverend Monsignor
- Religious style: Chorbishop

John Denver Faris (born January 18, 1951) is an American Chorbishop of the Syriac Maronite Church of Antioch, serving the Maronite Catholic Eparchy of Saint Maron of Brooklyn, headquartered in Brooklyn, New York. He is a canon lawyer of the Eastern Catholic Churches, and an expert called upon for dialogue between the Catholic Church and the Eastern Christian Churches.

== Early life ==
Faris was born in 1951 in Uniontown, Pennsylvania, the son of John M. Faris and his wife, Goldie Bowlen. He attended Charles E. Boyle Elementary School, Benjamin Franklin Junior High School, and Uniontown Area High School. In 1968 he enrolled at Saint Vincent College in Latrobe, Pennsylvania. While studying there, he felt called to serve as a priest and transferred to Sacred Heart Seminary in Detroit, Michigan, where he was awarded a Bachelor of Arts degree in 1972. While residing at the Pontifical North American College in Rome, he attended the Pontifical Gregorian University, where he received a Bachelor of Sacred Theology (magna cum laude) in 1975. He then pursued studies in moral theology at the Alphonsianum.

Archbishop Francis Mansour Zayek ordained him to the priesthood on 17 July 1976 at St. George Church in Uniontown.

Faris then returned to Rome and In 1980 he was awarded a Doctor of Eastern Canon Law (magna cum laude) from the Pontifical Oriental Institute, with a dissertation on The Communion of Catholic Churches: Ecclesiology and Terminology.

== Ministry ==
After completing his doctorate, Faris was named the vice rector of the Cathedral of Our Lady of Lebanon in Brooklyn. Upon completing a year of service there, he was appointed vice chancellor of the eparchy. In 1980, he was appointed chancellor, and later protosyncellus (vicar general), of the eparchy, serving in these offices until 1996. During this period, he was named a Chaplain of His Holiness in 1988 by Pope John Paul II and later ordained a chorbishop of the Maronite Church by Zayek in 1991.

From 1996 to 2009, Faris served in a variety of positions at the Catholic Near East Welfare Association (CNEWA), finally serving as deputy secretary general. While serving with this special papal agency dedicated to assisting the Eastern Churches, Faris traveled extensively in the Middle East, India, northeastern Africa and Eastern Europe and was involved in the fund-raising initiatives of the agency.

In June 2009, Faris was appointed pastor of St. Louis Gonzaga Maronite Church in Utica, New York. He also serves as a judge on the tribunal of the eparchy.

In June 2018, Faris was appointed pastor of Saint Anthony Church in Glen Allen, Virginia, effective 1 September 2018. He was additionally appointed Editor of The Maronite Voice and all electronic media and director of the Office of Communications of the Eparchy of Saint Maron. On 23 July 2026, Faris was appointed Judicial Vicar of the Eparchy while retaining his other positions.

== Canon Law ==
Faris serves as research professor in the School of Canon Law at the Catholic University of America in Washington, D.C. Since 2020, he has lectured in the Pontifical Oriental Institute in Rome and the Institute of Oriental Canon Law of the Dharmaram Vidya Kshetram in Bangalore, India.

A member since 1984, he was elected president of the Canon Law Society of America in 1994, and later served as the chairman of the ad hoc committee responsible for the preparation of the most recent English translation of the Code of Canons of the Eastern Churches. He has also been elected the Secretary General of the Society for the Law of the Eastern Churches (1991-2000). He served as a consultor for the United States Conference of Catholic Bishops as a part of its Liaison Committee for Latin and Eastern Church Affairs (1992–96). In January 2018, Faris was appointed chair of the CLSA Eastern Churches Committee for a three-year term.

In September 2022, Faris was elected vice-president of the Society for the Law of the Eastern Churches.

Faris is also a member of the Canon Law Society of Great Britain and Ireland, the Canon Law Society of Australia and New Zealand, the Canon Law Society of India, the Eastern Canon Law Society of India. He serves on the editorial boards of various journals in his field: Eastern Canon Law, Eastern Legal Thought and Gratianus.

== Ecumenical Dialogues ==
Faris serves as a Catholic Representative on the North American Orthodox-Catholic Theological Consultation and the United States Oriental Orthodox-Roman Catholic Consultation. From 2007 - 2011, he served as a member of the Catholic Delegation on the Joint Working Group, a liaison body of the Catholic Church and the World Council of Churches. In 2019, Faris was appointed by the Council for Promoting the Unity of Christians to the Catholic Delegation of the International Joint Commission for Theological Dialogue between the Catholic Church and the Oriental Orthodox Churches.

== Equestrian Order of the Holy Sepulchre of Jerusalem ==
Faris was named a Titular Canon of the Equestrian Order of the Holy Sepulchre, with the rank of Knight Commander with Star (conferred on 23 November 2013). In September 2010, he received the Order's highest honor, the Golden Palm of Jerusalem, for his dedication to and work for the Christians of the Holy Land. He is a member of the Board of Councillors of the Eastern Lieutenancy of the Order for the United States. He is involved in recruiting new members and provides extensive lectures on the Order and the Holy Land. He has recently been serving as spiritual director for seminarians on Holy Land pilgrimages sponsored by the Eastern Lieutenancy. Despite his numerous visits and pilgrimages to the Holy Land, Faris only received the "Pilgrim's Shell" from His Beatitude Pierbattista Pizzaballa in March 2017. On the same pilgrimage he received the Franciscan Cross in recognition of his charity towards the poor in the Holy Land.

== Honors ==
In 2011, Faris was presented by the Canon Law Society of America with their Role of Law Award for his outstanding contributions to canonical science.

Faris was appointed Chaplain iure sanguinis of the Sacred Military Constantinian Order of Saint George.

== Selected bibliography ==
Books

- (Chair of CLSA Committee) Code of Canons of the Eastern Churches. Latin-English Edition—New English Translation. Washington, DC: Canon Law Society of America, 1995.
- Eastern Catholic Churches: Constitution and Governance. Brooklyn, NY: Saint Maron Publications, 1992.
- The Communion of Catholic Churches: Terminology and Ecclesiology . Brooklyn, NY: Pontifical Oriental Institute, 1985.
- In collaboration with Pospishil, V. J. The New Latin Code of Canon Law and Eastern Catholics. Brooklyn, NY: Diocese of Saint Maron, 1984.
- Canon Law and Ecumenism: To Become What We Are. Dharmaram Canonical Studies. Bengalaru: Dharmaram Vidya Kshetram, 2018.
- Co-edited with Jobe Abbass, A Practical Commentary to the Code of Canons of the Eastern Churches. Montreal: Wilson & LeFleur, 2019.
- Ascription Reconsidered: Current Norms, Contemporary Realities, and Future Possibilities. Bengaluru, India: Dharmaram Publications, 2026.

Articles

- "Canonical Issues in the Pastoral Care of Eastern Catholics." Proceedings of the 53rd Annual Convention of the Canon Law Society of America, 154–64. Washington, DC: Canon Law Society of America, 1991.
- “A Church Comes of Age: The Syro-Malankara Major Archiepiscopal Church.” Published in Commemoration Book of Syro-Malankara Catholic Conference August, 2006.
- "Code of Canons of the Eastern Churches and Temporal Goods, The." Church Finance Handbook, Editors Kevin E. McKenna, Lawrence A. Di Nardo, and Joseph W. Pokusa, 27–43. Washington, DC: Canon Law Society of America, 1999.
- "The Codification and Revision of Eastern Canon Law." Studia Canonica 17 (1983): 449–85.
- "Eastern Churches in the Western World: Roots, Growth, Future." Catholic Near East 26, no. 6 (2000): 20–25.
- "Interritual Matters in the Revised Code of Canon Law."50th International Congress of Canon Law, 821-23. Proceedings of the 50th International Congress of Canon Law: 1986.
- "An Overview of the Code of Canons of the Eastern Churches." New Commentary on the Code of Canon Law, Editors John P. Beal, James A. Coriden, and Green Thomas J., 27–44. New York: Paulist Press, 2000.
- "A Pearl Anniversary." Catholic Near East 20, no. 6 (1994): 20–25.
- "Penal Law in the Catholic Church: A Comparative Overview." Folia Canonica 2 (1999): 53–93.
- "The Reception of Baptized Non-Catholics into Full Communion." Acta Symposii Internationalis Circa Codicem Canonum Ecclesiarum Orientalium Kaslik, 24-29 Aprilis 1995., 159–77. Kaslik, Lebanon: Université Saint-Espirit, 1996.
- "Toward a Recognition of the Status of the Eastern Churches in the Catholic Communion of Churches." The Living Light 32 (1996): 50–57.
- “The Latin Church Sui Iuris.” The Jurist 62 (2002) 280–293.
- "Upon This Rock." Catholic Near East 25/6 (1999): 6-11.
- “The Synod of Bishops and Council of Hierarchs in the Code of Canons of the Eastern Churches” Studies in Church Law
- “Byzantines in Italy: A Microcosm of an Evolving Ecclesiology.” The Jurist 67 (2007) 89-108.
- "At Home Everywhere--A Reconsideration of the Territorium Proprium of the Patriarchal Churches." The Jurist 69 (2009) 5-30.
- "A Code for the 'Other Lung'" Recht. Religion en Semanleving (2012) 91-115.
- "The Particular Law of the Maronite Church with a Special Focus on Territorial Restrictions." Kanon 23 (2014) 88-108.
- "Structures for Liturgical Reform and the Code of Canons of the Eastern Churches." Questions Liturgiques 95 (2014) 128–147.
- "God and Church: Communions of One and Many." Iustitia 5:1 (June 2014) 9-22.
- "Exercise of Roman Primacy and the Communion of Churches." In Il CCEO--Strumento per il future delle Chiese orientali cattolici. Atti del Simposio di Roma, 22-24 2017 Centenario del Pontifico Istituo Orientali (1917-2017), edited by G. Ruyssen and S. Kokkaravalayil. Kanonika 25 Rome:Pontificio Istituto Orientali, 2017) 413–454.
- "Ascription in the Eastern and Latin Churches in Light of De Concordia inter Codices. Presentation given at the Canon Law Society of Australia and New Zealand, Auckland, New Zealand 5 September 2017 in Canon Law Society of Australia and New Zealand, Proceedings Fifty-First Annual Conference 2017, 15-34.
- "Marriage in the Eastern and Latin Churches in Light of De Concordia inter Codices." Presentation given at the Canon Law Society of Australia and New Zealand, Auckland, New Zealand 6 September 2017 in Proceedings Fifty-First Annual Conference 2017, 68–86.
- “Synods, Councils and Assemblies: Hierarchical Structures as Expressions of Synodality," Canon Law Society of America, Proceedings of the Seventy-Eighth Annual Convention. October 10–13, 2016. 187–217.
- ″Particular Law and the Eastern Catholic Diaspora, in A Service beyond All Recompense: Essays in Honor of Monsignor Thomas J. Green, edited by Kurt Martens, 287–311. Washington, DC: The Catholic University of America Press, 2018.
- "The Role of Ecumenism in a Synodal Church," Iustitia 12 (December 2021) 247-268.
- "Ecumenism and the Challenge to Ecclesial Structures." Fifty Years of Encounter among the Eastern Churches Kanon XXVI (Nyíregaza, St. Athanasius Greek-Catholic theological Institute, 2022), 377-394.
- "The Role of Consultation in Eparchial Governance." Studia Canonica 56 (2022) 605-627.
- "Law that Cannot Follow. Canon 150 and the Structural Crisis of Particular Law in the Eastern Catholic Churches. Studio canonica 60 (2026) 73-103.
- "Ascription Reconsidered: Current Norms, Contemporary Realities, and Future Possibilities." The Jurist 82 (2026) 125-186.

== Sources ==
- Biographical Note in Eastern Catholic Churches: Constitution and Governance
