= Robert Joseph Shaheen =

His Grace, The Most Reverend Robert Joseph Shaheen
- Eparch Emeritus of Our Lady of Lebanon of Los Angeles
- Church: Maronite Catholic Church
- Diocese: Maronite Catholic Eparchy of Our Lady of Lebanon of Los Angeles
- Installed: February 15, 2001
- Term ended: July 10, 2013
- Predecessor: John George Chedid
- Successor: Abdallah Elias Zaidan

Orders
- Ordination: May 2, 1964 by Francis Mansour Zayek
- Consecration: February 15, 2001 by Nasrallah Boutros Sfeir, Francis Mansour Zayek, Roland Aboujaoudé, John George Chedid and Stephen Youssef Doueihi

Personal details
- Born: 3 June 1937 Danbury, Connecticut
- Died: 9 August 2017 (aged 80) St. Louis, Missouri

Styles of Robert Joseph Shaheen
- Reference style: His Grace; The Most Reverend
- Spoken style: His Grace
- Religious style: Eparch

Robert Joseph Shaheen (3 June 1937 – 9 August 2017) was an American prelate of the Maronite Catholic Church. He was the former Eparch of the Eparchy of Our Lady of Lebanon. He resided at St. Raymond's Cathedral in St. Louis, Missouri.

== Life ==
Shaheen was born to Albert and Aileen Shaheen in Danbury, Connecticut; his grandfather came to the United States from Lebanon in 1898. He attended St. Peter Grammar School and Danbury High School before entering St. Thomas Seminary in Bloomfield in 1955. In 1958, he transferred to the Eastern rite St. Basil Seminary in Methuen, Massachusetts, while attending classes at St. Anselm College in Goffstown, New Hampshire.

After being ordained a subdeacon (October 2, 1962) and deacon (June 7, 1963), Shaheen was ordained a priest by Bishop Francis Mansour Zayek on May 2, 1964, at the Basilica of the National Shrine of the Immaculate Conception. Shortly after his ordination, he became pastor of St. Raymond's Church in St. Louis, Missouri, which had then been without a resident priest for over 20 years. Under his leadership, St. Raymond's went from just a few faithful parishioners using a four-family apartment to a cathedral with hundreds of active families.

From 1965 to 1970, he organized and celebrated Maronite liturgies on regular basis. He also developed newsletters, bulletins, and fliers; conducted a census to identify Maronites in the greater metropolitan area; and introduced spiritual and cultural programs, including Maronite religious education classes. He hosted National Aposolate of Maronites Convention in 1970. Kicking-off a fund drive for new church in 1971, he later dedicated a new church in November 1975 and a new rectory in February 1977. He was ordained an archpriest in September 1978, and dedicated a new parish center "The Cedars" in November 1979.

On March 31, 1986, Shaheen was ordained a Chorbishop by Archbishop Zayek. He purchased additional property and buildings for future development as a Maronite retirement center and cultural center in 1991, and again hosted the National Apostolate of Maronites Convention in 1995.

On December 5, 2000, Shaheen was appointed Eparch of the Eparchy of Our Lady of Lebanon by Pope John Paul II, following the retirement of Our Lady of Lebanon's first bishop, John George Chedid. He was consecrated a bishop on February 15, 2001, by Nasrallah Boutros Sfeir, the Patriarch of Antioch and All the East. and his co-consecrators were Roland Aboujaoudé, auxiliary bishop in Antioch, John George Chedid, retired bishop of Our Lady of Lebanon in Los Angeles, Stephen Hector Youssef Doueihi, Bishop of Saint Maron in Brooklyn, and Francis Mansour Zayek, Archbishop Emeritus ad personam of Saint Maron in Brooklyn.

Shaheen was the first Lebanese Maronite priest or bishop from the United States. Pope Francis accepted his age-related resignation on July 10, 2013.

Shaheen died on August 9, 2017, in St. Louis at the age of 80. He was buried in his birthplace of Danbury, Connecticut on August 21.

== See also ==
- Catholic Church hierarchy
- Catholic Church in the United States
- Historical list of the Catholic bishops of the United States
- List of Catholic bishops of the United States
- Lists of patriarchs, archbishops, and bishops

== Episcopal succession ==
Catholic Church titles
Preceded by John George Chedid	Eparch of Our Lady of Lebanon of Los Angeles; 2001-2013	Succeeded by Abdallah Elias Zaidan
