= John Faris =

John Faris may refer to:

- John D. Faris (born 1951), Maronite Catholic priest
- John Thomson Faris (1871–1949), American editor, author, and clergyman
