= St. Raymond's Cathedral =

St. Raymond's Cathedral may refer to:

United States

- Cathedral of St. Raymond Nonnatus, Joliet, Illinois
- St. Raymond Maronite Cathedral (St. Louis, Missouri)
