= Maronite Catholic Eparchy of Our Lady of Lebanon of Los Angeles =

Eastern Catholic ecclesiastical jurisdiction in the United States

Coordinates: 34°04′23″N 118°22′38″W

Eparchy of Our Lady of Lebanon of Los Angeles Eparchia Dominae Nostrae Libanensis in civitate Angelorum in California Maronitarum
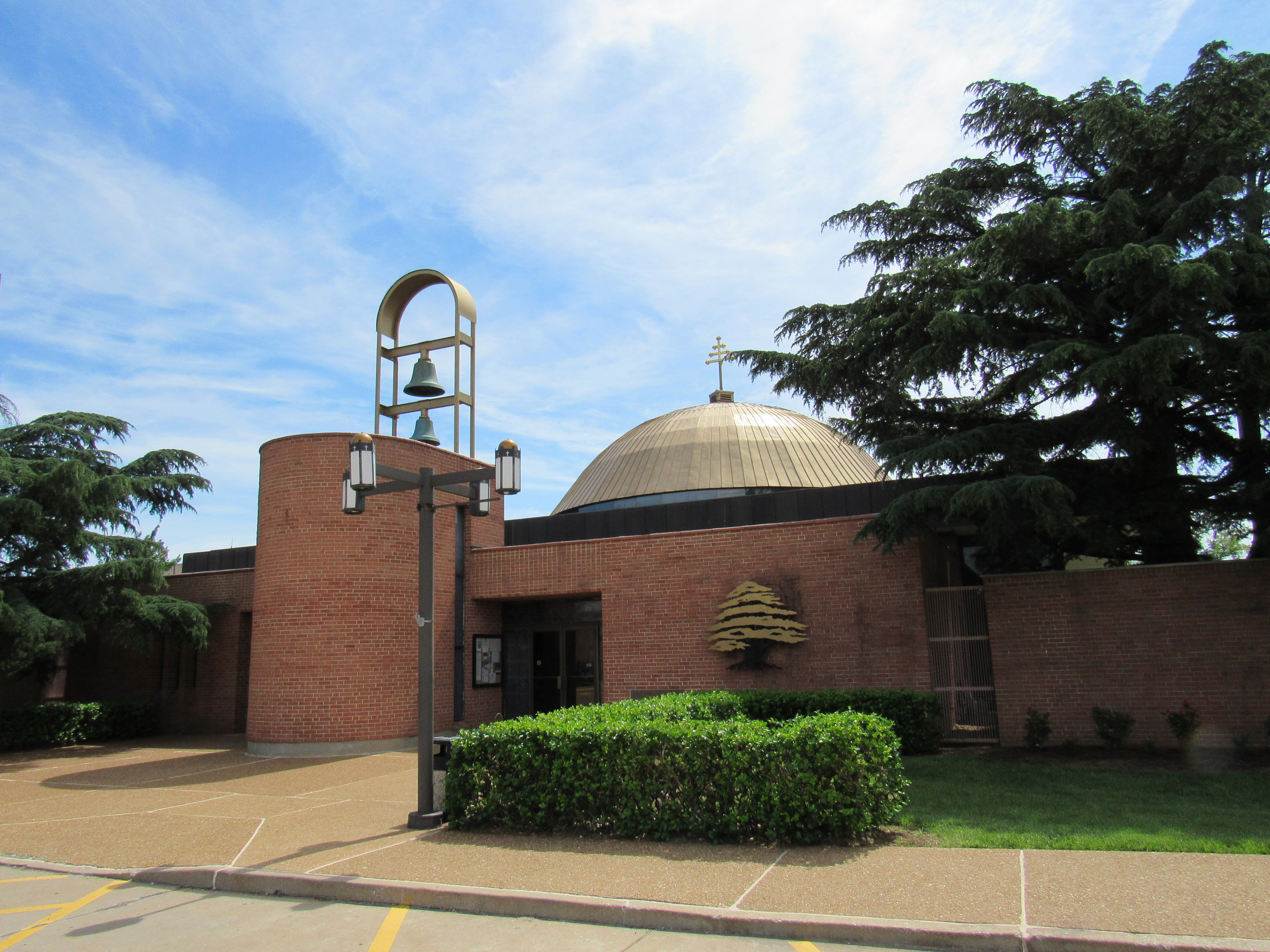
- St. Raymond's Cathedral in St. Louis

Location
- Country: United States
- Ecclesiastical province: Immediately Subject to the Holy See

Statistics
- Population: (as of 2013); 52,300
- Parishes: 35

Information
- Denomination: Catholic Church
- Sui iuris church: Maronite Church
- Rite: West Syro-Antiochene Rite
- Established: February 19, 1994 (32 years ago)
- Cathedral: Our Lady of Mt. Lebanon-St. Peter Cathedral (Los Angeles)
- Co-cathedral: St. Raymond Maronite Cathedral (St. Louis, Missouri)

Current leadership
- Pope: Leo XIV
- Patriarch: Bechara Boutros al-Rahi
- Eparch: Abdallah Elias Zaidan

Map
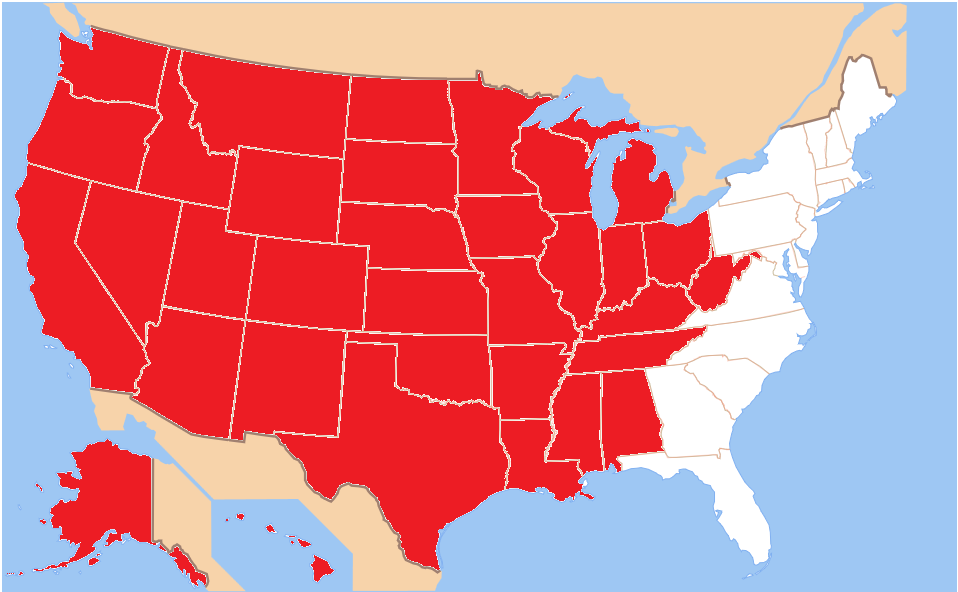

Website
- www.eparchy.org

The Eparchy of Our Lady of Lebanon of Los Angeles (Latin: Eparchia Dominae Nostrae Libanensis in civitate Angelorum in California Maronitarum), is a Antiochene Syriac Maronite Church eparchy of the Catholic Church headquartered in St. Louis, Missouri with jurisdiction over the Maronite faithful in the western and central United States. In conformity with the Code of Canons of the Eastern Churches (CCEO), the Eparchy is under the direct jurisdiction of the Roman Pontiff. In 2013 there were 52,300 baptized members. It is currently ruled by eparch Abdallah Elias Zaidan, MLM.

== Territory and statistics ==
The eparchy includes the faithful of the Maronite Church in thirty-four western, central and southern states of the United States of America. With a decree from the Sacred Congregation of the Eastern Churches, dated July 10, 2001, the see of the Eparchy of Our Lady of Lebanon was transferred to St. Louis, Missouri, with St. Raymond Church, in St. Louis, elevated to the rank of Co-Cathedral., as of 9 Sep 2011, the history quoted here was a verbatim copy of the history page of the Eparchy website. Its see cathedral is Our Lady of Mt. Lebanon-St. Peter Cathedral in Los Angeles.

Its territory is divided into 35 parishes and in 2013 had 52,300 American Maronites.

== History ==
Immigration of Maronite Christianity from Greater Syria to the United States began during the latter part of the nineteenth century. When they were able to obtain a priest, communities were established under the jurisdiction of the local Latin Bishops.

Pope Paul VI, with the Apostolic Constitution Cum supremi of January 10, 1966, established the Maronite Apostolic Exarchate for the Maronite faithful of the United States. Francis Mansour Zayek was appointed the first bishop in a decree of the Sacred Congregation for the Eastern Churches dated January 27, 1966. The See city was Detroit, Michigan, with a Cathedral under the patronage of St Maron. At that time, the Exarchate was a suffragan of the Archdiocese of Detroit.

On November 29, 1971, Pope Paul VI, with the Apostolic Constitution Quae spes, the Exarchate was elevated to the status of an Eparchy, with the name of Eparchy of St. Maron of Detroit. With a decree from the Sacred Congregation of the Eastern Churches dated June 27, 1977, the see of the Eparchy of St. Maron was transferred to Brooklyn, New York, with the cathedral under the patronage of Our Lady of Lebanon. The name of the Eparchy was modified to Eparchy of St. Maron of Brooklyn. On December 10, 1982, Pope John Paul II accorded the title of "Archbishop ad personam" to Bishop Zayek as recognition of his personal contributions to the Catholic Church.

With the papal bull Omnium Catholicorum promulgated on 19 February 1994, Pope John Paul II erected the Eparchy of Our Lady of Lebanon of Los Angeles, came from the Maronite Catholic Eparchy of St. Maron of Brooklyn as a second eparchy for Maronite Catholics in the United States, with the territory of thirty-four (34) states - Ohio, West Virginia, Illinois, Alabama, Michigan, Minnesota, Missouri, Texas, Utah, Arizona, Nevada, Oregon, California, Alaska, Hawaii, Indiana, Kentucky, Tennessee, Mississippi, Wisconsin, Iowa, Arkansas, Louisiana, North Dakota, South Dakota, Kansas, Oklahoma, Nebraska, Montana, Wyoming, Colorado, New Mexico, Idaho and Washington. The pope appointed John George Chedid, formerly Titular Bishop of Callinicum for the Maronites and Auxiliary of the Eparchy of St Maron, as the first eparch with the Cathedral under the patronage of Our Lady of Mt. Lebanon. by Archbishop Francis Mansour Zayek, representing the Maronite Patriarch Nasrallah Boutros Sfeir, enthroned Bishop Chedid on the 24th of June of that year.

On December 5, 2000, the Pope accepted the resignation of Bishop John Chedid due to canonical age, and appointed Chorbishop Robert Joseph Shaheen to the see. Bishop Shaheen was ordained and installed Eparch on February 15, 2001, by Patriarch Nasrallah Peter Sfeir in the Cathedral Basilica of the Archdiocese of Saint Louis, Missouri. Soon after, the Congregation for the Oriental Churches approved the relocation of the eparchy's offices to St. Louis and the elevation of the Church of St. Raphael to the co-cathedral of the eparchy.

On July 10, 2013, Pope Francis accepted the resignation of Bishop Robert J. Shaheen and appointed the Abdallah Elias Zaidan as the new bishop of the Eparchy of Our Lady of Lebanon. Zaidan was ordained as a bishop on September 28, 2013, at the National Shrine of the Basilica Of Our Lady of Lebanon, Mount Harissa, Lebanon, by Cardinal Bechara Peter Rai, Patriarch of Antioch and all the East, and installed as bishop of the Eparchy on October 23, 2013, at St. Raymond's Co-Cathedral in St. Louis, Missouri.

== Parishes and missions ==
Note: Maronites who do not reside within a convenient distance to a local Maronite church attend other Catholic churches, but retain their membership in the Maronite Church.

The territory of the Eparchy of Our Lady of Lebanon comprises the following states, parishes and missions:

Alabama

- Saint Elias Maronite Church (Birmingham)

Arizona

- Saint Joseph Maronite Church (Phoenix)

California

- Saint John Maron Maronite Church (Anaheim)
- Our Lady of the Rosary Mission (Carmichael)
- Our Lady of Lebanon-St Peter Maronite Cathedral (Los Angeles)
- Our Lady of Lebanon Maronite Church (Millbrae)
- Saint Joseph Maronite Mission (Riverside)
- Saint Ephrem Maronite Church (San Diego)
- Saint Sharbel Mission (Stockton)
- Saint Jude Maronite Mission (West Covina)
- Saints Peter and Paul Maronite Mission (San Fernando Valley)

Colorado

- Saint Rafka Maronite Church (Denver)

Illinois

- Our Lady of Lebanon Maronite Church (Lombard)
- Saint Sharbel Maronite Church (Peoria)

Louisiana

- Saint Sharbel Maronite Mission (Baton Rouge)

Michigan

- Saint Maron Maronite Church (Detroit)
- Our Lady of Lebanon Maronite Church (Flint)
- Saint Rafka Maronite Mission (Livonia)
- Saint Sharbel Maronite Church (Clinton Township)

Minnesota

- Saint Maron Maronite Church (Minneapolis)
- Holy Family Maronite Church (Mendota Heights)

Missouri

- Saint Raymond Maronite Cathedral (Saint Louis)

Nevada

- Saint Sharbel Maronite Mission (Las Vegas)

Ohio

- Saint Anthony of Padua Maronite Church (Cincinnati)
- Saint Maron Maronite Church (Cleveland)
- Our Lady of Lebanon Maronite Mission (Columbus)
- Saint Ignatius of Antioch Maronite Church (Dayton)
- Our Lady of the Cedars of Mt. Lebanon Maronite Church (Fairlawn)
- Basilica and National Shrine of Our Lady of Lebanon (North Jackson, Ohio)
- Saint Maron Maronite Church (Youngstown)

Oklahoma

- Our Lady of Lebanon Maronite Mission (Norman)
- Saint Therese Maronite Church (Tulsa)

Oregon

- Saint Sharbel Maronite Church (Portland)

Texas

- Our Lady’s Maronite Church (Austin)
- Saint Sharbel Maronite Church (El Paso)
- Our Lady of Cedars Maronite Church (Houston)
- Our Lady of Lebanon Maronite Church (Lewisville)
- Saint George Maronite Church (San Antonio)

Utah

- Saint Jude Maronite Church (Murray)

Wisconsin

- Maronite Mission of Milwaukee (Sturtevant)

West Virginia

- Our Lady of Lebanon Maronite Church (Wheeling)

== Other communities ==
The Eparchy of Our Lady of Lebanon also has under its jurisdiction two monasteries:

Michigan

Maronite Order of the Blessed Virgin Mary (Ann Arbor)

Oregon

Monks of Jesus, Mary and Joseph (Beaverton/Portland)

== Eparchs ==
- John George Chedid † (February 19, 1994 – November 20, 2000) Retired
- Robert Joseph Shaheen † (December 5, 2000 – July 10, 2013) Retired
- Abdallah Elias Zaidan, MLM (since July 10, 2013)

=== Other priest of this eparchy who became bishop ===
- Gregory John Mansour, appointed Bishop of Saint Maron of Brooklyn (Maronite) in 2004

== See also ==
- Maronite Eparchy of Saint Maron of Brooklyn
- List of Catholic bishops of the United States § Eastern Catholic eparchs
