= Kozar (surname) =

Kozar is a surname. Notable people with the surname include:

- Bernie Kosar (born 1963), NFL football quarterback
- Heather Kozar (born 1976), American model
- Al Kozar (1921–2007), American baseball player
- Alen Kozar (born 1995), Slovenian footballer
- John E. Kozar, American Roman Catholic priest
