= St. Raymond Maronite Cathedral (St. Louis, Missouri) =

Maronite Catholic co-cathedral in the US

St. Raymond's Cathedral
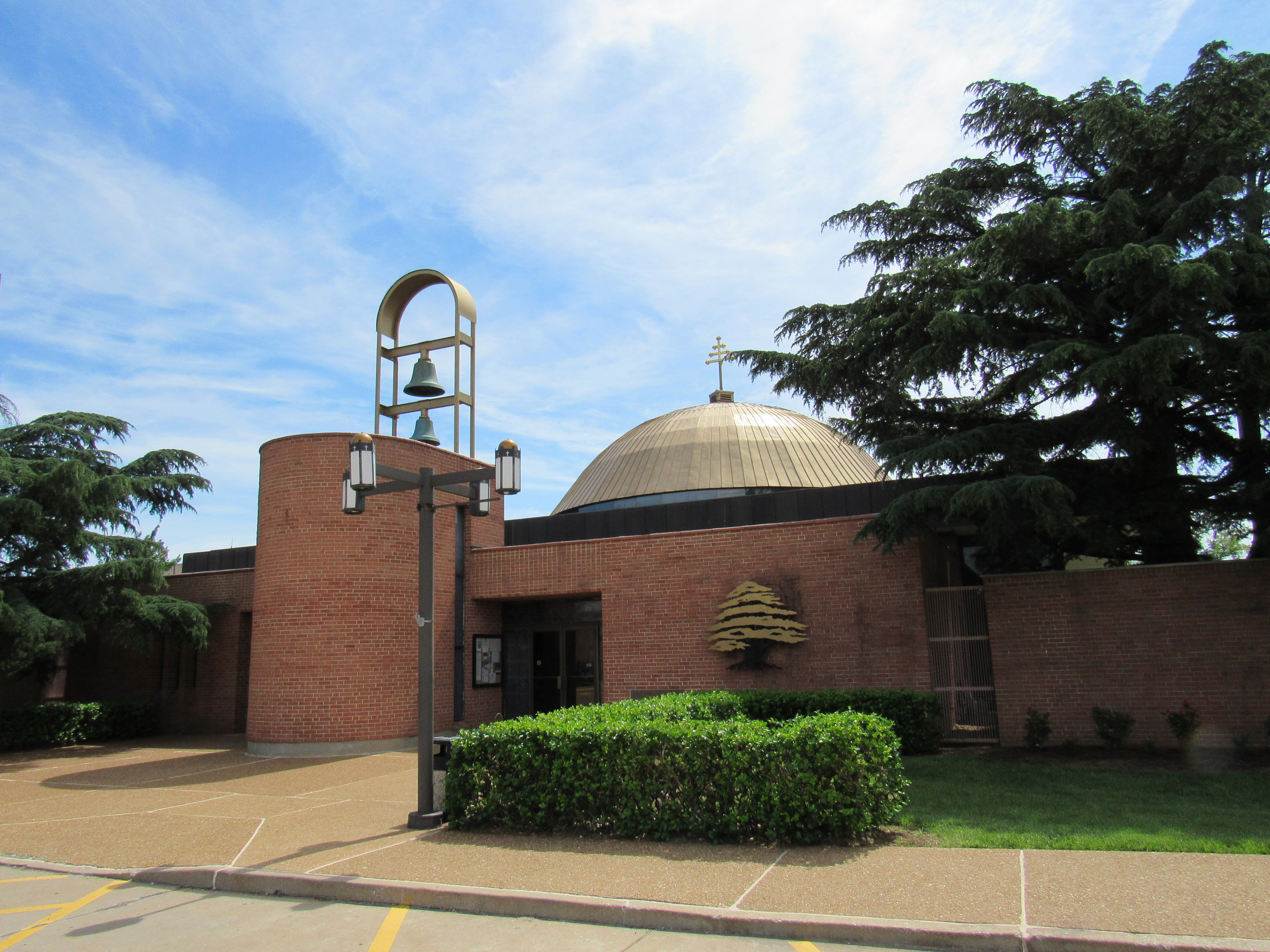

- Location within Missouri
- 38°37′3.91″N 90°11′56.81″W
- Location: 931 Lebanon Dr. St. Louis, Missouri
- Country: United States
- Denomination: Catholic Church
- Sui iuris church: Maronite Church
- Website: straymond-mc.org

History
- Founded: 1911

Architecture
- Style: Byzantine Revival
- Completed: 1975

Administration
- Diocese: Eparchy of Our Lady of Lebanon of Los Angeles

Clergy
- Bishop: Most Rev. Abdallah Elias Zaidan
- Rector: Very Rev. John Nahal

St. Raymond's Cathedral is a Maronite Catholic co-cathedral located in St. Louis, Missouri, United States. It is the seat of the Eparchy of Our Lady of Lebanon of Los Angeles along with Our Lady of Mt. Lebanon-St. Peter Cathedral in Los Angeles.

== History ==
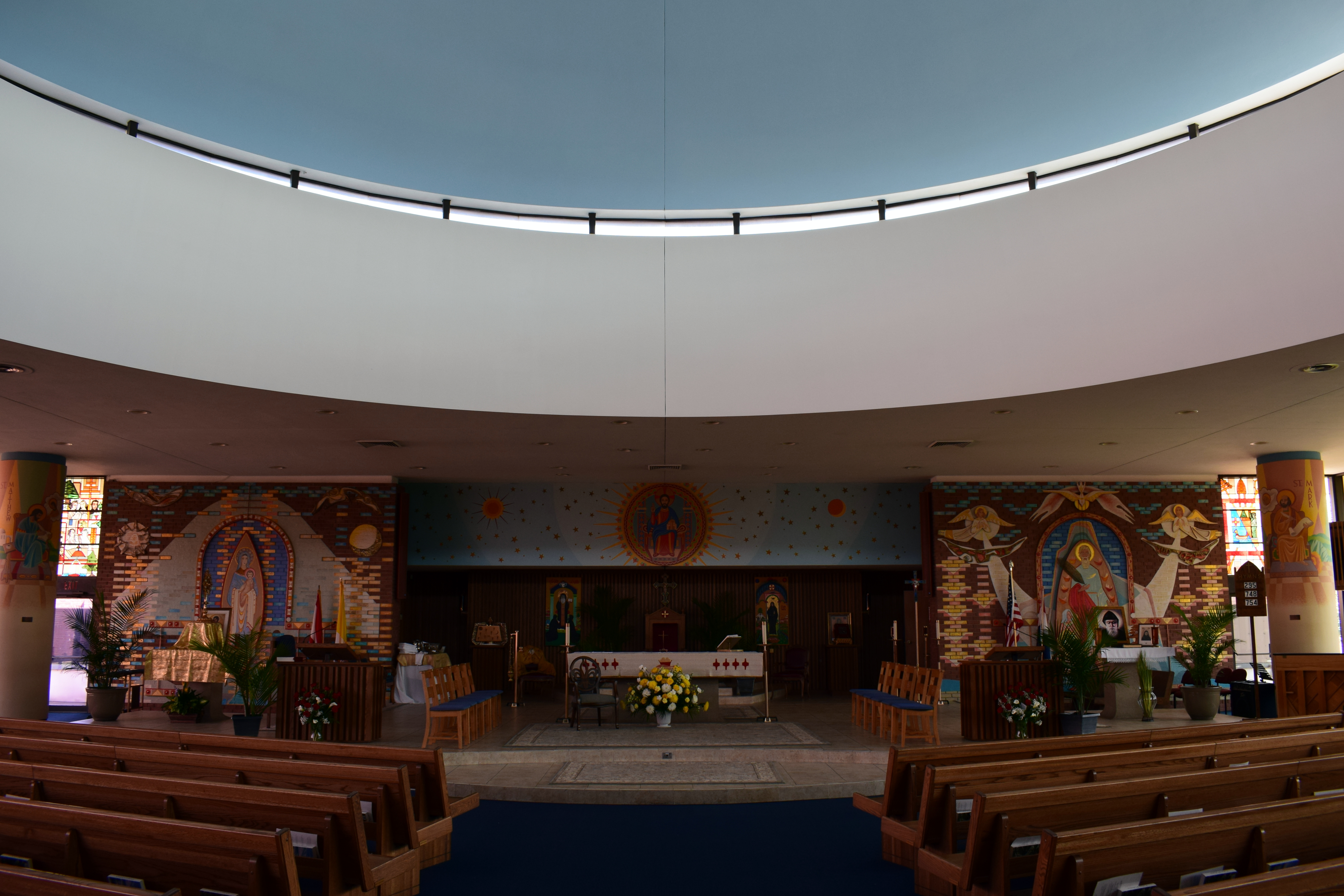
Cathedral interior

Lebanese and Syrian immigrants started to settle along the Mississippi River in St. Louis in the late 19th century. In 1898 they started St. Anthony the Hermit Parish with an Antonine monk, Father George Emmanuel, as their first priest. A group of immigrants from Hadchit, Lebanon, secured property at 923-25 LaSalle Street from the estate of J.G. Choteau and St. Raymond's Church was founded. Father Joseph Karam came from Hadchit the following year to be the parish's first pastor. A parish hall was built in 1951. The present church was completed in 1975.

Father Robert Shaheen, who had been at St. Raymond's since 1967, was named bishop of the Eparchy of Our Lady of Lebanon in 2000. The following year St. Raymond's was named a co-cathedral. A pastoral center was completed in 2002 to serve as the headquarters of the Eparchy. The shrine to Our Lady of St. Louis was dedicated in 2007, and the Maronite Heritage Institute was opened in 2011.

On February 27, 2014, the Rev. Wissam Akiki was ordained to the priesthood at St. Raymond Cathedral by Bishop Elias Zaidan. Pope Francis gave his approval for the ordination, which made Akiki the first married Maronite priest to be ordained in the United States in nearly a century.

== See also ==
- Saint Raymond
- List of Catholic cathedrals in the United States
- List of cathedrals in the United States
