= Romanus of Caesarea =

Syrian Christian saint (died c. 303)

Saint Romanus of Caesarea
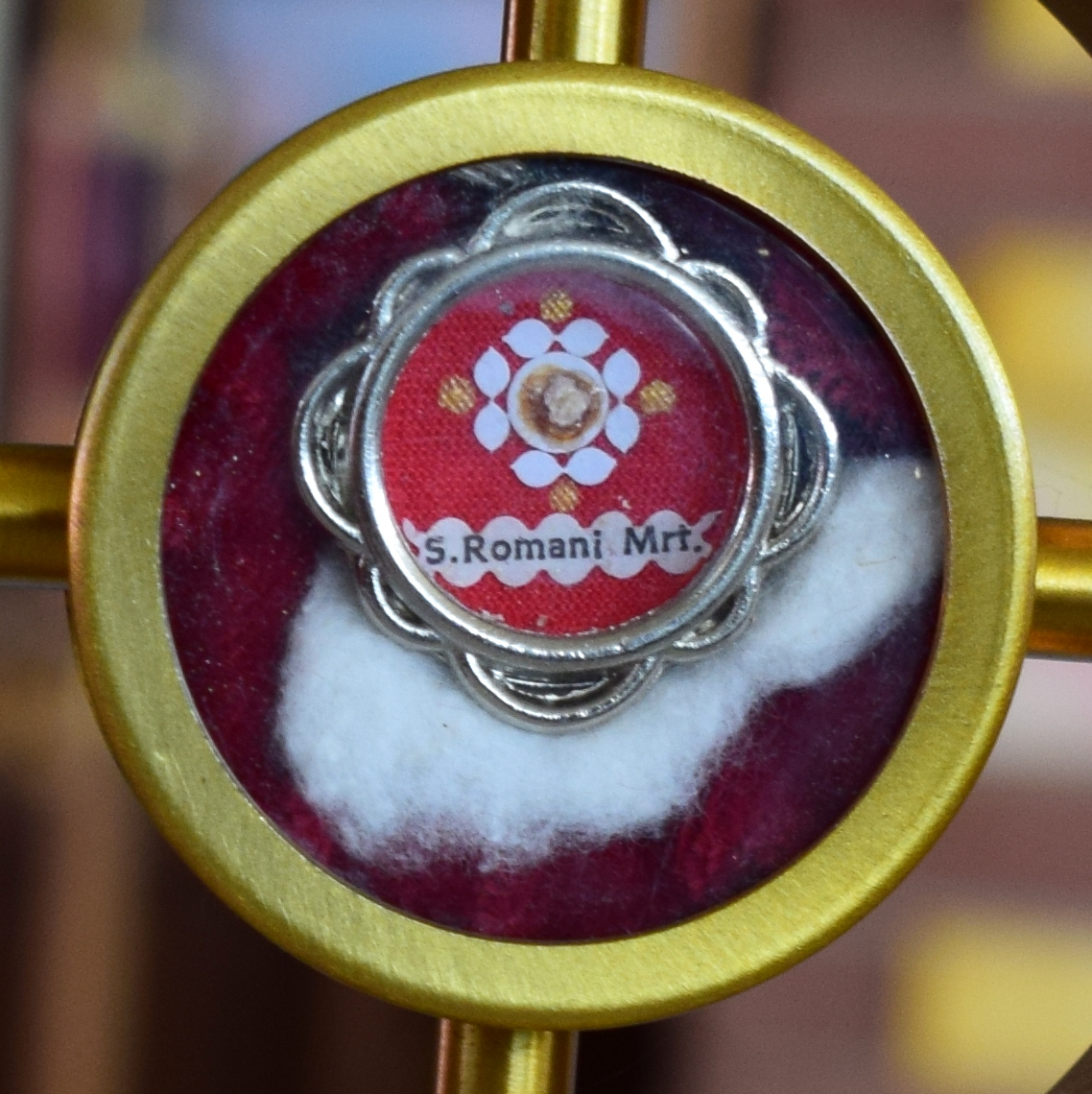
- Relic of Romanus at St. Raymond Maronite Cathedral (St. Louis, Missouri), a church named for him.
- Died: c. 303 AD
- Venerated in: Roman Catholic Church, Eastern Orthodox Church, Oriental Orthodox Church, Maronite Church
- Feast: November 18

Romanus of Caesarea (Greek: Ρωμανός), also known as Romanus of Antioch or Raymond, is a Christian martyr and saint. A deacon of Caesarea, he was martyred at Antioch.

== Life ==
In 303 or 304, at the beginning of the Diocletianic Persecution, a deacon called Romanus, served in Caesarea in Palestine. He was living in Antioch where in the midst of the persecutions, he encouraged the Christians to stand firm.

During a pagan festival, he upbraided the participants for worshiping idols. Taken prisoner, he was condemned to death by fire, and was bound to the stake. When rain extinguished the flames, Romanus was brought before Emperor Galerius who was then in Antioch. At the emperor's command Romanus' tongue was cut out. Tortured in various ways in prison he was finally strangled.

Eusebius speaks of his martyrdom in De martyribus Palaestinae. Prudentius relates other details and gives Romanus a companion in martyrdom, a Christian by name Barulas. On this account several historians, among them Baronius, consider that there were two martyrs named Romanus at Antioch, though more likely there was but the one whom Eusebius mentions. Prudentius has introduced legendary features into his account, and his connection of the martyrdom of Barulas with that of Romanus is probably arbitrary.

The feast day of Saint Romanus is observed on 18 November. The church of San Román in Seville is dedicated to Romanus. Prudentius wrote a 1140 line hymn to Romanus, the Romane Christi fortis, the tenth hymn in his Peristephanon.

Barulas
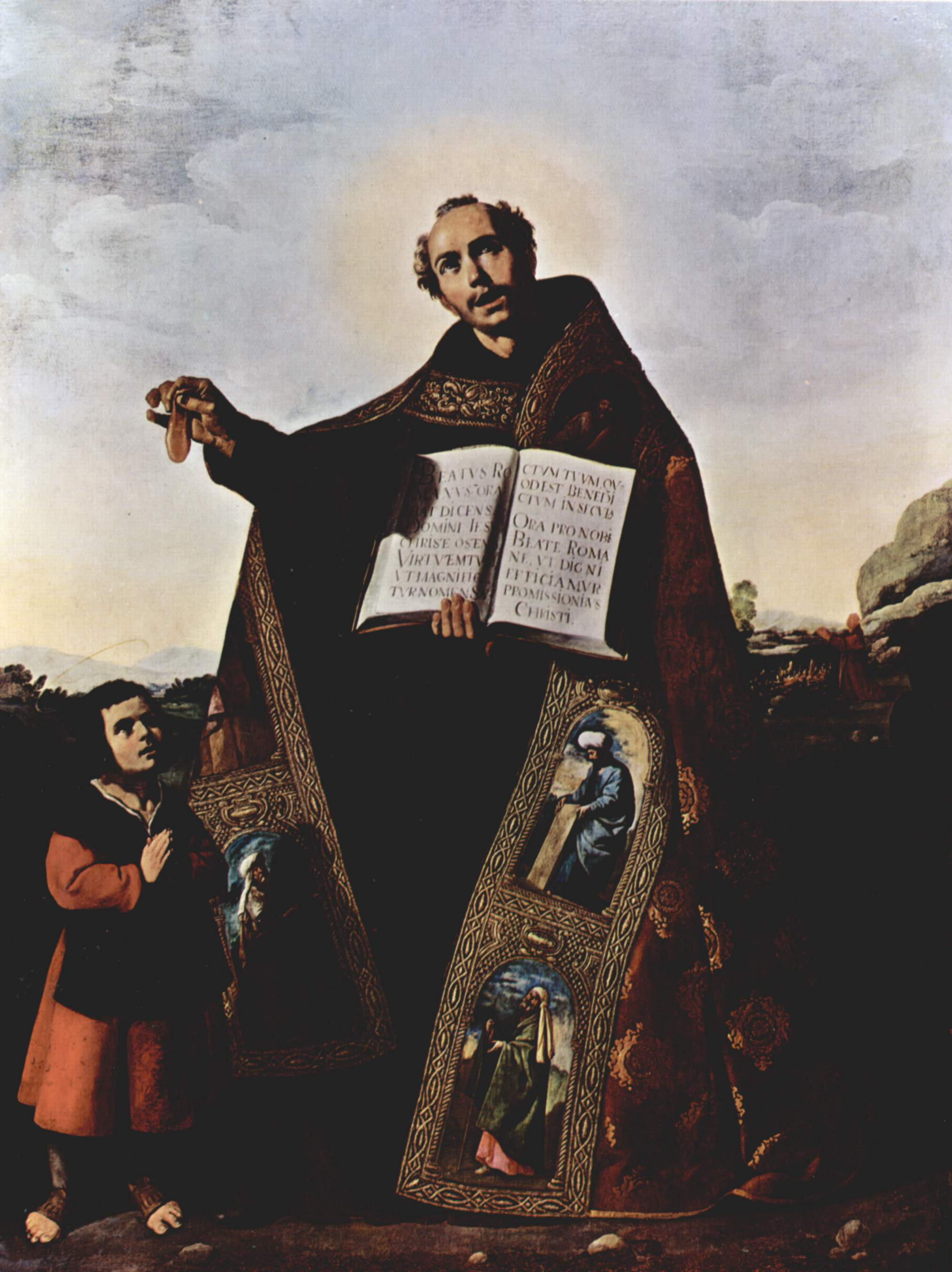
- Saints Romanus and Barulas, by Francisco de Zurbarán. The book says, in Latin, "Blessed Romanus was praying when he said, Lord Jesus Christ, show thy might, that thy holy name may be glorified, which is blessed forever. Pray for us blessed Romanus, that we may be made worthy of the promises of Christ."
- Died: 303
- Venerated in: Roman Catholic Church, Eastern Orthodox Church, Armenian Apostolic Church
- Feast: 18 November

== Barulas ==
Barulas (died 303) was a seven-year-old boy who was martyred along with Romanus of Caesarea by Emperor Galerius by being whipped and beheaded for their Christian beliefs. Barulas, like Quiricus, is venerated as a child-martyr. His feast day is on November 18.

== Sources ==
- Martyr Romanus the Deacon of Caesarea and child-martyr Barulas of Antioch (303)
