= Our Lady of Lebanon Maronite Cathedral (Brooklyn) =

Our Lady of Lebanon Cathedral
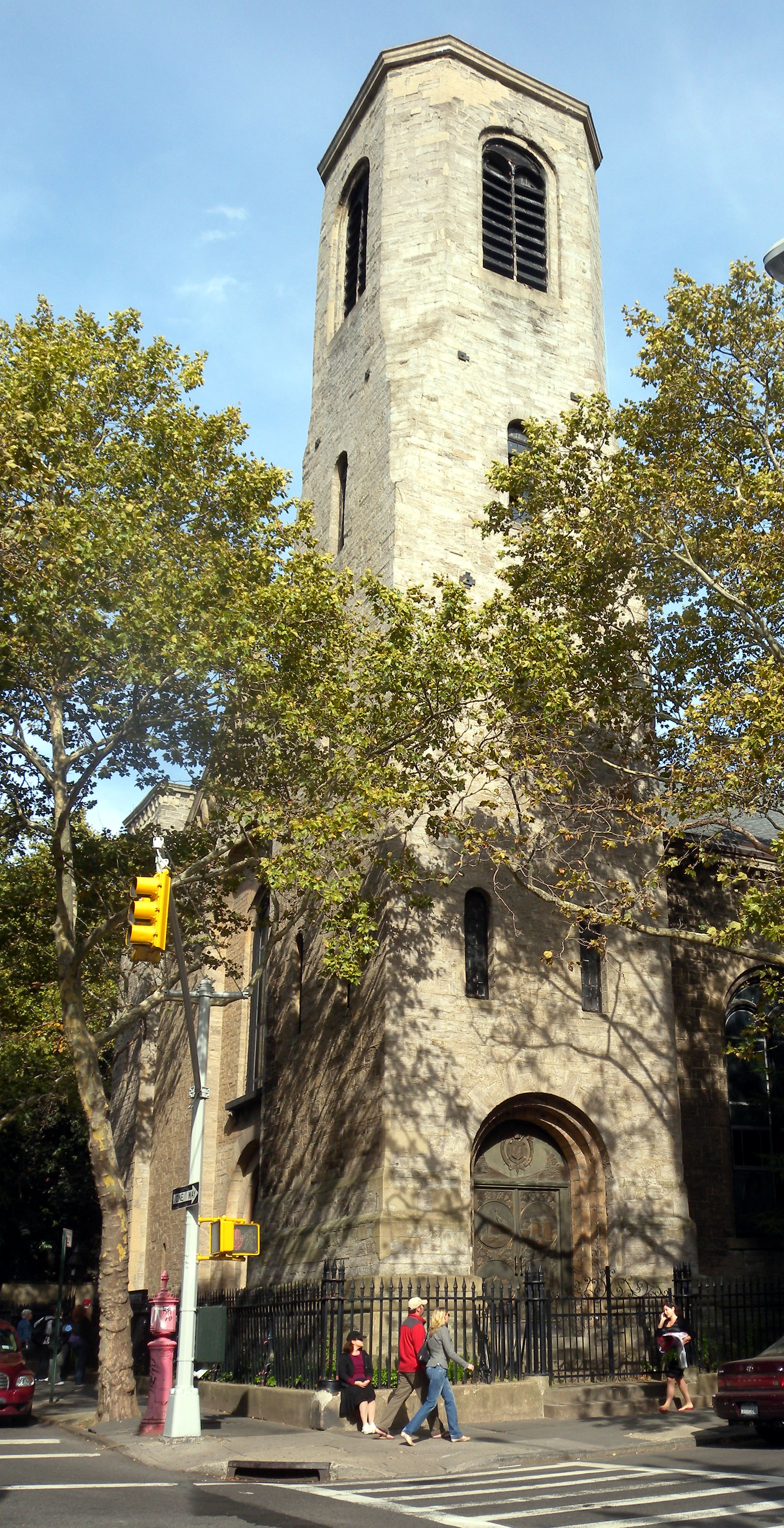

- Location within New York City
- 40°41′39.23″N 73°59′39.14″W
- Location: 113 Remsen St. Brooklyn, New York
- Country: United States
- Denomination: Catholic Church
- Previous denomination: Congregational Christian Church
- Sui iuris church: Maronite Church
- Website: ololc.org

History
- Founded: February 17, 1903

Architecture
- Architect: Richard Upjohn
- Style: Romanesque Revival
- Groundbreaking: 1844 (Church of the Pilgrims)
- Completed: 1846 (Church of the Pilgrims)
- Construction cost: $65,000

Administration
- Diocese: Eparchy of St. Maron of Brooklyn

Clergy
- Bishop: Most Rev. Gregory Mansour
- Rector: Very Rev. James A. Root

Our Lady of Lebanon Cathedral is a Maronite Catholic cathedral located in Brooklyn, New York, United States. It is the seat of the Eparchy of St. Maron of Brooklyn. It is located in the neighborhood of Brooklyn Heights in the oldest northwest section of the borough, across the East River from Manhattan. The church building originally housed the "Church of the Pilgrims" of the old Congregational Christian Church, (merged 1957 into the United Church of Christ).

== History ==
The Maronite Catholic community was established in New York when St. Joseph's Church was founded in Manhattan. Father Khairallah Stephen, its first priest, arrived in New York in 1900. Father Stephen purchased a large brownstone at 295–297 Hicks Street in Brooklyn in 1902 using $2000 of his money and $600 in donations. The church was incorporated as “The Roman Catholic Church of Our Lady of Lebanon” on February 17, 1903. Services began the following year. The church was on the main floor of the building and the rectory on the second floor. The basement and the main floor were combined and the renovated church was dedicated in January 1906. The congregation grew over the next several decades necessitating a larger church. Father Mansour Stephen, Father Khairallah Stephen's nephew, purchased the former Congregational Church of the Pilgrims on December 8, 1943, for $70,000. The new church of Our Lady of Lebanon was dedicated on Sunday, November 26, 1944. The brownstone residence behind the church was purchased on December 30, 1944, by a parishioner, George Jebaily. On June 27, 1977, the See city for the Eparchy of St. Maron-USA was transferred from Detroit to Brooklyn. Our Lady of Lebanon was designated the cathedral on the same day.

== Church of the Pilgrims ==
The church building predates the congregation that worships there. It was built as the Church of the Pilgrims for $65,000. It was designed in the Romanesque Revival style by Richard Upjohn, who was known for his Gothic Revival church buildings for the Episcopal Church. The cornerstone was laid on December 22, 1844, and the first service was held in the building on May 12, 1846. A couple of changes were made during construction. A truss bridge had to be added when the timbers that supported the roof were found to be inadequate. Side galleries, which increased seating capacity, were also added. Ten columns were added in the 1850s to provide further support for the roof. An addition designed by Leopold Eidlitz was begun in 1869. It added 450 seats to the church, a large lecture room, and other rooms for classes and meetings. Membership at the Church of the Pilgrims and the nearby Plymouth Church declined in the early Twentieth Century due to changes in the population of Brooklyn Heights. In 1934 they merged to form Plymouth Church of the Pilgrims and utilized the Plymouth Church facilities.

== Architecture ==
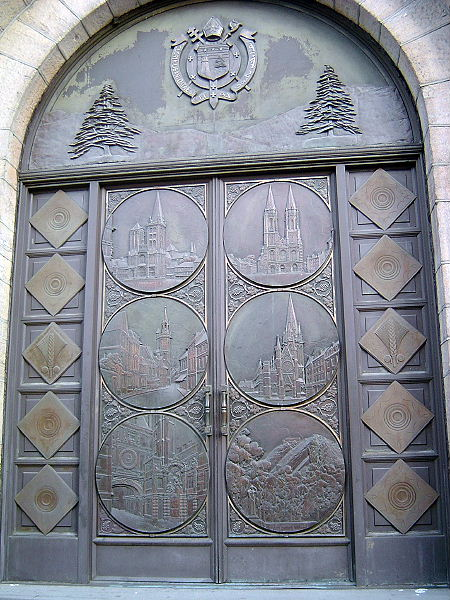
Church doors, with repurposed medallions originally created in 1935 by Raymond Subes for the ocean liner SS Normandie

The church's exterior doors had originally been used as the dining hall doors of the French luxury liner, the SS Normandie. They feature ten medallions showing nine cities in Normandy and one that features the Normandie's sister ship, the SS Ile de France. The doors were altered to fit the church's entrances. Six medallions are on the main entrance on Henry Street and four medallions are on the Remsen Street doors. There is also a set of mahogany doors and marble pilasters in the narthex that came from Charles M. Schwab's New York City mansion.

The church's original stained glass windows were relocated to Plymouth Church of the Pilgrims when the two congregations merged. Swiss artist Jean Crotti created new windows for Our Lady of Lebanon using the Gemmaux method by which pieces of colored glass are held together by colorless enamel. The ten windows were created for the church in Crotti's workshop in France during 1953. Problems developed in the windows created by Crotti, and so in the late 1950s Lebanese artist Sabiha Douaihy made additional windows and worked on the existing windows for the church.

Other furnishings of note include the marble and onyx flooring in the sanctuary, which was originally in the French and Lebanese Pavilions at the 1939 New York World's Fair. The solid bronze baptistery gates were created in the region of Northern Italy and Southern Germany in the 17th century. The Saint Rafqa Chapel features a bas relief of Our Lady in Chains circa 1526. Behind the altar is a mural of Our Lady of Harissa who is depicted standing on the top of the Lebanese mountains looking down upon the sea coast. It was completed by Lebanese artist Saliba Douaihy in 1952.

The pipe organ was originally built as E. & G. G. Hook, opus 519 in 1870, and extensively rebuilt as the Austin Organ Company, opus 259 in 1909. It features three manuals, 25 stops, 23 ranks and 1,525 pipes. After the church was transferred to the Maronite congregation the Austin console near the front of the church, where the pipes are located, was replaced with a new Tellers Organ Company console in the rear gallery. In 1987 an attempt was made to relocate the console closer to the organ. The main cable was severed during the project and has yet to be repaired.

== Gallery ==
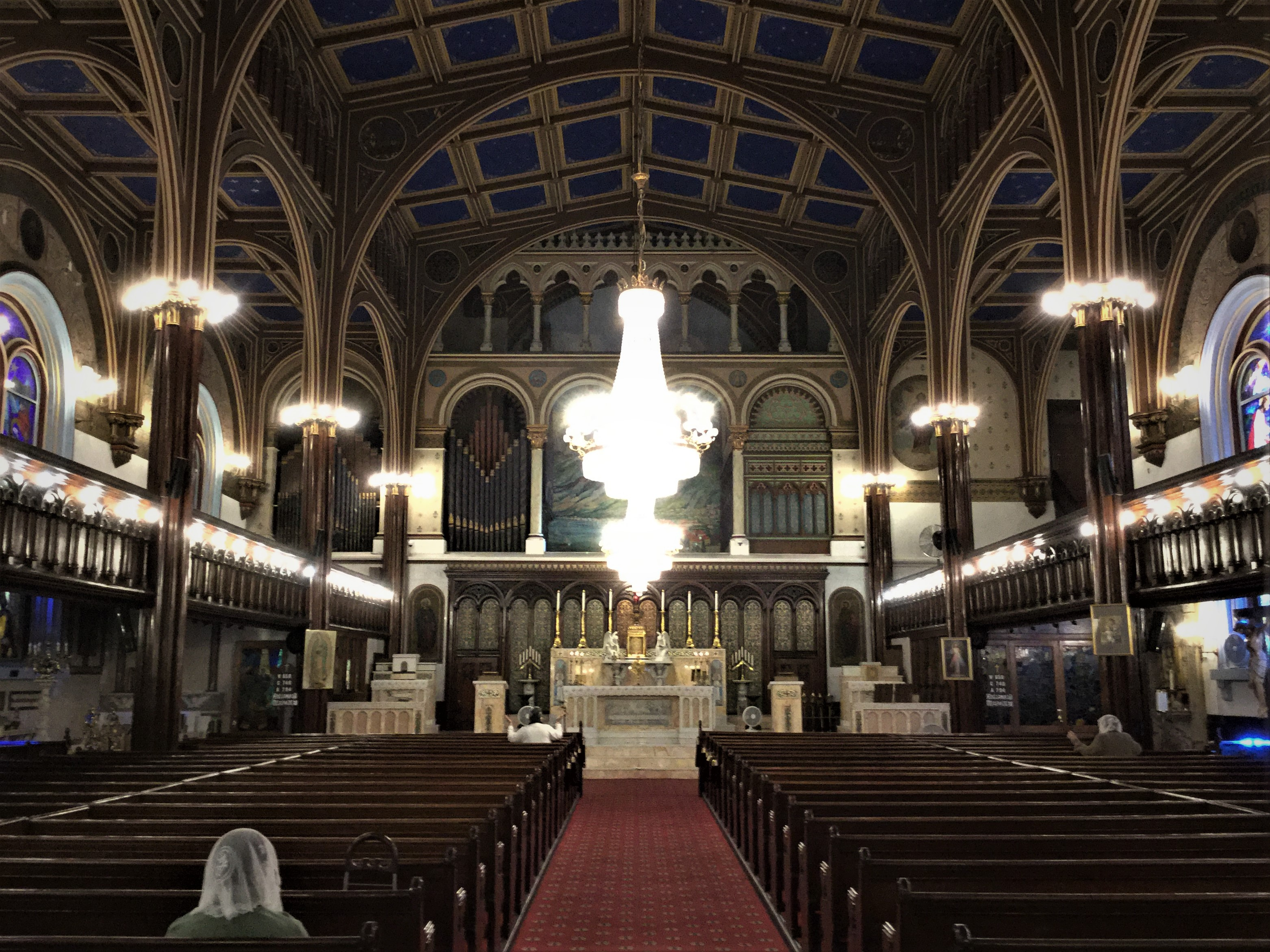
Interior, Our Lady of Lebanon Maronite Cathedral

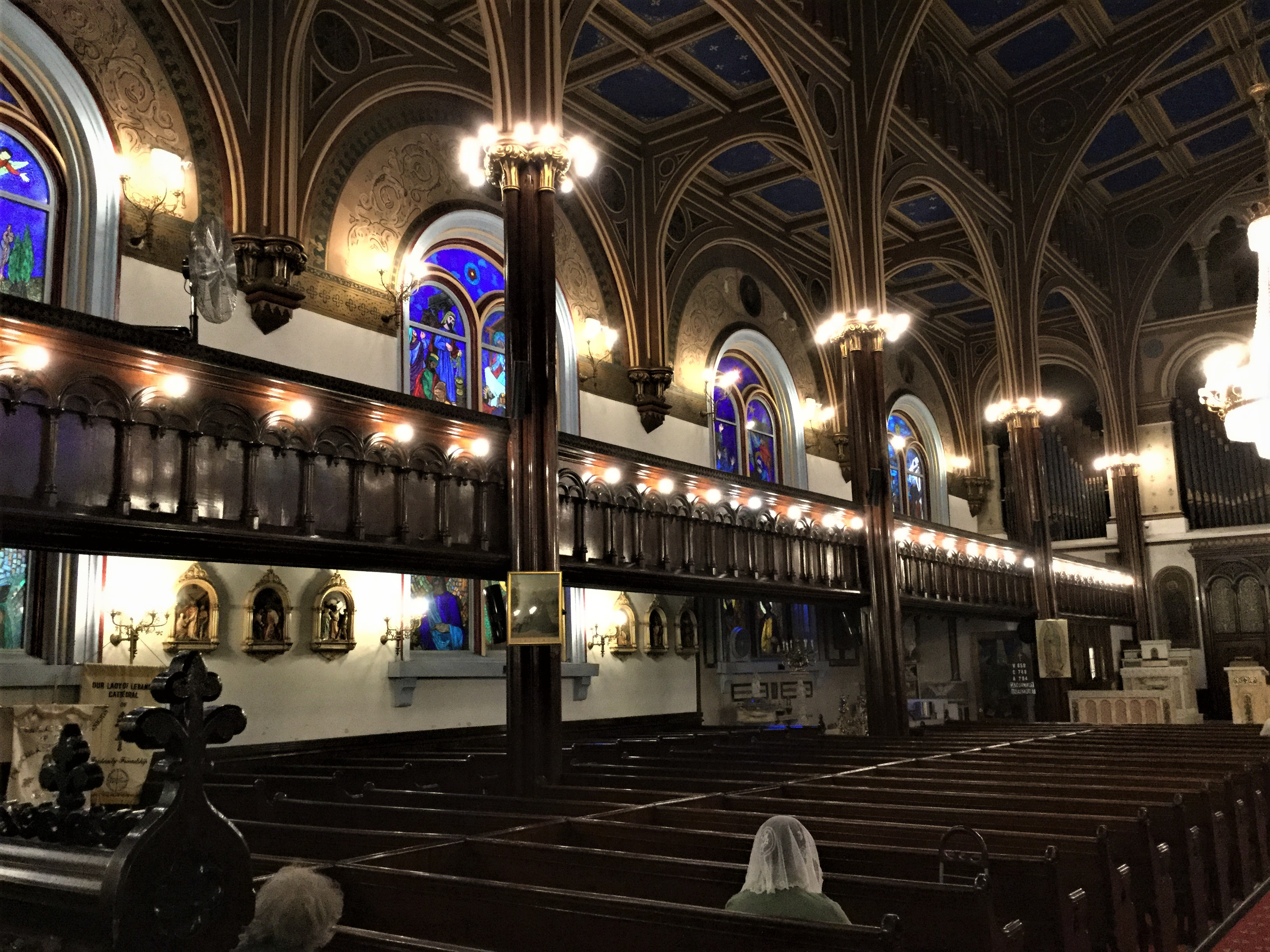
Stained Glass on the left side of the cathedral

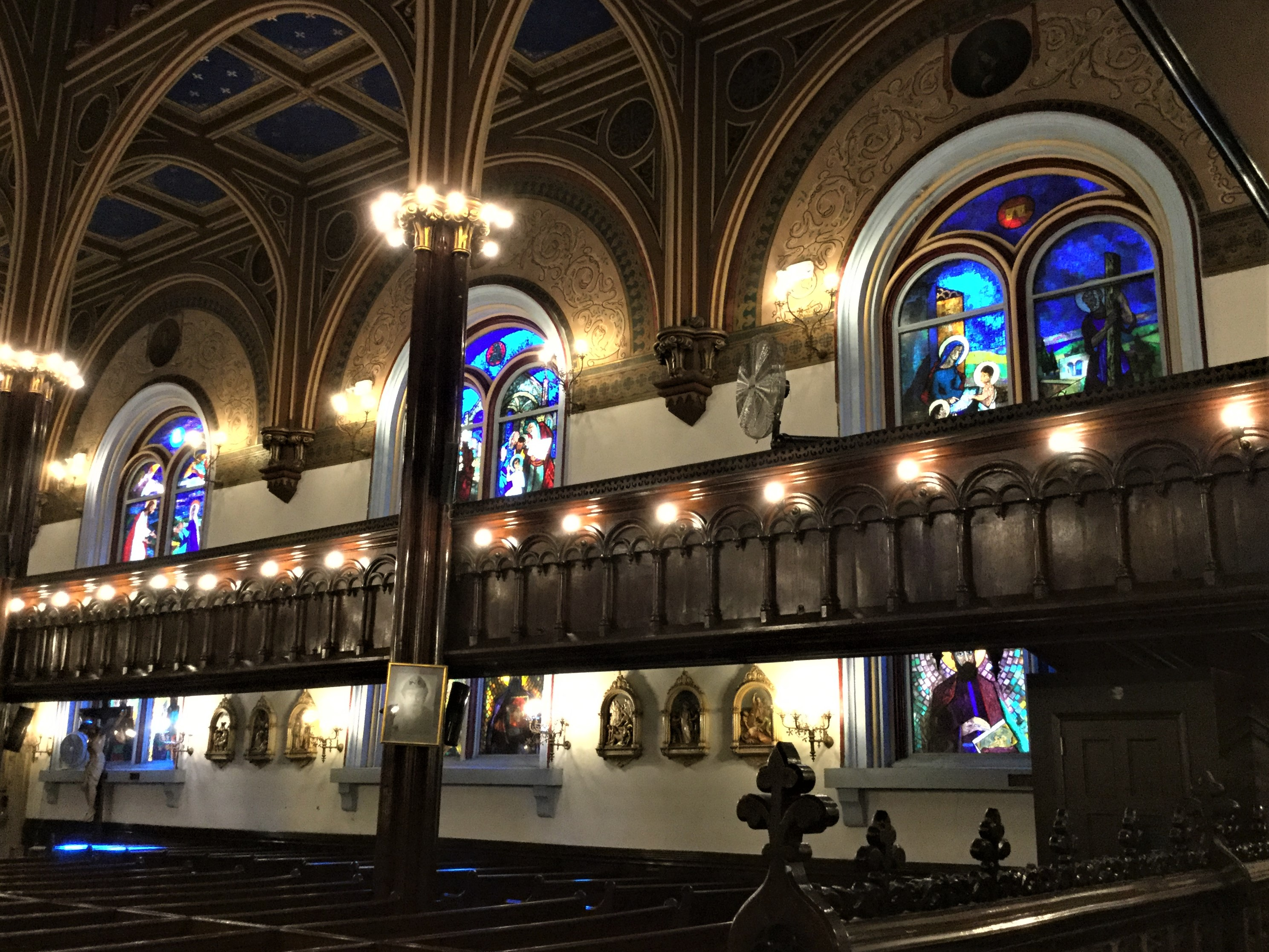
Stained Glass on the right side of the cathedral

== See also ==
- List of cathedrals in New York
- List of Catholic cathedrals in the United States
- List of cathedrals in the United States
