= Catholic Near East Welfare Association =

Non-profit organization

- Abbreviation: CNEWA
- Established: 11 March 1926
- Type: 501(c)(3) nonprofit charity
- Status: Active
- Headquarters: New York City
- President: Msgr. Peter Vaccari
- Board Chair: Most Rev. Ronald A. Hicks
- Revenue: $28,775,665 (2024)
- Website: cnewa.org

The Catholic Near East Welfare Association (abbreviated CNEWA, pronounced "k-NAY-wah" /kneɪwɑː/) is a papal agency established in 1926 and dedicated to giving pastoral and humanitarian support to Northeast Africa, the Middle East, Eastern Europe, and India. CNEWA operates specifically in areas of concentrated mass poverty, war, and displacement, providing human dignity and addressing basic needs for vulnerable populations. As a Catholic organization CNEWA utilizes the network of Eastern Catholic Churches and devoted religious sisters to provide the most effective and holistic humanitarian support regardless of creed or religious affiliation. As sisters with CNEWA have stated, "We don't help people because they're Christian. We help [them] because we are."

CNEWA's regional offices employ locals who collaborate with local churches and Christian institutions to identify needs and implement solutions as a means of 'working from the ground up.' CNEWA has held a presence in areas that have been recently volatile, such as Syria, Iraq and Palestine, and its operations respond rapidly to the constantly-shifting needs of the people. CNEWA provides 86.9% of its funds raised for programmatic support.

In June 2011, Monsignor John E. Kozar was appointed President of CNEWA and the Pontifical Mission for Palestine by Archbishop Timothy Michael Dolan, the President of the United States Conference of Catholic Bishops and Archbishop of the Archdiocese of New York. The appointment was confirmed by Pope Benedict XVI in September 2011. Kozar retired in June 2020 and was succeeded by Msgr. Peter Vaccari, as president of CNEWA/PMP. The headquarters of CNEWA are in New York City. In summer 2023, CNEWA reopened its office in Rome in the building that houses the Dicastery for the Eastern Churches.

== History ==
=== Early years ===
In the wake of the destruction of World War I, Pope Benedict XV and later Pope Pius XI, recognized the need for spiritual and material aid across Europe. This push for relief was specifically oriented towards Russia and Eastern Europe as they experienced a series of famines between 1921 and 1923.

In 1924, a dynamic Irish chaplain who had served British troops during World War I, Monsignor Richard Barry-Doyle arrived in New York at the behest of Father Paul Wattson, a Franciscan Friar of the Atonement, who enlisted the priest to raise funds for the humanitarian activities of Greek Catholic Bishop George Calavassy, the apostolic exarch in Constantinople.

In 1926, Pope Pius XI united Catholic organizations working in the region under the "Catholic Near East Welfare Association," centralizing and strengthening Catholic relief. Rather than being specifically oriented to Russia, the organization rapidly expanded to cover the entirety of what was then known as the "Near East."

=== Pontifical Mission for Palestine ===
Pope Pius XII in 1949, in the aftermath of the 1948 Arab–Israeli War, formed the Pontifical Mission for Palestine to focus relief efforts in Palestine, under the administration of CNEWA. Temporary emergency operations continued as the region only further destabilized, while CNEWA expanded to Lebanon and Iraq in response to their own respective national crises. The Pontifical Mission commemorated 75 years of this mission in April 2024.

=== Present Day ===
In 2020 Monsignor Peter I. Vaccari was appointed by Cardinal Timothy M. Dolan of New York, then Chair and Treasurer of the Board of Trustees of CNEWA/PMP, as the president of CNEWA and the Pontifical Mission for Palestine (PMP), succeeding Msgr. John E. Kozar.

Prior to this nomination and election, Msgr. Vaccari served as rector of St. Joseph Seminary in Dunwoodie, New York. Since being ordained as a priest in 1977 he has served as a parish priest, seminary professor, chaplain with the Air Force Reserve, and rector of the seminary of the Immaculate Conception in Huntington, Long Island.

== Mission ==
CNEWA's mission states that it exists to "build up the church, affirm human dignity, alleviate poverty, encourage dialogue — and inspire hope."

=== Accompanying the Church ===
CNEWA helps form church leadership by funding seminaries and religious houses of formation, university chaplaincies, lay catechist formation programs, advanced studies for clergy and religious leaders, and scholarships for priests and religious leaders. CNEWA also aids local churches by repairing damaged parish facilities, funding local church assistance programs, funding pastoral initiatives for refugees, and by funding youth formation programs.

=== Responding to human needs ===
Throughout the numerous different areas that CNEWA works, there are some common needs that CNEWA repeatedly addresses. For example, child care initiatives such as schools, orphanages, food programs, centers for children with special needs, and child health care practices are funded by CNEWA's programs. CNEWA also helps care for the marginalized in society by funding hospice programs, programs for refugees and immigrants, and initiatives for the elderly, abandoned, and neglected. CNEWA helps provide emergency relief, such as food packages, bedding, first aid, and sanitary kits for areas impacted by warfare, social upheaval, or natural disaster. Lastly, CNEWA helps fund sustainability programs that are geared towards helping society in the long-term, such as vocational training schools or programs, entrepreneurial initiatives, and self-reliance initiatives.

== Pontifical Mission for Palestine ==
=== History ===
The Pontifical Mission for Palestine is a special agency of the Holy See, founded by Pope Pius XII in June 1949 to assist Palestinian refugees. The founding president of the Mission was Monsignor Thomas McMahon.

The Mission became the Holy See's relief and development agency for Israel, the Gaza Strip, the West Bank, Jordan, Iraq, Lebanon and Syria. The Mission is administered by CNEWA, whose headquarters are in New York City. The Mission also has an office in Vatican City and field offices in Beirut, Jerusalem, and Amman.

On July 16, 1974, Paul VI sent a letter to the President of the Pontifical Mission for Palestine, Monsignor John G. Nolan, in which he referred for the first time to the Palestinians, stating:

The work of the Mission for Palestine has been one of the clearest signs of the Holy See's concern for the welfare of the Palestinians, who are particularly dear to us because they are people of the Holy Land, because they include followers of Christ and because they have been and still are being so tragically tried. We express again our heartfelt sharing in their sufferings and our support for their legitimate aspirations. May our paternal solicitude bring comfort and encouragement, especially to the refugees, who for years have been living under inhuman conditions.

Unfortunately such a state of affairs has produced in many Palestinians a sense of frustration and, in some, such anguish and desperation as to move them to acts of violent protest which with sorrow we have been constrained strenuously to deplore. It seems to us, nevertheless, that this is the moment for all Palestinians to look to the future with a constructive, like-minded and responsible attitude, as the hope becomes ever stronger that their particular problems will be them will be found during the peace in the Middle East.

As at 2006, the President of the Mission was Archimandrite Robert L. Stern, and the Vice President was Chorbishop John D. Faris.

== Areas ==
=== Middle East ===
CNEWA has offices in Beirut, Lebanon, Amman, Jordan, and in Jerusalem which oversee work in Lebanon, Jordan, Israel-Palestine, Egypt, Iraq, and Syria. CNEWA works with local churches and religious sisters to deliver the most effective on the ground support, delivering a total of $36,568,166 to the region.

=== Northeast Africa ===
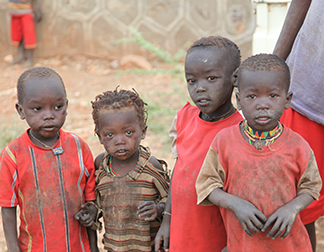
A group of small children stand together in a village in Ethiopia.

CNEWA works across Egypt and the horn of Africa. CNEWA has an active role in providing aid during droughts and bad harvests, as well as mudslides, and has led efforts in the educational field in Ethiopia and beyond. CNEWA's office in Beirut leads its initiatives in Egypt while its office in Addis Ababa leads initiatives throughout the Horn of Africa.

=== India ===
CNEWA has been a leading nonprofit across India with its office based out of Ernakulum providing basic necessities to those in need such as food, clothing, education and healthcare. At the same time, CNEWA works to train seminarians and novices to lead the spiritual community.

=== Eastern Europe ===
CNEWA supports programs throughout Ukraine, Georgia, Armenia and Romania, caring for the marginalized and revitalizing their spirit. The agency's focus within this region tends to be on abandoned elderly populations and seminarian formation. In 2022, CNEWA provided €0.9 million for Caritas Ukraine, a Ukrainian Catholic not-for-profit and humanitarian relief organisation. As of February 2024, CNEWA allocated $5.8 million in emergency funds over the past year to support church-led relief efforts in Ukraine and neighboring countries accommodating individuals displaced by the conflict.

== Publications ==
=== ONE Magazine ===
CNEWA's official publication is ONE Magazine. Its primary focus is to cover current events affecting the Eastern Catholic Churches, report on humanitarian issues, facilitate interreligious dialogue, and offer inspirational messages from church leaders. It is published quarterly in both print and digital formats. ONE Magazine is CNEWA's primary educational tool and has been in publication since 1974, when it was originally called CNEWA World. In 2004, the magazine was renamed ONE Magazine to reflect unity among citizens of the world and believers in Jesus Christ.

ONE Magazine and its contributors have been recipients of numerous Catholic Media Association awards for journalism, photography, layout, and more.

== Further references ==
- "Catholic Near East Welfare Association (CNEWA)". Charity Navigator.
- "CNEWA". Archdiocese of New York. eCatholic. 5 April 2016.
- "Regional Overview". Syria Regional Refugee Response.
- Gallagher, Tom (31 July 2014). "CNEWA launches appeal to aid fleeing Iraqi Christian families". National Catholic Reporter. National Catholic Reporter Publishing Company.
