= John George Chedid =

- Eparch of Our Lady of Lebanon of Los Angeles
- Native name: جون جورج شديد
- Church: Maronite Church
- Diocese: Maronite Catholic Eparchy of Our Lady of Lebanon of Los Angeles
- In office: 19 February 1994 – 20 November 2000
- Predecessor: Eparchy erected
- Successor: Robert Joseph Shaheen
- Previous posts: Titular Bishop of Callinicum dei Maroniti (1980-1994); Auxiliary Bishop of Saint Maron of Brooklyn (1980-1994)

Orders
- Ordination: 21 December 1951 by Pietro Fumasoni Biondi
- Consecration: 25 January 1981 by Anthony Peter Khoraish

Personal details
- Born: July 4, 1923 Edde, Mandatory Greater Lebanon
- Died: March 21, 2012 (aged 88)

John George Chedid (Arabic: جون جورج شديد) (July 4, 1923, in Edde, Lebanon – March 21, 2012) was a Lebanese-born American Maronite hierarch. He served as the first Bishop of the Maronite Catholic Eparchy of Our Lady of Lebanon of Los Angeles from 1994 until his retirement in 2000.

== Life ==
Born in Lebanon, John Chedid received after ten years of study in Rome on 21 December 1951 his priestly ordination of the Apostolic Exarchate of the United States of America. On September 1, 1955, he joined the succession of Thomas Aiken as pastor of the parish of Our Lady of Mt. Lebanon in Los Angeles. In 1969 he was made Monsignor and named Honorary Chaplain to His Holiness. On November 12, 1978, he was ordained a Chorbishop.

Pope John Paul II appointed him on 13 October 1980 titular bishop of Callinicum dei Maroniti and ordered him to auxiliary bishop in the diocese of Saint Maroun of Brooklyn. Maronite Patriarch of Antioch, Anthony Peter Khoraish, ordained him on January 25, 1981, to the episcopate and his co-consecrators were Francis Mansour Zayek, Eparch of Saint Maron of Brooklyn, and Nasrallah Boutros Sfeir, Auxiliary Bishop of Antioch.

Chedid was ordained as the first Bishop of the Maronite Catholic Eparchy of Our Lady of Lebanon of Los Angeles at the Our Lady of Lebanon Cathedral in Los Angeles, California, on February 19, 1994, by Archbishop Francis Mansour Zayek. He served until he reached the mandatory retirement age of 80. His resignation due to age was accepted by Pope John Paul II on November 20, 2000, and he was succeeded by the second bishop, Robert Joseph Shaheen.

Bishop John George Chedid died on March 21, 2012, at the age of 88.
