= John E. Kozar =

Roman catholic priest

Monsignor John E. Kozar is a priest of the Roman Catholic Diocese of Pittsburgh. From 2011 to 2020 he served as president of the Catholic Near East Welfare Association.

John Kozar grew up in Pittsburgh where he studied Croatian, in order to honor his family heritage, as well as Italian and Spanish. Kozar studied at Saint Meinrad Seminary and School of Theology in Indiana and St. Mary's Seminary and University in Baltimore and was ordained as a priest on May 1st, 1971.

Then-Father Kozar served as an associate pastor at various parishes in the Diocese of Pittsburgh. From 1978 to 2001, he served as diocesan development director, making yearly pastoral visits to the diocesan mission in Chimbote, Peru. He also worked 1987-2001 as pilgrimage director for the diocese, 1995-97 as vicar for clergy, 1995-2001 as diocesan director of the Pontifical Mission Societies and 1997-2001 as director of the diocesan Jubilee Office, while simultaneously serving as pastor of several parishes.

Named national director of the Pontifical Mission Societies in January 2001, he acquired responsibility for the national offices of the Society for the Propagation of the Faith, the Society of St. Peter Apostle and the Missionary Union of Priests and Religious; he added responsibility for the Holy Childhood Association later that year. He was named Chaplain to His Holiness in December 2003, and so holds the title "Monsignor." As successor to Archbishop Fulton Fulton J. Sheen at the Society for the Propagation of the Faith, Kozar played a supporting role in the introduction of Sheen's cause for canonization in 2004.

Effective September 15, 2011, he became president of the Catholic Near East Welfare Association. In that capacity, he has overseen the Catholic Church's aid to Christians in the Indian subcontinent, the Near East and Middle East. His term has coincided with much of what has been termed the "Arab Spring," a time of special political sensitivity for Christians living in North Africa and the Middle East. Since then, Kozar's work with the CNEWA has necessitated increased effort at remedying the persecution of Christian and other minorities occasioned especially by conflicts in Syria and Iraq.

In 2019, the Catholic Press Association gave Monsignor Kozar its highest honor, the Bishop John England Award, for his storytelling and photojournalism on behalf of the world's neediest and most vulnerable persons.
