= Abdallah Elias Zaidan =

Eparch of the Maronite Catholic Eparchy of Our Lady of Lebanon of Los Angeles

His Grace, The Most Reverend Abdallah Elias Zaidan LM
- Eparch of Our Lady of Lebanon of Los Angeles
- Church: Syriac Maronite Church
- Diocese: Maronite Catholic Eparchy of Our Lady of Lebanon of Los Angeles
- Appointed: July 10, 2013
- Installed: September 28, 2013
- Predecessor: Robert Joseph Shaheen

Orders
- Ordination: July 20, 1986 by Nasrallah Boutros Sfeir
- Consecration: September 28, 2013 by Bechara Boutros al-Rahi, Robert Joseph Shaheen and Camille Zaidan

Personal details
- Born: March 10, 1963 (age 63) Kosaybé, Lebanon
- Motto: Thy will be done

Styles of Abdallah Elias Zaidan
- Reference style: His Grace; The Most Reverend
- Spoken style: His Grace
- Religious style: Eparch

Abdallah Elias Zaidan, LM (Arabic: الياس عبدالله زيدان) born on March 10, 1963) is a Lebanese Catholic prelate who has served as the Maronite Eparch of Our Lady of Lebanon of Los Angeles since 2013. He is a member of the Kreimists.

== Early life and Priesthood ==
Abdallah Elias Zaidan was born in Kosaybé, Lebanon. He professed perpetual vows as a member of the Congregation of Maronite Lebanese Missionaries on September 26, 1984, and was ordained a priest on July 20, 1986.

As a priest Zaidan served as a school administrator and as a pastor of several parishes, including as rector of Our Lady of Mt. Lebanon-St. Peter Cathedral. He speaks Arabic, English, French, and Spanish.

== Eparch of Our Lady of Lebanon of Los Angeles ==
Pope Francis named Zaidan the Eparch of Our Lady of Lebanon of Los Angeles on July 10, 2013. He was ordained a bishop on September 28, 2013, by Cardinal Bechara Boutros al-Rahi, O.M.M., the Patriarch of Antioch. Eparch-Emeritus Robert Joseph Shaheen and Archeparch Camille Zaidan of the Maronite Catholic Archeparchy of Antelias in Lebanon were the co-consecrators.

== See also ==
- Catholic Church hierarchy
- Catholic Church in the United States
- Historical list of the Catholic bishops of the United States
- List of Catholic bishops of the United States
- Lists of patriarchs, archbishops, and bishops

== Episcopal succession ==
Catholic Church titles
Preceded by Robert Joseph Shaheen	Eparch of Our Lady of Lebanon of Los Angeles; 2013-Present	Succeeded by Incumbent
