= Stephen Youssef Doueihi =

Lebanese Maronite bishop in the US

Most Reverend Stephen Hector Y. Doueihi
- Bishop of St. Maron of Brooklyn
- Church: Maronite Church
- Appointed: November 11, 1996
- Term ended: January 10, 2004
- Predecessor: Francis Mansour Zayek
- Successor: Gregory John Mansour

Orders
- Ordination: August 14, 1955
- Consecration: January 11, 1997 by Nasrallah Boutros Sfeir

Personal details
- Born: June 25, 1927 Zgharta, Greater Lebanon
- Died: December 17, 2014 (aged 87) New York, New York

Stephen Hector Youssef Doueihi (born June 25, 1927 in Zgharta, Greater Lebanon, Lebanon - died on December 17, 2014) was a bishop of the Maronite Church in the United States. He served as the eparch (bishop) of the Maronite Catholic Eparchy of Saint Maron of Brooklyn from 1997 to 2004.

== Biography ==
Born in Zgharta, Lebanon, Doueihi was ordained priest on August 14, 1955 to the Maronite Catholic Eparchy of Batroun. In 1972 Doueihi incardinated himself in the Maronite Catholic Eparchy of Saint Maron of Brooklyn. Pope John Paul II named him as the Bishop of Saint Maron of Brooklyn on November 11, 1996. He was ordained a bishop by Cardinal Nasrallah Boutros Sfeir, Maronite Patriarch of Antioch, on January 11, 1997. The principal co-consecrators were Bishop Emeritus Francis Zayek of Brooklyn and Archeparch Joseph Mohsen Béchara of Antelias. Doueihi served as the eparch until his resignation was accepted by Pope John Paul II on January 10, 2004. He died on December 17, 2014.
