= Gregory John Mansour =

Current eparch of the Maronite Catholic Eparchy of Saint Maron of Brooklyn (born 1955)

His Grace, The Most Reverend Gregory John Mansour
- Eparch of Saint Maron of Brooklyn
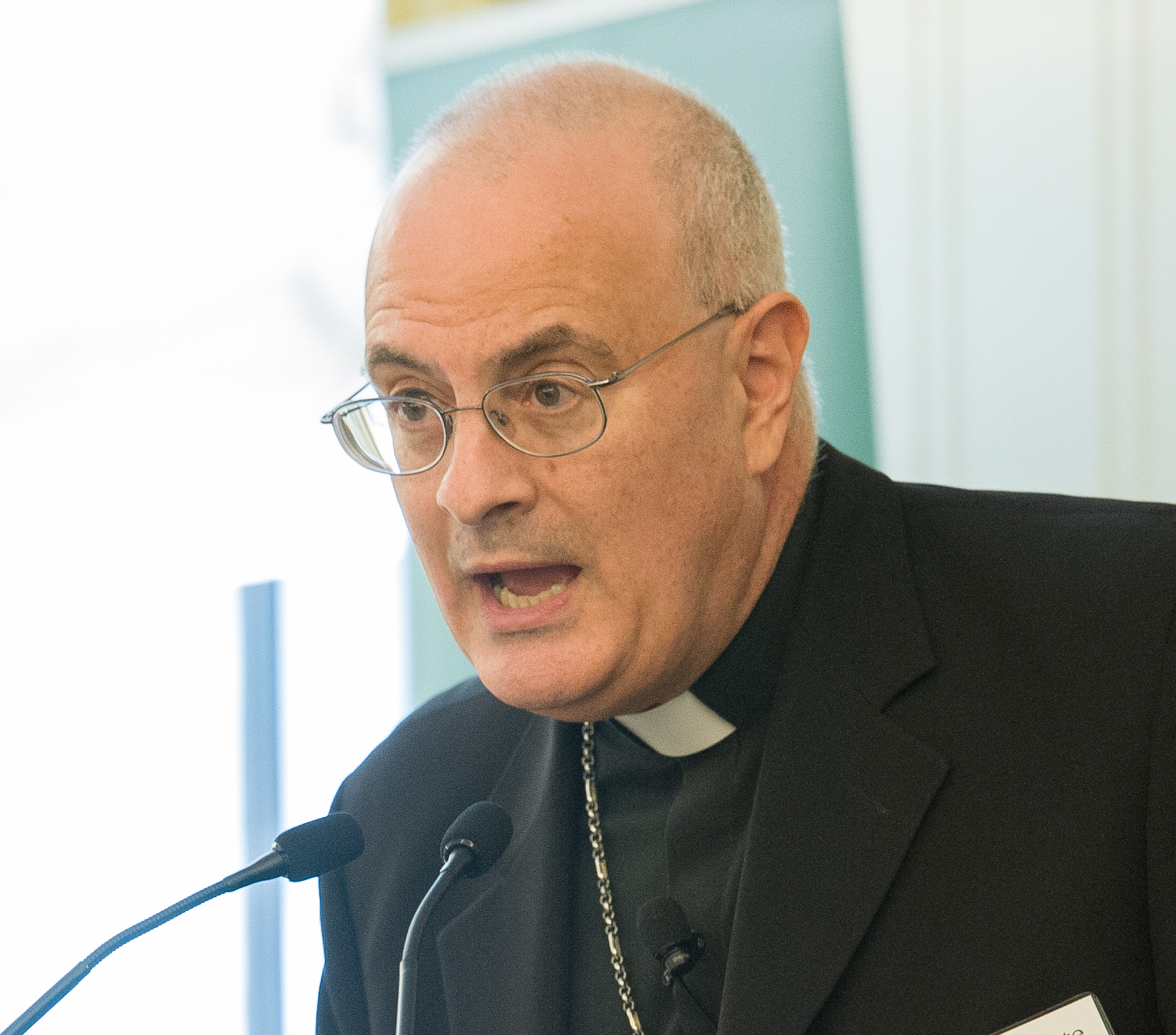
- Bishop Mansour speaks at Hudson Institute about the Islamic State's Religious Cleansing and the Urgency of a Strategic Response
- Church: Maronite Church
- Diocese: Maronite Catholic Eparchy of Saint Maron of Brooklyn
- Appointed: January 10, 2004
- Installed: April 27, 2004
- Predecessor: Stephen Youssef Doueihi

Orders
- Ordination: September 18, 1982 by John George Chedid
- Consecration: April 27, 2004 by Nasrallah Boutros Sfeir, Roland Aboujaoudé, and Stephen Youssef Doueihi

Personal details
- Born: November 11, 1955 (age 70) Flint, Michigan
- Denomination: Eastern Catholicism
- Motto: No greater love

Styles of Gregory John Mansour
- Reference style: His Grace; The Most Reverend
- Spoken style: His Grace
- Religious style: Eparch

Gregory John Mansour (born November 11, 1955, in Flint, Michigan) is an American Maronite prelate, who has served as the eparch (bishop) of the Maronite Eparchy of Saint Maron of Brooklyn, a diocese based in Brooklyn, New York, covering the Maronite Church in the eastern United States, since 2004.

== Life ==
Gregory Mansour was ordained priest on 18 September 1982 to the Maronite Catholic Eparchy of Saint Maron of Brooklyn. After its split on February 19, 1994, he was incardinated into the newly established Maronite Catholic Eparchy of Our Lady of Lebanon of Los Angeles.

On 10 January 2004 Mansour was appointed to the office of the Eparchy of Brooklyn succeeding Bishop Stephen Youssef Doueihi who retired., being ordained eparch on March 2, 2004, by Maronite Patriarch of Antioch, Cardinal Nasrallah Boutros Sfeir, ruler of the Maronite Church and his co-consecrators were Roland Aboujaoudé, titular bishop of Arca in Phoenicia of the Maronites and Stephen Youssef Doueihi, emeritus bishop of the Eparchy of Brooklyn. On April 27, 2004, Mansour was installed as eparch of Brooklyn.

Bishop Mansour was appointed chairman of Catholic Relief Services' board of directors on 22 November 2016, succeeding Archbishop of Oklahoma City Paul S. Coakley in the position. Mansour had previously travelled to Lebanon and Jordan to review CRS efforts to help refugees of the Syrian Civil War, as well as El Salvador and Egypt on behalf of CRS.

== See also ==
- Catholic Church hierarchy
- Catholic Church in the United States
- Historical list of the Catholic bishops of the United States
- List of Catholic bishops of the United States
- Lists of patriarchs, archbishops, and bishops
- Maronite Catholic Eparchy of Our Lady of Lebanon of Los Angeles (in St. Louis, Mo.; covering the central and western U.S.)

== Episcopal succession ==
Catholic Church titles
Preceded by Stephen Youssef Doueihi	Eparch of Saint Maron of Brooklyn; 2004-Present	Succeeded by Incumbent
