= Francis Mansour Zayek =

Maronite Catholic bishop

- (Arch)Eparch of Saint Maron of Brooklyn
- Native name: فرنسيس منصور الزايك
- Church: Maronite Church
- Diocese: Eparchy of Saint Maron of Brooklyn
- In office: 27 January 1966 – 11 November 1996
- Predecessor: Exarchate erected
- Successor: Stephen Youssef Doueihi
- Previous posts: Titular Eparch of Callinicum dei Maroniti (1962-1971); Auxiliary Eparch of Ordinariate for the Faithful of Eastern Rites in Brazil (1962-1966)

Orders
- Ordination: 17 March 1946 by Celso Benigno Luigi Costantini
- Consecration: 5 August 1962 by Paul Peter Meouchi

Personal details
- Born: 18 October 1920 Manzanillo, Oriente Province, Cuba
- Died: 14 September 2010 (aged 89) Ghazir, Mount Lebanon Governorate, Lebanon

Archbishop Francis Mansour Zayek (Arabic: فرنسيس منصور الزايك; born October 18, 1920, Manzanillo, Cuba – died on September 14, 2010) was a prelate of the Maronite Church. He was the founding eparch of the Maronite Catholic Eparchy of Saint Maron of Brooklyn, an Eastern Catholic diocese based in Brooklyn, New York, which covers the eastern coast of the United States.

== Biography ==
=== Early life ===
Zayek was born in Manzanillo, Cuba, one of the eight children of Mansour Zayek and Mariam Khoury, on October 18, 1920. The family moved from Cuba back to their homeland of Lebanon in 1931, then part of the French Mandate for Syria and the Lebanon and settled in their native city of Ghazir. Inspired by an uncle, Father George Zayek, the local pastor, he felt drawn to the priesthood. For much of his youth, he felt drawn to enter the Franciscan Order for service as a missionary to Asia.

Instead of that path, Zayek applied to the seminary of the Maronite Church in his hometown, with the approval of his local bishop, Elias Richa, the Archbishop of Baalbek. He excelled in his studies at the seminary, being fluent in Arabic as well as in French and Spanish (and later in Italian, Portuguese and English) and the archbishop decided to send him to Rome for further studies, where he continued to gain honors. He spent World War II studying at the Urban College, where he gained a diploma in philosophy. He later recounted the struggle the seminarians faced to find food in that period. After graduating, he was ordained a Maronite Catholic priest in the chapel of the College on March 17, 1946. Zayek became incardinated in Lebanon.

Zayek then earned doctorates in both theology and canon law at the Lateran University. After completing his studies, Zayek was sent to Cairo, Egypt, where he was appointed by Boutros Deeb, the Maronite Archbishop of Cairo, as Rector of the Maronite Cathedral of the Holy Family there, and a judge in the Catholic tribunals of the city. He also served as an assistant to the Papal Nuncio there. He later returned to Rome where he served as a judge of the Roman Rota and as a consultant in canon law at the Pontifical Atheneum of St. Anselm and at the Lateran University.

=== Bishop ===
==== Brazil ====
On May 30, 1962, Pope John XXIII appointed Zayek to head the Maronite Apostolic Exarchate (the equivalent in the Eastern Churches of a Vicariate Apostolic) for Maronites in Brazil, the first Maronite bishop to serve outside of the Middle East. He was consecrated bishop at a ceremony held in Dimane, Lebanon, on August 5, 1962, by Mar Paul Peter Meouchi, Maronite Patriarch of Antioch, and his co-consecrators were Peter Sfair, Ordinary Bishop for Maronites in Rome, and Abdallah Nujaim, Eparch of Baalbek. The pope, in appointing him, told him, “What you Maronites have does not pertain to you alone but is part of the treasure of the Catholic Church".

Officially an auxiliary bishop of the Roman Catholic Archdiocese of Rio de Janeiro, and titular bishop of Callinicum dei Maroniti, Zayek served as bishop for the Maronites of that country until 1966.

==== Second Vatican Council ====
Zayek was one of the last surviving bishops who had attended all four sessions of the Second Vatican Council between 1962 and 1965 as a bishop.

==== The United States ====
On January 27, 1966, the Venerable Pope Paul VI established a similar exarchate for the United States, and transferred Zayek to serve as its first exarch. He was installed in Detroit, the seat of the exarchate, on June 11, 1966. He arrived in the United States with just a rudimentary knowledge of English, and found an unfinished cathedral and neither a residence nor offices ready for him. As he had needed to do in Brazil, he worked to unify the Maronite Catholics of the country.

Zayek had to face many challenges. First was the very identity of the Church. Arguments raged as to whether it was to be a transplant of Lebanese life or an American institution rooted in its Lebanese heritage. In this he remained guided by the words of Pope John. Additionally, he had to deal with the liturgical changes mandated by the Vatican Council. He had the Maronite Divine Liturgy translated into English for the first time, creating a standardized service for use in every parish of the exarchate.

Pope Paul elevated the exarchate to a full eparchy, or diocese, on November 29, 1971, and appointed Zayek as the first bishop of the Eparchy of St. Maron of Detroit. Zayek was installed as its first bishop on June 4, 1972. The seat of the eparchy was moved from Detroit to the Church of St. Maron in Brooklyn on 27 June 1977 and renamed the Eparchy of St. Maron of Brooklyn.

To honor his years of service, Pope John Paul II promoted Zayek to the personal rank of archbishop on December 10, 1982. He retired on November 11, 1996, when he reached the mandatory retirement age of 75. He then moved to Fort Lauderdale, Florida, where he served at Our Lady of Lebanon Maronite Catholic Church in Miami, Florida.

==== Awards ====
Zayek was a member of the Maronite Patriarchal Synod and received the Ellis Island Medal of Honor.

=== Death ===
When Zayek's health began to falter in late 2009, he returned to Lebanon. He died on September 14, 2010, at the age of 89, and was buried there. He was survived by his sister, Lydia, a resident of Lebanon, and his brother, Elias, a resident of Brazil.

== Tribute ==
Eparch Gregory J. Mansour, a successor, wrote in reaction to Zayek's death, "The Maronite Church in the United States is deeply indebted to the archbishop for his zealous efforts in establishing the strong, vibrant Maronite community we have today...May Archbishop Zayek share in the glory of the Cross which we celebrate this day!"

== See also ==
- Maronite Catholic Eparchy of Our Lady of Lebanon of São Paulo
