= Maronite Catholic Eparchy of Saint Maron of Brooklyn =

Eastern Catholic ecclesiastical jurisdiction in the US

Eparchy of Saint Maron of Brooklyn (Maronite) Eparchia Sancti Maronis Bruklyniensis Maronitarum
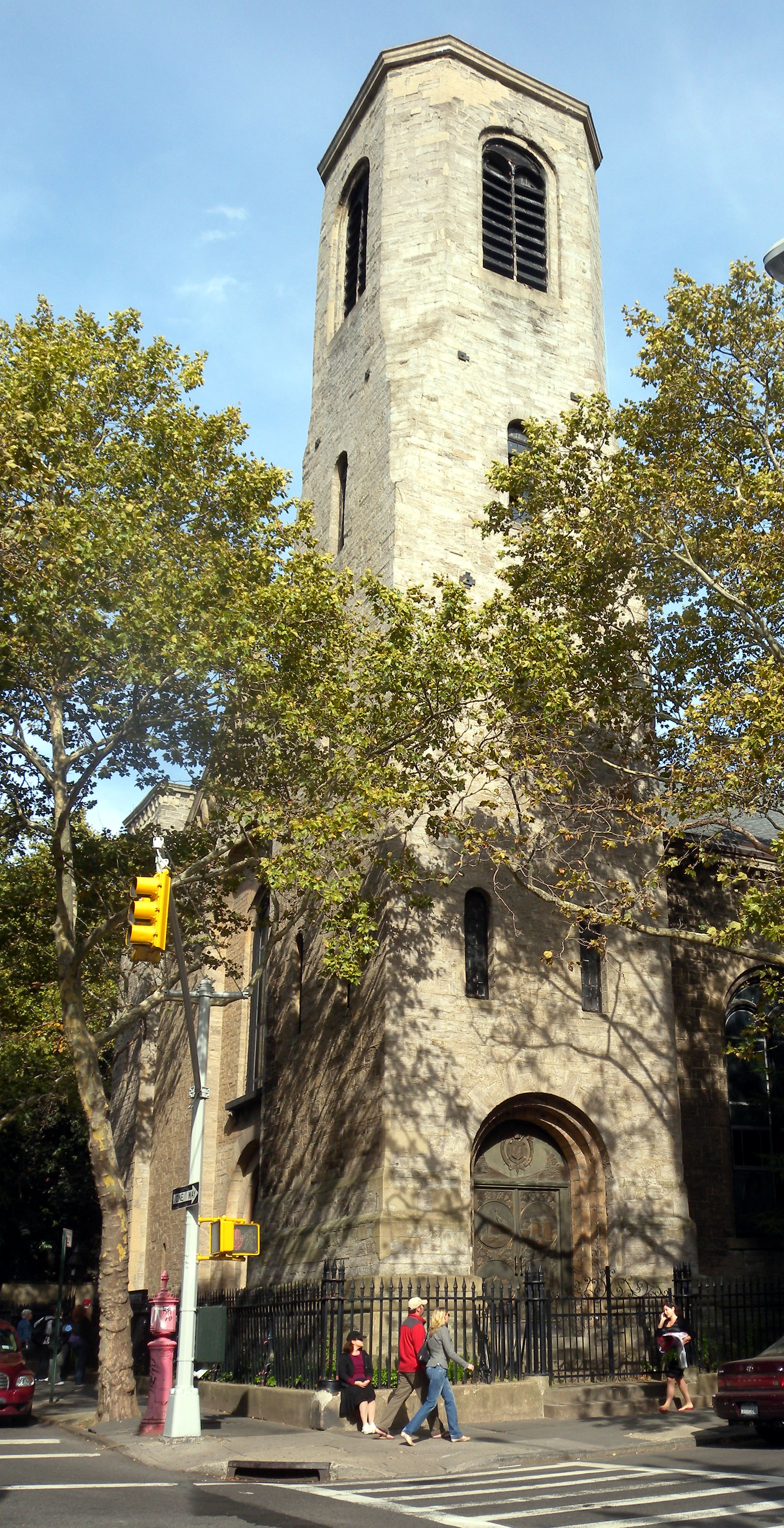
- Our Lady of Lebanon Cathedral

Location
- Country: United States
- Ecclesiastical province: Immediately Subject to the Holy See

Statistics
- Population: (as of 2017); 33,000
- Parishes: 34

Information
- Denomination: Catholic Church
- Sui iuris church: Maronite Church
- Rite: West Syro-Antiochene Rite
- Established: January 10, 1966 (60 years ago)
- Cathedral: Our Lady of Lebanon Cathedral

Current leadership
- Pope: Leo XIV
- Patriarch: Bechara Boutros al-Rahi
- Eparch: Gregory John Mansour
- Bishops emeritus: Stephen Youssef Doueihi

Map
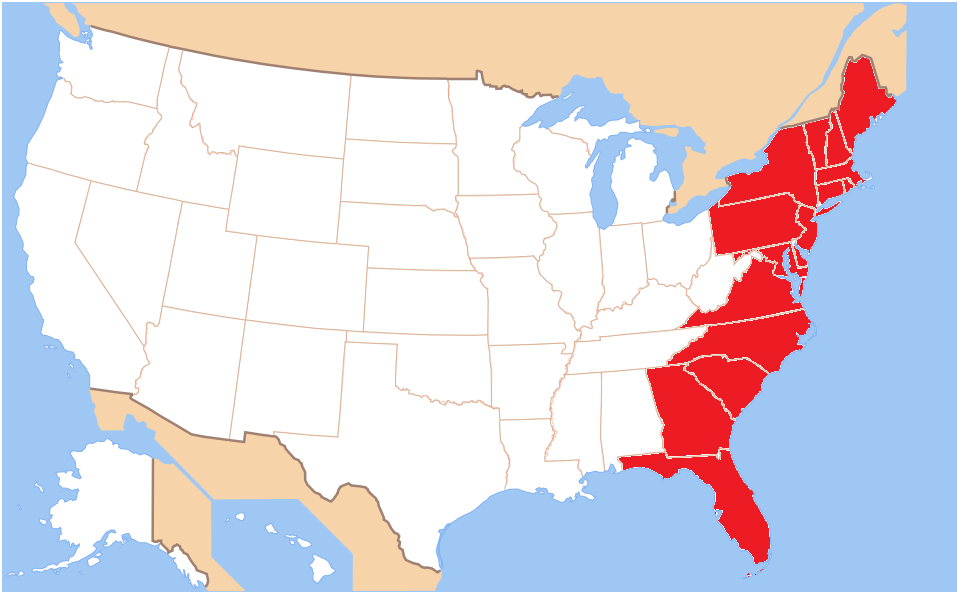

Website
- www.stmaron.org

The Eparchy of Saint Maron of Brooklyn (Latin: Eparchia Sancti Maronis Bruklyniensis Maronitarum) is a Antiochene Syriac Maronite Church eparchy of the Catholic Church headquartered in Brooklyn, New York, covering the East Coast of the United States. In conformity with the Code of Canons of the Eastern Churches (CCEO), the eparchy is under the direct jurisdiction of the Roman Pontiff. In 2017 there were 33,000 baptized members. It is led by eparch Gregory John Mansour.

== Territory and statistics ==
The eparchy includes the Maronite Catholic faithful in the eastern coast states of the United States.

It borders in the north with the Maronite Catholic Eparchy of Saint Maron of Montreal, which covers Canada, and to the west with the Maronite Catholic Eparchy of Our Lady of Lebanon of Los Angeles, which covers thirty-four states of the United States.

Its eparchial seat is the city of Brooklyn, where Our Lady of Lebanon Maronite Cathedral is located. The Saint Maron Maronite church in Detroit, dedicated to Saint Maron, is the former cathedral church of the eparchy.

The territory is divided into 34 parishes and in 2017 had 33,000 Lebanese Maronite Catholics.

== History ==
=== Foundation ===
The diocese has its roots in the establishment of a Maronite Apostolic Exarchate (the equivalent in the Eastern Churches of an Apostolic Vicariate) by Pope Paul VI's papal bull Cum supremi on 10 January 1966. Its object was to provide a unified structure to serve the Lebanese Maronite Catholics scattered around the country, who were subject, up to that point, to the local Roman Catholic diocese.

At that time, Pope Paul appointed Francis Mansour Zayek as the first exarch of the Maronites in the United States. The eparchate was based in Detroit, Michigan. Zayek, who had just spent several years in a similar post in Brazil, arrived in the United States with a rudimentary knowledge of English, only to find an unfinished cathedral and rectory. He took office on 27 January 1966.

Zayek had to face many challenges. First was the very identity of the church. Arguments raged as to whether it was to be a transplant of Lebanese life or an American institution rooted in its Lebanese heritage. In this he remained guided by the advice which Pope John had given him on his original appointment, "What you Maronites have does not pertain to you alone but is part of the treasure of the Catholic Church". Additionally, he had to deal with the liturgical changes mandated by the Second Vatican Council, in which he had participated. He had the Maronite Divine Liturgy translated into English for the first time, creating a standardized service for use in every parish of the exarchate.

=== Eparchy ===
In the Apostolic Constitution Quae spes, issued on 29 November 1971, Pope Paul VI elevated the exarchate to a full eparchy, or diocese, and appointed Zayek as the first bishop of the Eparchy of Saint Maron of Detroit. Zayek was installed as its first bishop on June 4, 1972. The seat of the eparchy was moved from Detroit to the Church of Saint Maron in Brooklyn on 27 June 1977 by the Congregation for the Oriental Churches and it also renamed the name of the Eparchy to Saint Maron of Brooklyn.

Zayek retired in 1996, with the personal title of Archbishop, and was succeeded by Bishop Stephen Youssef Doueihi, who himself retired on 10 January 2004 and was succeeded by Gregory J. Mansour.

A part of its territory, which previously encompassed the entire United States, was transferred on 19 March 1994 to the newly established Maronite Catholic Eparchy of Our Lady of Lebanon of Los Angeles by Pope John Paul II's papal bull Omnium Catholicorum.

== Parishes and missions ==
As of 2010, the eparchy counts 43 parishes, served by 51 priests and 17 deacons. Parishes are located in the following states:

- Connecticut (3)
  - St. Anthony Maronite Church: Danbury, CT
  - Our Lady of Lebanon Maronite Church: Waterbury, CT
  - St. Maron Maronite Church: Torrington, CT
- District of Columbia (1)
  - Our Lady of Lebanon Maronite Church: Washington, D.C.
- Florida (6)
  - Our Lady of Lebanon Maronite Church: Miami, FL
  - St. Jude Maronite Church: Orlando, FL
  - Mary Mother of the Light Maronite Mission: Tequesta, Florida
  - Saint Maron Maronite Mission: Jacksonville, FL
  - Heart of Jesus Maronite Church: Ft. Lauderdale, FL
  - Mission of Saints Peter and Paul: Tampa, FL
- Georgia (1)
  - St. Joseph Maronite Church: Atlanta, GA
- Maine (1)
  - St. Joseph Maronite Church: Waterville, ME
- Massachusetts (7)
  - St. Theresa Maronite Church: Brockton, MA
  - St. Anthony of the Desert Maronite Church: Fall River, MA
  - Our Lady of the Cedars Maronite Church: Jamaica Plain, MA
  - St. Anthony Maronite Church: Lawrence, MA
  - Our Lady of Purgatory Maronite Church: New Bedford, MA
  - St. Anthony Maronite Church: Springfield, MA
  - Our Lady of Mercy Maronite Church: Worcester, MA
- New Hampshire (1)
  - St. George Maronite Catholic Church: Dover, NH
- New Jersey (2)
  - St. Sharbel Maronite Church: Somerset, NJ
  - Our Lady Star of the East Maronite Catholic Mission: Pleasantville, NJ
- New York (6)
  - Our Lady of Lebanon Maronite Cathedral: Brooklyn, NY
  - Saint John Paul II Maronite Catholic Church: Sleepy Hollow, New York
  - St. Joseph Maronite Church Olean, NY
  - St. Ann Maronite Church: Watervliet, NY
  - St. Louis Gonzaga Maronite Church Utica, NY
  - St. John Maron Maronite Church: Williamsville, NY
- North Carolina (3)
  - St Michael the Archangel Maronite Church: Fayetteville, NC
  - Saint Sharbel Maronite Church Raleigh, NC
  - Saint Stephen Maronite Mission Waxhaw, NC
- Pennsylvania (9)
  - Our Lady of Lebanon Maronite Church: Easton, PA
  - Our Lady of Victory Maronite Church: Pittsburgh, PA
  - Blessed Teresa of Calcutta Maronite Mission: Darlington, PA
  - St. Ann Maronite Church: Scranton, PA
  - St. John the Baptist Maronite Church: New Castle, PA
  - St. George Maronite Church: Uniontown, PA
  - St. Anthony/St. George Maronite Church: Wilkes-Barre, PA
  - St. Maron Maronite Church: Philadelphia, PA
  - St. Sharbel Maronite Church: Newtown Square, PA
- Rhode Island (1)
  - St. George Maronite Church: Cranston, RI
- South Carolina (1)
  - Mission of St. Rafka: Greer, SC
- Virginia (2)
  - St. Anthony Maronite Church: Richmond, VA
  - St. Elias Maronite Church: Roanoke, VA
- West Virginia (1)
  - Our Lady of Lebanon Maronite Church: Wheeling, WV

== Bishops ==
=== Apostolic Exarch of the United States of America ===
- Francis Mansour Zayek (27 January 1966 - 29 November 1971)

=== Eparch of Saint Maron of Detroit ===
- Francis Mansour Zayek (November 29, 1971 - 27 June 1977)

=== Eparch of Saint Maron of Brooklyn ===
- Francis Mansour Zayek (June 27, 1977 - November 11, 1996 retired)
- Stephen Youssef Doueihi (November 11, 1996 - January 10, 2004 retired)
- Gregory John Mansour (January 10, 2004 – present)

=== Other priest of this eparchy who became bishop ===
- Peter Karam, appointed Curial Bishop of Antiochia {Antioch} (Maronite), Lebanon in 2019

== See also ==
- Maronite Catholic Eparchy of Our Lady of Lebanon of Los Angeles
- List of the Catholic bishops of the United States § Other Eastern Catholic bishops
