= Cathedral Basilica of Our Lady of Miracles, Caacupé =

Cathedral Basilica of Our Lady of Miracles
- Catedral Basílica Nuestra Señora de los Milagros
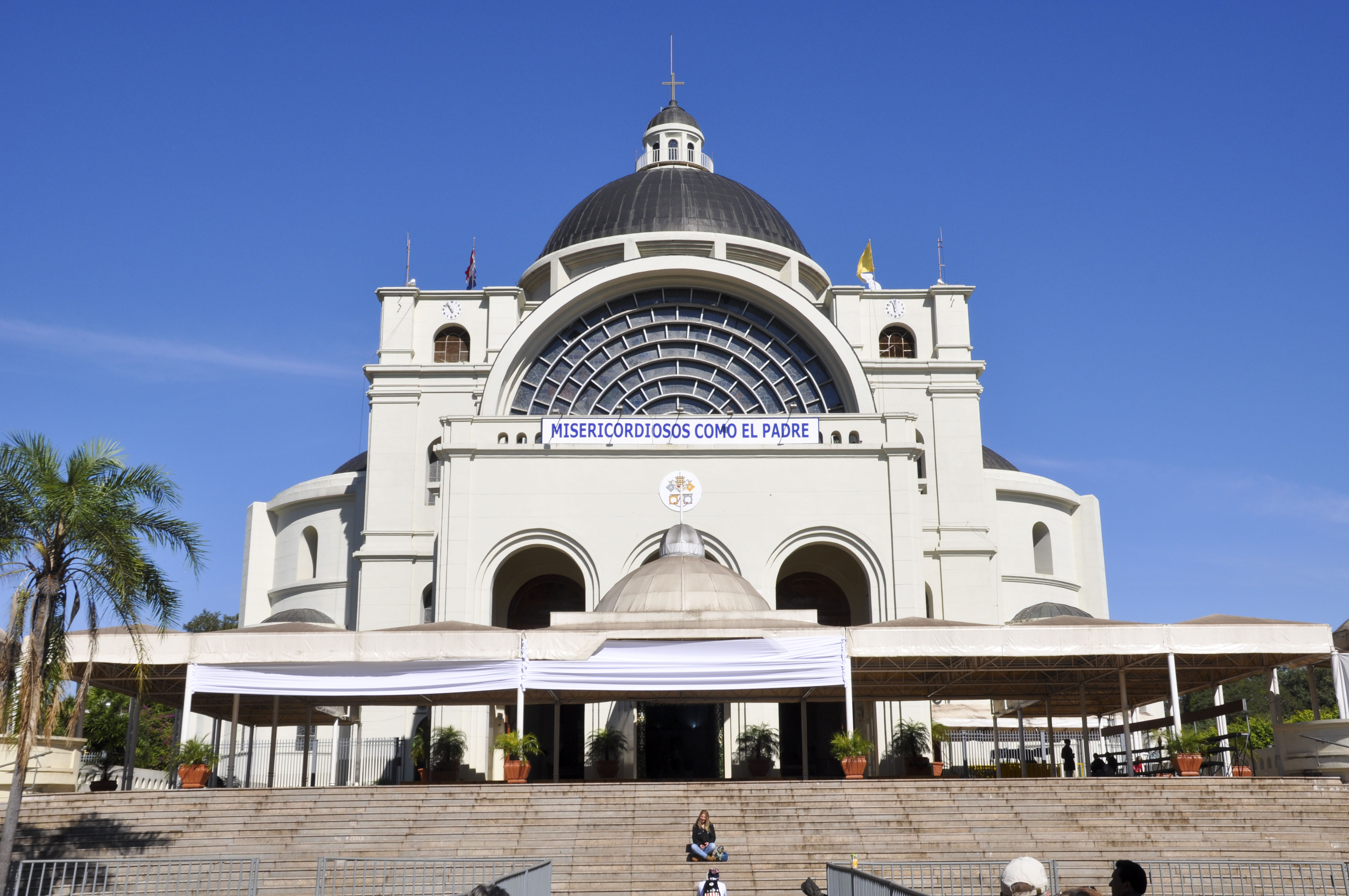
- Cathedral Basilica of Our Lady of Miracles
- 25.3861°S 57.1435°W
- Location: Caacupé
- Country: Paraguay
- Denomination: Roman Catholic Church
- Sui iuris church: Latin Church

History
- Status: Cathedral; Basilica
- Founded: 8 December 1765

Architecture
- Functional status: Active

Administration
- Archdiocese: Archdiocese of Asunción
- Diocese: Diocese of Caacupé

The Cathedral Basilica of Our Lady of Miracles (Spanish: Catedral Basílica Nuestra Señora de los Milagros), also Caacupé Cathedral, is the religious building that functions as the Catholic cathedral of the city of Caacupé, Paraguay, and also as the seat of the Roman Catholic Diocese of Caacupé that was created as a territorial prelature in 1960 and was promoted to its current status in 1967 through the bull Rerum catholicarum of Pope Paul VI.

The Sanctuary of the Virgin of Caacupé is a Catholic basilica in Paraguay that was inaugurated on 8 December 1765 and became a place of pilgrimage for many local believers. Caacupé is considered the spiritual capital of Paraguay because it houses the largest sanctuary in the country.

The temple, in addition to its status as a cathedral, is considered as a Catholic national sanctuary and minor basilica. It is under the pastoral responsibility of Bishop Ricardo Jorge Valenzuela Ríos. The church has been visited by two different popes: John Paul II in May 1988 and Francis in July 2015.

Our Lady of Caacupé is considered the Patroness of Paraguay. As one of the prominent devotions in the country, it was recognized by the Holy See through a canonical coronation on 8 December 1954, officiated by Cardinal Alfredo Pacini, Papal Legate of Pope Pius XII.

== See also ==
- Roman Catholicism in Paraguay
- Our Lady of Miracles

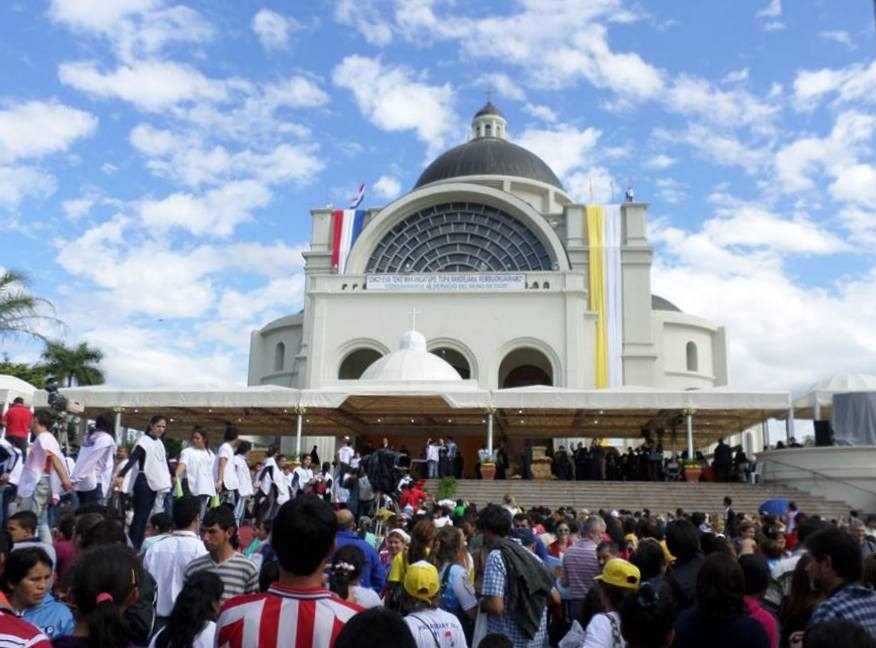
View of the cathedral during the visit of Pope Francis in 2015
