= Basilicas in the Catholic Church =

Ceremonial designation of church buildings

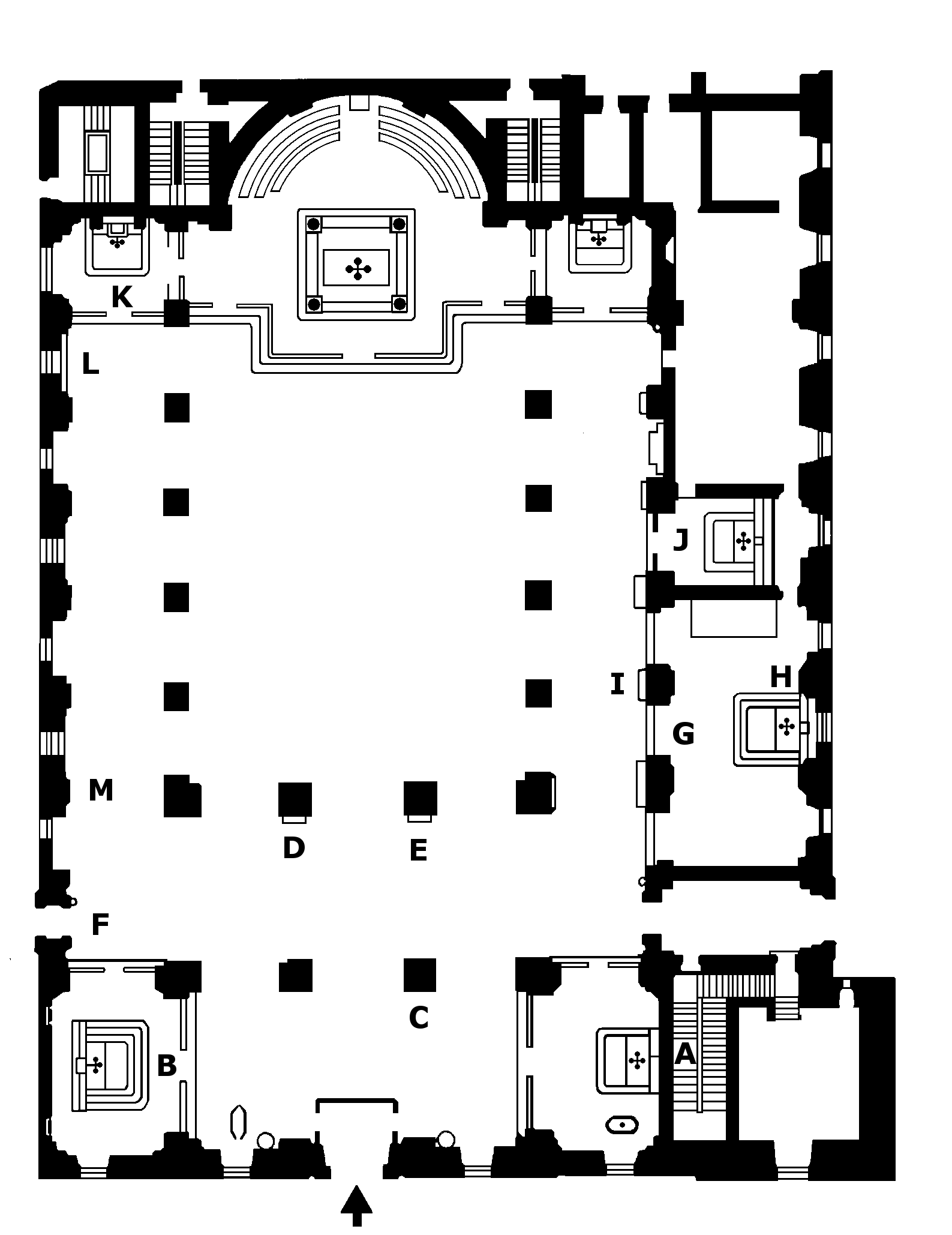
Floorplan of San Lorenzo in Damaso, a basilica in Rome. It is built in the basilica style: a rectangular building with a nave flanked by longitudinal aisles.

Basilicas are Catholic church buildings that have a designation, conferring special privileges, given by the pope. Basilicas are distinguished for ceremonial purposes from other churches. The building need not be a basilica in the architectural sense (a rectangular building with a central nave flanked by two or more longitudinal aisles). Basilicas are either major basilicas, of which there are four, all in the Diocese of Rome, or minor basilicas, of which there were 1,924 worldwide as of 2023.

Numerous basilicas are notable shrines, often receiving pilgrimages, especially among the many that were built above a confessio or the burial place of a martyr; although this term now usually designates a space before the high altar that is sunk lower than the main floor level (as in the case in St. Peter's and St. John Lateran in Rome) and that offer more immediate access to the burial places below. Some basilicas are Christian pilgrimage sites, receiving tens of millions of visitors per year.

Churches designated as papal basilicas, in particular, possess a papal throne and a papal high altar, at which no one may celebrate Mass without the pope's permission.

== Ranking of churches ==
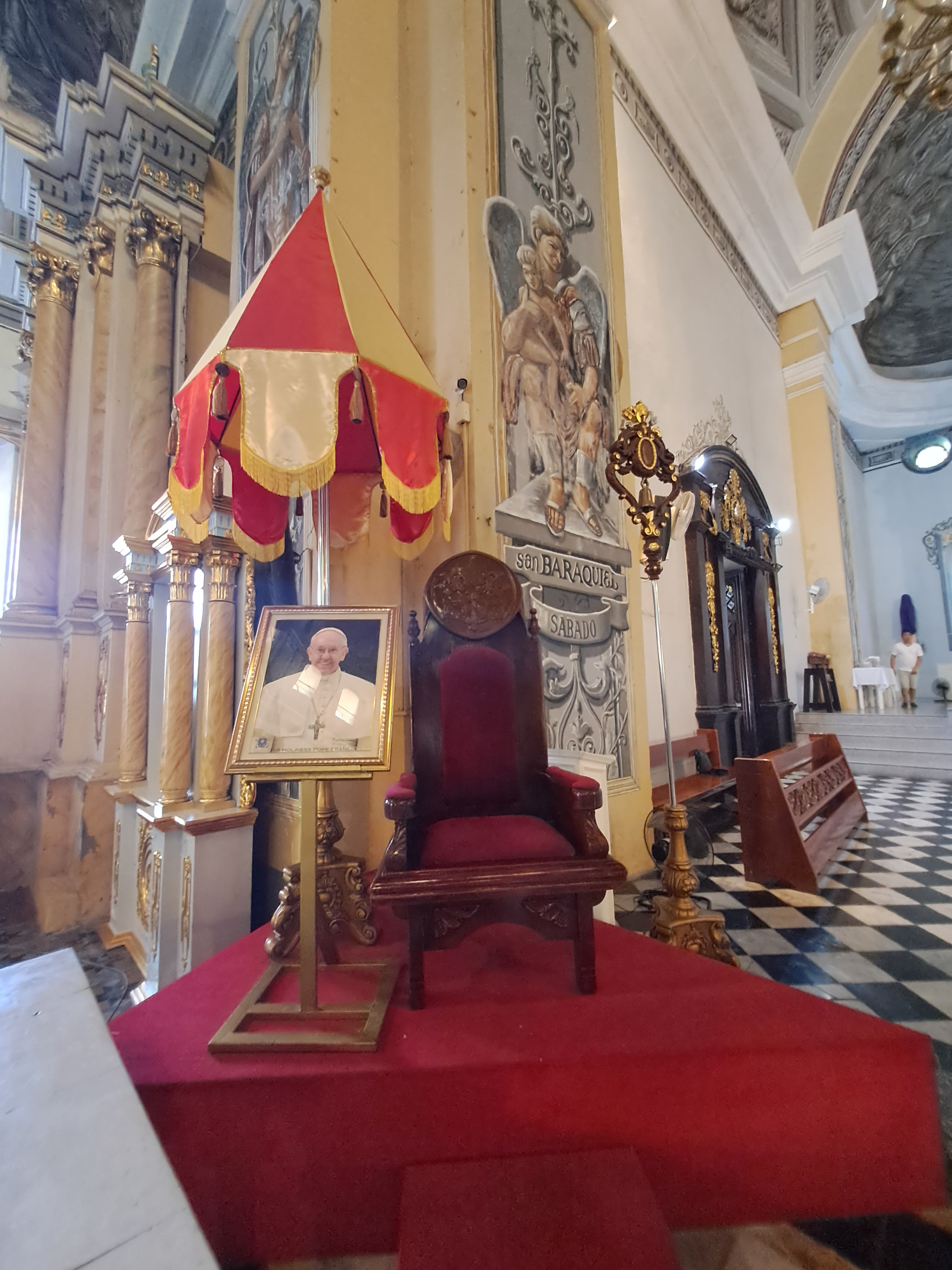
Conopaeum (left), tintinnabulum (right), and a papal chair (middle), one of the privileges granted to a basilica

The papal or major basilicas outrank in precedence all other churches. Other rankings put the cathedral (or co-cathedral) of a bishop ahead of all other churches in the same diocese, even if they have the title of minor basilica. If the cathedral is that of a suffragan diocese, it yields precedence to the cathedral of the metropolitan see. The cathedral of a primate is considered to rank higher than that of other metropolitan(s) in his circumscription (usually a present or historical state). Other classifications of churches include collegiate churches, which may or may not also be minor basilicas.

The distinction between major basilicas and minor basilicas appears to have arisen in the early 18th century. The earliest document that records the use of the term major basilica dates from 1727.

== Major and papal basilicas ==
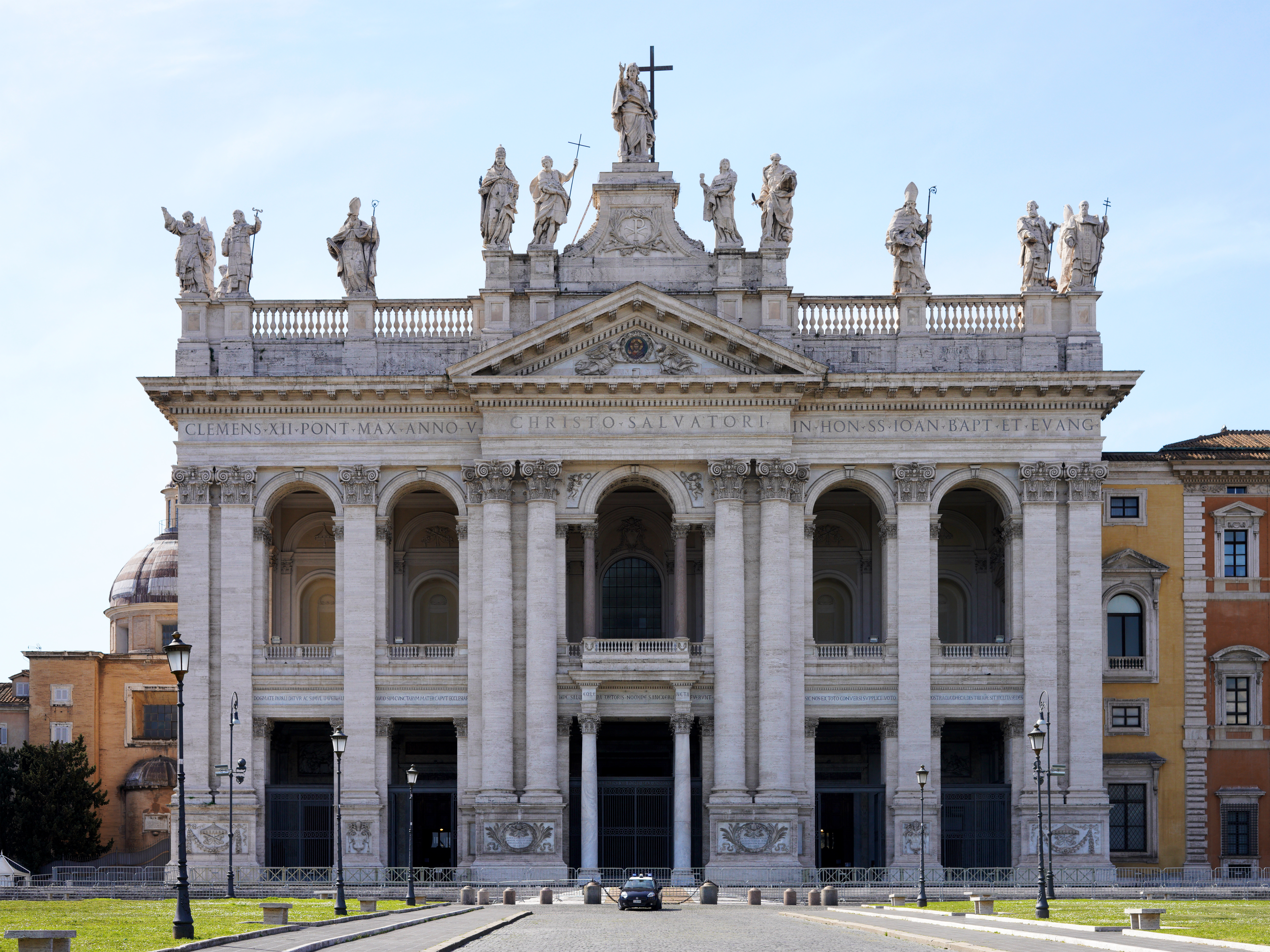
Archbasilica of St. John Lateran 41°53′09″N 12°30′22″E

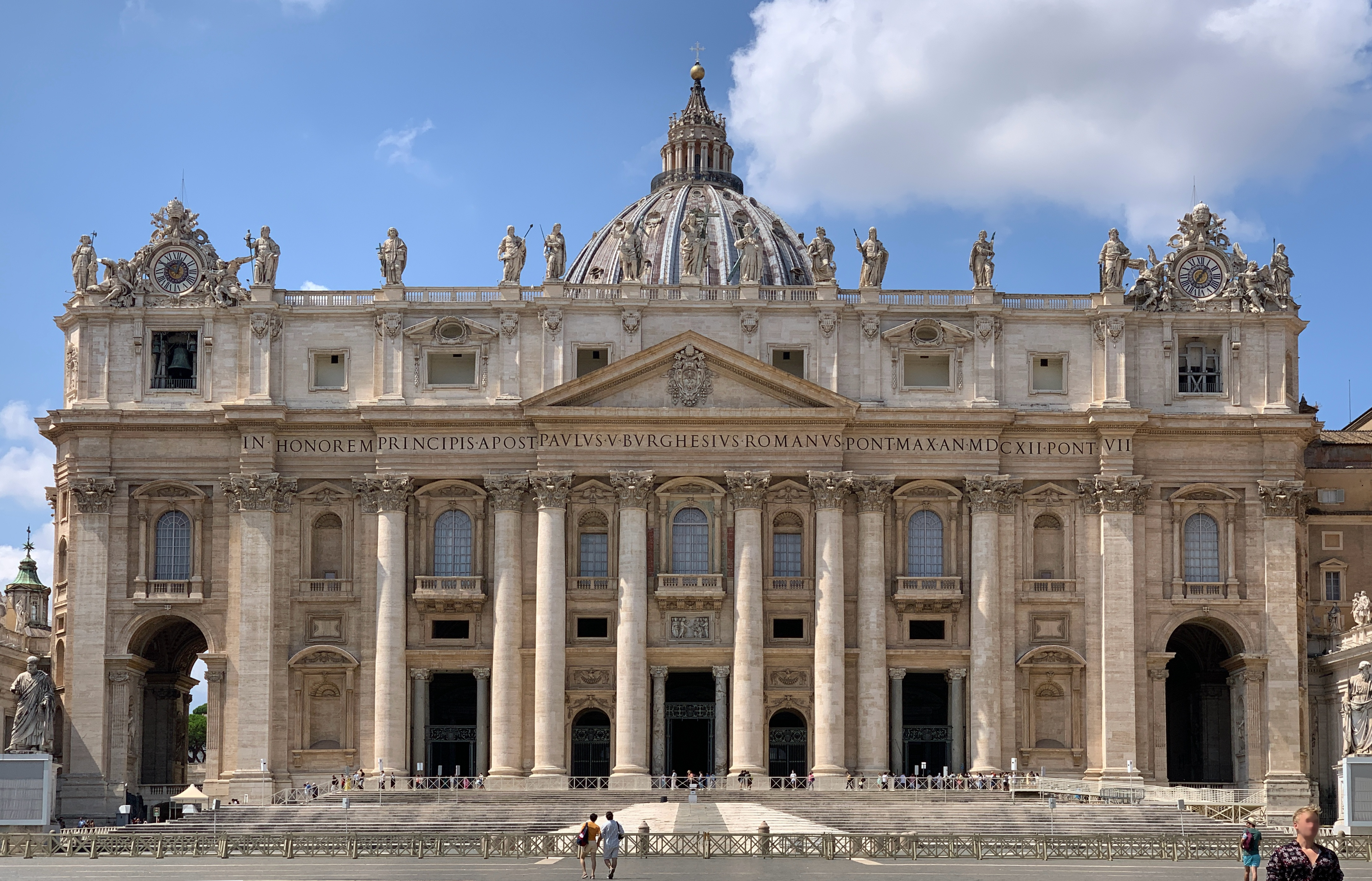
St. Peter's Basilica 41°54′8″N 12°27′12″E

=== Major basilicas ===
There are four major basilicas, all in Rome, which among other distinct features have holy doors and to which a visit is always prescribed as one of the conditions for gaining the Roman Jubilee. Only the major basilicas are prefixed with adjective sacrosancta (Ecclesiastical Latin for 'most holy').

- St. John Lateran, also called the Lateran Basilica. Since it is the cathedral of the Diocese of Rome, in the tradition of the Catholic Church, it has claims as the Mother Church of the world. For this reason, St. John Lateran is the only church that is also known as an archbasilica.
- St. Peter's Basilica, also called the Vatican Basilica, is a major pilgrimage site, built over the burial place of Peter the Apostle.
- St. Paul Outside the Walls, also known as the Ostian Basilica because it is situated on the road that led to Ostia, is believed to be built over the burial place of Paul the Apostle.
- St. Mary Major, also called the Liberian Basilica because the original building was attributed to Pope Liberius, is the largest church in Rome dedicated to Mary, the mother of Jesus.

=== Papal basilicas ===
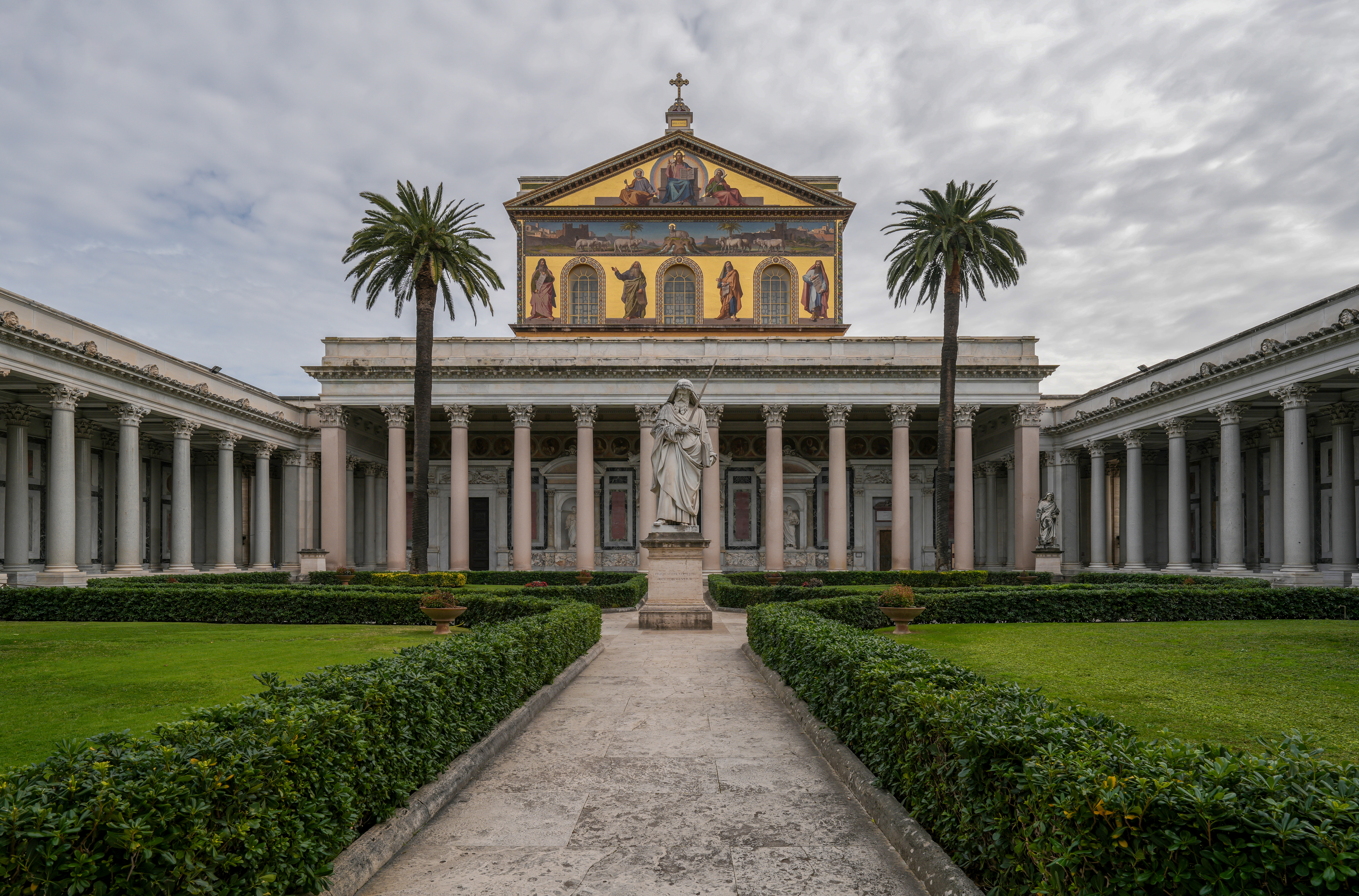
Basilica of St. Paul Outside-the-Walls 41°51′31″N 12°28′38″E

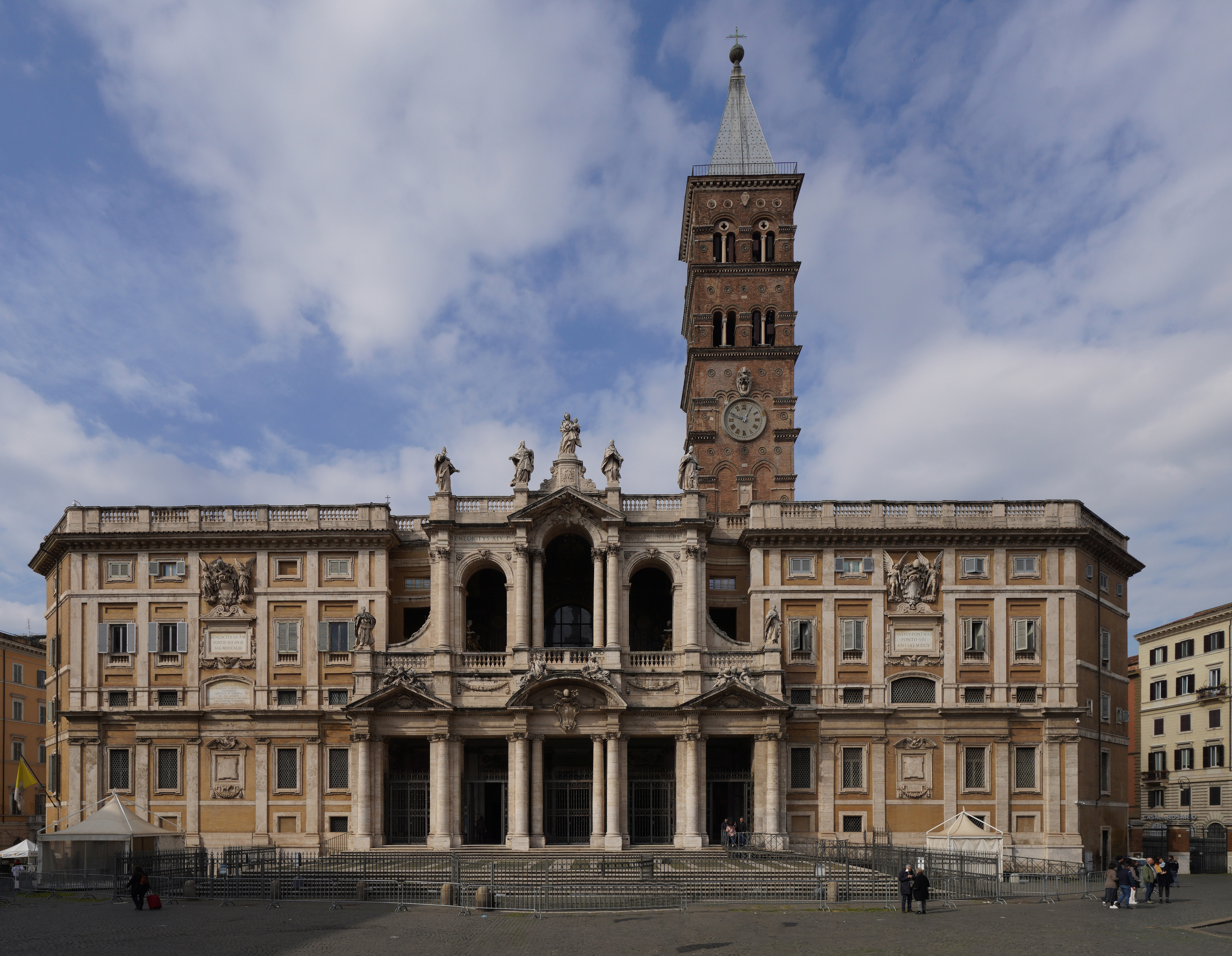
Basilica of St. Mary Major 41°53′51″N 12°29′55″E

The four major basilicas, along with the minor basilica of St. Lawrence Outside-the-Walls, were formerly known as patriarchal basilicas as they were associated with the five ancient patriarchal sees of Christendom. Upon relinquishing the title of Patriarch of the West in 2006, Pope Benedict XVI renamed these basilicas from patriarchal basilicas to papal basilicas.

- Archbasilica of Saint John Lateran was associated with the Pope, the Bishop of Rome and the Patriarch of the West.
- Basilica of Saint Peter was associated with the Patriarch of Constantinople.
- Basilica of Saint Paul Outside the Walls was associated with the Patriarch of Alexandria.
- Basilica of Saint Mary Major was associated with the Patriarch of Antioch.
- Basilica of Saint Lawrence Outside the Walls was associated with the Patriarch of Jerusalem.

Nominally, the respective patriarchs could avail of accommodation attached to the basilicas should they have business in Rome. These assignments, however, are now purely historical. In some cases, more than one patriarch holds the title for the same patriarchate. For example, each of the patriarchs of the Melkite Catholic, Maronite Catholic, and Syriac Catholic Churches holds the title of "Patriarch of Antioch".

Each of the five papal basilicas is also one of the Seven Pilgrim Churches of Rome.

== Minor basilicas ==
The regulations governing minor basilicas were determined by the Sacred Congregation of Rites in the decree Domus Dei of 6 June 1968. Pope John Paul II revised and refined these regulations in the light of experience and new liturgical requirements, approved and published by the Congregation of the Divine Cult and Discipline of the Sacraments in the decree Domus ecclesiae of 9 November 1989. The petition of the bishop of the diocese is now required, as well as the nihil obstat (Ecclesiastical Latin for 'nothing stands in the way') of the diocese's National Conference of Bishops. A statement of the origin and history of the church in question, and its current religious status, is required, along with photographs of the edifice. A detailed questionnaire must be completed and submitted.

The privileges attached to the status of minor basilica, which is conferred by papal brief, include a certain precedence before other churches, the right of the conopaeum (a baldachin resembling an umbrella; also called umbraculum, ombrellino, papilio or a sinicchio) and the bell (tintinnabulum), which are carried side by side in procession at the head of the clergy on state occasions, and the cappa magna which is worn by the canons or secular members of the collegiate chapter when assisting at the Divine Office. In the case of major basilicas these umbraculae are made of cloth of gold and red velvet, while those of minor basilicas are made of yellow and red silk – the colors traditionally associated with both the Papal See and the city of Rome.

Regarding minor basilicas the terms "papal minor basilica", "pontifical minor basilica" and "patriarchal minor basilica" are also in use.

=== Papal minor basilicas ===
There are three papal minor basilicas, one in Rome, the Basilica of St Lawrence Outside-the-Walls, and two in Assisi associated with Francis of Assisi situated in or near his home town. (Note: The title of minor basilicas was first attributed to the church of San Nicola di Tolentino in 1783. Older minor basilicas are referred to as "immemorial basilicas".) Architecturally, the Papal Basilica of St Francis of Assisi is an aisleless nave with lateral chapels.

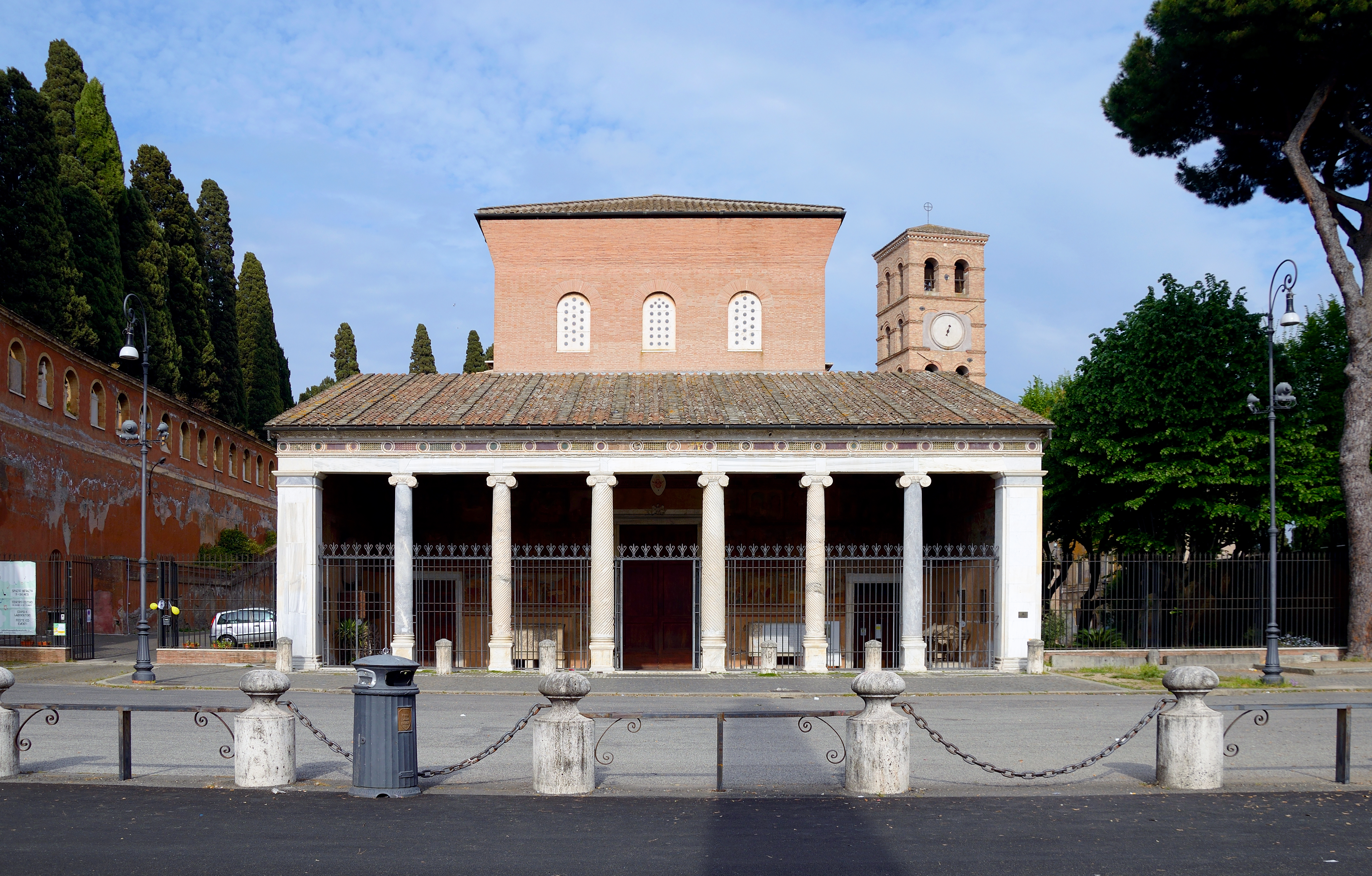
Basilica of St Lawrence Outside-the-Walls, Rome

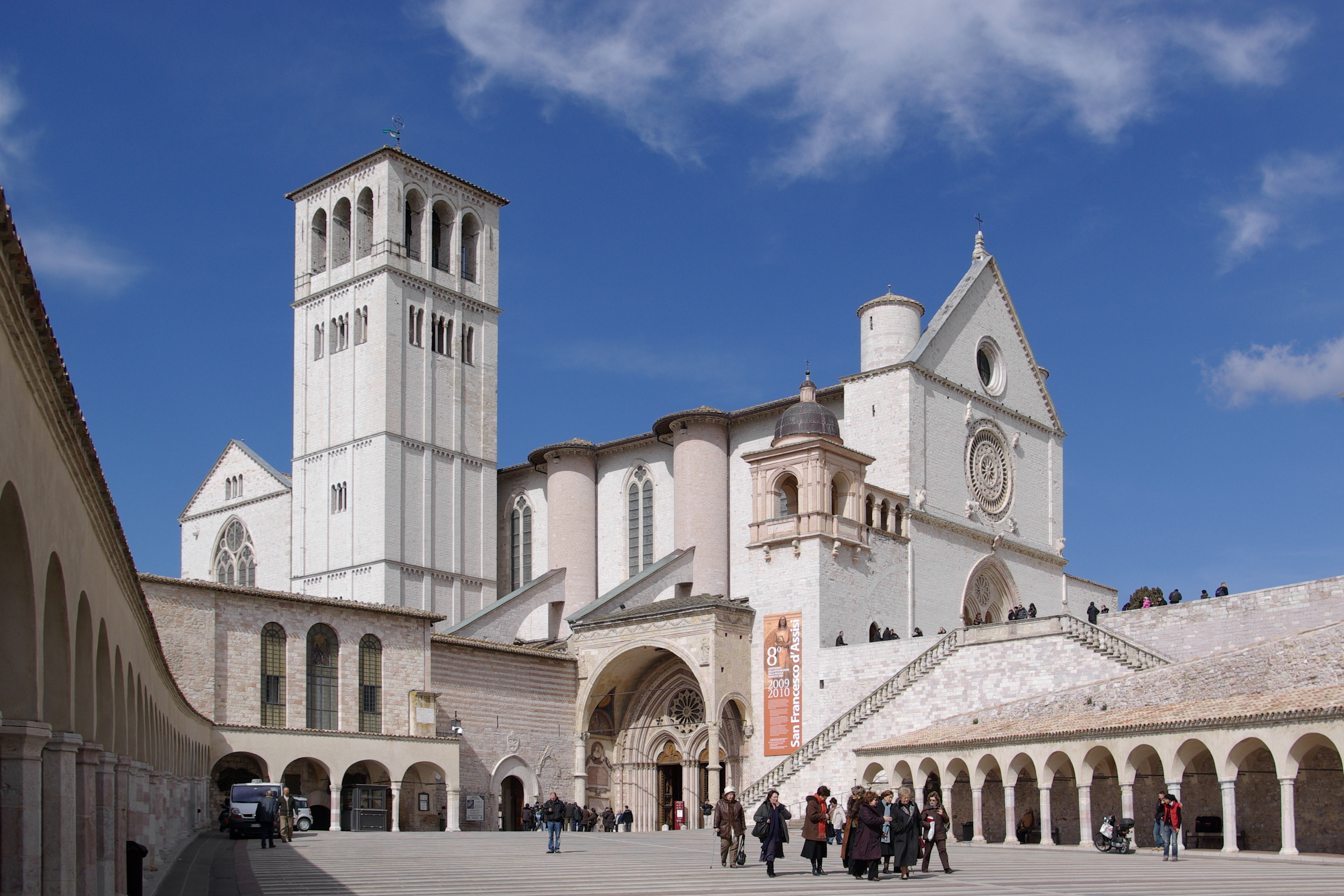
Basilica of St Francis of Assisi, Assisi

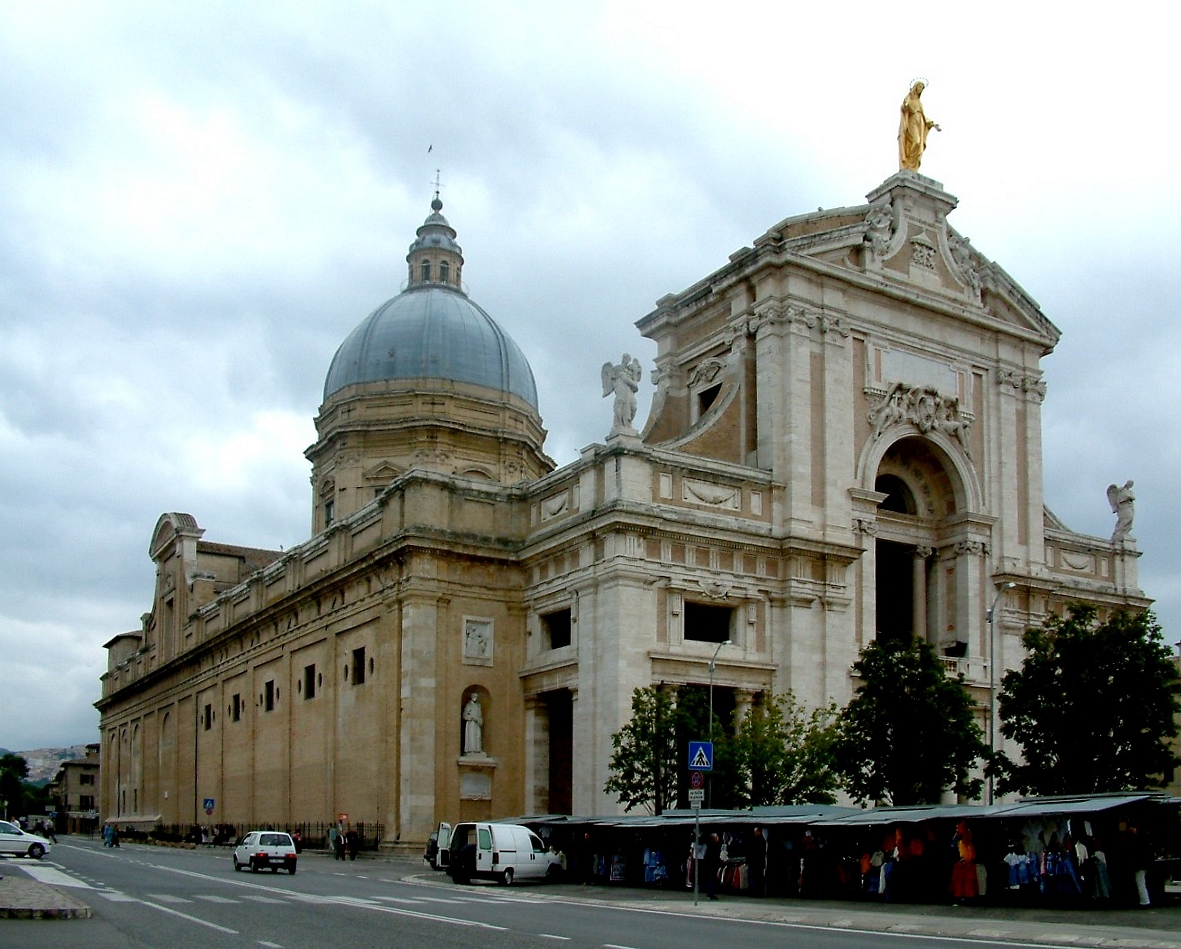
St Mary of the Angels, Assisi

=== Pontifical minor basilicas ===
There are six pontifical minor basilicas in the world (the word "pontifical" referring to the title "pontiff" of a bishop, and more particularly of the Bishop of Rome):

- Pontifical Basilica of Our Lady of the Rosary, Pompei
- Pontifical Basilica of St. Nicholas, Bari
- Pontifical Basilica of St. Anthony, Padua
- Pontifical Basilica of the Holy House, Loreto
- Pontifical Basilica of St. Michael, Madrid
- Basilica of Our Lady of Aparecida, Aparecida
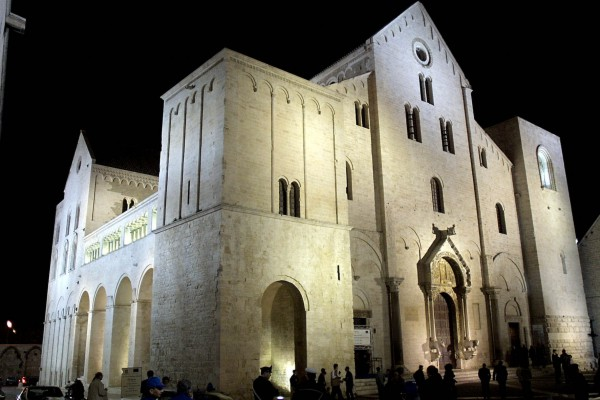
Pontifical Basilica of St. Nicholas
Bari

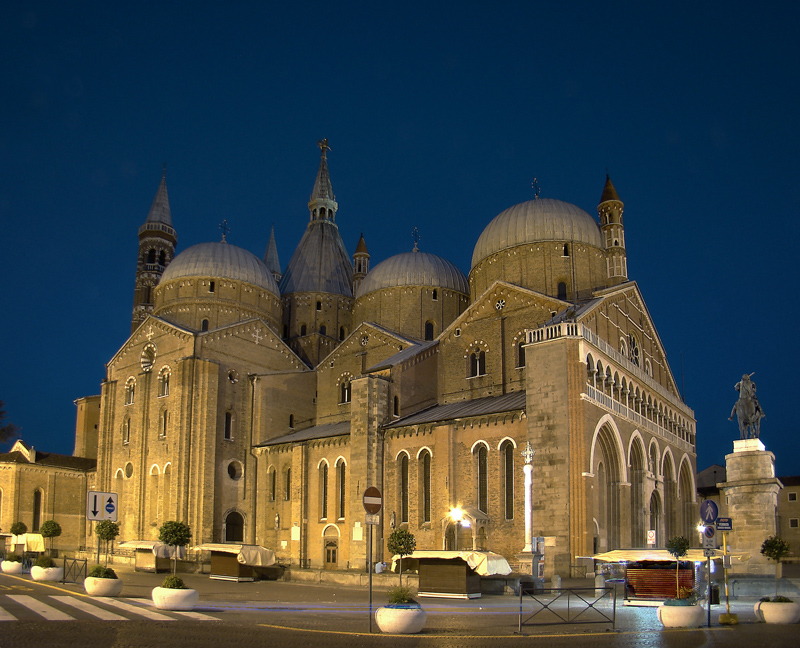
Pontifical Basilica of St. Anthony
Padua

=== Patriarchal minor basilicas ===
There are two patriarchal minor basilicas associated with archbishops who have the title of patriarch – the Patriarchal Cathedral Basilica of St Mark in Venice and the Patriarchal Basilica of Aquileia.

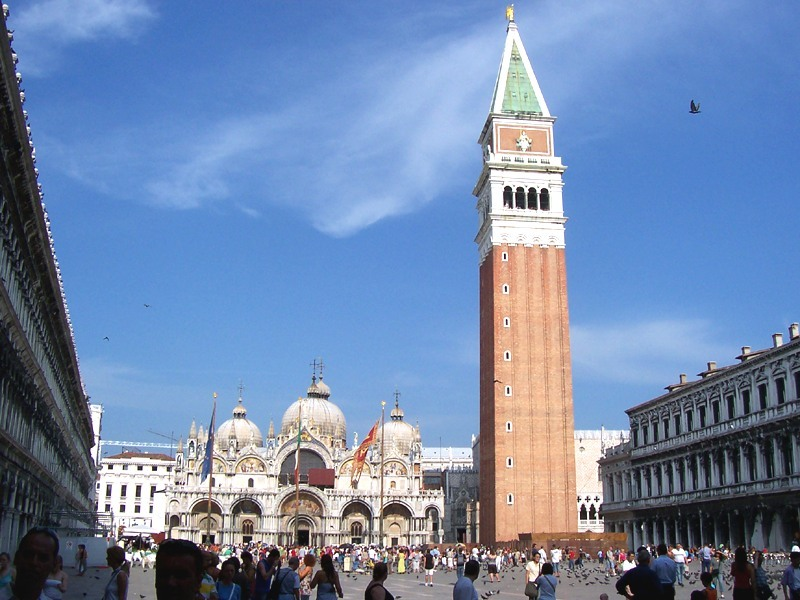
Patriarchal Cathedral Basilica of St. Mark Venice

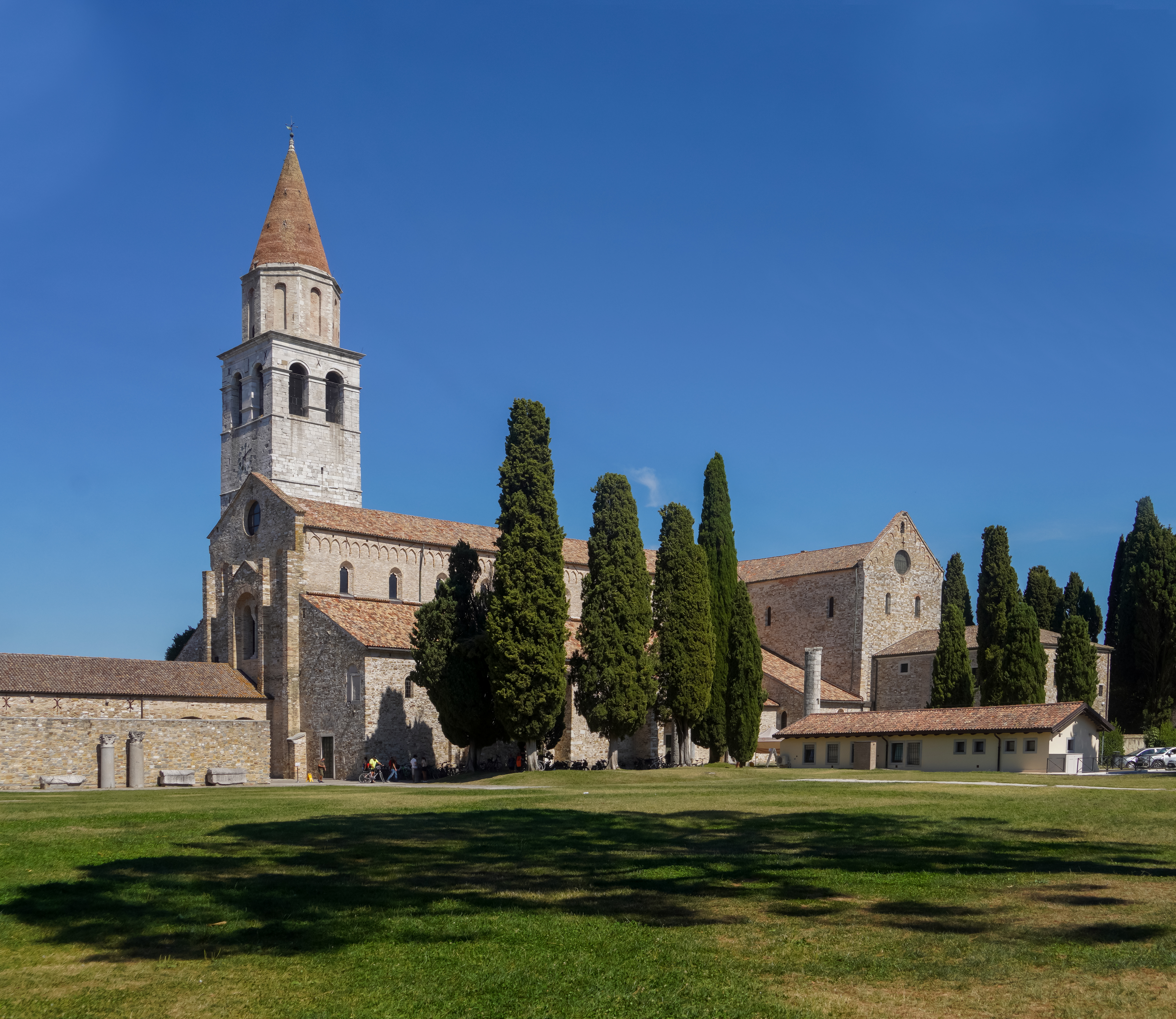
Patriarchal Basilica of Aquileia

Not all patriarchal cathedrals are minor basilicas. The Patriarchal Cathedral of St. Mary Major (in Lisbon, Portugal) and the Patriarchal Cathedral of Santa Catarina (in Old Goa, India) are not.

=== Other basilicas and pilgrimages ===
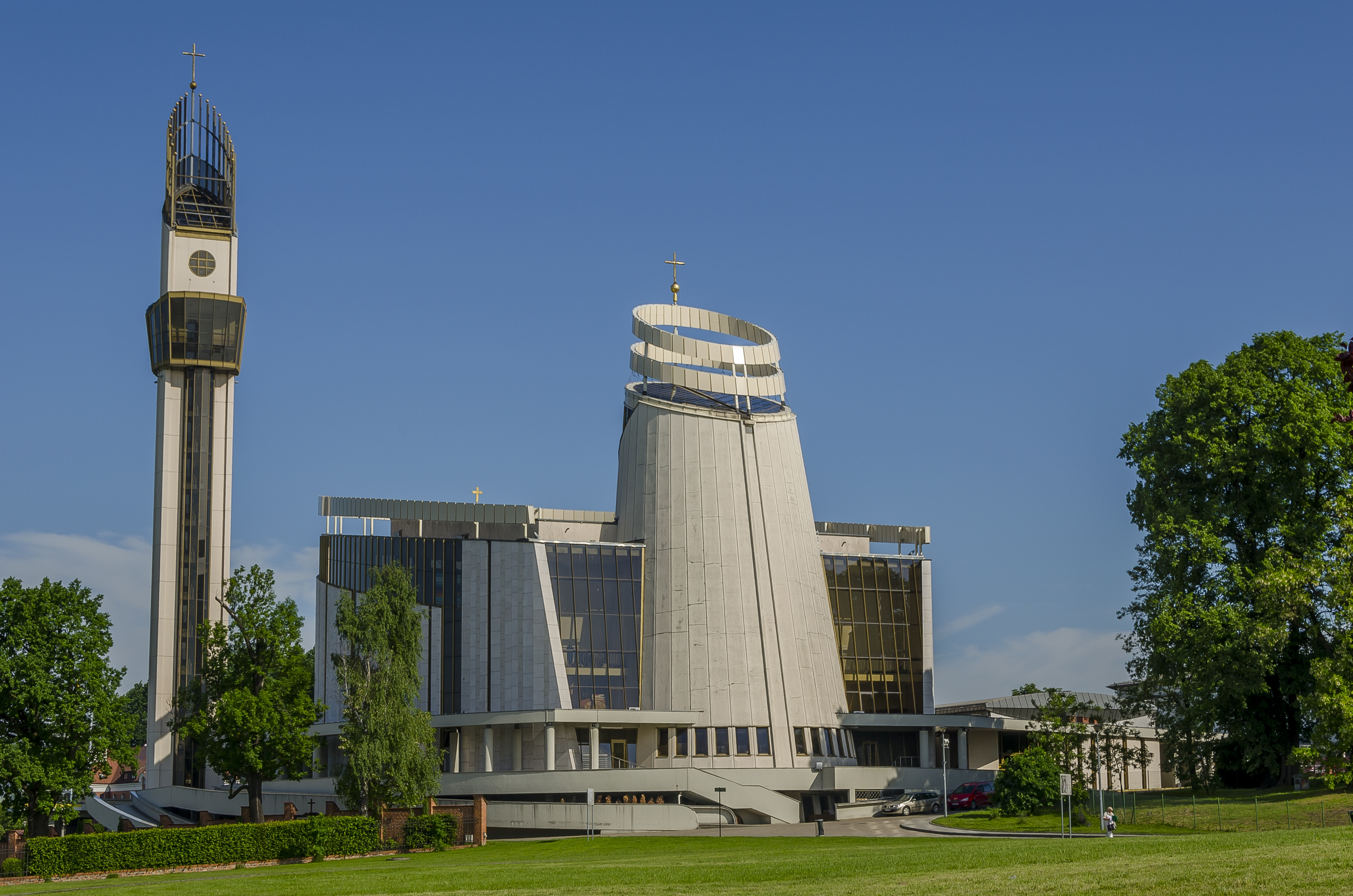
The Basilica of Divine Mercy, constructed in 2002 in Kraków, Poland, received two million pilgrims in 2011.

In recent times, the title of minor basilica has been attributed to important pilgrimage churches and national centers of the faith. In 1999 Bishop Francesco Giogia stated that the Basilica of Our Lady of Guadalupe in Mexico City (constructed in the twentieth century) was the most visited Catholic shrine in the world, followed by San Giovanni Rotondo and Basilica of the National Shrine of Our Lady Aparecida in Brazil. Millions of pilgrims visit the shrines of Our Lady of Lourdes and Our Lady of Fatima. Pilgrimage basilicas continue to attract well over 30 million pilgrims per year. Ireland contains two pilgrimage basilicas: Knock Shrine and St Patrick's Purgatory (Lough Derg).

Every year, on 13 May and 13 October, the significant dates of the Fatima apparitions, pilgrims fill the country road that leads to the Sanctuary of Our Lady of Fátima with crowds that approach one million on each day. In December 2009 the Basilica of Our Lady of Guadalupe set a new record with 6.1 million pilgrims during Friday and Saturday for the anniversary of Our Lady of Guadalupe.

=== Ecclesiastical basilicas by region ===
As of 31 December 2020, there are 1,881 Catholic churches that bear the title of basilica.

Region	Basilicas
West Europe	1,116
East Europe	244
North America	152
Central America	26
South America	240
South and East Asia	59
Central and Southwest Asia	12
Oceania	8
Western and Northern Africa	14
Eastern and Central Africa	9
Southern Africa	1
Total	1,881

St. Mary's Cathedral in Ernakulam, India is the Episcopal See of the Syro-Malabar Catholic Church. The cathedral was elevated to the status of basilica by Pope Paul VI on 20 March 1974. St. George Forane Church in Angamaly, also of the Syro-Malabar rite, was raised to the status of basilica on 24 June 2009 by Pope Benedict XVI.

On 10 May 1997 Pope John Paul II visited the Basilica of Our Lady of Lebanon in Harissa, Lebanon. The basilica is under the Maronite Catholic Patriarchate. The Basilica and National Shrine of Our Lady of Lebanon in North Jackson, Ohio, is under the jurisdiction of the Eparchy of Our Lady of Lebanon. The shrine was elevated to the status of a minor basilica by Pope Francis on 8 July 2014.

On July 11th, 2015, Pope Francis visited the Cathedral of Our Lady of Miracles in Caacupé, Paraguay. During his visit to the country, Pope Francis elevated the Cathedral to the status of Minor Basilica.

=== Gallery of minor basilicas around the world ===
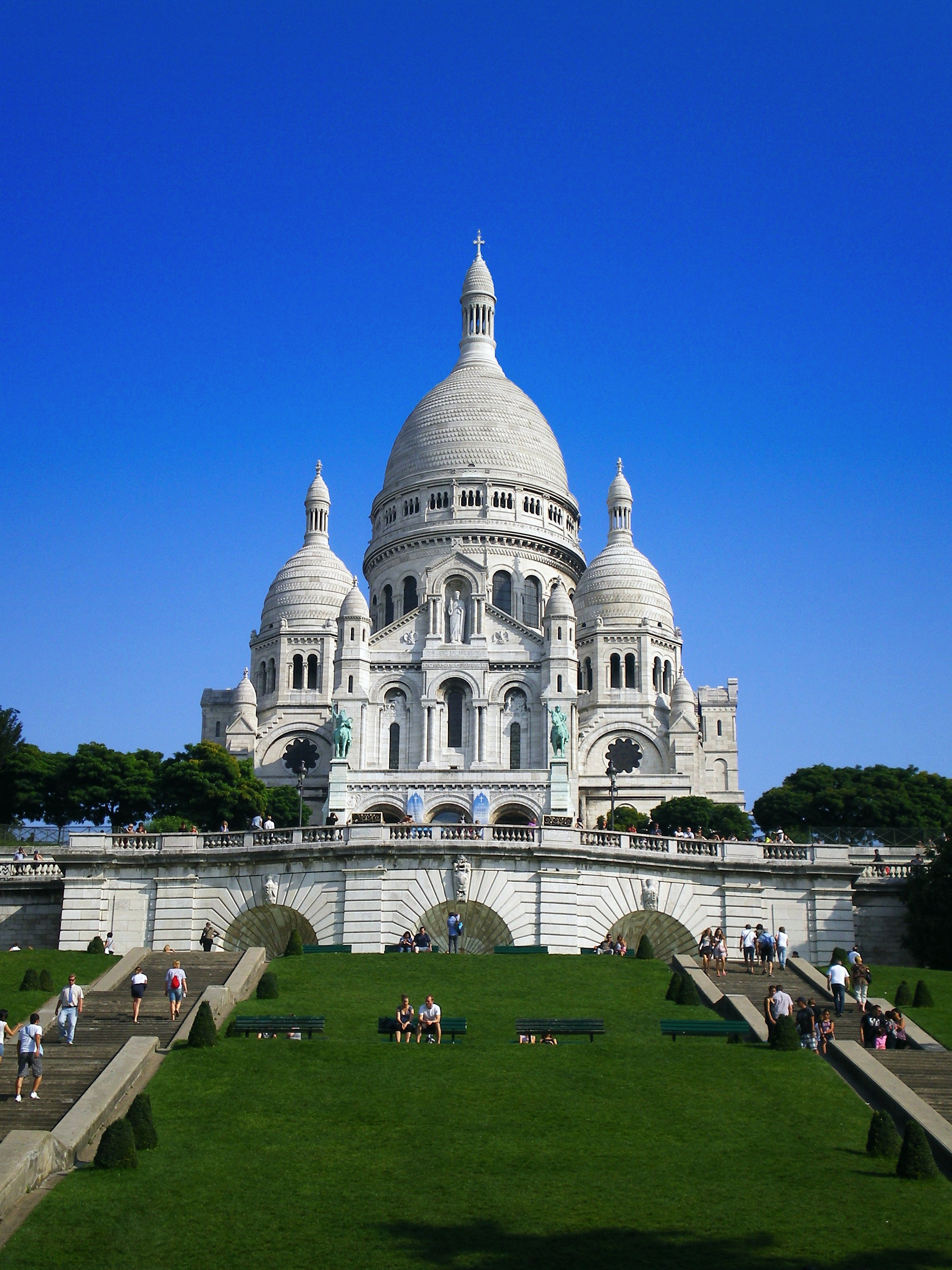
Basilica of the Sacred Heart, Montmartre, Paris.

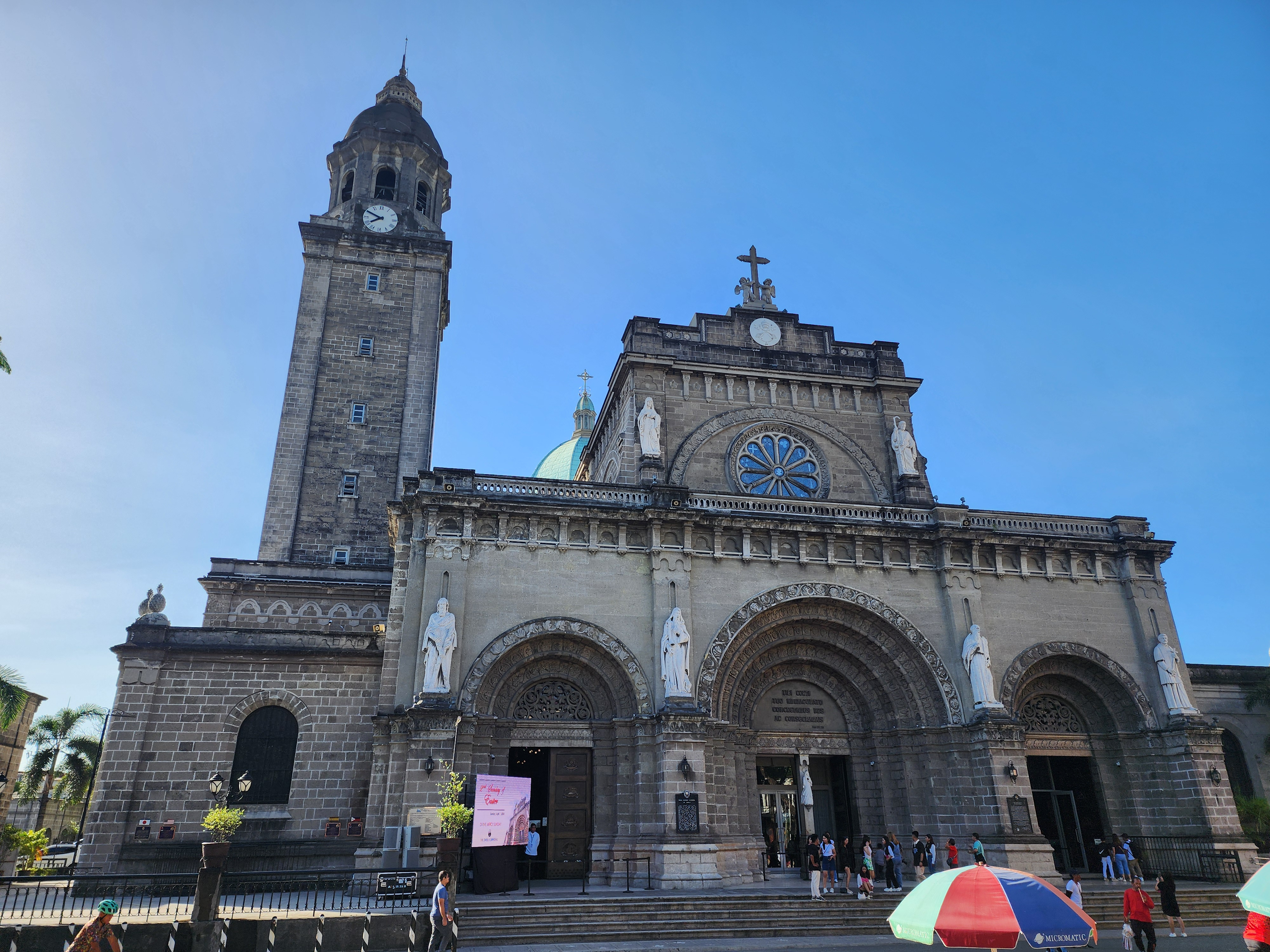
Cathedral-Basilica of the Immaculate Conception in Manila, Philippines.

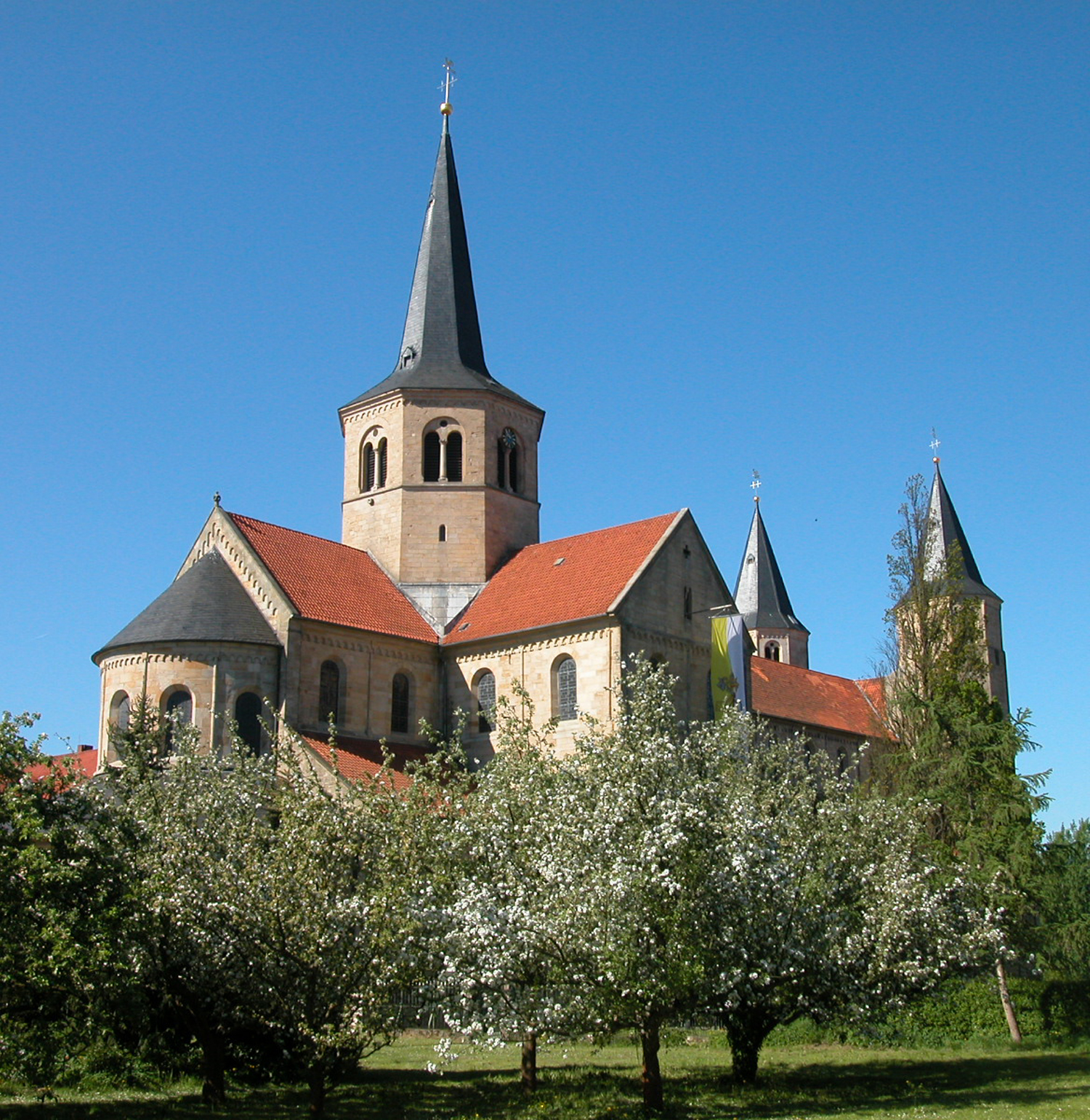
Basilica of Saint Gotthard in Hildesheim, Germany.

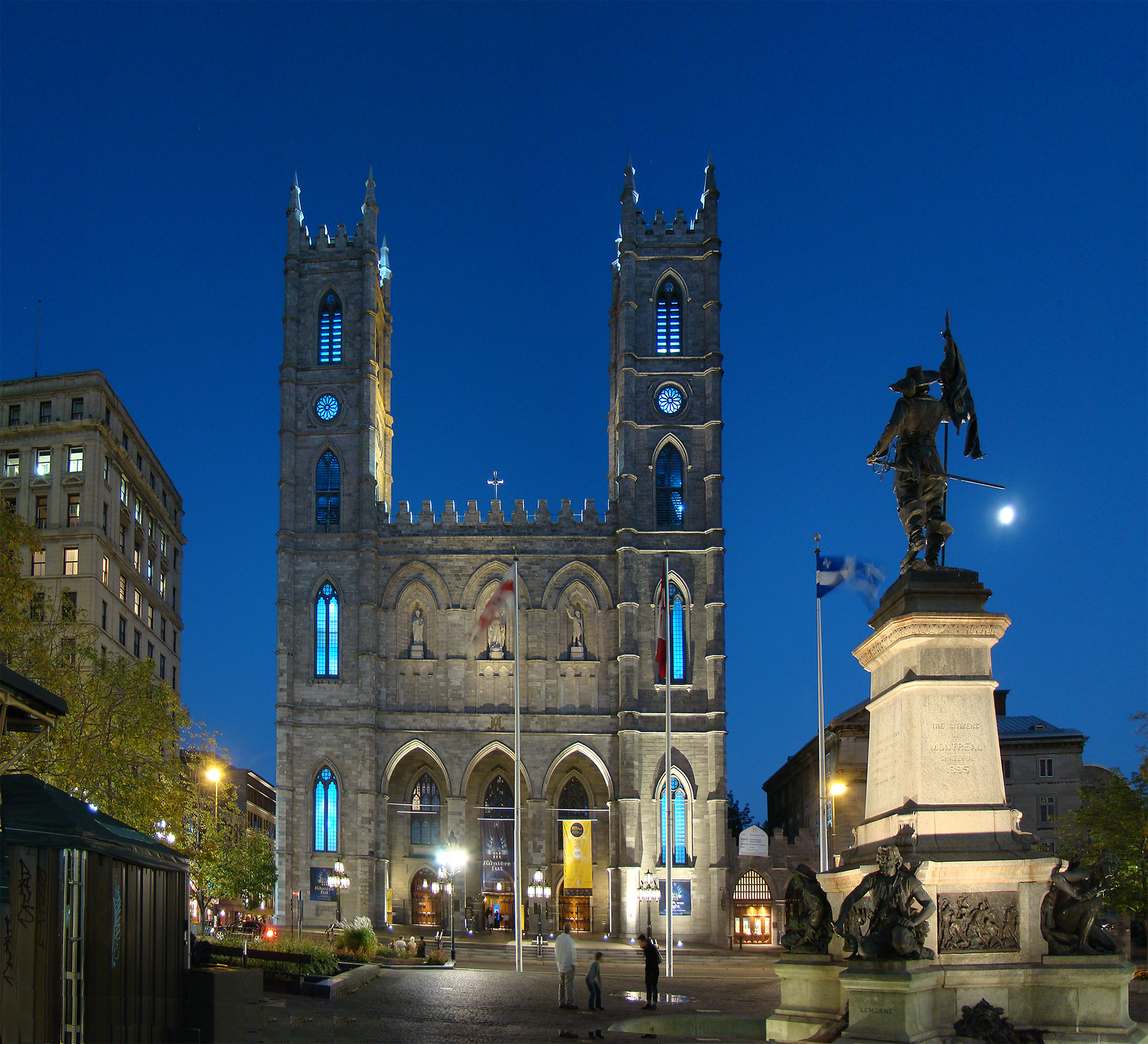
Notre-Dame Basilica in Montreal, Canada.

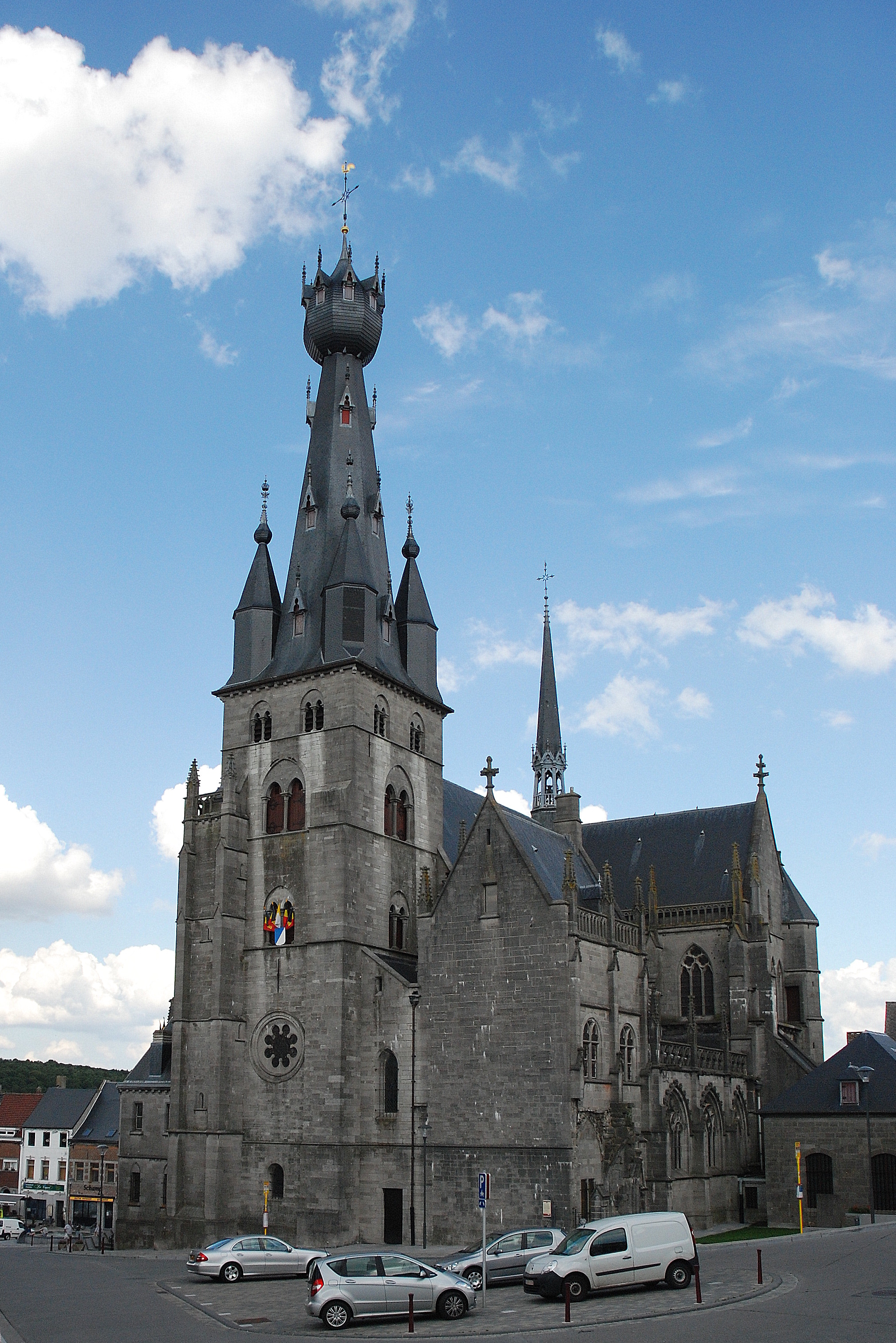
Basilica of Saint Maternus, Walcourt is a Gothic basilica and medieval pilgrimage site.

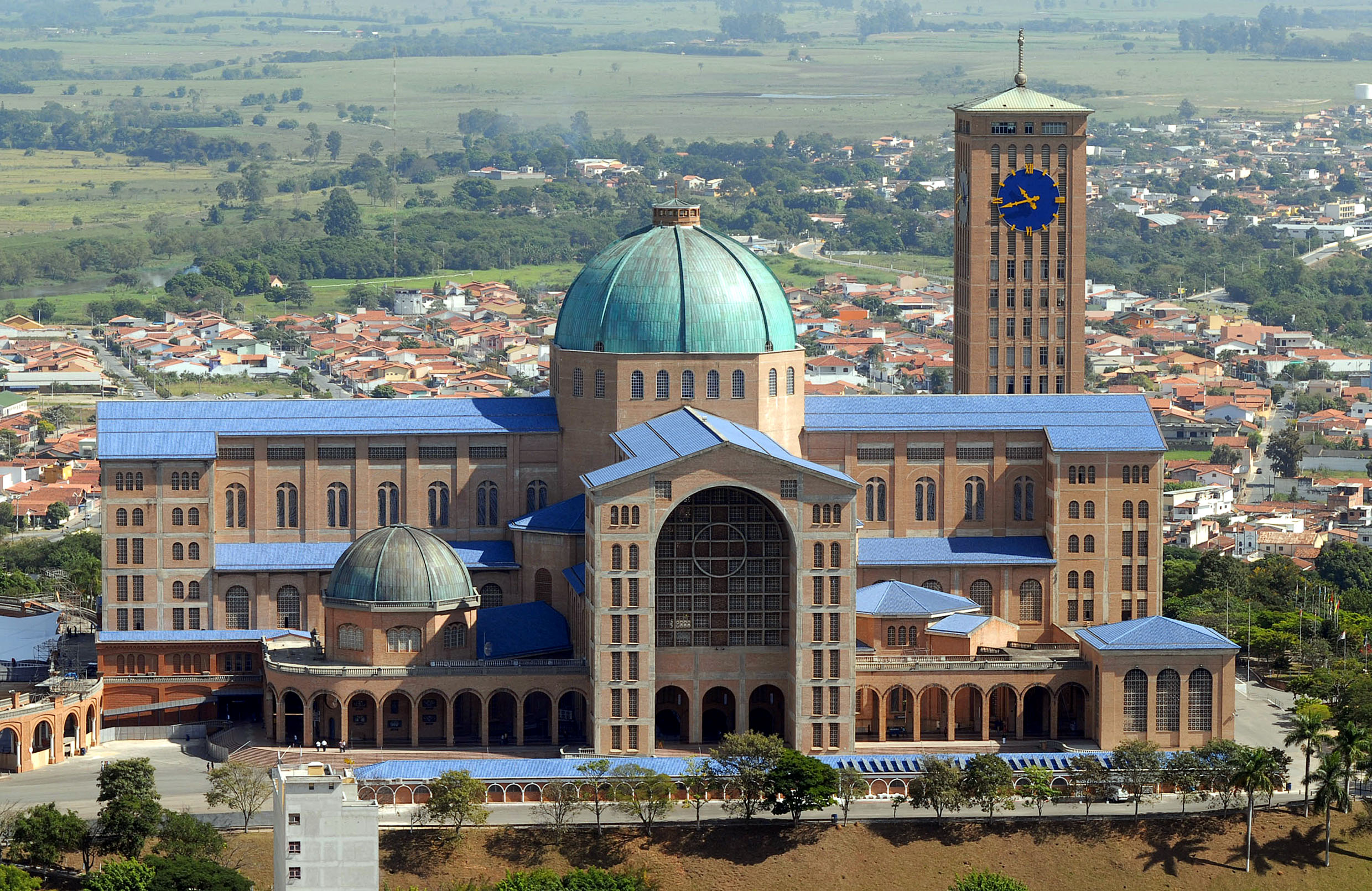
Basilica of the National Shrine of Our Lady Aparecida in Aparecida, Brazil.

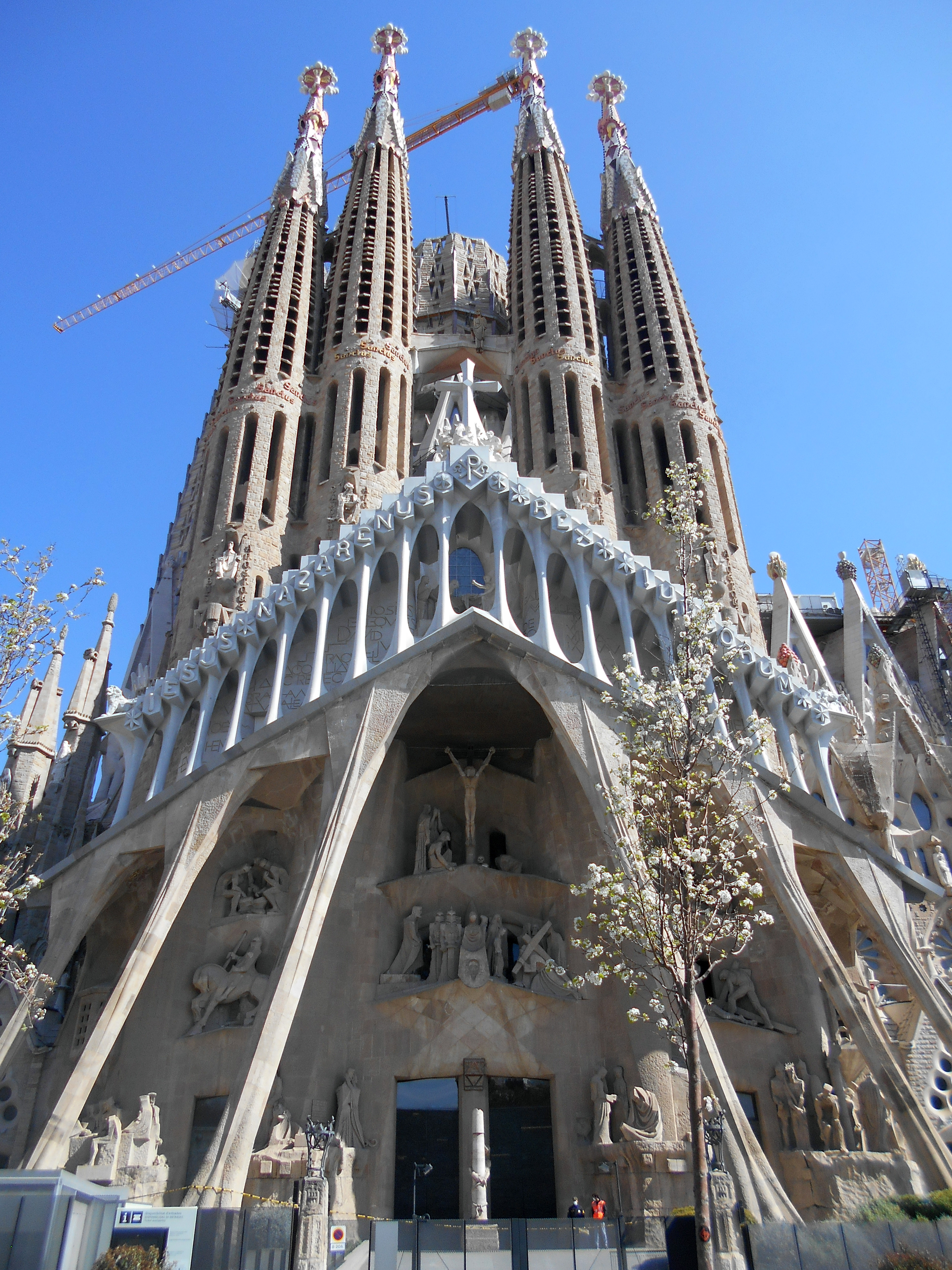
Basilica of the Sagrada Família, Eixample, Barcelona.

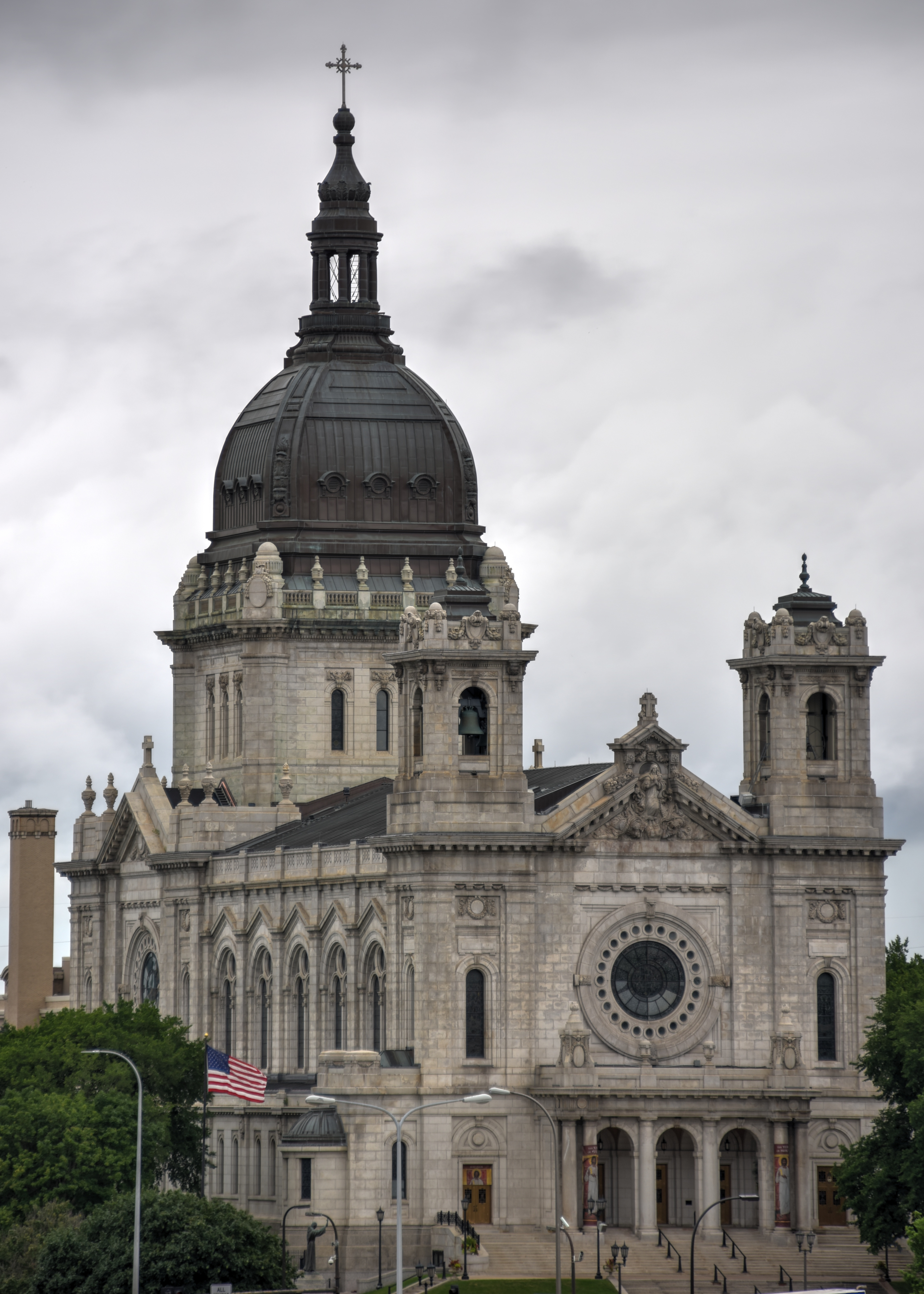
Basilica of Saint Mary in Minneapolis, MN. The first basilica established in the United States.

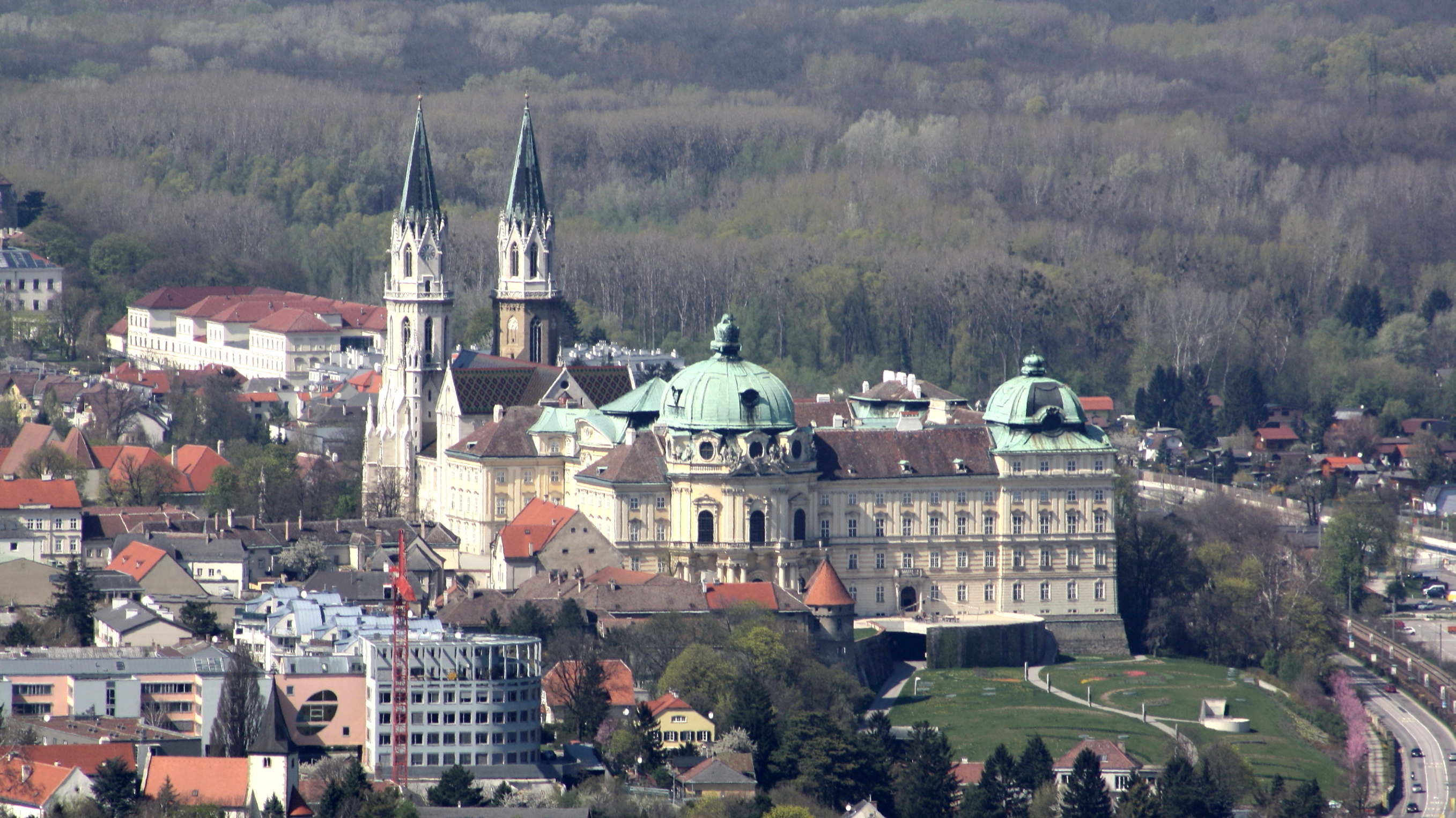
Basilica of Our Lady in Klosterneuburg, Austria.

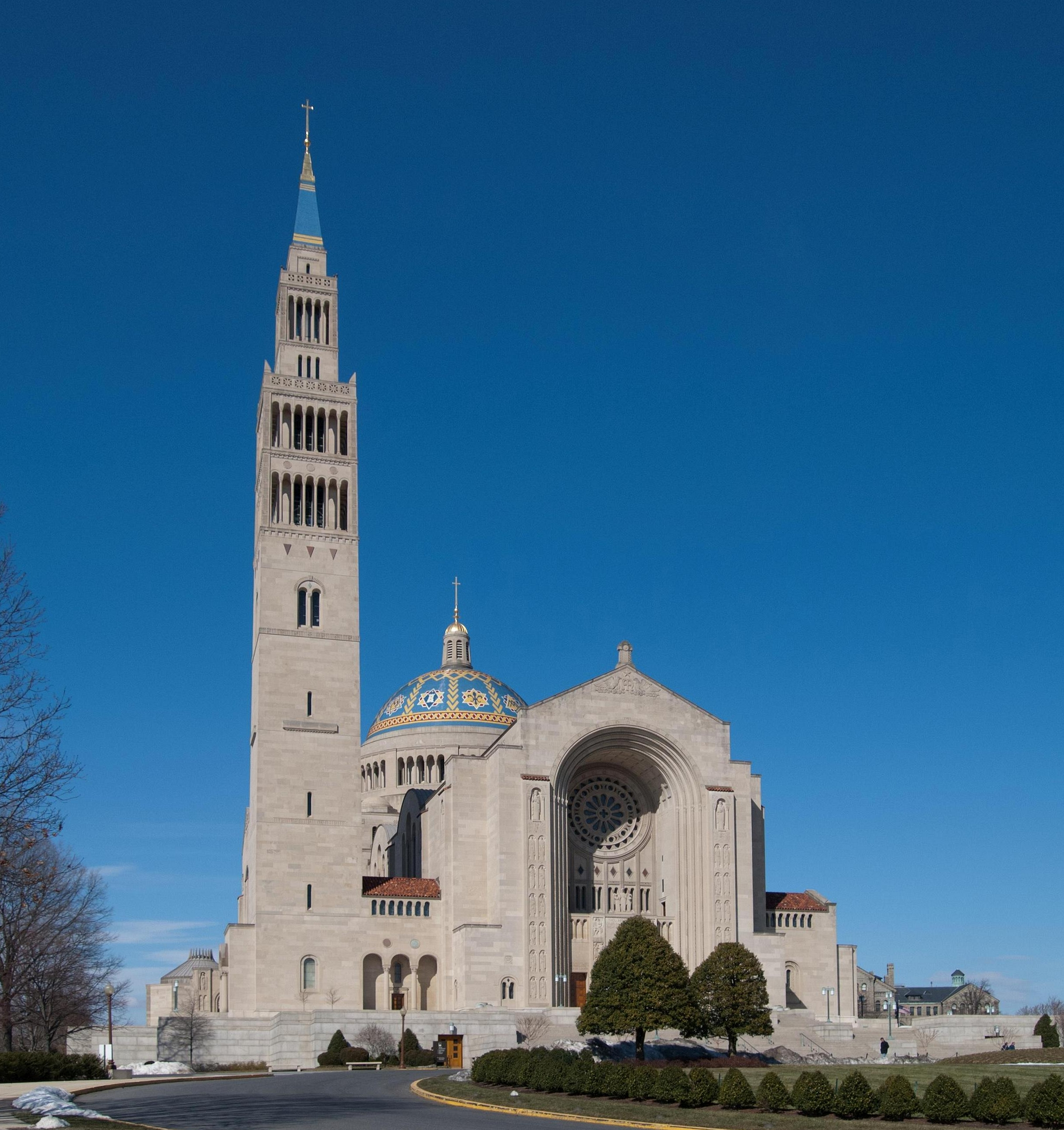
Basilica of the National Shrine of the Immaculate Conception in Washington, D.C. National and Patronal Church of Catholicism in the United States.

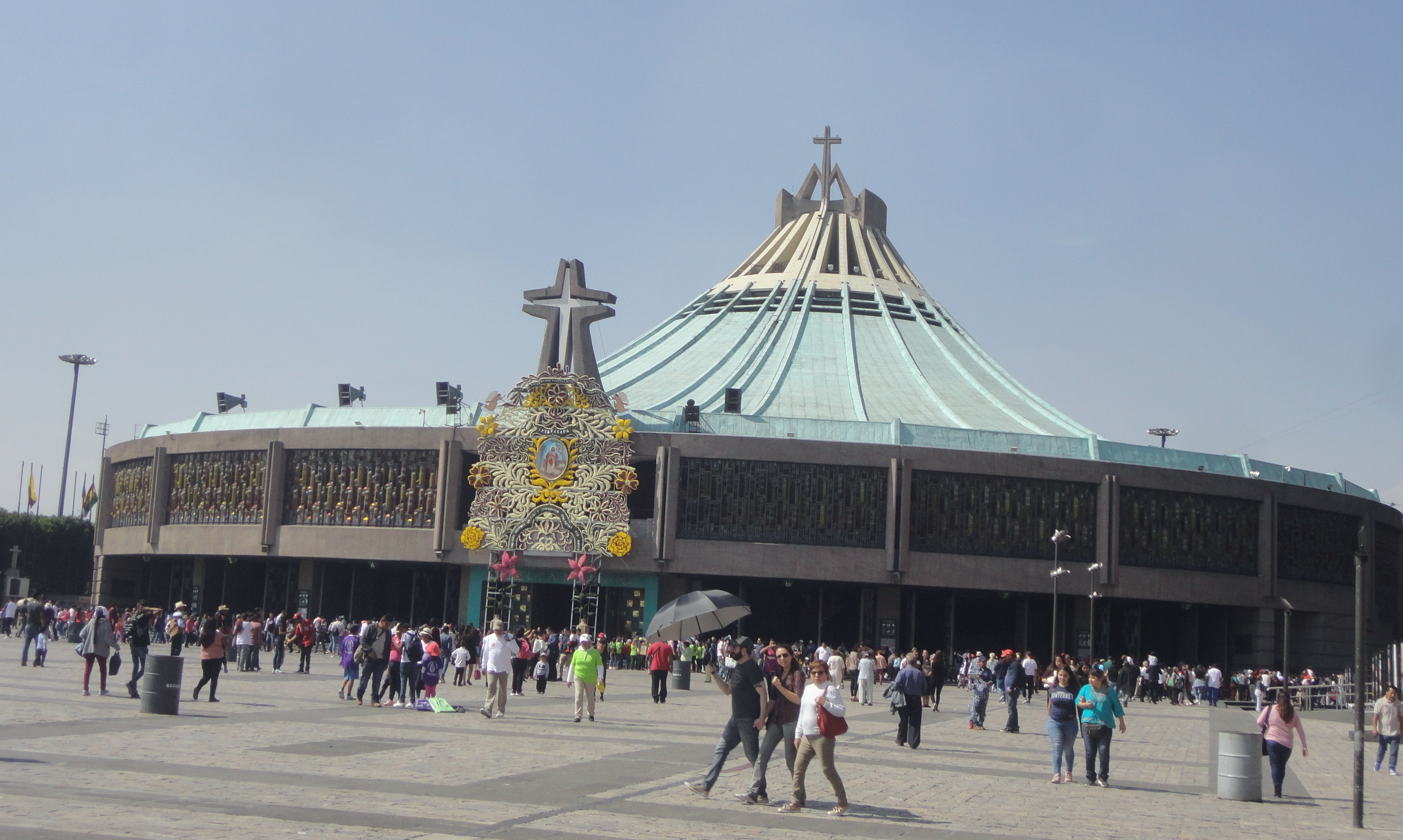
Basilica of Our Lady of Guadalupe in Mexico City, Mexico.

Basilica of Our Lady of Peace of Yamoussoukro in Yamoussoukro, Côte d'Ivoire.

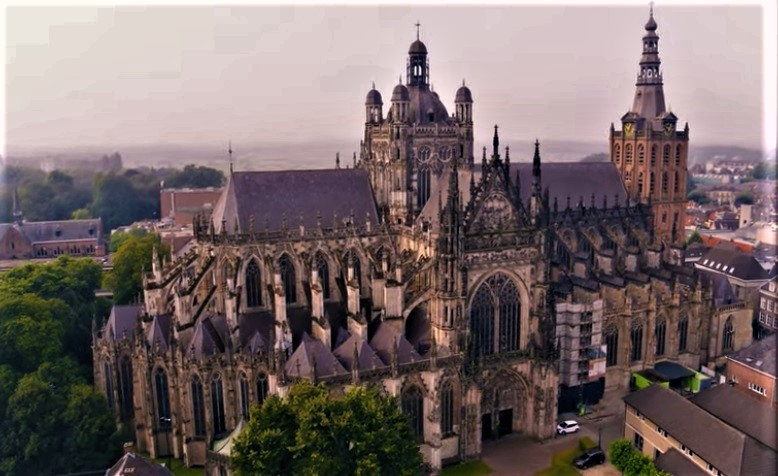
St. John's Cathedral in 's-Hertogenbosch, Netherlands.

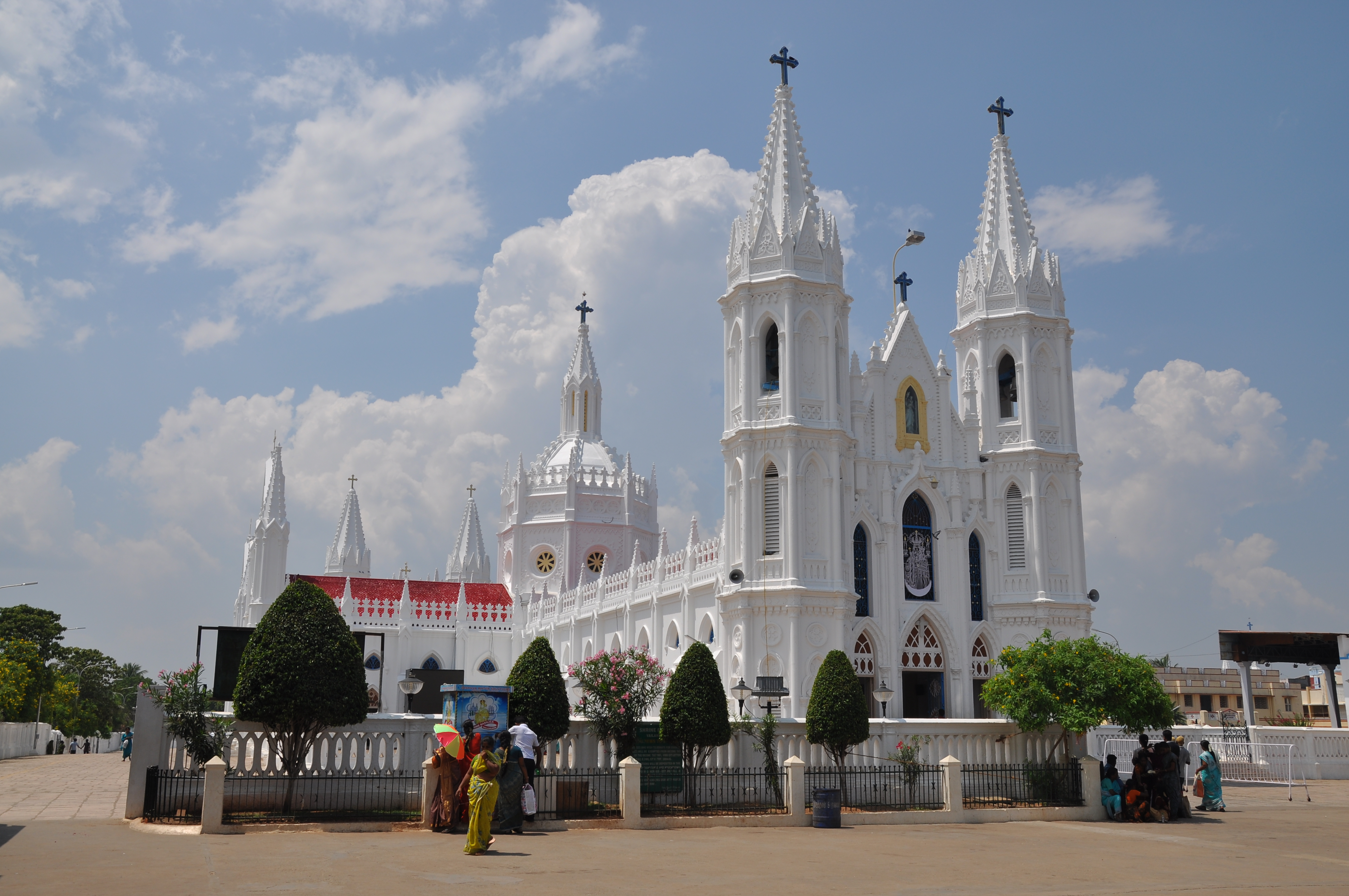
Basilica of Our Lady of Good Health, Velankanni, India.

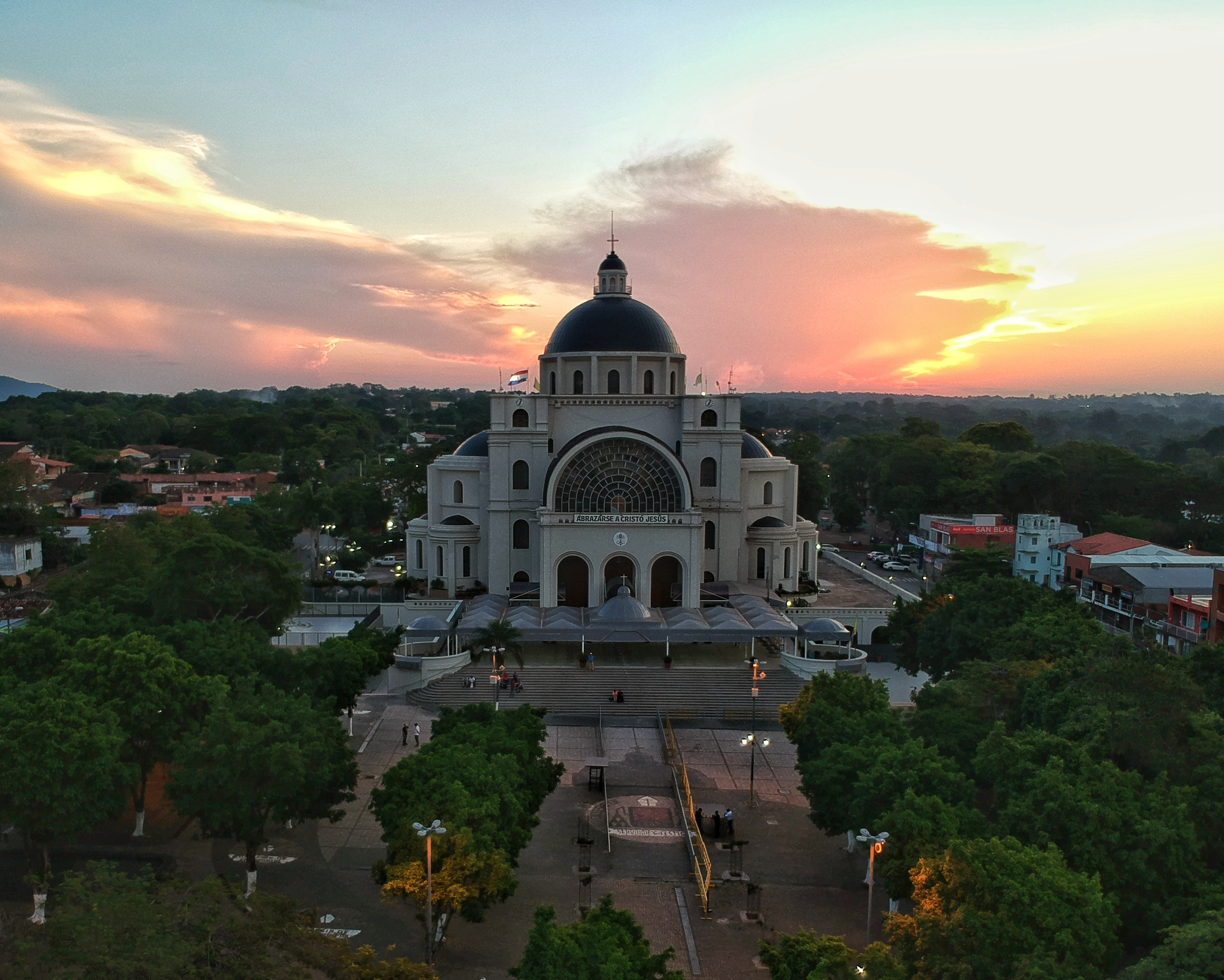
Catedral de Nuestra Señora de los Milagros (Caacupé)

== See also ==
- Architecture of cathedrals and great churches
- Catholic Marian church buildings
- Duomo
- List of Catholic basilicas
