= Jackson-Milton Local School District =

School district in Ohio, United States

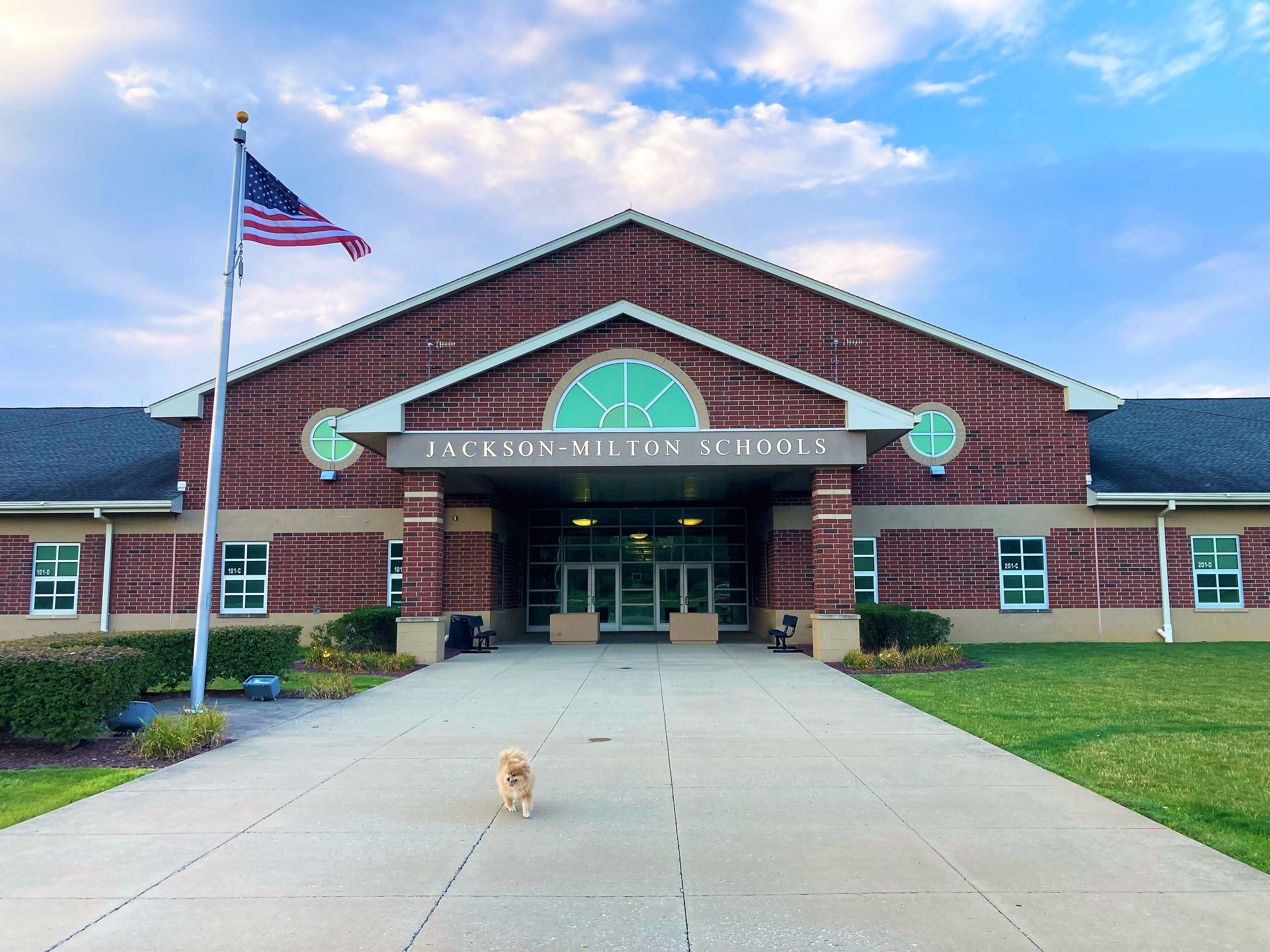
- Jackson-Milton K-12 building entrance

Address
- 13910 Mahoning Ave North Jackson, Ohio, 44451; United States

District information
- Type: Public
- Grades: K–12
- Superintendent: Kirk Baker
- Accreditation: Ohio Department of Education
- NCES District ID: 3904832

Students and staff
- Enrollment: 771 (2024–25)
- Staff: 49.89 (FTE)
- Student–teacher ratio: 15.45
- District mascot: Blue Jays
- Colors: Royal Blue & White

Other information
- Website: https://www.jacksonmilton.k12.oh.us/

The Jackson-Milton Local School District is a school district located in northern Mahoning County, Ohio. It serves students in grades K-12 living in Jackson and Milton and North Jackson townships. The district consists of one high school, one middle school and one elementary school. All buildings and offices are all located in North Jackson.

== History ==
The Jackson-Milton Local School District was formed in the early 1900s with the consolidation of Jackson and Milton township schools.

From 1998 until 2001, Jackson-Milton Local Schools were placed under fiscal emergency by the State of Ohio, meaning the district required state oversight to stabilize its finances. Through levy approvals and budget restructuring, the district eventually exited fiscal emergency and returned to local financial control.

In 2009, Jackson-Milton relocated its high/middle school campus to its current location on Mahoning Ave, with its old building, which was built in 1913 later being demolished

== Schools ==
Schools within the district consist of:

=== High school ===
- Jackson-Milton High School

=== Middle school ===
- Jackson-Milton Middle School

=== Elementary school ===
- Jackson-Milton Elementary School

=== Former schools ===
- Jackson Township School
- Milton Township School
