= South Canal =

South Canal may refer to several places:

== France ==
- Canal du Midi, literally Canal of the South, a canal in France

== United States ==
- Folsom South Canal, an aqueduct in California
- South Canal, Ohio, an unincorporated community in Trumbull County
- South Hadley Canal, a former canal in Massachusetts

== See also ==
- South Channel
