= Jackson-Milton High School =

Public high school located in Jackson Township, Ohio, United States

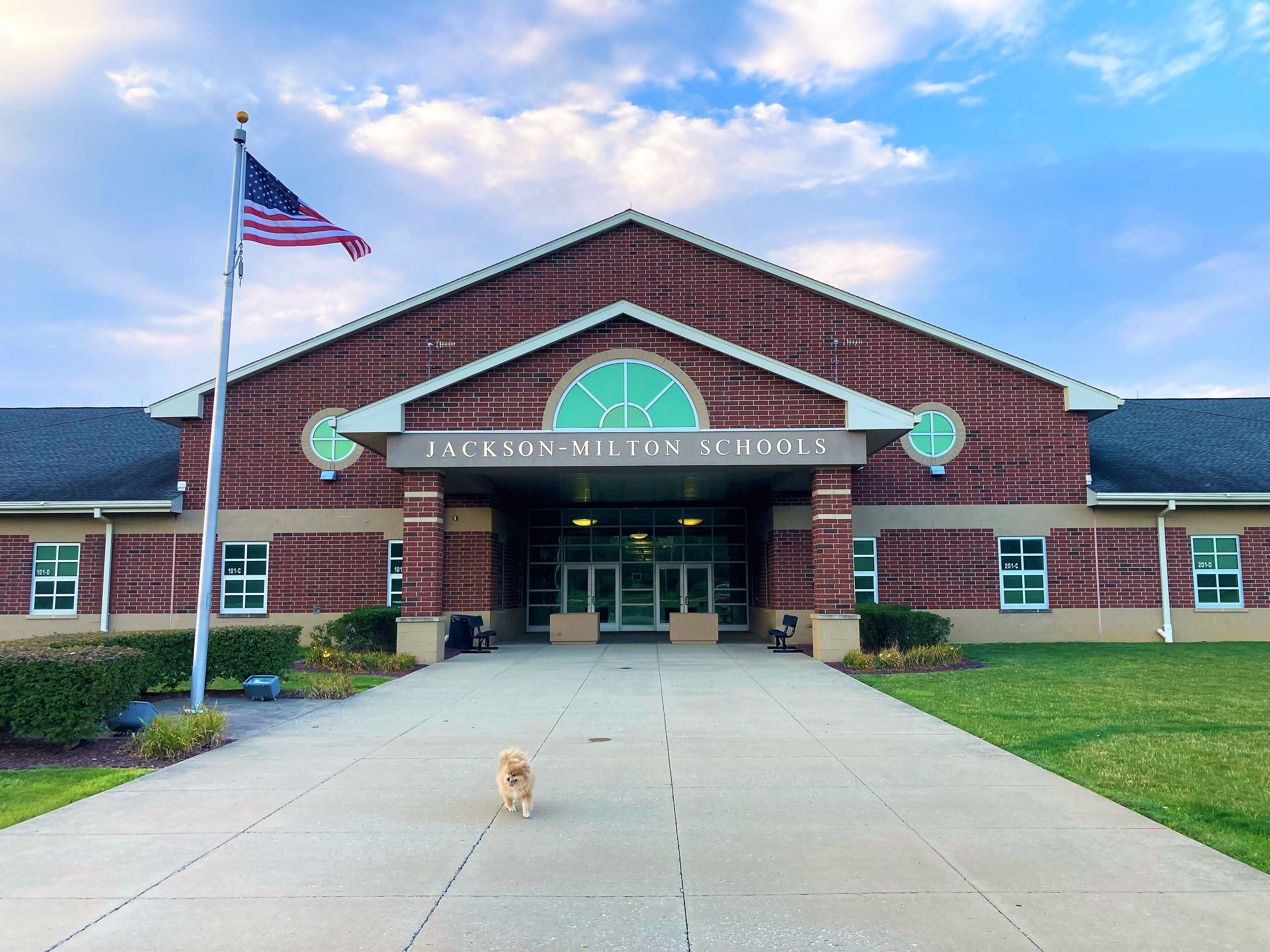
- Jackson Milton high school

Location
- 13910 Mahoning Avenue; North Jackson, Ohio 44451; United States
- 41°06′00″N 80°54′54″W

Information
- Type: Public, Coeducational high school
- School district: Jackson-Milton Local School District
- NCES School ID: 390483203208
- Principal: David Vega
- Teaching staff: 13.55 (on an FTE basis)
- Grades: 7–12
- Enrollment: 170 (2024–2025)
- Student to teacher ratio: 12.55
- Colors: Blue & white
- Athletics conference: Mahoning Valley Athletic Conference
- Nickname: Blue Jays
- Website: jmhs.jacksonmilton.k12.oh.us

Jackson-Milton High School is a public junior-senior high school located in Jackson Township, Ohio. The high school serves Jackson Township, Milton Township, North Jackson and Craig Beach. It is the only high school in the Jackson-Milton Local School District. Athletic teams are known as the Blue Jays, and they compete in the Ohio High School Athletic Association as a member of the Mahoning Valley Athletic Conference.

== History ==
Jackson-Milton High School in the early to mid-20th century, after the consolidation of Jackson and Milton township schools. The consolidated high school occupied the former Jackson Township high school building that was built in 1913. Later additions to the high school included a west wing, added in 1922 and an east wing in 1936. The high school was demolished in 2010.

Construction on the current campus began in Spring 2008, costing $14.5 million. The campus was constructed to use geothermal energy. The current campus opened in September 2009, welcoming both the junior and senior high school.

In June 2026, Jackson-Milton's maintenance supervisor David Cameron passed away following an on-campus incident. Cameron was struck in the head by a tree branch. Workers at the school administered CPR. EMS took him to the hospital shortly after.

== Athletics ==
Jackson-Milton High School currently offers:

- Baseball
- Basketball
- Cheerleading
- Cross country
- Football
- Golf
- Soccer
- Softball
- Swimming
- Track and field
- Volleyball
