= Newton Township, Ohio =

Newton Township, Ohio may refer to several places:

- Newton Township, Licking County, Ohio
- Newton Township, Miami County, Ohio
- Newton Township, Muskingum County, Ohio
- Newton Township, Pike County, Ohio
- Newton Township, Trumbull County, Ohio
