= Newton Township, Trumbull County, Ohio =

Township in Ohio, US

- Township
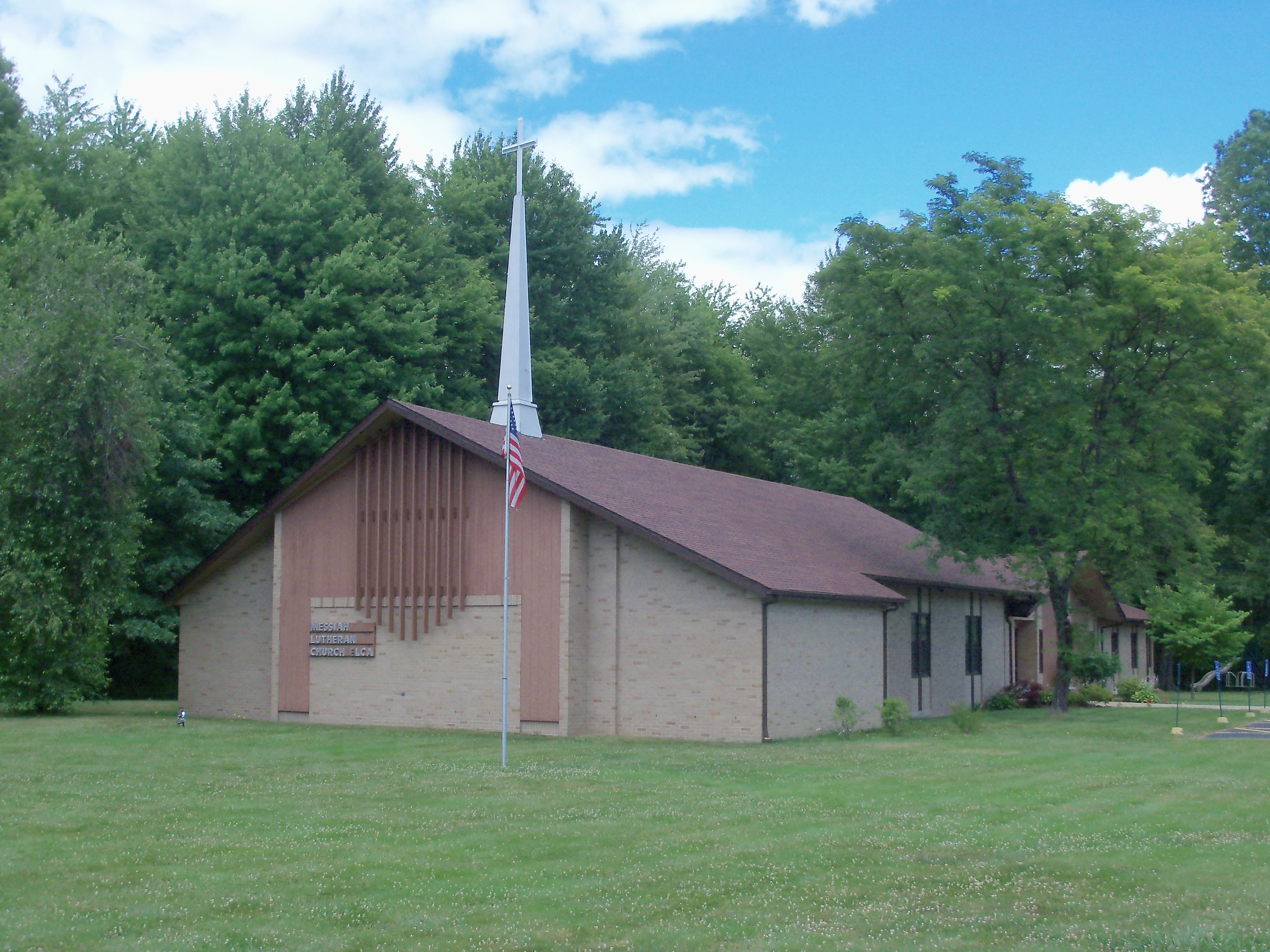
- Messiah Lutheran Church is near the northern boundary of the township

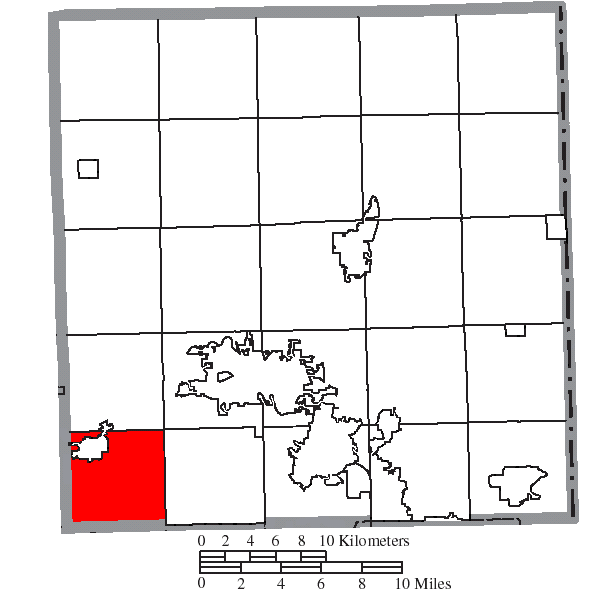
- Location of Newton Township in Trumbull County
- Coordinates: 41°10′57″N 80°57′59″W
- Country: United States
- State: Ohio
- County: Trumbull

Government
  - Type: Trustee

Area
  - Total: 23.5 sq mi (60.8 km^{2})
  - Land: 23.2 sq mi (60.2 km^{2})
  - Water: 0.19 sq mi (0.5 km^{2})
- Elevation: 912 ft (278 m)

Population (2020)
  - Total: 8,618
  - Density: 371/sq mi (143.2/km^{2})
- Time zone: UTC-5 (Eastern (EST))
  - Summer (DST): UTC-4 (EDT)
- FIPS code: 39-55636
- GNIS feature ID: 1087041
- Website: https://www.newtontwptc.org/

Newton Township is one of the twenty-four townships of Trumbull County, Ohio, United States. The 2020 census found 8,618 people in the township.

== Geography ==
Located in the southwestern corner of the county, it borders the following townships and village:

- Braceville Township - north
- Warren Township - northeast corner
- Lordstown - east
- Jackson Township, Mahoning County - southeast corner
- Milton Township, Mahoning County - south
- Palmyra Township, Portage County - southwest corner
- Paris Township, Portage County - west
- Windham Township, Portage County - northwest corner

Most of the city of Newton Falls is located in northwestern Newton Township, and the census-designated place of South Canal lies in the township's west.

== Name and history ==
Newton Township was likely named for Newtown, Connecticut soon after its creation in 1806. It is one of five Newton Townships statewide.

Newton Township was formed from the Connecticut Western Reserve.

== Government ==
The township is governed by a three-member board of trustees, who are elected in November of odd-numbered years to a four-year term beginning on the following January 1. Two are elected in the year after the presidential election and one is elected in the year before it. There is also an elected township fiscal officer, who serves a four-year term beginning on April 1 of the year after the election, which is held in November of the year before the presidential election. Vacancies in the fiscal officership or on the board of trustees are filled by the remaining trustees.
