= Lake Milton State Park =

State park in Ohio, United States

Coordinates: 41.098°N 80.975°W

Lake Milton State Park is in Lake Milton, Ohio. The 1,700 acres (6.9 km^{2}) state park offers boating, swimming, and fishing as well as archery, disc golf, hinting, bird watching, basketball court, sand volleyball court, and mile-long trails There is also a 10 miles (16 km) mountain biking trail. in the winter snowmobiling, cross-country skiing, and ice fishing are offered.

The lake is formed by a dam.

A storybook trail featuring Raindrops to Rainbow by John Micklos Jr opened in 2022. E. coli has been found in the water over various samplings over ten years. In 2020 a man's body was found in the lake.

== See also ==
- Ohio Department of Natural Resources
- List of protected areas of Ohio
