= Lake Milton, Ohio =

- Census-designated place
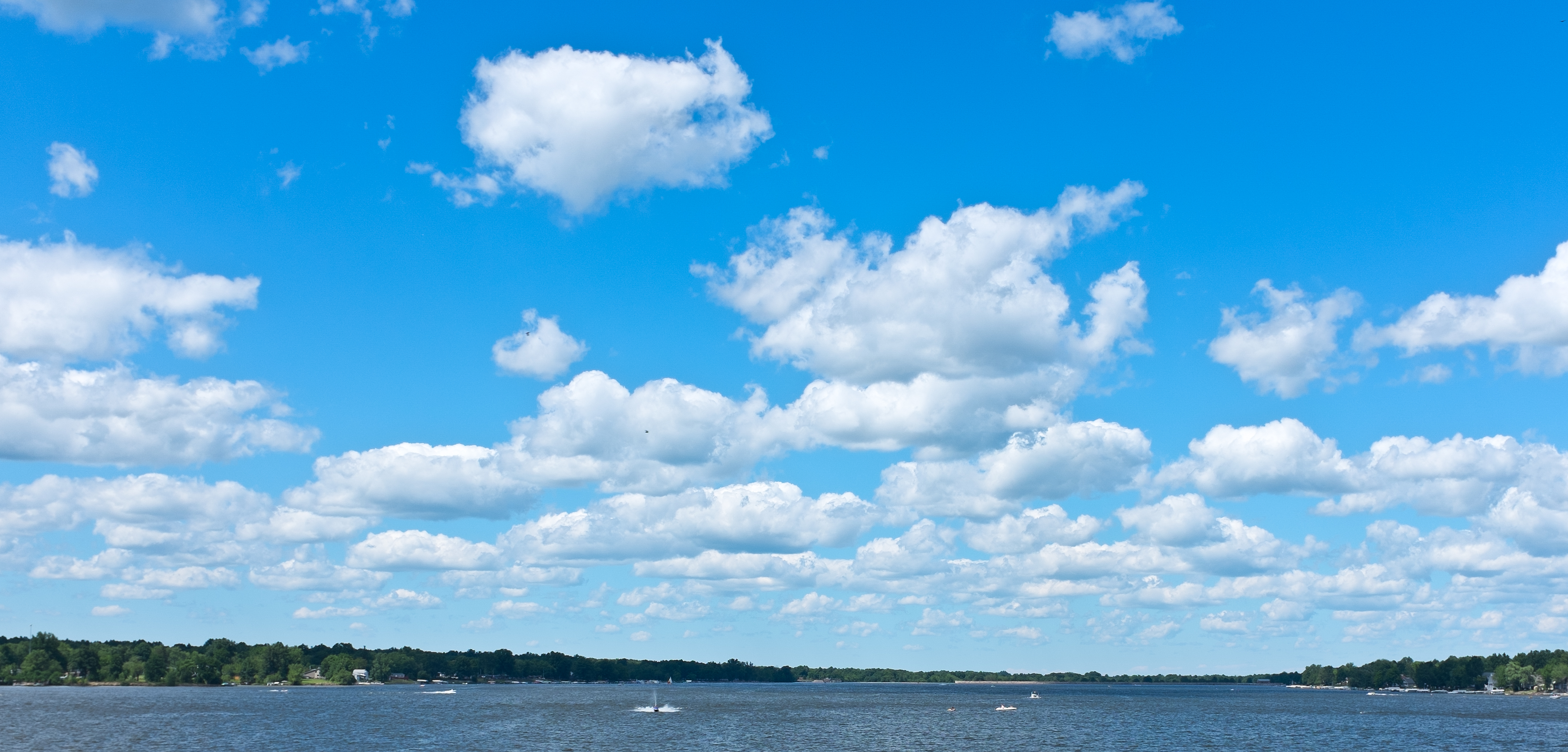
- Lake Milton

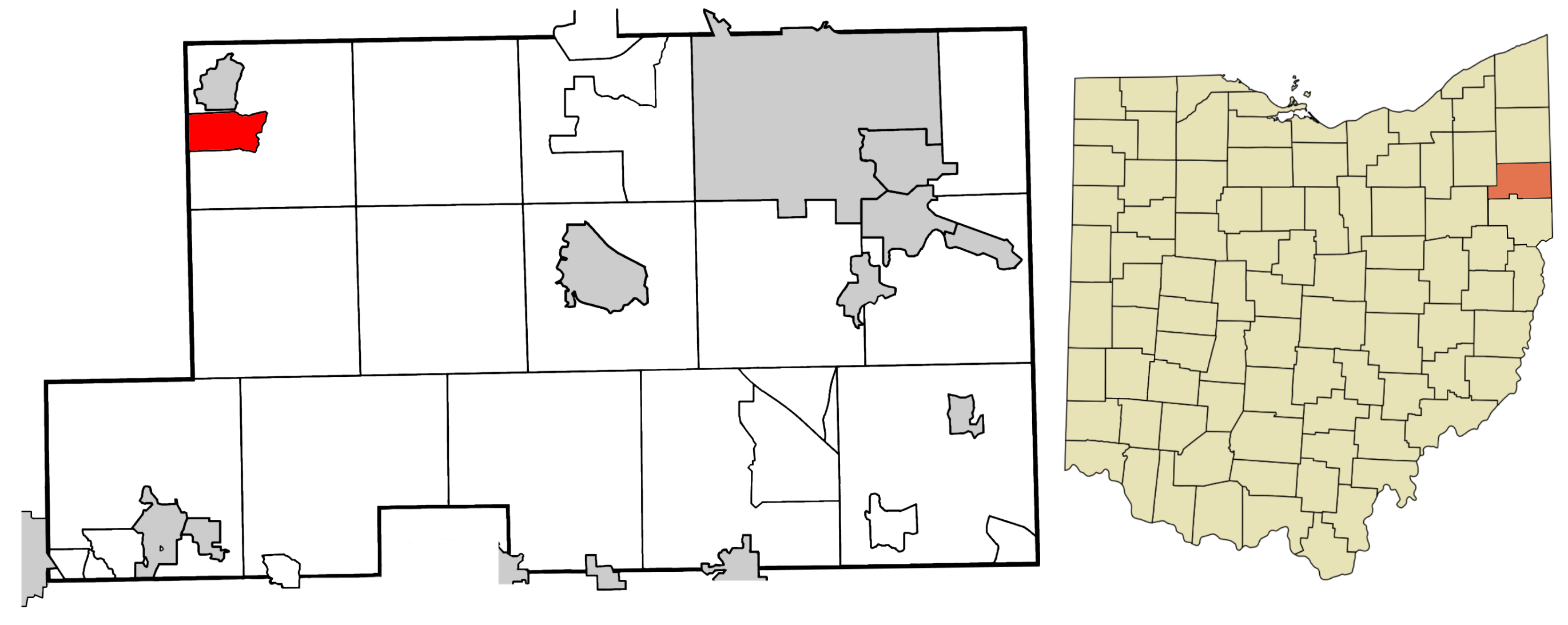
- Location in Mahoning County, Ohio

- Location within Ohio Location within the United States
- Coordinates: 41°05′46″N 80°59′33″W
- Country: United States
- State: Ohio
- County: Mahoning
- Township: Milton

Area
  - Total: 2.46 sq mi (6.36 km^{2})
  - Land: 1.49 sq mi (3.85 km^{2})
  - Water: 0.97 sq mi (2.51 km^{2})
- Elevation: 942 ft (287 m)

Population (2020)
  - Total: 637
  - Density: 428.7/sq mi (165.51/km^{2})
- Time zone: UTC-5 (Eastern (EST))
  - Summer (DST): UTC-4 (EDT)
- ZIP code: 44429
- Area codes: 330, 234
- FIPS code: 39-41440
- GNIS feature ID: 2628919
- School District: Jackson-Milton High School

Lake Milton is a census-designated place in Milton Township, Mahoning County, Ohio, United States. The population was 637 at the 2020 census. The community sits along the shore of the Lake Milton reservoir along with the village of Craig Beach. It is part of the Youngstown–Warren metropolitan area.

== History ==
In 1910, the nearby city of Youngstown acquired 3,416 acres (1,382 ha) along the Mahoning River in Milton Township with the intent to construct a reservoir that would be used as a valuable water supply to cool the city's iron and steel mills. Construction of this reservoir had not yet started by 1913 when the largest flood to date struck the area. Beginning on Easter Sunday of 1913, the rain continued for four days causing the Mahoning River to rise 22 feet (6.7 m) above its normal levels. No fatalities were experienced but the Mahoning Valley’s flooded plains and tributaries caused significant commercial and industrial damage. This increased awareness and need for flood control jump started the construction of the Lake Milton dam later that year. Completed in 1917, the newly constructed 2,800-foot (850 m) dam created 1,640 acres (660 ha) of what is now known as Lake Milton.

In 1984, the then 67-year-old dam needed an estimated $5 million in repairs which the city of Youngstown, the lake's owner, refused to pay. Roughly 1,000 homeowners, cottage leasers, and businesspeople banded together to successfully ask the Ohio General Assembly to provide the money for the repairs. The City of Youngstown, admitting that they could no longer maintain the dam, asked the state to take over the lake as a state park and in the fall of 1988, the Ohio Department of Natural Resources approved to do so.

A post office called Lake Milton has been in operation since 1942, with the ZIP code 44429. The community takes its name from nearby Lake Milton, a reservoir impounded by a dam constructed in 1913, following that year's flood of the Mahoning River.

== Demographics ==
Historical population
Census	Pop.	Note	%±
2020	637		—
U.S. Decennial Census

== Reservoir ==
The lake itself is a relatively shallow lake, with its deepest point being approximately 33 feet (10 m) deep, near the dam. Most of the lake has a depth of 12 to 15 feet (3.7 to 4.6 m). There is a small uninhabited island on the southeast portion of the lake that is a common spot for anchoring and swimming. No wake zones are established along the perimeter of the lake, in the zone between the two bridges, and in the narrow southern end of the lake, commonly referred to as "the river". The dam is at the north end of the lake. The southern end ultimately connects to Berlin Lake although it is not possible to take a power watercraft through this route.

== Recreation ==
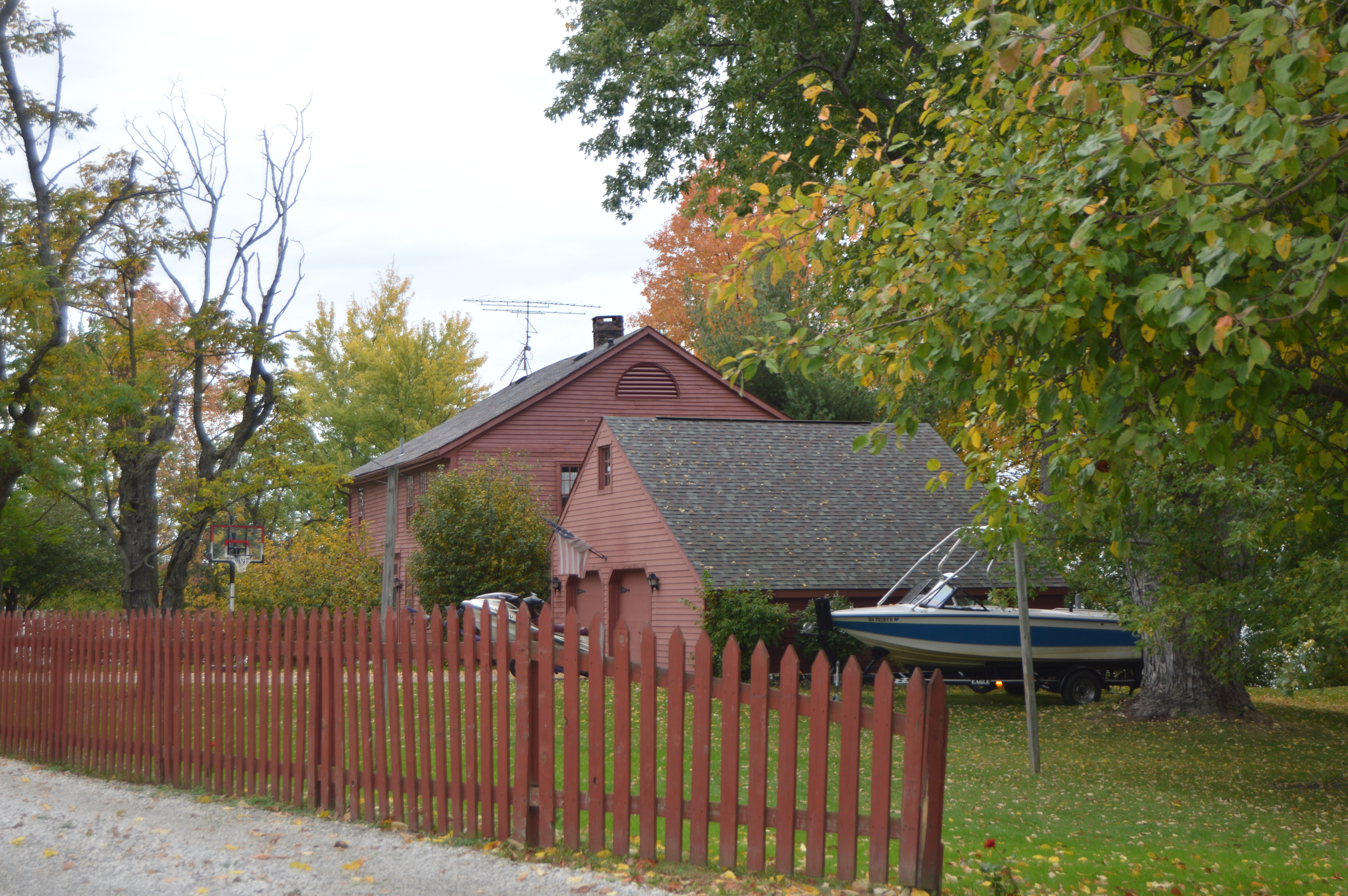
Built in 1811, the Daniel Vaughn Homestead is listed on the National Register of Historic Places.

In 1988, Lake Milton was officially dedicated as Ohio's 72nd state park, as water levels of the lake returned after the dam's repair. The State Park's management afforded the construction of water and sewer lines in 1990, enabling real estate in the area to become more valuable, particularly in the northeast part of the lake. From 2005 – 2007 an additional investment of $20 million for water and sewer projects, expanded such amenities to a much larger portion of the lake and eliminated lake contaminants along with it. Longtime Milton Township zoning inspector Michael Kurilla Jr. cited that lakefront lots once worth $150,000 - $175,000 in 2013 were selling for $525,000 by 2020. Jeff Uroseva, chief building official for Mahoning County shared that residential construction in Milton Township has risen from 5 permits in 2016 to 15 permits in 2020.

Lake Milton State Park is one of the largest lakes in Ohio with unlimited horsepower boating, swimming, and fishing. Activities available in the 1,006-acre (407 ha) park include:

- Archery
- Boating
- Disc Golf
- Fishing
- Hunting
- Reservable Day-use Shelters
- Swimming
- Trails
- Winter Recreation (snowmobiling, skiing, and ice fishing)
- Basketball
- Sand Volleyball
- Playground

Common wildlife to be found around Lake Milton include Cottontail rabbit, Red fox, Raccoon, Muskrat, Woodchuck, Robins, Warblers, Pine siskins, Hawks, Owls, Midland painted turtle, and Northern watersnake.

The park is open from 6 am to 11 pm daily under the supervision of the park's manager.

== Education ==
Children in Lake Milton are served by the public Jackson-Milton Local School District, which includes one elementary school, one middle school, and Jackson-Milton High School.

== Bridges ==
Lake Milton has three bridges. The northern most and largest is known for the fact that it carries Interstate 76 over the lake, many people refer to it as such but its name is the Peter J. Delucia Memorial Bridge. It is so named as Peter Delucia was working on the bridge during its reconstruction in 2003 when he was electrocuted. The stringer bridge has 18 spans for a length of 2,095 feet (639 m) and was originally constructed in 1967. The second longest bridge is the Mahoning Ave bridge. It is also a stringer bridge like Delucia but much shorter at just 832 feet (254 m) across five spans. It was originally built in 1915 and reconstructed in 1991. The third bridge is Ellsworth Road going over the very southern end of the lake.
