= Ellsworth Township, Ohio =

Township in Ohio, US

Ellsworth Township, Mahoning County, Ohio
- Township
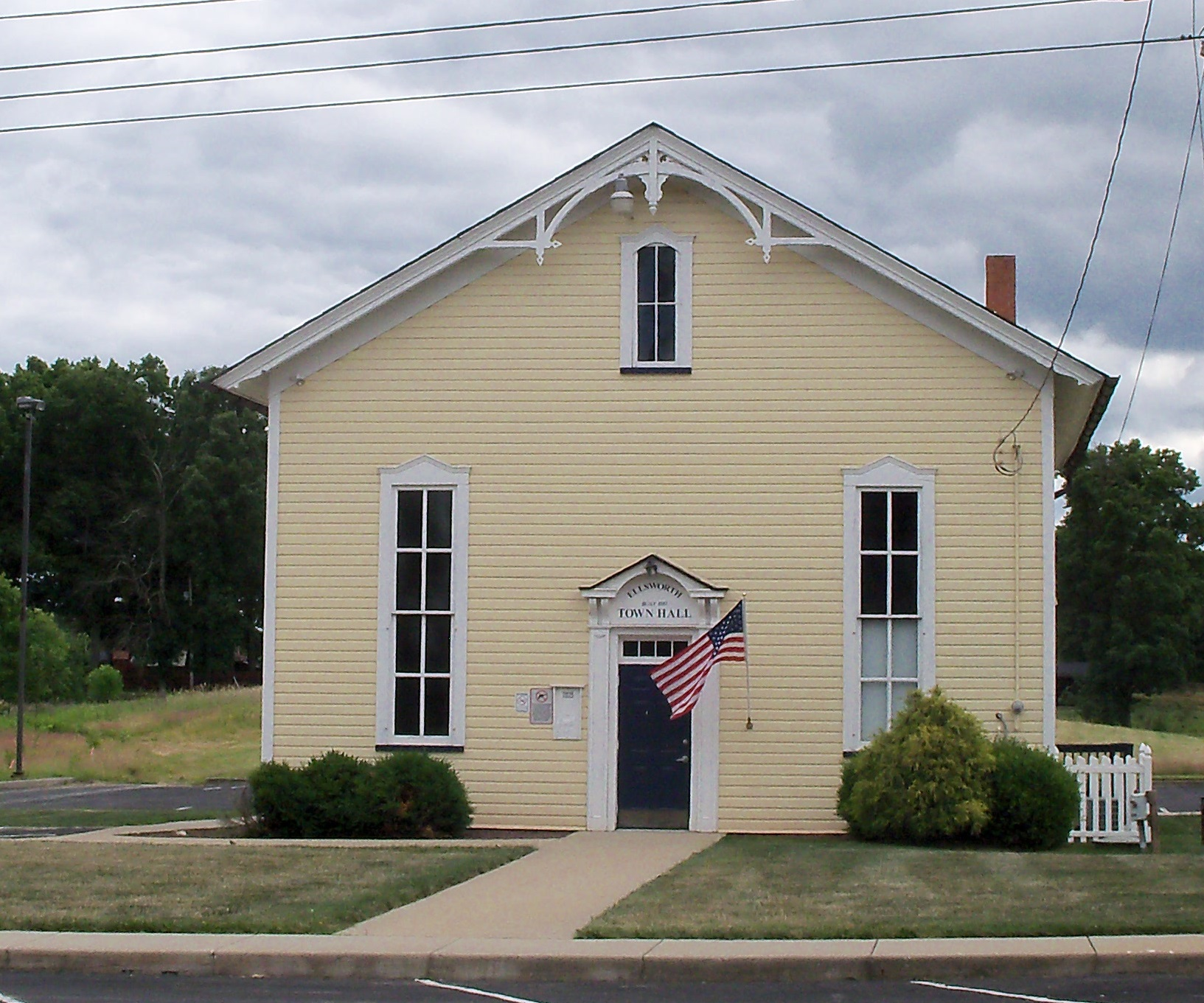
- Ellsworth Town Hall

- Flag

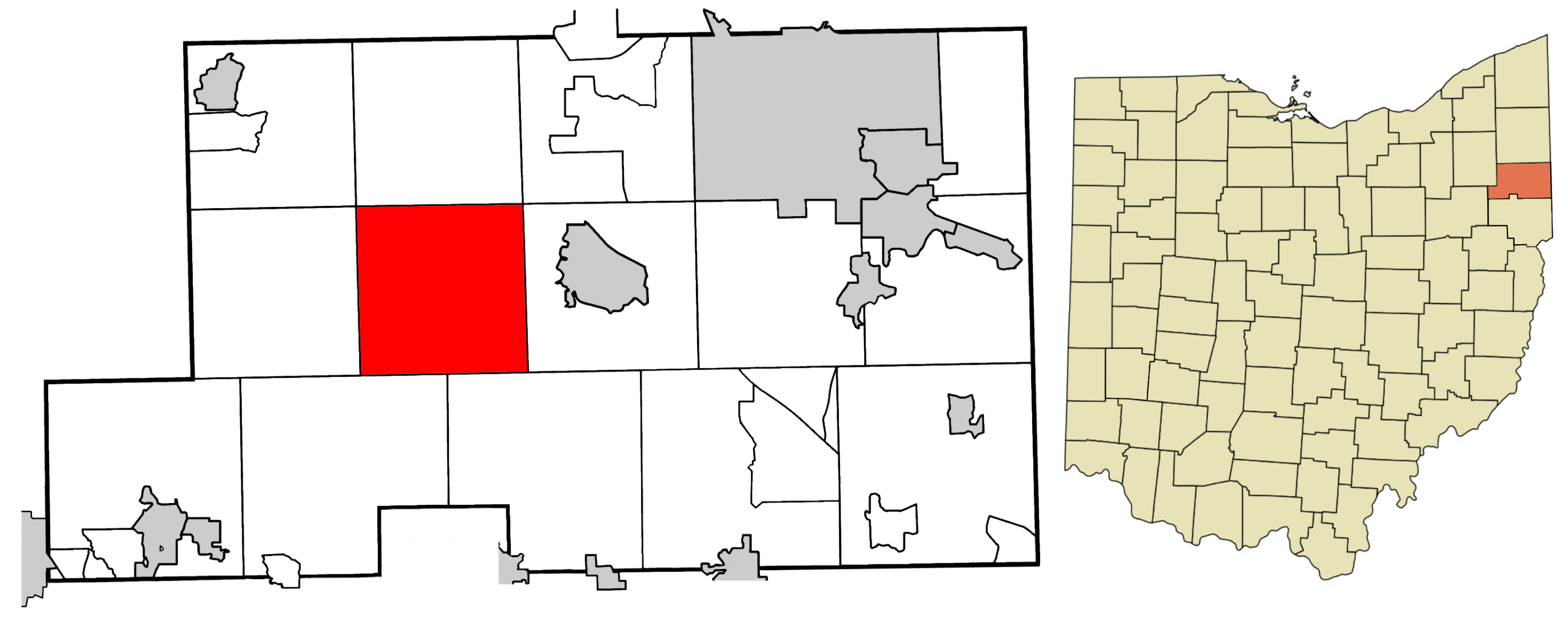
- Location of Ellsworth Township in Mahoning County
- Coordinates: 41°2′21″N 80°50′52″W
- Country: United States
- State: Ohio
- County: Mahoning

Area
  - Total: 25.7 sq mi (66.6 km^{2})
  - Land: 25.4 sq mi (65.7 km^{2})
  - Water: 0.35 sq mi (0.9 km^{2})
- Elevation: 1,060 ft (323 m)

Population (2020)
  - Total: 2,128
  - Density: 83.9/sq mi (32.4/km^{2})
- Time zone: UTC-5 (Eastern (EST))
  - Summer (DST): UTC-4 (EDT)
- ZIP code: 44416
- Area codes: 234/330
- FIPS code: 39-25088
- GNIS feature ID: 1086562
- Website: www.ellsworthohio.com

Ellsworth Township is one of the fourteen townships of Mahoning County, Ohio, United States. The 2020 census found 2,128 people in the township.

== Geography ==
Located in the central part of the county, it borders the following townships:

- Jackson Township - north
- Austintown Township - northeast corner
- Canfield Township - east
- Green Township - southeast
- Goshen Township - southwest
- Berlin Township - west
- Milton Township - northwest corner

No municipalities are located in Ellsworth Township, although the unincorporated community of Ellsworth lies at the center of the township.

== Name and history ==
Ellsworth Township was established in 1810. Ellsworth is the name of a "prominent citizen of Connecticut".

It is the only Ellsworth Township statewide.

== Government ==
The township is governed by a three-member board of trustees, who are elected in November of odd-numbered years to a four-year term beginning on the following January 1. Two are elected in the year after the presidential election and one is elected in the year before it. There is also an elected township fiscal officer, who serves a four-year term beginning on April 1 of the year after the election, which is held in November of the year before the presidential election. Vacancies in the fiscal officership or on the board of trustees are filled by the remaining trustees.
