= Ellsworth, Ohio =

Unincorporated community in Ohio, U.S.

- Unincorporated community
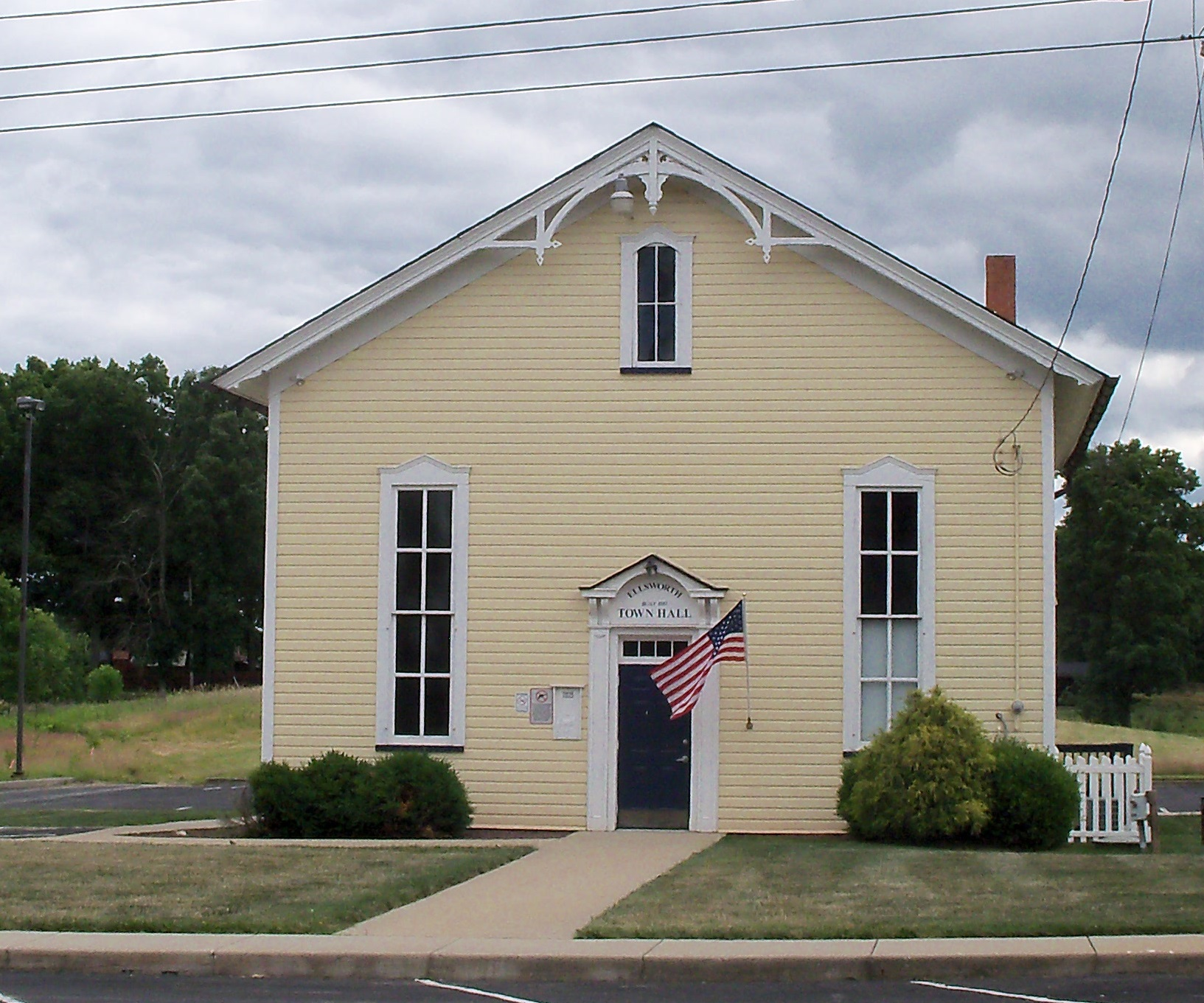
- Ellsworth Town Hall

- Location within Ohio Location within the United States
- Country: United States
- State: Ohio
- County: Mahoning
- Township: Ellsworth
- Elevation: 1,050 ft (320 m)
- Time zone: UTC-5 (Eastern (EST))
  - Summer (DST): UTC-4 (EDT)
- ZIP Code: 44416
- Area codes: 330, 234
- GNIS feature ID: 1064614

Ellsworth is an unincorporated community in central Ellsworth Township, Ohio, United States. It is part of the Youngstown–Warren metropolitan area. It lies at the intersection of U.S. Route 224 and State Route 45, and has a post office with the ZIP code 44416.

== History ==
The community has the name of Oliver Ellsworth, a Connecticut politician and local landowner. A variant name was Ellsworth Center. A post office was established at Ellsworth in 1819. Besides the post office, Ellsworth Center had a sawmill and a station on the Pennsylvania Railroad.
