= North Jackson, Ohio =

- Unincorporated community
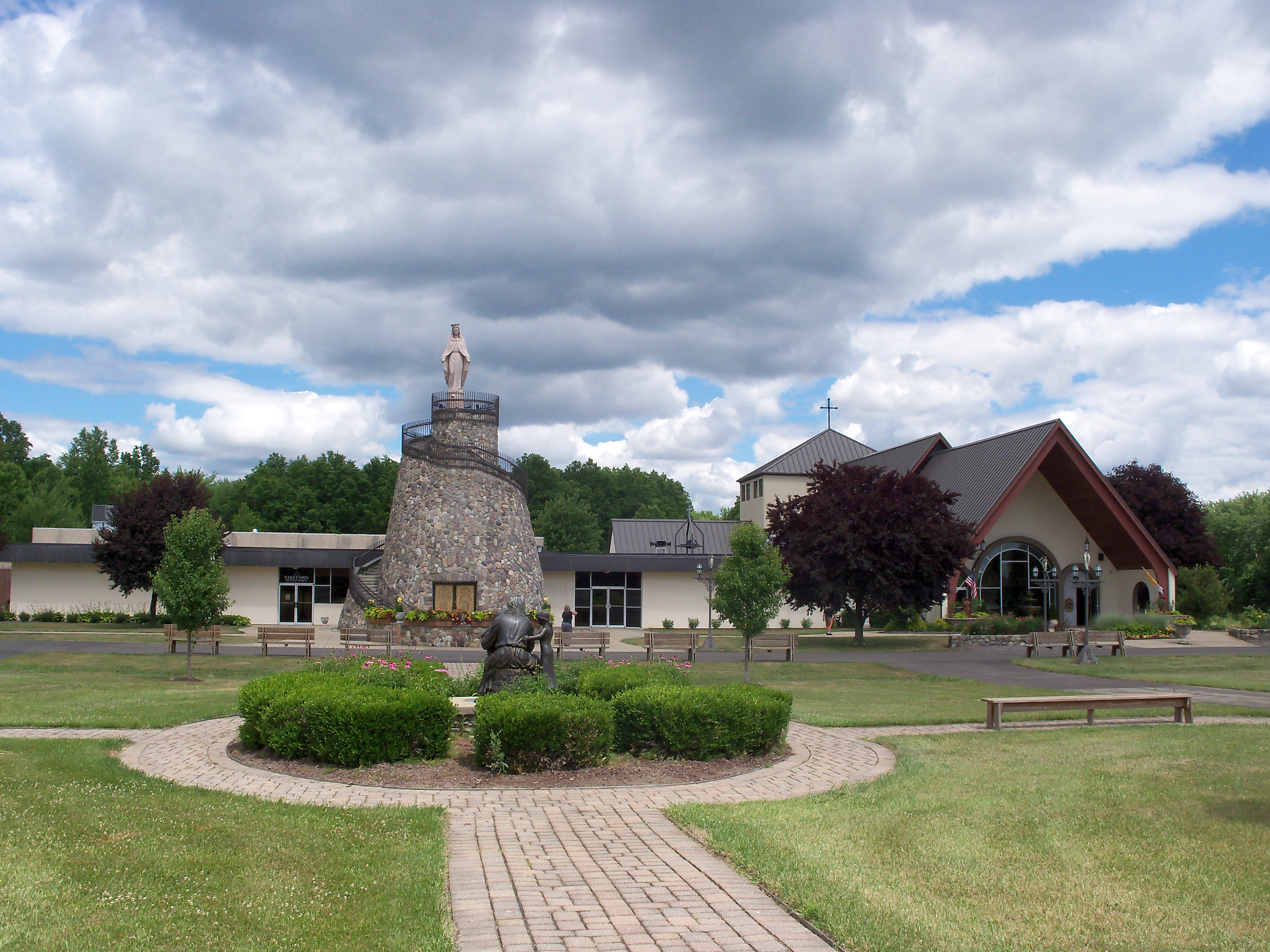
- Basilica and National Shrine of Our Lady of Lebanon

- Location within Ohio Location within the United States
- Coordinates: 41°06′00″N 80°51′26″W
- Country: United States
- State: Ohio
- County: Mahoning
- Township: Jackson
- Elevation: 1,020 ft (310 m)
- ZIP code: 44451
- GNIS feature ID: 1065169

North Jackson is an unincorporated community in central Jackson Township, Mahoning County, Ohio, United States. It lies along State Route 45 between Salem and Warren. It is part of the Youngstown–Warren metropolitan area. North Jackson is the site of a Marian shrine of the Catholic Church, the Basilica and National Shrine of Our Lady of Lebanon.

== History ==
A post office called North Jackson has been in operation since 1837, with the ZIP code 44451. Besides the post office, North Jackson had a station on the Pennsylvania Railroad. A variant name was Jackson Center.

== Education ==
Children in North Jackson are served by the Jackson-Milton Local School District. The current schools serving North Jackson are:

- Jackson-Milton Elementary School – grades K-5
- Jackson-Milton Middle School – grades 6-8
- Jackson-Milton High School – grades 9-12

North Jackson has a public library, a branch of the Public Library of Youngstown and Mahoning County.

== See also ==
- Universal Stainless
