= South Canal, Ohio =

- Census-designated place
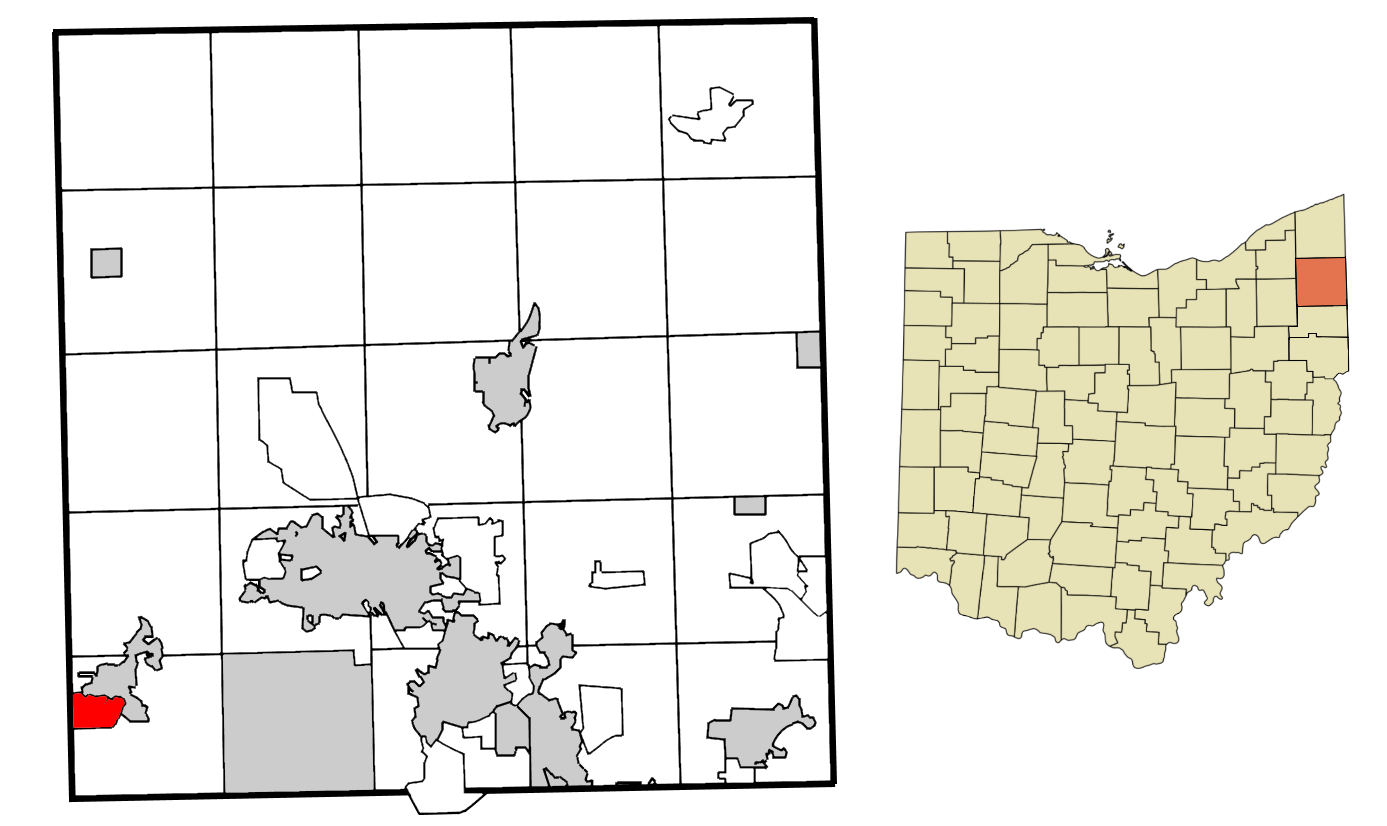
- Location of South Canal in Trumbull County, Ohio.
- Coordinates: 41°10′34″N 80°59′12″W
- Country: United States
- State: Ohio
- County: Trumbull

Area
  - Total: 1.71 sq mi (4.44 km^{2})
  - Land: 1.69 sq mi (4.37 km^{2})
  - Water: 0.027 sq mi (0.07 km^{2})
- Elevation: 932 ft (284 m)

Population (2020)
  - Total: 1,101
  - Density: 652.3/sq mi (251.84/km^{2})
- Time zone: UTC-5 (Eastern (EST))
  - Summer (DST): UTC-4 (EDT)
- FIPS code: 39-73118
- GNIS feature ID: 2393239

South Canal is an unincorporated community and census-designated place in western Newton Township, Trumbull County, Ohio, United States. The population was 1,101 at the 2020 census. It is part of the Youngstown–Warren metropolitan area.

== Geography ==
According to the United States Census Bureau, the CDP has a total area of 1.7 square miles (4.4 km^{2}), of which 1.6 square miles (4.1 km^{2}) is land and 0.04 square miles (0.10 km^{2}) (2.41%) is water.

== Demographics ==
Historical population
Census	Pop.	Note	%±
2000	1,346		—
2010	1,100		−18.3%
2020	1,101		0.1%
U.S. Decennial Census

As of the census of 2000, there were 1,346 people, 478 households, and 383 families residing in the CDP. The population density was 830.9 inhabitants per square mile (320.8/km^{2}). There were 493 housing units at an average density of 304.3 per square mile (117.5/km^{2}). The racial makeup of the CDP was 98.51% White, 0.30% African American, 0.07% Native American, 0.07% Asian, and 1.04% from two or more races. Hispanic or Latino of any race were 0.59% of the population.

There were 478 households, out of which 31.0% had children under the age of 18 living with them, 68.8% were married couples living together, 8.4% had a female householder with no husband present, and 19.7% were non-families. 17.8% of all households were made up of individuals, and 9.8% had someone living alone who was 65 years of age or older. The average household size was 2.66 and the average family size was 3.02.

In the CDP the population was spread out, with 21.9% under the age of 18, 6.5% from 18 to 24, 24.1% from 25 to 44, 27.3% from 45 to 64, and 20.1% who were 65 years of age or older. The median age was 43 years. For every 100 females there were 92.3 males. For every 100 females age 18 and over, there were 89.0 males.

The median income for a household in the CDP was $45,417, and the median income for a family was $53,438. Males had a median income of $41,250 versus $24,141 for females. The per capita income for the CDP was $19,253. About 1.3% of families and 3.9% of the population were below the poverty line, including none of those under age 18 and 14.7% of those age 65 or over.
