= Basilica and National Shrine of Our Lady of Lebanon (North Jackson, Ohio) =

Maronite Catholic basilica in the US

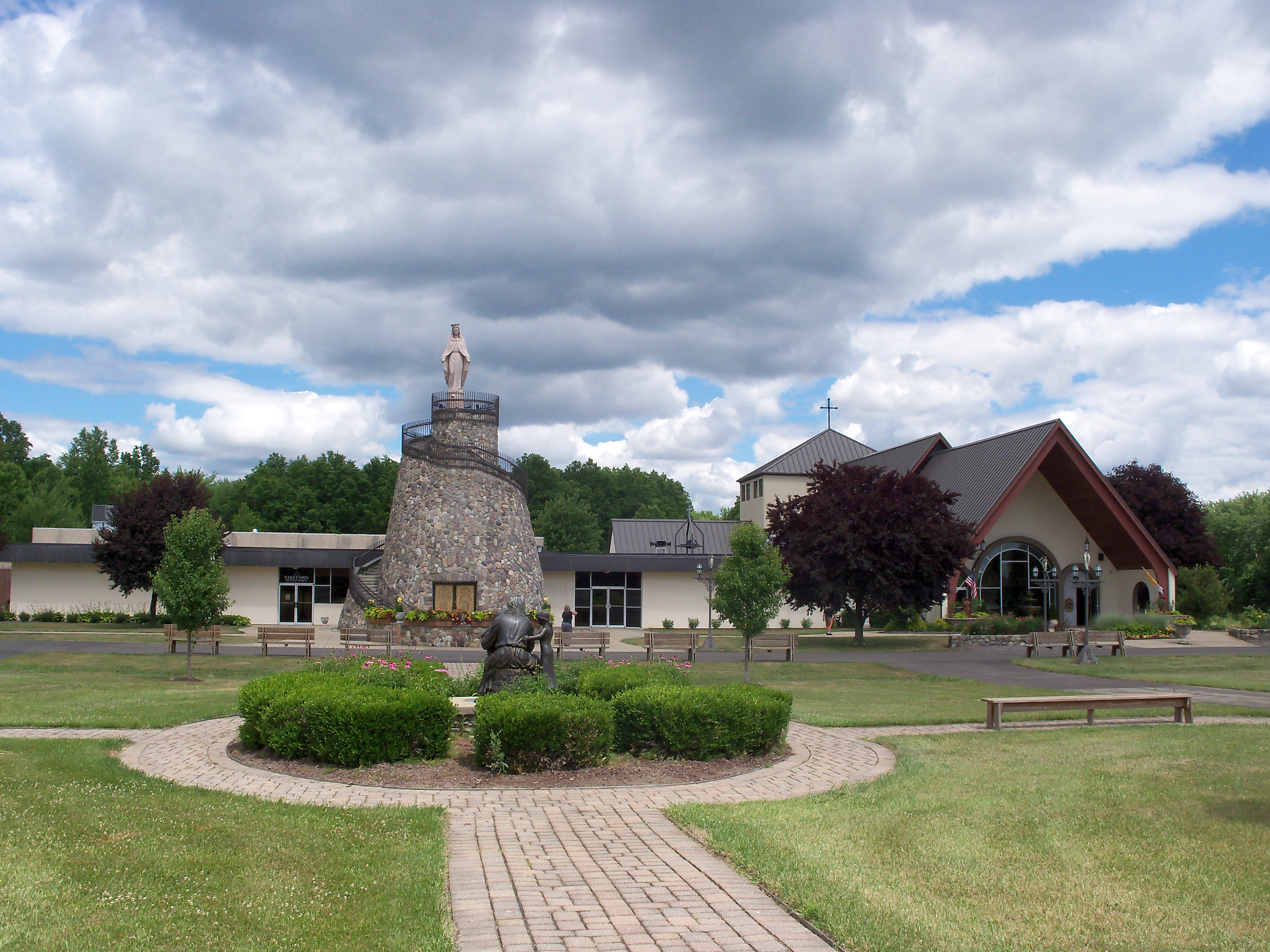

- Location in Ohio
- 41°07′50″N 80°49′17″W
- Location: 2759 N. Lipkey Rd. North Jackson, Ohio
- Country: United States
- Denomination: Catholic Church
- Sui iuris church: Maronite Church
- Website: ourladyoflebanonshrine.com

History
- Founded: 1963
- Founder: Msgr. Peter Eid
- Dedicated: August 15, 1965

Architecture
- Functional status: Minor basilica
- Groundbreaking: August 16, 1964
- Completed: 1965
- Construction cost: $200,000

Administration
- Diocese: Eparchy of Our Lady of Lebanon

Clergy
- Bishop: Most Rev. Abdallah Elias Zaidan
- Rector: Fr. Michael Shami

The Basilica and National Shrine of Our Lady of Lebanon is a minor basilica of the Maronite Catholic Church located in North Jackson, Ohio, United States. It is under the jurisdiction of the Eparchy of Our Lady of Lebanon.

== History ==
The first proposal to establish a shrine to Our Lady of Lebanon was initiated in 1960 between the Maronite priests of the United States and Archbishop Patrick O'Boyle of Washington. Nothing came of that proposal so the Rev. Peter Eid suggested that the Maronites from the Youngstown, Ohio area build the shrine. He bought 80 acres (32 ha) in 1961 and the shrine was established two years later in 1963. Ground for the building was broken on August 16, 1964, and the statue of the Virgin Mary was placed on the tower on July 20. 1965. The shrine is a replica of the original shrine in Harissa, Lebanon. The facility was completed for $200,000 and it was dedicated by Auxiliary Bishop James Malone of the Roman Catholic Diocese of Youngstown on Sunday, August 15, 1965. Pope Francis decreed on July 8, 2014, that the shrine was elevated to the status of a minor basilica.
