= Milton Township, Mahoning County, Ohio =

Township in Ohio, US

Milton Township
- Township
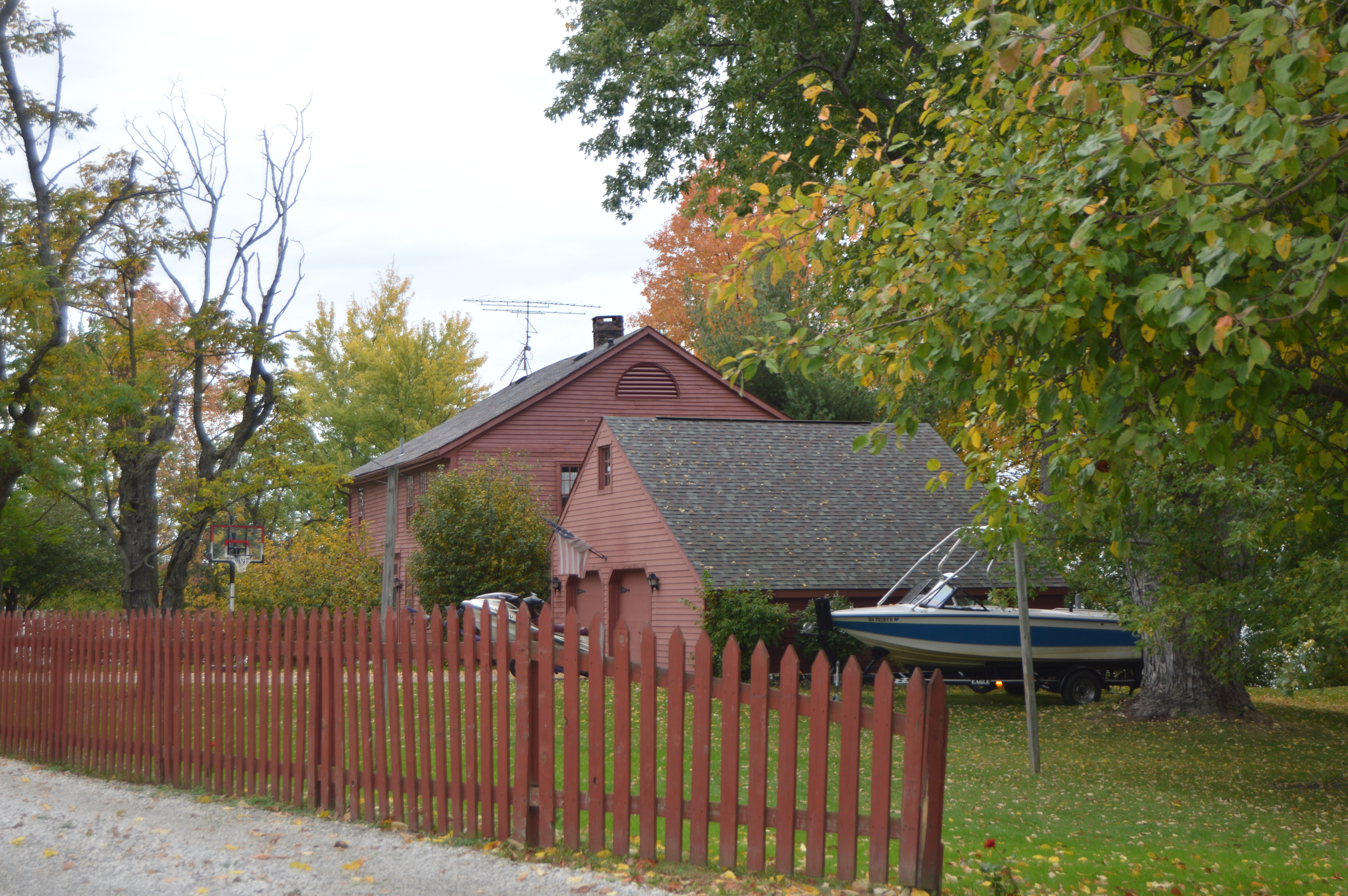
- The Daniel Vaughn Homestead on the western side of Lake Milton

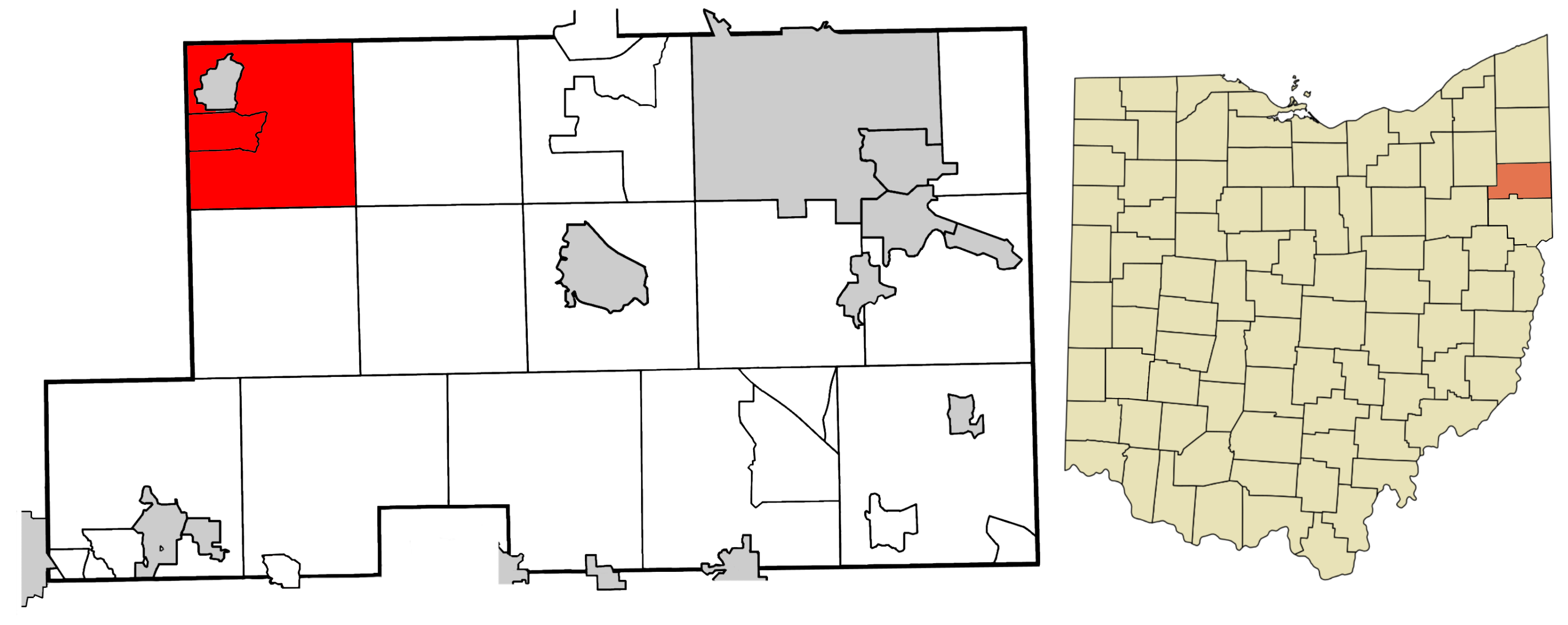
- Location of Milton Township in Mahoning County
- Coordinates: 41°5′59″N 80°58′19″W
- Country: United States
- State: Ohio
- County: Mahoning

Area
  - Total: 25.3 sq mi (65.6 km^{2})
  - Land: 22.5 sq mi (58.2 km^{2})
  - Water: 2.9 sq mi (7.4 km^{2})
- Elevation: 965 ft (294 m)

Population (2020)
  - Total: 3,565
  - Density: 159/sq mi (61.3/km^{2})
- Time zone: UTC-5 (Eastern (EST))
  - Summer (DST): UTC-4 (EDT)
- FIPS code: 39-50638
- GNIS feature ID: 1086566
- Website: www.miltontownshipohio.org

Milton Township is one of the fourteen townships of Mahoning County, Ohio, United States. The 2020 census found 3,565 people in the township.

== Geography ==
Located in the northwestern corner of the county, it borders the following townships:

- Newton Township, Trumbull County - north
- Lordstown - northeast corner
- Jackson Township - east
- Ellsworth Township - southeast corner
- Berlin Township - south
- Deerfield Township, Portage County - southwest corner
- Palmyra Township, Portage County - west
- Paris Township, Portage County - northwest corner

The village of Craig Beach is located in northwestern Milton Township, and the census-designated place of Lake Milton lies at the center of the township. Both are resort communities which developed around a reservoir which is now the primary feature of Lake Milton State Park.

== Name and history ==
It is one of five Milton Townships statewide.

== Government ==
The township is governed by a three-member board of trustees, who are elected in November of odd-numbered years to a four-year term beginning on the following January 1. Two are elected in the year after the presidential election and one is elected in the year before it. There is also an elected township fiscal officer, who serves a four-year term beginning on April 1 of the year after the election, which is held in November of the year before the presidential election. Vacancies in the fiscal officership or on the board of trustees are filled by the remaining trustees.
