= Jackson Township, Mahoning County, Ohio =

Township in Ohio, US

- Township
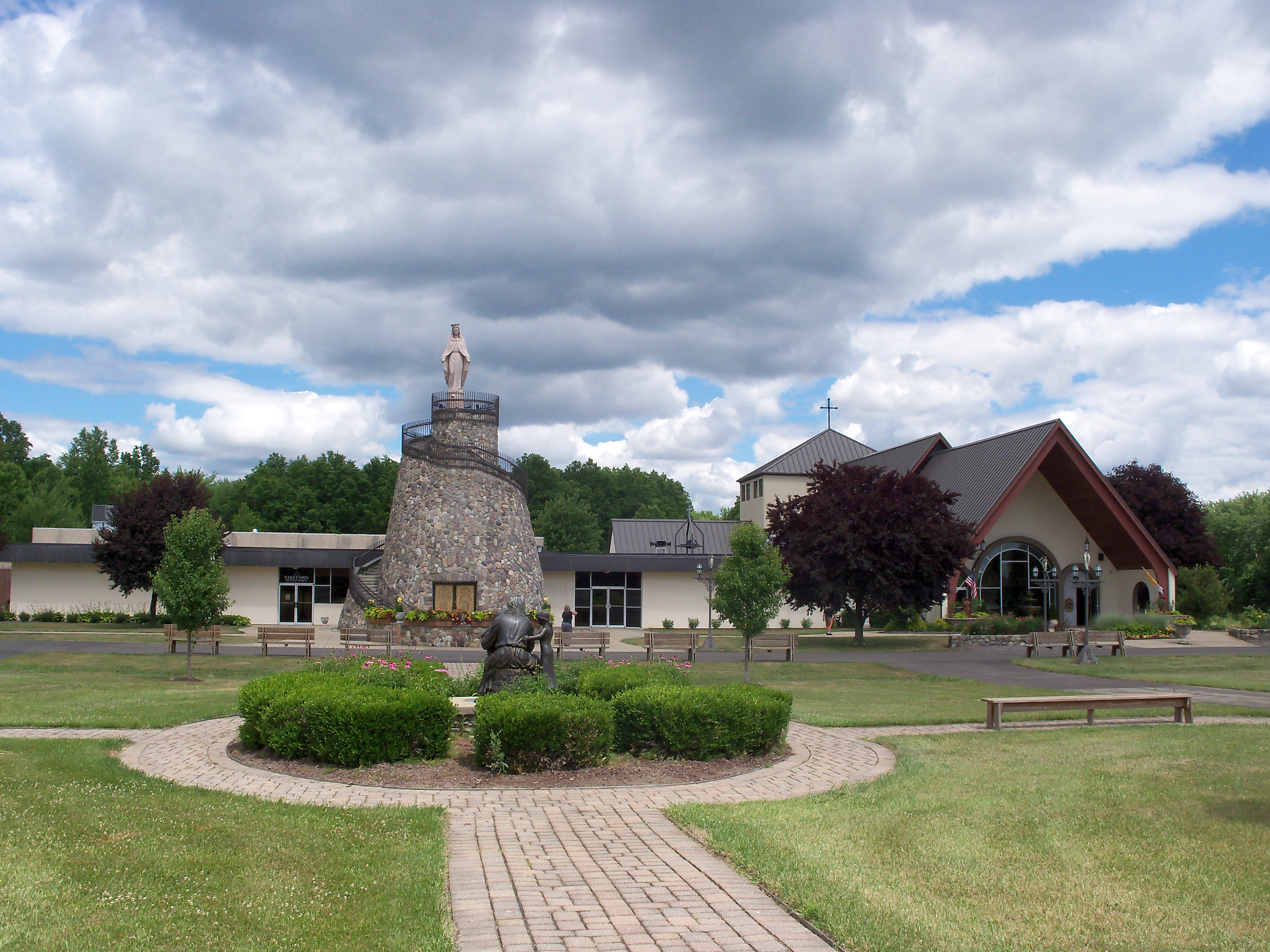
- Basilica and National Shrine of Our Lady of Lebanon

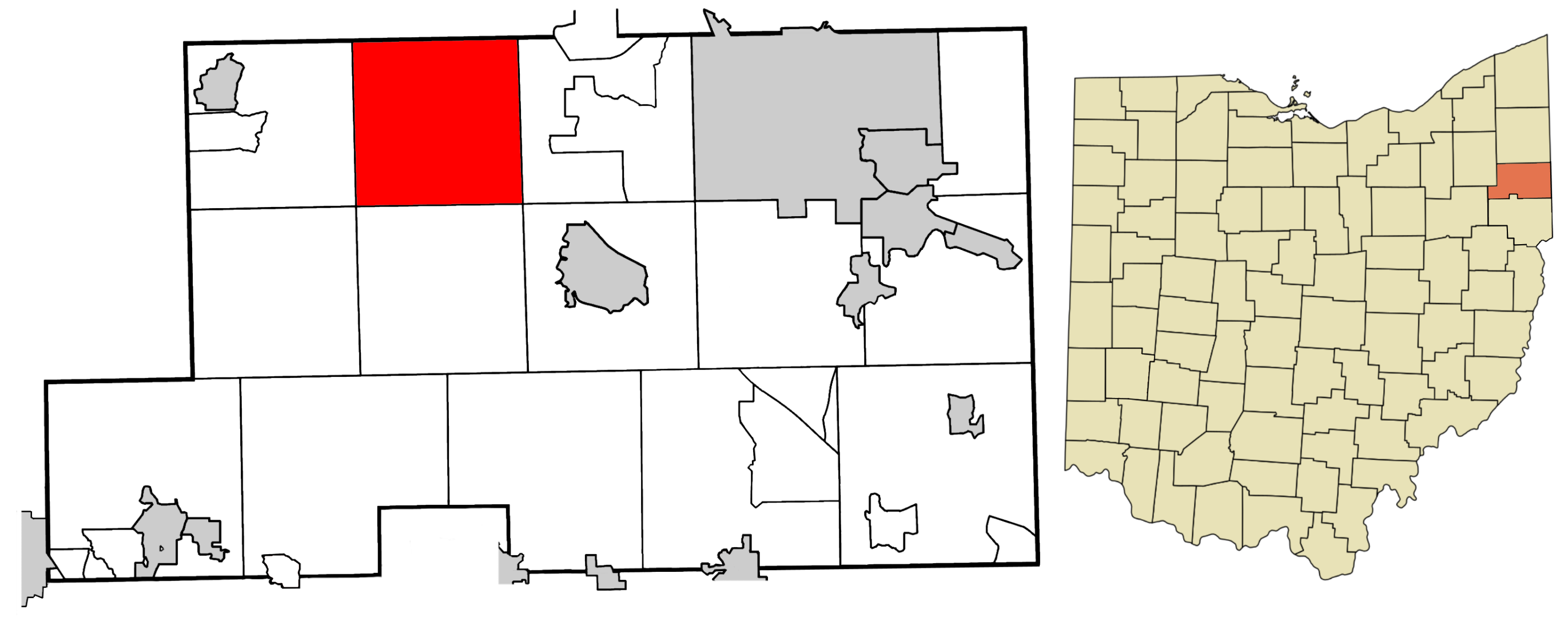
- Location of Jackson Township in Mahoning County
- Coordinates: 41°6′14″N 80°51′28″W
- Country: United States
- State: Ohio
- County: Mahoning

Area
  - Total: 24.5 sq mi (63.5 km^{2})
  - Land: 24.0 sq mi (62.2 km^{2})
  - Water: 0.50 sq mi (1.3 km^{2})
- Elevation: 1,020 ft (311 m)

Population (2020)
  - Total: 2,124
  - Density: 88.4/sq mi (34.1/km^{2})
- Time zone: UTC-5 (Eastern (EST))
  - Summer (DST): UTC-4 (EDT)
- FIPS code: 39-37884
- GNIS feature ID: 1086565
- Website: www.jacksontwp.net

Jackson Township is one of the fourteen townships of Mahoning County, Ohio, United States. The 2020 census found 2,124 people in the township.

== Geography ==
Located in the northern part of the county, it borders the following townships:

- Lordstown - north
- Weathersfield Township, Trumbull County - northeast corner
- Austintown Township - east
- Canfield Township - southeast corner
- Ellsworth Township - south
- Berlin Township - southwest corner
- Milton Township - west
- Newton Township, Trumbull County - northwest corner

No municipalities are located in Jackson Township, although the unincorporated community of North Jackson lies at the center of the township.

== Name and history ==
At first, the area of Jackson Township was called West Austintown and was first organized in 1815. It was later named Jackson Township after Andrew Jackson. It is one of thirty-seven Jackson Townships statewide.

After the Treaty of Greenville in 1795, settlers began purchasing and settling the area. In 1795, the first settlers in Mahoning County were John Young and Colonel James Hillman, who built a log cabin on the east bank of the Mahoning River in Youngstown. The first settlers of the area that would become known as Jackson Township included Samuel Calhoun, Andrew Gault, William Orr, James Starnford, Samuel Riddle, and Joseph McInrue.

== Government ==
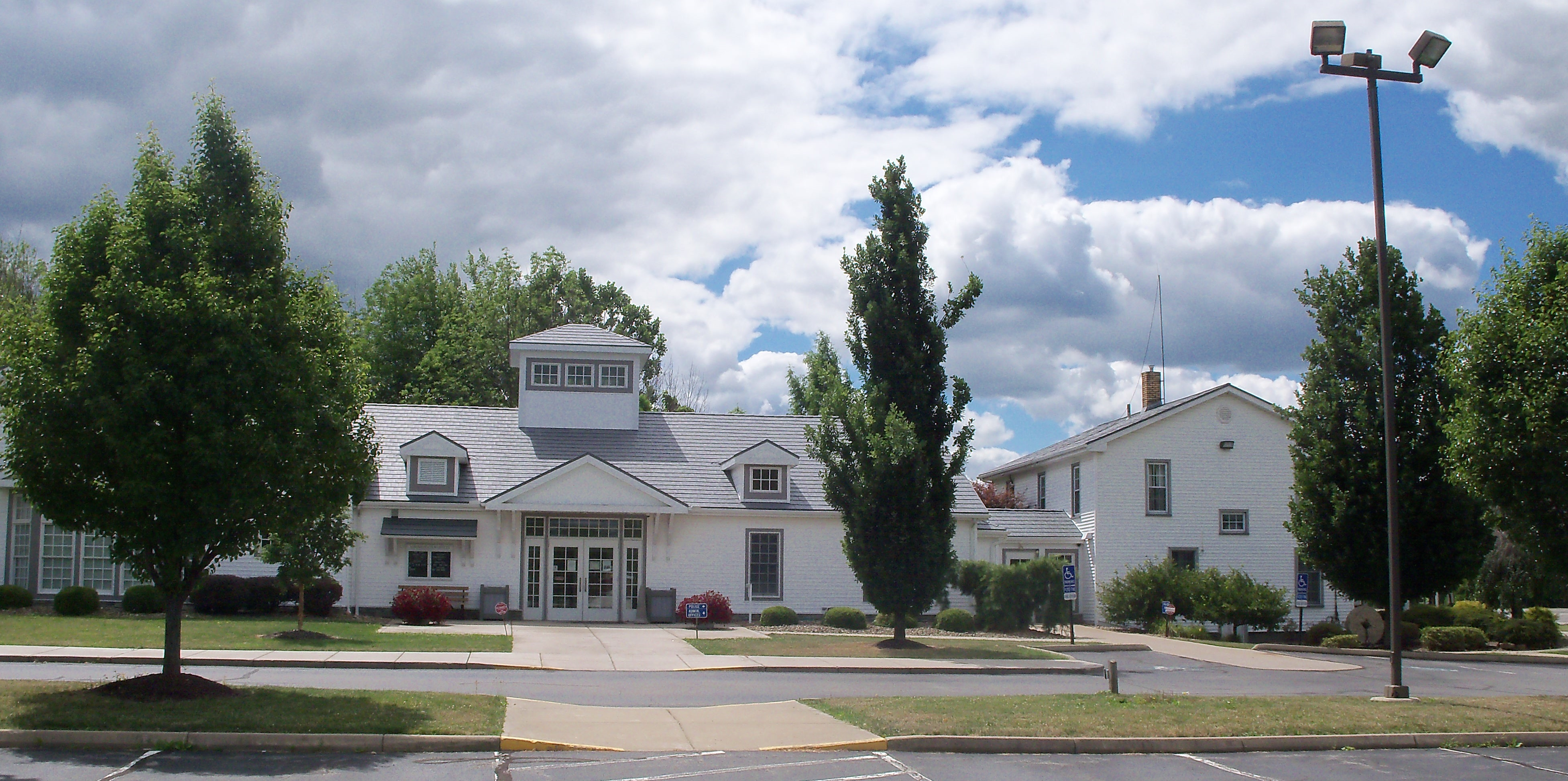
Jackson Town Hall

The township is governed by a three-member board of trustees, who are elected in November of odd-numbered years to a four-year term beginning on the following January 1. Two are elected in the year after the presidential election and one is elected in the year before it. There is also an elected township fiscal officer, who serves a four-year term beginning on April 1 of the year after the election, which is held in November of the year before the presidential election. Vacancies in the fiscal officership or on the board of trustees are filled by the remaining trustees.
