= Apostolic nunciature =

Official diplomatic representation of the Holy See

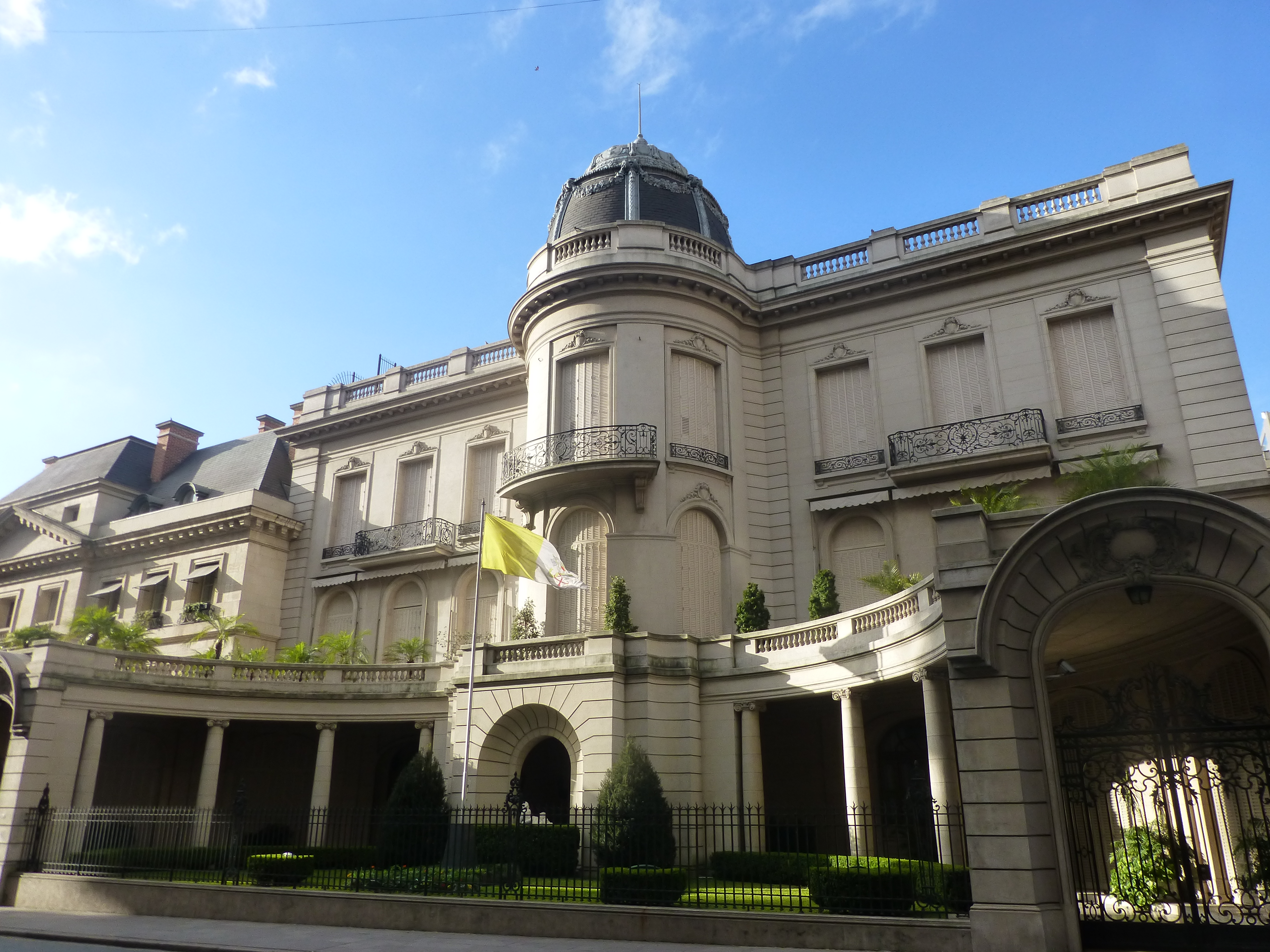
Apostolic nunciature in Buenos Aires, Argentina

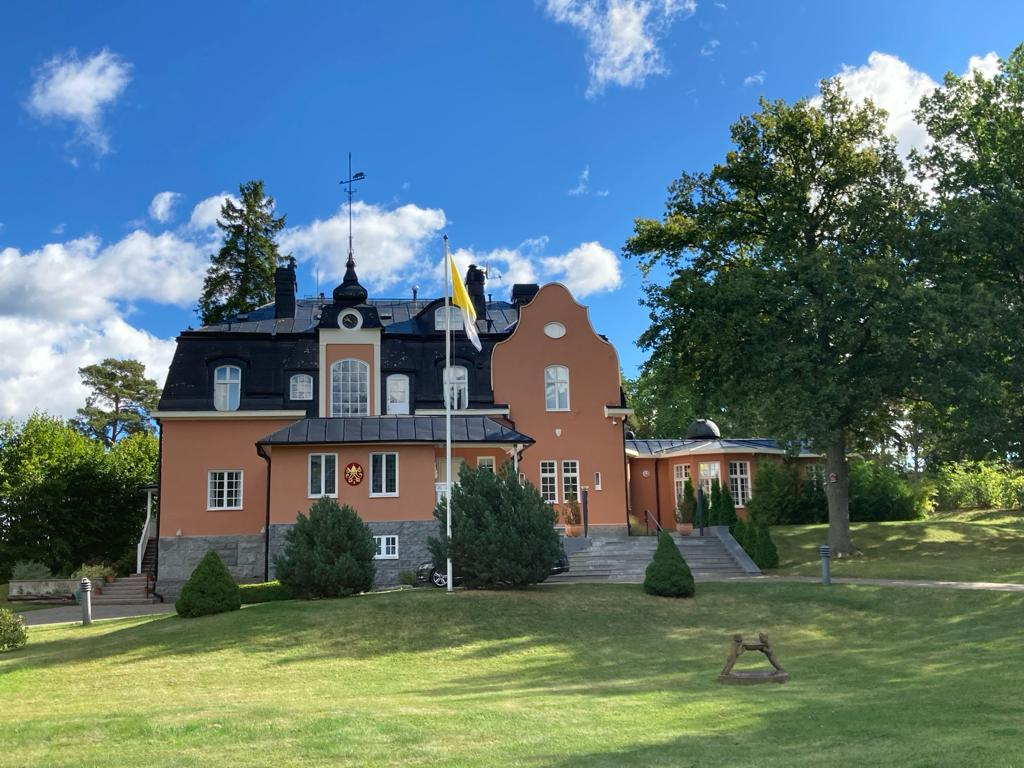
Apostolic nunciature in Djursholm, Sweden

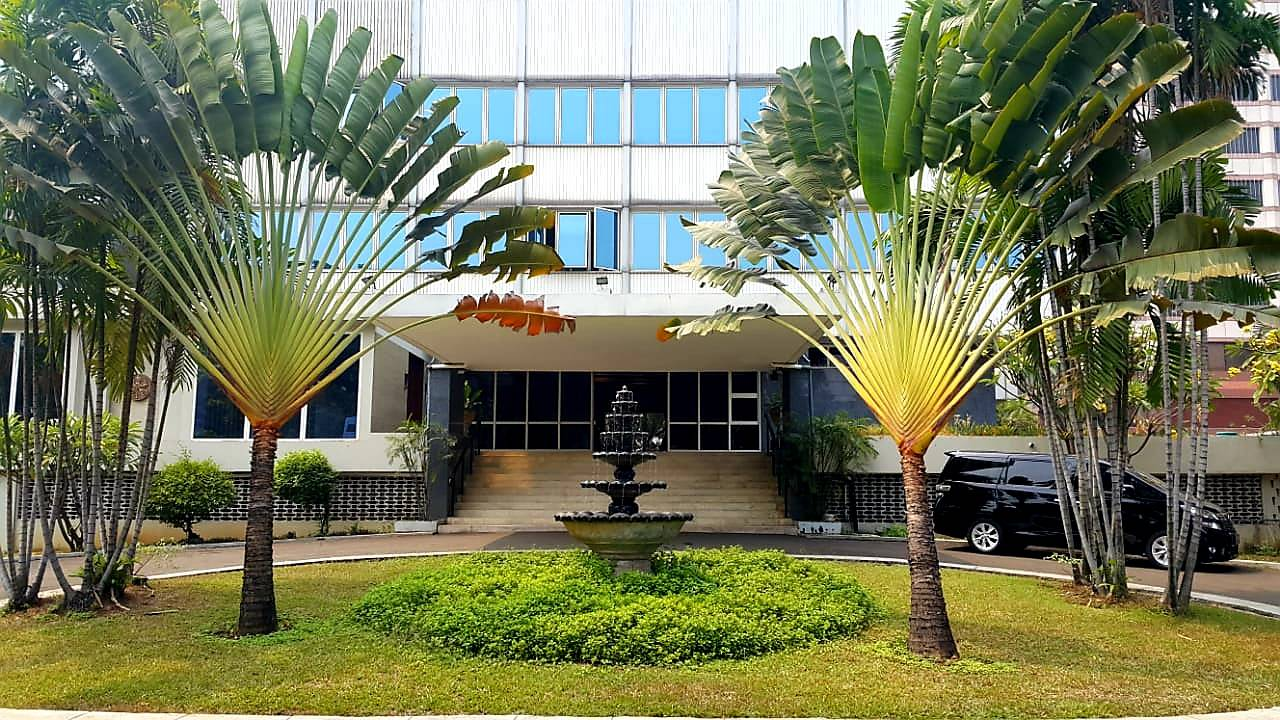
Apostolic nunciature in Jakarta, Indonesia

An apostolic nunciature (Latin: Nuntiatura Apostolica) is the highest-level diplomatic mission of the Holy See and functions in a manner similar to an embassy. Unlike embassies, however, apostolic nunciatures do not issue visas and do not maintain consulates.

The head of an apostolic nunciature is the apostolic nuncio, commonly referred to as a papal nuncio. A nuncio is the Holy See’s permanent diplomatic representative to a state or to certain international intergovernmental organizations, notably the European Union and ASEAN. Nuncios hold the rank of ambassador extraordinary and plenipotentiary and, in ecclesiastical terms, are usually titular archbishops. Papal envoys to other international organizations who do not serve as heads of mission are typically designated as "permanent observers" or "delegates".

In a number of countries with diplomatic relations with the Holy See, the apostolic nuncio serves ex officio as the doyen of the diplomatic corps. In these states, the nuncio holds the highest precedence among accredited diplomats and may speak on behalf of the diplomatic corps on matters of protocol and diplomatic privilege. While this arrangement is common in countries with a Catholic heritage, it is also recognized in some countries that are not predominantly Catholic.

Beyond diplomatic duties, an apostolic nuncio acts as the official liaison between the Holy See and the local Catholic Church. Among other responsibilities, the nuncio plays a significant role in the process of selecting bishops within the country.

== List of diplomatic posts of the Holy See ==
Diplomatic relations, resident mission, nuncio is of ambassadorial rank and with additional privileges Diplomatic relations, non-resident accreditation with additional privileges Diplomatic relations, resident mission, nuncio has regular ambassadorial status Diplomatic relations, non-resident accreditation, regular ambassadorial status Formal contact with the government, but no diplomatic relations Representative to the Catholic communities only, no diplomatic relations

The Pope accredits diplomatic representatives to a number of sovereign states and other subjects of international law. The following list reflects those accredited entities as of January 2010:

=== Africa ===
Algeria, Angola, Benin, Burkina Faso, Burundi, Botswana, Cameroon, Cape Verde, Central African Republic, Chad, Congo (Republic of), Congo (Democratic Republic of), Côte d'Ivoire, Djibouti, Egypt, Equatorial Guinea, Eritrea, Eswatini, Ethiopia, Gabon, Gambia, Ghana, Guinea, Guinea-Bissau, Kenya, Lesotho, Liberia, Libya, Madagascar, Malawi, Mali, Mauritania, Mauritius, Morocco, Mozambique, Namibia, Niger, Nigeria, Rwanda, São Tomé and Príncipe, Senegal, Seychelles, Sierra Leone, South Africa, Sudan, Tanzania, Togo, Tunisia, Uganda, Zambia, Zimbabwe.

=== The Americas ===
Antigua and Barbuda, Argentina, Bahamas, Barbados, Belize, Bolivia, Brazil, Canada, Chile, Colombia, Costa Rica, Cuba, Dominica, Dominican Republic, Ecuador, El Salvador, Grenada, Guatemala, Guyana, Haiti, Honduras, Jamaica, México, Nicaragua, Panama, Paraguay, Peru, Saint Kitts and Nevis, Saint Lucia, Saint Vincent and Grenadines, Suriname, Trinidad and Tobago, United States of America, Uruguay, Venezuela.

=== Asia ===
Bahrain, Bangladesh, Cambodia, Republic of China (Taiwan), East Timor, India, Indonesia, Iran, Iraq, Israel, Japan, Jordan, Kazakhstan, Kuwait, Kyrgyzstan, Lebanon, Malaysia, Mongolia, Nepal, Pakistan, Palestine, Philippines, Qatar, Singapore, Sri Lanka, South Korea, Syria, Tajikistan, Thailand, Turkmenistan, United Arab Emirates, Uzbekistan, Yemen.

=== Europe ===
Albania, Andorra, Armenia, Austria, Azerbaijan, Belarus, Belgium, Bosnia and Herzegovina, Bulgaria, Croatia, Cyprus, Czech Republic, Estonia, European Union, France, Georgia, Germany, Great Britain, Greece, Hungary, Ireland, Italy, Latvia, Liechtenstein, Lithuania, Luxembourg, Malta, Moldova, Monaco, Montenegro, The Netherlands, Nordic Countries, North Macedonia, Poland, Portugal, Romania, Russia, San Marino, Serbia, Slovakia, Slovenia, Spain, Switzerland, Turkey, Ukraine.

=== Oceania ===
Australia, Cook Islands, Fiji, Kiribati, Marshall Islands, Micronesia (Federated States of), Nauru, New Zealand, Palau, Papua New Guinea, Samoa, Solomon Islands, Tonga, Vanuatu.

=== Special cases ===
- United Nations: the Holy See is represented by the Permanent Observer of the Holy See to the United Nations at the UN headquarters in New York and by the Permanent Observer at the UN's European office in Geneva, both of whom are titular archbishops.
- Pacific Ocean: Countries of the Pacific Ocean are currently represented overall by the nuncio to New Zealand, who serves as the apostolic delegate in the Pacific Ocean.
- Of entities that have established diplomatic relations with the Holy See, there is no representative accredited to the Order of Malta (which is also headquartered in Rome).
- The Holy See does not have relations with fifteen countries:

- Six are Muslim: Afghanistan, Saudi Arabia, Brunei, Comoros, Maldives, and Somalia.
- Four have communist governments: North Korea, Laos, China, and Vietnam.
- The remaining three are Bhutan, Myanmar, and Tuvalu.

== Delegations ==
An apostolic delegate may be sent to liaison between the Catholic Church and a country with which the Holy See has no diplomatic ties, though not accredited to the government of the country. Apostolic delegates have no formal diplomatic status, though in some countries they have some diplomatic privileges.

- Africa:

Comoros, Somalia

- Asia:

The Arabian Peninsula, Brunei, Laos, Myanmar, Vietnam

- the Americas:

the Antilles (Anguilla, Antigua and Barbuda, Aruba, Bahamas, Barbados, Belize, Bermuda, British Virgin Islands, Cayman Islands, Dominica, French Guiana, Grenada, Guadeloupe, Guyana, Jamaica, Martinique, Montserrat, Netherlands Antilles, Saint Kitts and Nevis, Saint Lucia, Suriname, Trinidad and Tobago, Turks and Caicos Islands, Saint Vincent and Grenadines)

- the Pacific Ocean

== See also ==
- Diplomacy of the Holy See
- Foreign relations of the Holy See
- Holy See and the United Nations
- Legal status of the Holy See
- List of diplomatic missions to the Holy See
