= Catholic Church in Trinidad and Tobago =

The Catholic Church in Trinidad and Tobago is part of the worldwide Catholic Church, under the spiritual leadership of the Pope in Rome. The Apostolic Nuncio to Trinidad and Tobago is, since November 2017, Archbishop Fortunatus Nwachukwu, who is also Apostolic Nuncio to other independent states and Apostolic Delegate to the Antilles.

== History ==
The Catholic Church has been present on the island of Trinidad since the 15th century, when the first missionaries arrived here from the Dominican and the Franciscan Religious orders. Missionary ventures to the country launched in the 16th century resulted in the death of a number of missionaries. In 1516, Trinidad was named a territorial abbey, which was the first Catholic structure in Trinidad and Tobago. This Territorial abbey ceased to exist in 1650. The first Catholic church in Trinidad was built in 1591. Capuchins worked there from 1618 to 1803. In 1672, Trinidad and adjacent islands were included in the Diocese of Puerto Rico and in 1790 in the Diocese of Santo Tomás de Guayana, now Archdiocese of Ciudad Bolivar.

In 1797, Trinidad came under British control and missionary work continued because freedom of worship was granted to Catholics. In 1818, the Apostolic Vicariate of Trinidad was established, and on 30 April 1850 it was elevated to the Archdiocese of Port of Spain in 1850. In 1863 the first Irish Dominicans arrived in the diocese and many Irish priests, brothers, and nuns, served the Diocese, as the Irish Dominican Order were given responsibility for the dioceses. Constant missionary activity of the Catholic Church only began in 1864 in Trinidad. Only in 1864 did the archbishops begin a serious program of evangelization of the island of Tobago, where other Christian denominations had prospered in the meantime, including Anglicans and Methodists. In the history of the local Tobago Catholic community, Catherine Creigh goes down in history as the first Catholic, baptized on March 5, 1870.

== Demography and structure ==
Trinidad and Tobago is made up of two main islands and 21 smaller islands, has an area of 5128 km^{2} and a census population of 1,223,916 inhabitants (2011). There are just under 264,365 Catholics in the country, representing 21.6% percent of the total population, according to 2011 census. This is the largest Catholic community in the English-speaking Caribbean. The entire nation is administered as the Archdiocese of Port of Spain, which is divided into five episcopal vicariates. The country has 61 parishes. In Port-of-Spain there is the Cathedral of the Immaculate Conception of the Blessed Virgin Mary, which is a small basilica. The archbishop of Port of Spain is a member of the Antilles Episcopal Conference.

Estimates in 2020 suggested that there were 289,000 Catholics on the islands, or 21.17% of the population; there were 90 priests and 106 nuns serving at that time.

== Nuncio ==
On July 23, 1978 Pope Paul VI issued a breve "Commune omnium bonum", which established in Trinidad and Tobago an Apostolic Nunciature. Currently in Port-of-Spain is the residence of the Nuncio, whose jurisdiction extends to the countries of the Antilles.

- Paul Fouad Tabet (9.02.1980 - 11.02.1984), appointed apostolic pro-nuncio in Belize.
- Manuel Monteiro de Castro (16.02.1985 - 21.08.1990), appointed Apostolic Nuncio in Honduras and El Salvador.
- Eugenio Sbarbaro (7.02.1991 - 26.04.2000), appointed Apostolic Nuncio in Serbia and Montenegro.
- Emil Paul Tscherrig (08.07.2000 - 22.05.2004), appointed Apostolic Nuncio in Korea.
- Thomas Edward Gullickson (2.10.2004 - 21.05.2011), appointed Apostolic Nuncio in Ukraine.
- Nicola Girasoli (21.12.2011–2018).
- Fortunatus Nwachukwu, appointed Apostolic Nuncio (19.3.2018–2022).
- Santiago de Wit Guzmán (30 July 2022 – present)

== Church and state relations ==
Relations between church and state are cordial; both want more native clergy, and have a close relationship via the Education Concordat.

== See also ==
- Archdiocese of Port of Spain
- Religion in Trinidad and Tobago
- Apostolic Nunciature to Trinidad and Tobago
