= Apostolic Delegation to the Antilles =

Diplomatic mission of the Holy See to several Caribbean nations

The Apostolic Delegation to the Antilles represents the interests of the Holy See to officials of the Catholic Church, civil society, and government offices in several nations in the region with which the Holy See has not established diplomatic relations. The position of Apostolic Delegate is not a diplomatic one, though the Delegate is a member of the diplomatic service of the Holy See.

On 7 December 1925 Pope Pius XI established a Delegation to the Antilles seated in Havana with responsibility for the greater and lesser Antilles. After thirteen years the Holy See determined that no one individual could be expected to visit the remote locations of the Antilles by boat and divided responsibly for the Greater and Lesser Antilles among several nunciatures and delegations. On 10 August 1938, the Holy See suppressed the Delegation to the Antilles and divided responsibility with the following assignments: Jamaica and British Honduras to the Nunciature to Cuba; Barbados and the islands belonging to Venezuela to the Nunciature to Venezuela; the rest of the Lesser Antilles and the island of Puerto Rico and its associated territories to the jointly led Nunciatures to the Dominican Republic and Haiti; Bermuda to the Delegation to Canada and Newfoundland; and the Bahamas to the Delegation to the United States. (Note: The clear misreading of the 1938 decree that asserts that responsibility for the Antilles was assigned to the Nunciatures to Cuba and Haiti originates in 1957 with De Marchi's Nunziature Apostoliche. Those two nunciatures were never led by the same diplomat. By contrast, the 1938 decree assigned territories to the joint control of the Nunciatures to the Dominican Republic and Haiti, which were led by the same appointees at the time and for another fifteen years: Giuseppe Fietta (1930–36), Maurilio Silvani (1936–42); Alfredo Pacini (1946–49); Francesco Lardone (1949–53).)

On 19 March 1975, Pope Paul VI established the Delegation to the Antilles once more, this time seated in Port-au-Prince, Haiti. Its area of competence has grown ever smaller with the establishment of nunciatures in countries in the Antilles, including Antigua and Barbuda, Barbados, Belize, Dominica, Grenada, Guyana, Jamaica, Saint Kitts and Nevis, Saint Lucia, Saint Vincent and the Grenadines, Suriname, and Trinidad and Tobago.

The title Apostolic Delegate to the Antilles is held by the prelate appointed Apostolic Nuncio to Trinidad and Tobago; he resides in Trinidad and Tobago.

== Papal representatives to Antilles ==
- George J. Caruana (22 December 1925 – 10 August 1938)
- Luigi Conti (1 August 1975 – 9 February 1980)
- Paul Fouad Tabet (9 February 1980 – 11 February 1984)
- Manuel Monteiro de Castro (16 February 1985 – 21 August 1990)
- Eugenio Sbarbaro (7 February 1991 – 26 April 2000)
- Emil Paul Tscherrig (8 July 2000 – 22 May 2004)
- Thomas Edward Gullickson (2 October 2004 – 21 May 2011)
- Nicola Girasoli (29 October 2011 – 16 June 2017)
- Fortunatus Nwachukwu (4 November 2017 – 17 December 2021)
- Santiago de Wit Guzmán (30 July 2022 – 25 May 2026)
