= Edgar Peña Parra =

Venezuelan Catholic prelate (born 1960)

The Most Reverend Edgar Peña Parra
- Apostolic Nuncio to Italy and San Marino
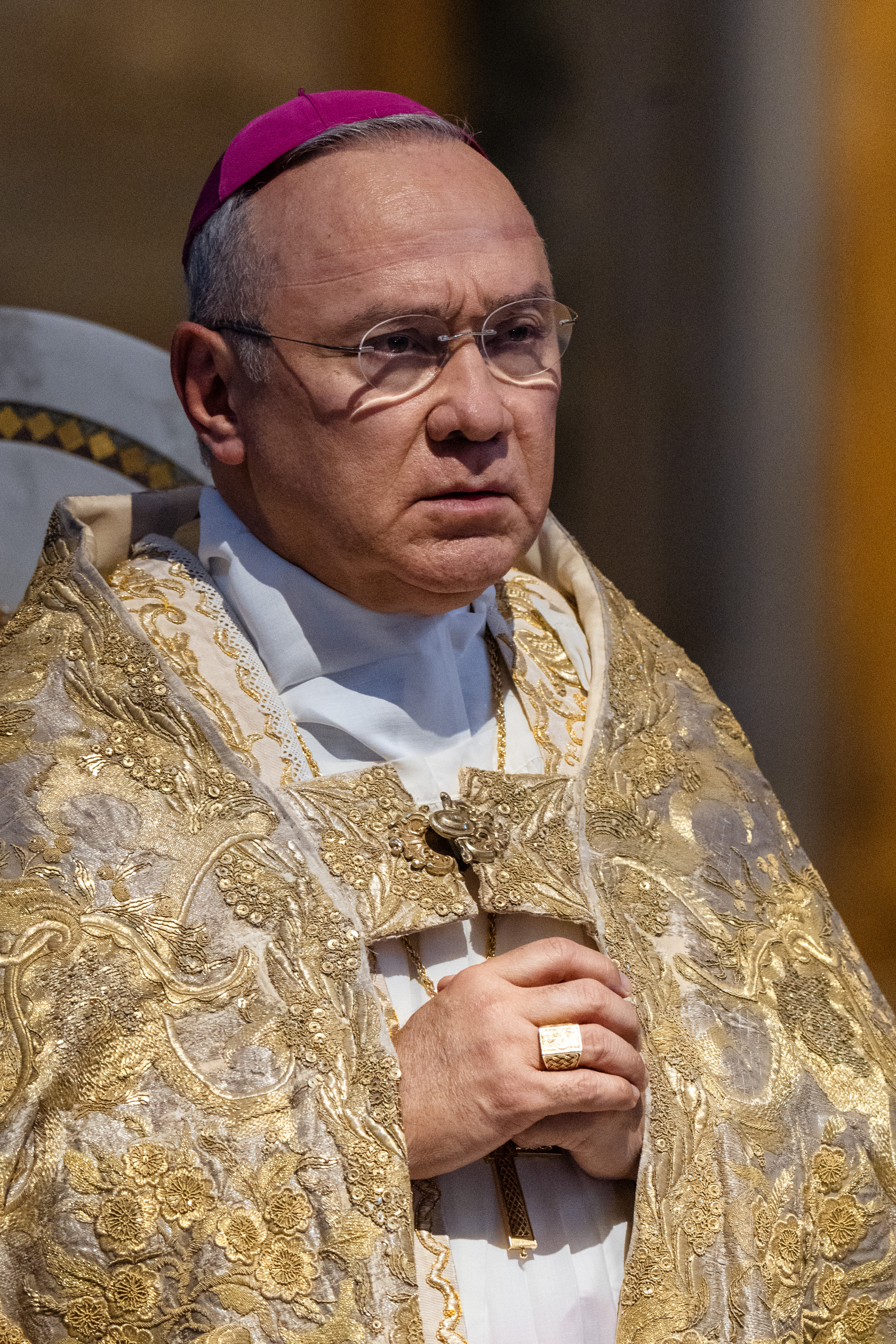
- Peña Parra in 2025
- Church: Catholic
- Appointed: 30 March 2026
- Predecessor: Petar Rajič
- Other post: Titular Archbishop of Thélepte (2011–)
- Previous posts: Substitute of the Secretariat of State (2018–2026); Apostolic Nuncio to Mozambique (2015–18); Apostolic Nuncio to Pakistan (2011–15)

Orders
- Ordination: 23 August 1985 by Domingo Roa Pérez
- Consecration: 5 February 2011 by Pope Benedict XVI

Personal details
- Born: Edgar Peña Parra; 6 March 1960 (age 66) Maracaibo, Venezuela
- Education: Pontifical Gregorian University, Pontifical Ecclesiastical Academy
- Motto: Fiat voluntas tua (Thy will be done)
- Coat of arms

Edgar Robinson Peña Parra (born 6 March 1960) is a Venezuelan Catholic prelate who is the Apostolic Nuncio to Italy and San Marino. He served as Substitute for the Secretariat of State for the Holy See from 2018 to 2026. (Note: The only other Venezuelan to hold a senior curial position was Cardinal Rosalio José Castillo Lara, who held several senior positions between 1975 and 1997.) He joined the diplomatic corps of the Holy See in 1993, serving as Apostolic Nuncio to Pakistan from 2011 to 2015 and to Mozambique from 2015 to 2018. He is the first Venezuelan to serve as an apostolic nuncio.

== Early years ==
Peña Parra was born in Maracaibo, Venezuela, on 6 March 1960 and raised in the El Saladillo neighborhood. He earned a degree in philosophy in 1981 at the seminary of the Diocese of San Cristóbal and then a bachelor's degree in theology at the seminary in Caracas. He was ordained a priest of the Archdiocese of Maracaibo on 23 August 1985 by Archbishop Domingo Roa Pérez.

In Rome, beginning in 1986, he studied diplomacy at the Pontifical Ecclesiastical Academy and in 1993 he earned a degree in canon law at the Pontifical Gregorian University with the thesis: "Los Derechos Humanos en el Sistema Interamericano a la luz del Magisterio Pontifical", which, Crux reports, "has become a reference point for the study of human rights".

== Diplomatic career ==
Peña Parra joined the diplomatic service of the Holy See on 1 April 1993. He fulfilled assignments in Kenya, Yugoslavia (1997–99), South Africa, Honduras (2002–05), and Mexico (2006–11), with a brief stint in the office of the Holy See's representative to the United Nations in Geneva. In Kenya, he represented the Holy See on housing and environmental issues with agencies of the United Nations. In his last assignment before being promoted to nuncio, Peña Parra worked in the Apostolic Nunciature to Mexico first under Giuseppe Bertello and then Christophe Pierre.

On 8 January 2011, Pope Benedict XVI appointed Peña Parra titular archbishop of Thélepte and gave him the title "Apostolic Nuncio". (Note: The announcement of the title without a change of assignment, suggesting at first that he was remaining in Mexico even though the current nuncio to Mexico had not yet been reassigned, apparently resulted from some confusion in the Holy See Press Office. Appointments were awaiting approval from foreign governments even as Peña's episcopal consecration was already scheduled.) On 2 February 2011 Pope Benedict XVI appointed him Apostolic Nuncio to Pakistan. He received his episcopal consecration on 5 February 2011 from Pope Benedict XVI, with Cardinals Angelo Sodano and Tarcisio Bertone as co-consecrators.

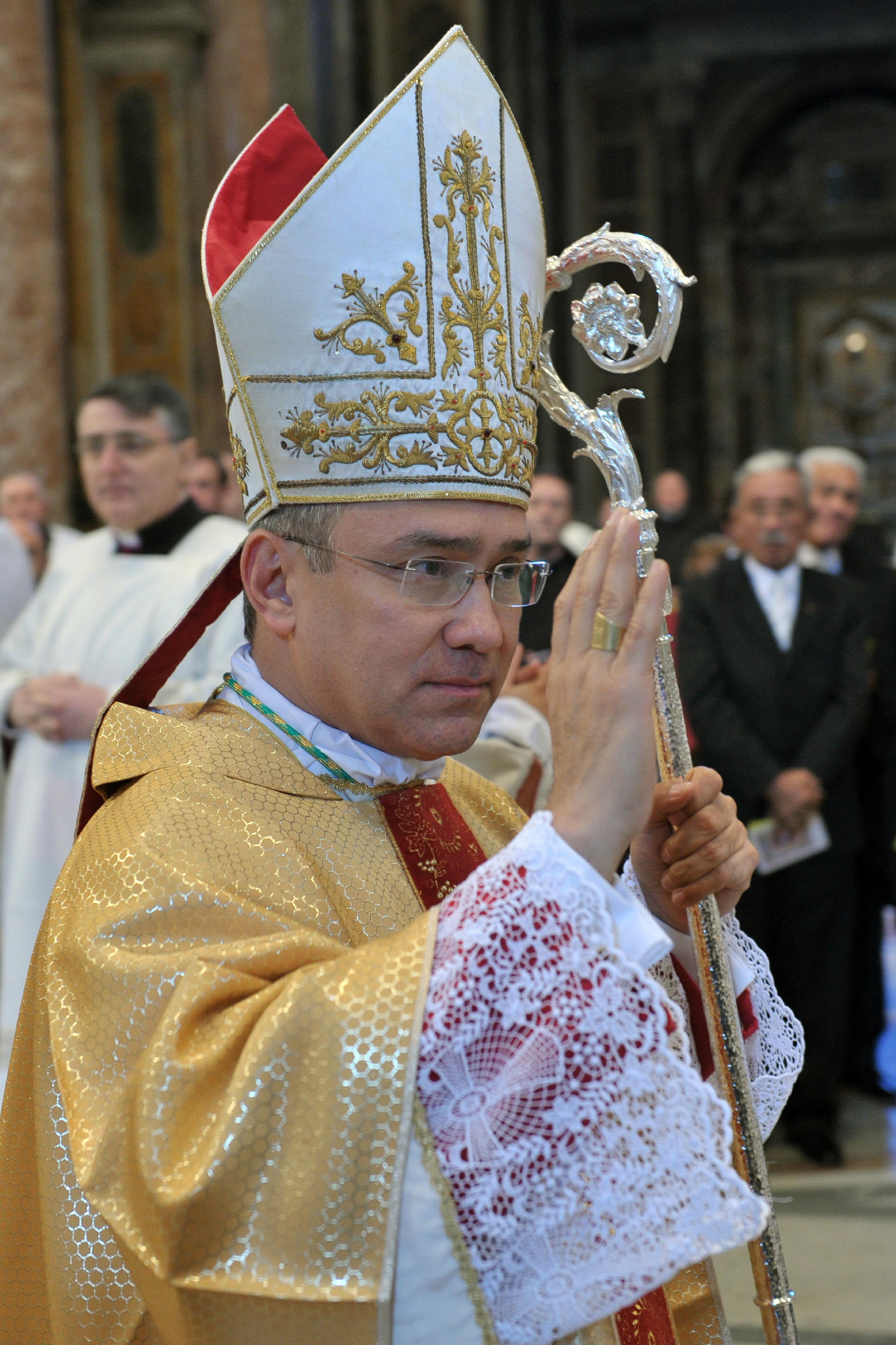
Peña Parra in 2011, giving his first episcopal blessing after his episcopal consecration by Pope Benedict XVI.

On 21 February 2015, Pope Francis appointed Peña Parra as Apostolic Nuncio to Mozambique. In 2016 he joined the group of mediators trying to restore peace between the government of Mozambique and the opposition political party Renamo.

== Substitute for General Affairs ==
Peña Parra was appointed Substitute for General Affairs of the Secretariat of State on 15 August 2018, effective 15 October. He is the second Latin American to hold that position, following the Argentine Leonardo Sandri, who was substitute from 2000 to 2007.

Peña Parra travelled to Abu Dhabi in 2022 to inaugurate the resident apostolic nunciature in the UAE. The Holy See established diplomatic relations with the UAE in 2007, but was non-residential and based in Kuwait.

In 2023, Peña Parra admitted that he authorized electronic surveillance of the director of the Vatican bank, without legal authorization. He ordered the surveillance because he wanted information about the “anomalous attitude” of directors who had refused an application from the Secretariat of State for a loan.

Testifying before the High Court of England and Wales on 4 July 2024, Peña Parra stated that he willingly signed off on fraudulent invoices he knew were "completely fictitious" involving Vatican investment properties in London.

In September 2024, Archbishop Peña Parra issued an order trying to reinstate a former priest, Ariel Alberto Príncipi, convicted of child sexual abuse by two interdiocesan tribunals in Argentina. Archbishop John Joseph Kennedy, Secretary for Discipline at the Dicastery for the Doctrine of the Faith, nullified the attempt and declared the case closed.

== Return as diplomat ==
On 30 March 2026, he was appointed Apostolic Nuncio to Italy and San Marino. Paolo Rudelli was appointed to succeed him.

== Personal life ==
He is fluent in Spanish, Italian, English, French, Portuguese, and Serbo-Croatian.

== Writings ==
- Peña Parra, Edgar Robinson (1993). Los Derechos Humanos en el Sistema Interamericano a la luz del Magisterio Pontificio.

== See also ==
- List of heads of the diplomatic missions of the Holy See
- Holy See – Pakistan relations

== Notes ==
Catholic Church titles
Preceded by Velasio De Paolis	— TITULAR — Titular Bishop of Thélepte; 2011–present	Incumbent
Diplomatic posts
Preceded by Adolfo Tito Yllana	Apostolic Nuncio to Pakistan; 2011-2015	Succeeded by Ghaleb Moussa Abdalla Bader
Preceded by Antonio Arcari	Apostolic Nuncio to Mozambique; 2015-2018	Succeeded by Piergiorgio Bertoldi
Catholic Church titles
Preceded by Giovanni Angelo Becciu	Substitute for General Affairs of the Secretariat of State; 2018–2026	Succeeded by Paolo Rudelli
Diplomatic posts
Preceded by Petar Rajič	Apostolic Nuncio to Italy and San Marino; 2026-present	Incumbent
