= St. Joseph Church (Trinidad and Tobago) =

Coordinates: 10.65385°N 61.41374°W

St. Joseph R.C. Church
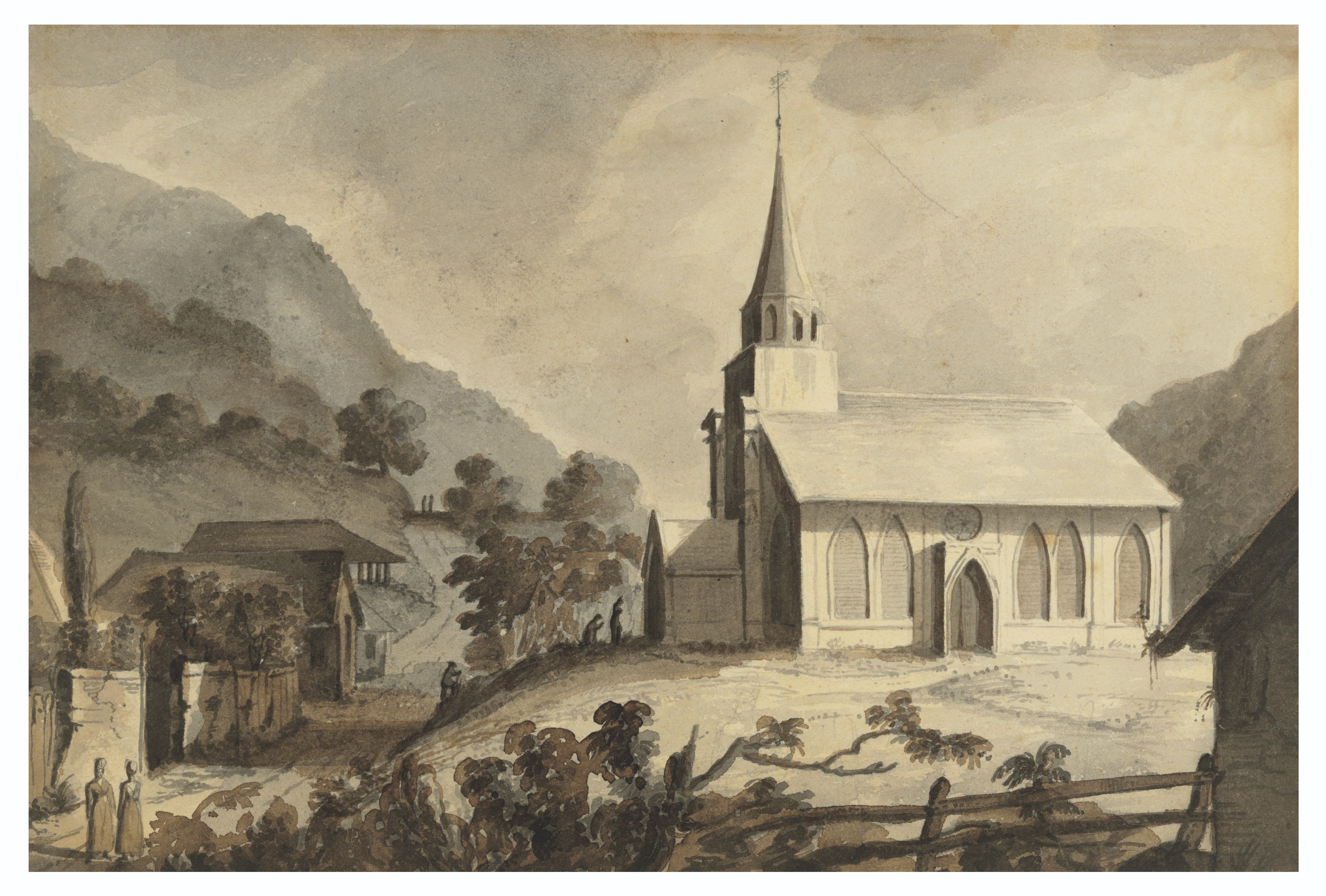
- St. Joseph Church, 1st half of 19th century
- St. Joseph R.C. Church
- Location: Saint Joseph
- Country: Trinidad and Tobago
- Denomination: Roman Catholic Church

The St. Joseph R.C. Church is a religious building that is affiliated with the Catholic Church and is located on the street Abercromby (La Rue Decide) of the town of St. Joseph (founded by the Spanish as San Jose de Oruña), part of the Tunapuna–Piarco region in the north of the island of Trinidad in the Caribbean and island country of Trinidad and Tobago.

The temple follows the Roman or Latin rite and depends on the Metropolitan Archdiocese of Port of Spain. The original church dated from the 16th century when Domingo de Vera y Orun took possession of the island of Trinidad on behalf of the King of Spain, but this first temple was looted and destroyed by attacks of English and Dutch, was rebuilt in 1690, but in 1810 the building collapse, being rebuilt between 1815 and 1817. The temple guarded the remains of three Capuchin friars who were massacred by Indians working in the Mission of Saint Raphael. In 1989 excavations were conducted in the burial place of religious who were transferred to the Church of St. Raphael.

== See also ==
- Catholic Church in Trinidad and Tobago
