= Thomas Gullickson =

American Catholic archbishop

His Excellency, The Most Reverend Thomas Gullickson
- Apostolic Nuncio emeritus of Switzerland and Liechtenstein; Titular Archbishop of Polymartium
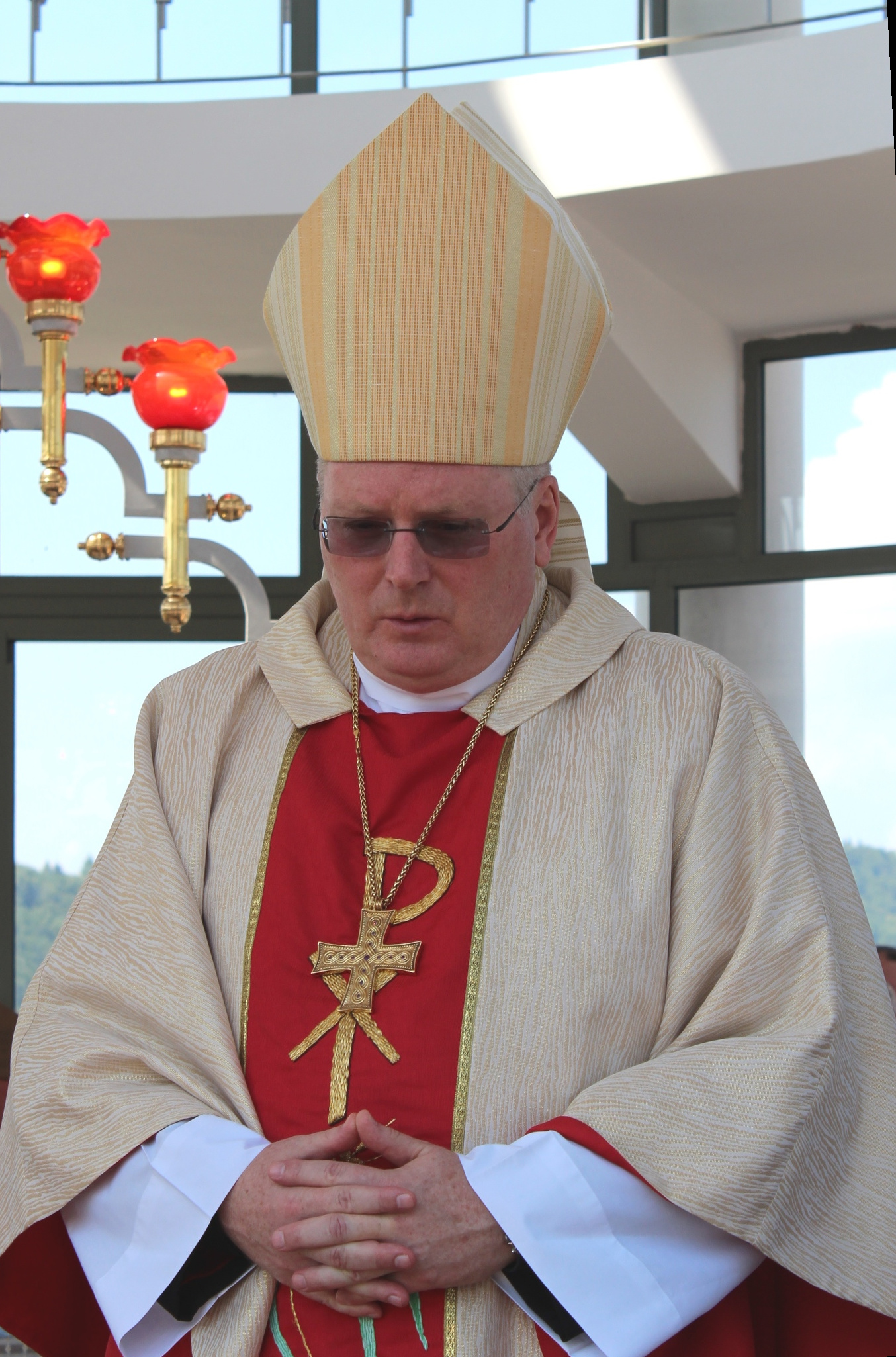
- Appointed: September 5, 2015
- Retired: December 31, 2020
- Predecessor: Diego Causero
- Successor: Martin Krebs
- Other post: Titular Archbishop of Polymartium
- Previous posts: Apostolic Nuncio to Ukraine (2011–2015); Apostolic Nuncio to the Bahamas, Dominica, Saint Kitts and Nevis, Saint Lucia, Saint Vincent and the Grenadines, Tinidad and Tobago, Antigua and Barbuda, Barbados, Jamaica, Guyana, Suriname, Grenada and Apostolic Delegate to the Antilles (2004-2011)

Orders
- Ordination: July 27, 1976 by Lambert Anthony Hoch
- Consecration: November 11, 2004 by Giovanni Lajolo, Robert James Carlson and Paul Vincent Dudley

Personal details
- Born: Thomas Edward Gullickson; August 14, 1950 (age 76) Sioux Falls, South Dakota, US
- Education: Pontifical Gregorian University
- Motto: Properantes adventum diei Dei (Hastening the coming of the day of God)

Styles of Thomas Gullickson
- Reference style: His Excellency; The Most Reverend
- Spoken style: Your Excellency
- Religious style: Archbishop

Thomas Edward Gullickson (born August 14, 1950) is an American prelate of the Roman Catholic Church. He has served as an apostolic nuncio in the Holy See diplomatic corps since 2004. Gullickson was posted to Switzerland and Liechtenstein from 2015 until his retirement at the end of 2020.

== Early years ==
Born in Sioux Falls, South Dakota, United States, Thomas Gullickson was ordained to the priesthood for the Diocese of Sioux Falls by Bishop Lambert Hoch on July 27, 1976. He studied canon law at the Pontifical Gregorian University in Rome, writing his doctoral dissertation in 1985 on The Diocesan Bishop: Moderator and Sponsor of the Ministry of the Word. A Comparative Study of Tridentine Legislation and the 1983 Code of Canon Law.

== Diplomatic career ==
To prepare for a diplomatic career, Gullickson entered the Pontifical Ecclesiastical Academy in Rome in 1981. He joined the Holy See diplomatic service on May 1, 1985, and served in diplomatic missions to Rwanda, Austria, Czechoslovakia, Jerusalem, Israel and Germany.

On October 2, 2004, Pope John Paul II appointed Gullickson as titular archbishop of Polymartium and apostolic nuncio to Trinidad and Tobago, the Bahamas, Dominica, Saint Kitts and Nevis, Saint Lucia, and Saint Vincent and the Grenadines – all island nations in the Caribbean Sea. Gullickson received his episcopal consecration on November 11, 2004, from Cardinal Giovanni Lajolo, with Bishops Robert Carlson and Paul Dudley as co-consecrators.

On December 15, 2004, Gullickson was given additional appointments as apostolic nuncio to other Caribbean nations: Antigua and Barbuda, Barbados, Jamaica, Guyana, and Suriname. On December 20, 2004, he was named as apostolic nuncio to Grenada. Gullickson was named apostolic nuncio to Ukraine on May 21, 2011. While there, Gullickson posted on Twitter and on his blog his criticism of Pope Francis regarding family planning, the eucharist, the pope's criticism of the Roman Curia, and the Vatican's relations with Russia.

Pope Francis appointed Gullickson Apostolic Nuncio to Switzerland and Liechtenstein on September 5, 2015. Gullickson announced in October 2020 his retirement as apostolic nuncio and said that he planned to retire in Sioux Falls. Pope Francis accepted his resignation on December 31, 2020.

== Views on liturgy ==
Gullickson has frequently expressed his preference for the extraordinary form of the mass in which the priest faces the altar in the same direction as the congregation. He considers it a step to renew what he sees as a proper reverence for the liturgy.

== See also ==
- List of Catholic bishops of the United States § American bishops serving outside the United States
- List of diplomatic missions of the Holy See
- List of heads of the diplomatic missions of the Holy See

Catholic Church titles
Preceded by Ciriaco Scanzillo	Titular Archbishop of Polymartium; 2004–present	Succeeded by Incumbent
Diplomatic posts
Preceded by Emil Paul Tscherrig	Nuncio to Trinidad and Tobago, Bahamas, Dominica, Saint Kitts and Nevis, Saint Vincent and Grenadines, Antigua and Barbuda, Barbados, Jamaica, Guyana, Suriname, Grenada; 2004–2011	Succeeded by Nicola Girasoli
Preceded by Ivan Jurkovič	Nuncio to Ukraine; 2011–2015	Succeeded by Claudio Gugerotti
Preceded by Diego Causero	Nuncio to Switzerland and Liechtenstein; 2015–2020	Succeeded by Martin Krebs
