= Alfredo Pacini =

Italian Cardinal

His Eminence Alfredo Pacini
- Cardinal-Priest pro hac vice of Santi Angeli Custodi a Città Giardino
- Church: Roman Catholic Church
- Appointed: 29 June 1967
- Term ended: 23 December 1967
- Successor: Sebastiano Baggio
- Previous posts: Apostolic Nuncio to Haiti (1946-49); Apostolic Nuncio to the Dominican Republic (1946-49); Titular Archbishop of Germia (1946-67); Apostolic Nuncio to Uruguay (1949-60); Apostolic Nuncio to Switzerland (1960-67)

Orders
- Ordination: 25 July 1913 by Arturo Marchi
- Consecration: 11 June 1946 by Angelo Giuseppe Roncalli
- Created cardinal: 26 June 1967 by Pope Paul VI
- Rank: Cardinal-Priest

Personal details
- Born: Alfredo Pacini; 10 February 1888 Capannori, Kingdom of Italy
- Baptised: 10 February 1888
- Died: 23 December 1967 (aged 79) Rome, Italy
- Buried: Santi Quirico e Giulitta
- Motto: Humilitas et pax ("Humility and peace")

Styles of Alfredo Pacini
- Reference style: His Eminence
- Spoken style: Your Eminence
- Informal style: Cardinal

Alfredo Pacini (10 February 1888 – 23 December 1967) was an Italian Cardinal of the Roman Catholic Church. He served as Nuncio to Switzerland from 1960 to 1967, and made a cardinal in 1967.

== Biography ==
Alfredo Pacini was born in Capannori and studied at the seminary in Lucca before being ordained to the priesthood on 25 July 1913. He then did pastoral work in the Archdiocese of Lucca and taught at its seminary until 1915, when he became a military chaplain during World War I. After resuming his work in Lucca, Pacini was raised to the rank of Honorary Chamberlain of His Holiness on 8 October 1924. He served as secretary (1924-1928) and auditor (1928-1933) of the nunciature to Yugoslavia. From 1935 to 1944, he was auditor of the Polish nunciature. He became Domestic Prelate of His Holiness on 3 September 1935 and counselor of the nunciature to France in 1944.

On 23 April 1946, Pacini was appointed Nuncio to Haiti and Santo Domingo and Titular Archbishop of Germia by Pope Pius XII. He received his episcopal consecration on the following 11 June from Archbishop Angelo Roncalli, with Archbishop Louis Le Hunsec, CSSP, and Bishop Stanislas Courbe serving as co-consecrators, in Paris.

Pacini was named Nuncio to Uruguay on 23 April 1949, and Nuncio to Switzerland on 4 February 1960. From 1962 to 1965, he attended the Second Vatican Council.

Pope Paul VI made him Cardinal-Priest of Santi Angeli Custodi a Città Giardino in the consistory of 26 June 1967. Pacini died in Rome at age 79 and was buried in his family's tomb in Capannori.

| Preceded by Gustavo Testa | Nuncio to Switzerland; 1960–1967 | Succeeded by Ambrogio Marchioni |
