= Eugenio Sbarbaro =

Italian prelate of the Catholic Church (born 1934)

His Excellency, The Most Reverend Eugenio Sbarbaro
- Apostolic Nuncio emeritus of Serbia; Titular Archbishop of Tiddi
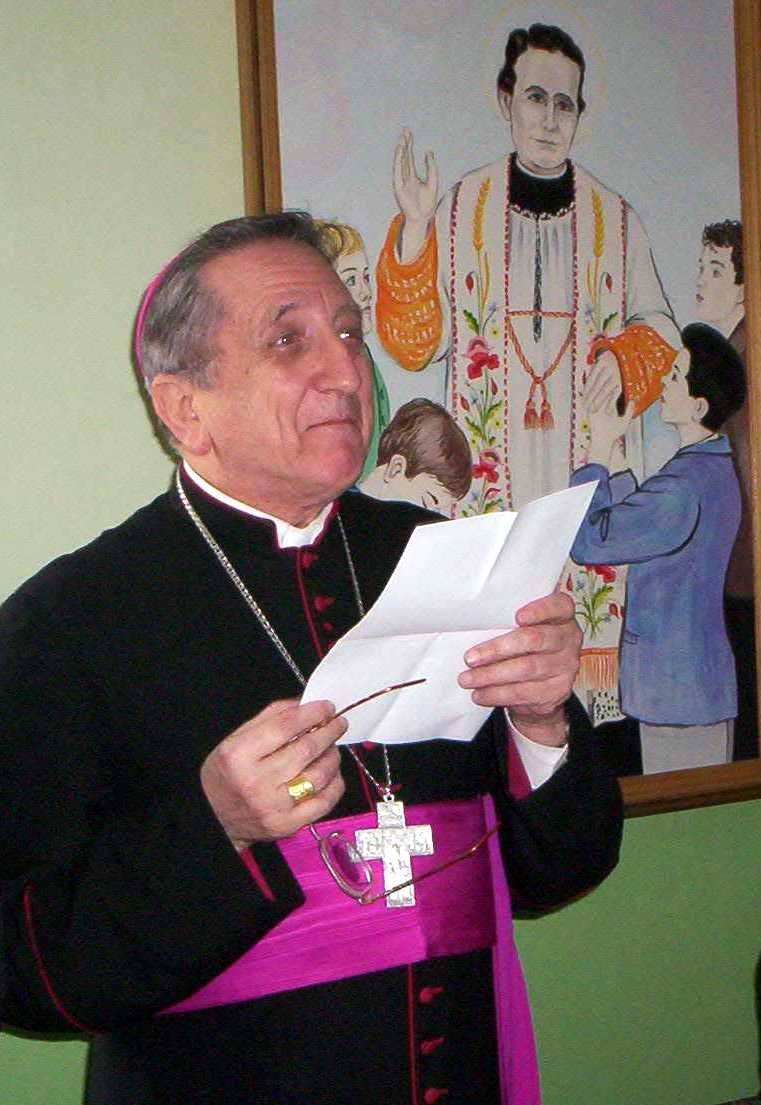
- Aposlolic nuncio Eugenio Sbarbaro in Mužlja on 31 January 2009
- Appointed: 26 April 2000
- Retired: 8 August 2009
- Predecessor: Santos Abril y Castelló
- Successor: Orlando Antonini
- Other post: Titular Archbishop of Tiddi
- Previous posts: Apostolic Nuncio to Suriname, Guyana and Saint Kitts and Nevis (1994–2000); Apostolic Pro-Nuncio to Belize, Antigua and Barbuda, Bahamas, Barbados, Dominica, Jamaica, Grenada, Saint Lucia, Saint Vincent and the Grenadines, Trinidad and Tobago and Apostolic Delegate to the Antilles (1991–2000); Apostolic Pro-Nuncio to Malawi and Zambia (1985–1991)

Orders
- Ordination: 11 June 1960 by Angelo Zambarbieri
- Consecration: 19 October 1985 by Agostino Casaroli, Pio Laghi, and James Aloysius Hickey

Personal details
- Born: June 26, 1934 (age 91) Borzonasca, Genoa, Italy

Styles of Eugenio Sbarbaro
- Reference style: His Excellency; The Most Reverend
- Spoken style: Your Excellency
- Religious style: Archbishop

Eugenio Sbarbaro (born 3 July 1934) is an Italian prelate of the Catholic Church who spent his career in the diplomatic service of the Holy See.

== Biography ==
Eugenio Sbarbaro was born on 3 July 1934 in Borzonasca, Province of Genoa. He was ordained a priest on 11 June 1960.

== Diplomatic career ==
He joined the diplomatic service in 1968, and his first assignments took him to Paraguay, Uganda, Turkey, and the United States.

On 14 September 1985, Pope John Paul II appointed him Titular Archbishop of Tiddi and Apostolic Pro-Nuncio to Malawi and to Zambia. He received his episcopal consecration on 19 October from Cardinal Agostino Casaroli.

On 7 February 1991, John Paul appointed him Apostolic Pro-Nuncio to Antigua and Barbuda, the Bahamas, Barbados, Belize, Dominica, Jamaica, Grenada, Saint Vincent and the Grenadines, Saint Lucia, and Trinidad and Tobago, as well as Apostolic Delegate for the Antilles. In addition, he appointed him Nuncio to Suriname on 13 July 1994, to Guyana on 26 August 1997, and to Saint Kitts and Nevis on 23 October 1999.

On 26 April 2000, John Paul appointed him Apostolic Nuncio to Yugoslavia.

His title and responsibilities changed with the breakup of Yugoslavia. By February 2007 he was Nuncio to Serbia.

His diplomatic service ended when Benedict replaced him as Nuncio to Serbia on 8 August 2009.

He was later connected by news reports to Rev. Michael Seed's attempts to sell Vatican titles in exchange for contributions, with Sbarbaro providing an introduction to a Balkan arms dealer.

== See also ==
- List of heads of the diplomatic missions of the Holy See
