= Diego Causero =

Italian prelate of the Catholic Church (1940–2025)

His Excellency, The Most Reverend Diego Causero
- Apostolic Nuncio Emeritus to Switzerland and Liechtenstein; Titular Archbishop of Gradum
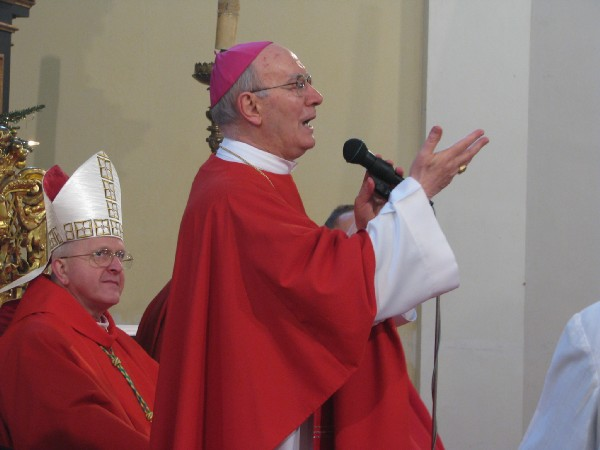
- Archbishop Diego Causero (center)
- Appointed: 28 May 2011
- Retired: 5 September 2015
- Predecessor: Francesco Canalini
- Successor: Thomas Gullickson
- Other post: Titular Archbishop of Gradum (2001–2025)
- Previous posts: Apostolic Nuncio to the Czech Republic (2004–2011); Apostolic Nuncio to Syria (1999–2004); Apostolic Nuncio to the Central African Republic (1993–1999); Apostolic Nuncio to the Republic of Congo (1993–1995); Apostolic Nuncio to Chad (1992–1999)

Orders
- Ordination: 7 April 1963 by Giuseppe Zaffonato
- Consecration: 6 January 1993 by Pope John Paul II, Giovanni Battista Re, and Justin Francis Rigali

Personal details
- Born: 13 January 1940 Moimacco, Udine, Italy
- Died: 14 November 2025 (aged 85) Udine, Italy

Styles of Diego Causero
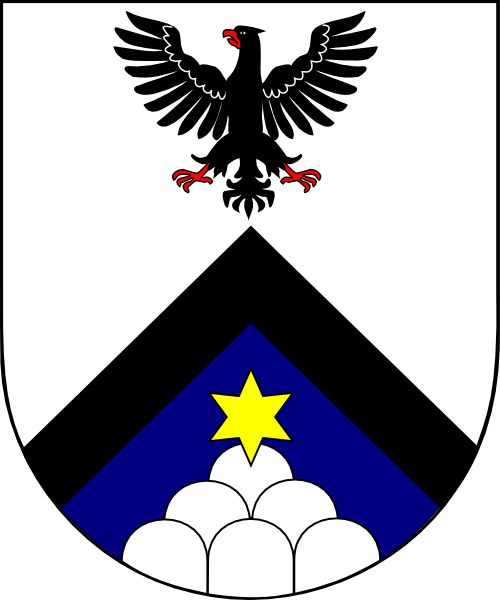
- Reference style: His Excellency; The Most Reverend
- Spoken style: Your Excellency
- Religious style: Archbishop

Diego Causero (13 January 1940 – 14 November 2025) was an Italian prelate of the Catholic Church who spent his career in the diplomatic service of the Holy See. From 1992 to 2015, he served as the head of the Vatican's diplomatic mission in several African and European countries.

== Background ==
Diego Causero was born in Moimacco in the Province of Udine, Italy, on 13 January 1940. He studied at the seminary in Udine, he continued his studies at the Pontifical Gregorian University from 1959 to 1964 and was ordained a priest of the Archdiocese of Udine on 7 April 1963.

He earned a doctorate in theology in 1966, with a speciality in liturgy, at the Pontifical Atheneum of St. Anselm.

== Diplomatic career ==
To prepare for a career as a diplomat he entered the Pontifical Ecclesiastical Academy in 1969. He entered the diplomatic service of the Holy See in 1973. His assignments included stints in Nigeria, Spain, Syria, Australia, as the Holy See's representative to the United Nations in Geneva, and in Albania.

On 15 December 1992, Pope John Paul II named him a titular archbishop and Apostolic Nuncio to Chad. He received his episcopal consecration on 6 January 1993 from Pope John Paul. On 1 February 1993, he was named Apostolic Nuncio to the Central African Republic and the Republic of the Congo as well. (Note: Luigi Pezzuto succeeded him as nuncio in the Democratic Republic of the Congo on 7 December 1996.)

On 31 March 1999, Pope John Paul II appointed him Apostolic Nuncio to Syria.

On 10 January 2004, John Paul II named him Apostolic Nuncio to the Czech Republic.

On 28 May 2011, Pope Benedict XVI appointed him Apostolic Nuncio to Switzerland and Liechtenstein.

He retired on 5 September 2015 upon the appointment of Thomas Gullickson as his successor in Switzerland and Liechtenstein.

== Death ==
Causero died on 14 November 2025, at the age of 85.

== See also ==
- List of heads of the diplomatic missions of the Holy See
