= Apostolic Nunciature to Trinidad and Tobago =

Diplomatic mission of the Holy See in the Caribbean

The Apostolic Nunciature to Trinidad and Tobago is an ecclesiastical office of the Catholic Church in Trinidad and Tobago. It is a diplomatic post of the Holy See, whose representative is called the Apostolic Nuncio with the rank of an ambassador. The Apostolic Nuncio to Trinidad and Tobago is usually also the Apostolic Nuncio to Antigua and Barbuda, Bahamas, Barbados, Belize, Dominica, Grenada, Guyana, Jamaica, Saint Kitts and Nevis, Saint Lucia, Saint Vincent and the Grenadines, Suriname and the Apostolic Delegate to the Antilles upon his appointment to said nations. The nuncio resides in Port of Spain, Trinidad.

== List of papal representatives to Trinidad and Tobago ==
Apostolic Pro-Nuncios

- Paul Fouad Naïm Tabet (9 February 1980 - 8 September 1984)
- Manuel Monteiro de Castro (16 February 1985 - 21 August 1990)

Apostolic Nuncios

- Eugenio Sbarbaro (7 February 1991 - 26 April 2000)
- Emil Paul Tscherrig (8 July 2000 - 22 May 2004)
- Thomas Edward Gullickson (2 October 2004 - 21 May 2011)
- Nicola Girasoli (21 December 2011 - 16 June 2017)
- Fortunatus Nwachukwu (4 November 2017 – 17 December 2021)
- Santiago de Wit Guzmán (30 July 2022 – 25 May 2026)

== See also ==
- Apostolic Delegation to the Antilles
- Catholic Church in Trinidad and Tobago
