= Apostolic Nunciature to Switzerland =

Diplomatic Mission of the Holy See in Switzerland

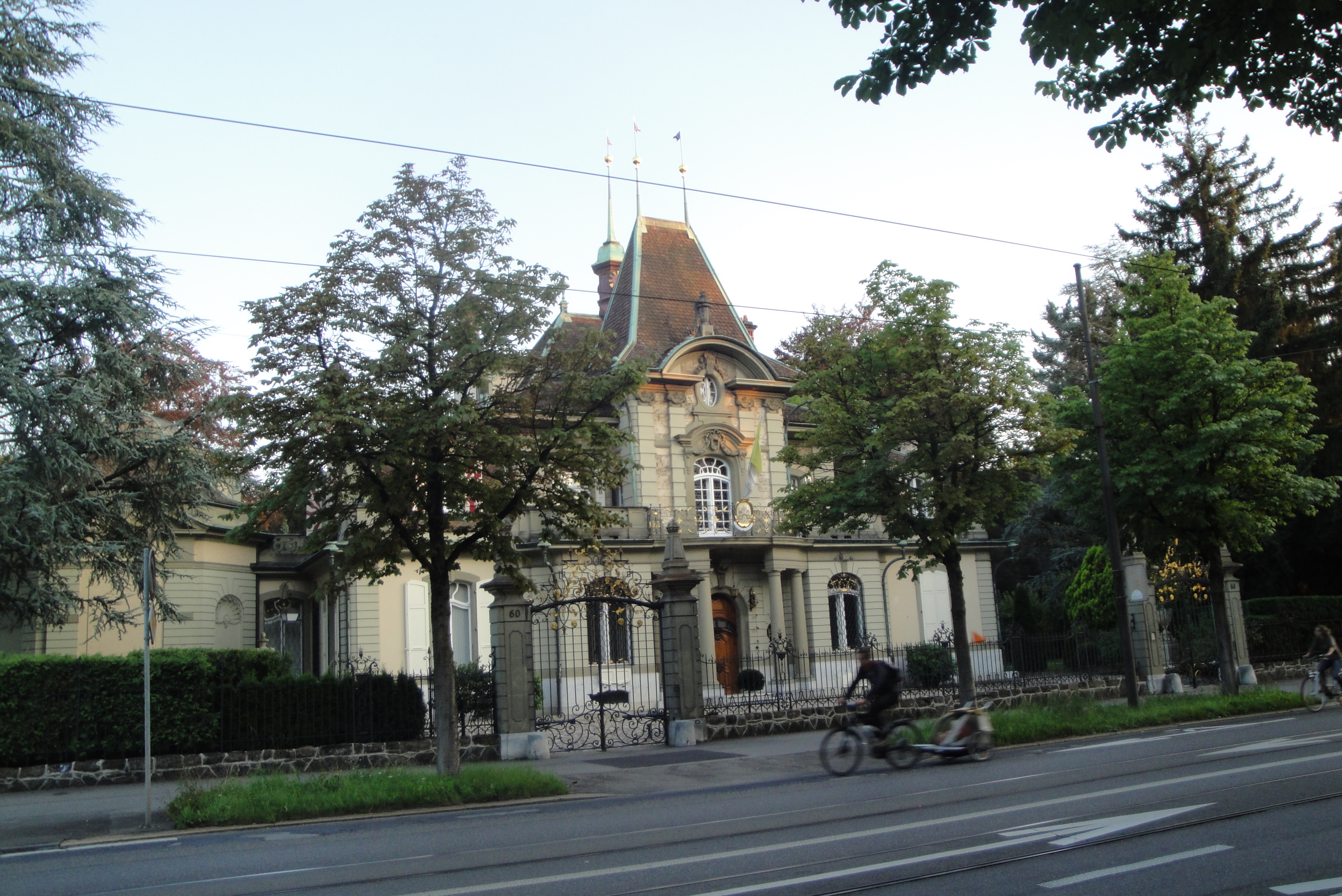
- Location: Bern
- Apostolic Nuncio: Archbishop Martin Krebs

The Apostolic Nunciature to Switzerland is an ecclesiastical office of the Catholic Church in Switzerland. It is a diplomatic post of the Holy See, whose representative is called the Apostolic Nuncio, with the rank of an ambassador. The nunciature is located in the capital of Bern.

The Apostolic Nuncio to Switzerland is usually also the Apostolic Nuncio to Liechtenstein upon his appointment to said nation.

== History ==
Nunciatures, the papal system of diplomatic representation, arose in Europe in the course of the 16th century. The papal envoy, called the nuncio, holds the rank of a bishop and has a dual function. As diplomatic representative of the Holy See, he provides the Roman Curia with information about his host country and receives instructions from Rome. In his ecclesiastical function he mediates between the bishops, the clergy and the Curia, informs the Holy See about the Catholic Church in his host country, and examines the suitability of the candidates when bishops are elected or appointed.

The nuncios sent to the Swiss Confederacy at the beginning of the 16th century were entrusted with political tasks such as military capitulations and the recruitment of mercenaries. After the Council of Trent they were placed in the service of the Counter-Reformation and the Catholic Reformation, and some of them exercised quasi-episcopal functions.

=== Nunciature of Lucerne ===
In 1586, at the request of the Five Cantons (Uri, Schwyz, Unterwalden, Lucerne and Zug), the permanent nunciature was established in Lucerne, the leading Catholic canton (Vorort). With interruptions, it remained there until 1873. After the French embassy in Solothurn, it was the second-oldest permanent legation in Switzerland. A peculiarity of this diplomatic relationship was that the Confederacy had no permanent diplomatic mission to the Holy See. Only from 1991 was Switzerland represented there, on a special mission, by its ambassador in Prague, who was appointed regular ambassador in 2004. Because of differences with the leading Catholic canton, the nunciature resided in Altdorf from 1725 to 1730 and in Schwyz from 1835 to 1843. Its area comprised the Catholic cantons of the Confederacy and their subject territories, the Three Leagues (including the Valtellina, Bormio and Chiavenna), the Valais, and the whole territories of the dioceses of Basel, Chur, Constance, Lausanne and Sion, and therefore also Upper Alsace, territories in southern Germany, and parts of Vorarlberg and Tyrol. After the Peace of Westphalia, relations with the territories outside Switzerland steadily loosened. From 1803 the nuncio was also accredited to the cantons of mixed denomination, and from 1816 to the Reformed cantons as well. Since then the nunciature has covered Switzerland only.

In 1798 the nuncio was expelled by the French and by the government of the Helvetic Republic. The nunciature was re-established in 1803. After 1815 the regulation of the dioceses was one of its main concerns, and from 1830 tensions between the Church and individual liberal cantons, over the dissolution of monasteries, put a heavy strain on relations. In the new federal state, from 1848 the Holy See was represented only by chargés d'affaires, who were isolated from the rest of the diplomatic corps. In 1864 the chargé d'affaires did not comply with the French and Austrian envoys' request that the nunciature move to Bern, because in his view this would have meant recognizing the new federal constitution. Pope Pius IX's condemnation of the Kulturkampf in Switzerland led on 12 December 1873 to the breaking off of the already strained diplomatic relations and to the abolition of the Lucerne nunciature. The chargé d'affaires left Switzerland on 12 February 1874.

=== Nunciature in Bern ===
On the initiative of Federal Councillor Giuseppe Motta, the Federal Council agreed in June 1920, despite opposition from Reformed circles, to resume diplomatic relations with the Holy See. On 8 November 1920 Luigi Maglione, until then the semi-official chargé d'affaires, took up his duties as nuncio in Bern. As provided for by the Congress of Vienna in 1815, the nuncio became doyen of the diplomatic corps in 1923, after the French ambassador had waived the position; the Federal Council granted him this privilege de jure only in 1953. The nuncio's visits to cantonal governments caused controversy in 1924. From then on he confined his work to Catholic church affairs, although from 1970 this work too drew criticism, among other things because of disputed appointments of bishops in the Diocese of Chur.

== List of papal representatives to Switzerland ==
- Antonio Pucci (1517 - 1521)
- Paolo Odescalchi (1553 - 15 June 1560)
- Ottaviano della Raverta (1553 - 1560)
- Giovanni Antonio Volpi (25 March 1560 – July 1579)
- Giovanni Francesco Bonomi (27 May 1579 – 16 September 1581)
- Giovanni Battista Santorio (17 August 1586 – 15 August 1587)
- Ottavio Paravicini (August 1587 – 20 June 1591)
- Owen Lewis (20 June 1591 – 14 October 1595)
- Giovanni della Torre (10 November 1595 – 10 June 1606)
- Fabrizio Verallo (10 June 1606 – 24 June 1608)
- Ladislao d'Aquino (1608 - 15 September 1613)
- Ludovico Sarego (15 September 1613 – 15 April 1621)
- Alessandro Scappi (15 April 1621 – 28 June 1628)
- Ciriaco Rocci (28 June 1628 – 18 May 1630)
- Ranuccio Scotti Douglas (22 May 1630 – 4 May 1639)
- Girolamo Farnese (4 May 1639 – 28 October 1643)
- Lorenzo Gavotti, C.R. (28 October 1643 – 7 November 1646)
- Alfonso Sacrati (7 November 1646 – 14 September 1647)
- Francesco Boccapaduli (14 September 1647 – September 1652)
- Jost Knab (September 1652 – April 1653)
- Carlo Carafa della Spina, C.R. (1 February 1653 – November 1654)
- Federico Borromeo (iuniore) (28 November 1654 – 20 August 1665)
- Federico Baldeschi Colonna (15 July 1665 – March 1668)
- Rodolpho Acquaviva (15 April 1668 – August 1670)
- Odoardo Cibo (11 August 1670 - 1679)
- Giacomo Cantelmo (18 April 1685 – 10 December 1687)
- Bartolomeo Menatti (12 February 1689 – March 1692)
- Marcello d'Aste (23 February 1692 – May 1695)
- Michelangelo dei Conti (26 June 1695 – November 1697)
- Giulio Piazza (25 January 1698 – 4 June 1703)
- Vincenzo Bichi (5 January 1703 – 2 December 1709)
- Giacomo Caracciolo (10 May 1710 – 25 November 1716)
- Giuseppe Firrao (20 October 1716 – 15 November 1720)
- Domenico Silvio Passionei (30 July 1721 – 28 October 1730)
- Giovanni Battista Barni (22 February 1731 – 1 April 1739)
- Carlo Francesco Durini (1 August 1739 – 29 March 1744)
- Filippo Acciaioli (22 January 1744 – 25 April 1754)
- Girolamo Spínola (25 February 1754 – 24 August 1754)
- Giovanni Ottavio Bufalini (19 December 1754 – 4 November 1759)
- Niccolò Oddi, S.J. (21 December 1759 – January 1764)
- Giambattista Donati (February 1764 – November 1764)
- Luigi Valenti Gonzaga (18 August 1764 – November 1773)
- Giovanni Battista Caprara (6 September 1775 – 7 May 1785)
- Giuseppe Vinci (6 July 1785 – January 1794)
- Giovanni Francesco Guerrieri ( 1794 - 1795)
- Pietro Gravina (20 September 1794 – 1 March 1803)
- Fabrizio Sceberras Testaferrata (20 September 1803 - 1815)
- Carlo Zen (13 March 1816 – 27 August 1817)
- Vincenzo Macchi (8 August 1818 – 22 November 1819)
- Ignazio Nasalli-Ratti (21 January 1820 – 25 June 1827)
- Pietro Ostini (30 January 1827 – 17 July 1829)
- Tommaso Pasquale Gizzi (21 August 1827 – 15 September 1828)
- Filippo de Angelis (23 April 1830 – 15 February 1838)
- Tommaso Pasquale Gizzi (31 May 1839 – 23 April 1841)
- Girolamo d'Andrea (30 July 1841 – 30 August 1845)
- Alessandro Macioti (21 October 1845 – 11 April 1856)
- Luigi Maglione (1 September 1920 – 24 May 1926)
- Pietro di Maria (3 June 1926 – 1 September 1935)
- Filippo Bernardini (10 October 1935 – 15 January 1953)
- Gustavo Testa (6 March 1953 - 1959)
- Alfredo Pacini (4 February 1960 - 1967)
- Ambrogio Marchioni (30 June 1967 – September 1984)
- Edoardo Rovida (26 January 1985 – 15 March 1993)
- Karl-Josef Rauber (16 March 1993 – 25 April 1997)
- Oriano Quilici (8 July 1997 – 2 November 1998)
- Pier Giacomo De Nicolò (21 January 1999 – 8 September 2004)
- Francesco Canalini (8 September 2004 – April 2011)
- Diego Causero (28 May 2011 – 5 September 2015)
- Thomas Gullickson (5 September 2015 - 31 December 2020)
- Martin Krebs (3 March 2021 – present)
