= Fortunatus Nwachukwu =

Nigerian prelate of the Catholic Church (born 1960)

His Excellency, The Most Reverend Fortunatus Nwachukwu
- Secretary of the Section of First Evangelization of the Dicastery for Evangelization; Titular Archbishop of Aquaviva
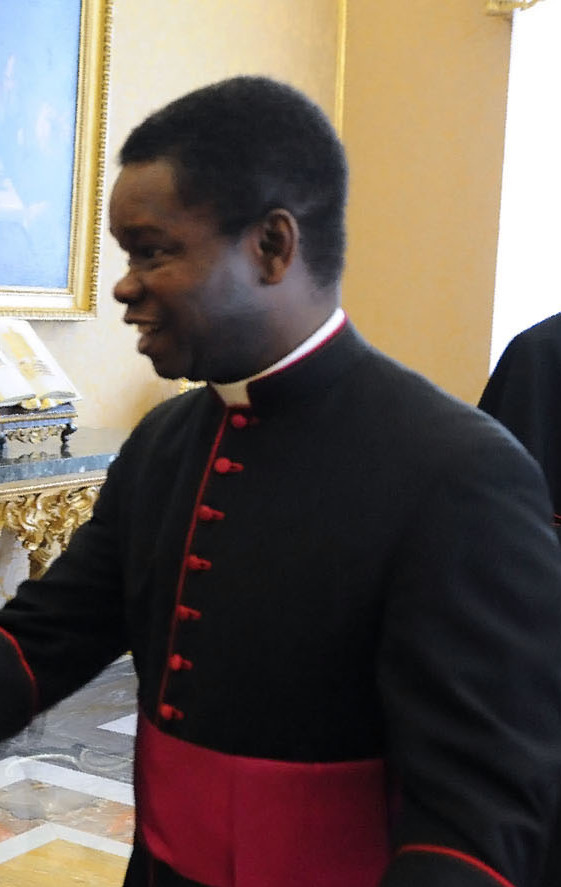
- Appointed: 17 December 2021
- Predecessor: Ivan Jurkovič
- Other post: Titular Archbishop of Aquaviva
- Previous posts: Apostolic Nuncio to Trinidad and Tobago, Antigua and Barbuda, Barbados, Dominica, Jamaica, Saint Kitts and Nevis, Saint Vincent and the Grenadines, Guyana, Saint Lucia, Grenada, the Bahamas, Suriname, Belize and Apostolic Delegate to the Antilles (2017-2021); Apostolic Nuncio to Nicaragua (2012-2017); Permanent Observer of the Holy See to the United Nations in Geneva (2017–2023)

Orders
- Ordination: 17 June 1984 by Anthony Gogo Nwedo
- Consecration: 6 January 2012 by Pope Benedict XVI, Tarcisio Bertone and Zenon Grocholewski

Personal details
- Born: 10 May 1960 (age 66) Umuogele Ntigha, Eastern Region, Federation of Nigeria
- Education: Pontifical University of Saint Thomas Aquinas
- Motto: SOLVERE CALCEAMENTA
- Coat of arms

Styles of Fortunatus Nwachukwu
- Reference style: The Most Reverend
- Spoken style: Your Excellency
- Religious style: Archbishop

Fortunatus Nwachukwu // (born 10 May 1960) is a Nigerian Catholic prelate who serves in the Roman Curia as secretary for the Section of First Evangelization in the Dicastery for Evangelization. He joined the diplomatic service of the Holy See in 1994 and has held the rank of apostolic nuncio since 2012, when he was also made an archbishop.

== Biography ==
Fortunatus Nwachukwu was born in Ntigha, in present-day Abia State, Nigeria, on 10 May 1960. (Note: He was born "in Umuokoro, Eziama-Ntigha, in Isia-Ala Ngwa North Local Government Area of Abia State".) He entered Immaculate Conception Seminary in Ahiaeke Umuahia in January 1972 and taught mathematics and Latin there from 1975 to 1977. He then studied at the philosophy faculty of the Bigard Memorial Seminary in Ikot Ekpene. He continued at the theology faculty from 1980 to 1984, earning his Bachelor of Divinity degree summa cum laude. He was ordained a priest for the Diocese of Umuahia on 17 June 1984 by Bishop Anthony Gogo Nwedo in St. Eugene Parish Church in Aba and incardinated in the newly created Diocese of Aba on 2 April 1990. After ordination he taught and then became vice-rector of the Immaculate Conception Seminary and parochial vicar and administrator of the St Anne's Parish in Ibeku from 1984 to 1986. At the same time, he was the diocesan vocations director and chaplain of the Federal College of Agriculture and the Umuahia Campus of Alvan Ikoku College of Education, both in Umudike-Umuahia.

Beginning in 1986 he studied at the Pontifical Biblical Institute in Rome, the Hebrew University in Jerusalem and the Philosophisch-Theologische Hochschule, Sankt Georgen, in Frankfurt, Germany. He earned a doctorate in theology at the Pontifical Urban University in 1994 with a dissertation on "The Birth of Systematic Theology in Contemporary Black Africa: An Investigation Into New Interpretations of the Christian Faith by the Newly Evangelized". He also studied diplomacy for two years at the Pontifical Ecclesiastical Academy and entered the diplomatic service of the Holy See on 1 July 1994. His first assignments were in Ghana, Paraguay, Algeria, and Geneva. (Note: As a member of the Holy See's staff in Geneva in March 2005, he addressed the executive committee of the U.N. High Commissioner for Refugees on the need for international aid in Sudan’s Darfur region.) He then worked in Rome in the Second Section of the Secretariat of State. At the Pontifical University of Saint Thomas Aquinas, Angelicum he completed a doctorate in canon law in 1996 with a dissertation entitled "Canons 364 and 365, the Holy See and the State of Israel: an example of the logic of pontifical diplomacy.

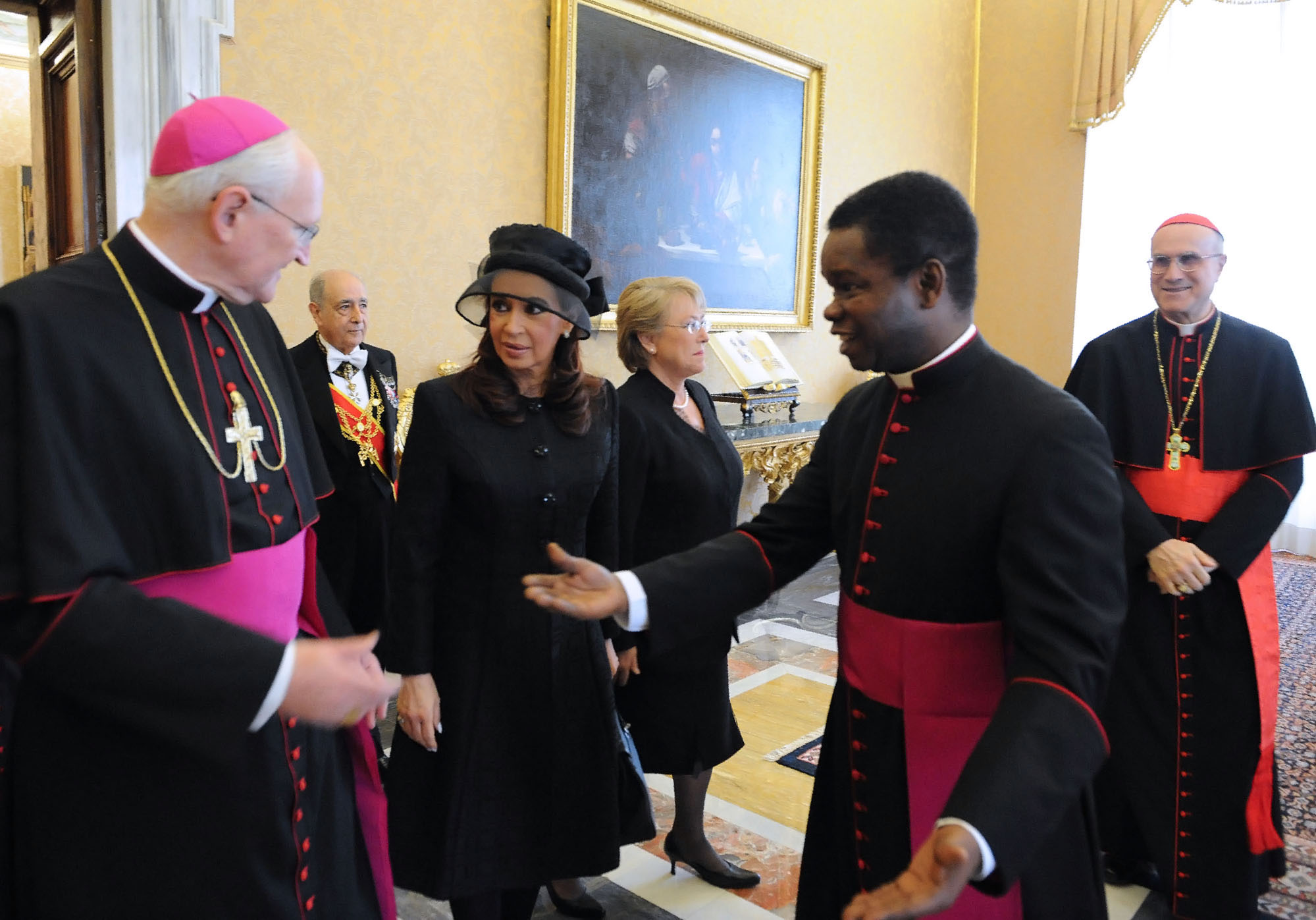
Nwachukwu in his role as Head of Protocol

He was appointed Chief of Protocol of the Secretariat of State on 4 September 2007. He speaks a number of languages including English, Italian, German, French, Spanish, in addition to Arabic.

On 12 November 2012, Pope Benedict XVI appointed him Titular Archbishop of Aquaviva and apostolic nuncio to Nicaragua. Pope Benedict consecrated him a bishop on 6 January 2013.

On 4 November 2017 Pope Francis appointed him apostolic nuncio to Trinidad and Tobago, Antigua and Barbuda, Barbados, Dominica, Jamaica, Saint Kitts and Nevis, Saint Vincent and the Grenadines, Guyana, and Apostolic Delegate to the Antilles. He received additional assignments: as Apostolic Nuncio to Saint Lucia, Grenada, and the Bahamas on 27 February 2018; as Apostolic Nuncio to Suriname on 9 March 2018; and Apostolic Nuncio to Belize on 8 September 2018.

On 17 December 2021, Pope Francis named him Permanent Observer of the Holy See to the United Nations in Geneva and at the World Trade Organisation (WTO) and Holy See Representative at the International Organization for Migration (IOM). During his last month in this position, he addressed the Human Rights Council on the deprivation of human rights in Nicaragua, noting "the reported closure of several independent media outlets and non-governmental organizations, including faith-based organizations, and the allegations of the systematic use of violence by law enforcement in a climate of general impunity".

On 23 December 2021, following his Christmas address to senior members of the Roman Curia, Pope Francis gave each attendee three books he recommended, including Nwachukwu's recent work on gossip, The Abused Word.

On 15 March 2023, Pope Francis named him secretary of the Section of First Evangelization of the Dicastery for Evangelization.

== Honours ==
He has received the following honours:

- Honorary Citizen of the State of Nebraska and the City of Lincoln (United States), 2008
- Officer of the Order of Merit of the Italian Republic, 2007
- Grand Officer of the Order of Bernardo O'Higgins (Chile), 2009
- Grand Cross of the Order of May (Argentina), 2011
- Grand Official of the Heraldic Order of Christopher Columbus (Dominican Republic), 2012
- Grand Cruz of the Order of José de Marcoleta (Nicaragua), 2018
- Title of "Chief Nwanne Di Na Mba 1 of Eziaba Agbani" awarded by the Eziaba Agbani Community of Enugu State, 2012

== Notes ==
Diplomatic posts
Preceded by Tommaso Caputo	Head of Protocol of Secretariat of State of the Holy See; 4 September 2007 – 12 November 2012	Succeeded by José Avelino Bettencourt
Preceded by Henryk Józef Nowacki	Apostolic Nuncio to Nicaragua; 12 November 2012 – 4 November 2017	Succeeded by Waldemar Stanisław Sommertag
Preceded by Ivan Jurkovič	Permanent Observer of the Holy See to the United Nations in Geneva; 17 December 2021 – 15 March 2023	Succeeded by Ettore Balestrero
Catholic Church titles
Preceded by Giovanni De Andrea	Titular Archbishop of Aquaviva; 2012 – present	Incumbent
