= Manuel Monteiro de Castro =

Portuguese prelate

His Eminence Manuel Monteiro de Castro
- Major Penitentiary emeritus of the Apostolic Penitentiary
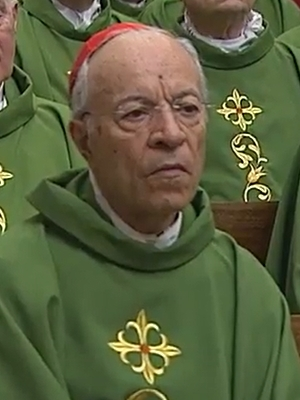
- Appointed: 5 January 2012
- Term ended: 21 September 2013
- Predecessor: Fortunato Baldelli
- Successor: Mauro Piacenza
- Other post: Cardinal priest of San Domenico di Guzman
- Previous posts: Apostolic Pro-Nuncio or Delegate to Bahamas, Barbados, Belize, Dominica, Grenada, Jamaica, Saint Lucia, Trinidad and Tobago, Antigua and Barbuda (1985–1990); Apostolic Nuncio to Honduras (1990–1991); Apostolic Nuncio to El Salvador (1990–1991); Apostolic Nuncio to South Africa, Namibia, Swaziland, and Lesotho (1998–2000); Apostolic Nuncio to Spain and Andorra (2000–2009); Secretary of the Congregation for Bishops (2009–2012)

Orders
- Ordination: 9 July 1961
- Consecration: 23 March 1985 by Agostino Casaroli
- Created cardinal: 18 February 2012 by Benedict XVI
- Rank: Cardinal deacon (2012–22); Cardinal priest (2022–present)

Personal details
- Born: Manuel Monteiro de Castro; 29 March 1938 (age 88) Santa Eufémia de Prazins, Guimarães, Portugal
- Denomination: Roman Catholic
- Motto: Mane nobiscum Domine (Remain with us, Lord)
- Coat of arms

Styles of Manuel Monteiro de Castro
- Reference style: The Most Reverend
- Spoken style: Your Eminence
- Religious style: Monsignor
- Informal style: Cardinal

Manuel Monteiro de Castro (born 29 March 1938) is a Portuguese prelate of the Catholic Church who worked in the diplomatic service of the Holy See from 1967 to 2009, with the rank of archbishop and the title of nuncio from 1985. His assignments as nuncio included the Caribbean, South Africa, Central America, and Spain. He ended his career in senior positions in the Roman Curia from 2009 to 2013. He was made a cardinal in 2012.

== Early years ==
Monteiro de Castro was born on 29 March 1938 in Santa Eufémia de Prazins, Guimarães, Portugal. He studied humanities, philosophy and theology in the Archdiocese of Braga. He was ordained to the priesthood by Archbishop António Bento Júnior on 9 July 1961. He then studied at the Pontifical Gregorian University in Rome, earning a doctorate in canon law in June 1967. He also trained for a career as a diplomat at the Pontifical Ecclesiastical Academy. In February 1969, he became an advocate in the Sacred Roman Rota.

== Diplomat ==
He entered the diplomatic service of the Holy See in 1967. He was created Chaplain of His Holiness on 1 July 1968. He served as secretary of the nunciatures in Panama from 1967 to 1969, Guatemala from 1969 until 1972, Việt Nam and Cambodia from 1972 until 1975, Australia from 1975 to 1978, and Mexico from 1978 to June 1981. He was upgraded to prelate of honour of His Holiness on 1 July 1981. He then worked in the Second Section of the Secretariat of State from June to November 1981. He was counselor of the nunciature in Belgium from the end of 1981 until 1985.

On 16 February 1985, Pope John Paul II appointed him titular archbishop of Beneventum; Apostolic Pro-Nuncio to the Bahamas, Barbados, Belize, Dominica, Grenada, Jamaica, Saint Lucia, and Trinidad and Tobago; and Apostolic Delegate to the other territories in the Antilles. His title change to Apostolic Nuncio to Granada on 30 April. He was consecrated a bishop by Cardinal Secretary of State Agostino Casaroli. He became in addition Apostolic Nuncio to Antigua and Barbuda on 25 April 1987.

He was named Apostolic Nuncio to both Honduras and El Salvador on 21 August 1990, but was replaced in Honduras by Luigi Conti on 12 April 1991.

In 1998, he was appointed Apostolic Nuncio to South Africa, Namibia, and Swaziland on 2 February and Apostolic Nuncio to Lesotho on 7 March.

On 1 March 2000, he was appointed Apostolic Nuncio to Spain and Andorra. He met with José Luis Rodríguez Zapatero to reduce tension between the Spanish government and the Church. Addressing a conference of Spanish bishops in 2004, he proposed they support the legal recognition of same-sex relationships called something other than "marriages". He said: "The new political situation in which we are living in Spain sets new challenges in the spreading of the gospel and we must meet those challenges in an appropriate manner.... There are other forms of cohabitation and it is good that they be recognised."

On 7 December 2007, he was given the added role of Permanent Observer of the Holy See to the World Tourism Organization (UNWTO).

== Roman Curia ==
On 3 July 2009, Pope Benedict ended his diplomatic career by appointing him Secretary of the Congregation for Bishops. He was given additional responsibility as Secretary of the College of Cardinals on 21 October 2009. He was named a consultor to the Congregation for the Doctrine of the Faith on 19 November 2009.

On 5 January 2012, Monteiro de Castro was appointed Major Penitentiary of the Apostolic Penitentiary.

== Cardinal ==
On 6 January 2012, Pope Benedict XVI announced he would make Monteiro de Castro a cardinal on 18 February. He was created Cardinal-Deacon of San Domenico di Guzman on that day. On 21 April 2012, Monteiro de Castro was appointed a member of the Pontifical Council for the Pastoral Care of Migrants and Itinerants, Congregation for the Causes of Saints and the Congregation for Bishops.

He was one of the cardinal electors who participated in the 2013 papal conclave that elected Pope Francis.

On 4 March 2022, he was elevated to the rank of cardinal priest.

== Honors ==
- In 1985, he was awarded Knight Grand Cross of the Order of Infante Dom Henrique, granted by Prime Minister Mário Soares.
- In 2003, he was decorated with the Knight Grand Cross of the Military Order of Christ, granted by the minister of Foreign Affairs.

== See also ==
- Apostolic Nuncio
- List of diplomatic missions of the Holy See

Diplomatic posts
| Preceded by Paul Fouad Naïm Tabet | Apostolic Pro-Nuncio to Bahamas; 16 February 1985 – 21 August 1990 | Succeeded by Eugenio Sbarbaro |
| Preceded by Paul Fouad Naïm Tabet | Apostolic Pro-Nuncio to Barbados; 16 February 1985 – 21 August 1990 | Succeeded by Eugenio Sbarbaro |
| Preceded by Paul Fouad Naïm Tabet | Apostolic Pro-Nuncio to Belize; 16 February 1985 – 21 August 1990 | Succeeded by Giacinto Berloco |
| Preceded by Paul Fouad Naïm Tabet | Apostolic Pro-Nuncio to Jamaica; 16 February 1985 – 21 August 1990 | Succeeded by Eugenio Sbarbaro |
| Preceded by Paul Fouad Naïm Tabet | Apostolic Pro-Nuncio to Trinidad and Tobago; 16 February 1985 – 21 August 1990 | Succeeded by Eugenio Sbarbaro |
| New creation | Apostolic Pro-Nuncio to Dominica; 16 February 1985 – 21 August 1990 | Succeeded by Eugenio Sbarbaro |
| New creation | Apostolic Pro-Nuncio to Grenada; 16 February 1985 – 21 August 1990 | Succeeded by Eugenio Sbarbaro |
| New creation | Apostolic Pro-Nuncio to Saint Lucia; 16 February 1985 – 21 August 1990 | Succeeded by Eugenio Sbarbaro |
| New creation | Apostolic Pro-Nuncio to Antigua and Barbuda; 25 April 1987 – 21 August 1990 | Succeeded by Eugenio Sbarbaro |
| Preceded by Francesco De Nittis | Apostolic Nuncio to El Salvador; 21 August 1990 – 2 February 1998 | Succeeded by Giacinto Berloco |
| Preceded by Francesco De Nittis | Apostolic Nuncio to Honduras; 21 August 1990 – 12 April 1991 | Succeeded by Luigi Conti |
| Preceded by Ambrose Battista De Paoli | Apostolic Nuncio to South Africa; 2 February 1998 – 1 March 2000 | Succeeded by Blasco Francisco Collaço |
| Preceded by Ambrose Battista De Paoli | Apostolic Nuncio to Namibia; 2 February 1998 – 1 March 2000 | Succeeded by Blasco Francisco Collaço |
| Preceded by Ambrose Battista De Paoli | Apostolic Nuncio to Swaziland; 2 February 1998 – 1 March 2000 | Succeeded by Blasco Francisco Collaço |
| Preceded by Ambrose Battista De Paoli | Apostolic Nuncio to Lesotho; 2 February 1998 – 1 March 2000 | Succeeded by Blasco Francisco Collaço |
| Preceded by Lajos Kada | Apostolic Nuncio to Spain; 1 March 2000 – 3 July 2009 | Succeeded by Renzo Fratini |
| Preceded by Lajos Kada | Apostolic Nuncio to Andorra; 1 March 2000 – 3 July 2009 | Succeeded by Renzo Fratini |
Catholic Church titles
| Preceded by Francesco Monterisi | Secretary of the Congregation for Bishops; 3 July 2009 – 5 January 2012 | Succeeded by Lorenzo Baldisseri |
| Preceded by Fortunato Baldelli | Major Penitentiary of the Apostolic Penitentiary; 5 January 2012 – 21 September 2013 | Succeeded by Mauro Piacenza |
