= Ambrogio Marchioni =

Italian prelate

Ambrogio Marchioni (31 August 1911 – 2 May 1995) was an Italian prelate of the Catholic Church who worked in the diplomatic service of the Holy See. He was made an archbishop in 1961 and served as Apostolic Nuncio to several countries from 1959 to 1984, including Switzerland for seventeen years.

== Biography ==
Ambrogio Marchioni was born in Naples, Italy, on 31 August 1911. He was ordained a priest of the Diocese of Naples on 26 May 1934. To prepare for a diplomatic career he entered the Pontifical Ecclesiastical Academy in 1934.

When he joined the diplomatic service of the Holy See, one of his early assignments was in the Nunciature to Italy at least as early as the end of 1940. He was secretary there on 15 October 1943 when Defence Minister Rodolfo Graziani asked him to support or express sympathy for the Italian Social Republic, the puppet state the Nazis had established. Marchioni responded by reiterating the neutrality of the Church and the Holy See and the need rather to "instill calm, tranquility, order, so as to ensure that ill-advised actions do not produce serious reprisals against so many innocent people or the entire population".

On 1 July 1959, Pope Pius XII appointed him Apostolic Nuncio El Salvador and to the Guatemala. He was named titular archbishop of Severiana on 14 October 1961 and received his episcopal consecration on 12 November 1961 from Cardinal Carlo Confalonieri.

His appointments in those countries ended with the appointment of his successor, Bruno Torpigliani on 1 September 1964.

On 30 June 1967, Pope Paul named him Apostolic Nuncio to Switzerland. He retired in September 1984.

He died in Rome on 27 February 1989.
