= Apostolic Nunciature to Suriname =

Diplomatic Mission of the Holy See in South America

The Apostolic Nunciature to Suriname is an ecclesiastical office of the Catholic Church in Suriname. It is a diplomatic post of the Holy See, whose representative is called the Apostolic Nuncio with the rank of an ambassador. The title Apostolic Nuncio to Suriname is held by the prelate appointed Apostolic Nuncio to Trinidad and Tobago; he resides in Trinidad and Tobago.

== List of papal representatives to the Suriname ==
Apostolic Nuncios

- Eugenio Sbarbaro (13 July 1994 - 26 April 2000)
- Emil Paul Tscherrig (20 January 2001 - 22 May 2004)
- Thomas Edward Gullickson (15 December 2004 – 21 May 2011)
- Nicola Girasoli (29 October 2011 – 16 June 2017)
- Fortunatus Nwachukwu (9 March 2018 – 17 December 2021)
- Santiago de Wit Guzmán (30 July 2022 – 25 May 2026)

== See also ==
- Apostolic Delegation to the Antilles
