= Michael Seed =

British Catholic priest (born 1957)

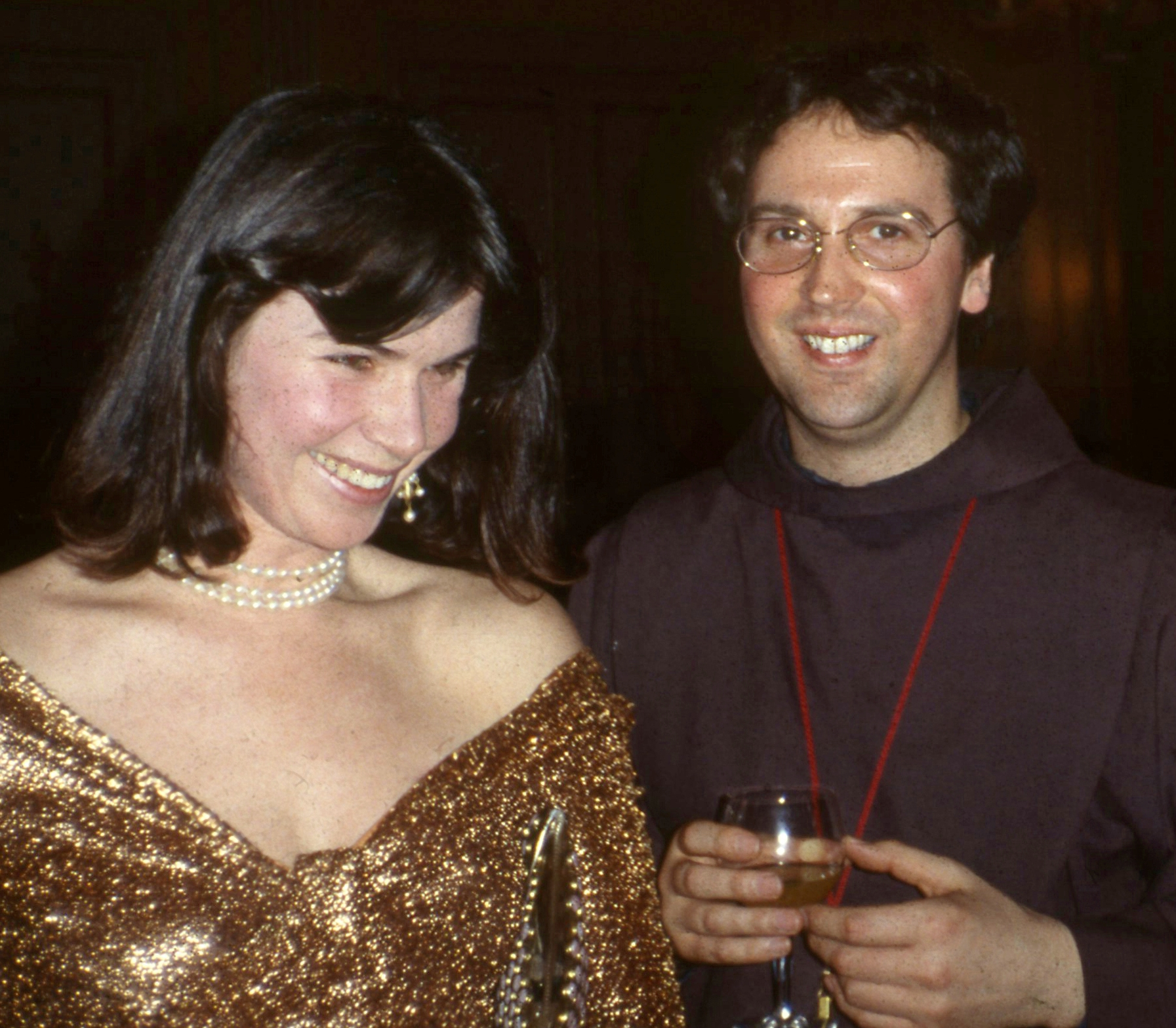
At a party following his appearance on television series After Dark in 1991

Michael Seed (born 1957) is a British Catholic priest, Franciscan friar and author. He was an ecumenical advisor to the archbishops of Westminster Basil Hume and Cormac Murphy-O'Connor. He has been linked to the decision of various politicians and other public figures to convert to Roman Catholicism.

== Early life ==
Michael Seed was born in Manchester in 1957 to a young woman named Marie Godwin. He was baptised in the Catholic Church as an infant with the names Steven Wayne. In 1958, he was adopted by Joseph and Lillian Seed. During his early childhood he and Lillian were subjected to abuse by his adoptive father, resulting in a number of suicide attempts by his mother. Seed was also bullied at school. Following the suicide of his mother in 1966 and the death of his father in 1968, he was brought up by his maternal grandmother.

Found to be dyslexic, in 1970 Seed became a pupil at Knowl View residential school for maladjusted children in Rochdale, where he remained for four years. His 2007 autobiography, Nobody's Child, later became an important source for the Independent Inquiry into Childhood Sexual Abuse investigating the abuse of pupils there at this time. Seed, who was himself abused by one of the teachers, described the level of sexual abuse at Knowl View as "beyond horror".

After leaving school, Seed worked at the Knutsford motorway service station, but was sacked for breakages; he then lost another job in catering.

== Vocation ==
In his youth, Seed joined several different Christian denominations, including Roman Catholicism, Anglicanism, the Salvation Army, the Baptist Union, and the Strict and Particular Baptists. In 1976, at the age of 18, he joined the Roman Catholic Society of African Missions (SMA) and spent a year at its novitiate in Cork, Ireland. After the novitiate he went to the SMA's house in New Barnet in north London and attended the then Missionary Institute in Mill Hill, which prepared men of several religious congregations for ministry in Afric], Asia and Latin America.

Seed struck up a relationship with the Franciscan Friars of the Atonement (the Society of the Atonement), who ran a library close to Westminster Cathedral, and eventually left his missionary society to join them, taking his first vows in 1982. He was ordained a priest on 18 January 1986.

== Career ==
In 1988, Cardinal Basil Hume assigned Seed to the post of Secretary for Ecumenical Affairs at Westminster Cathedral.

Seeds arrival as ecumenical adviser to Cardinal Hume came at the same time as the Church of England's decision to ordain women as priests, which led many high-church Anglicans to consider leaving that church. Seed helped many people, including the politicians Ann Widdecombe and John Gummer and also the Duchess of Kent, in their decision to enter the Roman Catholic Church.

On 16 February 1991, Seed appeared on an After Dark television discussion programme about sexaholics.

In 2003 Seed’s portrait was painted by the artist Christian Furr.

Before Tony Blair's conversion to Roman Catholicism in December 2007, while he was still prime minister, Seed celebrated Masses for Blair and his family at 10 Downing Street. He was also a friend of other well-known figures, including Charles Kennedy and Terry Wogan.

In 2007, it was reported that Seed was in trouble with Cardinal Cormac Murphy-O'Connor, who was allegedly upset that Seed had introduced rich business men to government officials in an attempt to secure financing for Labour's flagship academies project. Some speculated that Murphy-O'Connor saw this move by Seed as unwarranted support of specific Labour policies. Murphy-O'Connor was also reported as being annoyed at Seed's claim in May 2007 that Tony Blair would become a Catholic upon leaving 10 Downing Street. Blair did indeed become a convert shortly after leaving office in 2007. However, Seed only vacated his position as ecumenical advisor when Murphy-O'Connor retired in 2008 and was succeeded as Archbishop of Westminster by Archbishop Vincent Nichols.

In 2010 it was reported that Seed had had a minor heart attack while conducting a retreat in Florida and had subsequently been advised to have a complete rest. The following year, it was reported that Seed had been suspended by the Society of the Atonement due to financial irregularities and accusations concerning the sale of papal knighthoods. In 2017, Seed did not appear in the society's list of friars.

== Assessments ==
In an article in the Daily Telegraph in 2007, an anonymous friend was quoted as saying of Seed, "I've seen him after he has drunk far too much white wine in Soho. And I've seen his deeply spiritual side. He really does care. He is an extraordinary, special chap. A party in my garden once attracted the attention of the noise abatement people. He charmed them to death – they thought he was in fancy dress – and they gave up and went away. He's always up to adventures and mishaps."

In January 2008, Peter Stanford, writing in The Independent, answered allegations against Seed of indiscretion and suggested that if Seed were indiscreet "the queue of people wanting to sit where I am now would quickly disappear". Of Seed celebrating Mass at 10 Downing Street, Stanford noted: "Father Seed is eager to portray this special treatment not as a privilege, but as a kind of torture. "Mrs Blair" – he never uses their first names – absolutely hated it. She hated not being able to go to Mass with everyone else."

When Seed was replaced at Westminster Cathedral in April 2008, Catherine Pepinster, editor of The Tablet, commented: "Many Catholics are dismayed by the departure of Father Seed. He has been a fixture of Catholic life in London for many years and has done much to raise the church's profile." The Roman Catholic peer Lord Alton said at the same time: "I hope that any decision taken about his future will ensure that his wonderful gifts are used in the most productive way. Father Michael is hugely respected at Westminster where he has quietly undertaken very considerable pastoral work."

In August 2009, A. N. Wilson wrote of Seed in The Observer: "He has now left Westminster Cathedral but he will surely not have left the public stage. Where two or three Hello!-style celebs are gathered together, Father Michael Seed will surely be there in their midst, managing to be both clumsily sycophantic and intrusive." Regarding an alleged claim, by Seed, that Alan Clark had converted on his death bed, Wilson asked "Which of the two – the dead Clark or God – leaked the story of his deathbed conversion to a newspaper we shall never know."

When Seed’s book Sinners and Saints appeared in 2009, The Daily Telegraph "enjoyed the strange tale of carnality and cardinals", but a reviewer in the Church Times called it an "unpriestly book" and "careless talk" and concluded "The overwhelming feeling with which the reader is left, however, is of a small boy desperate to be loved."

== Honours ==
In 2004, Pope John Paul II made Seed an award of honour for his work.

== Publications ==
Seed has written several, books including his autobiographical Nobody's Child (2008), which has been described as a "blazing testament to one human's raw courage, and his remarkable ability to finally triumph over the horrors of a stolen childhood". His other books include Thinking of Becoming a Catholic (2007) and I Will See You in Heaven (1996), Will I See You in Heaven (1999) and Letters from the Heart (2000). One of his first books, I Will See You in Heaven, Where Animals Don't Bite (1991) is a collection of letters about heaven by various famous people with a foreword by Mother Teresa of Calcutta. Cardinal Basil Hume was one of the book's contributors and enjoyed a very close relationship with Seed, who helped him raise funds for a homeless centre, The Passage, which is still going. One of the fund raising events arranged by Seed was the annual "A Night Under The Stars".

On 15 July 2009, Seed launched the second volume of his autobiography, Sinners and Saints, at Stringfellows, a party club in London's West End.

- Michael Seed, I Will See You in Heaven, Where Animals Don't Bite (1991)
- Michael Seed, Will I See You in Heaven? (1999)
- Michael Seed, Letters from the Heart (2000)
- Michael Seed, Thinking of Becoming a Catholic (2007)
- Michael Seed, Nobody's Child (John Blake Publishing Ltd., 2007, autobiography) ISBN 978-1-84454-343-4
- Michael Seed, Sinners and Saints (2009, autobiography)
