= Emil Paul Tscherrig =

Swiss Catholic cardinal and diplomat (1947–2026)

His Eminence Emil Paul Tscherrig
- Cardinal; Apostolic Nuncio
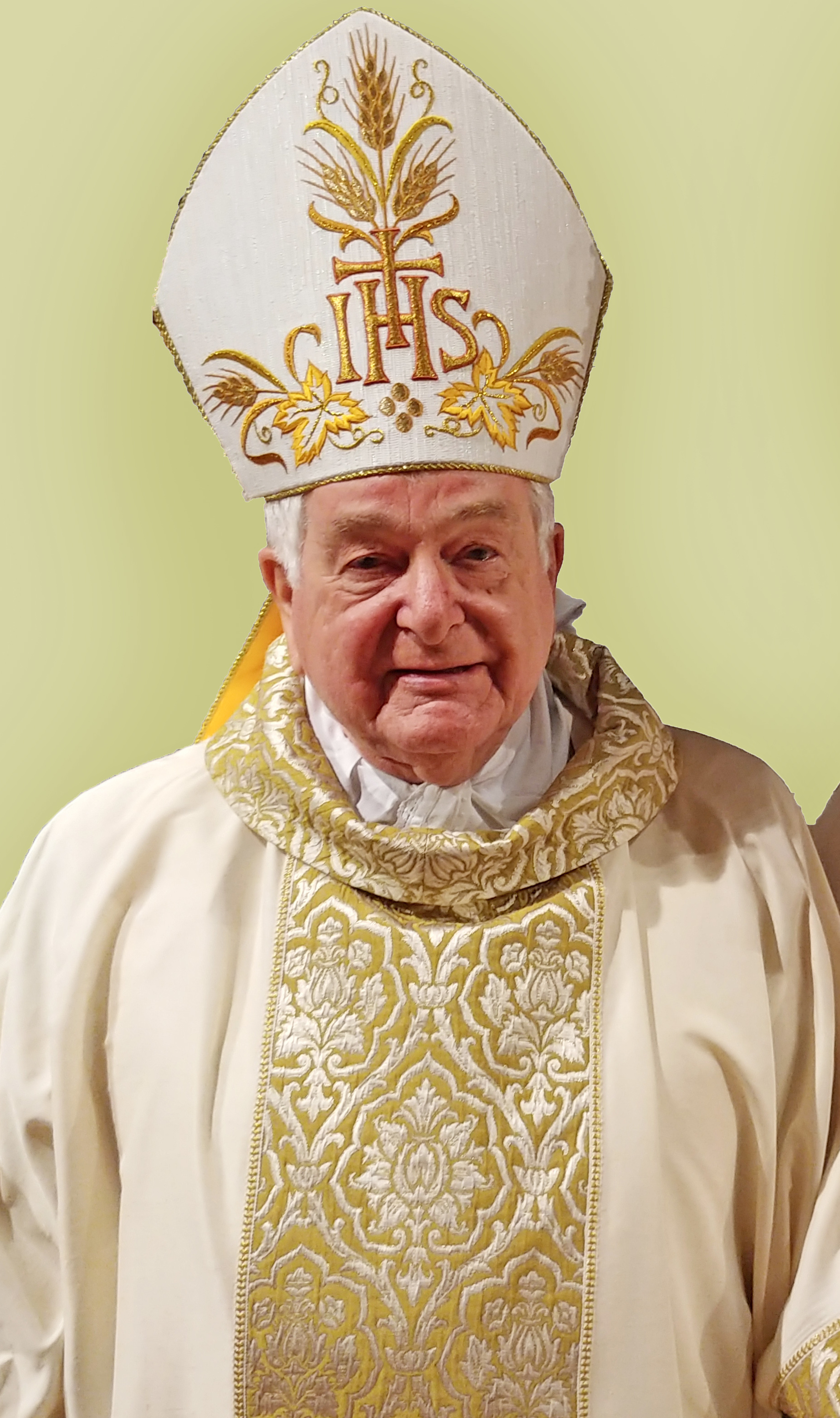
- Tscherrig in 2019
- Appointed: 4 May 1996
- Retired: 11 March 2024
- Predecessor: Adriano Bernardini as Nuncio to Italy
- Successor: Petar Rajič
- Other post: Cardinal-Deacon of San Giuseppe in Via Trionfale (2023–2026)
- Previous posts: Titular Archbishop of Voli (1996–2023); Apostolic Nuncio to Burundi (1996–2000); Apostolic Nuncio to Trinidad and Tobago, Dominica, Jamaica, Guyana, Saint Lucia, Saint Vincent and the Grenadines, the Bahamas and Apostolic Delegate to the Antilles (2000–2004); Apostolic Nuncio to Antigua and Barbuda, Barbados, Saint Kitts and Nevis, Grenada, Suriname and Belize (2001–2004); Apostolic Nuncio to Korea and Mongolia (2004–2008); Apostolic Nuncio to Sweden, Denmark, Finland, Iceland and Norway (2008–2012); Apostolic Nuncio to Argentina (2012-2017); Apostolic Nuncio to Italy and San Marino (2017–2024)

Orders
- Ordination: 11 April 1974 by François-Nestor Adam
- Consecration: 27 June 1996 by Angelo Sodano, Henri Schwery and Norbert Brunner
- Created cardinal: 30 September 2023 by Pope Francis
- Rank: Cardinal Deacon

Personal details
- Born: 3 February 1947 Unterems, Valais, Switzerland
- Died: 12 May 2026 (aged 79) Vatican City
- Education: Pontifical Ecclesiastical Academy
- Motto: Spes mea Christus (Christ, my hope)
- Coat of arms

Styles of Emil Paul Tscherrig
- Reference style: His Eminence
- Spoken style: Your Eminence
- Religious style: Cardinal
- Informal style: Cardinal

Emil Paul Tscherrig (3 February 1947 – 12 May 2026) was a Swiss prelate of the Catholic Church who spent his career in the diplomatic service of the Holy See. He became an archbishop in 1996 and held assignments as Apostolic Nuncio to several countries. He was nuncio to Italy and San Marino when he retired from the diplomatic service in 2024.

Tscherrig served as the Titular Archbishop of Voli from 1996 to 2023. He was made a cardinal by Pope Francis on 30 September 2023 and served as a cardinal elector in the 2025 conclave.

== Early life ==
Emil Paul Tscherrig was born in Unterems on 3 February 1947, the eldest of eight children in a family of mountain farmers.

Tscherrig studied at the Collegium Brig from 1961 to 1968. He struggled with his decision to become a priest, only deciding while performing his military service. He studied philosophy and theology at the seminary in Sion and at the University of Freiburg, earning a Licentiate in Catholic theology in 1974.

== Career ==
Tscherrig was ordained a priest on 11 April 1974 for the Diocese of Sion. While preparing for a diplomatic career with studies at the Pontifical Ecclesiastical Academy, he earned a doctorate in canon law at the Pontifical Gregorian University with a thesis on the concept of the ecumenical council since Trent.

On 4 May 1996, Pope John Paul II named him titular archbishop of Voli. He received his episcopal consecration from Cardinal Angelo Sodano on 27 June.

=== Diplomatic service ===
He entered the diplomatic service of the Holy See on 1 April 1978. In addition to assignments as secretary in the nunciatures in Uganda and Bangladesh, he also worked in Rome in the Secretariat of State from 1985 to 1996, assisting in preparations for Pope John Paul II's international trips. In 1996, he was appointed Apostolic Nuncio to Burundi.

On 8 July 2000, John Paul named him Delegate to the Antilles and Nuncio to Trinidad and Tobago, Dominica, Jamaica, Grenada, Guyana, Saint Lucia, Saint Vincent and the Grenadines, and the Bahamas. On 20 January 2001, John Paul named him Nuncio to Barbados, Antigua and Barbuda, and Suriname as well. On 1 June 2001, he was made Nuncio to Saint Kitts and Nevis as well.

On 22 May 2004, he was named Nuncio to Korea and on 17 June Nuncio to Mongolia as well.

On 26 January 2008, Pope Benedict XVI named him Nuncio to Sweden, Denmark, Finland, Iceland, and Norway.

On 5 January 2012 he was named Nuncio to Argentina. On the night of his election to the papacy, Pope Francis called Tscherrig to ask him to inform the Argentine Catholic hierarchy and community that they could miss his investiture as Bishop of Rome and instead perform an act of charity with the money they would have spent.

In 2016, Pope Francis sent Tscherrig to Venezuela to initiate dialogue between the Vatican and the government of Nicolas Maduro. In October 2016, Francis would privately meet with Maduro which led to Maduro agreeing to meet with opposition leaders in Venezuela.

On 12 September 2017, Pope Francis named him Nuncio to Italy and San Marino. He was the first non-Italian ever to hold the position of Apostolic Nuncio to Italy. He was charged with helping plan for the merger of dioceses in Italy, and he took on a greater public role than is traditional for nuncios.

Pope Francis accepted his resignation as nuncio to Italy and San Marino on 11 March 2024. During his diplomatic service, he was considered to be an influential figure in foreign policy within the Vatican.

=== Cardinalate ===
On 9 July 2023, Pope Francis announced he plans to make him a cardinal at a consistory scheduled for 30 September. At that consistory he was made Cardinal-Deacon of San Giuseppe al Trionfale.

Francis had also appointed him to several Curial positions: member of the Supreme Tribunal of the Apostolic Signatura on 4 October 2023; member of the Dicastery for the Causes of Saints on 17 February 2024; and member of the Dicastery for Evangelization and of the Dicastery for Bishops on 18 May 2024. Francis named him to the Commission of Cardinals that oversees the work of the Institute for the Works of Religion (Vatican Bank) on 28 October 2024. He supported efforts to increase lay participation in Church governance and the Synodal process.

Tscherrig participated as a cardinal elector in the 2025 conclave that elected Pope Leo XIV.

== Death ==
Tscherrig died on 12 May 2026, at the age of 79, in his residence at the Domus Sanctae Marthae in Vatican City. Pope Leo XIV presided over his funeral. Tscherrig's final public appearance was on 6 May during the swearing-in of new members of the Pontifical Swiss Guard.

== See also ==
- Cardinals created by Francis
- List of heads of the diplomatic missions of the Holy See
