= Umuogele Ntigha =

Umuogele Ntigha // is one of the villages that make up the Avoh Na Ogele autonomous community of Ntigha, Abia State, Nigeria.

== See also ==
- List of villages in Abia State
