= Apostolic Nunciature to Italy =

Vatican ambassador in Rome

- Address: Via Po, 27-29, 00198 Roma, Italy
- Apostolic Nuncio: Edgar Peña Parra

The Apostolic Nunciature to Italy is an ecclesiastical office of the Catholic Church in Italy. It is a diplomatic post of the Holy See, whose representative is called the Apostolic Nuncio with the rank of an ambassador. The Apostolic Nuncio to Italy is usually also the Apostolic Nuncio to San Marino upon his appointment to said nation.

== Apostolic Nuncios to Italy ==
All the apostolic nuncios were Italian until the 2017 appointment of Emil Paul Tscherrig, who was Swiss.

- Francesco Borgongini Duca (30 June 1929 – 12 January 1953)
- Giuseppe Fietta (26 January 1953 – 15 December 1958)
- Carlo Grano (15 December 1958 – 26 June 1967)
- Egano Righi-Lambertini (8 July 1967 – 23 April 1969)
- Romolo Carboni (26 April 1969 – 19 April 1986)
- Luigi Poggi (19 April 1986 – 9 April 1992)
- Carlo Furno (15 April 1992 – 26 November 1994)
- Francesco Colasuonno (12 November 1994 – 21 February 1998)
- Andrea Cordero Lanza di Montezemolo (7 March 1998 – 17 April 2001)
- Paolo Romeo (17 April 2001 – 19 December 2006)
- Giuseppe Bertello (19 December 2006 – 1 October 2011)
- Adriano Bernardini (15 November 2011 – 12 September 2017)
- Emil Paul Tscherrig (12 September 2017 – 11 March 2024)
- Petar Rajič (11 March 2024 – 30 March 2026)
- Edgar Peña Parra (30 March 2026 – present)

== See also ==
- Foreign relations of the Holy See
- List of diplomatic missions of the Holy See
