= Apostolic Nunciature to Guyana =

Diplomatic post of the Holy See

The Apostolic Nunciature to Guyana is an ecclesiastical office of the Catholic Church in Guyana. It is a diplomatic post of the Holy See, whose representative is called the Apostolic Nuncio with the rank of an ambassador. The title Apostolic Nuncio to Guyana is held by the prelate appointed Apostolic Nuncio to Trinidad and Tobago; he resides in Trinidad and Tobago.

== List of papal representatives to Guyana ==
Apostolic Nuncios

- Eugenio Sbarbaro (26 August 1997 – 26 April 2000)
- Emil Paul Tscherrig (8 July 2000 – 22 May 2004)
- Thomas Edward Gullickson (15 December 2004 – 21 May 2011)
- Nicola Girasoli (29 October 2011 – 16 June 2017)
- Fortunatus Nwachukwu (4 November 2017 – 17 December 2021)
- Santiago de Wit Guzmán (30 July 2022 – 25 May 2026)

== See also ==
- Apostolic Delegation to the Antilles
- List of diplomatic missions in Guyana
