= Apostolic Nunciature to San Marino =

Diplomatic mission of the Holy See in Europe

The Apostolic Nunciature to San Marino is an ecclesiastical office of the Catholic Church to San Marino. It is a diplomatic post of the Holy See, located in Rome, whose representative is called the Apostolic Nuncio with the rank of an ambassador.

== Apostolic Nuncios to San Marino ==
The first Nuncio to San Marino, Pier Luigi Celata, held other assignments at the same time, including Nuncio to Malta (1988–1995) and to Slovenia (1992–1995). The next Nuncio to San Marino, Francesco Colasuonno, had already been Apostolic Nuncio to Italy for several months when named to the San Marino posting in April 1995. Since then all Nuncios to Italy and San Marino have held both positions for the same dates of service.

- Pier Luigi Celata (7 May 1988 - 6 February 1995)
- Francesco Colasuonno (22 April 1995 - 21 February 1998)
- Andrea Cordero Lanza di Montezemolo (7 March 1998 - 17 April 2001)
- Paolo Romeo (17 April 2001 - 19 December 2006)
- Giuseppe Bertello (11 January 2007 - 1 October 2011)
- Adriano Bernardini (15 November 2011 - 12 September 2017)
- Emil Paul Tscherrig (12 September 2017 - 11 March 2024)
- Petar Rajič (11 March 2024 - 30 March 2026)
- Edgar Peña Parra (30 March 2026 – present)

== See also ==
- Foreign relations of the Holy See
- List of diplomatic missions of the Holy See
