= Apostolic Nunciature to Liechtenstein =

Diplomatic post of the Holy See in Liechtenstein

The Apostolic Nunciature to Liechtenstein is an ecclesiastical office of the Catholic Church in Liechtenstein. It is a diplomatic post of the Holy See, whose representative is called the Apostolic Nuncio with the rank of an ambassador. The title Apostolic Nuncio to Liechtenstein is held by the prelate appointed Apostolic Nuncio to Switzerland; he resides in Switzerland.

== List of papal representatives to Liechtenstein ==
Apostolic Nuncios

- Edoardo Rovida (7 March 1987 – 15 March 1993)
- Karl-Josef Rauber (16 March 1993 – 25 April 1997)
- Oriano Quilici (8 July 1997 – 2 November 1998)
- Pier Giacomo De Nicolò (21 January 1999 – 8 September 2004)
- Francesco Canalini (8 September 2004 – April 2011)
- Diego Causero (28 May 2011 – 5 September 2015)
- Thomas Gullickson (5 September 2015 - 31 December 2020)
- Martin Krebs (3 March 2021 – present)
