= Apostolic Nunciature to Saint Kitts and Nevis =

Diplomatic mission of the Holy See in the Caribbean

The Apostolic Nunciature to Saint Kitts and Nevis is an ecclesiastical office of the Catholic Church in Saint Kitts and Nevis. It is a diplomatic post of the Holy See, whose representative is called the Apostolic Nuncio with the rank of an ambassador. The title Apostolic Nuncio to Saint Kitts and Nevis is held by the prelate appointed Apostolic Nuncio to Trinidad and Tobago; he resides in Trinidad and Tobago.

== List of papal representatives to Saint Kitts and Nevis ==
Apostolic Nuncios

- Eugenio Sbarbaro (23 October 1999 – 26 April 2000)
- Emil Paul Tscherrig (1 June 2001 – 22 May 2004)
- Thomas Edward Gullickson (2 October 2004 – 21 May 2011)
- Nicola Girasoli (29 October 2011 – 16 June 2017)
- Fortunatus Nwachukwu (4 November 2017 – 17 December 2021)
- Santiago de Wit Guzmán (30 July 2022 – 25 May 2026)

== See also ==
- Apostolic Delegation to the Antilles
