= Apostolic Nunciature to Jamaica =

Diplomatic post of the Holy See

The Apostolic Nunciature to Jamaica is an ecclesiastical office of the Catholic Church in Jamaica. It is a diplomatic post of the Holy See, whose representative is called the Apostolic Nuncio with the rank of an ambassador. The title Apostolic Nuncio to Jamaica is held by the prelate appointed Apostolic Nuncio to Trinidad and Tobago; he resides in Trinidad and Tobago.

== List of papal representatives to Jamaica ==
Apostolic Pro-Nuncios

- Paul Fouad Naïm Tabet (9 February 1980 – 8 September 1984)
- Manuel Monteiro de Castro (16 February 1985 – 21 August 1990)
- Eugenio Sbarbaro (7 February 1991 – 26 April 2000)

Apostolic Nuncios

- Emil Paul Tscherrig (8 July 2000 – 22 May 2004)
- Thomas Edward Gullickson (15 December 2004 – 21 May 2011)
- Nicola Girasoli (29 October 2011 – 16 June 2017)
- Fortunatus Nwachukwu (4 November 2017 – 17 December 2021)
- Santiago de Wit Guzmán (12 November 2022 – 25 May 2026)

== See also ==
- Apostolic Delegation to the Antilles
