= Santiago de Wit Guzmán =

Spanish prelate of the Catholic Church (born 1964)

His Excellency, The Most Reverend Santiago de Wit Guzmán
- Apostolic Nuncio of The Netherlands; Titular Archbishop of Gabala
- Appointed: 25 May 2026
- Predecessor: Jean-Marie Speich
- Other post: Titular Archbishop of Gabala
- Previous posts: Apostolic Nuncio of Central African Republic and Chad (2017-2022); Apostolic Nuncio of Trinidad and Tobago, Antigua and Barbuda, Belize, Grenada, Guyana, Saint Kitts and Nevis, Saint Vincent and Grenadines, Suriname, Bahamas, Barbados, Dominica, Jamaica and Saint Lucia (2022-2026); Apostolic Delegate to the Antilles (2022-2026)

Orders
- Ordination: 27 May 1989
- Consecration: 10 June 2017 by Paul Gallagher, Antonio Cañizares Llovera, and Carlos Osoro Sierra

Personal details
- Born: September 5, 1964 (age 61) Valencia, Spain

Styles of Santiago de Wit Guzmán
- Reference style: His Excellency; The Most Reverend
- Spoken style: Your Excellency
- Religious style: Archbishop

Santiago de Wit Gúzman (born 5 September 1964) is a Spanish prelate of the Catholic Church who works in the diplomatic service of the Holy See.

== Biography ==
He was born in the city of Valencia on 5 September 1964. He was ordained a priest for the Archdiocese of Valencia on 27 May 1989.

After his ordination, he obtained a bachelor's degree in theology from the Faculty of Theology San Vicente Ferrer of Valencia. He also earned a doctorate in Canon Law at the Pontifical University of St. Thomas Aquinas. He also studied at the Pontifical Ecclesiastical Academy from 1994 to 1998.

== Diplomatic career ==
He entered the diplomatic service of the Holy See on 13 June 1998. He worked in the Central African Republic and Chad until 2001, then in the Netherlands until 2004, and then in Paraguay until 2007. From 2007 to 2010 he was a counselor in the Apostolic Nunciature in Egypt, then in the Democratic Republic of the Congo until 2012, and then in his native Spain.

In 21 March 2017, Pope Francis appointed him titular archbishop of Gabala and apostolic nuncio to the Central African Republic. On 25 March he was named nuncio to Chad as well. He received his episcopal consecration on 10 June from Archbishop Paul Richard Gallagher.

On 30 July 2022, Pope Francis appointed him as apostolic nuncio to Trinidad and Tobago, Antigua and Barbuda, Belize, Grenada, Guyana, Saint Kitts and Nevis, Saint Vincent and the Grenadines, Suriname and apostolic delegate in the Antilles. On 12 November 2022, he was appointed nuncio to Bahamas, Barbados, Dominica, Jamaica and Saint Lucia as well.

On 25 May 2026, Pope Leo XIV appointed him as apostolic nuncio to the Netherlands.

== See also ==
- List of heads of the diplomatic missions of the Holy See
