= Apostolic Nunciature to Saint Vincent and the Grenadines =

Diplomatic mission of the Holy See in the Caribbean

The Apostolic Nunciature to Saint Vincent and the Grenadines is an ecclesiastical office of the Catholic Church in Saint Vincent and the Grenadines. It is a diplomatic post of the Holy See, whose representative is called the Apostolic Nuncio with the rank of an ambassador. The title Apostolic Nuncio to Saint Vincent and the Grenadines is held by the prelate appointed Apostolic Nuncio to Trinidad and Tobago; he resides in Trinidad and Tobago.

Pope John Paul II established the Nunciature to Saint Vincent and the Grenadines on 17 April 1990.

== List of papal representatives to Saint Vincent and the Grenadines ==
Apostolic Nuncios

- Eugenio Sbarbaro (7 February 1991 – 26 April 2000)
- Emil Paul Tscherrig (8 July 2000 – 22 May 2004)
- Thomas Edward Gullickson (2 October 2004 – 21 May 2011)
- Nicola Girasoli (29 October 2011 – 16 June 2017)
- Fortunatus Nwachukwu (4 November 2017 – 17 December 2021)
- Santiago de Wit Guzmán (30 July 2022 – 25 May 2026)

== See also ==
- Apostolic Delegation to the Antilles
