= Apostolic Nunciature to Belize =

Diplomatic post of the Holy See

The Apostolic Nunciature to Belize is an ecclesiastical office of the Catholic Church in Belize. It is a diplomatic post of the Holy See, whose representative is called the Apostolic Nuncio with the rank of an ambassador. The title Apostolic Nuncio to Belize is held by the prelate appointed Apostolic Nuncio to Trinidad and Tobago; he resides in Trinidad and Tobago.

== List of papal representatives to Belize ==
Apostolic Pro-Nuncios

- Paul Fouad Naïm Tabet (11 February 1984 – 8 September 1984)
- Manuel Monteiro de Castro (16 February 1985 – 21 August 1990)
- Eugenio Sbarbaro (7 February 1991 – 1998)

Apostolic Nuncios

- Giacinto Berloco (5 May 1998 – 24 February 2005)
- Luigi Pezzuto (7 May 2005 – 17 November 2012)
- Léon Kalenga Badikebele (13 April 2013 – 17 March 2018)
- Fortunatus Nwachukwu (8 September 2018 – 17 December 2021)
- Santiago de Wit Guzmán (30 July 2022 – 25 May 2026)

== See also ==
- Apostolic Delegation to the Antilles
