= Nicola Girasoli =

Italian prelate

His Excellency, The Most Reverend Nicola Girasoli
- Apostolic Nuncio to Slovakia
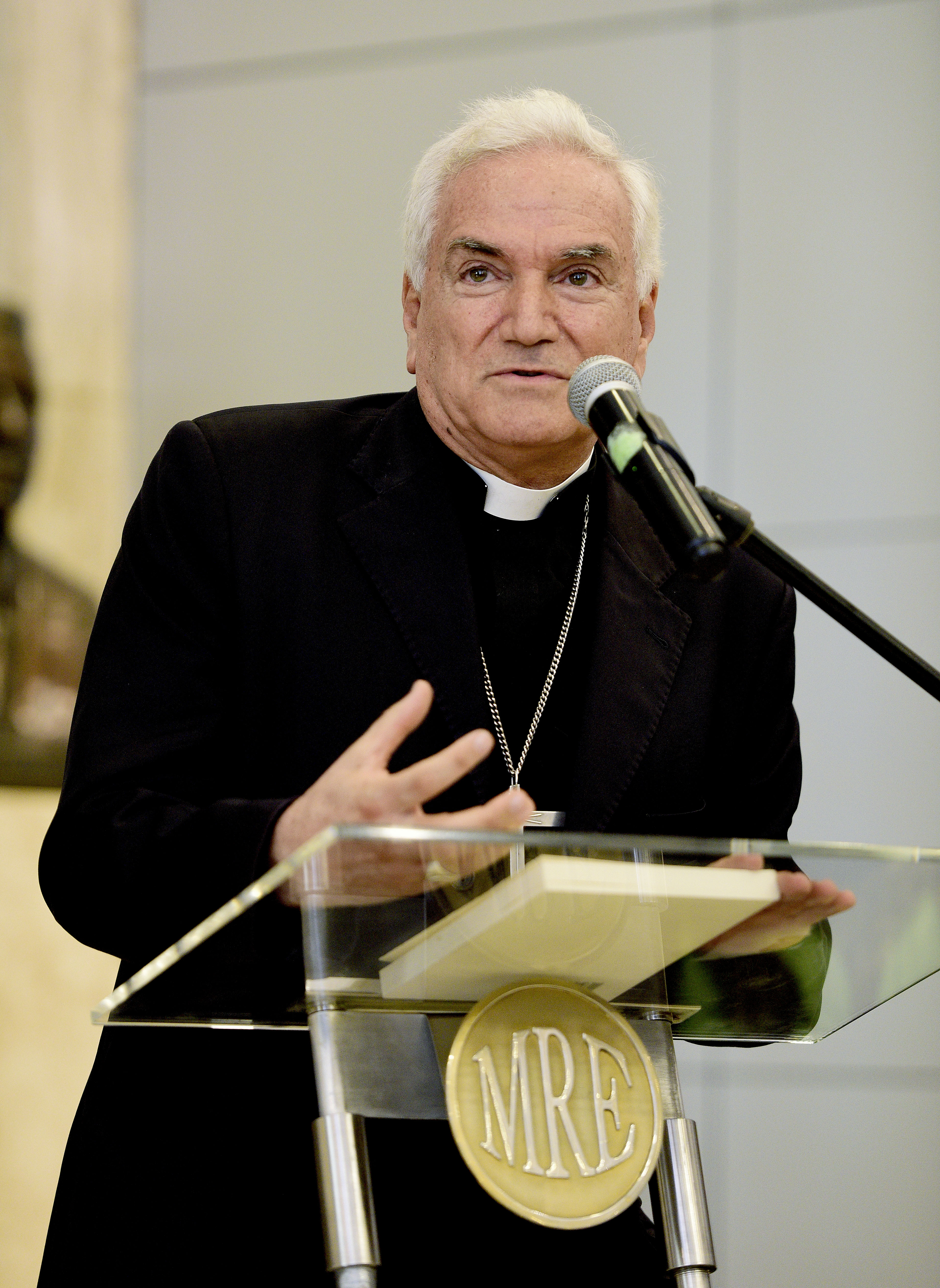
- Church: Roman Catholic Church
- Appointed: 2 July 2022
- Predecessor: Giacomo Guido Ottonello
- Other post: Titular Archbishop of Egnazia Appula
- Previous posts: Apostolic Nuncio to Peru (2017-2022); Apostolic Nuncio to Antigua and Barbuda, Bahamas, Barbados, Dominica, Grenada, Guyana, Jamaica, Saint Kitts and Nevis, Saint Lucia, Saint Vincent and the Grenadines, Suriname, Trinidad and Tobago (2011–17); Apostolic Nuncio to Zambia and Malawi (2006–11)

Orders
- Ordination: 15 June 1980 by Pope John Paul II
- Consecration: 11 March 2006 by Angelo Sodano

Personal details
- Born: Nicola Girasoli; 21 July 1957 (age 69) Ruvo di Puglia, Italy
- Education: Pontifical Ecclesiastical Academy
- Motto: Nuntiare cum jubilo
- Coat of arms

Styles of Nicola Girasol
- Reference style: His Excellency; The Most Reverend
- Spoken style: Your Excellency
- Religious style: Archbishop

Nicola Girasoli (21 July 1957) is a prelate of the Roman Catholic Church who has been Apostolic Nuncio to Slovakia since July 2022. He served as nuncio to Zambia and Malawi from 2006 until 2011 and nuncio to the Antilles and several other Caribbean nations from 2011 to 2017. From 2017 to 2022 he served as nuncio to Peru. He has been an archbishop since 2006.

== Life ==
Born in Ruvo di Puglia, Girasoli was ordained to the priesthood on 15 June 1980 by Pope John Paul II. He earned a doctorate in canon law. To prepare for a diplomatic career, he entered the Pontifical Ecclesiastical Academy in 1981.

He joined the diplomatic service of the Holy See on 1 May 1985. His assignments included postings in Indonesia, Australia, Hungary, Belgium, the United States, and Argentina, as well as work in the Section for General Affairs of the Vatican Secretariat of State.

On 24 January 2006, Pope Benedict XVI appointed him nuncio to Zambia and Malawi, and titular archbishop of Egnazia Appula. He received his episcopal consecration on 11 March from Cardinal Angelo Sodano, with Archbishop Robert Sarah and Bishop Luigi Martella as co-consecrators.

On 29 October 2011, he was appointed apostolic delegate to the Antilles, and nuncio to Antigua and Barbuda, Bahamas, Dominica, Jamaica, Grenada, Saint Kitts and Nevis, Saint Lucia, Saint Vincent and the Grenadines, Suriname and Guyana. On 21 December 2011, he also became nuncio to Trinidad and Tobago and Barbados.

On 16 June 2017, Pope Francis named him nuncio to Peru. In May 2018, he was mentioned as a possible candidate to fill the position of Substitute for General Affairs in the Secretariat of State because he was thought to be "very close to Pope Francis and agreeable to Cardinal Pietro Parolin", the Secretary of State.

On 2 July 2022, Pope Francis named him nuncio to Slovakia.

In addition to Italian, he speaks English, French, and Spanish. He devoted several years to studying the rights of minorities and has written on the subject.

=== Blessing of the Chapel in Kysuce region, Slovakia ===
On May 2, 2026, in Vychylovka, in his capacity as the Apostolic Nuncio, Mons. Girasoli blessed the historic Chapel of the Rosary of Our Lady on the occasion of the 45th anniversary of the opening of the open air Kysuce Village Museum. The event was attended by several ambassadors and diplomats accredited in the Slovak Republic. The new St. Hubert Arboretum was also opened on this occasion.

== Writings ==
- Bastarsi [It Is Enough] (in Italian). Piero Lacaita Editore. 1985.
- Significato ecclesiale dei beni temporali della Chiesa: studio dei documenti conciliari e del libro V del Codice di Diritto Canonico (in Italian). 1990. OCLC 65447147.
- Compromise and Minority Rights. Budapest: Akadémiai Kiadó. January 1996. ISBN 978-963-05-6866-1.
- National Minorities: Who Are They?. Budapest: Akadémiai Kiadó. September 1996. ISBN 978-963-05-7316-0.
- Il primo cielo: perchè Dante non pubblicò il Paradiso (in Italian). Società Editrice Internazionale. 1995. ISBN 978-88-05-05492-3.

== See also ==
- List of heads of the diplomatic missions of the Holy See
