= Catholic Church in Antigua and Barbuda =

The Catholic Church in Antigua and Barbuda is part of the worldwide Catholic Church in communion with the Bishop of Rome, the Pope.

== Territorial organization ==
The only ecclesiastical jurisdiction in this island state is the Diocese of Saint John's - Basseterre, suffragan of Archdiocese of Castries. The Catholic population is about 6,930 people out of a total of 100,000 inhabitants. The bishops of Antigua and Barbuda are part of the Antilles Episcopal Conference.

== Apostolic Nunciature ==
The Apostolic Nuncio of Antigua and Barbuda was established on December 15, 1986 with the Papal brief Ut publica et Ecclesiae of Pope John Paul II.

== Nuncios ==
Apostolic Pro-Nuncios

- Manuel Monteiro de Castro (16 February 1985 - 21 August 1990)

Apostolic Nuncios

- Eugenio Sbarbaro (7 February 1991 - 26 April 2000)
- Emil Paul Tscherrig (8 July 2000 - 22 May 2004)
- Thomas Edward Gullickson (2 October 2004 - 21 May 2011)
- Nicola Girasoli (21 December 2011 - 16 June 2017)
- Fortunatus Nwachukwu (4 November 2017 – 17 December 2021)
- Santiago de Wit Guzmán (30 July 2022 – 25 May 2026)

== See also ==
- Catholic Church by country
