= Paul Fouad Tabet =

Lebanese-born Catholic prelate

- Apostolic Nuncio to Greece
- Native name: باول فؤاد ثابت
- Church: Maronite Catholic Church
- In office: 2 January 1996 – 25 January 2005
- Predecessor: Luciano Storero
- Successor: Patrick Coveney
- Other post: Titular Archbishop of Sinna (1980-2009)
- Previous posts: Permanent Observer of the Holy See to the United Nations in Geneva (1991-1995); Apostolic Pro-Nuncio to Nigeria (1984-1991); Apostolic Pro-Nuncio to Belize (1984); Apostolic Pro-Nuncio to the Bahamas, Barbados, Jamaica & Trinidad and Tobago (1980-1984)

Orders
- Ordination: 22 December 1956
- Consecration: 30 March 1980 by Anthony Peter Khoraish

Personal details
- Born: 28 November 1929 Maarab, Mandatory Lebanese Republic
- Died: 20 July 2009 (aged 79)

Paul Fouad Tabet (28 November 1929 – 20 July 2009) was a Lebanese-born Catholic prelate of the Maronite Church, who spent many years in the diplomatic service of the Holy See. He became an archbishop in 1980 and from 1980 to 2005 served as apostolic nuncio to numerous states, including various nations of the Caribbean, Nigeria, and Greece.

== Life ==
Born in Maarab, Lebanon, on 28 November 1929, Tabet was ordained a priest of the Maronite Church on 22 December 1956.

In 1960, he was appointed to prepare for work in the diplomatic service of the Holy See by studies at Rome's Pontifical Ecclesiastical Academy.

From 1978 to 1980 he was a commissioner of the Roman Curia on the West Indies (Antilles). In this period, he was given the title of honorary prelate.

On 9 February 1980, Pope John Paul II appointed Tabet titular archbishop of Sinna and Apostolic Pro-Nuncio to Trinidad and Tobago, to Barbados, to Jamaica, and to the Bahamas, and Apostolic Delegate to the remainder of the Caribbean, to which the Holy See refers by the name of the Antilles. Tabet was consecrated bishop on 30 March 1980 by the Maronite Patriarch of Antioch, Cardinal Anthony Peter Khoraish, assisted by co-consecrators Chucrallah Harb, Eparch of Jounieh, and Roland Aboujaoudé, auxiliary bishop of Antioch. On 11 February 1984, Tabet's responsibilities were expanded with the additional appointment as Apostolic Pro-Nuncio to Belize.

On 8 September 1984, he was reassigned as Apostolic Pro-Nuncio to Nigeria.

On 14 December 1991, he was appointed the Permanent Observer of the Holy See to the United Nations in Geneva, a post he held until March 1995.

On 2 January 1996, Tabet was appointed Apostolic Nuncio to Greece. He remained in the post until 25 January 2005, date of his retirement from the Holy See's diplomatic service.

Tabet was member of the honorary committee of the Bios Prize Award of the United Nations High Commissioner for Refugees.

Archbishop Paul Fouad Tabet, apostolic nuncio, died on 20 July 2009.
