= Sergio Sebastiani =

Italian prelate of the Catholic Church (1931–2024)

His Eminence Sergio Sebastiani
- President Emeritus of the Prefecture for the Economic Affairs of the Holy See
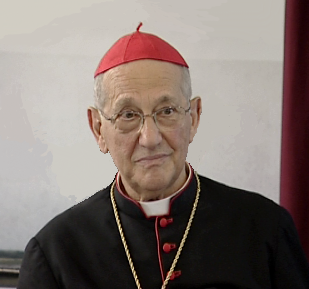
- Sebastiani in 2009
- Church: Roman Catholic Church
- Appointed: 3 November 1997
- Term ended: 12 April 2008
- Predecessor: Edmund Casimir Szoka
- Successor: Velasio De Paolis
- Other post: Cardinal-Priest of Sant'Eustachio "pro hac vice" (2001–2024) (Note: Cardinal-Deacon from 2001 to 2011; he became a Cardinal-Priest in 2011 but held this particular church since being named as a cardinal.)
- Previous posts: Apostolic Pro-Nuncio to Madagascar (1976–1985); Apostolic Pro-Nuncio to Mauritius (1976–1985); Titular Archbishop of Cesarea in Mauretania (1976–2001); Apostolic Nuncio to Turkey (1985–1994); Secretary General of the Committee for the Great Jubilee of 2000 (1994–1997); President of Peregrinatio ad Petri Sedem (1996–1997)

Orders
- Ordination: 15 July 1956 by Norberto Pirini
- Consecration: 30 October 1976 by Jean-Marie Villot
- Created cardinal: 21 February 2001 by Pope John Paul II
- Rank: Cardinal Deacon (2001–2011); Cardinal Priest (2011–2024)

Personal details
- Born: Sergio Sebastiani; 11 April 1931 Montemonaco, Italy
- Died: 16 January 2024 (aged 92) Rome, Italy
- Education: Pontifical Gregorian University; Pontifical Lateran University; Pontifical Ecclesiastical Academy
- Coat of arms

Styles of Sergio Sebastiani
- Reference style: His Eminence
- Spoken style: Your Eminence
- Informal style: Cardinal
- See: Caesarea in Mauretania (titular)

Sergio Sebastiani (11 April 1931 – 16 January 2024) was an Italian prelate of the Catholic Church who was head of the Prefecture for the Economic Affairs of the Holy See from 1997 to 2008. He was made a cardinal in 2001. From 1960 to 1994 he worked in the diplomatic service of the Holy See, becoming an archbishop and apostolic nuncio in 1976 and leading the offices representing the Vatican in Madagascar, Mauritius, and Turkey.

== Biography ==
Sergio Sebastiani was born in Montemonaco, Italy. He studied at the Episcopal Seminary of Ascoli Piceno and later at the Archiepiscopal Seminary of Fermo. He continued his studies at the Pontifical Gregorian University in Rome where he earned his licentiate in theology and at the Pontifical Lateran University where he was awarded a doctorate in canon law. He was ordained on 15 July 1956 in Fermo. After this, he studied in Rome until 1960.

Sebastiani served as secretary of nunciature in Perú, 1960–1962; in nunciature in Brazil 1962–1966; auditor in nunciature in Chile, 1966–1967. He was recalled to the Vatican as secretary of Cardinal Cicognani and subsequently Cardinal Villot during their terms as secretaries of State, and later head of the secretariat of the Sostituto, 1967–1974. The decision was taken to appoint him to the rank of Counselor of nunciature in France with special charge before the Council of Europe, 1974–1976. He was created Prelate of honour on 30 April 1974.

On 27 September 1976, Pope Paul VI appointed him Titular Archbishop of Caesarea in Mauretania and Apostolic Pro-Nuncio to Madagascar. He added Apostolic Pro-Nuncio to Mauritius on 24 November. Sebastiani became Apostolic Pro-Nuncio to Turkey on 8 January 1985. In 1994, he was appointed General Secretary of the Central Committee for the Great Jubilee of the Year 2000. From 2 May 1996 to 3 November 1997, he was president of Peregrinatio ad Petri Sedem, the Vatican agency that promotes and supports pilgrims on their visits to Rome.

In 1997, Sebastiani was made President of the Prefecture for the Economic Affairs of the Holy See, part of the Roman Curia, responsible for auditing the temporal possessions of the Holy See. He served in this position until his resignation on 12 April 2008. Pope Benedict XVI named Velasio De Paolis as Sebastiani's successor.

Sebastiani was created Cardinal-Deacon of S. Eustachio on 21 February 2001, and was one of the cardinal electors who participated in the 2005 papal conclave that selected Pope Benedict XVI. On 21 February 2011, he opted for the order of Cardinal Priest, with his former diaconal church elevated to the level of cardinalitial title.

Sebastiani was the spiritual guide and protector of an organisation that styles itself the Sovereign Hospitaller Order of Saint John of Jerusalem, Knights of Malta, one of many private organizations mimicking the Sovereign Military Order of Malta.

Sebastiani died on 16 January 2024, at the age of 92.

== Notes ==
Diplomatic posts
| Preceded by Michele Cecchini | Apostolic Pro-Nuncio to Madagascar; 27 September 1976 – 8 January 1985 | Succeeded by Agostino Marchetto |
| Preceded by Michele Cecchini | Apostolic Pro-Nuncio to Mauritius; 27 September 1976 – 8 January 1985 | Succeeded by Agostino Marchetto |
| Preceded by Salvatore Asta | Apostolic Nuncio to Turkey; 8 January 1985 – 16 November 1994 | Succeeded by Pier Luigi Celata |
Catholic Church titles
| Preceded by Giuseppe Moizo | — TITULAR — Titular Archbishop of Cesarea in Mauretania; 27 September 1976 – 21 February 2001 | Succeeded by Gerard Johannes Nicolaas de Korte |
| Preceded by Camillo Ruini | President of the Peregrinatio ad Petri Sedem; 2 May 1996 – 3 November 1997 | Succeeded by Crescenzio Sepe |
| Preceded by Edmund Szoka | President of the Prefecture for the Economic Affairs of the Holy See; 3 November 1997 – 12 April 2008 | Succeeded by Velasio De Paolis |
| Preceded by Guido del Mestri | Cardinal Deacon of San Eustachio; 21 February 2001 – 21 February 2011 | Himself as Cardinal Priest |
| Himself as Cardinal Deacon | Cardinal Priest 'pro hac vice' of San Eustachio; 21 February 2011 – 16 January 2024 | Vacant |
