= Eugene Nugent =

Irish Catholic prelate (born 1959)

His Excellency, The Most Reverend Eugene Nugent DCL
- Apostolic Nuncio to the Czech Republic; Titular Archbishop of Domnach Sechnaill
- Church: Catholic
- Appointed: 25 May 2026
- Predecessor: Thaddeus Okolo
- Previous posts: Apostolic Nuncio to Bahrain, Kuwait and Qatar (2021-2026); Apostolic Nuncio to Haiti (2015-2021); Apostolic Nuncio to Madagascar, Mauritius and Seychelles, and Apostolic Delegate to Comoros and Réunion (2010-2015); Head of the Holy See Study Mission to Hong Kong (2001-2010)

Orders
- Ordination: 9 July 1983 by Michael Harty
- Consecration: 18 March 2010 by Tarcisio Bertone

Personal details
- Born: 21 October 1958 (age 68) Gurtaderra, Scariff, County Clare, Ireland
- Education: Pontifical Gregorian University; St Patrick's College, Maynooth
- Motto: Quodcumque dixerit vobis, facite (Latin for 'Do whatever he says')

Ordination history
History
Priestly ordination
- Ordained by: Michael Harty
Episcopal consecration
- Principal consecrator: Tarcisio Bertone
- Co-consecrators: Pier Giorgio Micchiardi; Nestorius Timanywa
Episcopal succession
Bishops consecrated by Eugene Nugent as principal consecrator
- Charles Peters Barthélus: 5 September 2020
- Styles
- Reference style: The Most Reverend
- Spoken style: Your Excellency
- Religious style: Archbishop

Eugene Martin Nugent (born 21 October 1958) is an Irish Roman Catholic prelate who has served as Apostolic Nuncio to Bahrain, Kuwait and Qatar since January 2021. On 25 May 2026 he was named Apostolic Nuncio to the Czech Republic.

== Early life and education ==
Nugent was born in Gurtaderra, Scariff, County Clare on 21 October 1958.

He attended primary school at Clonusker National School and secondary school at Scariff Community College. Nugent studied for the priesthood at St Patrick's College, Maynooth, where he was awarded a Bachelor of Arts in Celtic studies from the National University of Ireland, and the Pontifical Irish College, Rome, where he was awarded a baccalaureate in theology from the Pontifical Gregorian University.

Nugent was ordained a priest for the Diocese of Killaloe on 9 July 1983.

== Presbyteral ministry ==
Following ordination, Nugent completed a licentiate in canon law at the Pontifical Gregorian University, before returning to the Diocese of Killaloe in 1984, where he received his first pastoral assignment as curate in the cathedral parish in Ennis until 1987.

Nugent returned to Rome in 1988, where he worked in the Section for General Affairs of the Secretariat of State, before entering the Pontifical Ecclesiastical Academy in 1991, in preparation for a diplomatic career for the Holy See. He was awarded a doctorate in canon law from the Pontifical Gregorian University in 1992.

== Diplomatic career ==
Upon completion of studies at the Pontifical Ecclesiastical Academy, Nugent entered the diplomatic service of the Holy See on 1 July 1992, with his first diplomatic appointment as secretary to the Apostolic Nunciature to Turkey, Israel and Palestine. He was subsequently appointed to the Apostolic Nunciature to the Philippines in 2000, but while he was officially assigned to the apostolic nunciature in Manila, he resided in Hong Kong, from where he led the Holy See Study Mission. During his mission, Nugent handled relations between Catholic communities in China and the Holy See, however his effectiveness in doing so was compromised by the refusal of the Beijing government to allow him to travel regularly to mainland China, resulting in relations often being maintained in secret. (Note: His decade in Hong Kong was not mentioned in the biography published by the Holy See Press Office when it announced his appointment as archbishop and nuncio in 2010.)

=== Apostolic Nuncio to Madagascar, Mauritius and Seychelles ===
Nugent was appointed Apostolic Nuncio to Madagascar, Apostolic Delegate to Comoros and Réunion and titular archbishop of Domnach Sechnaill by Pope Benedict XVI on 13 February 2010. He was also appointed Apostolic Nuncio to Mauritius and Seychelles on 13 March.

Nugent was consecrated by the Cardinal Secretary of State, Tarcisio Bertone, on 18 March in St Peter's Basilica, Rome.

=== Apostolic Nuncio to Haiti ===
Nugent was appointed Apostolic Nuncio to Haiti by Pope Francis on 10 January 2015. He championed many causes during his mission, including the reconstruction of churches following the 2010 earthquake to facilitating political dialogue in order to end the political crisis in the country.

=== Apostolic Nuncio to Bahrain, Kuwait and Qatar ===
Nugent was appointed Apostolic Nuncio to Kuwait and Qatar by Pope Francis on 7 January 2021. He was also appointed Apostolic Nuncio to Bahrain on 11 February 2021.

=== Apostolic Nuncio to the Czech Republic ===
On 25 May 2026 he was appointed by Pope Leo XIV Apostolic Nuncio to the Czech Republic.

== See also ==
- List of heads of the diplomatic missions of the Holy See

Catholic Church titles
Preceded by Fernando Filoni	Head of the Holy See Study Mission in Hong Kong; 17 January 2001 – 13 February 2010	Succeeded by Ante Jozić
Diplomatic posts
Preceded by Mario Giordana	Apostolic Nuncio to Madagascar; 13 February 2010 – 10 January 2015	Succeeded by Paolo Rocco Gualtieri
Preceded by Bernardito Auza	Apostolic Nuncio to Haiti; 10 January 2015 – 7 January 2021	Vacant
Preceded by Francisco Montecillo Padilla	Apostolic Nuncio to Kuwait since 7 January 2021	Incumbent
Preceded by Francisco Montecillo Padilla	Apostolic Nuncio to Qatar since 7 January 2021	Incumbent
Preceded by Francisco Montecillo Padilla	Apostolic Nuncio to Bahrain since 11 February 2021	Incumbent
