= Holy See–Mauritius relations =

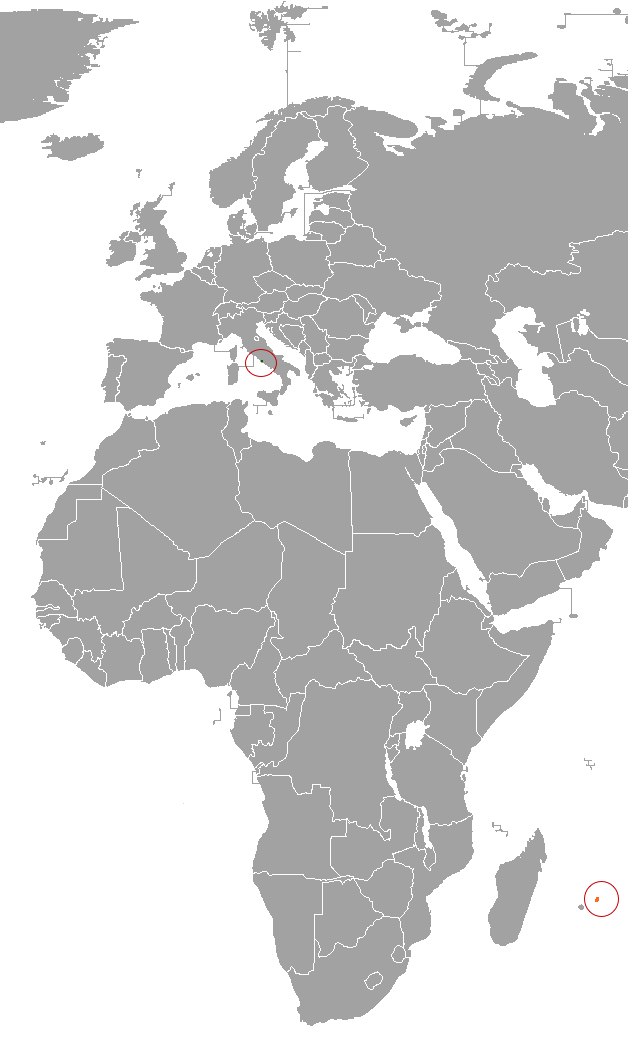
- Holy See: Mauritius

Diplomatic mission
- Apostolic Nunciature to Mauritius: Embassy of Mauritius to the Holy See

Envoy
- Apostolic Nuncio: Ambassador

Holy See–Mauritius relations are the diplomatic relations between Mauritius and the Holy See, which is sovereign over the Vatican. The Holy See has an Apostolic Nunciature to Mauritius, while Mauritius has an embassy accredited to the Holy See, located in London.

== History ==
Soon after Mauritius gained independence from the United Kingdom in 1968, Archbishop Michele Cecchini was appointed as the first Apostolic Pro-Nuncio to Mauritius on 1 March 1969 and diplomatic relations between Mauritius and the Holy See were established on 9 June 1970.

== Papal visits ==
There have been two papal visits to Mauritius: that of St. John Paul II in October 1989, and Pope Francis in September 2019.
