= Ermenegildo Pellegrinetti =

Italian Roman Catholic cardinal

His Eminence Ermenegildo Pellegrinetti
- Cardinal-Priest of San Lorenzo in Panisperna
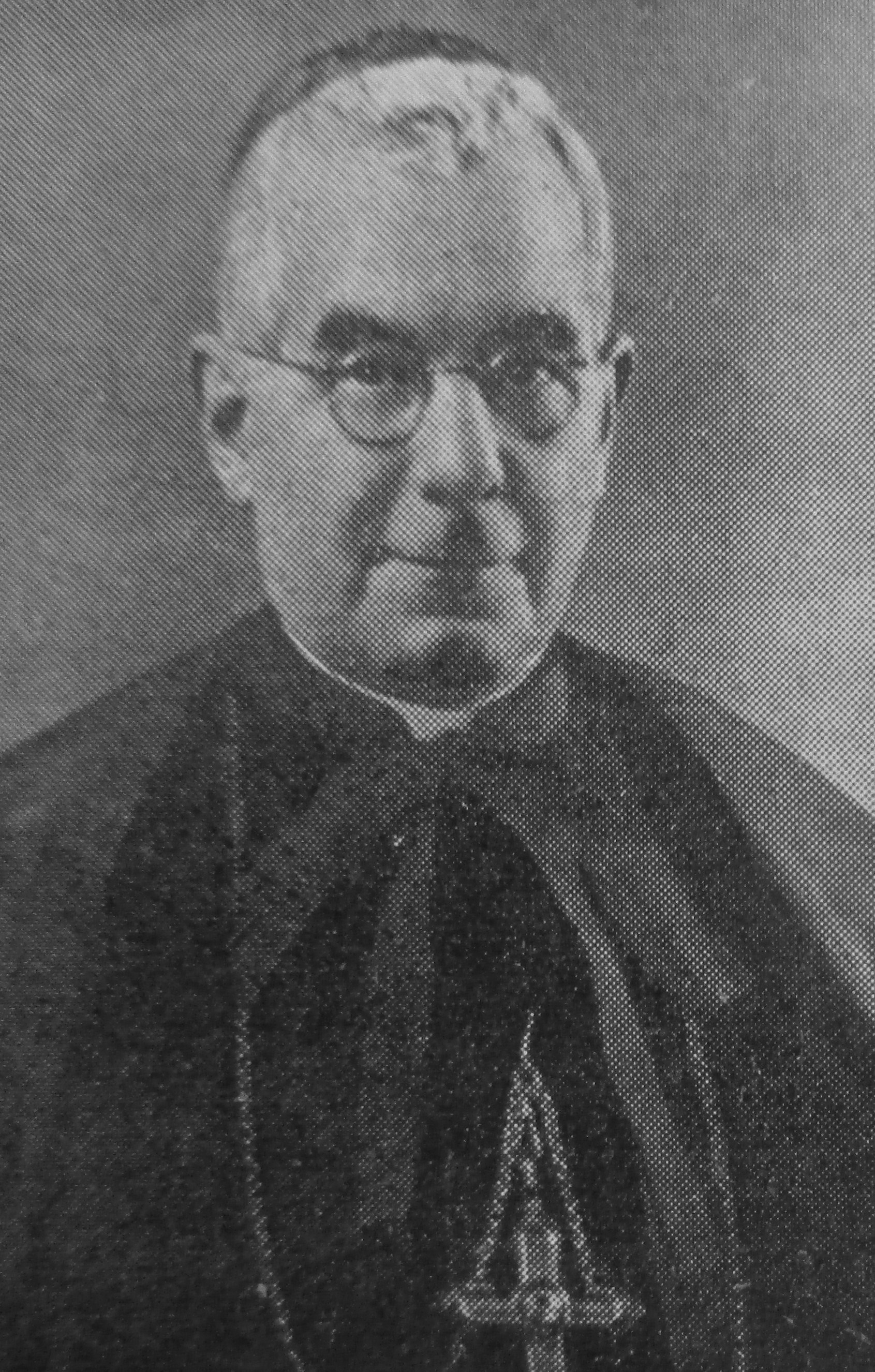
- The cardinal c. 1939.
- Church: Roman Catholic Church
- Appointed: 16 December 1937
- Term ended: 29 March 1943
- Predecessor: Eustaquio Ilundáin y Esteban
- Successor: Antonio Caggiano
- Previous posts: Apostolic Nuncio to Yugoslavia (1922-37); Titular Archbishop of Adana (1922-37)

Orders
- Ordination: 24 September 1898
- Consecration: 18 June 1922 by Pietro Gasparri
- Created cardinal: 13 December 1937 by Pope Pius XI
- Rank: Cardinal-Priest

Personal details
- Born: Ermenegildo Pellegrinetti; 27 March 1876 Camaiore, Kingdom of Italy
- Died: 29 March 1943 (aged 67) Rome, Kingdom of Italy
- Education: Pontifical University of Saint Thomas Aquinas; Pontifical Roman Athenaeum Saint Apollinare
- Motto: Fide tutior

Styles of Ermenegildo Pellegrinetti
- Reference style: His Eminence
- Spoken style: Your Eminence
- Informal style: Cardinal
- See: none

Ermenegildo Pellegrinetti (27 March 1876 – 29 March 1943) was an Italian cardinal of the Roman Catholic Church who served as nuncio to Yugoslavia from 1922 to 1937, and was made a cardinal in 1937.

== Biography ==
Ermenegildo Pellegrinetti was born in Camaiore, and studied at the seminary in Lucca before going to Rome to study at the Pontifical Academy of Saint Thomas Aquinas, Pontifical Roman Athenaeum "S. Apollinare", and Vatican School of Paleography and Diplomatics.

He was ordained to the priesthood on 24 September 1898, and then did pastoral work in Lucca and taught at its seminary until 1917. Pellegrinetti served as a military chaplain during World War I, from 1917 to 1918, after which he was named secretary of the nunciature to Poland. From 1919 to 1922, he was auditor of the same nunciature. He was raised to the rank of a Privy Chamberlain of His Holiness on 29 July 1919, and a Domestic Prelate of His Holiness on 22 February 1922.

On 24 May 1922, Pellegrinetti was appointed Titular Archbishop of Adana by Pope Pius XI, and Nuncio to Yugoslavia a week later, on 29 May. He received his episcopal consecration on the following 18 June from Cardinal Pietro Gasparri, with Archbishops Giovanni Maria Zonghi and Giovanni Volpi serving as co-consecrators, at the church of Santa Maria in Campitelli. Pellegrinetti served as the papal legate to the National Eucharistic Congress in Zagreb on 30 July 1930. He also negotiated a concordat between Yugoslavia and the Vatican that the Yugoslav parliament did not ratify following riots that protested its indulgent stance towards Catholicism.

Pope Pius made him Cardinal Priest of San Lorenzo in Panisperna in the consistory of 16 December 1937. Pellegrinetti was one of the cardinal electors who participated in the 1939 papal conclave, which selected Pope Pius XII.

He died in Rome at age 67. He is buried in the collegiate church of his native Camaiore.

Catholic Church titles
Preceded by Francesco Cherubini	Nuncio to Yugoslavia; 1922–1937	Succeeded by Ettore Felici
