= Peregrinatio =

Peregrinatio means leaving one's homeland and wandering for the love of God. It can refer to:

- the Peregrinatio ad Petri Sedem, a papal institution for assistance to pilgrims to Rome and certain other pious sites and events

It occurs as or in the title of several notable texts:

- a Peregrinatio describing the liturgy practised at Jerusalem, dating probably from the 4th century
- Peregrinatio in terram sanctam, an incunabulum by the Dutch author Erhard Reuwich
- Peregrinatio Etheriae or Peregrinatio Silviae, another account of a pilgrimage to the Holy Land by Egeria (pilgrim)
- Peregrinatio Scholastica, or Learning's Pilgrimage, written by the English dramatist John Day (dramatist)
