= Marchetto =

Marchetto may refer to:

== Given name ==
- Marchetto Cara (c. 1470 – probably 1525) was an Italian composer, lutenist and singer of the Renaissance.
- Marchetto da Padova (Marchettus of Padua; b. 1274?; fl. 1305 – 1319) was an Italian music theorist and composer of the late medieval era.

== Family name ==
- Agostino Marchetto (born 1940), Italian archbishop, diplomat, and historian
- Ennio Marchetto (born 1960), an Italian comedic live entertainer
- Maurizio Marchetto (born 1956), Italian ice speed skater, Olympic athlete
