= Mario Cagna =

Italian prelate (1911–1986)

- Apostolic Nuncio to Austria
- Church: Catholic Church
- In office: 11 May 1976 – November 1984
- Predecessor: Opilio Rossi
- Successor: Michele Cecchini
- Other post: Titular Archbishop of Heraclea in Europa (1962-1986)
- Previous posts: Apostolic Pro-Nuncio to Yugoslavia (1970-1976); Apostolic Delegate to Yugoslavia (1966-1970); Apostolic Internuncio to Japan (1962-1966)

Orders
- Ordination: 22 July 1934
- Consecration: 18 November 1962 by Amleto Giovanni Cicognani

Personal details
- Born: 8 October 1911 Lu Monferrato, Province of Alessandria, Kingdom of Italy
- Died: 4 April 1986 (aged 74)

Mario Cagna (8 October 1911 – 4 April 1986) was an Italian prelate of the Catholic Church who devoted his entire career to the Roman Curia and the diplomatic service of the Holy See. He became an archbishop in 1962 and served as an Apostolic Nuncio from 1962 until his death.

== Biography ==
Mario Cagna was born on 8 October 1911 in Lu Monferrato, Italy. He was ordained a priest of the Diocese of Casale Monferrato on 22 July 1934.

He joined the diplomatic service in 1937. He served briefly in the Netherlands and then in the Roman Curia in the Congregation for the Discipline of the Sacraments. He returned to the diplomatic service for postings in Peru from 1946 to 1949 and then in the Nunciature to Italy, an unimportant office overshadowed in Italy by the Holy See itself, from 1949 to 1962.

On 13 October 1962, Pope John XXIII named him titular archbishop of Heraclea in Europa and Apostolic Internuncio to Japan. He received his episcopal consecration on 18 November 1962 from Cardinal Amleto Cicognani.

On 3 September 1966, Pope Paul VI named him Apostolic Delegate to Yugoslavia. His title changed to Pro-Nuncio to Yugoslavia on 22 August 1970; he was the first nuncio in Europe in the postwar period and an agent of the Holy See's policy of rapprochement.

On 11 May 1976, Pope Paul VI appointed him Apostolic Nuncio to Austria. His career ended with the appointment of his successor, Michele Cecchini, on 4 December 1984. His final report on the state of the Church in Austria was "a catalogue of woes" ranging from the secularizing trends in society at large to heterodoxy in the seminaries and a too assertive laity.

He died on 4 April 1986.
