= Apostolic Nunciature to Czechoslovakia =

Former diplomatic post of the Holy See (1920–1993)

The Apostolic Nuncio to Czechoslovakia was an ecclesiastical office of the Roman Catholic Church, established in 1920 and lasting, with significant interruptions, until 1993. It was a diplomatic post of the Holy See, whose representative is called the Apostolic Nuncio with the rank of an ambassador. The office of the nunciature was located in Prague.

== History ==
The relationship between the Holy See and the government of Czechoslovakia was strained more often than not.

The new Czechoslovak government demanded that the majority of incumbent bishops be replaced and systematically implemented a persecutory anti-church policy. Due to this imposition, Pavel Huyn, Primate and Archbishop of Prague, Cardinal Lev Skrbenský z Hříště, Archbishop of Olomouc, and at least other six bishops had been replaced or forced out to resign. After 1921 only two pre-war bishops were allowed to remain.Bratislava remained from 1922 to 1977 in a "legal limbo" (a territory under its own apostolic administrator seated in Trnava but formally belonging to the Hungarian Archdiocese of Esztergom) because the government hindered the erection of any new religious structure.

In the 1920s, Apostolic Nuncio Francesco Marmaggi left Prague to protest public celebrations of the Czech national hero Jan Hus, a heretic in the eyes of the Church, but the underlying problem was that hundreds of Catholic places of worship had been seized by the government and assigned to the new Czechoslovak Hussite Church with an openly anti-Catholic purpose. Years of negotiations established a new working relationship, but the Vatican failed to persuade the Czechs to allow Marmaggi to return as nuncio, not even a face-saving few weeks. The Slovak independence and the creation in March 1939 of the Protectorate of Bohemia and Moravia, a few months before the outbreak of World War II, ended normal relations, and the Holy See sought a diplomatic middle ground by granting recognition to the Slovak Republic, a Nazi client state, but sent a chargé d'affaires, Giuseppe Burzio, rather than a nuncio.

Relations were restored only briefly after the war before the new Czechoslovak Communist government expelled the nuncio and terminated diplomatic relations. Finally, with the fall of the Soviet Union, the parties renewed their old ties, but in less than three years Czechoslovakia divided into the Czech Republic and Slovakia, and the Apostolic Nuncio to Czechoslovakia became nuncio to both of those new nations for a short period before the creation of an apostolic nunciature in Bratislava in 1994.

== List of papal representatives to Czechoslovakia ==
Apostolic nuncios

- Clemente Micara (15 May 1920 - 30 May 1923)
- Francesco Marmaggi (30 May 1923 - 13 February 1928) (Note: To protest the celebration of Jan Hus, he left Prague on 6 July 1925. The Vatican and Czech officials reached a temporary agreement in January 1928, but the Vatican was unable to persuade the Czech government to allow Marmaggi to return as nuncio, not even for a matter of weeks.)
- Pietro Ciriaci (15 February 1928 (Note: Šmíd dates his appointment to 18 March 1928, the day he was consecrated a bishop.) - 9 January 1934) (Note: Ciriaci was recalled to Rome in October 1933 at the insistence of the government, which accused of him of interfering in internal affairs by expressing sympathy for Slovak autonomy.)
- Saverio Ritter (5 August 1935 - 1939; 11 May 1946 - March 1949) (Note: Ritter's functions ended with the dissolution of the Czechoslovak state under Nazi pressure in the spring of 1939. He returned in Prague in 1946 but expelled in March 1949.)
- Giovanni Coppa (30 June 1990 – 1 January 1993)

== See also ==
- Ottavio De Liva, nunciature secretary expelled in 1950
- Apostolic Nunciature to the Czech Republic
- Apostolic Nunciature to Slovakia
- List of diplomatic missions of the Holy See
- Foreign relations of the Holy See
