= Bruno Musarò =

Italian prelate of the Catholic Church (1948–2026)

The Most Reverend Bruno Musarò
- Apostolic Nuncio to Costa Rica
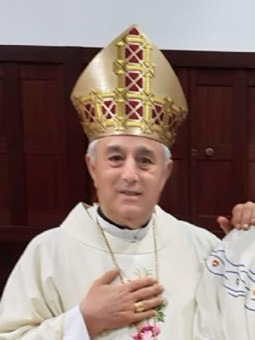
- Musarò in 2019
- Appointed: 29 August 2019
- Retired: 11 July 2023
- Predecessor: Antonio Arcari
- Other posts: Titular Archbishop of Abari (1994–2026), Titular Archbishop of Castro di Puglia (2026)
- Previous posts: Apostolic Nuncio to Egypt and Apostolic Delegate to the Arab League (2015–2019); Apostolic Nuncio to Cuba (2011–2015); Apostolic Nuncio to Peru (2009–2011); Apostolic Nuncio to Guatemala (2004–2009); Apostolic Nuncio to Madagascar, Mauritius, Seychelles and Apostolic Delegate to Comoros (1999–2004); Apostolic Nuncio to Panama (1994–1999)

Orders
- Ordination: 19 September 1971
- Consecration: 6 January 1995 by John Paul II, Giovanni Battista Re, and Jorge María Mejía

Personal details
- Born: 27 June 1948 Andrano, Italy
- Died: 26 September 2026 (aged 78) Tricase, Italy

Styles of Bruno Musarò
- Reference style: His Excellency; The Most Reverend
- Spoken style: Your Excellency
- Religious style: Archbishop

Bruno Musarò (27 June 1948 – 26 September 2026) was an Italian prelate of the Catholic Church who worked in the diplomatic service of the Holy See from 1977 to 2023, with the rank of archbishop and apostolic nuncio from 1994. In retirement, as is customary, he retained the title "Apostolic Nuncio".

== Early life and ordination ==
Born in Andrano on 27 June 1948, Bruno Musarò was ordained a priest on 19 September 1971. He entered the diplomatic service of the Holy See in 1977 and served in Korea, Italy, the Republic of Central Africa, Panama, Bangladesh, and Spain.

== Diplomatic career ==
On 3 December 1994, Pope John Paul II named him apostolic nuncio to Panama and Titular Archbishop of Abari. He received his episcopal consecration on 6 January 1995. On 25 September 1999 John Paul appointed him Apostolic Nuncio to Madagascar, Seychelles and Mauritius and Apostolic Delegate to Comoros and Réunion. On 10 February 2004 he was appointed the Nuncio to Guatemala On 5 January 2009, Pope Benedict XVI named him the Apostolic Nuncio to Peru, and on 6 August 2011 the Apostolic Nuncio to Cuba.

In September 2014, Musaro spoke openly about Cuba's "extreme poverty and human and civil degradation". Musaro made his remarks while on vacation in Italy. The Cuban people are "victims of a socialist dictatorship that has kept them subjugated for the past 56 years", Musaro said. "I’m thankful to the pope for inviting me to this island, and I hope to leave once that the socialist regime has disappeared indefinitely.... Only liberty can bring hope to the Cuban people."

On 2 February 2015, he was appointed Apostolic Nuncio to Egypt and delegate to the Arab League.

Pope Francis named him Apostolic Nuncio to Costa Rica on 29 August 2019.

On 11 July 2023, Pope Francis accepted his resignation upon reaching the age of 75.

On 6 January 2026 he was transferred from the titular see of Abari, and became a Titular Archbishop of Castro di Puglia.

== Death ==
Musarò died on 26 September 2026 at the age of 78.

== See also ==
- List of heads of the diplomatic missions of the Holy See
