= Apostolic Nunciature to Yugoslavia =

Former office of the Catholic Church

The Apostolic Nunciature to Yugoslavia was an ecclesiastical office of the Catholic Church in Yugoslavia. It was a diplomatic post of the Holy See, whose representative is called the Apostolic Nuncio with the rank of an ambassador.

The Kingdom of Serbs, Croats and Slovenes was created in the aftermath of the First World War; its name was changed to Yugoslavia in 1929. The Nunciature to Yugoslavia was created in 1921 and ended with the overthrow of the Yugoslav monarchy and the creation of a Communist government at the end of World War II. Following the dissolution of the Soviet Union and the Warsaw Pact, Yugoslavia and the Holy See reestablished relations in 1976. As Yugoslavia subdivided into a group of successor states, each with its own diplomatic relations with the Holy See, the responsibilities of the Nunciature to Yugoslavia shrank until the last Apostolic Nuncio to Yugoslavia was appointed in 2000 when the nunciature in Belgrade was located in the Federation of Montenegro and Serbia, which then dissolved in 2006, transforming the nunciature in Belgrade into the Apostolic Nunciature to Serbia.

== List of papal representatives to Yugoslavia ==
Apostolic Nuncios to Yugoslavia

- Francesco Cherubini (2 March 1920 (Note: He was appointed Apostolic Nuncio to the Kingdom of the Serbs, Croats, and Slovenes.) – 15 February 1921)
- Ermenegildo Pellegrinetti (29 May 1922 (Note: He was appointed Apostolic Nuncio to the Kingdom of the Serbs, Croats, and Slovenes.) – 13 December 1937) (Note: His term as nuncio ended when he became a cardinal.)
- Ettore Felici (21 April 1938 (Note: He was appointed Apostolic Nuncio to Yugoslavia.) – 15 January 1946)
  - Felici spent much of the Second World War working at the Secretariat of State in Rome; the establishment of the Socialist Federal Republic of Yugoslavia in 1945 ended the relationship between the Holy See and the Kingdom of Yugoslavia.

Apostolic Delegates to Yugoslavia

- Mario Cagna (3 September 1966 – 11 May 1976)
  - His title changed to Pro-Nuncio to Yugoslavia on 22 August 1970.

Apostolic Pro-Nuncios to Yugoslavia

- Michele Cecchini (18 June 1976 – 4 December 1984)
- Francesco Colasuonno (8 January 1985 – 19 April 1986)
- Gabriel Montalvo Higuera (12 June 1986 – 17 April 1993) (Note: He was named Apostolic Nuncio to Belarus on 17 April 1993. He was named president of the Pontifical Ecclesiastical Academy on 29 April 1993. The Acta Apostolicae Sedis, the Vatican's record of official actions, identifies Montalvo as President of the Academy without reference to any diplomatic assignment as of 28 May 1994.)

Apostolic Nuncios to Yugoslavia

- Santos Abril y Castelló (24 February 1996 – 4 March 2000)
- Eugenio Sbarbaro (26 April 2000 – 8 August 2009)
  - By 2007, the Nunciature to Yugoslavia in concert with the restructuring of that nation became the Apostolic Nunciature to Serbia.
