= Apostolic Nunciature to Slovakia =

Diplomatic mission of the Holy See in Europe

The Apostolic Nunciature to Slovakia is an ecclesiastical office of the Catholic Church in Slovakia. It is a diplomatic post of the Holy See, whose representative is called the Apostolic Nuncio with the rank of an ambassador.

== Holy See-Slovakia relations ==
Relations between the Holy See and what is now Slovakia began in 1919 with the dissolution of the Austro-Hungarian Empire but the relationship between the Holy See and the government of Czechoslovakia was strained more often than not. The new Czechoslovak government demanded that the incumbent bishops in Slovakia be replaced and systematically implemented a persecutory anti-church policy. Due to this imposition in 1920 all bishops but one had been replaced or forced out to resign.

The proclamation of Slovak independence in March 1939, a few months before the outbreak of World War II, ended normal relations between the Vatican and Czechoslovakia, and the Holy See sought a diplomatic middle ground by granting recognition to the Slovak Republic, but sent a chargé d'affaires, Giuseppe Burzio, rather than a nuncio.

== Apostolic Nuncios to Slovakia ==
Archbishop Giovanni Coppa was named Apostolic Nuncio to Czechoslovakia on 30 June 1990. With the division on that country into Slovakia and the Czech Republic on 1 January 1993, Coppa became nuncio to each of them, based in Prague.

- Giovanni Coppa (1 January 1993 – 2 March 1994)
- Luigi Dossena (2 March 1994 – 8 February 2001)
- Henryk Józef Nowacki 8 February 2001 – 28 November 2007)
- Mario Giordana (15 March 2008 – 1 April 2017)
- Giacomo Guido Ottonello (1 April 2017 – 31 October 2021)
- Nicola Girasoli (2 July 2022 – present)

== See also ==
- Catholic Church in Slovakia
- Apostolic Nunciature to the Czech Republic
- Apostolic Nunciature to Czechoslovakia
- Foreign relations of the Holy See
- List of diplomatic missions of the Holy See
- Giuseppe Burzio, chargé d'affaires in Slovakia 1940-45
