= Tomasz Grysa =

Polish Archbishop of the Catholic Church

His Excellency, The Most Reverend Tomasz Grysa
- Apostolic Nuncio of Uganda; Titular Archbishop of Rubicon
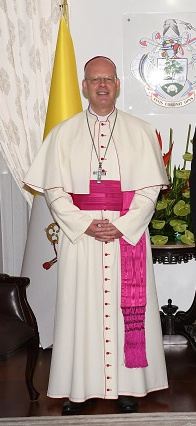
- Grysa in 2023
- Appointed: 14 May 2026
- Predecessor: Luigi Bianco
- Other post: Titular Archbishop of Rubicon
- Previous post: Apostolic Nuncio to Madagascar, Mauritius, Seychelles and Apostolic Delegate to Comoros (2022-2026)

Orders
- Ordination: 25 May 1995 by Jerzy Stroba
- Consecration: 1 November 2022 by Pietro Parolin, Stanisław Gądecki, and Marek Jędraszewski

Personal details
- Born: 16 October 1970 (age 56) Poznań, Poland
- Motto: Adoro te devote
- Coat of arms

Styles of Tomasz Grysa
- Reference style: His Excellency; The Most Reverend
- Spoken style: Your Excellency
- Religious style: Archbishop

Tomasz Grysa (born 16 October 1970) is a Polish prelate of the Catholic Church who works in the diplomatic service of the Holy See.

== Biography ==
Tomasz Krzysztof Grysa was born on 16 October 1970 in Poznań, Poland. He was ordained a priest for the Archdiocese of Poznań on 25 May 1995 by Archbishop Jerzy Stroba.

He graduated from the Pontifical Ecclesiastical Academy.

He holds a PhD degree in canon law at the Pontifical Gregorian University.

== Diplomatic career ==
He entered the Holy See Diplomatic Service on 1 July 2001 and subsequently served in the following pontifical representations: Russian Federation, India, Belgium, Mexico, Brazil, UN Permanent Mission (New York), Israel, and the apostolic delegation in Jerusalem and Palestine.

On 27 September 2022, Pope Francis appointed him Titular Archbishop of Rubicon and Apostolic Nuncio to Madagascar and Apostolic Delegate to Comoros. He was consecrated as an archbishop on 1 November 2022.

On 9 February 2023, Pope Francis appointed him as nuncio to the Seychelles as well.

On 21 March 2023, Pope Francis appointed him as nuncio to the Mauritius as well.

On 14 May 2026, Pope Leo XIV appointed him as the Nuncio to Uganda.

== See also ==
- List of heads of the diplomatic missions of the Holy See
