= Augustine Kasujja =

Ugandan prelate of the Catholic Church (born 1946)

His Excellency, The Most Reverend Augustine Kasujja
- Apostolic Nuncio emeritus to Belgium and Luxembourg; Titular Archbishop of Caesarea in Numidia
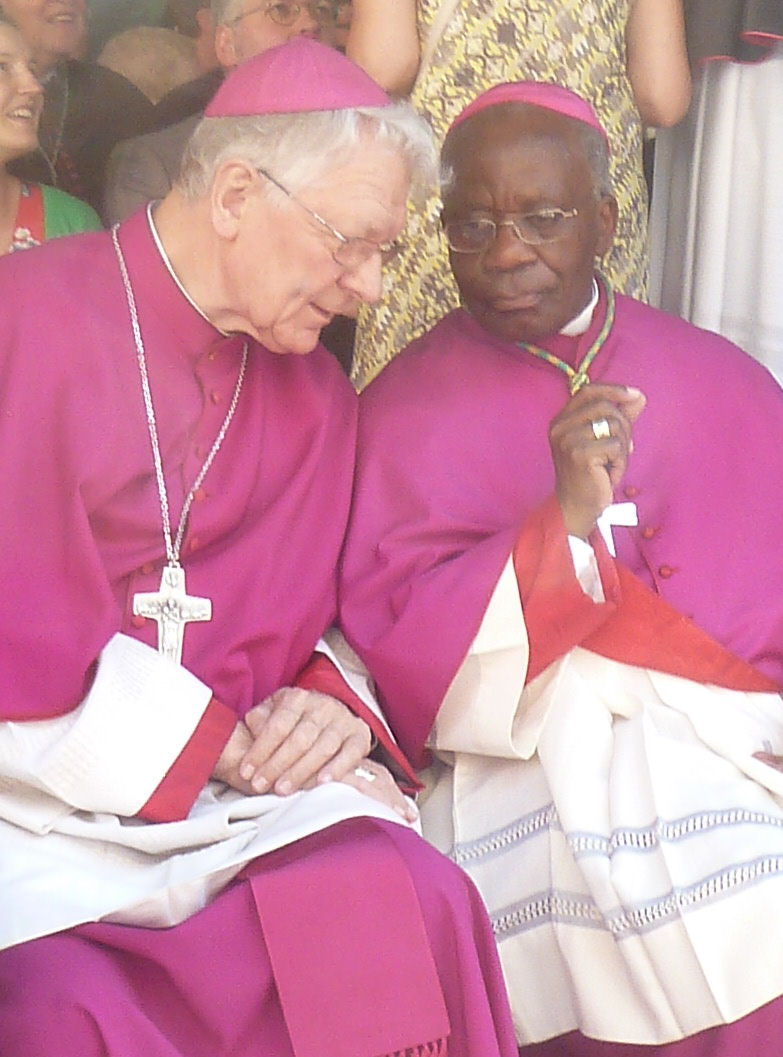
- Bishop Lucas Van Looy and Archbishop Kasujja in Bruges, 2017
- Appointed: 12 October 2016
- Retired: 31 August 2021
- Predecessor: Giacinto Berloco
- Successor: Franco Coppola
- Other post: Titular Archbishop of Caesarea in Numidia
- Previous posts: Permanent Observer to ECOWAS (2013–2016); Apostolic Nuncio to Nigeria (2010–2016); Apostolic Nuncio to Madagascar, Seychelles, Mauritius and Apostolic Delegate to Comoros (2004–2010); Apostolic Nuncio to Algeria and Tunisia (1998–2004)

Personal details
- Born: 26 April 1946 (age 80) Mitala Maria, Mpigi District, Uganda

Ordination history
History
Priestly ordination
- Ordained by: Pope Paul VI
Episcopal consecration
- Principal consecrator: Emmanuel Wamala
- Co-consecrators: Carlo Maria Viganò, Paul Lokiru Kalanda
Episcopal succession
Bishops consecrated by Augustine Kasujja as principal consecrator
- Stephen Dami Mamza: 2011
- Bulus Dauwa Yohanna: 2012
- Jonas Benson Okoye: 2014
- Wilfred Chikpa Anagbe: 2014

Styles of Augustine Kasujja
- Reference style: His Excellency; The Most Reverend
- Spoken style: Your Excellency
- Religious style: Archbishop

Augustine Kasujja (born 26 April 1946) is a Ugandan prelate of the Catholic Church who works in the diplomatic service of the Holy See. He was the Apostolic Nuncio to Belgium and Luxembourg from 2016 to 2021.

He was the first native African to hold the title of apostolic nuncio.

== Biography ==
The third in a family of 11 children, he was born to Katalina Nanseko and Yozefu Naluswa in Mitala Maria, Mpigi District on 26 April 1946.

Before joining Kisubi Minor Seminary between 1960 and 1965, he attended Ssango and Mitala Maria Primary Schools. He studied at the major seminary in Katigondo (1966–1967) and the Pontifical Urban University in Rome (1967–1974). He was ordained a priest of the Archdiocese of Kampala on 3 January 1973.

== Diplomatic career ==
After earning a doctorate in theology, he entered the diplomatic service of the Holy See in 1979. His postings included Argentina, Haiti, Bangladesh, Portugal, Peru, Trinidad and Tobago, Algeria, Tunisia, and Mauritius.

Pope John Paul II appointed him titular archbishop of Caesarea in Numidia and Apostolic Nuncio to Tunisia and Algeria on 26 May 1998. He was the first black African to hold the title of apostolic nuncio. He received his episcopal consecration on 22 August in Rubaga Cathedral from Cardinal Emmanuel Wamala.

On 22 April 2004, Pope John Paul named him Apostolic Nuncio to Madagascar and the Seychelles and Apostolic Delegate to Comoros and Réunion. On 9 June 2004, to those responsibilities were added those of the Nuncio to Mauritius.

On 2 February 2010, Pope Benedict XVI appointed him Apostolic Nuncio to Nigeria. Pope Francis, on 13 December 2013, added to his responsibilities the role of permanent observer to the Economic Community of Western African States (ECOWAS).

On 12 October 2016, Pope Francis appointed him Apostolic Nuncio to Belgium, adding the position of Nuncio to Luxembourg on 7 December. He was the first non-European to occupy the Belgian posting. He presented his credentials to the king and the grand duke on 2 February and 2 March.

Pope Francis accepted his resignation on 31 August 2021.

== See also ==
- Catholic Church in Uganda
- List of diplomatic posts of the Holy See
- List of heads of the diplomatic missions of the Holy See
