= Rubicon (titular see) =

Titular see of the Roman Catholic Church

Since 1969 Rubicon has been a titular see of the Roman Catholic Church. It takes its name from the lapsed Diocese of Rubicón in Spain, previously a suffragan in the ecclesiastical province of the Archdiocese of Seville.

Titular Bishops of Rubicon
No.	Name	Office	From	To
1	Jaime Flores Martin	Bishop emeritus of Barbastro-Monzón (Spain)	30 April 1970	11 December 1970
2	Oskar Saier	Auxiliary bishop in Freiburg (Germany)	7 April 1972	15 March 1978
3	José Sánchez González	Auxiliary bishop in Oviedo (Spain)	15 January 1980	11 September 1991
4	Stanisław Gądecki	Auxiliary bishop in Gniezno (Poland)	1 February 1992	28 March 2002
5	Joaquín Carmelo Borobia Isasa	Auxiliary bishop in Toledo (Spain)	21 October 2004	23 April 2022
6	Tomasz Grysa	Apostolic Nuncio	27 September 2022	
