= Paolo Mosconi =

Italian prelate

Paolo Mosconi (13 September 1914 – 14 December 1981) was an Italian prelate of the Catholic Church who worked in the diplomatic service of the Holy See. He became an archbishop in 1967 and served briefly as Apostolic Nuncio in Madagascar and Iraq.

== Biography ==
Paolo Mosconi was born on 13 September 1914 in Santa Giuletta, Italy. He was ordained a priest on 2 April 1938.

To prepare for a diplomatic career he entered the Pontifical Ecclesiastical Academy in 1942.

On 9 November 1967, Pope Paul VI appointed him titular archbishop of Leges and Apostolic Pro-Nuncio to Madagascar. He received his episcopal consecration on 10 December 1967 from Cardinal Amleto Cicognani. He was replaced on 26 February 1969 and took a position in the Roman Curia.

On 11 April 1970, Pope Paul named him Apostolic Pro-Nuncio to Iraq. He resigned for health reasons and was replaced in May 1971.

He died on 14 December 1981 at the age of 67.
