= Apostolic Delegation to Comoros =

Diplomatic post of the Holy See

The Apostolic Delegation to Comoros is an ecclesiastical office of the Catholic Church in Comoros. It is headed by the Apostolic Delegate, a member of the diplomatic service of the Holy See, who represents the interests of the Holy See to Church officials, the government, and civil society in Comoros. It is not a diplomatic post. The title Apostolic Delegate to Comoros is held by the prelate appointed Apostolic Nuncio to Madagascar; he resides in Antananarivo.

== Papal representatives to Comoros ==
- Bruno Musarò (25 September 1999 - 10 February 2004)
- Augustine Kasujja (22 April 2004 - 2 February 2010)
- Eugene Martin Nugent (13 February 2010 - 10 January 2015)
- Paolo Rocco Gualtieri (13 November 2015 – 6 August 2022)
- Tomasz Grysa (27 September 2022 – 14 May 2026)
