= Apostolic Nunciature to the Czech Republic =

Diplomatic Mission of the Holy See in Czech Republic

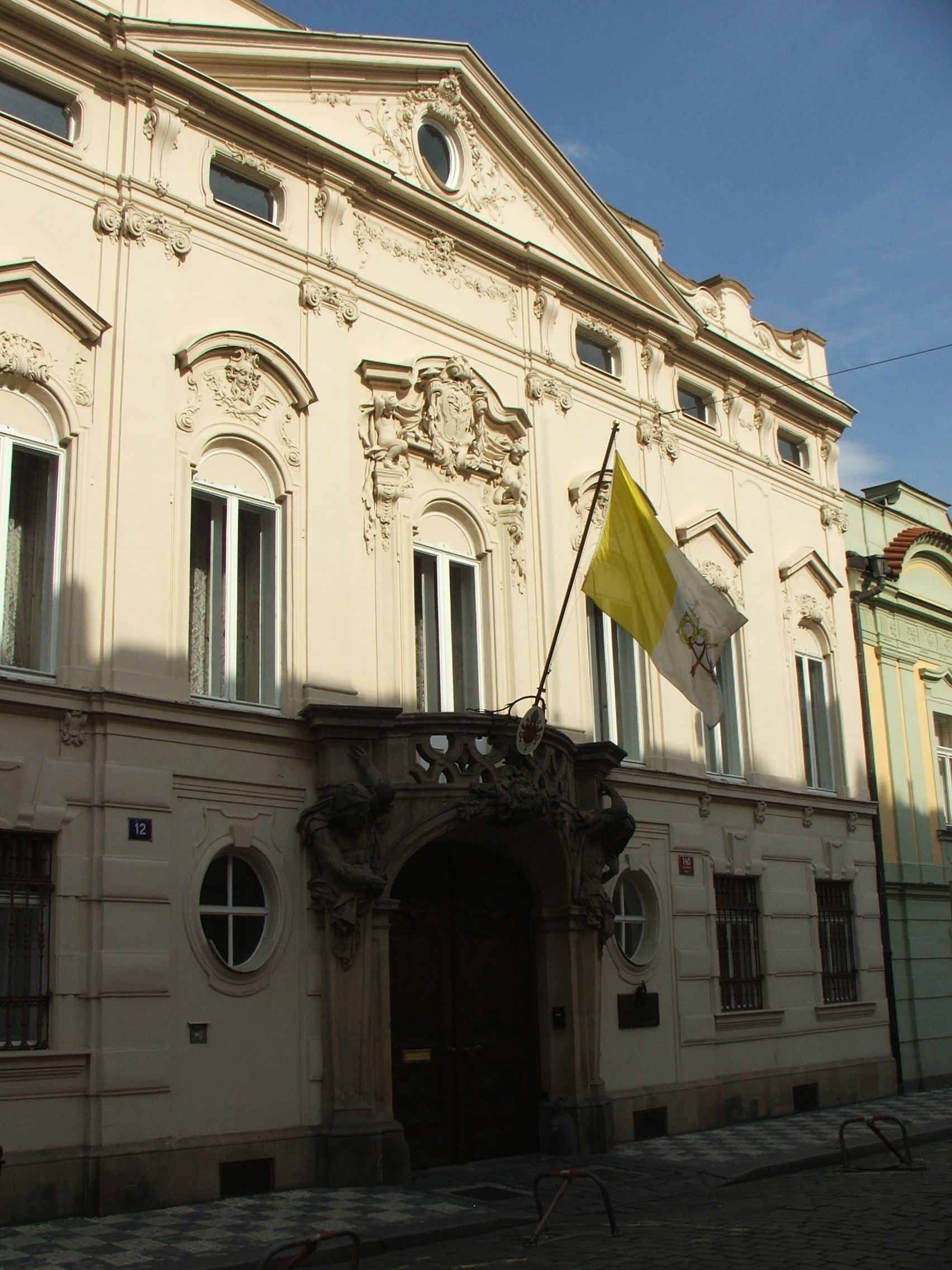
- Location: Prague, Czech Republic.
- Address: Voršilská 140, 110 00 Nové Město, Prague, Czech Republic.
- Coordinates: 50°04′52.0″N 14°25′00.0″E
- Apostolic Nuncio: Archbishop Eugene Nugent

The Apostolic Nunciature to the Czech Republic (Czech: Apoštolská nunciatura v České republice) is the diplomatic mission of the Holy See to the Czech Republic. It is located in Prague. The current Apostolic Nuncio is Archbishop Eugene Nugent, who was named to the position by Pope Leo XIV on 25 May 2026.

The nunciature is an ecclesiastical office of the Catholic Church in the Czech Republic, with the rank of an embassy. The nuncio serves both as the ambassador of the Holy See to the President of the Czech Republic, and as delegate and point-of-contact between the Catholic hierarchy in the Czech Republic and the pope.

== Holy See-Czech Republic relations ==
Relations between the Holy See and what is now the Czech Republic began in 1919 with the dissolution of the Austro-Hungarian Empire but the relationship between the Holy See and the government of Czechoslovakia was strained more often than not.

After the fall of Communism, in April 1990 the Holy See re-established official diplomatic relations with Czechoslovakia. This was followed in 1993 with the Holy See recognising the Czech Republic in January 1993.

After 2000 talks on a concordat began. This was signed in 200 but in May 2003, the Chamber of Deputies voted overwhelmingly to reject ratification.

In 2013 Parliament passed the Church Restitution Law where the Czech state returned 56% of seized assets to local religious groups and pay €2.3 billion in financial compensation over 30 years.

=== Concordat ===
On 24 October 2024, at the Office of the Prime Minister an Agreement between the Holy See and the Czech Republic on some legal questions was signed by Cardinal Parolin and Petr Fiala. The agreement affirms the right of religious freedom, the right of the Church to operate according to her own rules. It guarantees the right of conscientious objection to military and medical workers. It also protects the inviolability of the sacramental seal, without conditions. It also recognises the Church's right to establish educational and charitable bodies.

In 2026 the Constitutional Court halted the ratification of a concordat, citing violations of the country's constitutional order. The ruling, freezes the treaty over concerns about the total secrecy of confession and involves access to ecclesiastical archives.

== Nuncios ==
Archbishop Giovanni Coppa was named Apostolic Nuncio to Czechoslovakia on 30 June 1990. With the division on that country into Slovakia and the Czech Republic on 1 January 1993, Coppa became nuncio to each of them, based in Prague.

- Giovanni Coppa (1 January 1993 – 19 May 2001)
- Erwin Josef Ender (19 May 2001 – 25 November 2003)
- Diego Causero (10 January 2004 – 28 May 2011)
- Giuseppe Leanza (15 September 2011 – 21 September 2018)
- Charles Daniel Balvo (21 September 2018 – 17 January 2022)
- Jude Thaddeus Okolo (1 May 2022 – 11 February 2026)
- Eugene Nugent (25 May 2026 – present)

== See also ==
- Apostolic Nunciature to Slovakia
- Apostolic Nunciature to Czechoslovakia
- List of diplomatic missions of the Holy See
- List of diplomatic missions in the Czech Republic
- Foreign relations of the Holy See
- Roman Catholicism in the Czech Republic
