= Sasabe, Aragon =

Roman Catholic titular see in Spain

Coordinates: 42°40′33″N 0°35′26″W

Sasabe (or Sasave), a small place near Jaca in Huesca province, Aragon region, Spain is an ermitage that became a former semi-itinerant bishopric and is now a Latin Catholic titular see.

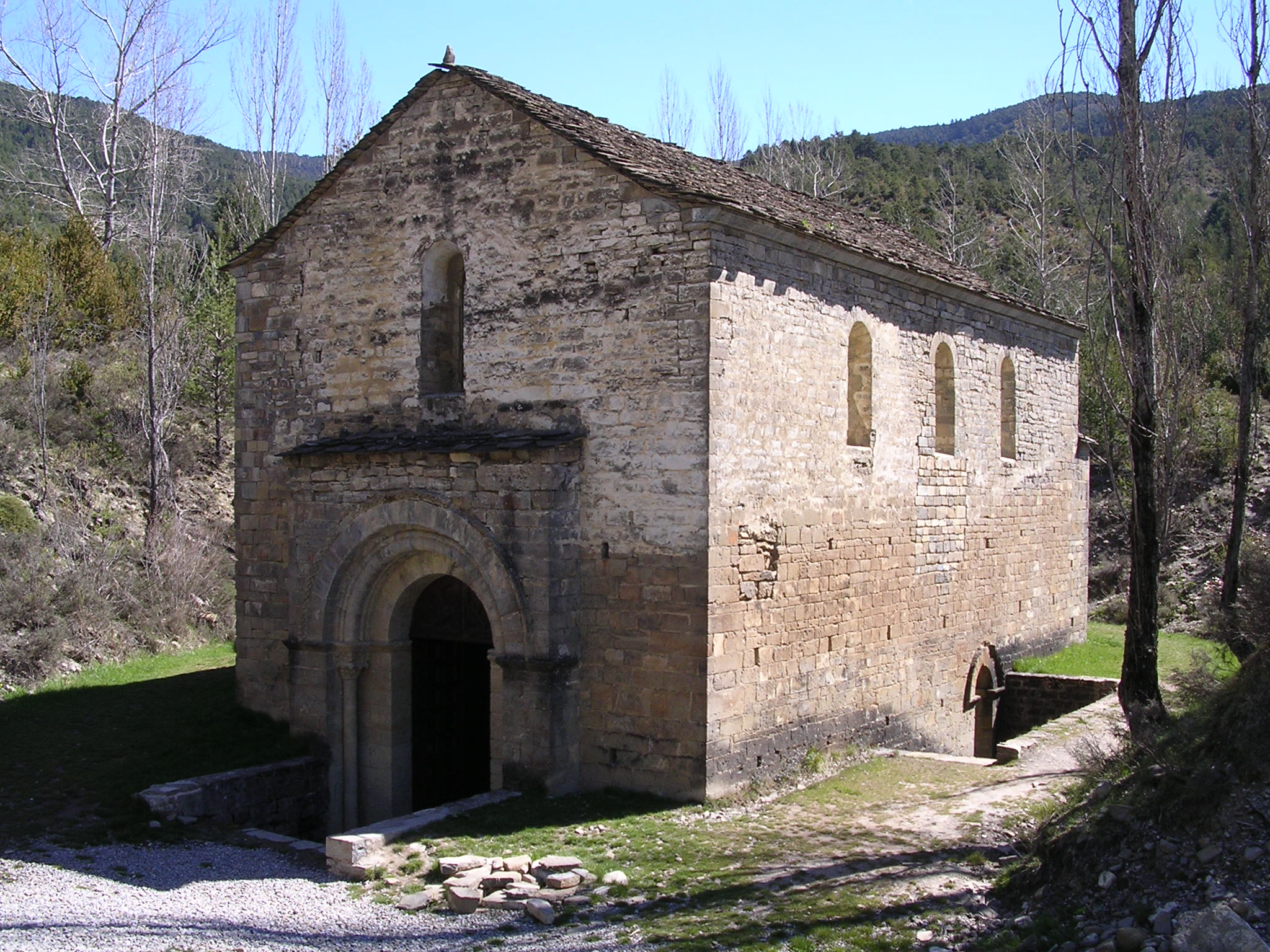
San Adrián de Sasabe

== Ecclesiastical history ==
The Ermita de San Adrián de Sasabe (Spanish: Monasterio de San Adrián de Sasabe), a former hermitage or monastery in Sasabe, established in the 9th century, of which only the small Romanesque church now survives, was one of three monasteries (along San Juan de la Peña and San Pedro de Siresa) near Jaca where, as well as in that city, the itinerant 'Bishops of Aragon' (or of Huesca or of Jaca) used to reside, who held the apostolic succession of the Ancient Diocese of Huesca after its destruction in the Moorish conquest.

In 922 a bishopric was established, suffragan of the Metropolitan Archdiocese of Tarragona, with the title Diocese of Sasabe (Curiate Italian) / Sasaben(sis) (Latin adjective), assigning territory split off from the Diocese of Pamplona.

In the eleventh century, the monastery church of San Adrián de Sasabe was a cathedral as the episcopal seat of this future Diocese of Jaca before construction of the cathedral of Jaca.

In 1077 the bishopric was suppressed, its territory being reassigned to establish the Diocese of Jaca.

=== Bishops of Sasabe ===
- Ferriolus (c. 922)
- Fortuño (933–947)
- Aureolus (971–978)
- Atón (c. 981)
- Mancius = Mancio (1011? – 1036)
- Garcia (1036–1057)
- Sancho (1058–1075).

=== Titular see ===
In 1969 the diocese was nominally restored as Titular bishopric of Sasabe (Curiate Italian) / Sasaben(sis) (Latin adjective).

It has had the following incumbents, of the fitting Episcopal (lowest) rank, with an archiepiscopal exception:

- Santo Bergamo (1969.12.15 – 1971.11.18) as Apostolic Administrator of Rossano (Italy) (1969.12.15 – 1971.11.18), later Apostolic Administrator of Oppido Mamertina (Italy) (1971.11.18 – 1979.06.10), succeeding as Bishop of restyled bishopric Oppido Mamertina–Palmi (1979.06.10 – death 1980.10.11)
- Alphonse Gallegos, Augustinian Recollects (O.A.R.) (1981.08.24 – death 1991.10.06) as Auxiliary Bishop of Sacramento (California, USA) (1981.08.24 – 1991.10.06)
- Julián Barrio Barrio (1992.12.31 – 1996.01.05) as Auxiliary Bishop of Santiago de Compostela (Spain) (1992.12.31 – 1996.01.05), later succeeding as Metropolitan Archbishop of (Santiago de) Compostela (1996.01.05 – ...)
- Juan José Omella Omella (1996.07.15 – 1999.10.29) as Auxiliary Bishop of Zaragoza (Spain) (1996.07.15 – 1999.10.29); later Bishop of Barbastro–Monzón (Spain) (1999.10.29 – 2004.04.08), Bishop of Calahorra y La Calzada–Logroño (Spain) (2004.04.08 – 2015.11.06), Metropolitan Archbishop of Barcelona (Catalonia, Spain) (2015.11.06 – ...)
- Titular Archbishop Giacomo Guido Ottonello (1999.11.29 – ...)

== Sources and external links ==
- GCatholic - Sasabe (titular) bishopric, with Google satellite photo
- GCatholic - San Adrián de Sasabe church, with Google satellite photo

== Gallery ==
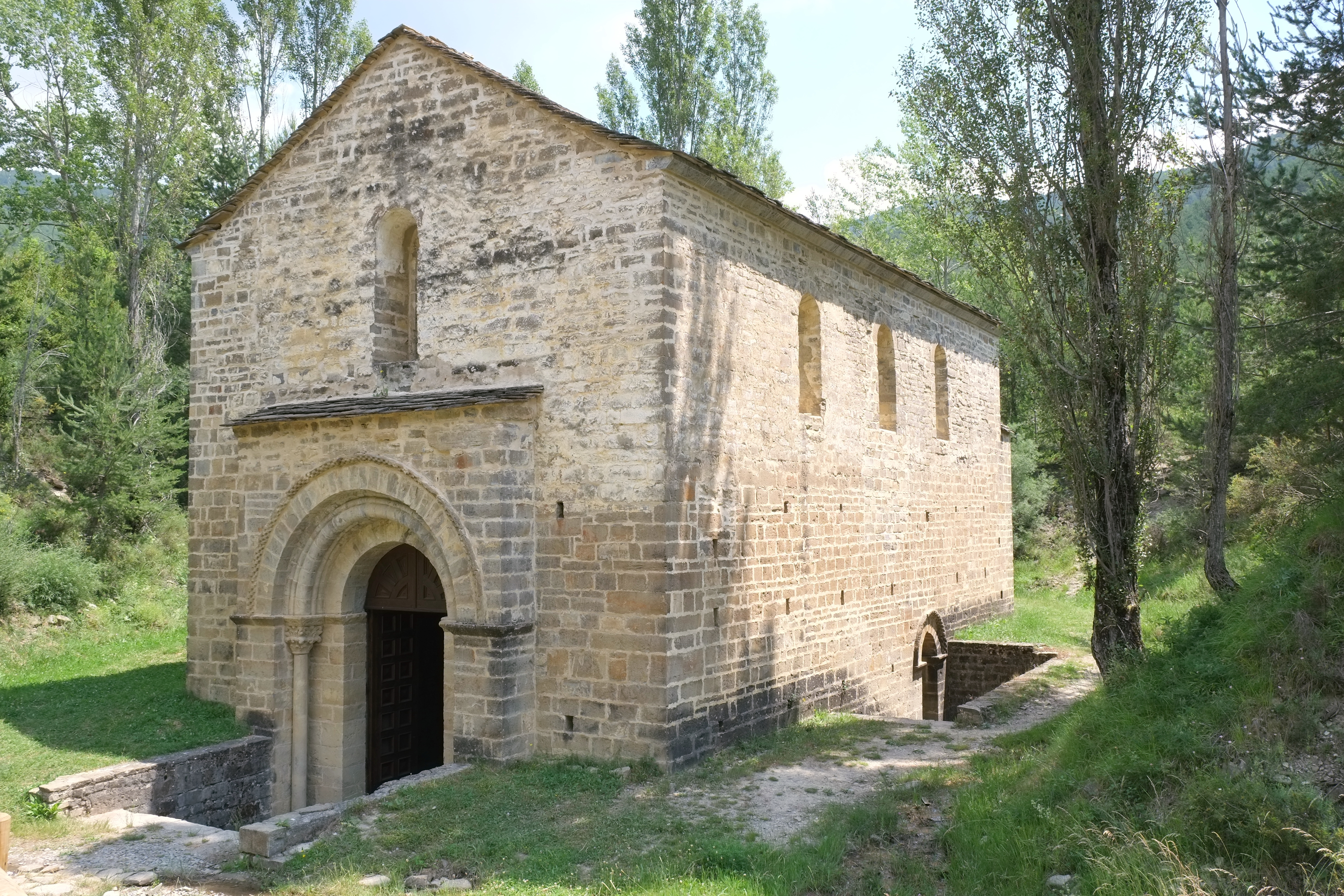
Exterior of the church

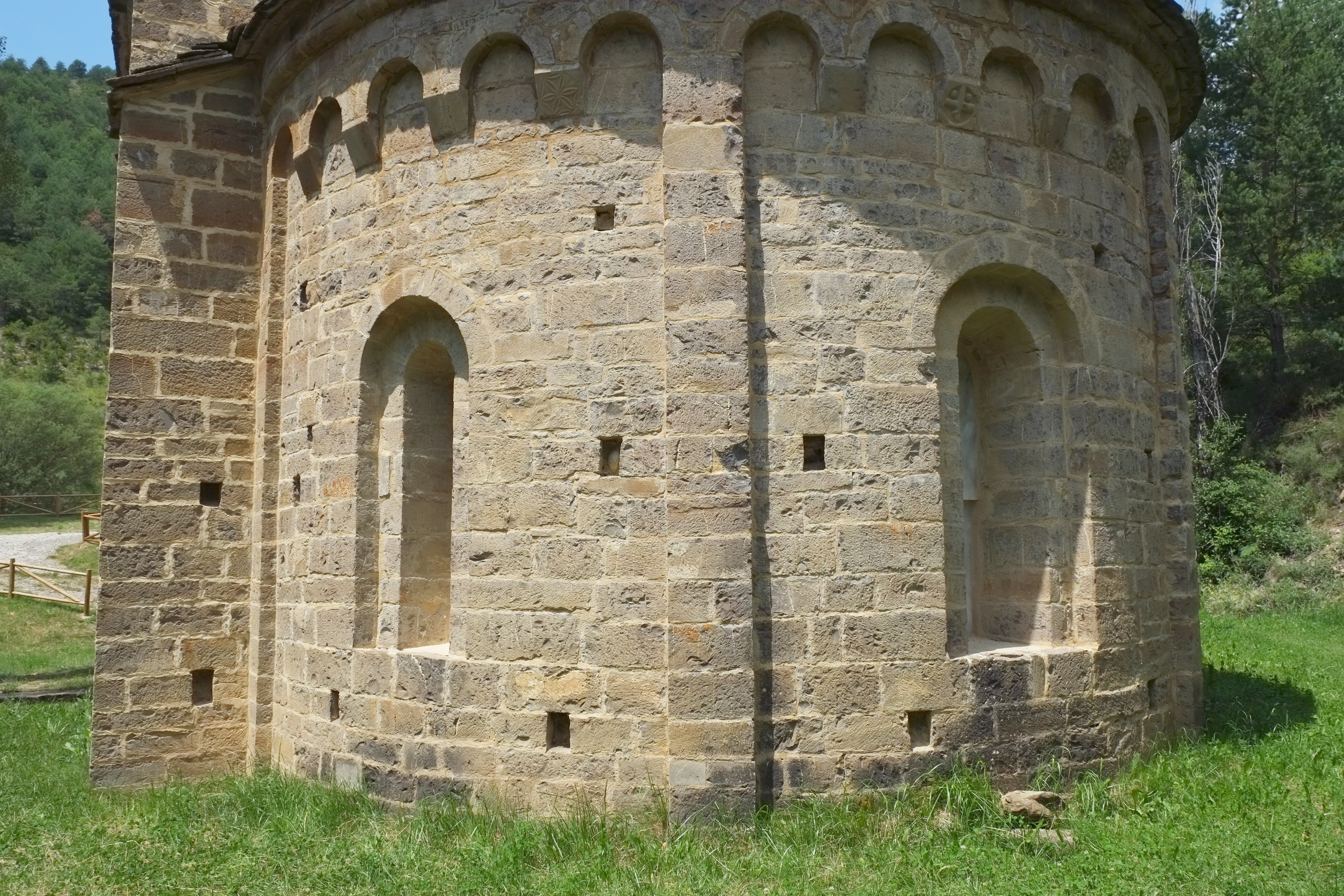
Exterior: Apse

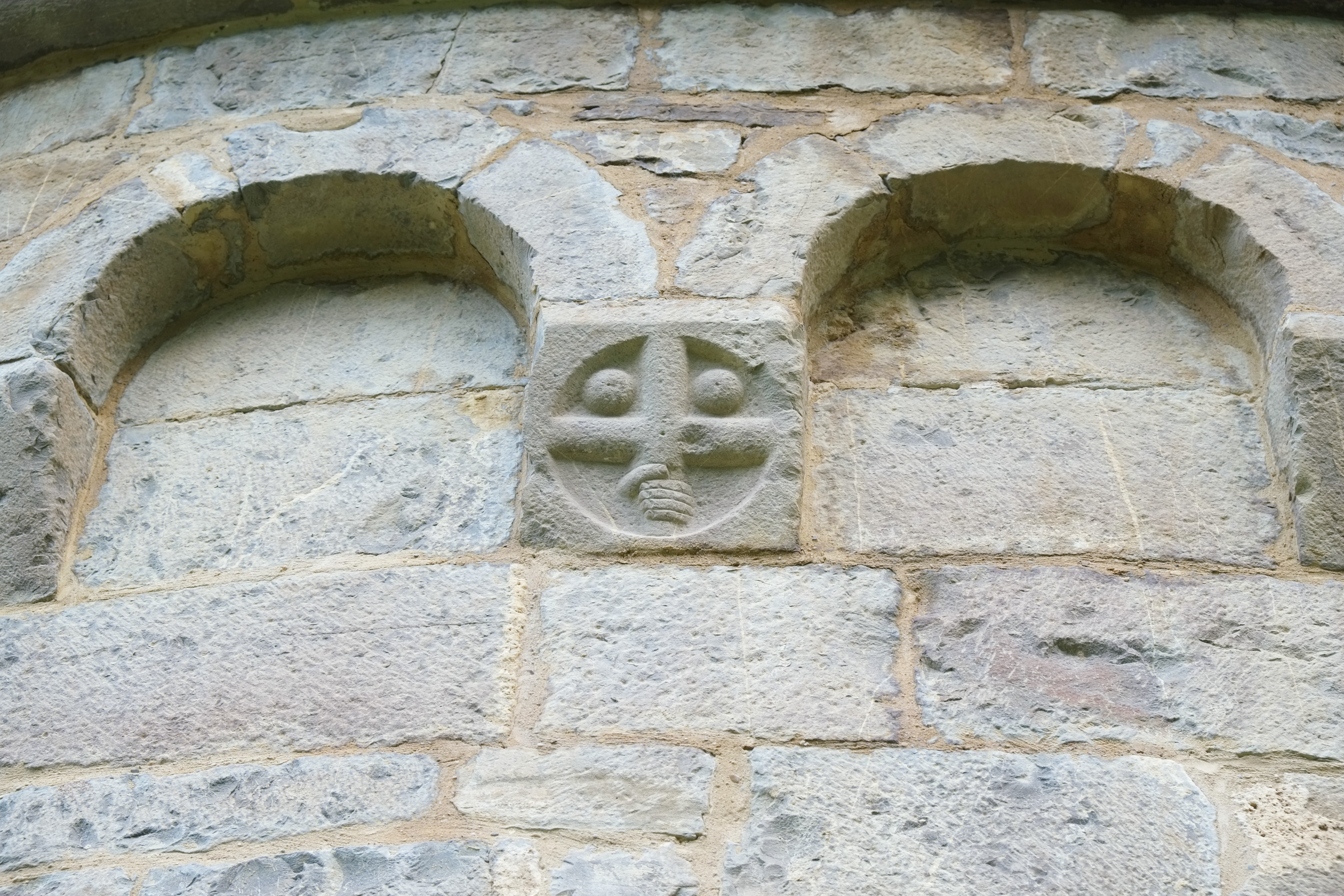
Detail of the apse

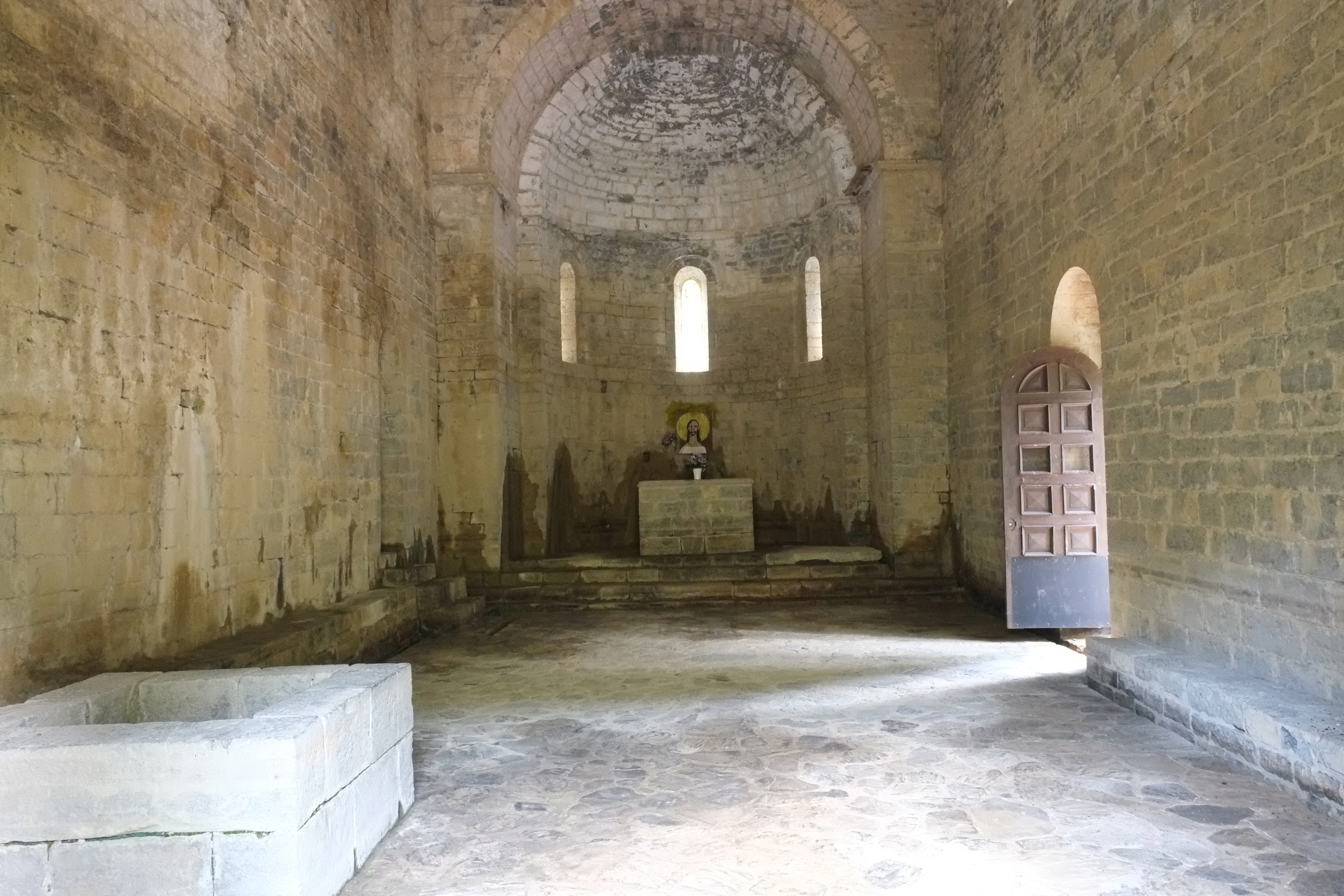
Interior

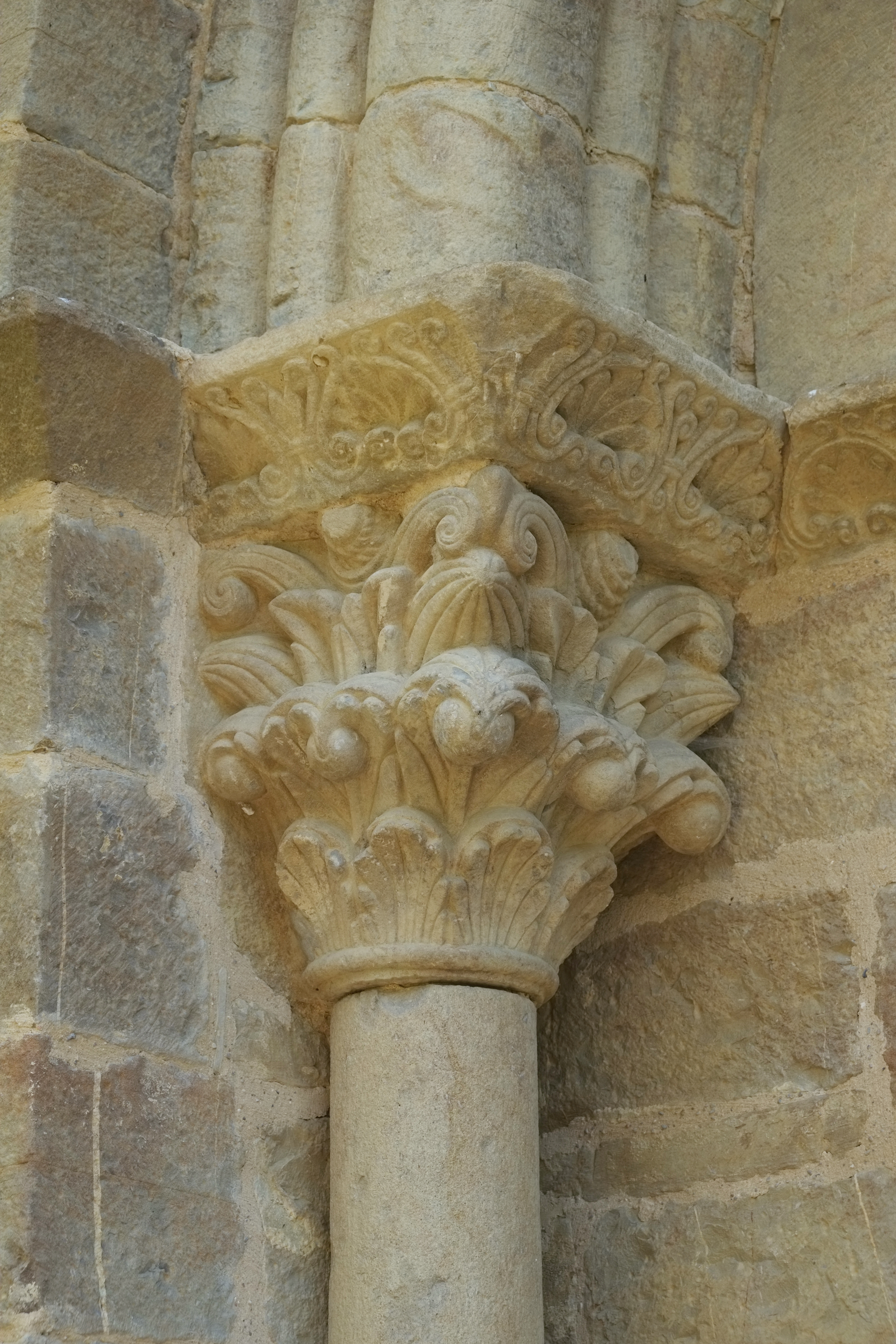
Capital with vegetal decoration

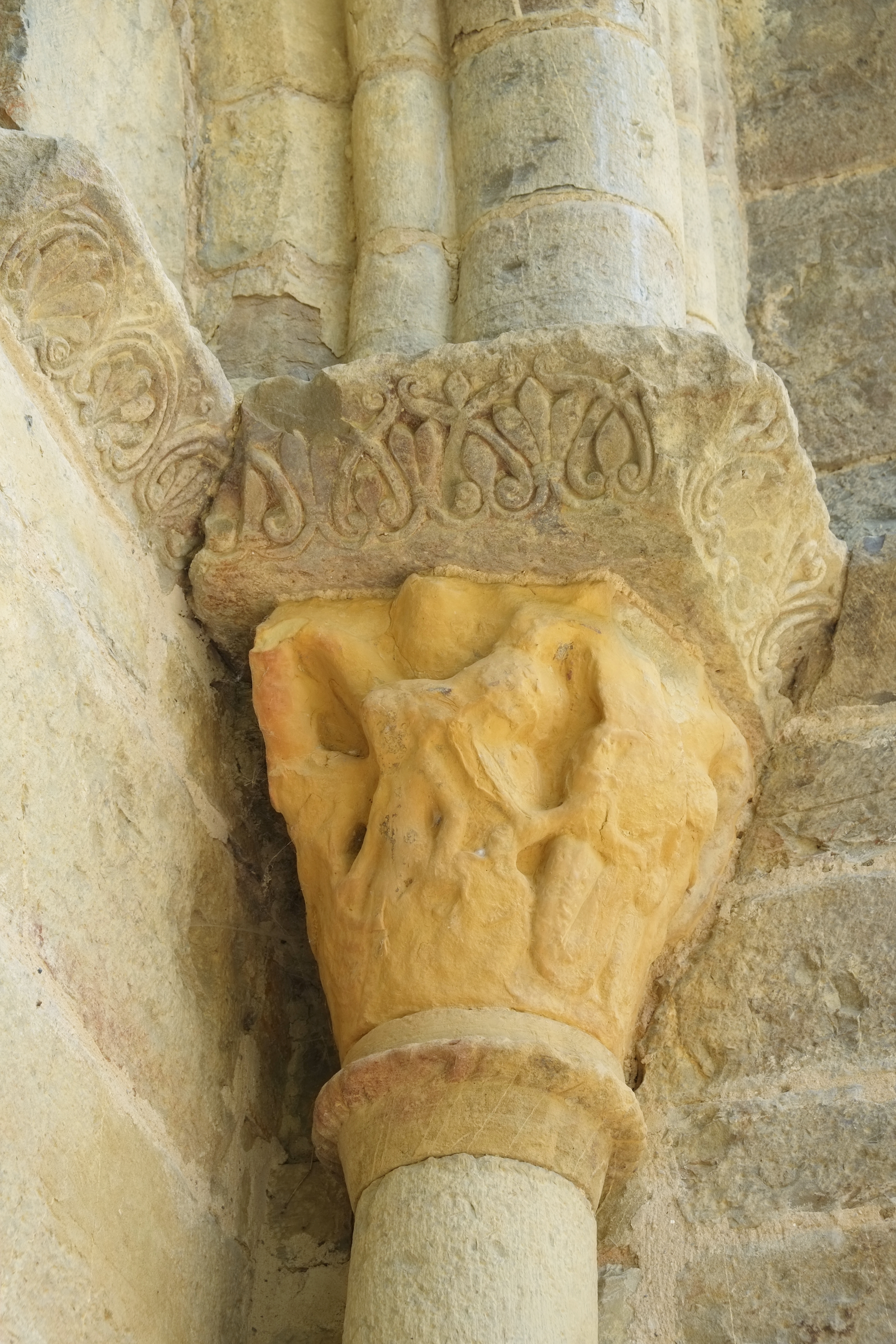
Capital
