= Emanuele Clarizio =

Italian prelate

Emanuele Clarizio (18 May 1911 – 16 April 2001) was an Italian prelate of the Catholic Church who worked in the diplomatic service of the Holy See from 1939 to 1970, serving with the title of archbishop as the principal papal representative in Pakistan, the Dominican Republic, and Canada. From 1970 to 1986 he headed the Vatican department for the care of migrants.

== Biography ==
Emanuele Clarizio was born on 18 May 1911 in Milan. Studied at the Minor and Major Pontifical Seminaries of Rome, at the Lateran University. He earned degrees in Canon Law, Theology and Philosophy. He was ordained a priest in Rome on 7 December 1933.

To prepare for a diplomatic career he entered the Pontifical Ecclesiastical Academy in 1938. His early assignments included stints in the Secretariat of State from 1939 to 1947, and then abroad in the papal representations to the United States from 1947 to 1949, Australia, New Zealand and Oceania from 1949 to 1954, and France from 1954 to 1958.

His first senior diplomatic posting was on 10 July 1958 as the first Apostolic Internuncio to Pakistan.

On 14 October 1961, Pope John XXIII appointed him titular archbishop of Claudiopolis in Isauria and Apostolic Nuncio to the Dominican Republic. He received his episcopal consecration on 29 October 1962. There he tried to ease political tensions by calling for–or negotiating–the release of political prisoners. In 1965 he organized a ceasefire between the government and rebel forces. His campaign against government-sanctioned violence—a reversal of the Church's longtime support for authoritarian rule in the country—drew charges he supported Communists.

On 11 June 1967, Pope Paul VI named him Apostolic Delegate to Canada. His title changed to Apostolic Pro-Nuncio on 16 October 1969 and his titular see changed to Antium.

On 30 April 1970, Pope Paul appointed him Vice President of the Pontifical Commission for the Pastoral Care of Migrants and Itinerant People. until replaced on 18 September 1986 by Giovanni Cheli.

He also held the position of President of the Peregrinatio ad Petri Sedem, the Vatican agency that supports pilgrims to Rome, from 17 November 1982

He died on 16 April 2001.
