= Apostolic Nunciature to Seychelles =

Diplomatic mission of the Holy See in the Indian Ocean

The Apostolic Nunciature to Seychelles is an ecclesiastical office of the Catholic Church in Seychelles. It is a diplomatic post of the Holy See, whose representative is called the Apostolic Nuncio with the rank of an ambassador that enjoys some additional privileges. The title Apostolic Nuncio to Seychelles is held by the prelate appointed Apostolic Nuncio to Madagascar; he resides in Madagascar.

== List of papal representatives ==
- Clemente Faccani (7 February 1985 – 14 May 1994)
- Blasco Francisco Collaço (14 May 1994 – 13 April 1996)
- Adriano Bernardini (15 June 1996 – 24 July 1999)
- Bruno Musarò (25 September 1999 – 10 February 2004)
- Augustine Kasujja (22 April 2004 – 2 February 2010)
- Eugene Nugent (13 March 2010 – 10 January 2015)
- Paolo Rocco Gualtieri (26 September 2015 – 6 August 2022)
- Tomasz Grysa (9 February 2023 – 14 May 2026)

== See also ==
- Catholic Church in Seychelles
