= Giovanni Coppa =

Roman Catholic Cardinal

His Eminence Giovanni Coppa
- Cardinal-Deacon of San Lino
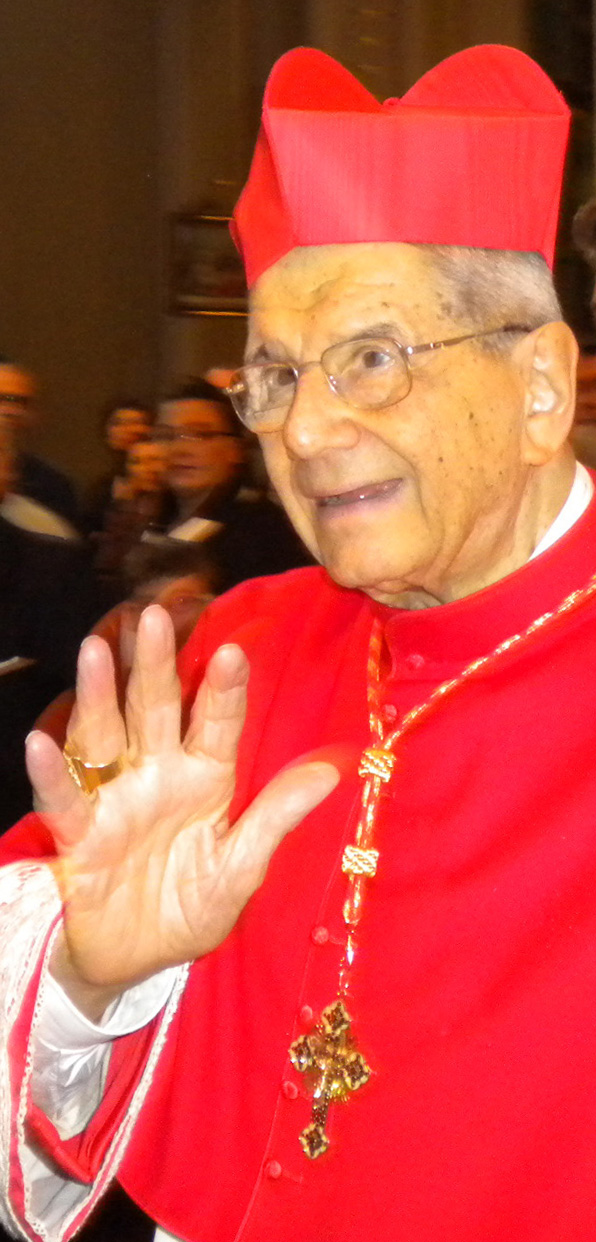
- Cardinal Coppa in 2012
- Church: Roman Catholic Church
- Previous posts: Titular Archbishop of Serta (1980–2007); Apostolic Nuncio to Czechoslovakia (1990–1993); Apostolic Nuncio to Czech Republic (1993–2001); Apostolic Nuncio to Slovakia (1993–1994)

Orders
- Ordination: 2 January 1949
- Consecration: 6 January 1980 by Pope John Paul II
- Created cardinal: 24 November 2007 by Pope Benedict XVI
- Rank: Cardinal-Deacon

Personal details
- Born: 9 November 1925 Alba, Italy
- Died: 16 May 2016 (aged 90)
- Denomination: Roman Catholic Church
- Coat of arms
Styles of Giovanni Coppa
- Reference style: His Eminence
- Spoken style: Your Eminence
- Informal style: Cardinal

Giovanni Coppa (9 November 1925 – 16 May 2016) was an Italian cardinal of the Roman Catholic Church. He served as a diplomat of the Holy See, and was elevated to the rank of cardinal in 2007.

== Biography ==
Born in Alba on 9 November 1925, Giovanni Coppa attended the seminary there before studying at the Catholic University of the Sacred Heart in Milan, where he obtained his doctorate in modern letters with a dissertation entitled: "The iconography of the Most Holy Trinity from the origins to the 14th century". He was ordained to the priesthood on 2 January 1949, and then served as a diocesan delegate for the aspirants of Catholic Action. In 1952, he entered the Roman Curia in the Apostolic Chancery. Coppa became the director of the Rome-based monthly retreats of the nuns of the Holy Family of Spoleto in 1954, and began working in the Vatican Secretariat of State in 1958.

During the Second Vatican Council (1962–1965), Coppa served as an expert for the Latin language. He was named an honorary canon of the chapter of St. Peter's Basilica in 1965, and assessor of the Secretariat of State on 19 November 1975. He was also Vice-Chaplain of the Palatine Guard of Honor and responsible of the Conference of Saint Vincent of Paul. When the Association of Saints Peter and Paul was instituted at the Holy See, the Secretariat of State named Coppa as its counselor. He wrote several works on Saint Ambrose, the Gospels, and the Fathers of the Church, and contributed to L'Osservatore Romano as well.

On 1 December 1979, Coppa was appointed delegate for the Secretariat of State's pontifical representations and titular archbishop of Serta. He received his episcopal consecration in Saint Peter's Basilica on 6 January 1980 from Pope John Paul II with Archbishop Eduardo Martínez Somalo and Bishop Ferdinando Maggioni serving as co-consecrators.

Coppa was named Apostolic Nuncio to Czechoslovakia on 30 June 1990, and then to both the Czech Republic and Slovakia on 1 January 1993. He retired from his post in Slovakia on 2 March 1994 and from the Czech Republic on 19 May 2001.

Pope Benedict XVI created him Cardinal Deacon of S. Lino in the consistory of 24 November 2007.

Coppa died in Rome on 16 May 2016.

Diplomatic posts
Preceded by Saverio Ritter	Nuncio to Czechoslovakia; 1990–1993	Succeeded by None
Preceded by none	Apostolic Nuncio to the Czech Republic; 1993–2001	Succeeded by Erwin Josef Ender
Preceded by none	Nuncio to Slovakia; 1993–1994	Succeeded by Luigi Dossena
