= Giacomo Guido Ottonello =

Italian prelate of the Catholic Church (born 1946)

His Excellency, The Most Reverend Giacomo Guido Ottonello
- Apostolic Nuncio emeritus of Slovakia; Titular Archbishop of Sasabe
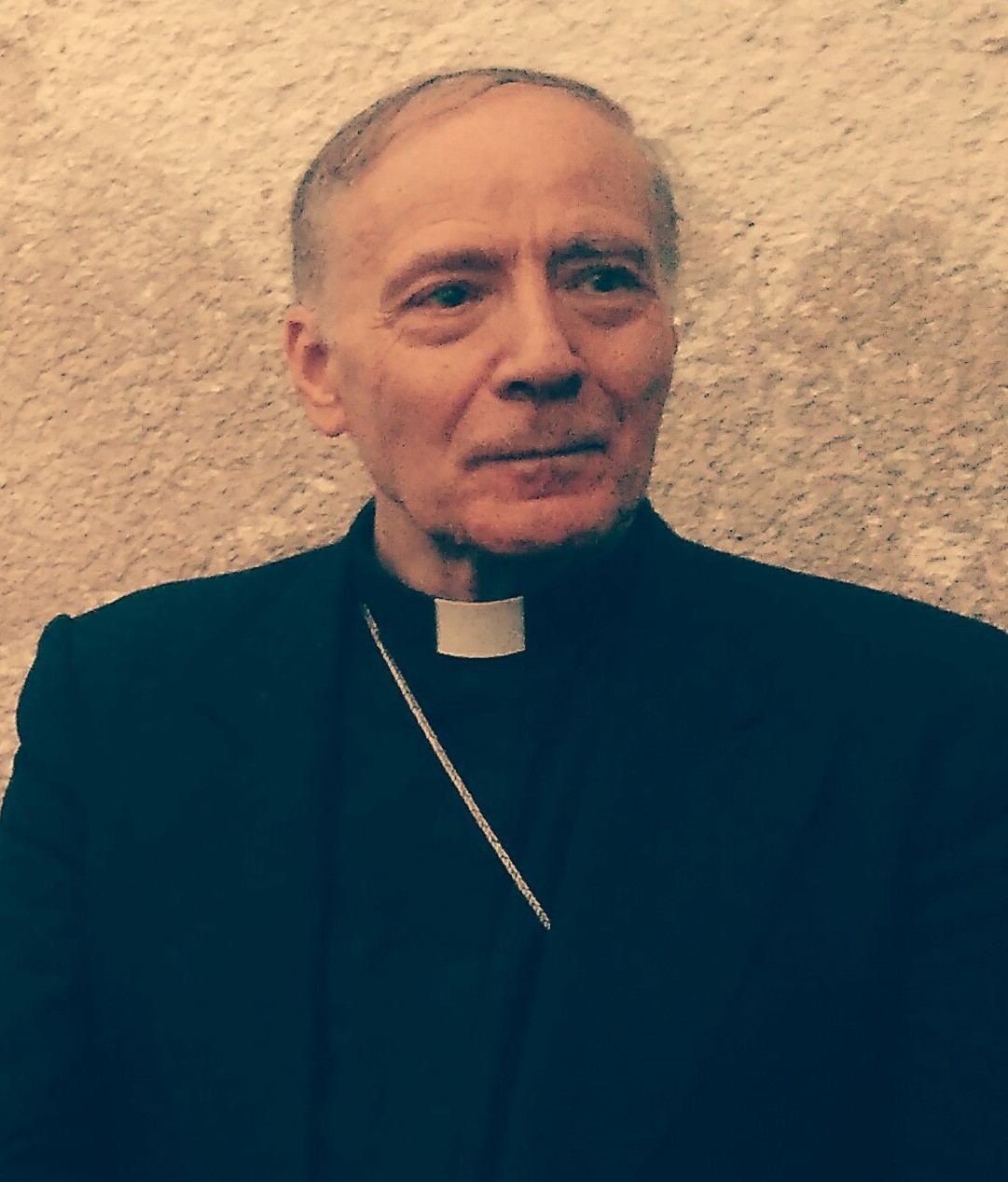
- Appointed: 1 April 2017
- Retired: 31 October 2021
- Predecessor: Mario Giordana
- Other post: Titular Archbishop of Sasabe
- Previous posts: Apostolic Nuncio of Ecuador (2005-2017); Apostolic Nuncio of Panama (1999-2005)

Orders
- Ordination: 29 June 1971
- Consecration: 6 January 2000 by John Paul II, Giovanni Battista Re, and Marcello Zago

Personal details
- Born: 29 August 1946 (age 79) Masone, Genoa, Italy

Styles of Giacomo Guido Ottonello
- Reference style: His Excellency; The Most Reverend
- Spoken style: Your Excellency
- Religious style: Archbishop

Giacomo Guido Ottonello (born 29 August 1946) is an Italian prelate of the Catholic Church who has spent his career in the diplomatic service of the Holy See. He was Apostolic Nuncio to Slovakia from 2017 to 2021 and Nuncio to Ecuador from 2005 to 2017.

== Biography ==
Giacomo Guido Ottonello was born in Masone, in the Province of Genoa, on 29 August 1946. He was ordained a priest of the Diocese of Acqui on 29 June 1961. On 25 March 1980 he entered the diplomatic service of the Holy See, working in Pakistan, El Salvador, Lebanon, France, Spain and Poland.

He earned a licentiate in canon law and then studied at the Pontifical Ecclesiastical Academy. He earned a doctorate in theology at the Pontifical Lateran University.

== Diplomatic career ==
On 29 November 1999, Pope John Paul II appointed him apostolic nuncio to Panama and titular archbishop of Sasabe.

On 26 February 2005, John Paul named him Nuncio to Ecuador, where for over twelve years he attempted dialogue and mediation with the anticlerical President Rafael Correa,

On 1 April 2017, Pope Francis appointed him apostolic nuncio to Slovakia. His resignation from the post was accepted on 31 October 2021.

== See also ==
- List of heads of the diplomatic missions of the Holy See
