= Apostolic Nunciature to Madagascar =

Diplomatic post of the Holy See

The Apostolic Nunciature to Madagascar is an ecclesiastical office of the Catholic Church in Madagascar. It is a diplomatic post of the Holy See, whose representative is called the Apostolic Nuncio with the rank of an ambassador. The Apostolic Nuncio to Madagascar is usually also the Apostolic Nuncio to Mauritius and Seychelles along with Apostolic Delegate to Comoros upon his appointment to said nations. The nuncio resides in Antananarivo.

Pope John XXIII established the Delegation to Madagascar on 3 May 1960 to represent its interests there to both Catholic Church and government officials. The Delegate had no diplomatic status. Pope Paul VI created the Nunciature on 9 January 1967.

== Apostolic Nuncios to Madagascar ==
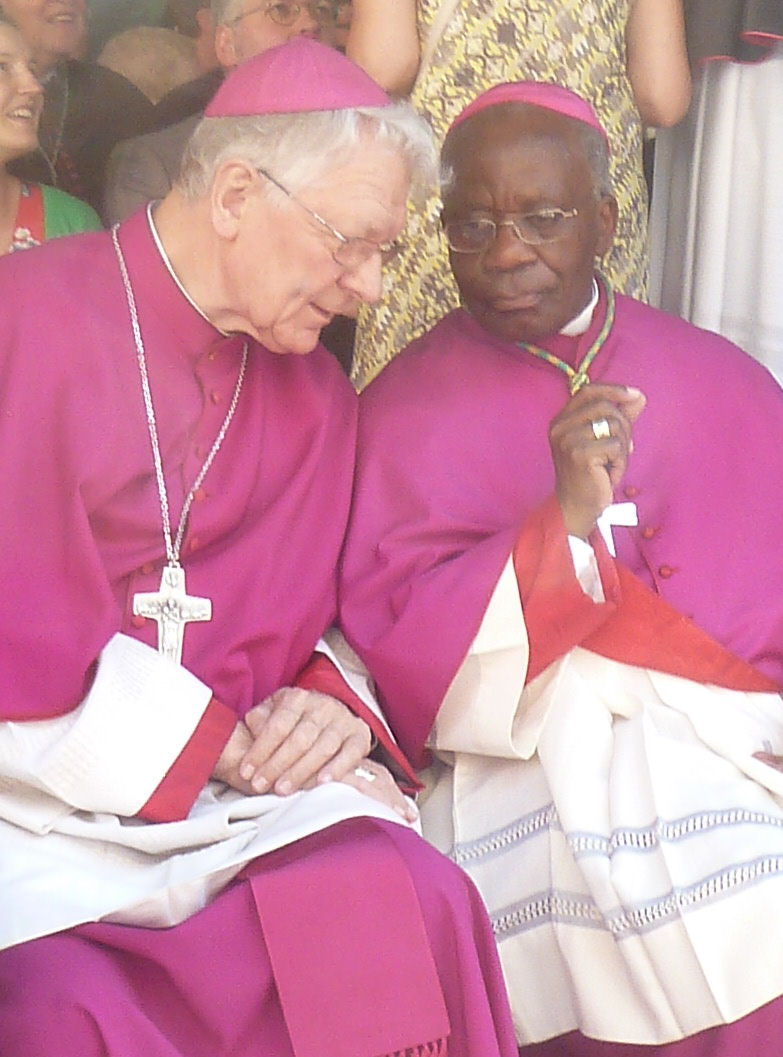
Mgr Kasujja

Apostolic Delegates

- Felice Pirozzi (19 September 1960 - 9 January 1967)

Apostolic Pro-Nuncios

- Paolo Mosconi (9 November 1967 - 1969)
- Michele Cecchini (1 March 1969 - 18 June 1976)
- Sergio Sebastiani (27 September 1976 - 8 January 1985)
- Agostino Marchetto (31 August 1985 - 7 December 1990)
- Blasco Francisco Collaço (28 February 1991 - 13 April 1996)

Apostolic Nuncios

- Adriano Bernardini (15 June 1996 - 24 July 1999)
- Bruno Musarò (25 September 1999 - 10 February 2004)
- Augustine Kasujja (22 April 2004 - 2 February 2010)
- Eugene Martin Nugent (13 February 2010 - 10 January 2015)
- Paolo Rocco Gualtieri (13 April 2015 – 6 August 2022)
- Tomasz Grysa (27 September 2022 – 14 May 2026)

== See also ==
- Roman Catholicism in Madagascar
- List of diplomatic missions in Madagascar
