= Michele Cecchini =

Italian prelate (1920–1989)

- Apostolic Nuncio to Austria
- Church: Catholic Church
- In office: 4 December 1984 – 26 April 1989
- Predecessor: Mario Cagna
- Successor: Donato Squicciarini
- Other post: Titular Archbishop of Aquileia (1969-1989)
- Previous posts: Apostolic Pro-Nuncio to Yugoslavia (1976-1984); Apostolic Pro-Nuncio to Madagascar & Mauritius (1969-1976)

Orders
- Ordination: 2 July 1944
- Consecration: 13 April 1969 by Amleto Giovanni Cicognani

Personal details
- Born: 3 March 1920 Lammari, Capannori, Province of Lucca, Kingdom of Italy
- Died: 26 April 1989 (aged 69)

Michele Cecchini (3 March 1920 – 26 April 1989) was an Italian prelate of the Catholic Church who devoted his entire career to the diplomatic service of the Holy See. He became an archbishop in 1969 and served as an Apostolic Nuncio from 1969 until his death.

== Biography ==
Michele Cecchini was born on 3 March 1920 in Lammari, Italy. He was ordained a priest of the Diocese of Lucca on 2 July 1944.

To prepare for a diplomatic career he entered the Pontifical Ecclesiastical Academy in 1949. He joined the diplomatic service in 1951.

On 26 February 1969, Pope Paul VI named him titular archbishop of Aquileia and Apostolic Pro-Nuncio to Madagascar. On 1 March 1969, he was named Apostolic Pro-Nuncio to Mauritius. He received his episcopal consecration on 13 April 1969 from Cardinal Amleto Cicognani.

On 18 June 1976, Pope John Paul II named him Apostolic Pro-Nuncio to Yugoslavia.

On 4 December 1984, Pope John Paul appointed him Apostolic Nuncio to Austria. There his role in appointing bishops of a more conservative bent, Hans Hermann Groër in Vienna and Georg Eder in Salzburg, for example, drew protests from Austrian clergy and transformed the Austrian hierarchy.

He died of cancer on 26 April 1989. He had been ill throughout his time in Austria.
