= Peregrinatio ad Petri Sedem =

Roman papal institution

The Peregrinatio ad Petri Sedem, abbreviated P.A.P.S., was a papal institution for assistance to pilgrims to Rome and certain other Catholic sites and events.

It was merged into the Administration of the Patrimony of the Apostolic See on 4 July 2016.

== History ==
It was founded by Pius XI at the conclusion of the extraordinary Jubilee of Redemption, when the Central Committee, set up that same Holy Year 1933–1934 to assist all pilgrims to Rome, was established as a permanent Office. Pope Paul VI erected it a Canonical Body in 1972; the reorganisation in 1977 confirmed the spiritual initiatives born during the Holy Year 1975.

On 16 January 1997 John Paul II granted it new Statutes which emphasized its pastoral characteristics and specified its purpose and nature:

- help particular Churches in order to promote the spiritual and material assistance to pilgrims visiting Peter's See, whether groups or individuals, who have come for a pious visit, especially for ecclesial events promoted by the Holy See.
- implement the provisions of the Central Committee during the Holy Years in order to ensure the appropriate reception of pilgrims traveling from Dioceses located throughout the world to Rome, in response to the appeals of the National and Diocesan Committees encouraging pilgrimages to Rome.
- assist and coordinate the flow of pilgrims directed to the various world Sanctuaries to participate in religious events led by the Pope.
- encourage the participation of the most needy to the above-mentioned pilgrimages.

== Organization ==
The Board of Directors endorses annual programs and balance sheets and expresses its opinion on major issues. The Pastoral Council, whose members are multinational and multilingual Pastoral workers, is in charge of issues concerning the spiritual activity of the pilgrims in order to fulfill the religious goals of the Peregrinatio. The Pope appoints the President of the Peregrinatio, usually an archbishop or a cardinal.

The Peregrinatio appoints its Delegates in different parts of the world, in agreement with the Ecclesiastic Authorities of the local Churches.

P.A.P.S. organizes guided tours for groups of pilgrims inside Vatican City and around Christian Rome. Sights include the Vatican Museums, Vatican Gardens, Catacombs of Rome and Papal basilicas, Liturgical Celebrations and Audiences with the Pope. It organizes Congresses (on demand), Masses, prayer gatherings and services with full assistance during Beatifications and Canonizations. It works primarily with religious institutions and houses which accommodate pilgrims as well as commercial hotels, restaurants and various other logistics, and offers air ticket services for employees of Vatican City, for the Departments and Offices of the Holy See and for all religious families.

== Leadership ==
The Peregrinatio was led by a president.

- Mr. Urbano Cioccetti (1975 – 9 May 1978)
- Archbishop Emanuele Clarizio (17 November 1982 – 1991)
- Cardinal Camillo Ruini (29 December 1992 – 2 May 1996)
- Archbishop Sergio Sebastiani (2 May 1996 – 3 November 1997)
- Archbishop Crescenzio Sepe (5 November 1997 – 25 July 2001)
- Archbishop Francesco Gioia, O.F.M. Cap. (25 July 2001 – 27 September 2007)
- Archbishop Francesco Gioia, O.F.M. Cap. (23 January 2013 – 4 July 2016)
