= Stanisław Gądecki =

Polish archbishop

His Excellency Stanisław Gądecki
- Archbishop Emeritus of Poznań
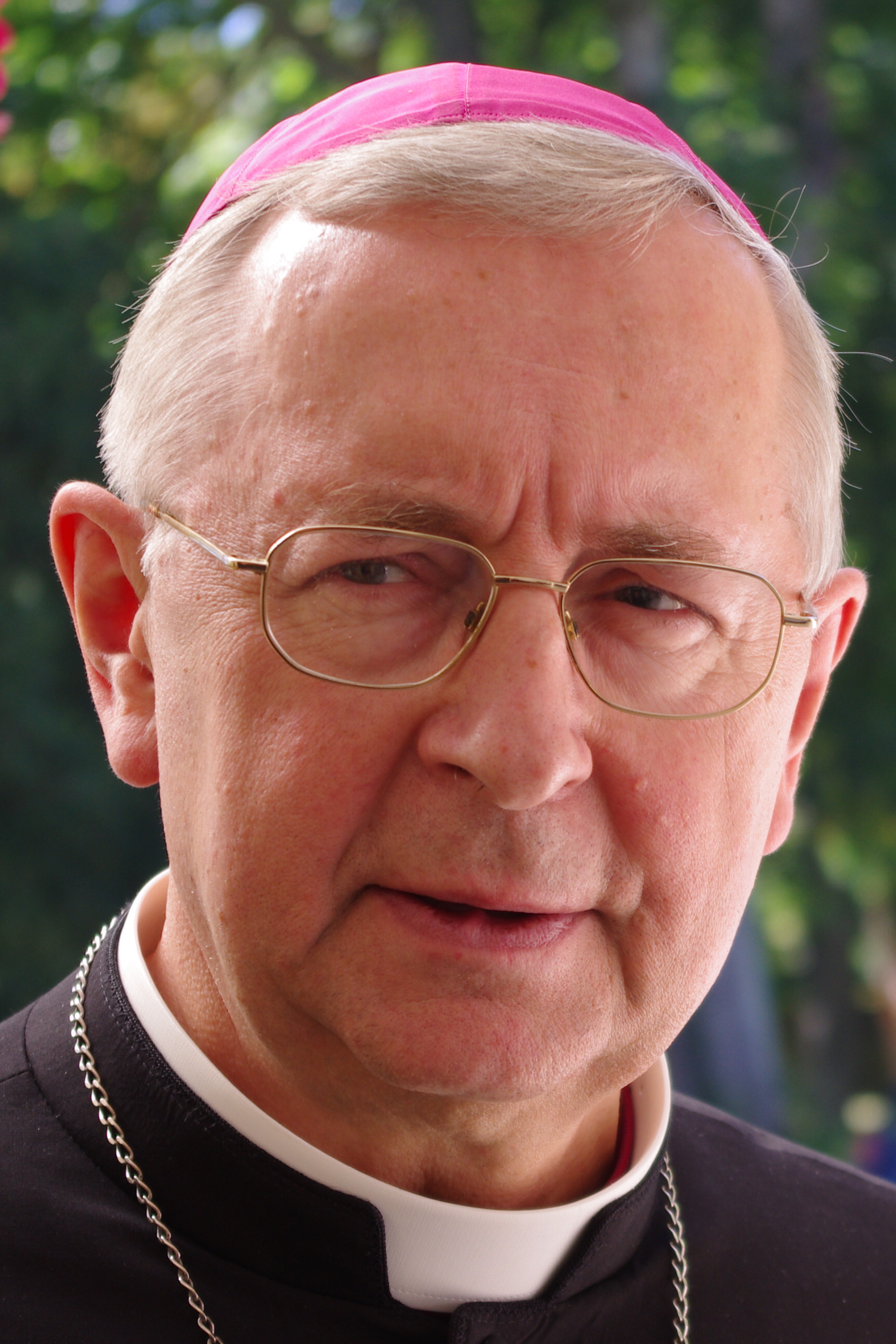
- Gądecki in 2012
- Church: Roman Catholic
- Archdiocese: Poznań
- Installed: 2 April 2002
- Term ended: 19 March 2025
- Predecessor: Juliusz Paetz
- Successor: Zbigniew Zieliński

Orders
- Ordination: 9 June 1973
- Consecration: 25 March 1992

Personal details
- Born: 19 October 1949 (age 76) Strzelno, Poland
- Motto: Czynem i prawdą (In action and truth)
- Coat of arms

Stanisław Gądecki (born 19 October 1949) is a Polish Roman Catholic prelate of the Catholic Church who was Archbishop of Poznań from 2002 to 2025. From 2014 to 2024 he was president of the Polish Episcopal Conference.

== Early life ==
He was born on 19 October 1949 in Strzelno, where he graduated from high school in 1967. From 1967 to 1973, he studied philosophy and theology in the seminary of Gniezno. He was ordained to the priesthood on 9 June 1973 in the Cathedral of Gniezno.

From 1973 to 1981, he studied at the Pontifical Biblical Institute in Rome, earning a bachelor's degree. From 1976 to 1977, he studied at Franciscan Biblical Studies college in Jerusalem. From 1981 to 1982, he studied at the Pontifical University of Saint Thomas Aquinas, where in 1982 he obtained a doctorate in biblical theology.

== Career ==
He was a pastor in the parish of John the Baptist and the deputy rector of the theological seminary in Gniezno. Pope John Paul II appointed him auxiliary bishop of Gniezno and titular bishop of Rubicon on 1 February 1992. He received his episcopal consecration on 25 March.

On 28 March 2002, Pope John Paul II appointed him archbishop of Poznań.

He served as deputy president of the Polish Episcopal Conference from 2004 to 2014 and president from 2014 to 2024.

From 2016 to 2021 he was vice president of the Council of the Bishops' Conferences of Europe.

In October 2015, Gądecki condemned "feelings of false compassion" in relation to a gay-rights campaign in Poland and objected to introducing any changes to the church's approach to LGBT ministry during a meeting of the Synod of Bishops in Rome.

Pope Francis accepted his resignation on 19 March 2025, his 76th birthday.

Religious titles
Preceded by Juliusz Paetz	Archbishop of Poznan; 2002-2025	Succeeded by Zbigniew Zieliński
