= Mario Giordana =

Roman Catholic Archbishop

His Excellency, The Most Reverend Mario Giordana
- Apostolic Nuncio emeritus to Slovakia; Titular Archbishop of Minora
- Church: Roman Catholic Church
- Appointed: 15 March 2008
- Retired: 1 April 2017
- Predecessor: Henryk Józef Nowacki
- Successor: Giacomo Guido Ottonello
- Other post: Titular Archbishop of Minora
- Previous post: Apostolic Nuncio to Haiti (2004-08)

Orders
- Ordination: 25 June 1967 by Egidio Luigi Lanzo
- Consecration: 29 May 2004 by Angelo Sodano, Paolo Romeo and Giuseppe Guerrini

Personal details
- Born: Mario Giordana; 16 January 1942 (age 84) Barge, Cuneo, Italy
- Education: Pontifical Ecclesiastical Academy
- Motto: Duc in altum
- Coat of arms

Styles of Mario Giordana
- Reference style: His Excellency; The Most Reverend
- Spoken style: Your Excellency
- Religious style: Archbishop

Mario Giordana (born 16 January 1942) is an Italian prelate of the Roman Catholic Church who worked in the diplomatic service of the Holy See from 1976 to 2017.

== Biography ==
Mario Giordana was born in Barge, in the Italian province of Cuneo, on 16 January 1942. He was ordained a priest of the Diocese of Saluzzo on 25 June 1967. He earned a doctorate in canon law.

== Diplomatic career ==
He entered the diplomatic service of the Holy See on 8 March 1976 and fulfilled assignments in Indonesia, in the offices of the Secretariat of State, in Switzerland, France, Austria and Italy.

On 27 April 2004, Pope John Paul II appointed him Titular Archbishop of Minora and Apostolic Nuncio to Haiti. He received his episcopal consecration in the Cathedral of Saluzzo on 29 May from Cardinal Angelo Sodano, Secretary of State.

On 15 March 2008, Pope Benedict XVI appointed him Apostolic Nuncio to Slovakia. His term as apostolic nuncio ended with the appointment Giacomo Guido Ottonello on 1 April 2017 to succeed him.

On 4 October 2017, Pope Francis appointed him a member of the Congregation for the Evangelization of Peoples and on 15 December 2018 a member of the Congregation for the Causes of Saints

On 29 June 2020, Pope Francis appointed him Extraordinary Commissioner for the Fabric of Saint Peter to lead a commission to reform its administration.

== See also ==
- List of heads of the diplomatic missions of the Holy See
