= Andrano =

Andrano Griko: Àgios Andrèas
- Comune
- Comune di Andrano
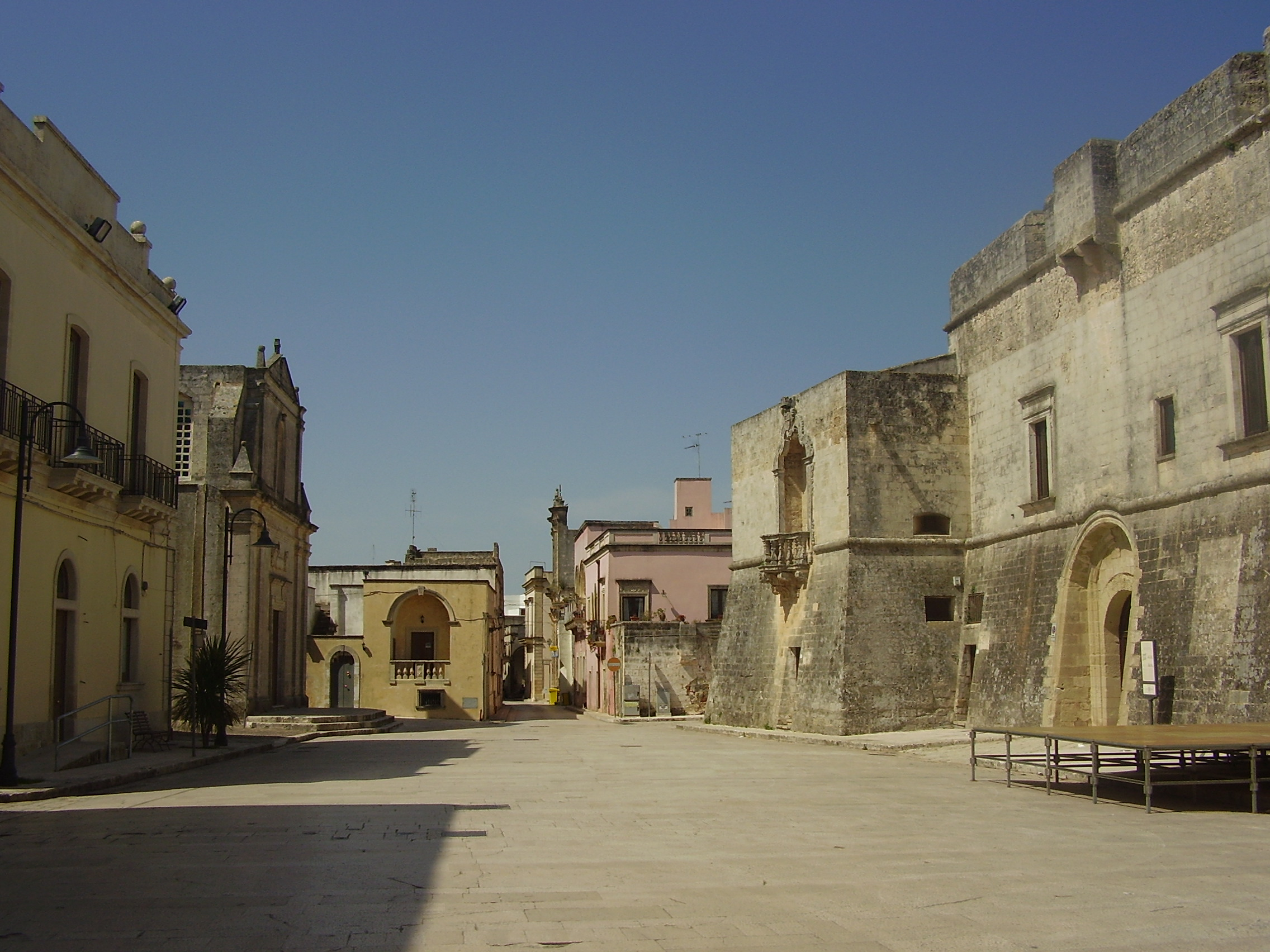

- Location within Italy Location within Apulia
- Coordinates: 39°59′N 18°23′E
- Country: Italy
- Region: Apulia
- Province: Lecce (LE)
- Frazioni: Castiglione d'Otranto, Marina di Andrano

Government
  - Mayor: Salvatore Musarò

Area
  - Total: 15.71 km^{2} (6.07 sq mi)
- Elevation: 111 m (364 ft)

Population (30 April 2017)
  - Total: 4,767
  - Density: 303.4/km^{2} (785.9/sq mi)
- Demonym: Andranesi
- Time zone: UTC+1 (CET)
  - Summer (DST): UTC+2 (CEST)
- Postal code: 73032
- Dialing code: 0836
- ISTAT code: 075005
- Patron saint: St. Andrew the Apostle
- Saint day: 30 November
- Website: Official website

Andrano (Salentino: 'Ndranu) is a town and comune in the province of Lecce in the Apulia region of south-east Italy.

== Main sights ==
- Church of St. Andrew the Apostle
- Church of St. Dominic
- Spinola-Caracciolo castle
