= Camillo Ruini =

Italian Catholic prelate (1931–2026)

His Eminence Camillo Ruini
- Cardinal Vicar of Rome
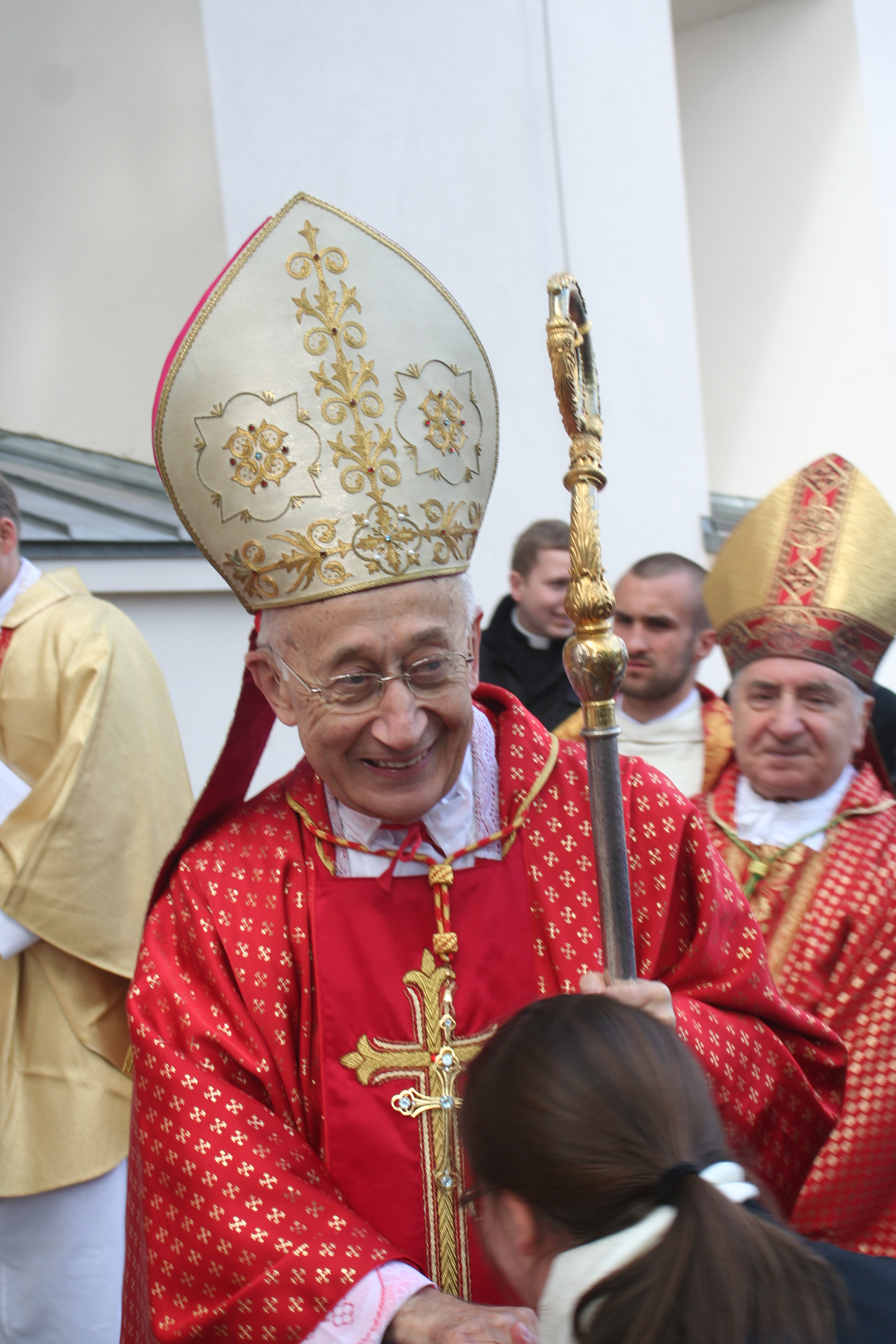
- Cardinal Ruini in 2011
- Church: Catholic
- Predecessor: Ugo Poletti
- Successor: Agostino Vallini
- Other post: Cardinal-Priest of Sant'Agnese fuori le Mura (1991–2026)
- Previous post: Titular Bishop of Nepte (1983–1991); Auxiliary Bishop of Reggio Emilia-Guastalla (1983–1991); Secretary General of the Italian Episcopal Conference (1986–1991); General Ecclesiastical Assistant to Italian Catholic Action (1989–1990); President of the Liturgical Academy (1990–1993); Titular Archbishop of Nepte (1991); Pro-Vicar General of Rome (1991); Pro-Archpriest of the Basilica of Saint John Lateran (1991); President of the Italian Episcopal Conference (1991–2007); Apostolic Administrator of Ostia (1991–2008); Archpriest of the Basilica of Saint John Lateran (1991–2008); President of Peregrinatio ad Petri Sedem (1992–1996); President of Vatican Investigative Commission on Medjugorje (2010–2014)

Orders
- Ordination: 8 December 1954 by Luigi Traglia
- Consecration: 29 June 1983 by Gilberto Baroni
- Created cardinal: 28 June 1991 by John Paul II
- Rank: Cardinal priest

Personal details
- Born: 19 February 1931 Sassuolo, Kingdom of Italy
- Died: 16 June 2026 (aged 95) Rome, Italy
- Denomination: Catholic (Roman Rite)
- Motto: Veritas liberabit nos (Latin for 'The truth will free us')
- Styles
- Reference style: His Eminence
- Spoken style: Your Eminence
- Religious style: Cardinal
- Informal style: Cardinal

Camillo Ruini (Italian pronunciation: [kaˈmillo ruˈiːni]; 19 February 1931 – 16 June 2026) was an Italian prelate of the Catholic Church who was made a cardinal in 1991. He served as president of the Italian Episcopal Conference from 1991 to 2007 and as Vicar General of the Diocese of Rome from 1991 to 2008.

Ruini was very active as a spokesperson for the church and was one of the church officials who most often appeared on Italian television, newspapers, and magazines.

== Biography ==
Ruini was born in Sassuolo, Emilia Romagna, on 19 February 1931. After studying at the Pontifical Gregorian University in Rome, he obtained licentiate degrees in philosophy and in sacred theology. He was ordained to the priesthood on 8 December 1954 by Archbishop Luigi Traglia. He taught philosophy at the diocesan seminary in Emilia Romagna from 1957 to 1968. From 1958 to 1966 he served as chaplain to university students and from 1966 to 1970 he served as a delegate for Catholic Action. From 1968 to 1986, he taught dogmatic theology at the Studio Teologico Interdiocesano of Modena-Reggio Emilia-Carpi-Guastalla, where he was also headmaster from 1968 to 1977.

On 16 May 1983, Pope John Paul II named him auxiliary bishop of Reggio Emilia and titular bishop of Nefta. He was consecrated a bishop by Bishop Gilberto Baroni on 29 June. As vice president of the Preparatory Committee, he contributed to the realization of the Ecclesial Convention of Loreto (1985), which has become a reference point in the dialogue between the church and Italian society following their difficult relationship of the 1960s and 1970s. In June 1986, Pope John Paul named him secretary-general of the Italian Episcopal Conference. From 1988 to 2011 he was a consultor of the Congregation for Bishops.

On 17 January 1991, Ruini was named auxiliary bishop and pro-vicar general for the Diocese of Rome. On 7 March 1991, Pope John Paul II appointed him president of the Italian Episcopal Conference until his resignation on 7 March 2007. He was made Cardinal-Priest of Sant'Agnese fuori le mura on 28 June 1991 and named Vicar General of the Diocese of Rome and archpriest of the Basilica di San Giovanni in Laterano on 1 July 1991. He was also grand chancellor of the Lateran University and the Pontifical John Paul II Institute for Studies on Marriage and Family.

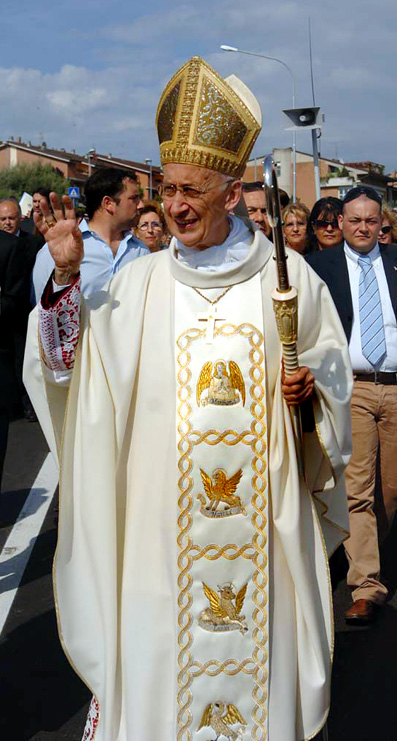
Ruini in 2007

On 29 December 1992, Ruini became president of the Peregrinatio ad Petri Sedem, which promotes pilgrimages to Rome. He remained in this role until 2 May 1996. Ruini was also a member of the Congregation for Bishops, the Pontifical Council for the Laity, the Administration of the Patrimony of the Holy See, and the Council of Cardinals for the Study of Organizational and Economic Affairs of the Holy See. Ruini was one of the cardinal electors who participated in the 2005 papal conclave that elected Pope Benedict XVI.

On 17 March 2010, the Vatican formed a commission to look into the phenomenon of Medjugorje, Bosnia-Herzegovina, where six young people have said they have had visions of the Virgin Mary since the early 1980s. Ruini was its president. In January 2014, the commission submitted its findings to the Congregation for the Doctrine of the Faith.

=== Politics ===
Ruini was seen as a social and political conservative, close to the positions of Popes John Paul II and Benedict XVI. He was very active in the mass media and was the strongest voice of the church against the spring 2005 referendum for the liberalization of Italy's legal restrictions on artificial insemination. He commented on the issue of the 1999 French Pacte civil de solidarité for unmarried couples of the same or opposite sex. In 2007, a bill was proposed in the Italian Senate for a law on civil unions. The bishops' conference opposed this proposal.

=== Retirement and death ===
On 7 March 2007, Pope Benedict XVI named Archbishop Angelo Bagnasco to succeed Ruini as President of the Italian Episcopal Conference. His resignation from his other positions was accepted by Pope Benedict XVI on 27 June 2008, including the position of Vicar General of the Diocese of Rome, in which he was replaced by Cardinal Agostino Vallini. As of 21 June 2013, Ruini was serving as the president of the Scientific Committee of the Ratzinger Foundation.

Ruini was hospitalised for more than a week in July 2024. He had a pacemaker implanted to address a cardiac ischemia. In May 2026, Ruini was reported to be "in critical condition", receiving care and supplemental oxygen at his home.

Ruini died in Rome on 16 June 2026, at the age of 95. His funeral Mass was celebrated at the Altar of the Chair in St. Peter's Basilica on 18 June 2026. The Mass was presided over by Pope Leo XIV. A second funeral service was held on 19 June 2026 in Reggio Emilia, where he was buried.

Catholic Church titles
Preceded by Egidio Caporello	Secretary-General of the Italian Episcopal Conference; 1986–1991	Succeeded by Dionigi Tettamanzi
Preceded by Ugo Poletti	President of the Italian Episcopal Conference; 1991–2007	Succeeded by Angelo Bagnasco
Preceded by Ugo Poletti	Archpriest of the Basilica of St. John Lateran; 1991–2008	Succeeded by Agostino Vallini
Preceded by Ugo Poletti	Vicar General of His Holiness for the Diocese of Rome; 1991–2008	Succeeded by Agostino Vallini
Preceded by Louis-Jean Guyot	Cardinal Priest of Sant'Agnese fuori le mura 1991–2026	Vacant
