= Paolo Rocco Gualtieri =

Italian prelate of the Catholic Church (born 1961)

His Excellency, The Most Reverend Paolo Rocco Gualtieri
- Apostolic Nuncio of Peru; Titular Archbishop of Sagone
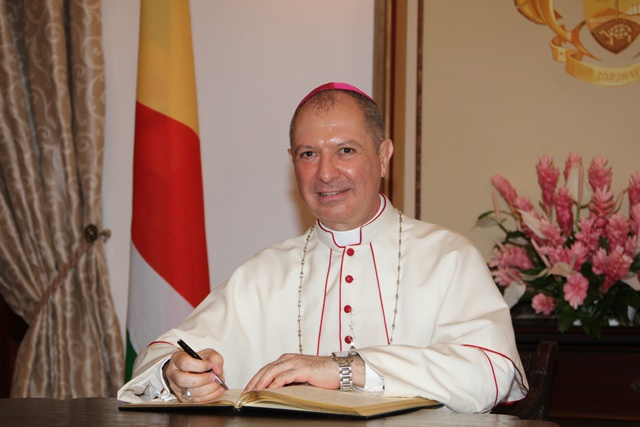
- Mervyn Marie, Seychelles News Agency
- Appointed: 6 August 2022
- Predecessor: Nicola Girasoli
- Other post: Titular Archbishop of Sagone
- Previous post: Apostolic Nuncio of Madagascar, Mauritius, Seychelles and Apostolic Delegate to Comoros (2015-2022)

Orders
- Ordination: 24 September 1988
- Consecration: 30 May 2015 by Pietro Parolin, Paul Gallagher, and Vito Angiuli

Personal details
- Born: 1 February 1961 (age 65) Supersano, Lecce, Italy

Styles of Paolo Rocco Gualtieri
- Reference style: His Excellency; The Most Reverend
- Spoken style: Your Excellency
- Religious style: Archbishop

Paolo Rocco Gualtieri (born 1 February 1961) is an Italian prelate of the Catholic Church who works in the diplomatic service of the Holy See.

== Biography ==
Paolo Rocco Gualtieri was born on 1 February 1961 in Supersano, Province of Lecce, Italy. He was ordained a priest for the Diocese of Ugento-Santa Maria di Leuca on 24 September 1988.

== Diplomatic career ==
On 13 April 2015, Pope Francis appointed him titular archbishop of Sagone and Apostolic Nuncio to Madagascar. He received his episcopal consecration from Cardinal Pietro Parolin on May 30.

Pope Francis added to his responsibilities in the course of the year, naming him Apostolic Nuncio to the Seychelles on 26 September, Apostolic Nuncio to Mauritius on 24 October, and Apostolic Delegate to the Comoros with similar responsibility for Réunion as well on 13 November.

On 6 August 2022, Pope Francis appointed him as Apostolic Nuncio to Peru.

== See also ==
- List of heads of the diplomatic missions of the Holy See

Catholic Church titles
Preceded by Dominique Mamberti	— TITULAR — Archbishop of Sagone; 13 April 2015 – present	Succeeded by Incumbent
