= Apostolic Nunciature to Mauritius =

Diplomatic post of the Holy See

The Apostolic Nunciature to Mauritius represents the interests of the Holy See to officials of the Catholic Church, civil society, and government offices in Mauritius. The position of Apostolic Delegate is a diplomatic one, held by a member of the diplomatic service of the Holy See. He has the rank of ambassador. The post of Nuncio to Mauritius is held by the Apostolic Nuncio to Madagascar and resides in Antananarivo.

On 9 March 1970, Pope Paul VI established the Nunciature to Mauritius seated in Antananarivo.

== Papal representatives to Mauritius ==
Apostolic Pro-Nuncios

- Michele Cecchini (9 March 1970 - 18 June 1976)
- Sergio Sebastiani (24 November 1976 - 8 January 1985)
- Agostino Marchetto (31 August 1985 - 7 December 1990)
- Blasco Francisco Collaço (28 February 1991 - 13 April 1996)

Apostolic Nuncios

- Adriano Bernardini (15 June 1996 - 24 July 1999)
- Bruno Musarò (25 September 1999 - 10 February 2004)
- Augustine Kasujja (9 June 2004 - 2 February 2010)
- Eugene Martin Nugent (13 March 2010 - 10 January 2015)
- Paolo Rocco Gualtieri (24 October 2015 – 6 August 2022)
- Tomasz Grysa (21 March 2023 – 14 May 2026)
