= Giuseppe Burzio =

Giuseppe Burzio (1901-1966), born Cambiano, Italy, was a Vatican diplomat and Roman Catholic Archbishop.

Ordained in 1924, he enrolled in the Pontifical Ecclesiastical Academy Class of 1926 and was commissioned into the diplomatic service of the Holy See in 1929 when he was sent to Peru as a Secretary 2nd class. Later he served in Czechoslovakia (1935–38, as auditor) and Lithuania (1938–40, as Chargé d'affaires) before being posted to Slovakia in 1940 as Chargé d'affaires before the Slovak regime of Jozef Tiso. Pope Pius XII appointed the 39-year-old Burzio to bring pressure to bear on the Slovak government. Burzio advised Rome of the deteriorating situation for Jews in the Nazi puppet state, sparking Vatican protests on behalf of Jews. Burzio also lobbied the Slovak government directly.

In 1942 Burzio and others reported to Tiso that the Germans were murdering Slovakia's deported Jews. Tiso hesitated and then refused to deport Slovakia's 24,000 remaining Jews. When the transportation began again in 1943, Burzio challenged Prime Minister Tuka over the extermination of Slovak Jews. The Vatican condemned the renewal of the deportations on 5 May and the Slovak episcopate issued a pastoral letter condemning totalitarianism and antisemitism on 8 May 1943. In August 1944, the Slovak National Uprising rose against the People's Party regime. German troops were sent to quell the rebellion and with them came security police charged with rounding up Slovakia's remaining Jews. Burzio begged Tiso directly to at least spare Catholic Jews from transportation and delivered an admonition from the Pope: "the injustice wrought by his government is harmful to the prestige of his country and enemies will exploit it to discredit clergy and the Church the world over.”

Following the war, he was ordained Titular Archbishop of Gortyna in 1946. He was appointed Apostolic Nuncio to Bolivia in 1946, and to Cuba in 1950 and resigned the position in 1955.

== See also ==
- Catholic Church and Nazi Germany
- Pope Pius XII and the Holocaust
- The Holocaust
