= Agostino Marchetto =

Italian prelate of the Catholic Church (born 1940)

His Eminence Agostino Marchetto
- Cardinal; Secretary Emeritus of the Pontifical Council for the Pastoral Care of Migrants and Itinerant People
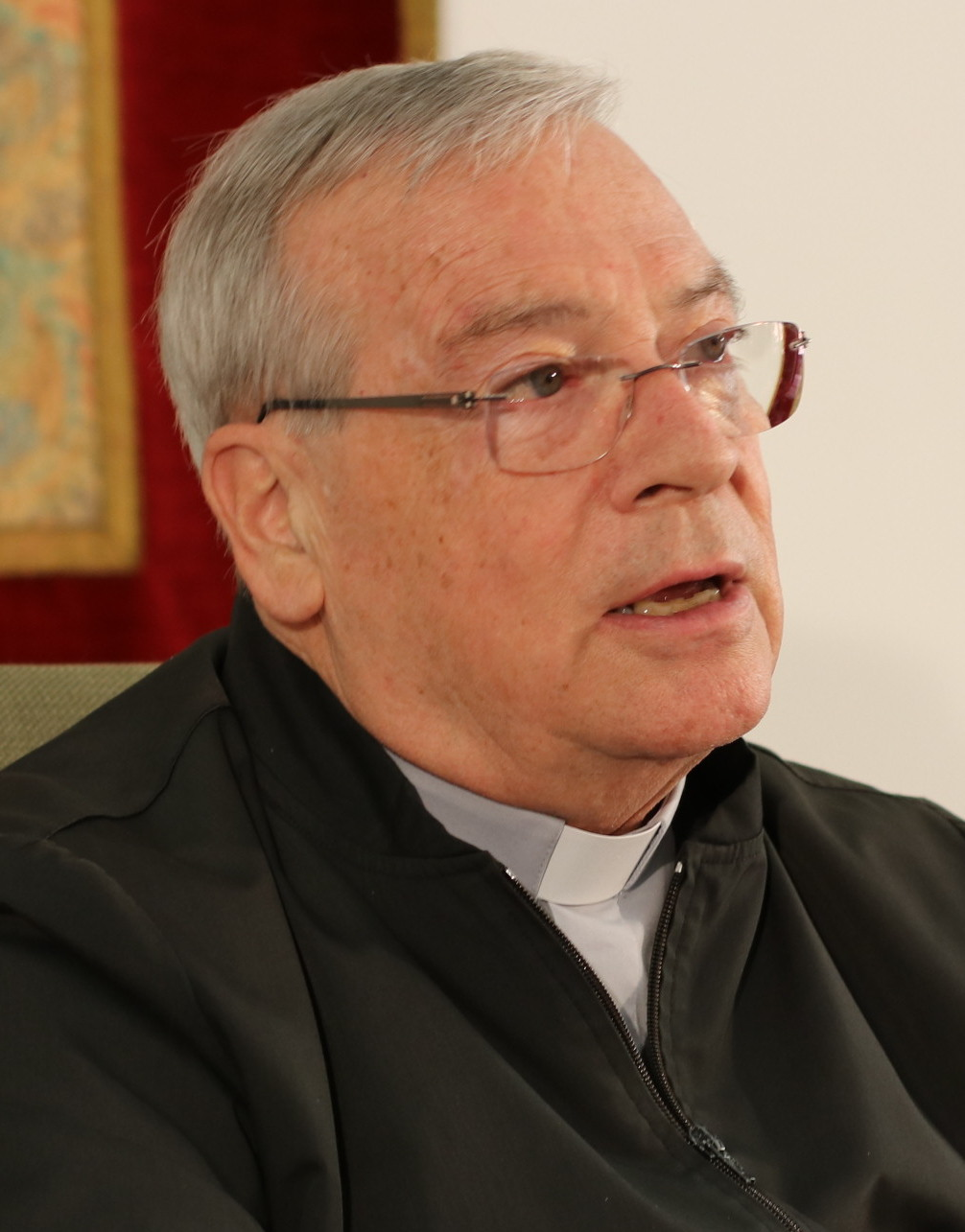
- Marchetto in 2018
- Church: Roman Catholic Church
- Appointed: 6 November 2001
- Term ended: 25 August 2010
- Predecessor: Francesco Gioia
- Successor: Joseph Kalathiparambil
- Other post: Cardinal Deacon of Santa Maria Goretti (2023-)
- Previous posts: Apostolic Pro-Nuncio to Madagascar (1985-90); Apostolic Pro-Nuncio to Mauritius (1985-90); Apostolic Pro-Nuncio to Tanzania (1990-94); Apostolic Nuncio to Belarus (1994-96); Permanent Observer to the Food and Agricultural Organization of the United Nations (1999-2001); Titular Archbishop of Écija (1985-2023)

Orders
- Ordination: 28 June 1964 by Carlo Zinato
- Consecration: 1 November 1985 by Sebastiano Baggio
- Created cardinal: 30 September 2023 by Pope Francis
- Rank: Cardinal-Deacon

Personal details
- Born: Agostino Marchetto; 28 August 1940 (age 86) Vicenza, Kingdom of Italy
- Education: Pontifical Ecclesiastical Academy
- Motto: In patientia cum gaudio
- Coat of arms

Agostino Marchetto (born 28 August 1940) is an Italian prelate of the Catholic Church who worked in the diplomatic service of the Holy See from 1968 to 1999 and then in the Roman Curia until his retirement in 2010. He is regarded as one of the principal historians of the Second Vatican Council.

Pope Francis made him a cardinal on 30 September 2023.

== Early career and diplomacy ==
Agostino Marchetto was born in Vicenza, Italy, on 28 August 1940. He was ordained a priest of the Diocese of Vicenza on 28 June 1964.

To prepare for a diplomatic career he entered the Pontifical Ecclesiastical Academy in 1964. He entered the diplomatic service of the Holy See in 1968 and worked in the offices of the papal representative to Zambia, Cuba, Algeria, Portugal, and Mozambique.

On 31 August 1985, Pope John Paul II appointed him titular archbishop of Astigi and Apostolic Pro-Nuncio to both Madagascar and Mauritius. He received his episcopal consecration on 1 November 1985 from Cardinal Sebastiano Baggio. On 7 December 1990, Pope John Paul named him Apostolic Pro-Nuncio to Tanzania. On 18 May 1994, Pope John Paul named him Apostolic Nuncio to Belarus. He took up a position in the offices of the Secretariat of State in Rome on 16 April 1996.

On 8 July 1999, Pope John Paul appointed him Permanent Observer of the Holy See to the international food and agriculture organizations based in Rome: FAO, IFAD, PAM, and CMA.

== Curial official ==
On 6 November 2001, he was named Secretary of the Pontifical Council for the Pastoral Care of Migrants and Itinerants.

In that role he frequently commented on current issues in language calculated to draw headlines. In 2006, Marchetto tied the World Cup in Germany to human trafficking for prostitution, giving “some 'red cards' ... to this industry, to its clients", and the host country. In 2007, he called homelessness a "global pandemic" that merits a global response on the scale of to HIV/AIDS. In 2009, he criticized the Berlusconi government of Italy for repatriating Libyans intercepted at sea. He objected to a new Italian immigration law that made clandestine movement a criminal offense, calling that feature the law's "original sin". He denounced the Sarkozy government in France for expelling Roma people en masse, assigning collective guilt and ignoring individual responsibility.

He resigned his curial position on 25 August 2010.

On 9 July 2023, Pope Francis announced he plans to make him a cardinal at a consistory scheduled for 30 September. At that consistory he was made cardinal deacon of Santa Maria Goretti.

== Historian of the Second Vatican Council ==
Marchetto is a prominent interpreter of the Second Vatican Council and has been described by Pope Francis as "the best hermeneutician of the Second Vatican Council".

== See also ==
- Cardinals created by Francis
