= Apostolic Nunciature to Serbia =

Diplomatic mission of the Holy See in Europe

The Apostolic Nunciature to Serbia is an ecclesiastical office of the Catholic Church in Serbia. It is a diplomatic post of the Holy See, whose representative is called the Apostolic Nuncio with the rank of an ambassador.

On 3 June 2006, Serbia and Montenegro became independent nations, dissolving their short-lived federation, the State Union of Serbia and Montenegro, the successor state to the Federal Republic of Yugoslavia. The Nunciature to Yugoslavia was based in Belgrade, capital of the new nation of Serbia.

== List of papal representatives to Serbia ==
Apostolic Nuncios to Yugoslavia

- Eugenio Sbarbaro (26 April 2000 – 8 August 2009)
  - Apostolic Nuncio to Serbia as of 3 June 2006

Apostolic Nuncios to Serbia

- Orlando Antonini (8 August 2009 – 30 September 2015)
- Luciano Suriani (7 December 2015 – 13 May 2022)
- Santo Gangemi (12 September 2022 – present)

== See also ==
- Apostolic Nunciature to Montenegro
- Apostolic Nunciature to Yugoslavia
