= Ettore Felici =

Italian nuncio

His Excellency Ettore Felici
- Apostolic Nuncio to Ireland; Titular Latin Archbishopric of Corinth
- Appointed: 1946
- Predecessor: Paschal Charles Robinson OFM
- Successor: Gerald Patrick O'Hara
- Previous post: Apostolic Nuncio to Yugoslavia,

Orders
- Ordination: 20 September 1903
- Consecration: 30 December 1928 by Cardinal Masella

Personal details
- Born: Ettore Felici; 4 March 1881 Segni, Italy
- Died: 9 April 1951 (aged 70) Dublin, Ireland
- Buried: St Mary's Pro-Cathedral

Styles of Ettore Felici
- Reference style: The Most Reverend
- Spoken style: Your Excellency
- Religious style: Monsignor
- Posthumous style: not applicable

Ettore Felici (4 March 1881, Segni – 9 May 1951) was the second Apostolic Nuncio to Ireland.

== Early life ==
Born in Segni on 4 March 1881, Felici was ordained priest in 1903, he began his diplomatic career as a minor official at the Apostolic Nunciature to Serbia in Belgrade. Here he assumed much greater responsibility after Serbia was plunged into war in 1914. As a majority Serbian Orthodox Church at war with Catholic Austria relations were often tense. After the country was occupied by German troops Felici also occupied his time with relief works. He remained at the nunciature in Belgrade after the war when Serbia became part of the Kingdom of Yugoslavia.

From 1921 to 1923 he was in the Vatican.

In 1927 he was consecrated titular archbishop of Corinth and named Apostolic Nuncio to Chile.

In 1938, he returned to Yugoslavia as Nuncio. In April 1941 he was in Belgrade when the Luftwaffe bombed the city before the Axis invasion (Operation retribution) after a coup against the government that entered a pact with the Axis. Due to the military situation, he was recalled to the Vatican and spent the remainder of the war working in the Secretariat of State.

On 2 September 1949, Felici was appointed Nuncio to Ireland. After a brief illness he died on 9 May 1951, and his body was interred in the crypt of Dublin's pro-cathedral.
