= List of Filipino apostolic nuncios =

Since 1990, five Filipinos have been appointed as diplomatic representatives of the Holy See to various countries and international organizations. This list includes both incumbent and retired Filipino prelates who serve or have served as apostolic nuncios, the Vatican equivalent of an ambassador. It also details their previous assignments holding other senior ranks within the Vatican's foreign service, such as apostolic delegates, permanent observers, and chargé d'affaires.

The first Filipino to be appointed an apostolic nuncio was Archbishop Osvaldo Padilla, who was named to the post in December 1990 by Pope John Paul II.

== Incumbent nuncios ==
Name	Titular see	Current post	Previous posts			Ref.
Name	Titular see	Current post	Country	Start date	End date	Ref.
Francisco Montecillo Padilla	Nebbio (since April 1, 2006)	Guatemala (since April 17, 2020)	Papua New Guinea	April 1, 2006	November 10, 2011	
Francisco Montecillo Padilla	Nebbio (since April 1, 2006)	Guatemala (since April 17, 2020)	Solomon Islands	April 1, 2006	November 10, 2011	
Francisco Montecillo Padilla	Nebbio (since April 1, 2006)	Guatemala (since April 17, 2020)	Tanzania	November 10, 2011	April 5, 2016	
Francisco Montecillo Padilla	Nebbio (since April 1, 2006)	Guatemala (since April 17, 2020)	Kuwait	April 5, 2016	April 17, 2020	
Francisco Montecillo Padilla	Nebbio (since April 1, 2006)	Guatemala (since April 17, 2020)	Arabian Peninsula (Note: As apostolic delegate)	April 5, 2016	April 17, 2020	
Francisco Montecillo Padilla	Nebbio (since April 1, 2006)	Guatemala (since April 17, 2020)	Bahrain	April 26, 2016	April 17, 2020	
Francisco Montecillo Padilla	Nebbio (since April 1, 2006)	Guatemala (since April 17, 2020)	United Arab Emirates	April 26, 2016	April 17, 2020	
Francisco Montecillo Padilla	Nebbio (since April 1, 2006)	Guatemala (since April 17, 2020)	Yemen	July 30, 2016	April 17, 2020	
Francisco Montecillo Padilla	Nebbio (since April 1, 2006)	Guatemala (since April 17, 2020)	Qatar	May 6, 2017	April 17, 2020	
Bernardito Auza	Suacia (since May 8, 2008)	European Union (since March 22, 2025)	Haiti	May 8, 2008	July 1, 2014	
Bernardito Auza	Suacia (since May 8, 2008)	European Union (since March 22, 2025)	United Nations (Note: As permanent observer)	July 1, 2014	October 1, 2019	
Bernardito Auza	Suacia (since May 8, 2008)	European Union (since March 22, 2025)	Organization of American States	July 16, 2014	August 31, 2019	
Bernardito Auza	Suacia (since May 8, 2008)	European Union (since March 22, 2025)	Andorra	October 1, 2019	March 22, 2025	
Bernardito Auza	Suacia (since May 8, 2008)	European Union (since March 22, 2025)	Spain	October 1, 2019	March 22, 2025	
Arnaldo Catalan	Apollonia (since January 31, 2022)	Rwanda (since January 31, 2022)	China (Note: As chargé d'affaires, an ad interim diplomat)	August 10, 2018	January 31, 2022	

== Retired nuncios ==
Name	Titular see	Previous post(s)	Start date	End date	Ref.
Osvaldo Padilla	Pia (since December 17, 1990)	Panama	December 17, 1990	1994	
Osvaldo Padilla	Pia (since December 17, 1990)	Sri Lanka	1994	August 22, 1998	
Osvaldo Padilla	Pia (since December 17, 1990)	Nigeria	August 22, 1998	July 31, 2003	
Osvaldo Padilla	Pia (since December 17, 1990)	Costa Rica	July 31, 2003	April 12, 2008	
Osvaldo Padilla	Pia (since December 17, 1990)	Korea (Note: Although based in South Korea, the Vatican only uses "Korea" in appointments to the nunciature.)	April 12, 2008	September 15, 2017	
Osvaldo Padilla	Pia (since December 17, 1990)	Mongolia	April 26, 2008	September 15, 2017	
Adolfo Tito Yllana	Montecorvino (since December 13, 2001)	China	September 20, 1999	December 13, 2001	
Adolfo Tito Yllana	Montecorvino (since December 13, 2001)	Papua New Guinea	December 13, 2001	March 31, 2006	
Adolfo Tito Yllana	Montecorvino (since December 13, 2001)	Solomon Islands	February 5, 2002	March 31, 2006	
Adolfo Tito Yllana	Montecorvino (since December 13, 2001)	Pakistan	March 31, 2006	November 20, 2010	
Adolfo Tito Yllana	Montecorvino (since December 13, 2001)	Congo	November 20, 2010	February 17, 2015	
Adolfo Tito Yllana	Montecorvino (since December 13, 2001)	Australia	February 17, 2015	June 3, 2021	
Adolfo Tito Yllana	Montecorvino (since December 13, 2001)	Cyprus	June 3, 2021	February 17, 2023	
Adolfo Tito Yllana	Montecorvino (since December 13, 2001)	Israel	June 3, 2021	January 22, 2026	
Adolfo Tito Yllana	Montecorvino (since December 13, 2001)	Jerusalem and Palestine	June 3, 2021	January 22, 2026	

== See also ==
- Catholic Church in the Philippines
- List of Roman Catholic archdioceses
- List of Roman Catholic dioceses
