= Holy See–United Arab Emirates relations =

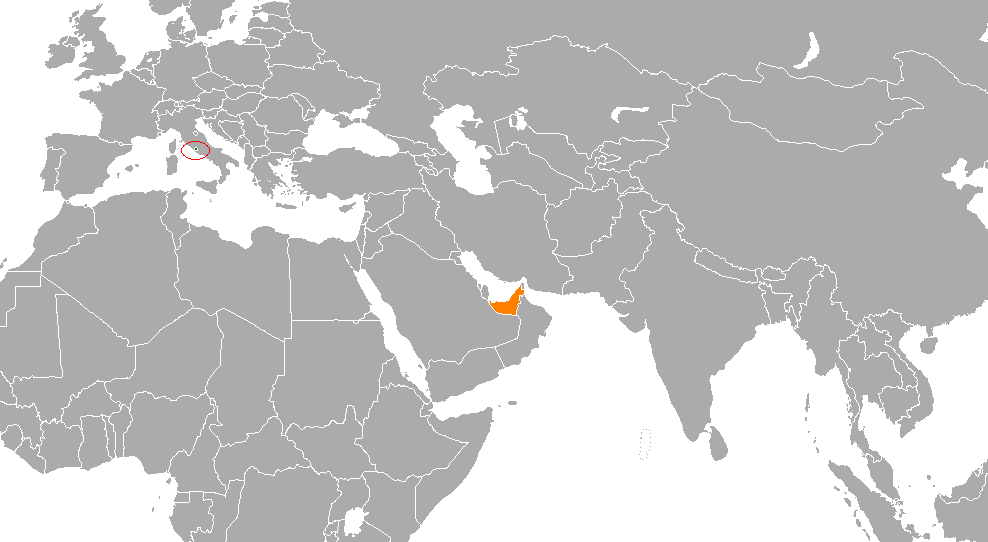

- Holy See: United Arab Emirates

Holy See–United Arab Emirates relations are the foreign relations between the Holy See and the United Arab Emirates (UAE). The earliest form of contact between officials of both states was when the founder of the UAE, Sheikh Zayed bin Sultan Al Nahyan, unofficially met Pope John Paul II in the 1980s. Relations between the two were not established until 31 May 2007. According to a Vatican communiqué, the diplomatic arrangement was founded on a desire to promote “bonds of mutual friendship and of strengthening international cooperation.

In February 2019, Pope Francis became the first Pope in history to visit and perform papal mass in the Arabian Peninsula, during his visit to Abu Dhabi.

== Background ==
Ties between the UAE and the Holy See are largely influenced and symbolised by historical Christian-Muslim relations. As a Muslim country, the setting up of the UAE's relations with the Holy See at an ambassadorial level were seen by many as a boost to the Christian population of the UAE, which numbers around one million people. The Holy See maintains that its connections with the UAE are fundamentally shaped by the country's values of religious freedom as well as its maintaining of cordial relations with the Catholic Church and the approving of building new centers of worship.

In 2008 the UAE sent a delegation led by Abdul Aziz Al Ghurair to meet the pope in what was the highest-level visit to the Vatican by Emirati officials since the time when links were commenced. Speaking on the occasion, Ghurair remarked that the UAE wanted to establish a strong relationship with the Vatican and enhance civil and religious contacts. “We expect this relationship to materialise soon,” he added. Pope Benedict XVI mentioned that he respected the efforts of the UAE's leaders in promoting tolerance; in addition, the Vatican secretary of state Cardinal Tarcisio Bertone described the UAE as a model for co-existence among various religions, adding that dialogue between faiths was possible and that extremists only constituted a limited number of followers of religious faiths.

In Abu Dhabi, the Centre for Information Affairs once organised a symposium with the theme "The Role of the Vatican in Spreading the Principles of Coexistence in the World and the Religious Tolerance in the United Arab Emirates." The forum, which included key speakers such as Paul-Mounged El-Hachem and Bishop Paul Hinder, sought to encourage dialogue about the friendship between the two states and the role of religion in society.

In May 2010, the UAE appointed its first woman ambassador to the Vatican, Hissa Abdulla Ahmed Al-Otaiba. Since 2016, Archbishop Francisco Montecillo Padilla has been the Vatican's nuncio to the UAE.

== Papal visit ==
In June 2016, the Pope received and accepted an invitation to visit the United Arab Emirates and the Holy See sent a letter to the nation's officials confirming a visit would take place at some point in the future. It was confirmed on December 6, 2018, that the Pope would visit the United Arab Emirates in order to participate in the International Interfaith Meeting on "Human Fraternity" in Abu Dhabi.

On February 3, 2019, Pope Francis landed in the Abu Dhabi Presidential Airport at 9.47 p.m. local time where he was greeted by Sheikh Mohamed bin Zayed, Crown Prince of Abu Dhabi and Deputy Supreme Commander of the UAE Armed Forces and then Dr. Ahmed el-Tayeb, Grand Imam of Al Azhar University, which serves as the lead source for Sunni Islam education, and Chairman of the Muslim Council of Elders. This visit also makes him the first Pope to visit an area in the Arabian Peninsula. On February 4, the Pope attended the Interfaith Meeting, during which he and el-Tayeb signed “A Document on Human Fraternity for World Peace and Living Together.” The same day, The Pope spoke at the Abu Dhabi Founder's Memorial, held a meeting with el-Tayeb and other Muslim elders at the Sheikh Zayed Grand Mosque, and held a meeting with Crown Prince Zayed at the Presidential Palace. On February 5, Pope Francis concluded his trip after giving a mass in front of a large crowd, estimated at 180,000, at Zayed Sports City.

== Apostolic Nuncios to the United Arab Emirates ==
- Archbishop Paul-Mounged El-Hachem (4 August 2007 – 2 December 2009)
- Archbishop Petar Rajič (27 March 2010 – 15 June 2015)
- Archbishop Francisco Montecillo Padilla (26 April 2016 -17 April 2020)

== See also ==
- Christianity in the United Arab Emirates
- Apostolic Nunciature to United Arab Emirates
