= Giovanni Battista Morandini =

Italian prelate of the Catholic Church (1937–2024)

His Excellency, The Most Reverend Giovanni Battista Morandini
- Apostolic Nuncio emeritus of Syria; Titular Archbishop of Numida
- Appointed: 6 March 2004
- Retired: 21 September 2008
- Predecessor: Diego Causero
- Successor: Mario Zenari
- Other post: Titular Archbishop of Numida (1983–2024)
- Previous posts: Apostolic Nuncio of South Korea and Mongolia (1997–2004); Apostolic Nuncio of Guatemala (1990–1997); Apostolic Nuncio of Rwanda (1983–1990)

Orders
- Ordination: 22 July 1962
- Consecration: 8 October 1983 by Agostino Casaroli, Bernardin Gantin, and Eugênio Sales

Personal details
- Born: 30 June 1937 Bienno, Italy
- Died: 21 October 2024 (aged 87) Bienno, Italy

Styles of Giovanni Battista Morandini
- Reference style: His Excellency; The Most Reverend
- Spoken style: Your Excellency
- Religious style: Archbishop

Giovanni Battista Morandini (30 June 1937 – 21 October 2024) was an Italian prelate of the Catholic Church who spent his career in the diplomatic service of the Holy See. He became an archbishop in 1983 and from then until his retirement in 2008 served terms as Apostolic Nuncio to Rwanda, Guatemala, Korea, Mongolia, and Syria.

== Early life ==
Giovanni Battista Morandini was born in Bienno on 30 June 1937. He was ordained a priest on 22 July 1962 and went immediately to Rome to complete his studies.

== Diplomatic career ==
Morandini entered the diplomatic service of the Holy See in 1966. His first posting was in Bolivia from 1966 to 1970, followed by stints in Belgium and Brazil. From 1979 to 1983 he worked in Rome at the Section for Relations with States of the Secretariat of State. While serving in that last post he was reported to have told the family of Emanuela Orlandi, a teenager who disappeared in Rome on 22 June 1983, that the Vatican wanted to minimize publicity in the case, a remark that has fueled the family’s belief of Vatican involvement in closing the investigation into her disappearance.

On 30 August 1983, Pope John Paul II named him titular archbishop of Numida and Apostolic Nuncio to Rwanda.

He received his episcopal consecration from Cardinal Agostino Casaroli on 8 October 1983.

John Paul appointed him Nuncio to Guatemala on 12 September 1990, to both Korea and Mongolia on 23 April 1997, and to Syria on 6 March 2004.

== Later life and death ==
Morandini retired on 21 September 2008. He died in Bienno on 21 October 2024, at the age of 87.

== See also ==
- List of heads of the diplomatic missions of the Holy See

Catholic Church titles
Preceded by Mario Pio Gaspari	Titular Archbishop of Numidia; 1983–2024	Succeeded by Vacant
Preceded by Diego Causero	Apostolic Nuncio to Syria; 2004–2008	Succeeded by Mario Zenari
Preceded by John Bulaitis	Apostolic Nuncio to Mongolia; 1997–2004	Succeeded by Emil Paul Tscherrig
Preceded by John Bulaitis	Apostolic Nuncio to Korea; 1997–2004	Succeeded by Emil Paul Tscherrig
Preceded by Oriano Quilici	Apostolic Nuncio to Guatemala; 1990–1997	Succeeded by Ramiro Moliner Inglés
Preceded by Thomas Anthony White	Apostolic Nuncio to Rwanda; 1983–1990	Succeeded by Giuseppe Bertello
