= Apostolic Nunciature to Kuwait =

Diplomatic post of the Holy See

The Apostolic Nunciature to Kuwait is an ecclesiastical office of the Catholic Church in Kuwait. It is a diplomatic post of the Holy See, whose representative is called the Apostolic Nuncio with the rank of an ambassador. The Apostolic Nuncio to Kuwait is usually also the Apostolic Nuncio to Bahrain, Qatar, Yemen and Apostolic Delegate to the Arabian Peninsula upon his appointment to said nations.

== List of papal representatives ==
Apostolic Pro-Nuncios

- Alfredo Bruniera (7 July 1969 – 4 March 1975)
- Jean-Édouard-Lucien Rupp (4 March 1975 - 13 July 1978)
- Antonio del Giudice (22 December 1978 - 20 August 1982)
- Luigi Conti (19 November 1983 - 17 January 1987)
- Marian Oleś (28 November 1987 - 1991)

Apostolic Nuncios

- Pablo Puente Buces (25 May 1993 - 31 July 1997)
- Antonio Maria Vegliò (2 October 1997 - 13 December 1999)
- Giuseppe De Andrea (28 June 2001 - 27 August 2005)
- Paul-Mounged El-Hachem (27 August 2005 - 2 December 2009)
- Petar Rajič (2 December 2009 - 15 June 2015)
- Francisco Montecillo Padilla (5 April 2016 – 17 April 2020)
- Eugene Nugent (7 January 2021 – 25 May 2026)

== See also ==
- Apostolic Delegation to the Arabian Peninsula
- Nunciature website
