= Kryspin Witold Dubiel =

His Excellency, The Most Reverend Kryspin Witold Dubiel
- Apostolic Nuncio to Angola and São Tomé and Príncipe; Titular Archbishop of Vannida
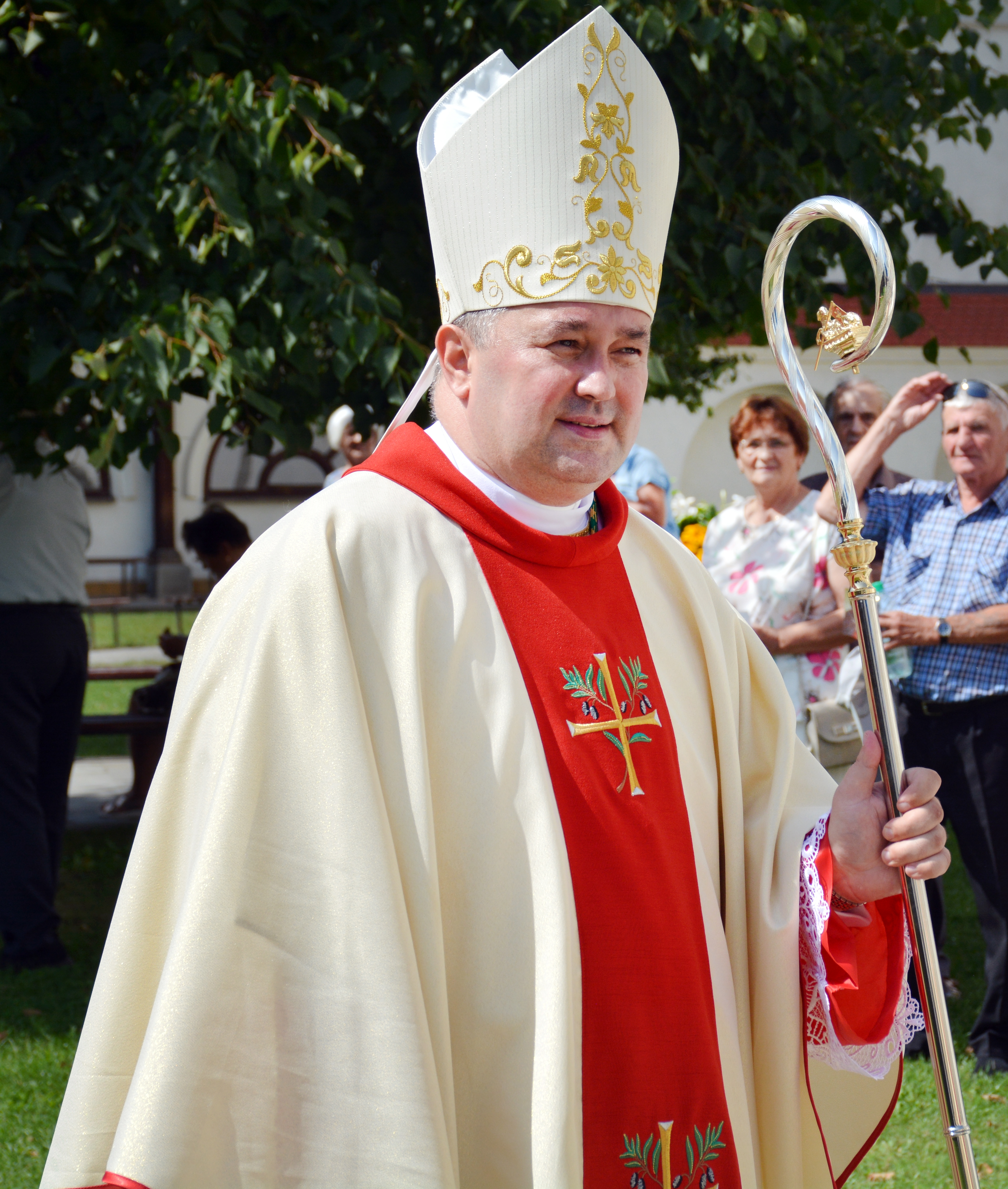
- Appointed: 1 July 2024
- Predecessor: Giovanni Gaspari
- Other post: Titular Archbishop of Vannida

Orders
- Ordination: 31 March 1998 by Józef Michalik
- Consecration: 24 August 2024 by Pietro Parolin, Salvatore Pennacchio, and Adam Szal

Personal details
- Born: 12 November 1973 (age 52) Nowa Sarzyna, Poland
- Motto: PATIENTIA ET FIDES SANCTORUM (Patience and Faith of the Saints)
- Coat of arms

Styles of Kryspin Witold Dubiel
- Reference style: His Excellency; The Most Reverend
- Spoken style: Your Excellency
- Religious style: Archbishop

Kryspin Witold Dubiel (born 12 November 1973) is a Polish prelate of the Catholic Church who works in the diplomatic service of the Holy See. He is currently the Apostolic Nuncio to Angola and São Tomé and Príncipe, and also the Titular Archbishop of Vannida.

== Biography ==
Kryspin Witold Dubiel was born on 12 November 1973 in Nowa Sarzyna, Poland. He was ordained a priest for the Roman Catholic Archdiocese of Przemyśl on 31 March 1998.

He is a graduate of Canon Law. Dubiel has a knowledge of French, Italian, Russian and Spanish.

== Diplomatic career ==
1 July 2004, he entered the diplomatic service of the Holy See and has worked for the Nunciatures of Rwanda, Belarus, Colombia, the Philippines, Poland, Slovenia and the United Arab Emirates.

On 1 July 2024, Pope Francis appointed him Titular Archbishop of Vannida and Apostolic Nuncio to Angola. On 15 July 2024, he was also given the responsibilities for São Tomé and Príncipe. On 24 August 2024, he was consecrated as an archbishop.

== See also ==
- List of heads of the diplomatic missions of the Holy See
