= Apostolic Nunciature to Angola =

Diplomatic Mission of the Holy See

- Address: Rua Luther King 123 CP 1030 Luanda, Angola
- Coordinates: 8.82162°S 13.23675°E
- Apostolic Nuncio: Kryspin Witold Dubiel

The Apostolic Nunciature to Angola is an ecclesiastical office of the Roman Catholic Church in Angola. It is a diplomatic post of the Holy See, whose representative is called the Apostolic Nuncio with the rank of an ambassador. The Holy See has full diplomatic ties with Angola as well as most other countries.

The Apostolic Nuncio to Angola is usually also the Apostolic Nuncio to São Tomé and Príncipe upon his appointment to said nation.

== Nuncios ==
- Giovanni De Andrea (14 April 1975 - 26 January 1983)
- Fortunato Baldelli (12 February 1983 - 20 April 1991)
- Félix del Blanco Prieto (31 May 1991 - 4 May 1996)
- Aldo Cavalli (2 July 1996 - 28 June 2001)
- Giovanni Angelo Becciu (15 October 2001 - 23 July 2009)
- Novatus Rugambwa (20 February 2010 - 5 March 2015)
- Petar Rajič (15 June 2015 – 15 June 2019)
- Giovanni Gaspari (21 September 2020 – 2 March 2024)
- Kryspin Witold Dubiel (1 July 2024 – present)

== See also ==
- Apostolic Nunciature
- Foreign relations of the Holy See
- List of diplomatic missions of the Holy See
- Roman Catholicism in Angola
