= Maronite Catholic Eparchy of Baalbek-Deir El Ahmar =

Eastern Catholic eparchy in Lebanon

Coordinates: 34.1260°N 36.1335°E

Eparchy of Baalbek-Deir El Ahmar (Maronite) Eparchia Helipolitana-Rubrimonasteriensis Maronitarum

Location
- Country: Lebanon
- Metropolitan: Immediately subject to the Maronite Patriarch of Antioch

Statistics
- Population: (as of 2012); 45,000 (n/a%)
- Parishes: 34

Information
- Sui iuris church: Maronite
- Rite: West Syro-Antiochene Rite
- Established: 9 June 1990
- Cathedral: Saint George Cathedral

Current leadership
- Pope: Leo XIV
- Patriarch: Bechara Boutros al-Rahi
- Eparch: Hanna Rahmé, OLM
- Bishops emeritus: Simon Atallah, OAM

Maronite Catholic Eparchy of Baalbek-Deir El Ahmar (in Latin: Eparchia Helipolitana-Rubrimonasteriensis Maronitarum) is an eparchy of the Maronite Church located in Deir El Ahmar, Lebanon. In 2012 there were 45,000 baptized. It is currently governed by Eparch Hanna Rahmé, OLM.

== Territory and statistics ==
The eparchy includes the cities of Baalbek, Hermel and Deir el Ahmar, its eparchial seat, where is located the Saint George Cathedral. The territory of the diocese covers 27 percent of the area of Lebanon and encounters the east and north of the Lebanese-Syrian border, to the west it extends to the high mountains and in the south it joins the Zahleh, established in 1990.

Its territory is divided into 34 parishes and in 2012 there were 45,000 Maronite Catholics.

== History ==
The presence of Christian churches in the city of Baalbek can be traced to the year 96, when is mentioned its first Christian bishop. Emperor Constantine the Great (around 288-337) had to build a large church there and the work of excavation of its remains began in 1933. The Maronite Eparchy of Baalbek is relatively recent. The first bishop known is Gabriel I Moubarak, mentioned around 1671. Like all Maronite seats, its canonical erection was confirmed in the Maronite Synod of Mount Lebanon in 1736. On August 4, 1977 it was united to the Maronite Catholic Eparchy of Zahleh. On 9 June 1990 the two eparchies were separated and simultaneously the Eparchy of Baalbek assumed its present name. Its first elected eparch on August 5, 1990 was Philippe Boutros Chebaya.

== Eparchs of Baalbek ==
- Gabriel I Moubarak (about 1671 - 1732 deceased)
- Arsenius (mentioned in 1757)
- Gabriel II Moubarak (1763 - July 28, 1788 deceased)
- Peter Moubarak (1788 - November 17, 1807 deceased)
- Anthony Khazen (1808 - February 18, 1858 deceased)
- John Peter El Hajj (August 15, 1861 - June 23, 1890 confirmed Maronite Patriarch of Antioch)
- John Murad (June 12, 1892 - May 1, 1937 deceased)
- Elias Richa (October 10, 1937 - August 24, 1953 deceased)
- Abdallah Nujaim (April 4, 1954 - November 12, 1966 resigned)
- Chucrallah Harb (March 15, 1967 - August 4, 1977 appointed Eparch of Jounieh)

== Eparchs of Baalbek and Zahle ==
- Georges Scandar, (August 4, 1977 - June 9, 1990 appointed Eparch of Zahleh)

== Eparchs of Baalbek-Deir El Ahmar ==
- Philippe Boutros Chebaya, (June 9, 1990 - June 10, 1995 withdrawn)
- Paul-Mounged El-Hachem, (June 10, 1995 - August 27, 2005 appointed titular archbishop of Darni)
- Simon Atallah, OAM, (September 24, 2005 - March 14, 2015 withdrawn)
- Hanna Rahmé, OLM, (since June 20, 2015)

== See also ==
- List of Catholic dioceses in Lebanon
- Christianity in Lebanon

== Sources ==
- http://booksnow2.scholarsportal.info/ebooks/oca2/4/dictionnairedhis06bauduoft/dictionnairedhis06bauduoft.pdf, vol. VI, Paris, 1932, coll. 7-8.
- Annuario Pontificio, Libreria Editrice Vaticana, Città del Vaticano, 2003, ISBN 88-209-7422-3.
