= Luis Robles (disambiguation) =

Luis Robles (born 1984) is an American soccer goalkeeper

Luis Robles may also refer to:

- Luis Antonio Robles (1849-1899), Colombian lawyer and politician
- Luis Robles Díaz (1938-2007), Mexican Roman Catholic prelate
- Luis Robles (Mexican footballer) (born 1986), Mexican football centre-back

== See also ==
- Louis Robles (born 1996), English football winger
