= Paul Bui Chu Tao =

- Bishop of Phát Diệm
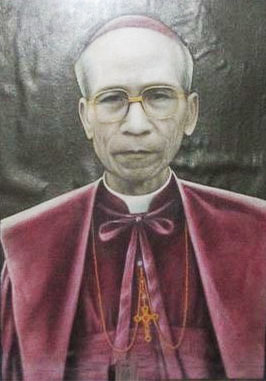
- Native name: Phaolô Bùi Chu Tạo
- Church: Catholic Church
- Diocese: Diocese of Phát Diệm
- In office: 24 January 1959 – 3 November 1998
- Predecessor: Thaddeus Lê Hữu Từ
- Successor: Joseph Nguyễn Văn Yến
- Previous posts: Titular Bishop of Numida (1959-1960); Apostolic Administrator of Phát Diệm (1956-1959)

Orders
- Ordination: 13 March 1937 by Jean-Baptiste Nguyễn Bá Tòng
- Consecration: 26 April 1959 by Joseph-Marie Trịnh Như Khuê

Personal details
- Born: 21 January 1909 Tam Châu (in present-day Khánh Nhạc), Ninh Bình province, Protectorate of Tonkin, Indochinese Union, French Empire
- Died: 5 May 2001 (aged 92) Hanoi, Vietnam

Paul Bui Chu Tao (21 January 1909 in Tam Châu, – 5 May 2001) was Bishop of the Roman Catholic Diocese of Phát Diệm.

== Life ==
He studied at the Phuc Nhac Minor Seminary and the Thuong Kiem Grand Seminary.

The Apostolic Vicar of Phát Diệm, Jean-Baptiste Tong Nguyên Ba, consecrated him to the priesthood on 13 March 1937. He spent the next 14 years serving at the Minor Seminary Phuc Yue Institute and the Thuong Kiem Grand Seminary. Pius XII appointed him on 30 November 1956 as Apostolic Administrator of Phát Diệm.

John XXIII appointed him Apostolic Vicar of Phát Diệm and Titular Bishop of Numida on 24 January 1959. The Apostolic Vicar of Hanoi, Joseph Marie Trịnh Như Khuê, consecrated him to the bishophood on 26 April of that year.

The Pope raised the apostolic vicariate to the bishopric on 24 November 1960 and thus he was appointed bishop of Phát Diệm. On 3 November 1998, John Paul II rescinded his age-related resignation.

He died in hospital on 5 May 2001 and was buried at the sanctuary of the Cathedral of Phat Diem.

In electoral terms, he chose In caritate non ficta. His motto was ‘love is not false’.
