= Diocese of Numida =

Roman Catholic titular see

Roman Empire - Mauretania Caesariensis (125 AD)

Numida was an ancient Roman town in the Roman province of Mauretania Caesariensis. It was located in modern northern Algeria.

The town was also the seat of an ancient Christian diocese of the Roman Catholic Church, of which very little is known. That Diocese survives today as a titular bishopric.

The location of the classical antiquity has been lost since the Muslim conquest of the Maghreb, and all that remains is the titular bishopric of the Roman Catholic Church that was once centered in that town.

== Bishopric ==
Today Numida survives as a titular bishopric and the current bishop is Timothy J. O'Malley, auxiliary bishop of Chicago.

=== Known bishops of the diocese include ===
- At the 411 Carthage conference between the Catholic and Donatist bishops of Roman North Africa, the town was represented by the Donatist bishop Gennaro, without a Catholic opponent.
- Vittore participated in the synod assembled in Carthage by the Arian King Huneric the Vandal, after which Vittore was exiled.
- Morandini, an apostolic nuncio.
- Ildefonso Naselli fl. 20 September 1728
- Severino Maria Castelli fl. 27. März 1765
- Etienne Blanquet de Rouville of Reims 1828–1838
- Paul Bui Chu Tao of Phát Diem 1959–1960
- Cornélio Veerman Cametá 1961–1970
- Edward Louis Heston 1972–1973
- Mario Pio Gaspari 1973–1983
- Giovanni Battista Morandini 1983–2024
- Timothy J. O'Malley 2024–

== See also ==
- Numida helmeted guineafowl
- Mauretania Caesariensis
