= Petar Rajič =

Croatian Canadian Catholic prelate (born 1959)

The Most Reverend Petar Rajič
- Prefect of the Papal Household
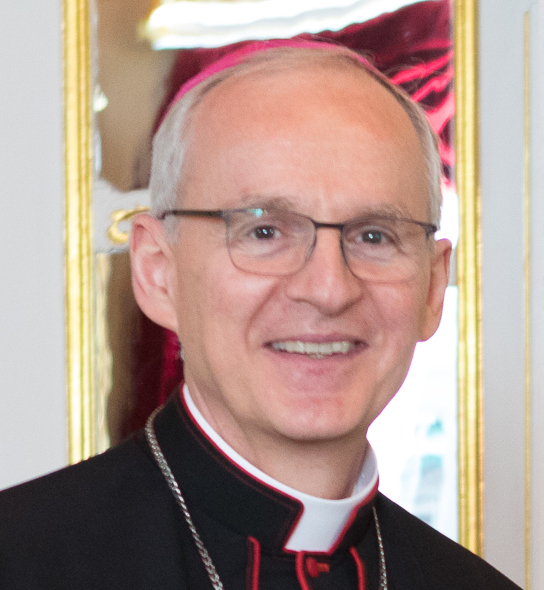
- Rajič in 2019
- Church: Catholic
- Appointed: 30 March 2026
- Predecessor: Georg Gänswein
- Other post: Titular Archbishop of Sarsenterum (2009‍–‍ )
- Previous posts: Apostolic Nuncio to Italy and San Marino (2024‍–‍2026); Apostolic Nuncio to Latvia, Lithuania and Estonia (2019‍–‍2024); Apostolic Nuncio to Angola and São Tomé and Príncipe (2015‍–‍2019); Apostolic Nuncio to Yemen and United Arab Emirates (2010‍–‍2015); Apostolic Nuncio to Bahrain, Kuwait and Qatar (2009‍–‍2015); Apostolic Delegate to the Arabian Peninsula (2009‍–‍2015)

Orders
- Ordination: 29 June 1987 by Pavao Žanić
- Consecration: 23 January 2010 by Tarcisio Bertone

Personal details
- Born: 12 June 1959 (age 67) Toronto, Canada
- Education: University of Toronto; Pontifical Lateran University
- Motto: Christus Dominus nos liberavit (Latin for 'For freedom Christ has set us free')

Styles of Petar Rajič
- Reference style: His Excellency; The Most Reverend
- Spoken style: Your Excellency
- Religious style: Archbishop

Petar Antun Rajič (born 12 June 1959) is a Croatian Canadian prelate of the Catholic Church who is the Prefect of the Papal Household. He worked in the diplomatic service of the Holy See from 1993 to 2026. An archbishop since 2009, he served as Apostolic Nuncio to several countries between 2009 and 2026, most recently to Italy and San Marino from 2024 to 2026.

== Biography ==
Petar Antun Rajič was born in Toronto on 12 June 1959 to Catholic Liberan and Dominika Rajič, Croatian immigrants who crossed from what is now Slovenia to Austria in 1958 and after living for a time in a refugee camp emigrated to Canada. He is the eldest of three children. He is fluent in English, Croatian, French, Italian and Portuguese.

He entered the University of Toronto in 1978 and earned his Bachelor of Arts degeree in 1982. He then studied philosophy and theology at the Interdiocesan Seminary of Sarajevo, Bosnia-Herzegovina, graduating in 1987. He was ordained a priest on 29 June 1987 by Pavao Žanić, Bishop of Mostar-Duvno and the apostolic administrator of Trebinje-Mrkan, at the Cathedral of Mary, Mother of the Church in Mostar. From 1989 to 1993 he studied at the Pontifical Lateran University, earning his licentiate in 1991 and doctorate in 1993.

== Diplomatic career ==
Coat of arms as Prefect of the Prefecture of the Papal Household

He entered the diplomatic service of the Holy See on 1 July 1993 and fulfilled assignments in Iran and Lithuania as well as in the office of the Secretariat of State in Rome. On 2 December 2009, Pope Benedict XVI named him titular archbishop of Sarsenterum and Apostolic Nuncio to Kuwait, Bahrain, and Qatar along with Apostolic Delegate to the Arabian Peninsula. He received his episcopal consecration on 23 January 2010 from Cardinal Tarcisio Bertone. On 27 March 2010 he was named nuncio to Yemen and the United Arab Emerates as well.

On 15 June 2015, Pope Francis named him apostolic nuncio to Angola and São Tomé e Principe.

On 15 June 2019 he was named apostolic nuncio to Lithuania, adding the responsibilities of Estonia and Latvia on 6 August.

On 11 March 2024, he was named apostolic nuncio to Italy and San Marino.

== Roman Curia ==
On 30 March 2026, he was named Prefect of the Papal Household.

== See also ==
- List of heads of the diplomatic missions of the Holy See

Catholic Church titles
| New title | Titular Archbishop of Sarsenterum; 23 January 2010 – present | Incumbent |
Diplomatic posts
| Preceded by Paul-Mounged El-Hachem | Apostolic Delegate to the Arabian Peninsula; 22 December 2009 – 15 June 2015 | Succeeded by Francisco Montecillo Padilla |
| Preceded by Paul-Mounged El-Hachem | Apostolic Nuncio to Bahrain, Kuwait, and Qatar; 2 December 2009 – 15 June 2015 | Succeeded by Francisco Montecillo Padilla |
| Preceded by Paul-Mounged El-Hachem | Apostolic Nuncio to Yemen and the United Arab Emirates; 27 March 2010 – 15 June 2015 | Succeeded by Francisco Montecillo Padilla |
| Preceded by Novatus Rugambwa | Apostolic Nuncio to Angola and São Tomé and Príncipe; 15 June 2015 – 15 June 2019 | Succeeded by Giovanni Gaspari |
| Preceded by Pedro López Quintana | Apostolic Nuncio to Latvia, Lithuania, and Estonia; 15 June 2015 – 15 June 2019 | Succeeded by Georg Gänswein |
| Preceded by Emil Paul Tscherrig | Apostolic Nuncio to Italy and San Marino; 11 March 2024 – 30 March 2026 | Succeeded by Edgar Peña Parra |
Catholic Church titles
| Preceded by Georg Gänswein | Prefect of the Papal Household; 30 March 2026 – present | Incumbent |
