= Timothy J. O'Malley =

American Catholic priest (born 1959)

His Excellency, The Most Reverend Timothy James O'Malley
- Auxiliary Bishop of Chicago; Titular Bishop of Numida
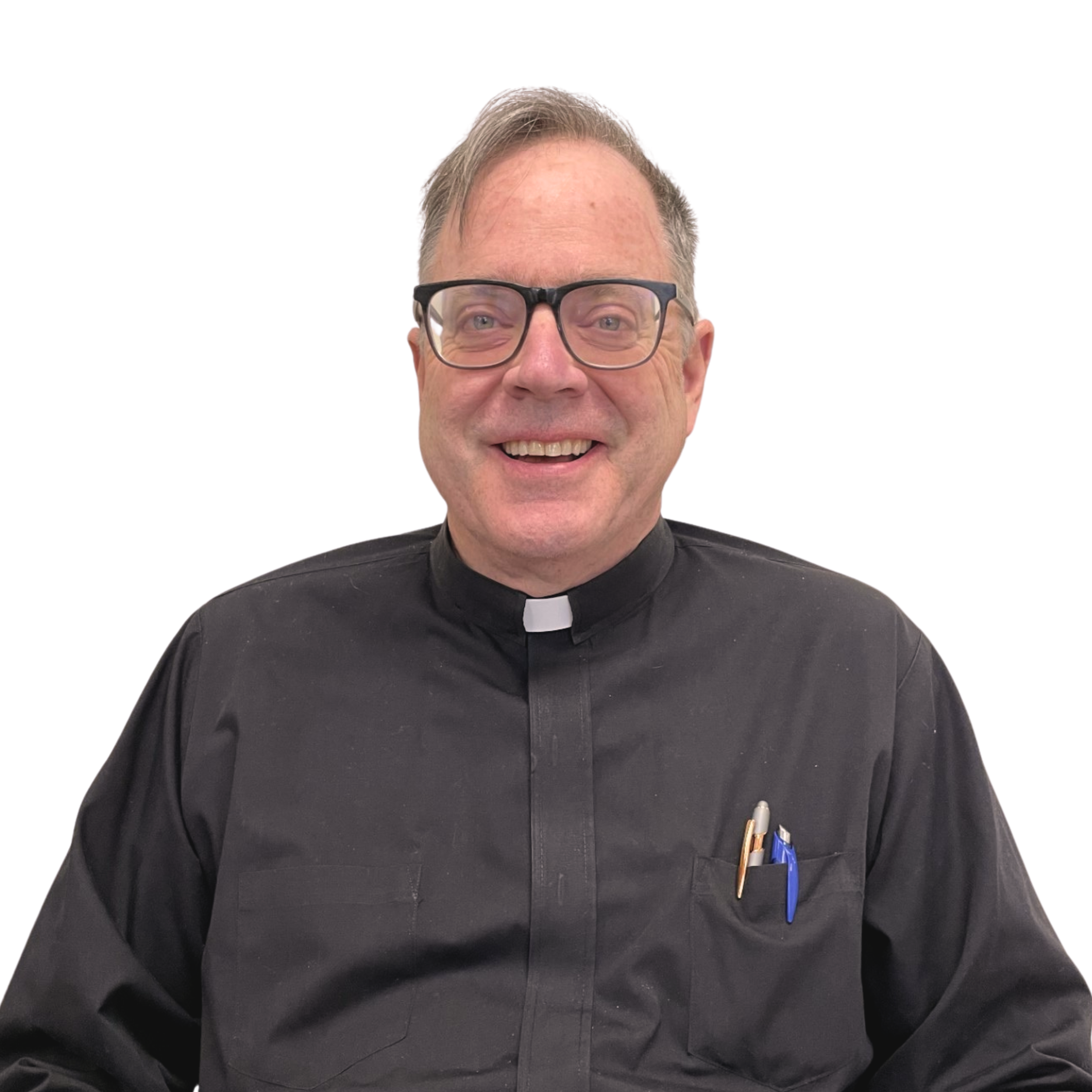
- O'Malley in 2025
- Archdiocese: Chicago
- Appointed: December 20, 2024
- Installed: February 26, 2025
- Other post: Titular Bishop of Numida
- Previous posts: Pastor at Most Blessed Trinity Parish in Waukegan, IL (2018‍–‍present); Pastor at St. Genevieve Paris in Chicago, IL (2015‍–‍2018); Pastor at St. Joseph Parish in Round Lake, IL (2007‍–‍2015)

Orders
- Ordination: May 24, 1997 by Francis Eugene George
- Consecration: February 26, 2025 by Blase J. Cupich, Robert Gerald Casey, and Jeffrey S. Grob

Personal details
- Born: December 17, 1959 (age 66) Evergreen Park, Illinois
- Education: Purdue University; University of Illinois; DePaul University; Mundelein Seminary
- Motto: Our daily bread

Styles of Timothy James O'Malley
- Reference style: His Excellency; The Most Reverend
- Spoken style: Your Excellency
- Religious style: Bishop

Timothy James O'Malley (born December 17, 1959) is an American prelate of the Roman Catholic Church in the United States who has been serving as an auxiliary bishop for the Archdiocese of Chicago in Illinois since 2025.

== Early life ==
Timothy O'Malley was born in Evergreen Park, Illinois on December 17, 1959. He graduated in 1978 from Loyola Academy in Wilmette, Illinois. He then attended Purdue University in West Lafayette, Indiana, earning a Bachelor of Arts degree in economics. O'Malley next entered DePaul University Law School, obtaining a Juris Doctor.After working in law for several years, O'Malley decided to become a priest. He then enrolled at Mundelein Seminary in Mundelein, Illinois.

=== Priesthood ===
O'Malley was ordained to the priesthood at Holy Name Cathedral in Chicago by Archbishop Francis Eugene George for the Archdiocese of Chicago on May 24, 1997.

== Episcopacy ==
Pope Francis appointed O'Malley as titular bishop of Numida and as an auxiliary bishop for the Archdiocese of Chicago on December 20, 2024. O'Malley was consecrated as a bishop on February 26, 2025, at Holy Name Cathedral by Cardinal Blase Cupich.

== See also ==
- Catholic Church hierarchy
- Catholic Church in the United States
- Historical list of the Catholic bishops of the United States
- List of Catholic bishops of the United States
- Lists of patriarchs, archbishops, and bishops

== Episcopal succession ==
Catholic Church titles
Preceded by –	Auxiliary Bishop of Chicago; 2025–present	Succeeded by –
