= Our Lady of Bechouat =

Marian shrine in the Beqaa Valley of Lebanon

The Sanctuary of Our Lady of Bechouat (French: Sanctuaire de Notre-Dame de Béchouate), also spelled Beshouat or Beshwat, is a Marian shrine in the village of Bechouat in the Beqaa Valley of Lebanon.

In 1741, a Byzantine wooden icon of the Virgin Mary was discovered in one of the deep caves. A church was built above the cave, and since then, it has become a place of pilgrimage.

== The Miracles of Our Lady of Bechouat ==
Divine miracles have been reported and attributed to Our Lady of Bechouat. Thousands of worshippers have visited the sanctuary where they march from the village of Bechouat to the old church where the blue and white statue of the Virgin Mary stands. The statue, a replica of the one at Our Lady of Pontmain in France, was erected a century ago. Some worshippers spend the nights humbly praying or in meditation at the church door.

One of the miracles attributed to Our Lady of Bechouat happened to a Lebanese man, Tony Sukkar, 37, who resided in New York. Sukkar suffered from a chronic disease, which paralyzed his upper body completely. Upon a visit to his native Lebanon, Mr. Sukkar visited the old church where he prayed to be healed. Soon after, he was healed and able to move his upper body. Sukkar constructed a statue of the Virgin Mary in his home town of Deir el Ahmar in honor of Our Lady of Bechouat.

Both Lebanese and foreigners, Christian and Muslim worshipers have experienced divine miracles at Our Lady of Bechouat. One happened to a young child of Muslim parents from Jordan. Mohammed Naef Al-Awwad Al-Hawadi was ten years old when he accompanied his parents on a pilgrimage to the old church. The child saw the Virgin Mary's statue blink. Worshippers who spent the night at the church said they also saw the eyes, hands and rosary of the Virgin Mary's statue move. In 1871, a similar occurrence had been reported at Our Lady of Pontmain in France.
