= Hanna Rahmé =

Hanna Rahmé OLM
- Eparch of Baalbek-Deir El Ahmar
- Native name: حنا رحمه
- Church: Catholic Church
- Diocese: Eparchy of Baalbek-Deir El Ahmar
- Installed: 20 June 2015
- Predecessor: Simon Atallah

Orders
- Ordination: 29 July 1990
- Consecration: 1 August 2015 by Bechara Boutros al-Rahi

Personal details
- Born: 18 July 1960 (age 65) Aynata, South Governorate, Lebanon

Hanna Rahmé, OLM (born on 18 July 1960 in Aynata, Nabatiyeh Governorate, Lebanon) is the current Maronite eparch of the Maronite Catholic Eparchy of Baalbek-Deir El Ahmar.

== Life ==
Hanna Rahmé entered on 6 August 1979 in the OLM and on 6 August 1989 made his religious vows. He received on 29 July 1990 his ordination to the priesthood.

The decision of the Synod of Maronite Church from 10 to 14 March 2015 convened to elected him bishop of Baalbek-Deir El Ahmar. Pope Francis approved his election as Bishop of Baalbek-Deir El Ahmar on 20 June 2015.

Rahmé was consecrated bishop on 1 August 2015 by Maronite Patriarch of Antioch Cardinal Bechara Boutros al-Rahi, OMM and his co-consecrators were Simon Atallah, Emeritus eparch of Baalbek-Deir El Ahmar, and Paul-Mounged El-Hachem, Titular bishop of Darnis.
