= Apostolic Nunciature to Bahrain =

Diplomatic post of the Holy See

The Apostolic Nunciature to Bahrain is an ecclesiastical office of the Catholic Church in Bahrain. It is a diplomatic post of the Holy See, whose representative is called the Apostolic Nuncio with the rank of an ambassador. The Apostolic Nuncio to Bahrain is also the Apostolic Nuncio to Kuwait and resides in Kuwait City.

Before the Holy See and Bahrain established diplomatic relations, the Holy See represented its interests in Bahrain through delegations with regional responsibilities, first the Apostolic Delegation to the Red Sea Region established by Pope Paul VI on 3 July 1969 and then the Apostolic Delegation to the Arabian Peninsula established by Pope John Paul II on 26 March 1992. The Holy See and Bahrain established diplomatic relations on 12 January 2000.

== Papal representatives to Bahrain ==
- Giuseppe De Andrea (28 June 2001 – 27 August 2005)
- Paul-Mounged El-Hachem (27 August 2005 – 2 December 2009)
- Petar Rajič (2 December 2009 – 15 June 2015)
- Francisco Montecillo Padilla (26 April 2016 – 17 April 2020)
- Eugene Nugent (11 February 2021 – 25 May 2026)
