= Deir Al-Ahmar =

Deir el Ahmar دير الأحمر
- Location in Lebanon
- Coordinates: 34°07′23″N 36°07′44″E
- Country: Lebanon
- Governorate: Baalbek-Hermel
- District: Baalbek
- Elevation: 4,200 ft (1,280 m)
- Time zone: UTC+2 (EET)
  - Summer (DST): +3
- Website: www.deirelahmar.com

Deir El Ahmar (Arabic: دير الأحمر, romanized: Dayr al-ʾAḥmar) is a Lebanese town, located 100km from Beirut and 22km northwest of Baalbek in the Bekaa Valley in Lebanon.

== Demography and religion ==
The population of Deir el Ahmar is approximately 5,947 as of 2015. The main religion is Christianity, most of them are Maronites.There are eight historical churches, including: Saint Joseph Church, which was completed on September 15, 1914; Our Lady of the Tower Church, which was built on the ruins of the temple of Jupiter; Saint Georges; Saint Nohra; Saint Michel, old and new; Saint Elie; Our Lady of Cultivation. The town serves as the center of the archbishopric of Baalbek–Deir El-Ahmar.

== Geography ==
Deir el Ahmar's climate is mild during spring and autumn, dry and warm in summer, and cold during winter. The town has an altitude that ranges between 950m and 1,150m above sea level and receives heavy snow during the winter. For this reason, some roads leading to the town may be temporarily closed during this period. Deir el Ahmar has an area of approximately 42 hectares (103.78 acres; 0.16 sq mi).

== History ==
=== Roman period ===
Deir el Ahmar, like the rest of Lebanon, was part of the Roman Empire. During the third century A.D., the Roman emperor Caracalla built a temple for the God Jupiter in the vicinity of the village. The Temple of Jupiter would later become the center of the Syriac Orthodox Christians.

=== Byzantine period ===
During the Byzantine period the Saydet el Borj (Our Lady of the Tower) church was built on the ruins of the temple of Jupiter. Qasr el Benet (The castle of the King's daughter) was built near Chlifa during this time.

=== 7th–16th century ===
From the 7th–16th centuries the Syriac Orthodox Christians (known as Jacobites) and Muslims inhabited the area. The temple of Jupiter became the center for the Syriac-Jacobite Christians, who were ruled by the Muslim Arabs. There were two notable earthquakes in the area during this period, one in 1157 and the other in 1202.

=== 16th–19th century period ===
During the period from the 16th–19th centuries, Maronite shepherds from Niha, Becharre and Aakoura established in the region around Deir el Ahmar, where better grazing was available.

In 1838, Eli Smith noted Deir Al-Ahmar's population as being predominantly Maronite. In the 19th century other Maronite families from Becharre, Aakoura, Byblos and Batroun established and formed the village of Deir el Ahmar.

Deir el Ahmar has eight historic churches. The courtyard of Our Lady of the Tower has Greek inscriptions on its stone walls. Ruins of a cellar that reportedly dates to the Roman era are nearby the church. Our Lady of the Tower Church (Saydet el Borj) was built on the ruins of the temple of Jupiter during the Byzantine era. The Castle of the King's Daughter (Qasr el Benet) near Chlifa was also built during this period.

== Origin of the name ==
Historians believe that the name of the village originated from the Aramaic, "Deir Ohmor’" which means "Monastery of the Lord's Brother." Since the word deir means monastery and the Arabic word for the color red is ahmar, some historians believe that the origin of Deir el Ahmar's name can be attributed to the large monastery in the area that was built with red stones, thus the name of the town can be literary translated to "Red Monastery."

While the people who have lived in that period tell a different story which state that after the baptism of the pagan tribes living in the village the monks built a monastery on Jupiter's Temple (a present historical ruin in the village) which the pagans used for the worship of their gods, so villagers used to come every morning to the Mass before going to their work. The villagers got surprised one morning because they did not hear the Church bell toll and hurried to the monastery. They found the monks slaughtered like sheep, by the pagan tribes that fled away and came back to avenge their gods. The people were terrified to see blood all around the place, so they run back shouting: "The monastery is red...." in Arabic: "Al Deir Ahmar" the "Al" was cancelled and the village as called "Deir El Ahmar".

== Society and traditions ==
=== Traditions ===
The people of Deir el Ahmar are known for keeping the rural Lebanese traditions including cooking traditional food such as Mezzeh, Tabbouleh and Kebbeh. Wedding ceremonies including traditional songs, dances, poems (zaffeh) and religious ceremonies. Traditional clothes are worn for folkloric occasions, men wear "sherwal", the "Ghombaz" and "tarboush" or "Kafiat and Ighal" on their heads, and women wear "abbaya".On special occasions (weddings and young burials), people from Deir El ahmar shoot bullets into the air.

=== The WADA organization ===
The Women's Association of Deir El Ahmar (WADA) is a Lebanese non-profit, Non-Governmental Organization established in 1994. Their aim is to promote women's role in rural development and welfare of society in the region around Deir el Ahmar. The organization was founded by volunteers from Deir el Ahmar, including current president Dunia Baroud El Khoury, Yvonne El Khoury Lichaa and René Chouah Mhanna. WADA's geographical focus is a wide area of 157 square kilometres (61 mi^{2}), including 33 municipalities around Deir el Ahmar, Baalbeck and Hermel, in the north of the Bekaa valley in Lebanon. They have won a number of awards including the Dubai International Award.

With the aid of local and international institutions, WADA have been involved in the following projects:

- Training sessions for rural women in handicrafts, natural food Production and agriculture.
- Supporting marketing and promotion of the products through fairs and exhibitions.
- Awareness Programs for Local Communities which seek to protect the environment, improve health care, support education, and promote rural Ecotourism.
- Executing a sustainable development project.
- The Rural Development Center (RDC).

== Economy ==
Deir el Ahmar's location in the fertile Beqaa Valley makes agriculture its main economical activity. The town produces jam, jelly, marmalade, and dairy products as well as handcrafts, such as pottery, crochet, and lace.

Deir el Ahmar, like the rest of the Beqaa Valley, has good potential for tourism due to the mild climate, pristine nature, and the variety of historical and archaeological sites. Ecotourism, especially natural excursions and hiking trips are becoming more popular in the region of Deir el Ahmar. Tourists also visit the local organic farms and participate in farming activities. However, the tourism sector remains mostly underdeveloped in Deir el Ahmar. Hotels or צotels are abandoned because of the hospitality idea that says: visitors are welcome and they may choose any house to come in and stay. An economical and demographic study conducted in Deir el Ahmar by Dr Gaby Saliba in 2001 highlights the following problems:

- High emigration of youth (62% of population) and still increasing mainly caused by the lack of high education institutions, and the nearest university is 40 minutes away.
- Deficient role of the women in development
- High rates of Unemployment

== Local Authorities ==
The municipality have an elected municipal council for 6 years. It has administrative and financial independence but remains under the control and supervision of the central government. As of 2023 the main authority and the most known is currently Dr. Antoine Habchy.

== Eparchy of Baalbek-Deir El-Ahmar (Maronite) ==
In 1671 the area was established as the Diocese of Baalbek. It was renamed as the Diocese of Baalbek e Zahlé on August 4, 1977, and again to Diocese of Baalbek–Deir Al-Ahmar on June 9, 1990, when it lost territory to establish the Diocese of Zahlé. The Bishop is Hanna Rahme.

== Educational institutions ==
Deir El Ahmar has four schools, two public schools and two private schools. Appropriately 687 students are schooled in the public institution, and 2485 student are schooled in the private.

== Notable people ==
- Elissa (singer) – Lebanese singer
- Marie Keyrouz, Lebanese Christian nun and singer, she founded "L'Ensemble de la Paix" at Lebanon, and The International Institute of the Sacred Chant, in France.
- Yara, Lebanese singer.

== Holidays ==
- Saint Joseph Day (March 19), religious ceremony in Saint Joseph Church
- Saint Elie Day (July 20), religious ceremony in Saint Elias Church
- The Assumption of Mary (August 15) religious ceremony at the shrine of Our Lady of Bechouat and Our Lady of The Tower Church
- Feast of the Blessed Sacrement (September 14), religious ceremony in all Deil el Ahmar churches
- Saint Nohra, religious ceremony in Mar Nohra Church

== See also ==
- Dahr El Ahmar

== Bibliography ==
- Robinson, E.; Smith, E. (1841). Biblical Researches in Palestine, Mount Sinai and Arabia Petraea: A Journal of Travels in the year 1838. Vol. 3. Boston: Crocker & Brewster.
