= List of Catholic dioceses in Lebanon =

The Catholic Church in Lebanon is particularly complex, given the mix of rite-specific (Latin and Eastern Catholic) branches, yet its entire episcopate is joined in a special Assembly of the Catholic Patriarchs and Bishops of Lebanon.

The Latin pre-diocesan jurisdiction participates in the Episcopal conference of the Arab region Latin bishops.

Four of the five Eastern Catholic churches (not the Chaldean Catholics) count Lebanese member(s) in their Patriarchal Synods, Antioch/Beirut being thrice a Patriarchal see in name and/or fact :

- Synod of the Maronite Church (mainly Lebanese)
- Synod of the Greek-Melkite Catholic Church
- Synod of the Syriac Catholic Church (each with a major Lebanese component)
- Synod of the Armenian Catholic Church.

There also is an Apostolic Nunciature to Lebanon as papal diplomatic representation (embassy-level), headquartered in Jounieh, but accredited in the national capital Beirut.

== Current dioceses in Lebanon ==
=== Current Latin ===
- (pre-diocesan) Apostolic Vicariate of Beirut, exempt, for all of Lebanon

=== Current Eastern Catholic (Arch)eparchies ===
==== Maronite ====
(Antiochian Rite)

- Maronite Catholic Patriarchate of Antioch and the Whole Levant, at Beirut (Lebanon), Chief of the church, with a sole Suffragan in the proper province of the Patriarch of Antioch:
  - Maronite Catholic Eparchy of Joubbé, Sarba and Jounieh (Jebbeh–Sarba–Jounieh)
- also immediately subject to the Patriarch, in Lebanon :
  - Maronite Catholic Archeparchy of Antelias
  - Maronite Catholic Eparchy of Baalbek-Deir El Ahmar (Baalbek–Deir Al-Ahmar)
  - Maronite Catholic Eparchy of Batroun
  - Maronite Catholic Archeparchy of Beirut
  - Maronite Catholic Eparchy of Byblos
  - Maronite Catholic Eparchy of Sidon (Saïdā)
  - Maronite Catholic Archeparchy of Tripoli
  - Maronite Catholic Archeparchy of Tyre (Tyr)
  - Maronite Catholic Eparchy of Zahleh (Zahlé)

==== Melkite (Greek) Catholic ====
(Byzantine Rite )

- Melkite Greek Catholic Archeparchy of Baalbek
- Melkite Greek Catholic Archeparchy of Beirut and Byblos (nominally Metropolitan)
- Metropolitan Melkite Greek Catholic Archeparchy of Tyre, with three Lebanese archiepiscopal suffragans :
  - Melkite Greek Catholic Archeparchy of Baniyas and Marjeyoun
  - Melkite Greek Catholic Archeparchy of Sidon (Saïda) and Deir el-Kamar
  - Melkite Greek Catholic Archeparchy of Tripoli
- Melkite Greek Catholic Archeparchy of Zahle and Forzol and all the Bekaa

==== Armenian Catholic ====
(Armenian Rite in Armenian language)

- Armenian Catholic Patriarchate of Cilicia, the patriarchal head of the particular church for the whole Armenian rite, with cathedral see in Beirut, Lebanon, as Metropolitan Archeparch (Archbishop), with four suffragan eparchies, including one Lebanese :
  - Armenian Catholic Archeparchy of Beirut, the Proper (arch)eparchy of the Armenian Catholic Patriarch, in Lebanon and Turkey

==== Chaldean Catholic ====
(Syro-Oriental Rite)

- Chaldean Catholic Eparchy of Beirut

==== Syriac Catholic ====
(Antiochian Rite)

- Syriac Catholic Patriarchate of Antioch, with a cathedral see in Beirut, for Lebanon, with a single suffragan, for the same proper eparchy (diocese) of the Patriarch:
  - Syriac Catholic Eparchy of Beirut.

== Defunct jurisdictions ==
=== Titular sees ===
- One (Latin) Metropolitan Titular archbishopric : Tyrus (Tyre)
- One (Latin) Non-Metropolitan Titular archbishopric : Heliopolis in Phœnicia
- Eleven Episcopal Titular bishoprics :
  - nine Latin Titular bishoprics : Aradus (Ruâd island), Arca in Phoenicia of the Romans ('Argah), Botrys (Batrun), Jableh, Orthosias in Phoenicia (ruins of Bordj-Hacmon-El-Yeoudi), Rachlea (Marakya?, Rakhlé?, ), Sarepta of the Romans (Sarfend, Sarafand), Sidon (Saïda), Tripolis in Phœnicia
  - two Eastern Catholic (both Maronite) Titular bishoprics : Arca in Phœnicia of the Maronites ('Argah), Sarepta of the Maronites.

=== Other ===
(Eastern Catholic : Antiochian Rite)

- Maronite Eparchy of Eden

== See also ==
- List of Catholic dioceses (structured view)
- Phoenice (Roman province), notably for titular sees
- Maronite Christianity in Lebanon
- Melkite Christianity in Lebanon

== Sources and external links ==
- GCatholic - data for all sections
