= Holy See–Pakistan relations =

- Pakistan: Holy See

Holy See–Pakistan relations are foreign relations between Pakistan and the Holy See (Vatican City). Both countries established diplomatic relations in 1961. The Holy See has a nunciature in Islamabad. Pakistan's embassy in Switzerland is accredited to the Holy See.

== Bilateral visits ==
The Holy See's diplomatic contacts with Pakistan are through the Secretariat of State on the one hand and the Pakistan Ministry of Foreign Affairs on the others. Other entities with a special interest are, on the side of the Holy See, the Congregation for the Evangelization of Peoples, which oversees the internal organization of the Catholic Church in Pakistan and, on the other hand, the Ministry for Minorities Affairs, which from the government's side overlooks the interests of Christians in Pakistan.

On 1 October 2009, Asif Ali Zardari, President of the Islamic Republic of Pakistan, met Pope Benedict XVI at his residence in Castelgandolfo and then also met with Cardinal Secretary of State Tarcisio Bertone and Archbishop Dominique Mamberti, the Holy See's Secretary for Relations with States. Earlier contacts at a similar level included that between President Musharraf and Pope John Paul II on 30 September 2004. In February 1981, Pope John Paul II met the President of Pakistan during his visit to that country. Minister for Minorities Affairs Shahbaz Bhatti met Vatican Foreign Minister Archbishop Dominique Mamberti at the Apostolic Palace in September 2010 following the 2010 Pakistan floods. The President of the Pontifical Council for Interreligious Dialogue, Cardinal Jean-Louis Tauran visited Pakistan in November 2010 and held meetings with Minister for Religious Minorities, Shahbaz Bhatti, and the President of Pakistan Asif Ali Zardari.

== Controversy ==
Pope Benedict has called for the scrapping of Pakistan's controversial blasphemy law. Thousands of protesters from various religious parties protested against the Pope's remarks and against any change to the blasphemy law. Hafiz Hussain Ahmed, a leader of the religious party Jamiat Ulema-e-Islam (F) regarded Pope Benedict's statement as an "interference in Pakistan's internal matters." Whereas the then Pakistan Prime Minister, Yousaf Raza Gillani, stated that the blasphemy law "is our law and we will work according to our law."

== Militancy ==
According to Wikileaks cables, the Holy See viewed Pakistan as "an unreliable coalition player" and doubted the government's willingness and sincerity to effectively take part in counter-terrorism efforts soon after the 9/11 incident. The cables verified an increasingly strained relationship between the Vatican and Pakistan.

== See also ==
- Foreign relations of the Holy See
- Foreign relations of Pakistan
- Apostolic Nunciature to Pakistan
- Christianity in Pakistan
