= Germano Penemote =

Angolan prelate

His Excellency, The Most Reverend Germano Penemote
- Apostolic Nuncio to Pakistan; Titular Archbishop of Treia
- Appointed: 16 June 2023
- Predecessor: Christophe Zakhia El-Kassis
- Other post: Titular Archbishop of Treia

Orders
- Ordination: 6 December 1998
- Consecration: 12 August 2023 by Pietro Parolin, Pio Hipunyati and José Manuel Imbamba

Personal details
- Born: 24 October 1969 (age 56) Ondobe, Angola
- Motto: Omnes Fratres Estis
- Coat of arms

Styles of Germano Penemote
- Reference style: His Excellency; The Most Reverend
- Spoken style: Your Excellency
- Religious style: Archbishop

Germano Penemote (born 24 October 1969) is an Angolan prelate of the Catholic Church who works in the diplomatic service of the Holy See.

== Biography ==
Germano Penemote was born on 24 October 1969 in Ondobe, Angola. He was ordained a priest for the Roman Catholic Diocese of Ondjiva on 6 December 1998. He graduated in Utroque Iure and knows French, English, Italian, Portuguese and Spanish.

== Diplomatic career ==
He entered the Holy See Diplomatic Service on 1 July 2003, and has served in the apostolic nunciatures in Benin, Uruguay, Slovakia, Thailand, Hungary, Peru and Romania.

On 16 June 2023, Pope Francis appointed him Titular Archbishop of Treia and Apostolic Nuncio to Pakistan. He was consecrated as archbishop on 12 August 2023.

== See also ==
- List of heads of the diplomatic missions of the Holy See
