= Diocese of Sarsenterum =

Latin Catholic diocese

Coordinates: 43°04′58″N 17°57′21″E

Titular See of Sarsenterum Dioecesis Sarsenterensis Sarsenterska biskupija

Location
- Country: Bosnia and Herzegovina

Information
- Established: 2009 (originally in 533)

Current leadership
- Pope: Leo XIV
- Archbishop: Petar Rajič

Diocese of Sarsenterum (Latin: Dioecesis Sarsenterensis) was a Latin Catholic diocese in the area of present Bosnia and Herzegovina, restored as a titular see by Pope Benedict XVI in 2009. The first Titular Archbishop of the restored Titular See of Sarsenterum appointed was Petar Rajič.

== History ==
The Diocese of Sarsenterum was established during the Second Church Synod in Salona in 533 presided by Archbishop Honorius II. The Diocese was given the basilicas from the municipal areas of Dellontino, Stantino, Nouense (Neuense) per Rusticiarum, Potuatico, Beuzavatico (Benzavatico) and others as well. The priest Paulinus was elected and consecrated as its first bishop.

In 2009 Pope Benedict XVI restored it as a titular see and appointed Petar Rajič as titular Archbishop of Sarsenterum.

== Localization ==
Since no epigraphic inscription has been found to localize Sarsenterum, there are different theories about the location of this settlement.

Wilhelm Tomaschek located the settlement in the village of Goranci. Dominik Mandić questioned his opinion, arguing that there were no traces of an important ancient settlement in that area as well as that the area was difficult to access and did not have the source of fresh water.

Relying on the ancient Church provision that dioceses can only be founded in cities worthy of a bishop's dignity, some contemporary archaeologists and historians located in the area of Stolac where the most important urban center in that part of the province of Dalmatia developed.

== See also ==
- Catholic Church in Bosnia and Herzegovina
