= Apostolic Nunciature to Mongolia =

Diplomatic post of the Holy See

The Apostolic Nunciature to Mongolia is an ecclesiastical office of the Catholic Church in Mongolia. It is a diplomatic post of the Holy See, whose representative is called the Apostolic Nuncio with the rank of an ambassador. The title Apostolic Nuncio to Mongolia is held by the prelate appointed Apostolic Nuncio to South Korea; he resides in South Korea.

== List of papal representatives to Mongolia ==
Apostolic Nuncios

- John Bulaitis (8 September 1992 – 25 March 1997)
- Giovanni Battista Morandini (23 April 1997 – 6 March 2004)
- Emil Paul Tscherrig (17 June 2004 – 26 January 2008)
- Osvaldo Padilla (26 April 2008 – 15 September 2017)
- Alfred Xuereb (26 February 2018 – 8 December 2023)
- Giovanni Gaspari (2 March 2024 – present)
