= Philippe Boutros Chebaya =

Lebanese catholic priest (1920–2002)

Philippe Boutros Chebaya (May 20, 1920, in Bsharri, Lebanon – 8 October 2002) was the first Maronite bishop in 1990 of the newly established Maronite Catholic Eparchy of Baalbek-Deir El Ahmar in Lebanon.

== Life ==
On March 25, 1944, Philippe Boutros Chabaya was ordained to the priesthood in the Maronite Catholic Eparchy of Batroun. His appointment as first bishop of Baalbek-Deir El Ahmar took place on 9 June 1990. Maronite Patriarch of Antioch Cardinal Nasrallah Boutros Sfeir ordained Chebaya bishop on August 5, 1990 and his co-consecrators were Roland Aboujaoudé, Auxiliary Bishop of Antioch and Bishop Georges Abi-Saber, OLM, also Auxiliary Bishop of Antioch. His retirement as bishop by age-related reasons was on June 10, 1995. Until his death on October 8, 2002, he was Emeritus bishop of Baalbek-Deir El-Ahmar. His successor was Paul-Mounged El-Hachem.

== See also ==
- Catholic Church in Lebanon
