= Bechouat =

Bechouat بشوات
- Location in Lebanon
- Coordinates: 34°09′N 36°08′E
- Country: Lebanon
- Governorate: Baalbek-Hermel
- District: Baalbek
- Time zone: UTC+2 (EET)
  - Summer (DST): +3

Bechouat (also Beshouat) (Arabic: بشوات, romanized: Beshwāt) is a Lebanese village in the Beqaa Valley of Lebanon. The village is famous for the Sanctuary of Our Lady of Bechouat, a Marian shrine and the site of Christian pilgrimage. Divine miracles have been reported and attributed to Our Lady of Bechouat.

The people of Bechouat are Lebanese and followers of the Maronite Catholic Church. The ancestors of the inhabitants of the village came to Bechouat from Bsharri at the beginning of the 17th century.

The Church of Our Lady of Bechouat was built over the ruins of a Roman temple in the 18th century. An ancient oak tree shades the church’s small courtyard.

The name Bechouat has Aramaic origins, meaning "initiation" or "facilitator".

Archeological artifacts, such as jars and pottery, have been found in Bechouat’s funerary caves and rock-cut tombs. A votive stone altar with representations of the Heliopolitan Triad was also found in the village.

As of 2017, Bechouat had at least two informal tent settlements populated by Syrian refugees.
