= Simon Atallah =

Lebanese bishop

Simon Atallah OAM
- Eparch Emeritus of Baalbek-Deir El Ahmar
- Native name: سيمون عطالله
- Church: Maronite Church
- Diocese: Eparchy of Baalbek-Deir El Ahmar
- In office: 28 December 2005 – 14 March 2015
- Predecessor: Paul-Mounged El-Hachem
- Successor: Hanna Rahmé

Orders
- Ordination: 8 December 1963
- Consecration: 11 February 2006 by Nasrallah Boutros Sfeir

Personal details
- Born: 10 January 1937 (age 89) Hemayri, Adonis, Mandatory Lebanese Republic, French Empire

Simon Atallah, OAM (born 10 January 1937 in Hemayri, Lebanon) is a Lebanese Maronite emeritus eparch of the Maronite Catholic Eparchy of Baalbek-Deir El Ahmar.

== Life ==
Simon Atallah joined the OAM and received on 8 December 1963 his ordination to the priesthood. The General Chapter elected him in 1999 Superior general of his order. The Synod of the Maronite Church elected him on 24 September 2005 eparch of Baalbek-Deir El Ahmar. Pope Benedict XVI confirmed this election on 28 December 2005.

His episcopal ordination was by the hands of the Maronite Patriarch of Antioch, Cardinal Nasrallah Boutros Sfeir, on 11 February 2006 and his co-consecrators were Roland Aboujaoudé, auxiliary bishop of Antioch, and Tanios El Khoury, emeritus bishop of Sidon.

Atallah exercised his office till 14 March 2015. The decision from 10 to 14 March 2015 of the Maronite Church's Synod convened to elect Hanna Rahme, OLM, as his successor. Pope Francis agreed with this election on 20 June 2015.
