= Christophe Zakhia El-Kassis =

Vatican diplomat (born 1968)

His Excellency, The Most Reverend Christophe Zakhia El-Kassis
- Permanent Observer of the Holy See to the United Nations
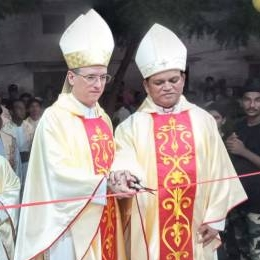
- El-Kassis (left) with Samson Shukardin, Archbishop of Hyderabad, in 2022
- Appointed: 25 July 2026
- Predecessor: Gabriele Caccia
- Other post: Titular Archbishop of Rusellae
- Previous posts: Apostolic Nuncio to Pakistan (2018–2023); Apostolic Nuncio to United Arab Emirates (2023–2026); Apostolic Nuncio to Yemen and Apostolic Delegate to the Arabian Peninsula (2024–2026)

Orders
- Ordination: 21 May 1994 by Khalil Abi-Nader
- Consecration: 19 January 2019 by Pietro Parolin, Dominique Mamberti and Paul Youssef Matar

Personal details
- Born: 24 August 1968 (age 58) Beirut, Lebanon
- Denomination: Maronite Catholic Church
- Motto: Scis Domine, quia amo te
- Coat of arms: Christophe Zakhia El-Kassis's coat of arms

Ordination history of Christophe Zakhia El-Kassis
History
Priestly ordination
- Ordained by: Khalil Abi-Nader
- Date: 21 May 1994
- Place: Maronite Cathedral of Saint George, Beirut
Episcopal consecration
- Principal consecrator: Pietro Parolin
- Co-consecrators: Dominique Mamberti; Paul Youssef Matar
- Date: 19 January 2019
Episcopal succession
Bishops consecrated by Christophe Zakhia El-Kassis as principal consecrator
- Khalid Rehmat, O.F.M. Cap.: 2021
- Yousaf Sohan, O.F.M. Cap.: 2023

Styles of Christophe Zakhia El-Kassis
- Reference style: His Excellency; His Grace
- Spoken style: Your Excellency
- Religious style: Archbishop

Christophe Zakhia El-Kassis (born 24 August 1968) is a Lebanese Catholic archbishop and diplomat of the Holy See. He has been a nuncio since 2018 and has served as the Permanent Observer of the Holy See to the United Nations since July 2026.

== Early years ==
Christophe Zakhia El-Kassis was born in Beirut on 24 August 1968. He earned a doctorate in both civil law and church law. He was ordained a priest for the Maronite Archeparchy of Beirut on 21 May 1994. He is fluent in Lebanese, Arabic, French, Italian, English, Indonesian, Spanish, and German

== Diplomatic career ==
He joined the diplomatic service of the Holy See on 19 June 2000 and served in the Apostolic Nunciatures in Indonesia, Sudan, and Turkey. From 2007 until 2018, he worked at the Foreign Relations office of the Secretariat of State in the Holy See, where he had responsibility for the Arab nations.

On 24 November 2018, Pope Francis appointed him as Titular Archbishop of Rusellae and named him Apostolic Nuncio to Pakistan. He received his episcopal consecration in St. Peter's Basilica on 19 January 2019 from Cardinal Pietro Parolin, with Cardinal Dominique Mamberti and Archbishop Paul Youssef Matar as co-consecrators.

On 3 January 2023, Pope Francis appointed him the Apostolic Nuncio to the United Arab Emirates. He was the first nuncio to become a resident in the nunciature in Abu Dhabi, which opened in February 2022.

In May 2024, he participated in a penal discussion of the Document on Human Fraternity at the Abu Dhabi International Book Fair. He said it "represents a pioneering approach for individuals and communities that focuses on human respect and concern for the interests of others". He reported that the Holy See was promoting it "by engaging with institutions, organizations, decision-makers, and others to integrate it into educational systems".

On 22 July 2024, Pope Francis added to his responsibilities those of nuncio to Yemen and Apostolic Delegate to the Arabian Peninsula

On 25 July 2026, Pope Leo XIV appointed him Permanent Observer of the Holy See to the United Nations in New York.

== See also ==
- List of heads of the diplomatic missions of the Holy See

Catholic Church titles
Diplomatic posts
Preceded by Ghaleb Moussa Abdalla Bader	Apostolic Nuncio to Pakistan; 2018 – 2023	Succeeded by Germano Penemote
Preceded by Francisco Montecillo Padilla	Apostolic Nuncio to United Arab Emirates; 2023 – 2026	Succeeded by Grzegorz Piotr Bielaszka
Preceded by Francisco Montecillo Padilla	Apostolic Nuncio to Yemen and Apostolic Delegate to the Arabian Peninsula; 2024 – 2026	Succeeded by Grzegorz Piotr Bielaszka
Preceded by Gabriele Caccia	Permanent Observer of the Holy See to the United Nations; 2026 – present	Incumbent
