= Apostolic Nunciature to Qatar =

Diplomatic post of the Holy See for Qatar

The Apostolic Nunciature to Qatar is an ecclesiastical office of the Catholic Church in Qatar. It is a diplomatic post of the Holy See, whose representative is called the Apostolic Nuncio with the rank of an ambassador. The Apostolic Nuncio to Kuwait, who resides in Kuwait City, also serves as the Apostolic Nuncio to Qatar.

Before the Holy See and Qatar established diplomatic relations, the Holy See represented its interests in Qatar through delegations with regional responsibilities, first the Apostolic Delegation to the Red Sea Region established by Pope Paul VI on 3 July 1969 and then the Apostolic Delegation to the Arabian Peninsula established by Pope John Paul II on 26 March 1992. The Holy See and Qatar established diplomatic relations on 18 November 2002.

== Papal representatives to Qatar ==
- Giuseppe De Andrea (29 November 2003 – 27 August 2005)
- Paul-Mounged El-Hachem (27 August 2005 – 2 December 2009)
- Petar Rajič (2 December 2009 – 15 June 2015)
- Francisco Montecillo Padilla (6 May 2017 – 17 April 2020)
- Eugene Nugent (7 January 2021 – 25 May 2026)
