= Saverio Zupi =

Italian prelate

Saverio Zupi (9 January 1914 – 1 March 1983) was an Italian prelate of the Catholic Church who worked in the diplomatic service of the Holy See from 1943 to 1966.

== Biography ==
Saverio Zupi was born on 9 January 1914 in Cerisano, Italy. He was ordained a priest on 19 December 1936. He studied at the Almo Collegio Capranica in Rome.

To prepare for a diplomatic career he entered the Pontifical Ecclesiastical Academy in 1938. He joined the diplomatic service in 1943, working first in the offices of the Secretariat of State. His overseas postings then took him to Costa Rica, Lebanon, and Belgium before his returned to the Secretariat for a time.

On 26 October 1960, Pope John XXIII named him Apostolic Delegate to Korea.

While Zupi was serving in Korea, Pope John named him titular archbishop of Serra. He received his episcopal consecration on 14 January 1962 from Archbishop Domenico Picchinenna of Cosenza and on 31 January 1962, Pope John appointed him Apostolic Internuncio to Pakistan. His title changed to Apostolic Pro-Nuncio with the erection of the Nunciature to Pakistan on 27 December 1965.

On 30 August 1966, Pope Paul VI named him Apostolic Pro-Nuncio to Turkey.

On 17 May 1969, Pope Paul named him Apostolic Nuncio to Malta. Illness prevented him from traveling to Malta and forced him to resign and retire at the age of 56. (Note: His successor, Giuseppe Mojoli, was appointed to Malta on 14 November 1969.)

He died on 1 March 1983.
