= Alfred Xuereb =

Maltese prelate of the Catholic Church (born 1958)

His Excellency The Most Reverend Alfred Xuereb
- Apostolic Nuncio to Morocco; Titular Archbishop of Amantia
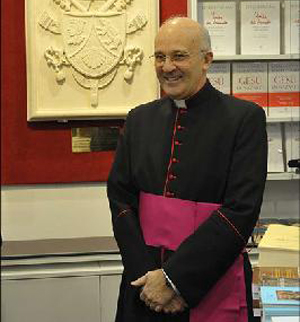
- Church: Catholic Church
- Appointed: 8 December 2023
- Predecessor: Osvaldo Padilla
- Other post: Titular Archbishop of Amantia
- Previous posts: General Secretary of the Secretariat for the Economy (2014-18); Apostolic Nuncio to South Korea and Mongolia (2018-2023)

Orders
- Ordination: 26 May 1984 by Nikol Joseph Cauchi
- Consecration: 19 March 2018 by Pope Francis, Pietro Parolin and Fernando Filoni

Personal details
- Born: Alfred Xuereb; 14 October 1958 (age 67) Victoria, Gozo, Malta
- Education: Pontifical Theological Faculty Teresianum
- Motto: Ut Unum sint
- Coat of arms

Styles of Alfred Xuereb
- Reference style: His Excellency; The Most Reverend
- Spoken style: Your Excellency
- Religious style: Archbishop

Alfred Xuereb (born 14 October 1958) is a Maltese prelate of the Catholic Church who works in the diplomatic service of the Holy See. He previously worked in the Roman Curia and was a private secretary to Pope Benedict XVI from 2007 to 2013 and to Pope Francis from 2013 to 2014.

== Biography ==
Alfred Xuereb was born in Victoria (known also as Rabat) on the Maltese island of Gozo on 14 October 1958. He studied philosophy and Roman Catholic theology in Malta and was ordained a priest of the Diocese of Gozo on 26 May 1984. He then studied at the Pontifical Theological Faculty Teresianum where he earned a doctorate in theology, specialising in spirituality, with a thesis on “The Easter mystery in Christian Life”.

He returned to pastoral service in Malta for several years. In September 1991 he joined the staff of the rector of the Pontifical Lateran University in Rome. He entered the service of the General Affairs Section of the Secretariat of State on 1 September 1995.

In November 2000 he joined the Prefecture of the Papal Household. Pope John Paul II awarded him the papal title of Honorary Prelate on 9 September 2003.

In 2007, Pope Benedict XVI appointed Xuereb his second private secretary, succeeding Mieczysław Mokrzycki as his second private secretary. He accompanied the Pope on his trips. After the election of Pope Francis in 2013, Xuereb became his first private secretary.

On 28 November 2013, Pope Francis appointed him a delegate for the Pontifical Commission investigating the Institute for the Works of Religion (IOR) and for the Pontifical Commission on the Organisation of the Economic-Administrative Structure of the Holy See. He was tasked with keeping the Pope informed of their procedures and initiatives. Continuing to place Xuereb in positions crucial to financial reform, on 3 March 2014, Pope Francis appointed him the first Secretary General of the Secretariat for the Economy, a new department of the Roman Curia.

== Diplomatic career ==
On 26 February 2018, Pope Francis appointed Xuereb titular archbishop of Amantea and apostolic nuncio for both South Korea and Mongolia. Xuereb was consecrated bishop on 19 March 2018 in St. Peter's Basilica by Pope Francis. He chose as his episcopal motto Ut Unum Sint, "that all may be one".

Speaking of the 2018 Trump-Kim summit, Xuereb said that the Korean people and the local Church had been anxiously awaiting “these truly historic events”. He described the summit between U.S. President Donald Trump and the North Korean leader Kim Jong-un as “marking an important page at the beginning of a long and arduous road”.

On 8 December 2023, Pope Francis appointed him as the new Apostolic Nuncio to Morocco.

== Personal life ==
During a meeting with trainee clergy and novices in July 2013, Pope Francis referred with admiration to the fact that Xuereb uses a bicycle for transportation.

== Honours ==
- South Korea: Gwanghwa Medal (First Class) of the Order of Diplomatic Service Merit

== See also ==
- List of heads of the diplomatic missions of the Holy See

== Sources ==
Diplomatic posts
Preceded by Osvaldo Padilla	Apostolic Nuncio to Korea and Mongolia; 26 February 2018 – 19 June 2023	Succeeded by Giovanni Gaspari
Catholic Church titles
Preceded by Georg Gänswein	Private Secretary to the Pope; 18 March 2013 – 2 March 2014	Succeeded by Fabián Pedacchio
