= Vannida =

The diocese of Vannida Latin: Dioecesis Vannidensis) is a suppressed and titular see of the Roman Catholic Church. It was centered on the ancient Roman town of Vannida, in what is today Algeria, is an ancient episcopal seat of the Roman province of Mauretania Caesariensis.

The only known bishop of this diocese was Rogaziano, who took part in the synod assembled in Carthage in 484 by the Vandal King Huneric, after which Rogaziano was exiled. Today Vannida survives as a titular bishopric and the current archbishop is Kryspin Witold Dubiel.
