= Franco Brambilla (nuncio) =

Italian prelate

- Titular Archbishop of Viminacium
- Church: Catholic Church
- In office: 24 December 1970 – 28 July 2003
- Predecessor: Jean-Baptiste Boivin
- Successor: Stanisław Wielgus
- Previous posts: Apostolic Pro-Nuncio to Australia (1986-1998); Apostolic Nuncio to Uruguay (1981-1986); Apostolic Pro-Nuncio to Tanzania (1970-1981)

Orders
- Ordination: 29 August 1947 by Alfredo Ildefonso Schuster
- Consecration: 14 February 1971 by Jean-Marie Villot

Personal details
- Born: 27 January 1923 Brugherio, Kingdom of Italy
- Died: 28 July 2003 (aged 80)

Franco Brambilla (27 November 1923 – 28 July 2003) was an Italian prelate of the Catholic Church who worked in the diplomatic service of the Holy See.

== Life ==
Brambilla was born in Brugherio on 27 November 1923 and was ordained a priest on 29 August 1947.

To prepare for a diplomatic career he entered the Pontifical Ecclesiastical Academy in 1950. His early assignments in the diplomatic service included a stint in the United States.

He was appointed Titular Archbishop of Viminacium and Apostolic Pro-Nuncio to Tanzania on 24 December 1970.

On 21 November 1981 he became the Apostolic Nuncio to Uruguay.

His final appointment was on 22 February 1986 as Apostolic Pro-Nuncio to Australia. He retired on 3 December 1998 with the appointment of Francesco Canalini to succeed him in Australia.

He died on 28 July 2003.
