= Apostolic Nunciature to Tanzania =

Diplomatic mission of the Holy See in East Africa

The Apostolic Nunciature to Tanzania is an ecclesiastical office of the Catholic Church in Tanzania. It is a diplomatic post of the Holy See, whose representative is called the Apostolic Nuncio with the rank of an ambassador.

== Representatives of the Holy See to Tanzania ==
Apostolic pro-nuncios

- Pierluigi Sartorelli (19 April 1968 - 22 December 1970)
- Franco Brambilla (24 December 1970 - 21 November 1981)

Apostolic nuncios

- Gian Vincenzo Moreni (29 April 1982 - 8 September 1990)
- Agostino Marchetto (7 December 1990 - 18 May 1994)
- Francisco-Javier Lozano Sebastián (9 July 1994 - 20 March 1999)
- Luigi Pezzuto (22 May 1999 - 2 April 2005)
- Joseph Chennoth (15 June 2005 - 15 August 2011)
- Francisco Montecillo Padilla (10 November 2011 - 5 April 2016)
- Marek Solczyński (25 April 2017 - 2 February 2022)
- Angelo Accattino (2 January 2023 - 15 August 2026)

== See also ==
- Foreign relations of the Holy See
- List of diplomatic missions of the Holy See
