= Marie Keyrouz =

Lebanese chanter of Oriental Church music

Sister Marie Keyrouz (also spelled "Kairouz") (Arabic: ماري كيروز; born 1963) is a Lebanese chanter of Oriental Church music, a member of the Congrégation des Soeurs Basiliennes Chouérites and founder-president of the National Institute of Sacred Music in Paris.

== Biography ==
She was born in Deir el Ahmar in Lebanon, close to the ancient Roman city of Baalbeck. Raised in the Maronite Church, but being a Melkite through her religious congregation, she took her vows in the Melkite Greek Catholic Church. From an early age, she undertook several disciplines of study simultaneously, earning a joint doctorate in musicology and anthropology from the Sorbonne in 1991. She has collected a variety of "Oriental" Christian chants, mostly preserved in Greek, Syriac, and Arabic manuscripts and through oral tradition.

Her debut album Chant byzantin took Europe by surprise upon its arrival in 1989, not only with the apparently ancient repertoire it represents, but also due to her own virtuosity, having a great ability to sing the intervals in rapid flourishes, notes that are difficult for most singers to reproduce. Her repertoire ranges from the Classical Arabic vocal music to western Classical operatic soprano.

== See also ==
- Syrian chant
