= Abdulaziz Nasser Al Shamsi =

Emirati diplomat

Abdulaziz Nasser Al Shamsi (Arabic: عبدالعزيز ناصر الشامسي) is an Emirati career diplomat who served as the previous Emirati ambassador to Italy, France, Brazil, and non-resident ambassador to Switzerland, Argentine, and Chile as well as the Permanent Representative of the United Arab Emirates to the United Nations.

== Early life and education ==
Al Shamsi who was born in Ajman in 1956. He obtained his bachelor's degree in business administration at the University of Cairo in 1980.

== Diplomatic career ==
Al Shamsi became the resident ambassador to Brazil in 1991. He also became the non-resident ambassador to Argentina in 1993 and then served as the non-resident ambassador to Chile as well during the same year. His ambassadorship to the three countries ended on 1994.

Al Shamsi then served as the ambassador to France from 1995 to 1999, at the same time he also served as the UAE Permanent Representative to UNESCO. He then served as the non-resident ambassador to Switzerland from 1997 to 1999.

Al Shamsi served as Permanent Representative of the UAE to the United Nations from September 2001 to July 2007. He then served as the ambassador to Italy from 2009 to 2013.

== Personal life ==
He is married to Emirati career diplomat Hissa Abdulla Ahmed Al-Otaiba.

== Awards and honors ==
- The Légion d'honneur from the President of France in 1999, in appreciation of his efforts towards promoting excellent relations between the UAE and France.
- The Order of Rio Branco of the Order of the Grand Cross from the President of Brazil in 1994.
