= Apostolic Nunciature to São Tomé and Príncipe =

Diplomatic mission of the Holy See in Africa

The Apostolic Nunciature to São Tomé and Príncipe is an ecclesiastical office of the Catholic Church in São Tomé and Príncipe. It is a diplomatic post of the Holy See, whose representative is called the Apostolic Nuncio with the rank of an ambassador. The title Apostolic Nuncio to São Tomé and Príncipe is held by the prelate appointed Apostolic Nuncio to Angola; he resides in Angola.

The Holy See and São Tomé and Príncipe established diplomatic relations on 12 December 1984, and the Holy See established its Nunciature to São Tomé and Príncipe on 21 December 1984.

== List of papal representatives to São Tomé and Príncipe ==
Apostolic Pro-Nuncios

- Fortunato Baldelli (4 May 1985 - 20 April 1991)
- Félix del Blanco Prieto (31 May 1991 - 4 May 1996)

Apostolic Nuncios

- Aldo Cavalli (2 July 1996 - 28 June 2001)
- Giovanni Angelo Becciu (15 November 2001 - 23 July 2009)
- Novatus Rugambwa (6 February 2010 - 5 March 2015)
- Petar Rajič (15 June 2015 - 15 June 2019)
- Giovanni Gaspari (21 September 2020 – 2 March 2024)
- Kryspin Witold Dubiel (15 July 2024 – present)
