= Hissa Abdulla Ahmed Al-Otaiba =

Dr. Hissa Abdulla Ahmed Al-Otaiba
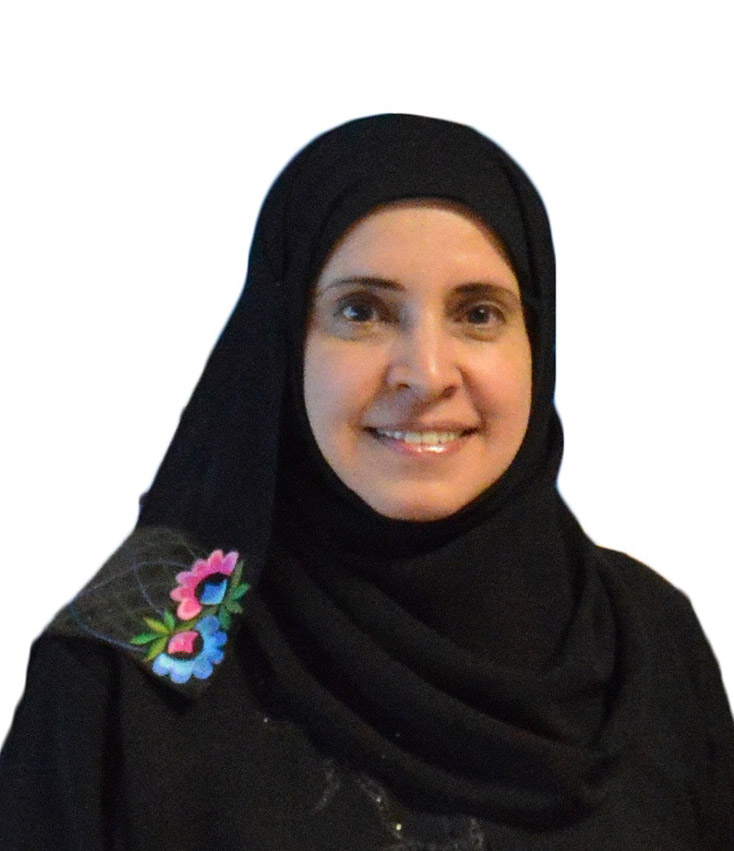
- Hissa Abdulla Ahmed Al-Otaiba

Ambassador of the United Arab Emirates to Switzerland
- President: Sheikh Khalifa bin Zayed Al Nahyan

Personal details
- Spouse: Abdulaziz Nasser Al Shamsi

Hissa Abdulla Ahmed Al-Otaiba is a diplomat from the United Arab Emirates who has been its ambassador to Switzerland since June 2022, having previously held this position in the Netherlands. As of 2012 she was ambassador to the Holy See. Al-Otaiba was born in Abu Dhabi and has lived in Egypt, Tunisia, Brazil, France, New York City, Spain, Switzerland and the Netherlands. Al Otaiba's husband, Abdulaziz Al Shamsi, is the UAE Ambassador to Italy.

She earned her PhD in Business Administration from Business School Lausanne, a master's degree in Computer Administration from Webster University and a bachelor's degree in Commerce and Business Administration from Cairo University.

== Career ==
Al-Otaiba became the first female ambassador of the UAE when she was appointed ambassador to Spain in 2008

Al-Otaiba presented her credentials to Pope Benedict XVI on May 20, 2010, making her the first UAE Ambassador to the Holy See.

She is a member of the International Forum for Women at the United Nations.
