= Mario Pio Gaspari =

Italian Roman Catholic priest

- Apostolic Pro-Nuncio to Japan
- Church: Catholic Church
- In office: 16 November 1977 – 23 June 1983
- Predecessor: Ippolito Rotoli
- Successor: William Aquin Carew
- Other post: Titular Archbishop of Numida (1973-1983)
- Previous post: Apostolic Delegate to Mexico (1973-1977)

Orders
- Ordination: 21 July 1940
- Consecration: 29 June 1973 by Pope Paul VI

Personal details
- Born: 8 April 1918 San Felice sul Panaro, Province of Modena, Kingdom of Italy
- Died: 23 June 1983 (aged 65)

Mario Pio Gaspari (8 April 1918 – 23 June 1983) was an Italian prelate of the Catholic Church who worked in the diplomatic service of the Holy See.

== Biography ==
Mario Pio Gaspari was born on 8 April 1918 in San Felice sul Panaro, Province of Modena. He was ordained a priest on 21 July 1940.

He entered the diplomatic service of the Holy See and devoted himself largely to Latin American affaires, serving in the nunciatures in Venezuela and Brazil. On 5 August 1967, Pope Paul named him to succeed Agostino Casaroli as Undersecretary of the Council for the Public Affairs of the Church (later merged into the Secretariat of State of the Holy See.

On 22 September 1972, the Italian government honor Grande Ufficiale Ordine al Merito della Repubblica Italiana

On 6 June 1973, Pope Paul VI appointed him Titular Archbishop of Numida and Apostolic Legate to Mexico. On 29 June 1973, he received his episcopal consecration from Pope Paul.

On 16 November 1977, Pope Paul named him Apostolic Pro-Nuncio to Japan. Pope John Paul II visited Japan in 1981 while Gaspari was nuncio there.

He died of heart failure on 23 June 1983 at the age of 65 and Japan's bishops celebrated a funeral Mass on 30 June. Casaroli, now a cardinal, spoke at his funeral in St. Peter's Basilica on 7 July 1983.
