= Francisco Montecillo Padilla =

Philippine prelate of the Catholic Church

His Excellency, The Most Reverend Francisco Montecillo Padilla
- Apostolic Nuncio of Guatemala; Titular Archbishop of Nebbio
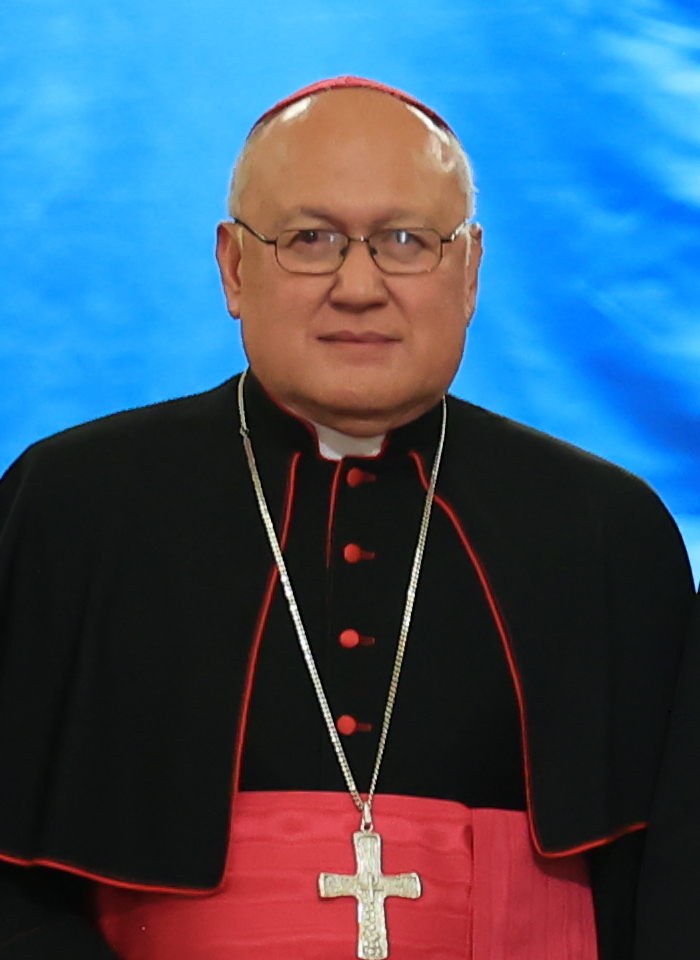
- Appointed: 17 April 2020
- Predecessor: Nicolas Thévenin
- Other post: Titular Archbishop of Nebbio
- Previous posts: Apostolic Nuncio to Kuwait, Bahrain, United Arab Emirates, Yemen, Qatar and Apostolic Delegate to the Arabian Peninsula (2016-2020); Apostolic Nuncio to Tanzania (2011-2016); Apostolic Nuncio to Papua New Guinea and Solomon Islands (2006-2011)

Orders
- Ordination: 21 October 1976 by Julio Rosales y Ras
- Consecration: 1 April 2006 by Ricardo Vidal

Personal details
- Born: September 17, 1953 (age 72) Cebu City, Philippines
- Denomination: Roman Catholic
- Motto: Servire in Caritate (Serving in Love)

Styles of Francisco Montecillo Padilla
- Reference style: His Excellency; The Most Reverend
- Spoken style: Your Excellency
- Religious style: Archbishop

Francisco Montecillo Padilla (born 17 September 1953) is a Philippine prelate of the Catholic Church who has worked in the diplomatic service of the Holy See since 1985. He represented the Holy See, either as Apostolic Nuncio or Apostolic Delegate, to the several countries on the Arabian Peninsula. On 17 April 2020, he was named Apostolic Nuncio to Guatemala.

== Biography ==
Francisco Montecillo Padilla was born on 17 September 1953 in Cebu City, Philippines, the tenth of thirteen siblings. He prepared for the priesthood in Cebu, first at the Pope John XIII Minor Seminary and then at the Major Seminary San Carlos. He earned his theology degrees at the University of Santo Tomas Central Seminary in Manila. He was ordained on 21 October 1976 by Cardinal Julio Rosales y Ras. He then continued his studies in Rome, earning degrees at Pontifical University of St. Thomas Aquinas.

== Diplomatic career ==
He entered the diplomatic service of the Holy See on 1 May 1985. His early assignments took him to Santo Domingo, Venezuela, Austria, India, and Japan.

He was based in Australia when, on 1 April 2006, Pope Benedict XVI appointed him Titular Archbishop of Nebbio and Apostolic Nuncio to Papua New Guinea and the Solomon Islands. On 23 May he received his episcopal consecration from Cardinal Ricardo J. Vidal.

On 10 November 2011, Pope Benedict named him Apostolic Nuncio to Tanzania.

Pope Francis appointed him Apostolic Nuncio to Kuwait and Apostolic Delegate to the Arabian Peninsula on 5 April 2016. He was also appointed Apostolic Nuncio to Bahrain and United Arab Emirates on 26 April 2016. On 30 July 2016, he was appointed Nuncio to Yemen. On 6 May 2017, he was also named Apostolic Nuncio to Qatar. (Note: As of May 2017, the countries of the Arabian Peninsula for which Padilla served as apostolic delegate rather than nuncio were Oman and Saudi Arabia.)

On 17 April 2020, he was named Apostolic Nuncio to Guatemala.

He is the younger brother of Archbishop Osvaldo Padilla, also a Nuncio.

== See also ==
- List of heads of the diplomatic missions of the Holy See

Catholic Church titles
Diplomatic posts
Previous: Adolfo Tito Yllana	Apostolic Nuncio to Papua New Guinea; 01 April 2006 – 10 November 2011	Next: Santo Rocco Gangemi
Previous: Adolfo Tito Yllana	Apostolic Nuncio to Solomon Islands; 01 April 2006 – 10 November 2011	Next: Santo Rocco Gangemi
Preceded by Joseph Chennoth	Apostolic Nuncio to Tanzania; 10 November 2011 - 5 April 2016	Succeeded by Marek Solczyński
Previous: Petar Rajič	Apostolic Nuncio to Kuwait; 05 April 2016 - 17 April 2020	Next: Eugene Nugent
Previous: Petar Rajič	Apostolic Nuncio to Bahrain; 26 April 2016 - 17 April 2020	Next: Eugene Nugent
Previous: Petar Rajič	Apostolic Nuncio to Qatar; 06 May 2017 - 17 April 2020	Next: Eugene Nugent
Previous: Petar Rajič	Apostolic Nuncio to United Arab Emirates; 26 April 2016 - 17 April 2020	Next: Christophe Zakhia El-Kassis
Previous: Petar Rajič	Apostolic Nuncio to Yemen; 30 July 2016 - 17 April 2020	Vacant
Previous: Petar Rajič	Apostolic Delegate to the Arabian Peninsula; 05 April 2016 - 17 April 2020	Vacant
Preceded by Joseph Chennoth	Apostolic Nuncio to Guatemala; 17 April 2020	Incumbent
