= Apostolic Nunciature to South Korea =

Diplomatic post of the Holy See

Apostolic Nunciature to Korea
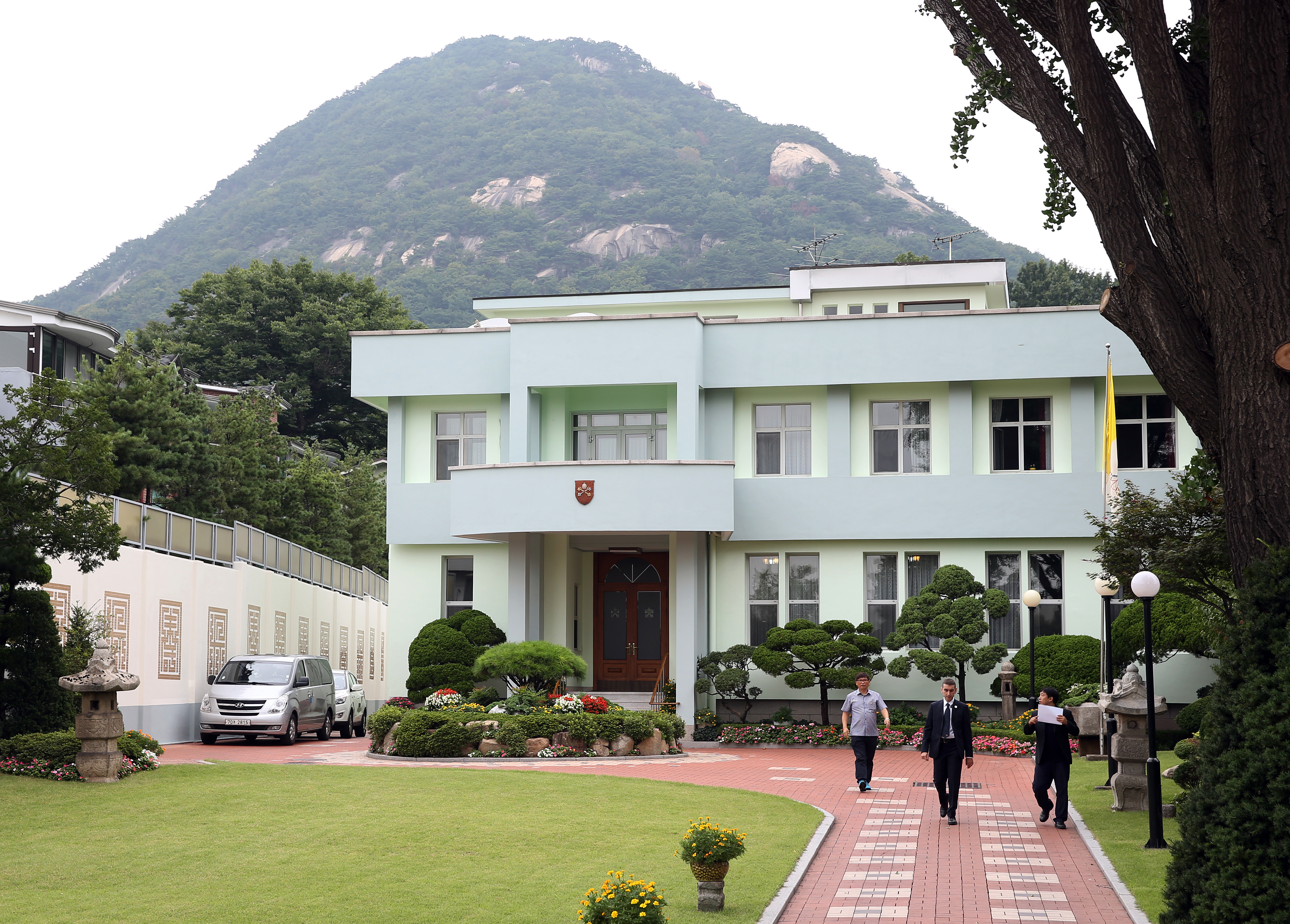
- Location: Seoul, South Korea
- Address: Gungjeong-dong, Jongno District
- Apostolic Nuncio: Giovanni Gaspari

The Apostolic Nunciature to Korea (Latin: Nuntiatura Apostolica in Corea, Korean: 주한 교황청 대사관) is an ecclesiastical office of the Catholic Church in South Korea. It is a diplomatic post of the Holy See, whose representative is called the Apostolic Nuncio with the rank of an ambassador. The nuncio resides in Seoul.

The Holy See consistently refers to Korea when making appointments, never South Korea or North Korea. The Holy See has no relationship with the government of North Korea; in 2018, North Korean leader Kim Jong Un's invitation to Pope Francis to visit North Korea was relayed through South Korean President Moon Jae-in.

The Internunciature to Korea was created on 11 December 1963. and made the Nunciature to Korea on 5 September 1966.

The Apostolic Nuncio to South Korea is usually also the Apostolic Nuncio to Mongolia upon his appointment to said nation.

== List of papal representatives to Korea ==
Apostolic Delegates

- Patrick James Byrne (7 April 1949 – 25 November 1950)
- Egano Righi-Lambertini (28 December 1957 – 9 July 1960)
- Saverio Zupi (26 October 1960 – 31 January 1962)
- Antonio del Giudice (18 April 1962 – 19 August 1967)

Apostolic Pro-Nuncios

- Ippolito Rotoli (2 September 1967 – 15 November 1972)
- Luigi Dossena (27 February 1973 – 24 October 1978)
- Luciano Angeloni (25 November 1978 – 23 August 1981)
- Francesco Monterisi (24 December 1981 – 19 June 1986)

Apostolic Nuncios

- Ivan Dias (20 June 1986 – 28 October 1991)
- John Bulaitis (30 November 1991 – 25 March 1997)
- Giovanni Battista Morandini (23 April 1997 – 6 March 2004)
- Emil Paul Tscherrig (22 May 2004 – 26 January 2008)
- Osvaldo Padilla (12 April 2008 – 15 September 2017)
- Alfred Xuereb (26 February 2018 – 8 December 2023)
- Giovanni Gaspari (2 March 2024 – present)

== See also ==
- Catholic Bishops' Conference of Korea
- Catholic Church in North Korea
- Catholic Church in South Korea
