= Apostolic Nunciature to Pakistan =

Diplomatic Mission of the Holy See

The Apostolic Nunciature to Pakistan is an ecclesiastical office of the Catholic Church in Pakistan. It is a diplomatic post of the Holy See, whose representative is called the Apostolic Nuncio with the rank of an ambassador.

The Nunciature was located in St. Anthony’s Parish (Karachi) in its Chancellery at old Clifton when the Vatican established diplomatic relations with Pakistan in 1950. When the capital of Pakistan was moved to Islamabad in 1965, the Nunciature was re-located to the Diplomatic Enclave in Islamabad.

Following the partition of India and the formation of the independent nation of Pakistan in 1947, the Holy See established the Delegation to Pakistan on 15 July 1950 and named as first delegate James Cornelius van Miltenburg, Archbishop of Karachi. On 9 October 1951, it erected in its place the Internunciature to Pakistan. Pope Paul VI established the Apostolic Nunciature to Pakistan on 27 December 1965.

== List of papal representatives to Pakistan ==
Apostolic Delegates

- James Cornelius van Miltenburg (17 September 1950 – 9 October 1951)
  - From the erection of the internunciature on 9 October 1951, van Miltenburg was its chargé d’affaires and the position of internuncio remained vacant. He was transferred to the new Diocese of Hyderabad on 7 May 1958.

Apostolic Internuncios

- Emanuele Clarizio (10 July 1958 (Note: Clarizio was not a bishop; he was titled "Filio" in the document that erected the Diocese of Lyallpur (later Faisalabad) on 13 April 1960.) – 5 October 1961)
- Saverio Zupi (31 January 1962 - 27 December 1965)

Apostolic Pro-Nuncios

- Saverio Zupi (27 December 1965 – 30 August 1966)
- Costante Maltoni (2 January 1967 - 1970)
- Josip Uhač (23 June 1970 – 7 October 1976)
- Giulio Einaudi (10 November 1976 – 5 August 1980)
- Emanuele Gerada (15 October 1980 – 4 February 1989)
- Luigi Bressan (3 April 1989 – 26 July 1993)
- Renzo Fratini (7 August 1993 – 8 August 1998)

Apostolic Nuncios

- Alessandro D'Errico (14 November 1998 – 21 November 2005)
- Adolfo Tito Yllana (31 March 2006 – 20 November 2010)
- Edgar Peña Parra (2 February 2011 - 21 February 2015)
- Ghaleb Moussa Abdalla Bader (23 May 2015 – 24 August 2017)
- Christophe Zakhia El-Kassis (24 November 2018 – 3 January 2023)
- Germano Penemote (16 June 2023 – present)

== See also ==
- Holy See – Pakistan relations
