= Fortunato Baldelli =

Italian prelate

His Eminence Fortunato Baldelli
- Major Penitentiary
- See: Major Penitentiary of the Apostolic Penitentiary
- Appointed: 2 June 2009
- Term ended: 5 January 2012
- Predecessor: James Francis Stafford
- Successor: Manuel Monteiro de Castro
- Other posts: Cardinal-Deacon of S. Anselmo all’Aventino, Apostolic Nuncio to France, Apostolic Nuncio to Peru
- Previous posts: Titular Archbishop of Mevania (1983–2010); Apostolic Delegate to Angola (1983–1991); Apostolic Pro-Nuncio to São Tomé and Príncipe (1983–1991); Apostolic Nuncio to Dominican Republic (1991–1993); Apostolic Nuncio to Peru (1993–1999); Apostolic Nuncio to France (1999–2009)

Orders
- Ordination: 18 March 1961 by Giuseppe Placido Maria Nicolini
- Consecration: 23 April 1983 by Agostino Casaroli
- Created cardinal: 20 November 2010 by Pope Benedict XVI
- Rank: Cardinal-Deacon

Personal details
- Born: Fortunato Baldelli; 6 August 1935 Valfabbrica, Italy
- Died: 20 September 2012 (aged 77) Rome Italy
- Denomination: Roman Catholic
- Coat of arms

Styles of Fortunato Baldelli
- Reference style: His Eminence
- Spoken style: Your Eminence
- Informal style: Cardinal

Fortunato Baldelli (6 August 1935 – 20 September 2012) was an Italian prelate of the Catholic Church who was appointed a cardinal in 2010 after a career in the diplomatic service of the Holy See from 1966 to 2009 that included ten years as Apostolic Nuncio to France. He was also the Major Penitentiary of the Apostolic Penitentiary from 2009 to 2012.

== Biography ==
After finishing his primary education, he entered the Seminary of Assisi in 1947, where he finished his secondary education. He was able to continue his education through the death of his parents with the help of his brothers and the assistance of Bishop Placido Nicolini of Assisi. In 1957, Nicolini sent him to the Major Roman Seminary; he attended the Pontifical Lateran University and obtained a licentiate in theology. He earned a doctorate in canon law. Baldelli was ordained priest for the Diocese of Assisi-Nocera Umbra-Gualdo Tadino on 18 March 1961. From 1961 to 1964, he was vice-rector of the Minor Seminary of Assisi.

To prepare for a diplomat's career he entered the Pontifical Ecclesiastical Academy in 1964. He joined the diplomatic service of the Holy See in 1966. His early postings include positions in the missions in Cuba from 1966 to 1970 and the United Arab Republic (Egypt) from 1970 to 1974; in the offices of the Secretariat of State and the Council for the Public Affairs of the Church.

On 12 February 1983, Pope John Paul II appointed him Titular Archbishop of Mevania and apostolic delegate to Angola. He was given additional responsibilities as Apostolic Pro-Nuncio to São Tomé and Príncipe on 4 May 1985.

On 20 April 1991, Pope John Paul named him Apostolic Nuncio to the Dominican Republic.

On 23 April 1994, he was appointed Apostolic Nuncio to Peru.

He was appointed apostolic nuncio to France on 19 June 1999.

He was appointed Major Penitentiary of the Apostolic Penitentiary on 2 June 2009 by Pope Benedict XVI. He was appointed a member of the Congregation for the Causes of Saints on 24 July 2010 for the usual five-year term.

Baldelli was present at the coronation of Albert II, Prince of Monaco as non-resident Apostolic Nuncio to Monaco, and read a letter of good wishes and blessing from Pope Benedict XVI.

On 20 October 2010 Pope Benedict announced that he would make him a cardinal in a consistory on 20 November. He was created Cardinal-Deacon of Sant'Anselmo all'Aventino.

In December 2010 Baldelli was appointed a member of the Congregation for the Causes of Saints. On 29 January 2011, he was appointed a member of Secretariat of State (second section).

He retired on 5 January 2012 with the appointment of Archbishop Manuel Monteiro de Castro as his successor.

Baldelli died on 20 September 2012 at Domus Internationalis Paulus VI, where he lived during the last years of his life.

Catholic Church titles
| Preceded by Luigi Dossena | Apostolic Nuncio to Peru; 23 April 1993 – 19 June 1999 | Succeeded by Rino Passigato |
| Preceded by Mario Tagliaferri | Apostolic Nuncio to France; 19 June 1999 – 2 June 2009 | Succeeded by Luigi Ventura |
| Preceded by James Francis Stafford | Major Penitentiary of the Apostolic Penitentiary; 2 June 2009 – 5 January 2012 | Succeeded by Manuel Monteiro de Castro |
