= Osvaldo Padilla =

Filipino prelate

His Excellency, The Most Reverend Osvaldo Padilla
- Apostolic Nuncio emeritus to South Korea and Mongolia; Titular Archbishop of Pia
- Appointed: 12 April 2008
- Retired: 15 September 2017
- Predecessor: Emil Paul Tscherrig
- Successor: Alfred Xuereb
- Other post: Titular Archbishop of Pia
- Previous posts: Apostolic Nuncio to Costa Rica (2003-2008); Apostolic Nuncio to Nigeria (1998-2003); Apostolic Nuncio to Sri Lanka (1994-1998); Apostolic Nuncio to Panama (1990-1994)

Orders
- Ordination: 20 February 1966
- Consecration: 6 January 1991 by Pope John Paul II, Giovanni Battista Re and Justin Francis Rigali

Personal details
- Born: 5 August 1942 (age 83) Sogod, Philippines
- Denomination: Roman Catholic
- Motto: Hugot sa pagla-um

Styles of Osvaldo Montecillo Padilla
- Reference style: His Excellency; The Most Reverend
- Spoken style: Your Excellency
- Religious style: Archbishop

Osvaldo Montecillo Padilla (born 15 August 1942) is a Philippine prelate of the Catholic Church who spent his career in the diplomatic service of the Holy See. He became an archbishop in 1991 and held the position of Apostolic Nuncio to several countries before retiring in 2017.

== Biography ==
He was born on 5 August 1942 in Sogod, Cebu, Philippines.

== Diplomatic career ==
On 17 December 1990, Pope John Paul II named him titular archbishop of Pia and Apostolic Nuncio to Panama. He received his episcopal consecration on 6 January 1991 from John Paul. In 1994, he was appointed Nuncio to Sri Lanka. On 22 August 1998, he was named Nuncio to Nigeria.

On 31 July 2003, he was appointed Nuncio to Costa Rica, and on 12 April 2008 Nuncio to Korea. On 26 April 2008, he was assigned in addition the position of Nuncio to Mongolia.

He retired on 15 September 2017. In retirement he lives in the Philippines.

He is the elder brother of Archbishop Francisco Padilla, also a Nuncio.

== See also ==
- List of heads of the diplomatic missions of the Holy See
