= Apostolic Nunciature to Yemen =

Diplomatic mission of the Holy See in the Middle East

The Apostolic Nunciature to Yemen is an ecclesiastical office of the Catholic Church in Yemen. It is a diplomatic post of the Holy See, whose representative is called the Apostolic Nuncio with the rank of an ambassador. The Apostolic Nuncio to Yemen is also the Apostolic Nuncio to United Arab Emirates and resides in the United Arab Emirates.

Before the Holy See and Yemen established diplomatic relations, the Holy See represented its interests in Yemen through delegations with regional responsibilities, first the Apostolic Delegation to the Red Sea Region established by Pope Paul VI on 3 July 1969 and then the Apostolic Delegation to the Arabian Peninsula established by Pope John Paul II on 26 March 1992. The Holy See and Yemen established diplomatic relations on 13 October 1998.

== Papal representatives to Yemen ==
- Giuseppe De Andrea (28 June 2001 – 27 August 2005)
- Paul-Mounged El-Hachem (27 August 2005 – 2 December 2009)
- Petar Rajič (27 March 2010 – 15 June 2015)
- Francisco Montecillo Padilla (30 July 2016 – 17 April 2020)
- Christophe Zakhia El-Kassis (22 July 2024 – 25 July 2026)
