= Luis Robles Díaz =

Mexican prelate (1938–2007)

Luis Robles Díaz Infante (6 March 1938 – 7 April 2007) was a Mexican prelate of the Catholic Church who worked in the diplomatic service of the Holy See.

== Biography ==
Luis Robles Díaz Infante was born in El Grullo, Jalisco, Mexico, on 6 March 1938. He was ordained a priest on 14 April 1963.

To prepare for a diplomatic career he entered the Pontifical Ecclesiastical Academy in 1965. He entered the diplomatic service of the Holy See in 1967 and fulfilled assignments in Honduras, South Africa, Ethiopia, Sri Lanka, Ecuador, and Colombia.

On 16 February 1985, Pope John Paul II named him a titular archbishop, Apostolic Nuncio to Sudan, and Apostolic Delegate to the Red Sea Region. He received his episcopal consecration from Cardinal Ernesto Corripio y Ahumada on 9 April 1985.

On 13 March 1990, Pope John Paul appointed him Apostolic Pro-Nuncio to Uganda.

On 6 March 1999, Pope John Paul named him Apostolic Nuncio to Cuba.

On 4 October 2003, he was named Vice President of the Pontifical Commission for Latin America.

Robles Diáz died in the Vatican on 7 April 2007 at the age of 69.
