= Apostolic Delegation to the Arabian Peninsula =

Diplomatic Mission of the Holy See

The Apostolic Delegation to the Arabian Peninsula, originally the Apostolic Delegation to the Red Sea Region, represents the interests of the Holy See to officials of the Catholic Church, civil society, and government offices to several nations in the region. The Holy See and the governments of those countries have not established diplomatic relations and the position of Apostolic Delegate is not a diplomatic one, though the Delegate is a member of the diplomatic service of the Holy See.

Pope Paul VI established the Delegation to the Red Sea Region seated in Khartoum, Sudan, on 3 July 1969, with responsibility for Sudan, Somalia, the French Territory of the Afars and the Issas (present-day Djibouti), and the Arabian peninsula. With the creation of the Nunciature to Sudan in 1972, the same prelate held both titles until the Secretariat of State made more general changes in 1992.

Pope John Paul II created two separate Apostolic Delegations to Djibouti and to Somalia and renamed the Delegation to the Red Sea Region the Delegation to the Arabian Peninsula, now based in Kuwait City, on 26 March 1992, detailing its responsibilities as Saudi Arabia, Qatar, Bahrain, United Arab Emirates, Oman, and Yemen. The Delegate to the Arabian Peninsula is also the Apostolic Nuncio to United Arab Emirates; he resides in the United Arab Emirates.

With the establishment of diplomatic relations between the Holy See and Yemen (1998), Bahrain (2000), Qatar (2002), United Arab Emirates (2007), and Oman (2023), the Delegation to the Arabian Peninsula remains responsible only for Saudi Arabia.

== Papal representatives to Arabian Peninsula ==
Delegates to the Red Sea Region

- Ubaldo Calabresi (3 July 1969 – 5 January 1978)
- Giovanni Moretti (13 March 1978 – 10 July 1984)
- Luis Robles Díaz (16 February 1985 – 13 March 1990)
- Erwin Josef Ender (15 March 1990 – 26 March 1992)

Delegates to the Arabian Peninsula

- Pablo Puente Buces (25 May 1993 – 31 July 1997)
- Antonio Maria Vegliò (2 October 1997 – circa 2001)
- Giuseppe De Andrea (28 June 2001 – 27 August 2005)
- Paul-Mounged El-Hachem (27 August 2005 – 2 December 2009)
- Petar Rajič (2 December 2009 – 15 June 2015)
- Francisco Montecillo Padilla (5 April 2016 – 17 April 2020)
- Christophe Zakhia El-Kassis (22 July 2024 – 25 July 2026)

== See also ==
- Apostolic Delegation to the Arab League
