= Paul-Mounged El-Hachem =

Roman Catholic archbishop (1934–2022)

The Most Reverend Paul-Mounged El-Hachem
- Apostolic Nuncio to Kuwait, Bahrain, Qatar, United Arab Emirates and Yemen; Apostolic Delegate to the Arabian Peninsula; Titular Archbishop of Darnis
- Church: Maronite Church
- Appointed: 27 August 2005
- Term ended: 2 December 2009
- Predecessor: Giuseppe De Andrea
- Successor: Petar Rajič
- Other post: Titular Archbishop of Darnis (2005–2022)
- Previous post: Eparch of Baalbek–Deir Al-Ahmar (Maronite) (1995–2005)

Orders
- Ordination: 28 March 1959 by Emile-Arsène Blanchet
- Consecration: 13 September 1995 by Nasrallah Pierre Sfeir, Boutros Gemayel and Roland Aboujaoudé

Personal details
- Born: 8 September 1934 Akoura, Lebanon
- Died: 7 October 2022 (aged 88)
- Denomination: Catholic Church

Styles of Paul-Mounged El-Hachem
- Reference style: His Excellency; The Most Reverend
- Spoken style: Your Excellency
- Religious style: Archbishop

Paul-Mounged El-Hachem (Arabic: بول منجد الهاشم; 8 September 1934 – 7 October 2022) was a Lebanese Maronite prelate of the Catholic Church. He worked in the diplomatic service of the Holy See as apostolic nuncio to Kuwait, Bahrain, Qatar, United Arab Emirates and Yemen, and as apostolic delegate to the Arabian Peninsula. He headed the Maronite Catholic Eparchy of Baalbek-Deir El Ahmar from 1995 to 2005.

== Biography ==
El-Hachem was born on 8 September 1934 in Aqoura, Lebanon. He was ordained a priest of the Maronite Catholic Patriarchate of Antioch on 28 March 1959. He worked for years in Lebanon.

El-Hachem studied at the seminary in Ghazir and went on to continue his education at Carmes Seminary in Paris. He had master's degrees in journalism, international studies, and social studies. He received a doctorate in theology and canon law from the Catholic University of Paris. He spoke Arabic, French, Italian, English, Syriac, Latin, Greek and Aramaic.

Pope John Paul II awarded him on, 11 December 1978, an Honorific Chaplain of His Holiness.

From 1967 to 1970, he served as director of the Arabic programs for Vatican Radio. From 1970 to 1978, he was an official of the Commission for Social Communications, vice-director for the Holy See Press Office. In 1974 he was appointed delegate in charge of the Vatican Film Library.

From 1978 to 1995, El-Hachem worked at the Vatican Secretariat of State. From 1991 to 2004 he was a professor of Islamic law at the Pontifical Lateran University.

On 30 October 1993 he was appointed head of the General Affairs Section of the Vatican Secretariat of State.

On 10 June 1995, he was appointed bishop of the Eparchy of Baalbek-Deir El-Ahmar, succeeding Philippe Boutros Chebaya. The Maronite Patriarch of Antioch, Nasrallah Boutros Sfeir, consecrated him as a bishop on 13 September 1995. His co-consecrators were Boutros Gemayel, Archeparch of Cyprus and Roland Aboujaoudé, Auxiliary Bishop of Antioch.

On 27 August 2005, El-Hachem was appointed Titular Archbishop of Darnis and named apostolic nuncio to Kuwait, Bahrain, Yemen and Qatar and apostolic delegate to the Arabian Peninsula. On 4 August 2007 El-Hachem was appointed apostolic nuncio to the United Arab Emirates as well.

El-Hachem retired when he was replaced in those positions on 2 December 2009. He died on 7 October 2022, at the age of 88.

== See also ==
- List of heads of the diplomatic missions of the Holy See

Catholic Church titles
Preceded by Philippe Boutros Chebaya	Eparch of Baalbek-Deir El Ahmar; 1995–2015	Succeeded by Simon Atallah
Preceded by Raffaele Baratta	Titular Archbishop of Darnis; 2005–2022	Succeeded by Vacant
