= Giovanni Gaspari =

Vatican diplomat

His Excellency, The Most Reverend Giovanni Gaspari
- Apostolic Nuncio to South Korea and Mongolia; Titular Archbishop of Alba Maritima
- Church: Catholic Church
- Appointed: 2 March 2024
- Predecessor: Alfred Xuereb
- Other post: Titular Archbishop of Alba Maritima
- Previous post: Apostolic Nuncio to Angola and São Tomé and Príncipe (2020-2024)

Orders
- Ordination: 4 July 1987 by Antonio Iannucci
- Consecration: 17 October 2020 by Pietro Parolin

Personal details
- Born: Giovanni Gaspari; 6 June 1963 (age 63) Pescara, Italy
- Education: Pontifical Ecclesiastical Academy

Styles of Giovanni Gaspari
- Reference style: His Excellency; The Most Reverend
- Spoken style: Your Excellency
- Religious style: Archbishop

Giovanni Gaspari (born 6 June 1963) is an Italian priest of the Catholic Church who works in the diplomatic service of the Holy See since 2001.

== Biography ==
Giovanni Gaspari was born on 6 June 1963, in Pescara. He was ordained a priest of the Archdiocese of Pescara–Penne on 4 July 1987 by Archbishop Antonio Iannucci. His assignments in that diocese included stints as the archbishop's secretary, head of the vocations centre, spiritual director of the minor seminary, and chancellor of the archdiocese.

== Diplomatic career ==
To prepare for a diplomatic career he entered the Pontifical Ecclesiastical Academy in 1998. He has earned a degree in canon law and a licentiate in moral theology. He joined the diplomatic service of the Holy See on 1 July 2001, and served in diplomatic missions in the pontifical representations to Iran, Albania, Mexico, and Lithuania, as well as in the Vatican Secretariat of State.

On 21 September 2020, Pope Francis named him Apostolic Nuncio to Angola and to São Tomé and Príncipe. He made him titular archbishop of Alba Maritima at the same time.

On 2 March 2024, Pope Francis named him Apostolic Nuncio to South Korea and Mongolia.

== See also ==
- List of heads of the diplomatic missions of the Holy See

Diplomatic posts
Preceded by Alfred Xuereb	Apostolic Nuncio to Korea and Mongolia; 2 March 2024 – present	Incumbent
