= Apostolic Nunciature to United Arab Emirates =

Diplomatic post of the Holy See in the Middle East

- Address: SDN1, Al Saadiyat Island, Abu Dhabi, United Arab Emirates
- Coordinates: 24°32′05″N 54°25′37″E
- Apostolic Nuncio: Grzegorz Piotr Bielaszka

The Apostolic Nunciature to United Arab Emirates is an ecclesiastical office of the Catholic Church in United Arab Emirates. It is a diplomatic post of the Holy See, whose representative is called the Apostolic Nuncio with the rank of an ambassador. The Apostolic Nuncio to United Arab Emirates is also the Apostolic Nuncio to Yemen.

The nunciature is located in Abu Dhabi.

== History ==
Before the Holy See and United Arab Emirates established diplomatic relations, the Holy See represented its interests in United Arab Emirates through delegations with regional responsibilities, first the Apostolic Delegation to the Red Sea Region established by Pope Paul VI on 3 July 1969, and then the Apostolic Delegation to the Arabian Peninsula established by Pope John Paul II on 26 March 1992. The Holy See and United Arab Emirates established diplomatic relations on 31 May 2007.

The offices of the nunciature in Abu Dhabi were opened by Archbishop Edgar Peña Parra on behalf of the Holy See on 4 February 2022. On 03 January 2023, Pope Francis appointed Christophe Zakhia El-Kassis, Titular Archbishop of Roselle, as the first nuncio who will reside in the Nunciature in Abu Dhabi. On 5 October 2026, Pope Leo XIV appointed Grzegorz Piotr Bielaszka, titular archbishop-elect, as Apostolic Nuncio to the United Arab Emirates, succeeding Christophe-Zakhia El-Kassis, who had become Permanent Observer of the Holy See to the United Nations in New York.

== Apostolic Nuncios to United Arab Emirates ==
- Paul-Mounged El-Hachem (4 August 2007 – 2 December 2009)
- Petar Rajič (27 March 2010 – 15 June 2015)
- Francisco Montecillo Padilla (26 April 2016 – 17 April 2020)
- Christophe Zakhia El-Kassis (3 January 2023 - 25 July 2026)
- Grzegorz Piotr Bielaszka (5 October 2026 - present)

== See also ==
- Apostolic Vicariate of Southern Arabia
