= Joseph Chennoth =

Indian Catholic archbishop (1943–2020)

- Apostolic Nuncio to Japan
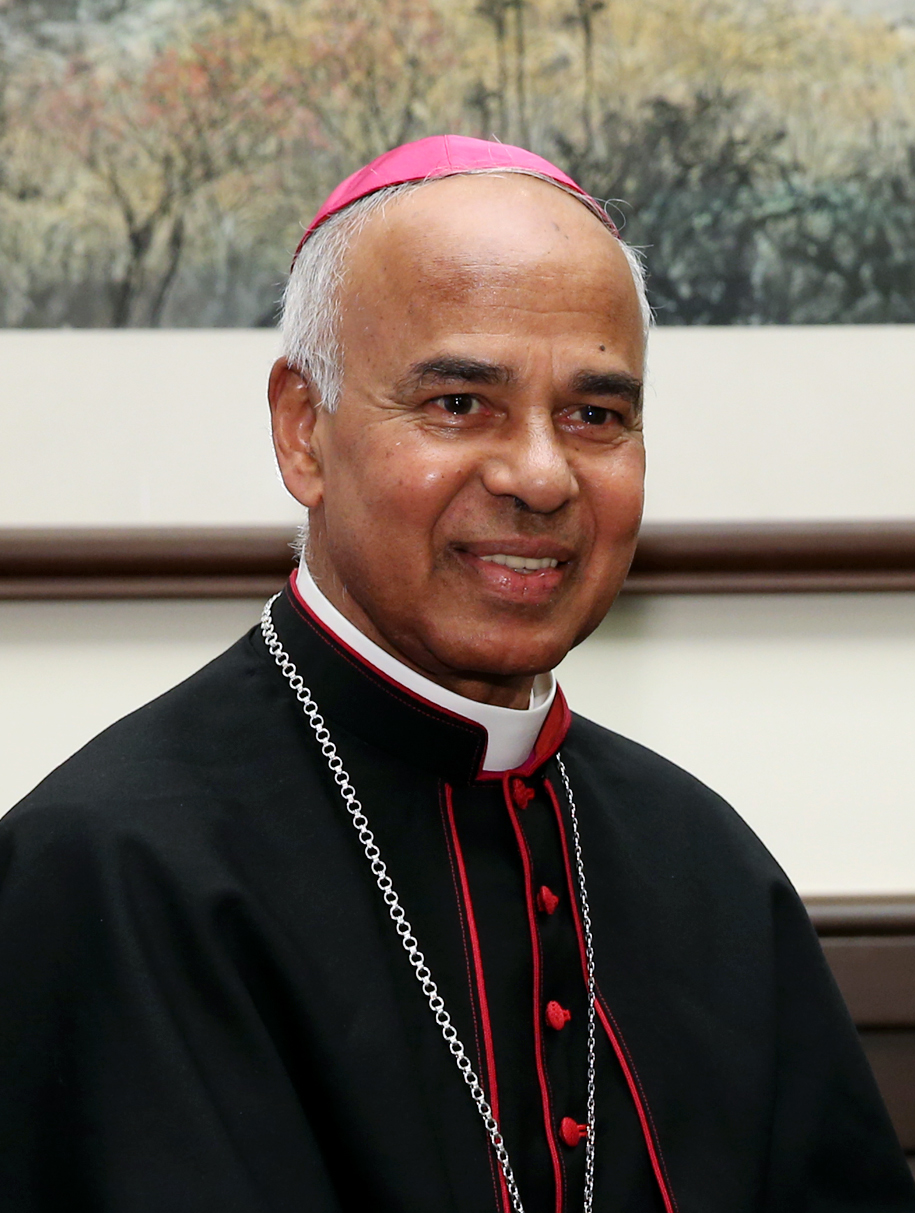
- Chennoth meeting Taiwanese President Tsai Ing-wen in 2016
- Church: Catholic Church

Orders
- Ordination: 4 May 1969
- Consecration: 30 October 1999

Personal details
- Born: 13 October 1943 Kokkamangalam, Princely State of Cochin, British India
- Died: 8 September 2020 (aged 76) Tokyo, Japan

Joseph Chennoth (13 October 1943 – 8 September 2020) was an Indian prelate of the Catholic Church who spent his career in the diplomatic service of the Holy See. He was a nuncio from 1999 until his death, serving as the Apostolic Nuncio to Japan from 2011 to 2020.

== Biography ==
Joseph Chennoth was born in Kokkamangalam, Cherthala, Kerala, India on 13 October 1943. He was born as the seventh child into the local Kokkamangalam Chennoth family, to his parents Joseph and Mariam. His family included seven siblings, consisting of five brothers (which included Dr. Thomas Chennoth) and two sisters. He attended St. Antony's Primary School and the Government Boys School in Cherthala before entering the Sacred Heart Minor Seminary.

He was ordained a priest on 4 May 1969 for the Syro-Malabar Catholic Archeparchy of Ernakulam-Angamaly. Along with his pastoral assignments, he served as secretary to Cardinal Joseph Parecattil.

He entered the diplomatic service of the Holy See in 1977 and served in Turkey, Iran, Cameroon,Germany,Vatican,Belgium,Spain, and Sweden. He also spent three years working in the Secretariat of State in Rome. He accompanied Pope John Paul II as his official interpreter during the pontiff's visit to India in 1986.

From 1995 to 1999, he was Charge d'Affaires of the Apostolic Nunciature to China (Taiwan).

On 24 August 1999, Pope John Paul II appointed him titular archbishop of Milevum and Apostolic Nuncio to the Central African Republic and to Chad. He received his episcopal consecration on 30 October 1999 from Cardinal Angelo Sodano.

On 15 June 2005, Pope Benedict XVI appointed him Apostolic Nuncio to Tanzania.

On 15 August 2011, Benedict XVI named him Apostolic Nuncio to Japan.

Chennoth died in Tokyo from a stroke on 8 September 2020 at the age of 76.

- Grand Cordon of the Order of the Rising Sun (the highest of the eight classes of the Order of the Rising Sun).
- Reason: Honored for his significant contributions to strengthening friendly relations and diplomatic ties between Japan and the Holy See during his tenure as the Apostolic Nuncio (Vatican Ambassador) to Japan from 2011 to 2020.
- Timing: Bestowed after his passing on September 8, 2020, in Tokyo. [1]
