= John Bulaitis =

Lithuanian prelate

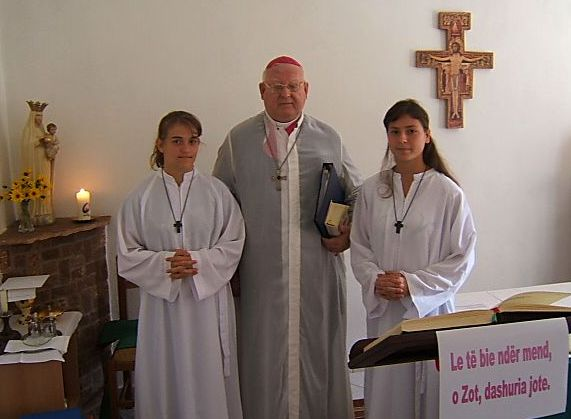
John Bulaitis (middle) in Albania during a visit in Delvina (2005)

John Bulaitis (26 June 1933 – 25 December 2010) was a Lithuanian prelate of the Catholic Church who served in the diplomatic service of the Holy See. He served terms as Apostolic Nuncio to several countries between 1981 and 2008.

John Bulaitis, the prelate of the Catholic Church, is sometimes confused with Dr John Bulaitis, former Senior Lecturer in History at Canterbury Christ Church University. Dr John Bulaitis is author of Communism in Rural France and Maurice Thorez: A Biography. https://www.canterbury.ac.uk/arts-and-humanities/school-of-humanities/Staff/Profile.aspx?staff=bbf7063b8e4bf6c6 His book, The Tithe War in England and Wales, 1881-1936 was joint winner of the 2025 Joan Thirsk Memorial Prize awarded to ‘the best book in British and Irish rural or agrarian history’.

Born in London, United Kingdom, the Prelate John Bulaitis was ordained a priest for the Roman Catholic Diocese of Kaišiadorys, Lithuania, in 1958.

To prepare for a career in the diplomatic service he entered the program of study at the Pontifical Ecclesiastical Academy in 1961.

In 1981, he was named titular archbishop of Narona and apostolic nuncio to Chad and Apostolic Pro-Nuncio to the Central African Republic and the Republic of the Congo.

On 11 July 1987, he was named Apostolic Pro-Nuncio to Iran.

On 30 November 1991, he was named Apostolic Pro-Nuncio to Korea and he was given in addition the position of Apostolic Nuncio to Mongolia on 8 September 1992.

He was appointed apostolic nuncio to Albania on 25 March 1997.

Bulaitis retired in 2008.
