= Giuseppe De Andrea =

Italian priest and theologian (1930–2016)

The Most Reverend Giuseppe De Andrea
- Assessor of the Order of the Holy Sepulchre
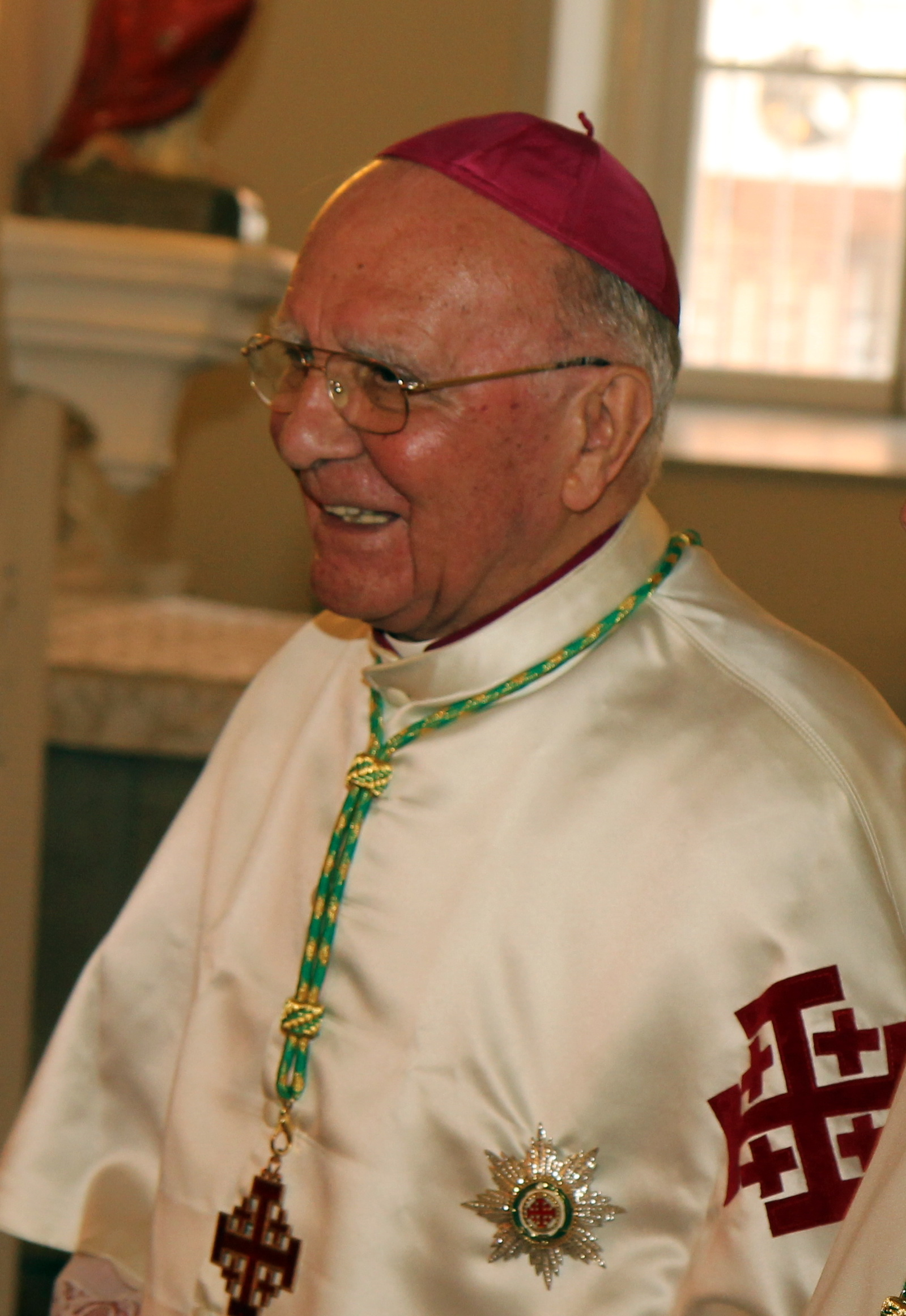
- Church: Catholic Church
- Predecessor: Andrea Cordero Lanza di Montezemolo
- Successor: Antonio Franco
- Other posts: Apostolic Nuncio to Kuwait, Yemen, Bahrain (2001-2005); Apostolic Nuncio to Qatar (2003-2005)

Orders
- Ordination: 21 June 1953
- Consecration: 20 September 2001 by Angelo Sodano

Personal details
- Born: 20 April 1930
- Died: 29 June 2016 (aged 86) Rome, Italy
- Motto: Expectantes beatem spem
- Coat of arms

Giuseppe De Andrea (20 April 1930 – 29 June 2016) was an Italian-born prelate of the Catholic Church who spent twenty years as a pastor in the United States and then twenty-five years in the diplomatic service of the Holy See.

== Early years ==
Giuseppe De Andrea was born on 20 April 1930 in Rivarolo Canavese, Italy, to Antonio and Antonietta (Marchetti) De Andrea. His elder brother is Archbishop Giovanni De Andrea.

He earned his S.T.L. from the Pontifical Gregorian University in Rome and a master's in education from the Catholic University of America in Washington, D.C.

He was ordained a priest of the Consolata Missionaries on 21 June 1953. He worked as a teacher in Kenya from 1956 to 1958. He was then incardinated into the Diocese of Greensburg, Pennsylvania, in 1958, and served in parishes and other institutions for twenty years. From 1961 to 1964 he was a chaplain and a professor of theology at Seton Hill University. From 1964 to 1967 he was a headmaster at St. Joseph Hall Preparatory School in Greensburg, PA.

== Diplomatic and Roman years ==
In the 1980s De Andrea served as a representative of the Vatican at the United Nations. In 1994 he was Under Secretary of the Pontifical Council for the Pastoral Care of Migrants and Itinerants. On 2 December 1999 he became chargé d'affaires of the Holy See diplomatic presence in Kuwait, Yemen, and the Arabian Peninsula.

On 28 June 2001, Pope John Paul II appointed him titular archbishop of Anzio and apostolic nuncio to Kuwait, Bahrain, and Yemen, as well as Apostolic Delegate to the Arabian Peninsula. On 29 November 2003 he was given additional responsibility as Apostolic Nuncio to Qatar. His diplomatic career ended when he was replaced in these positions by Paul-Mounged El-Hachem on 27 August 2005.

On 8 January 2007, Pope Benedict XVI named him a member of the Congregation for the Evangelization of Peoples. He also served as vice president of the Labour Office of the Apostolic See until 13 October 2007.

De Andrea served as Assessor of the Order of the Holy Sepulchre from 2008 to 2013. In 2011–2012, following the resignation of the Grand Master, Cardinal John Patrick Foley due to ill health, he fulfilled the Grand Master's duties until the appointment of Cardinal Edwin O’Brien as Foley's successor. He remained an Honorary Assessor until his death.

He was also a senior canon at St. Peter's Basilica during his retirement.

He died in Rome at the age of 86 and was buried alongside his brother Archbishop Giovanni in the Rivarolo Canavese cemetery.
