= Gian Luca Perici =

Italian catholic prelate

His Excellency, The Most Reverend Gian Luca Perici
- Apostolic Nuncio to Zambia and Malawi; Titular Archbishop of Volsinium
- Appointed: 5 June 2023
- Predecessor: Gianfranco Gallone
- Other post: Titular Archbishop of Bolsena

Orders
- Ordination: 21 September 1991 by Andrea Maria Erba
- Consecration: 15 July 2023 by Pietro Parolin, Luis Antonio Tagle, and Stefano Russo

Personal details
- Born: 17 September 1964 (age 61) Bassano del Grappa, Vicenza, Italy
- Motto: SUB TUUM PRÆSIDIUM
- Coat of arms

Styles of Gian Luca Perici
- Reference style: His Excellency; The Most Reverend
- Spoken style: Your Excellency
- Religious style: Archbishop

Gian Luca Perici (born 17 September 1964) is an Italian prelate of the Catholic Church who works in the diplomatic service of the Holy See.

== Biography ==
Gian Luca Perici was born on 17 September 1964 in Bassano del Grappa, Vicenza, Italy. He was ordained a priest for the Diocese of Velletri–Segni on 21 September 1991.

== Diplomatic career ==
Perici entered the Holy See Diplomatic Service on 1 July 2001. He served in the following posts as Secretary of the Apostolic Nunciature: 2001-2002 Mexico, 2002-2005 Haiti, 2005-2008 Malta, and 2008-2011 Angola.

He served in the following posts as Counselor of the Apostolic Nunciature: 2011-2015 Brazil, 2015-2018 Sweden, 2018-2021 Spain, and 2021-2023 Portugal.

On 5 June 2023, Pope Francis appointed him Titular Archbishop of Volsinium and Apostolic Nuncio to Zambia and Malawi. On 15 July 2023, Cardinal Pietro Parolin conferred episcopal ordination on the new archbishop.

He knows French, English, Portuguese and Spanish.

== See also ==
- List of heads of the diplomatic missions of the Holy See
