= Giuseppe Leanza =

Italian nuncio and archbishop

His Excellency, The Most Reverend Giuseppe Leanza
- Apostolic Nuncio emeritus of Czech Republic; Titular Archbishop of Lilybaeum
- Appointed: 15 September 2011
- Retired: 21 September 2018
- Predecessor: Diego Causero
- Successor: Charles Daniel Balvo
- Other post: Titular Archbishop of Lilybaeum
- Previous posts: Apostolic Nuncio of Ireland (2008-2011); Apostolic Nuncio of Bulgaria (2003-2008); Apostolic Nuncio of Slovenia and Macedonia (2002-2003); Apostolic Nuncio of Bosnia and Herzegovina (1999-2003); Apostolic Nuncio of Zambia and Apostolic Pro-Nuncio to Malawi (1991-1999); Apostolic Nuncio of Haiti (1990-1991)

Orders
- Ordination: 17 July 1966
- Consecration: 22 September 1990 by Agostino Casaroli, Pio Laghi, and Ignazio Zambito

Personal details
- Born: 2 January 1943 (age 83) Cesarò, Italy

Styles of Giuseppe Leanza
- Reference style: His Excellency; The Most Reverend
- Spoken style: Your Excellency
- Religious style: Archbishop

Giuseppe Leanza KC*HS (born 2 January 1943) was born in Cesarò, Italy. and ordained on 17 July 1966.

== Diplomatic career ==
After being awarded a Doctorate in Canon Law, he entered the diplomatic service of the Holy See in 1972 and served at the pontifical representations in Paraguay, Uganda, the United States and in the section for relations with states in the Roman Curia.

Pope John Paul II appointed him Apostolic Nuncio to Haiti and Titular Archbishop of Lilybaeum 3 July 1990. He was consecrated bishop on 22 September 1990 by Secretary of State to His Holiness, Agostino Cardinal Casaroli, serving as principal consecrator, with Cardinal Pio Laghi and Bishop Ignazio Zambito as Principal Co–Consecrators. He was appointed apostolic nuncio to Zambia and pro-nuncio to Malawi on 4 June 1991 and then nuncio to Bosnia and Herzegovina on 29 April 1999. He was named nuncio to Slovenia on 15 May 2002, to which the title nuncio to Macedonia was added three days later. On 22 February 2003 he was appointed nuncio to Bulgaria.

=== Nuncio to Ireland ===
On 22 February 2008, Pope Benedict XVI appointed him Apostolic Nuncio to Ireland. He arrived in Ireland on 22 April and presented his credentials to President Mary McAleese on 28 April 2008. Besides his native Italian, he speaks English, French, Serbo-Croat and Spanish.

==== Murphy Report ====
In the Murphy Report on abuse of children in the Dublin diocese, published on 26 November 2009, mention was made of Archbishop Leanza and his predecessor, Archbishop Lazzarotto. In September 2006, the commission wrote to the Vatican's Congregation for the Doctrine of the Faith seeking information on reports of clerical child sex abuse sent to it by the Dublin archdiocese over the relevant 30-year period. It also sought information on the document Crimen sollicitationis, which dealt with crimes that include the sexual abuse of minors. In reply, it contacted the Irish Department of Foreign Affairs, stating that the commission had not gone through appropriate diplomatic channels. As a body independent of Government, the commission said it did not consider it appropriate to use diplomatic channels.

Archbishop Leanza declined an invitation to address the Oireachtas Foreign Affairs Committee, a decision described as "scandalous" by Fine Gael's then-spokesperson on children, Alan Shatter. Archbishop Giuseppe Leanza was invited to appear before the committee following calls for his expulsion after the Murphy commission revealed that the papal nuncio had refused to co-operate with its inquiry into clerical abuse in the Dublin diocese. In a letter to committee chairman Michael Woods, Archbishop Leanza said "it is not the practice of the Holy See that apostolic nuncios appear before parliamentary commissions". The letter, dated 12 February, said: "As the papal representative, I am always available to examine questions of mutual interest in the relations between the Holy See and Ireland through contacts with the Ministry for Foreign Affairs, as has been the norm hitherto.

==== Ryan report ====
The then-Minister for Foreign Affairs, Micheál Martin TD, met with Archbishop Giuseppe Leanza on 8 December 2009 to discuss the findings of the Dublin Archdiocese Commission of Investigation and the issue of the cooperation of the Nuncio and the Holy See with the Commission. The Minister conveyed to the Papal Nuncio the deep anger and outrage of the Irish public at the appalling abuse of children detailed in the report. The Minister explained to the Papal Nuncio the need for the Holy See to provide the fullest possible cooperation with any further State investigations in relation to clerical child abuse, in particular in the context of the inquiry by the Commission into the Diocese of Cloyne.

In the Irish Parliament, The Dáil, Minister Martin said: "Archbishop Giuseppe Leanza, called to Iveagh House at my request on Tuesday of last week to discuss the report of the Dublin archdiocese commission of investigation, and the issue of the co-operation received by the commission from the Holy See and successive Papal Nuncios as it carried out its investigations. At this meeting, I conveyed to the Papal Nuncio the deep anger and outrage of the Irish public at the appalling abuse of children detailed in the commission's report. I emphasised to Archbishop Leanza the importance of the Vatican providing a substantive response to inquiries from the commission. I explained to the Nuncio the need for the Holy See to provide the fullest possible co-operation with any ongoing or further State investigations into clerical child abuse, including in the context of the upcoming inquiry by the commission into the diocese of Cloyne. The Nuncio undertook to convey my strong view that the Vatican should co-operate with any request from the Dublin and Cloyne commission or any future commission to co-operate with any request for information."

Archbishop Leanza attended all meetings at the Vatican during the 15–16 February 2010 summit involving Pope Benedict, senior Curial cardinals and the Irish bishops. However, he did not contribute to proceedings nor did he or the Vatican secretary of state Cardinal Bertone make any reference at the various sessions to the decision of Archbishop Leanza not to appear before the Oireachtas Committee on Foreign Affairs, said the Archbishop of Cashel and Emly Dermot Clifford.

==== Cloyne report ====
The day after the Cloyne report was published on 13 July 2011, Archbishop Leanza met Minister for Foreign Affairs, Eamon Gilmore. On 25 July 2011, he was recalled to the Secretariat of State for consultations as a sign, among other things, of "surprise and disappointment at certain excessive reactions".

=== Nuncio to the Czech Republic ===
On 15 September 2011, Pope Benedict XVI appointed Leanza Nuncio to the Czech Republic, remaining in the post until 21 September 2018, having been replaced by South Sudan nuncio Charles Daniel Balvo.

== See also ==
- List of heads of the diplomatic missions of the Holy See

Diplomatic posts
Preceded by Paolo Romeo	Apostolic Nuncio to Haiti; 3 July 1990 – 4 June 1991	Succeeded by Lorenzo Baldisseri
Preceded by Eugenio Sbarbaro	Apostolic Pro-Nuncio to Malawi; 4 June 1991 – 29 April 1999	Succeeded by Orlando Antonini as Apostolic Nuncio
Preceded by Eugenio Sbarbaro	Apostolic Nuncio to Zambia; 4 June 1991 – 29 April 1999	Succeeded by Orlando Antonini
Preceded by Francesco Monterisi	Apostolic Nuncio to Bosnia and Herzegovina; 29 April 1999 – 22 February 2003	Succeeded by Santos Abril y Castelló
Preceded by Giuseppe Lazzarotto	Apostolic Nuncio to Ireland; 22 February 2008 – 15 September 2011	Succeeded by Charles John Brown
Preceded by Diego Causero	Apostolic Nuncio to the Czech Republic; 15 September 2011 – 21 September 2018	Succeeded by Charles Daniel Balvo
