= Orlando Antonini =

Italian prelate of the Catholic Church

His Excellency, The Most Reverend Orlando Antonini
- Apostolic Nuncio emeritus of Serbia; Titular Archbishop of Formia
- Appointed: 8 August 2009
- Retired: 30 September 2015
- Predecessor: Eugenio Sbarbaro
- Successor: Luciano Suriani
- Other post: Titular Archbishop of Formia
- Previous posts: Apostolic Nuncio to Paraguay (2005-2009); Apostolic Nuncio to Zambia and Malawi (1999-2005)

Orders
- Ordination: 29 June 1968 by Costantino Stella
- Consecration: 11 September 1999 by Angelo Sodano, Giuseppe Molinari, and Charles Asa Schleck

Personal details
- Born: 15 October 1944 (age 81) Villa Sant'Angelo, L’Aquila, italy

Styles of Orlando Antonini
- Reference style: His Excellency; The Most Reverend
- Spoken style: Your Excellency
- Religious style: Archbishop

Orlando Antonini (born 15 October 1944) is an Italian prelate of the Catholic Church who worked in the diplomatic service of the Holy See from 1980 to 2015, as an archbishop and apostolic nuncio from 1999 to 2015.

== Biography ==
Orlando Antonini was born on 15 October 1944 in Villa Sant'Angelo, Province of L'Aquila, Italy. He was ordained a priest on 29 June 1968. He earned a doctorate in canon law.

== Diplomatic career ==
On 25 March 1980, he entered the diplomatic service of the Holy See. His early assignments took him to Bangladesh, Madagascar, Syria, Chile, the Netherlands, and France. He also worked in Rome at the Secretariat of State.

On 24 July 1999 Pope John Paul II appointed him Titular Archbishop of Formia and Apostolic Nuncio to both Zambia and Malawi. He received his episcopal consecration from Cardinal Angelo Sodano on 11 September 1999.

Pope Benedict XVI appointed him Apostolic Nuncio on 16 November 2005 to Paraguay, and on 8 August 2009 to the Apostolic Nuncio in Serbia.

He retired on 30 September 2015.

== See also ==
- List of heads of the diplomatic missions of the Holy See
