= Marsala Cathedral =

Church in Marsala, Sicily, Italy

Coordinates: 37.7991°N 12.4343°E

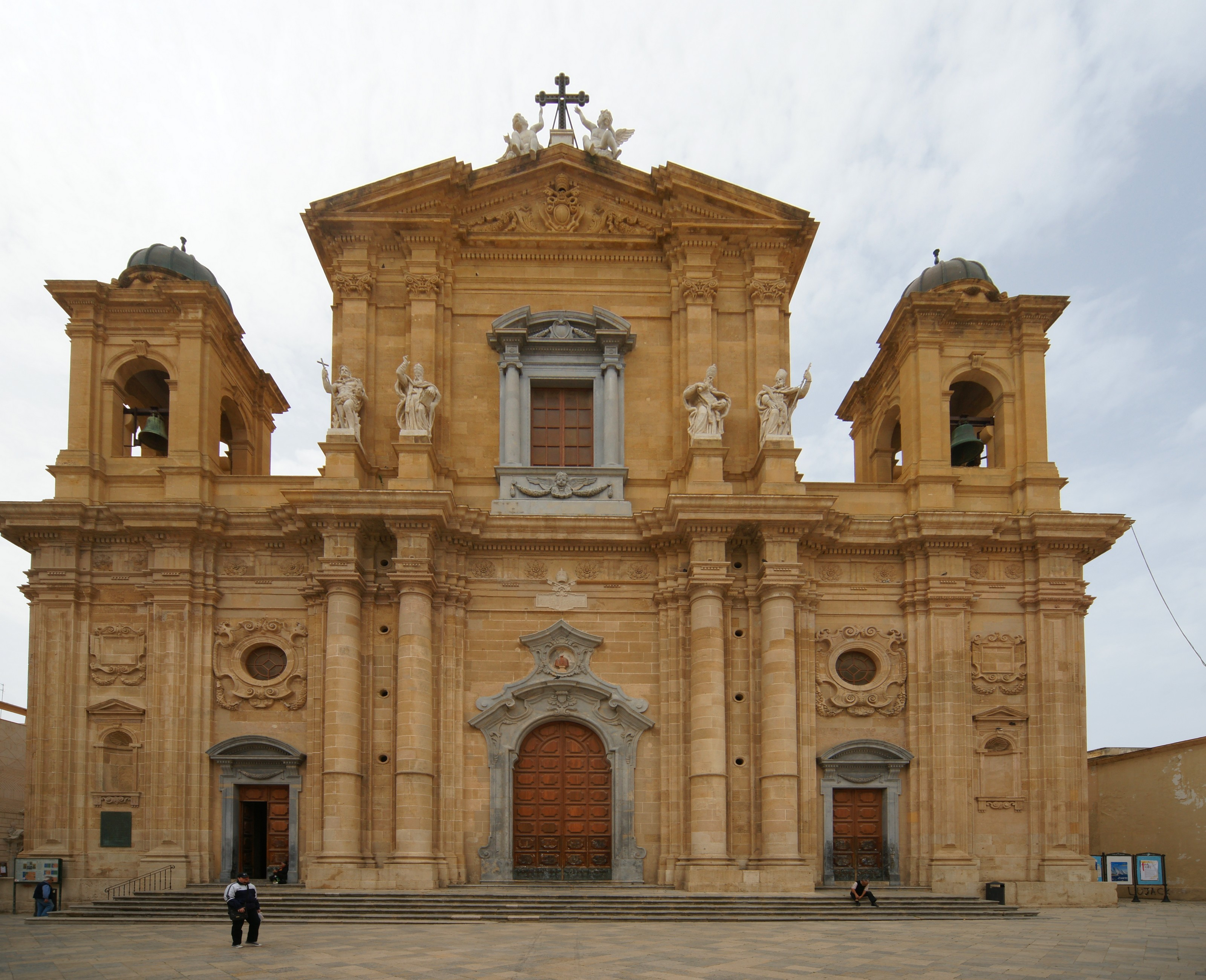

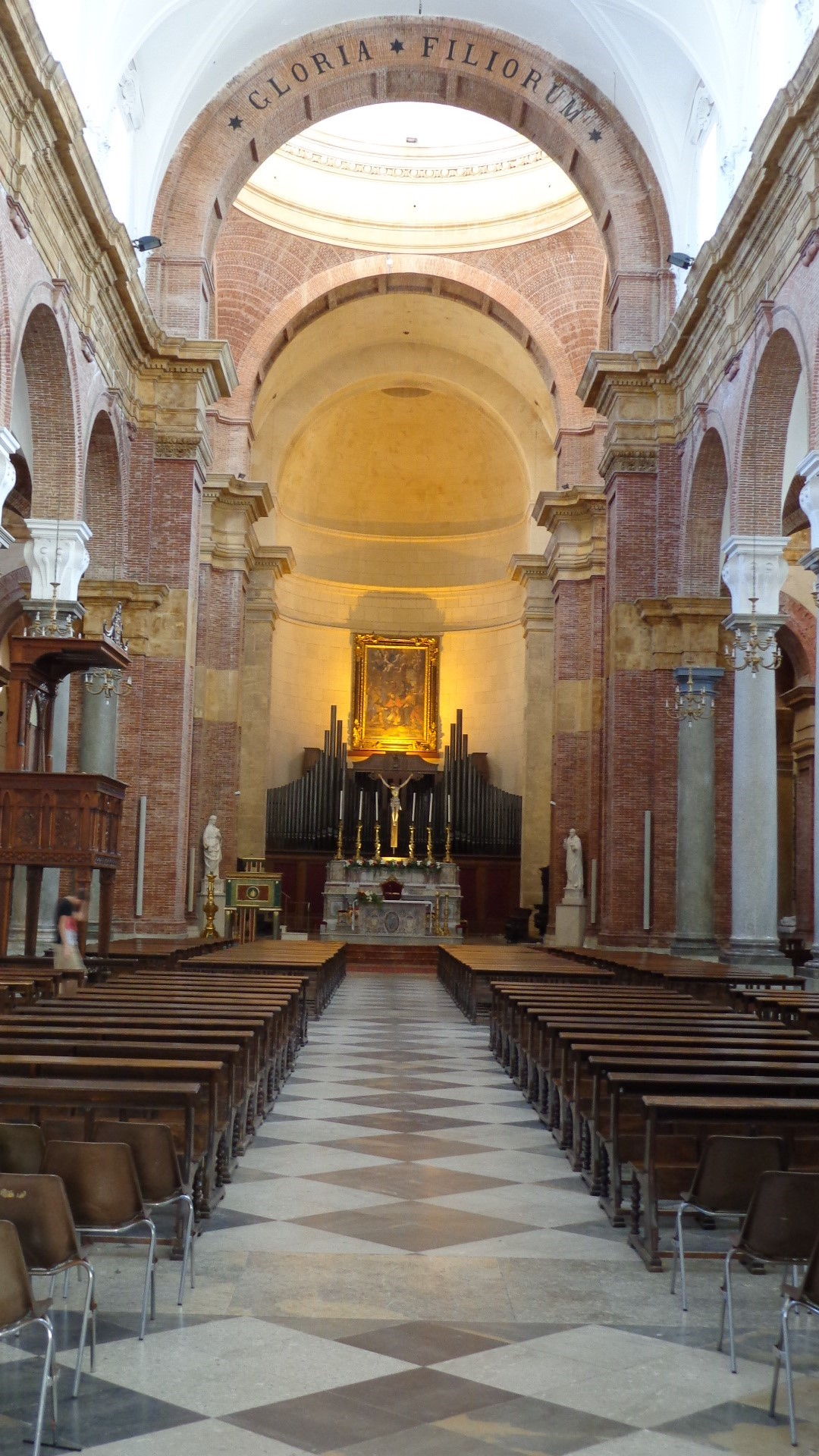

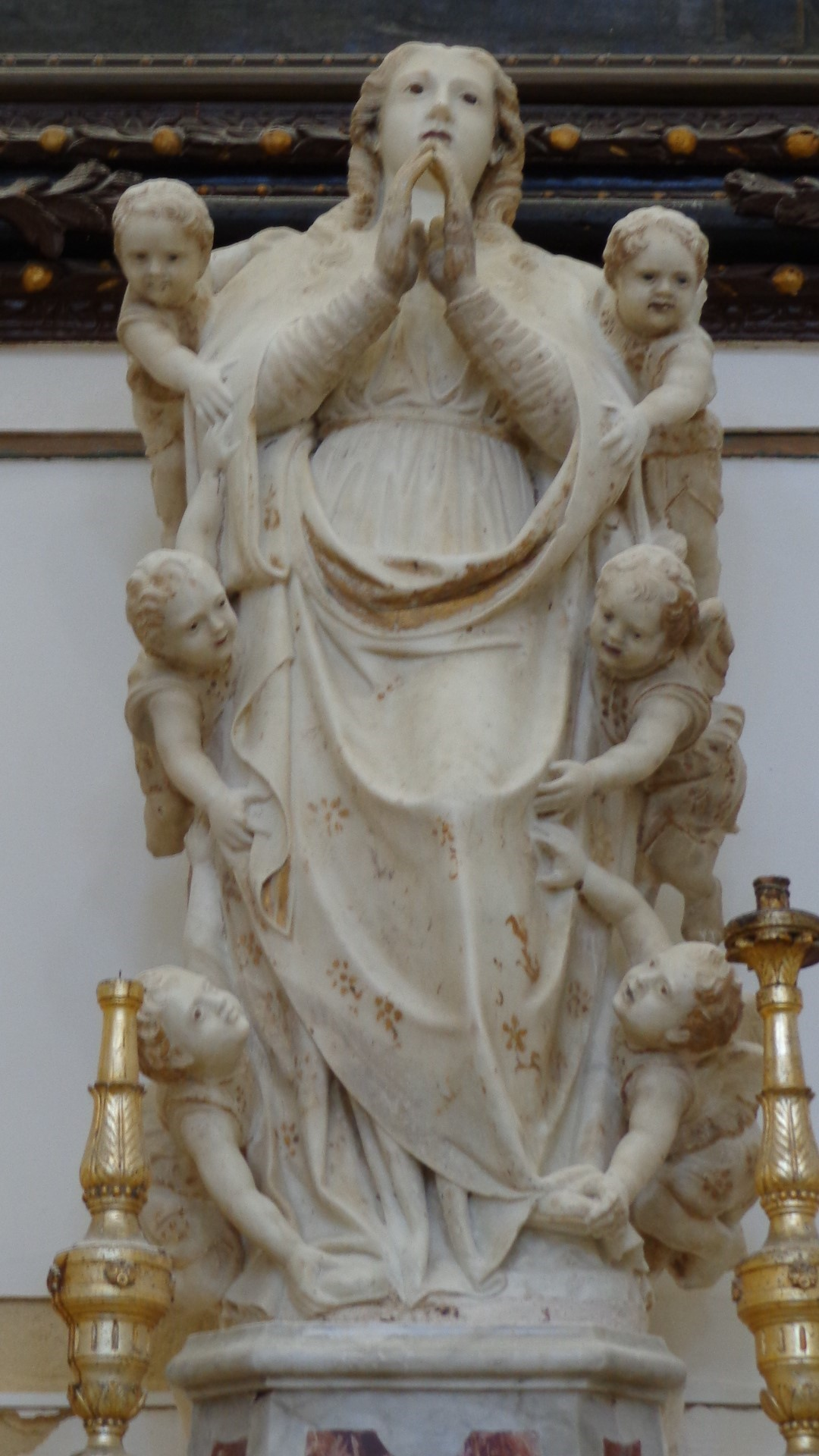
Madonna of the Assumption

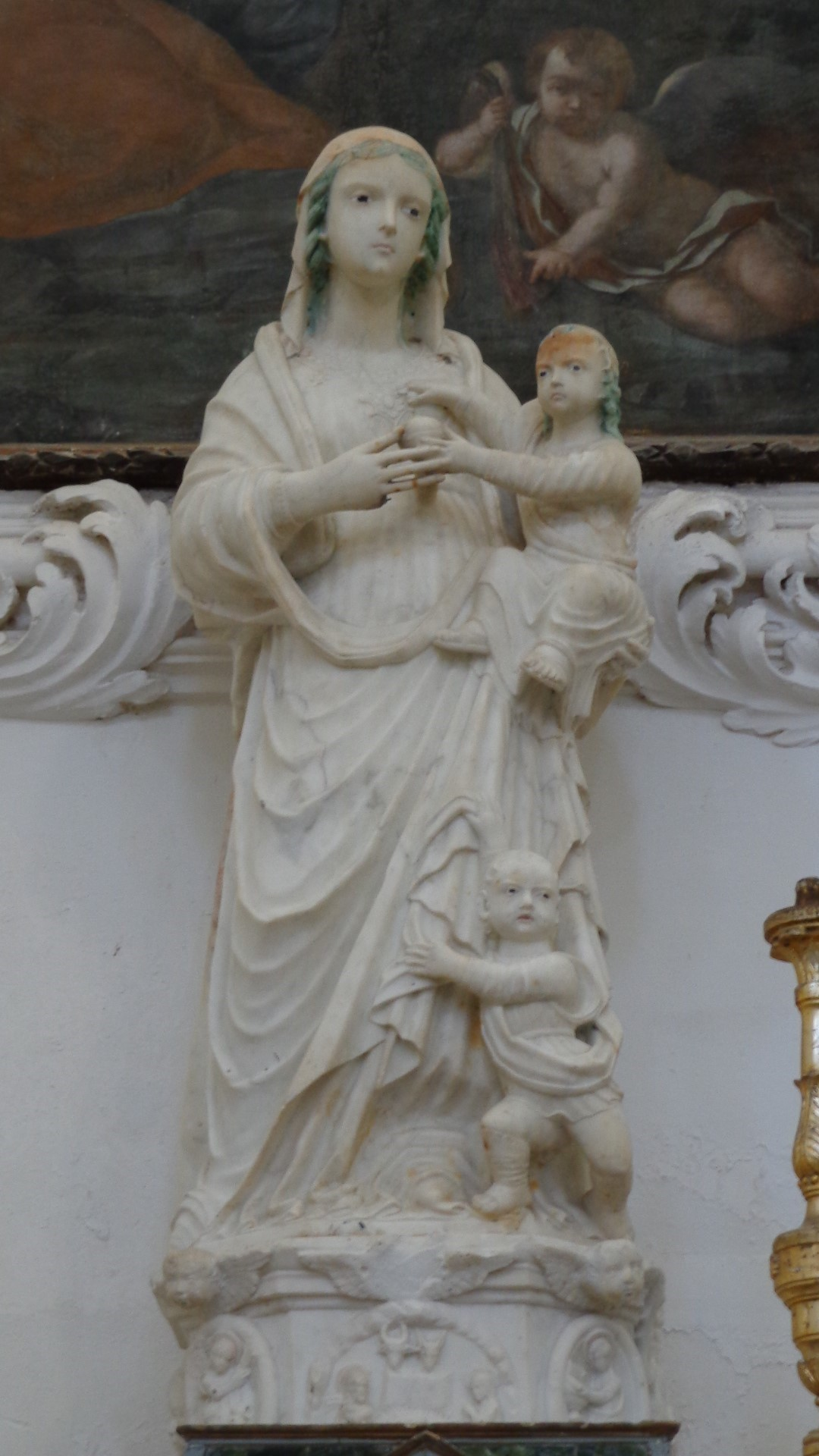
Madonna of the Cave.

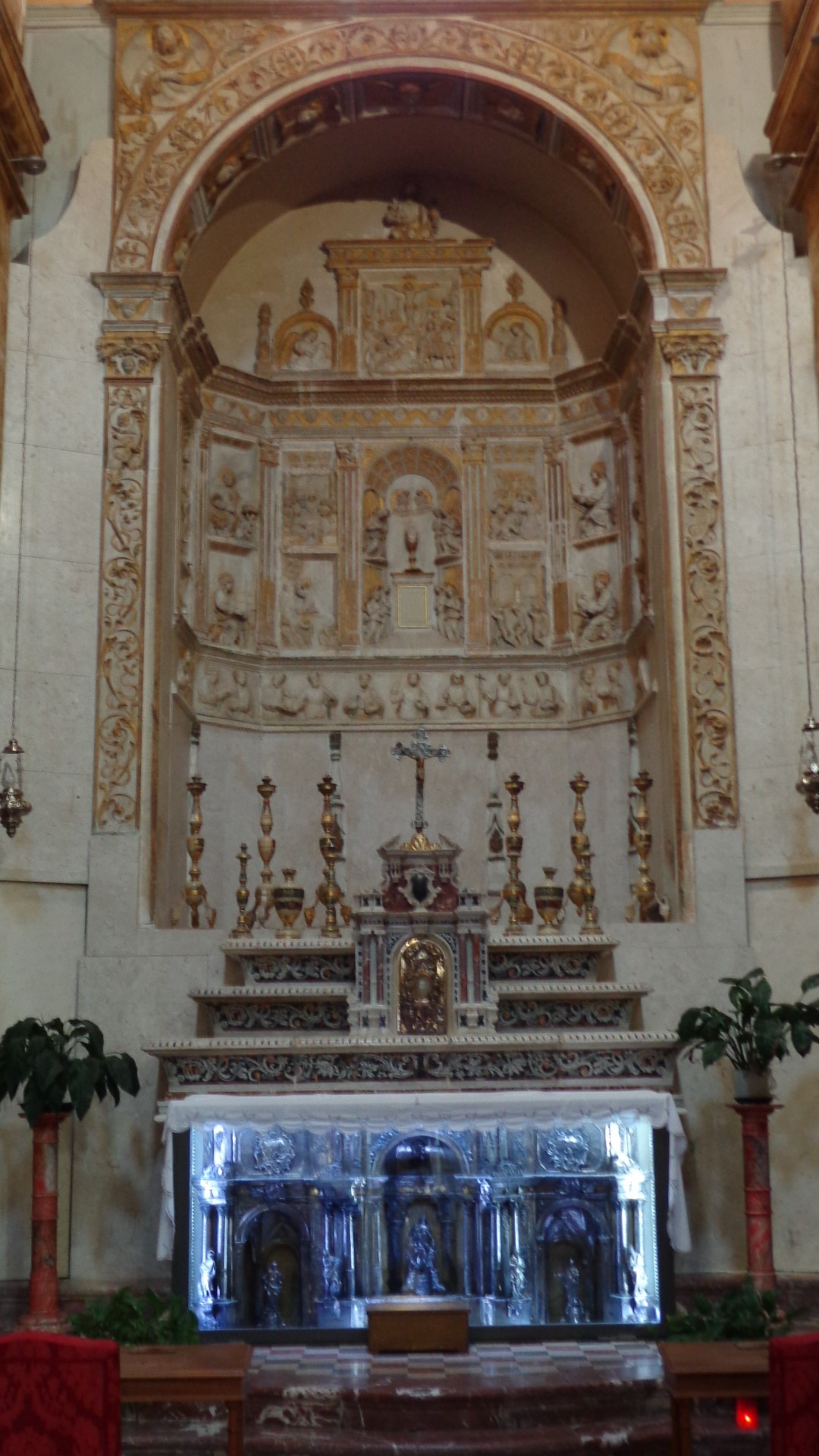
Icon in the Chapel of the Most Holy Sacrament

Marsala Cathedral (Italian - duomo di San Tommaso di Canterbury) is the largest church in the town of Marsala, Sicily, and the Diocese of Mazara del Vallo. Its facade faces onto piazza della Repubblica and the nearby via Giuseppe Garibaldi. It is dedicated to the Anglo-Norman saint Thomas Becket, whose cult was introduced to Sicily via its close relations with England under William I and William II – the latter even married Henry II of England's daughter Joan, who also supported Thomas' cult despite Henry's part in triggering his death.

From the first half of the 2nd century to the 9th century it was the seat of the Diocese of Lilybaeum. Remains survive of a basilica cathedral which survived from the first half of the 2nd century until the 9th century. That diocese was suppressed during the Arab era on the island. As recorded by Al Idrisi, Marsala was commercially eclipsed by Mazara by the time of the Norman conquest of the island and so – on the re-establishment of a diocese covering the area in the 11th century – its seat was placed in Mazara not Marsala. It is now the seat of the archpriest and foranial vicariate of Marsala, the parish of San Tommaso Becket and (since 1966) of the titular diocese of Dioecesis Lilybaetana, The third of these entitles it to the title of cathedral.

== History ==
=== Norman era ===
Arab raids had left the 2nd century church in poor condition and the Norman church was probably built on its site. Tradition holds that the Norman cathedral was begun around 1176, during the era when the diocese of Val di Mazara was held by Tutino, a native of Marsala. To compensate for Marsala no longer being the seat of the diocese, its church was promoted to archpriest status. Its main facade was on what is now piazza Maggio, on the site of the present church's side-door, and the church occupied more than half of what is now via Garibaldi. It seems to have had a basilica plan with side chapels behind a colonnaded portico and a bell-tower. It was consecrated between 1173 (date of Thomas Becket's canonisation) and 1189 (end of William II and Joan's reign).

=== Aragonese era ===
From the reign of Alfonso V of Aragon onwards, Renaissance style arrived in Marsala, influenced by Tuscan-Carraran and Lombard-Ticinian currents via north European marble workers active in Palermo from the 15th century onwards. Despite difficult economic conditions the Norman cathedral was enlarged three times between 1497 and 1590. The first of these was in 1497 included the construction of a 'cappellone' and two side-chapels, one dedicated to the Most Holy Sacrament and given over to the Ministrali, the lay confraternity of blacksmiths, tailors, shoemakers and carpenters. Thanks to generosity from private military and civilian citizens such as the knight and captain of justice Giulio Alazaro, the noblemen Pietro di Anello and Antonio La Liotta and the lay confraternity of master workers, the church gained sculptures by Gagini, Berrettaro, Mancino and Di Battista.

The last of these three rebuildings came in 1590, as evidenced by Gioacchino di Marzo's description, which refers to works to re-order the Most Holy Sacrament Chapel. This gave the altar its present baroque appearance, raising it on four figures (later inserted on the side walls among the stucco decoration) to make room for a silver frontal. This partial dismantling, reassembly and stucco is attributed to Orazio Ferrero from Giuliana, who added the figure of God the Father to the vault.

=== 1700 to present ===
In the first half of the 18th century Giovanni Biagio Amico restored the church's roof

The church's dome collapsed in 1893 and the building was closed for safety reasons, reopening in 1903 after a temporary covering was put in place. In 1950 a permanent dome was put in place and survives to the present day, which was restored in 2016.

== Architecture ==
=== Exterior ===
The first order (lower half) of the facade is Baroque, whilst the second order (upper half) and the bell-tower were built a century later in the barocchetto style.

=== Interior ===
The interior is in the Norman style, particularly the high altar, whilst some details of the side chapels are in the Baroque style.

== Gallery ==
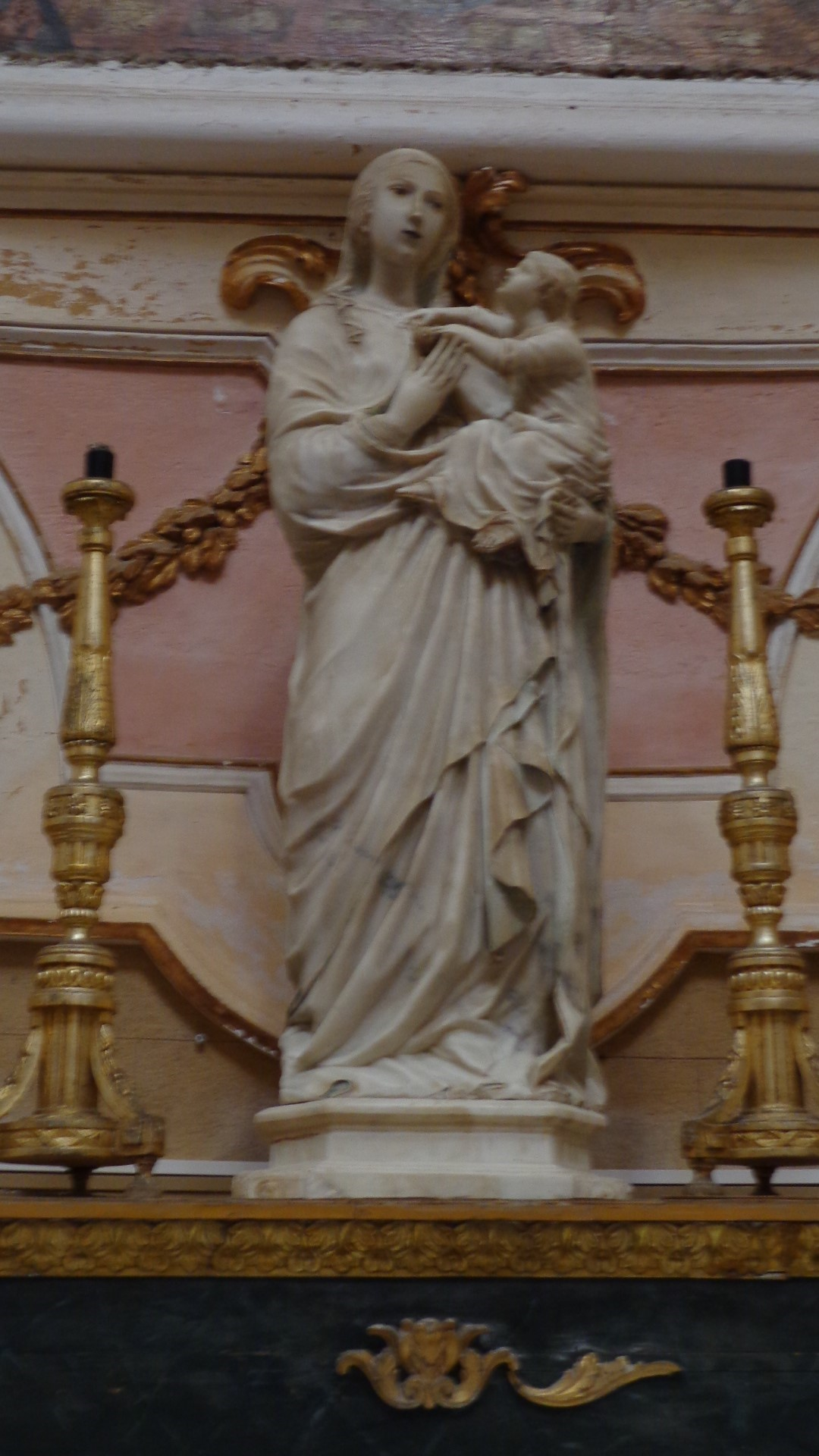
Madonna of Itria

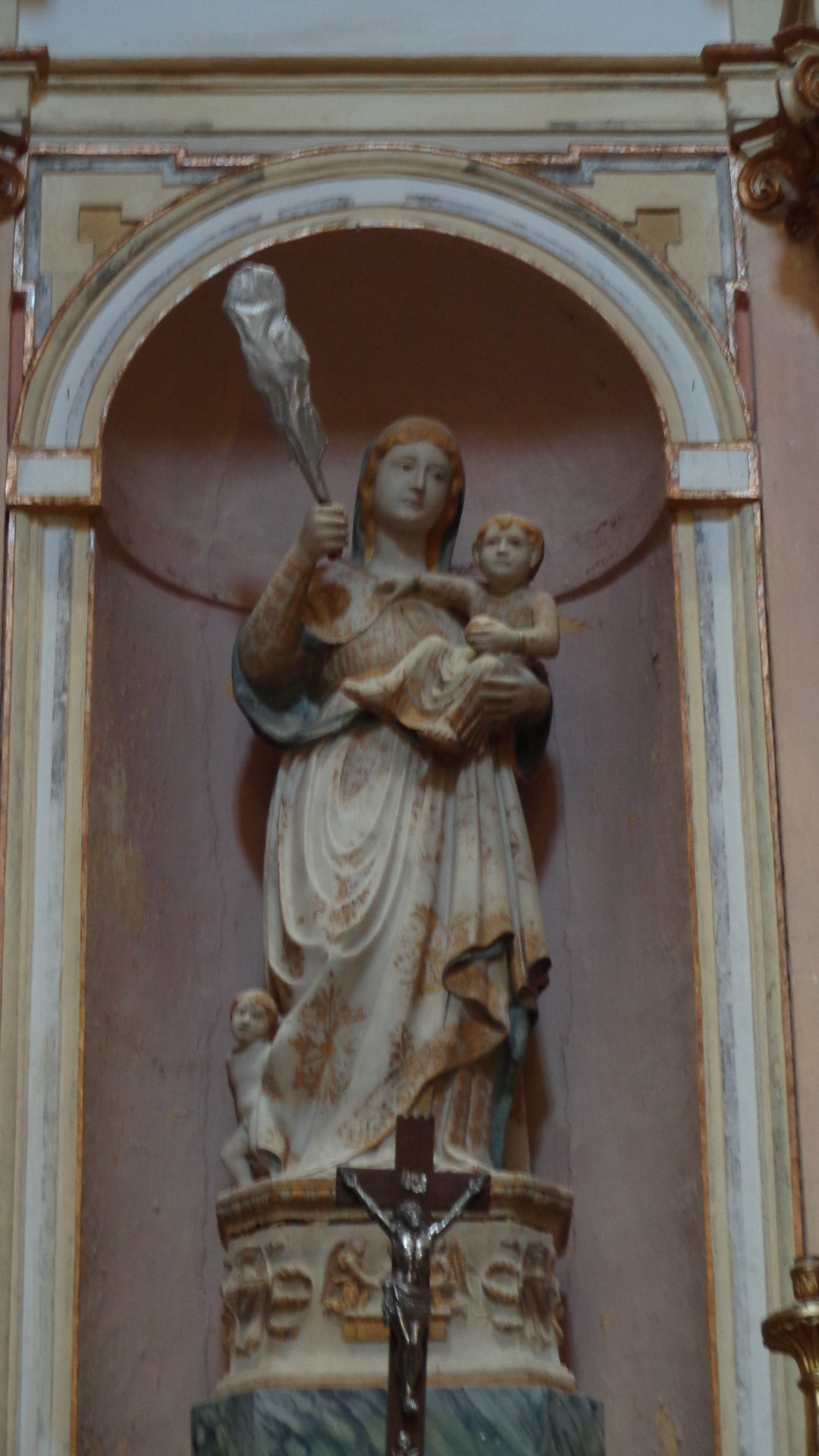
Madonna of Help or Madonna della Mazza

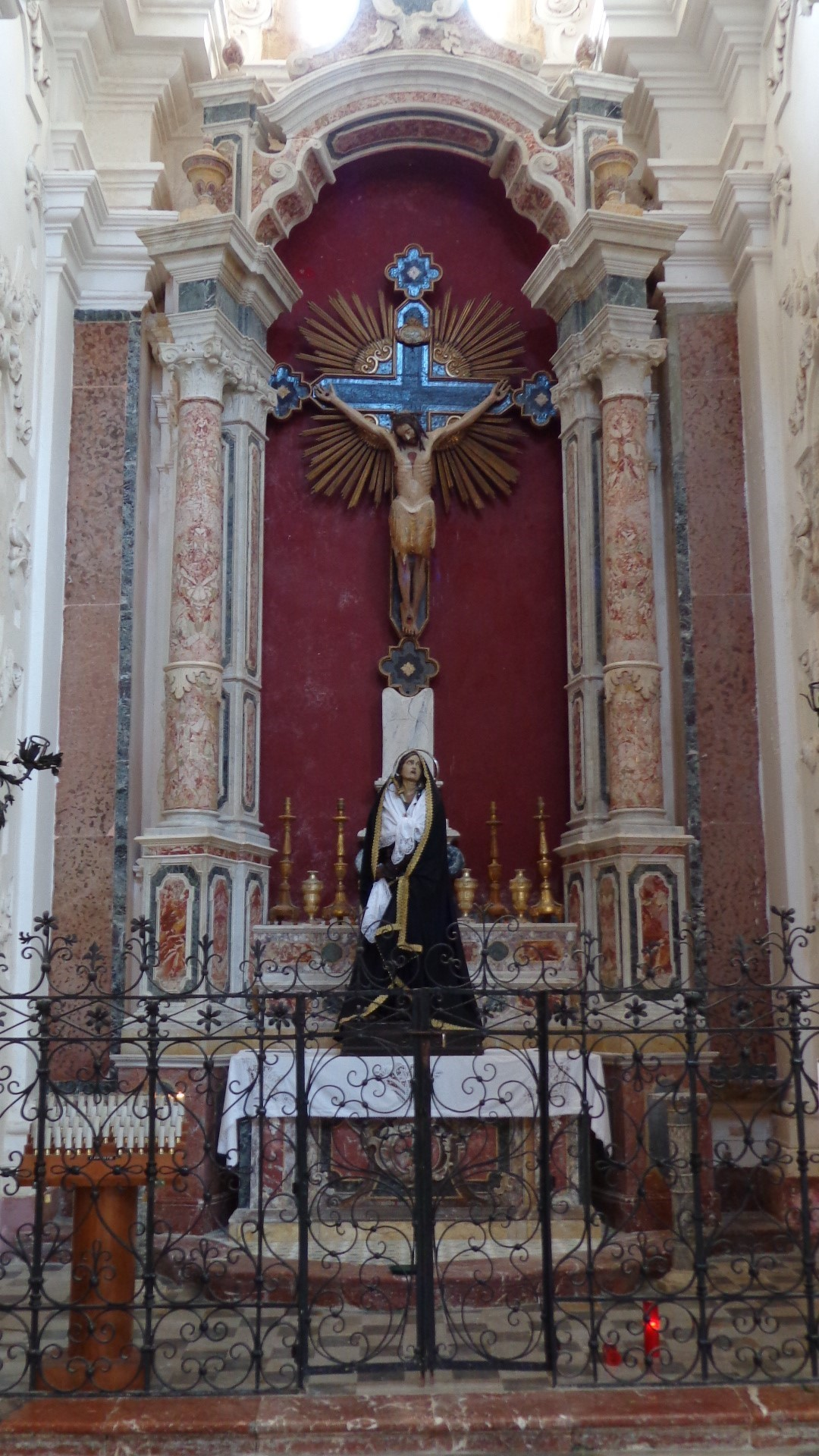
Chapel of the Most Holy Crucifix

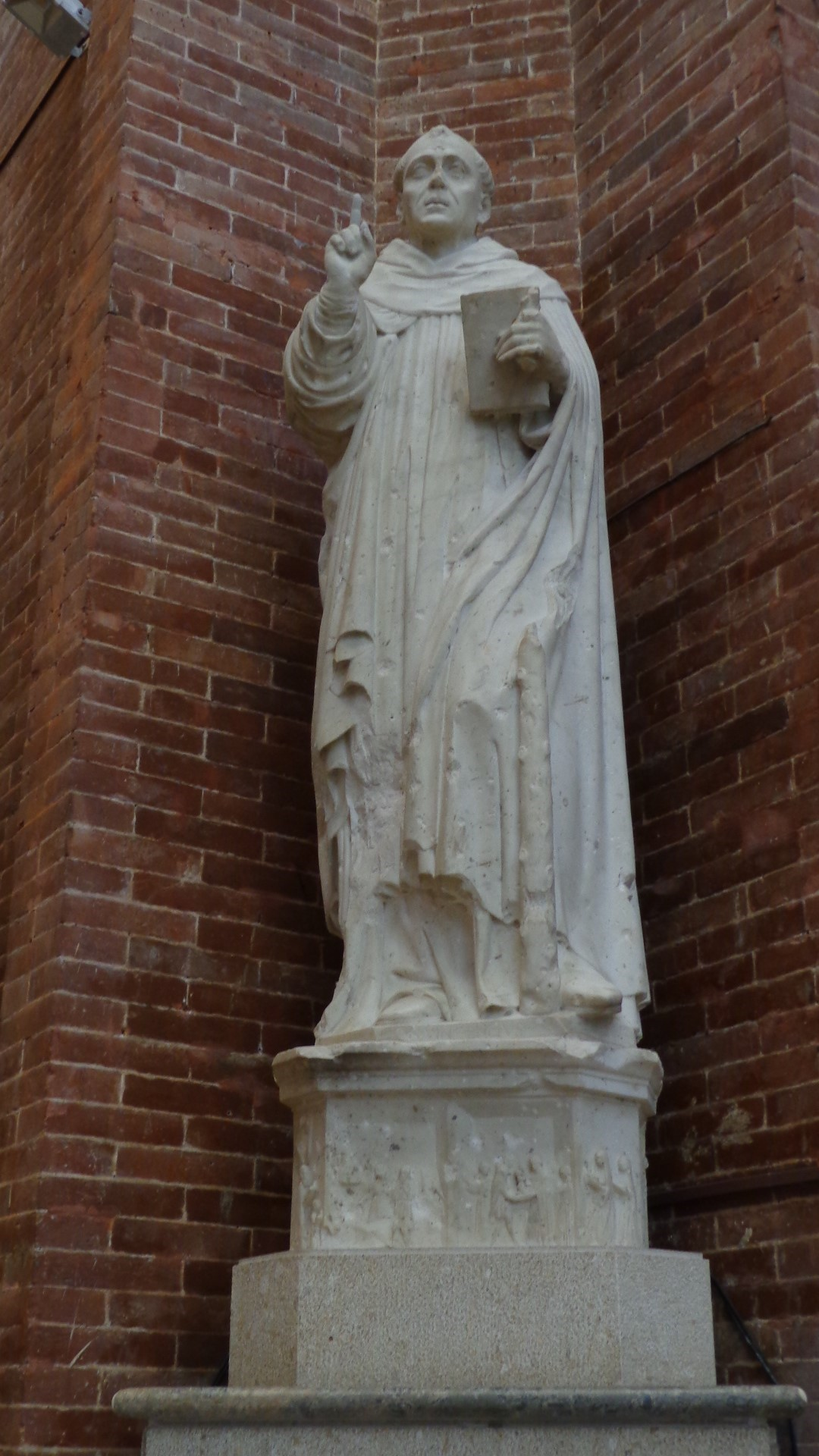
St Vincent Ferrer

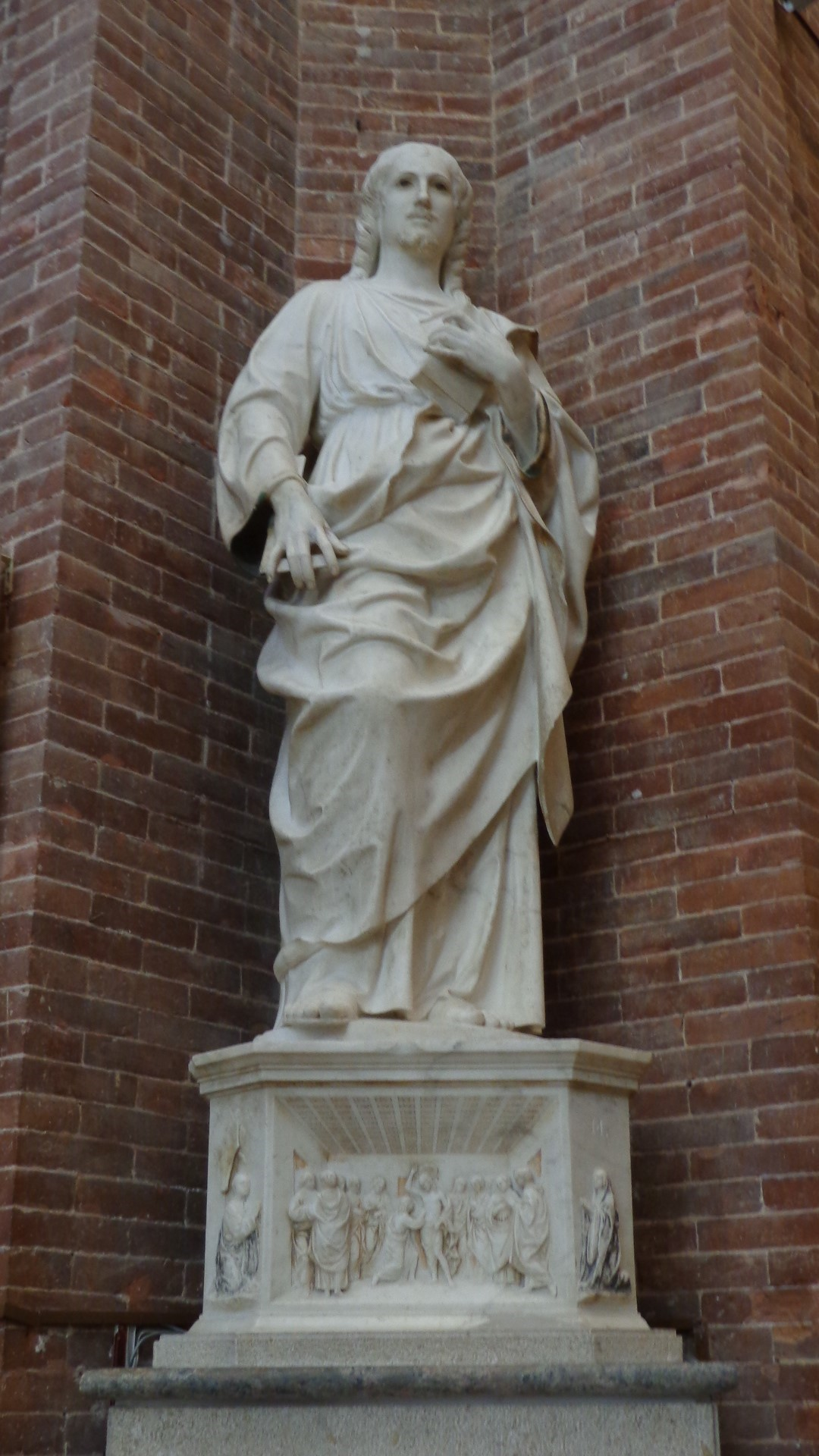
St Thomas the Apostle

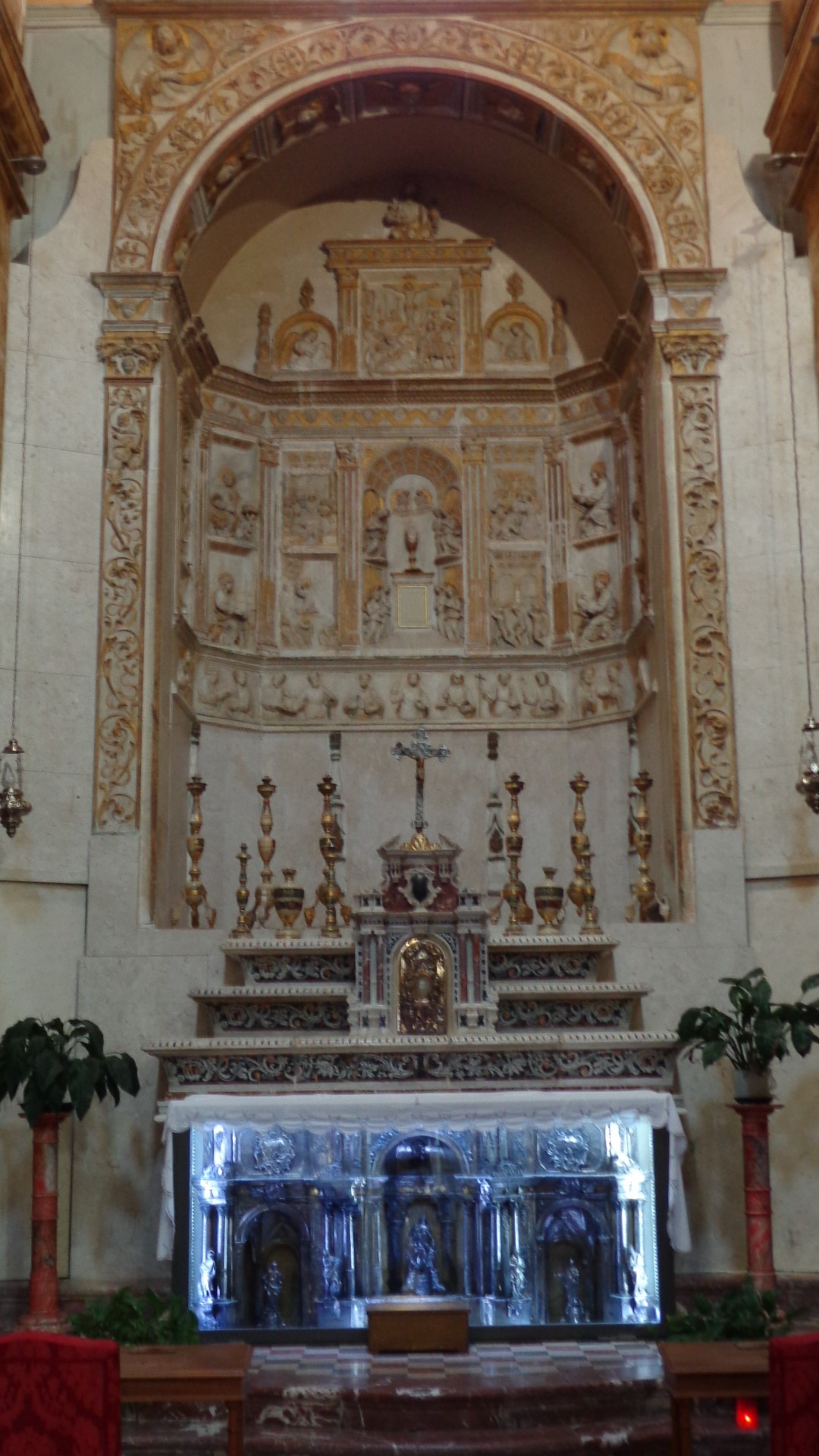
Icon in the Chapel of the Most Holy Sacrament

== Bibliography ==
- (in Italian) "Guida d'Italia" - "Sicilia", Touring Club Italiano.
- (in Italian) Gioacchino di Marzo, "I Gagini e la scultura in Sicilia nei secoli XV e XVI; memorie storiche e documenti", Conte Antonio Cavagna Sangiuliani di Gualdana Lazelada di Bereguardo, Volume I e II, Palermo, Stamperia del Giornale di Sicilia.
