= Apostolic Nunciature to Bulgaria =

Diplomatic Mission of the Holy See in Bulgaria

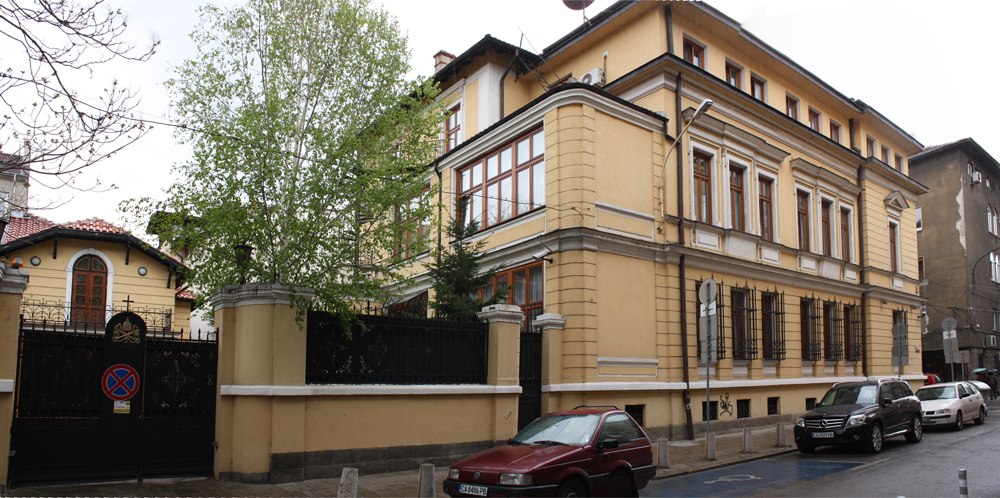
- Location: Sofia
- Address: 11, August 6 street, P.O. Box 9, 1000 Sofia, Bulgaria
- Coordinates: 42°41′55.1″N 23°19′10.2″E
- Apostolic Nuncio: Archbishop Luciano Suriani

The Apostolic Nunciature to Bulgaria is the diplomatic mission of the Holy See to Bulgaria. It is located in Sofia. The current Apostolic Nuncio is Archbishop Luciano Suriani, who was named to the position by Pope Francis on 13 May 2022.

The Apostolic Nunciature to the Republic of Bulgaria is an ecclesiastical office of the Catholic Church in Bulgaria, with the rank of an embassy. The nuncio serves both as the ambassador of the Holy See to the President of Bulgaria, and as delegate and point-of-contact between the Catholic hierarchy in Bulgaria and the Pope.

The Apostolic Nuncio to Bulgaria is usually also the Apostolic Nuncio to North Macedonia upon his appointment to said nation.

== Papal representatives to Bulgaria ==
Apostolic Delegates

- Angelo Giuseppe Roncalli (16 October 1931 - 30 November 1934)
- Giuseppe Mazzoli (15 December 1934 - 8 December 1945)
  - Following Mazzoli's death, the delegation was led briefly by an experienced lesser official of the delegation who was not allowed to return from a trip outside Bulgaria.

Apostolic Nuncios

- Mario Rizzi (28 February 1991 - 1996)
- Blasco Francisco Collaço (13 April 1996 - 24 May 2000)
- Antonio Mennini (8 July 2000 - 6 November 2002)
- Giuseppe Leanza (22 February 2003 - 22 February 2008)
- Januariusz Mikołaj Bolonek (24 May 2008 - 6 December 2013)
- Anselmo Guido Pecorari (25 April 2014 – 31 December 2021)
- Luciano Suriani (13 May 2022 – present)
