= Apostolic Nunciature to Zambia =

Diplomatic mission of the Holy See in Africa

The Apostolic Nunciature to Zambia is an ecclesiastical office of the Catholic Church in Zambia. It is a diplomatic post of the Holy See, whose representative is called the Apostolic Nuncio with the rank of an ambassador. The Apostolic Nuncio to Zambia is usually also the Apostolic Nuncio to Malawi upon his appointment to said nation.

== List of papal representatives ==
Apostolic Pro-Nuncios

- Alfredo Poledrini (27 October 1965 - 20 September 1971)
- Luciano Angeloni (24 December 1970 - 25 November 1978)
- Giorgio Zur (5 February 1979 - 3 May 1985)
- Eugenio Sbarbaro (14 September 1985 - 7 February 1991)

Apostolic Nuncios

- Giuseppe Leanza (4 June 1991 - 29 April 1999)
- Orlando Antonini (24 July 1999 - 16 November 2005)
- Nicola Girasoli (24 January 2006 - 29 October 2011)
- Julio Murat (27 January 2012 - 24 March 2018)
- Gianfranco Gallone (2 February 2019 – 3 January 2023)
- Gian Luca Perici (5 June 2023 – present)
