= Stagnone Lagoon =

Lagoon in Sicily

Coordinates: 37.872°N 12.4639°E

The Stagnone Lagoon is a part of Mediterranean Sea in front of Marsala City (Province of Trapani, autonomous region of Sicily); the Lagoon is delimited by an island called Isola Lunga (formerly stinco di Capra) because of its geographical long form.

Inside the Lagoon there are the famous Mozia island and another small island called Santa Maria.

The water level in the lagoon varies from a few centimetres to a maximum of 2 metres. A peculiarity of the Stagnone is that, during summer, the water is always hot due to its low level and the lagoon conformation.

== See also ==
- Venetian Lagoon
- Marano Lagoon
