= Marsala, Sicily =

Marsala
- Comune
- City of Marsala
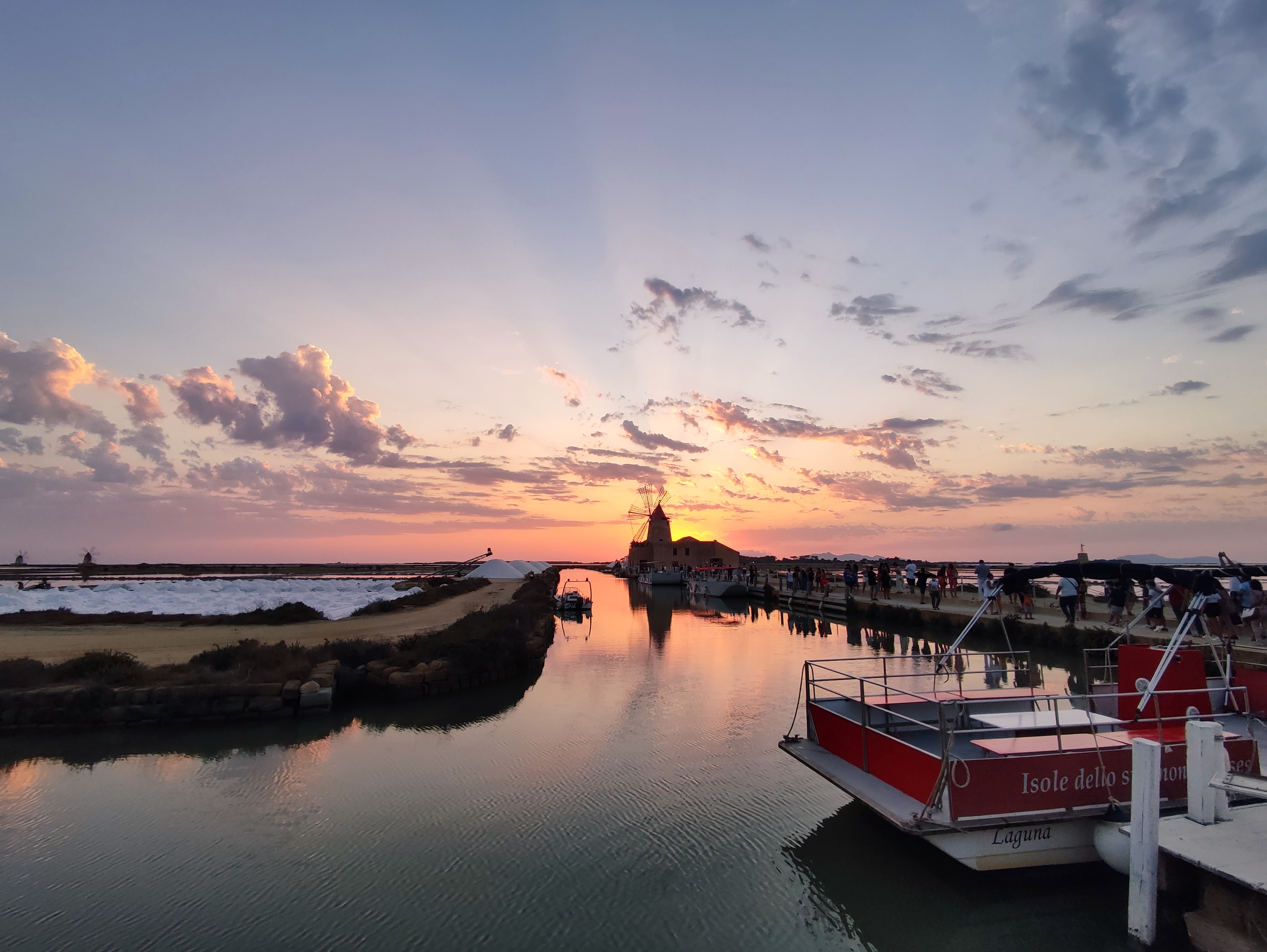
- View of the city's harbour and part of the Saline di Marsala in the background

- Flag Coat of arms

- Location within Italy Location within Sicily
- Coordinates: 37°47′53″N 12°26′03″E
- Country: Italy
- Region: Sicily
- Province: Trapani (TP)
- Founded: 396 BC

Government
  - Mayor: Andreana Maria Patti

Area
  - Total: 243.26 km^{2} (93.92 sq mi)
- Elevation: 3 m (9.8 ft)

Population (2025)
  - Total: 79,693
  - Density: 327.60/km^{2} (848.49/sq mi)
- Demonym(s): Marsalese; Lilibetano
- Time zone: UTC+1 (CET)
  - Summer (DST): UTC+2 (CEST)
- Postal code: 91025
- Dialing code: 0923
- ISTAT code: 081011
- Patron saint: Our Lady of the Cave (Madonna della Cava) and Saint John the Baptist
- Saint day: respectively 19 January and 24 June
- Website: comune.marsala.tp.it

Marsala (Italian: [marˈsaːla], local Sicilian: [maɪsˈsaːla]; Latin: Lilybaeum) is a city and comune located in the Province of Trapani in the westernmost part of Sicily. With a population of 79,693, Marsala is the fifth largest city in Sicily.

The town is famous for the docking of Giuseppe Garibaldi on 11 May 1860 (the Expedition of the Thousand) and for its Marsala wine. A feature of the area is the Stagnone Lagoon Natural Reserve – a marine area with salt ponds.

== Etymology ==
The modern name is likely derived from the Arabic مَرْسَى عَلِيّ (marsā ʿaliyy, "Ali's harbor"), or possibly مَرْسَى اللّٰه (marsā llāh, "God's harbor").

== History ==
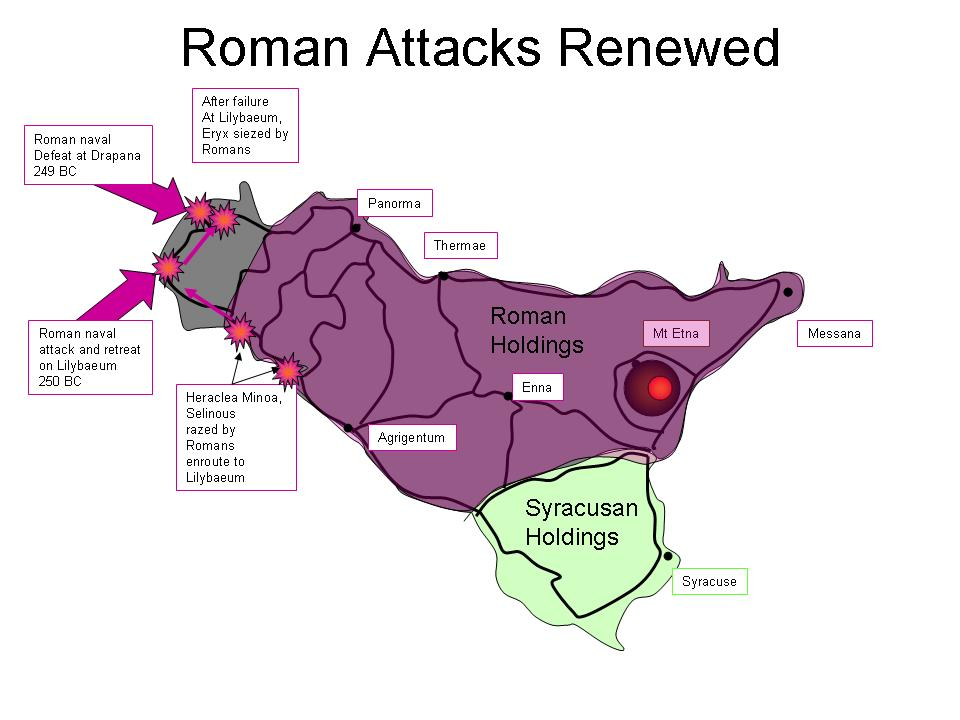
c. 250 BC, First Punic War

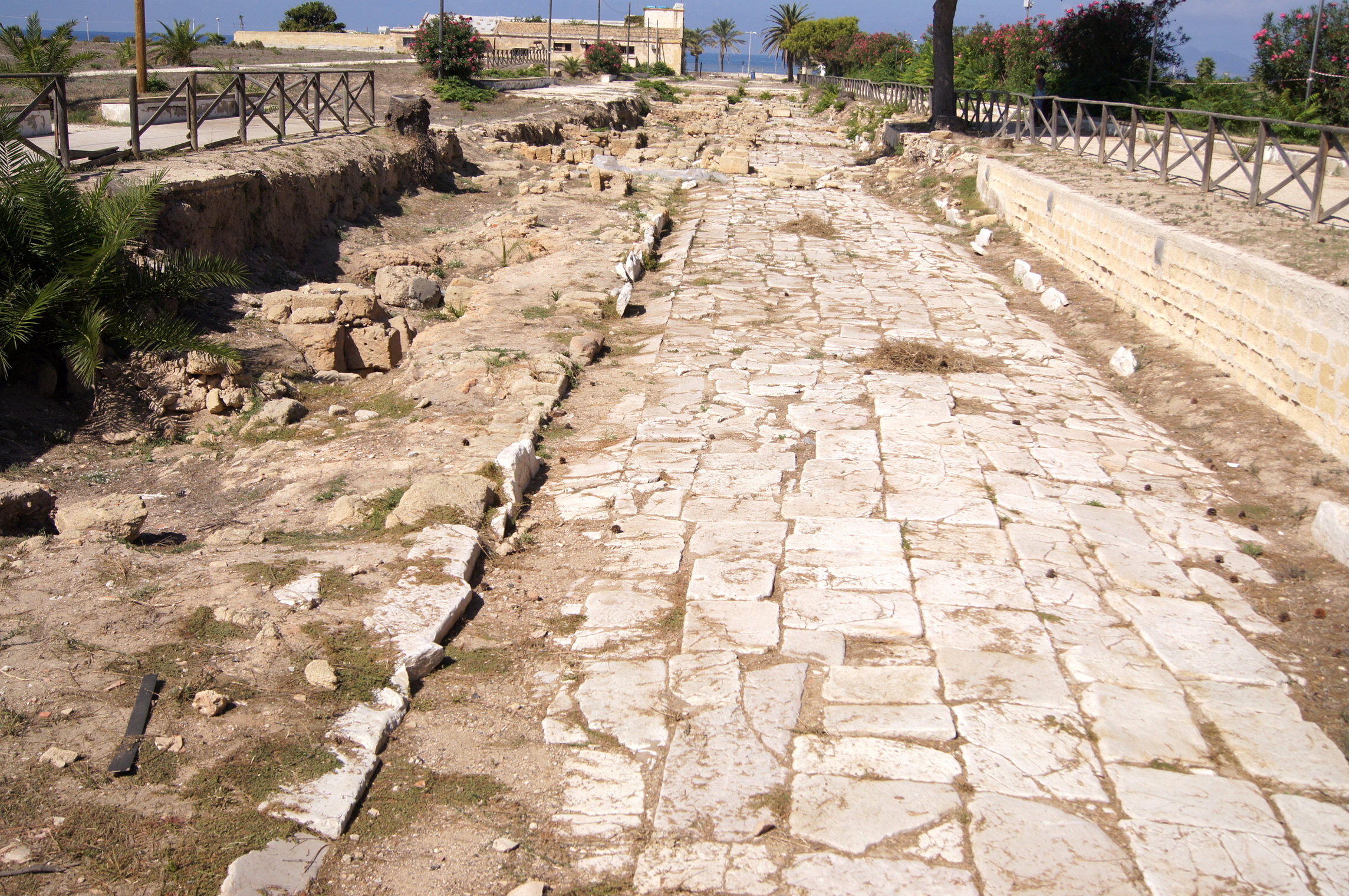
Ancient main street of Lilybaeum

=== Carthaginian Period ===
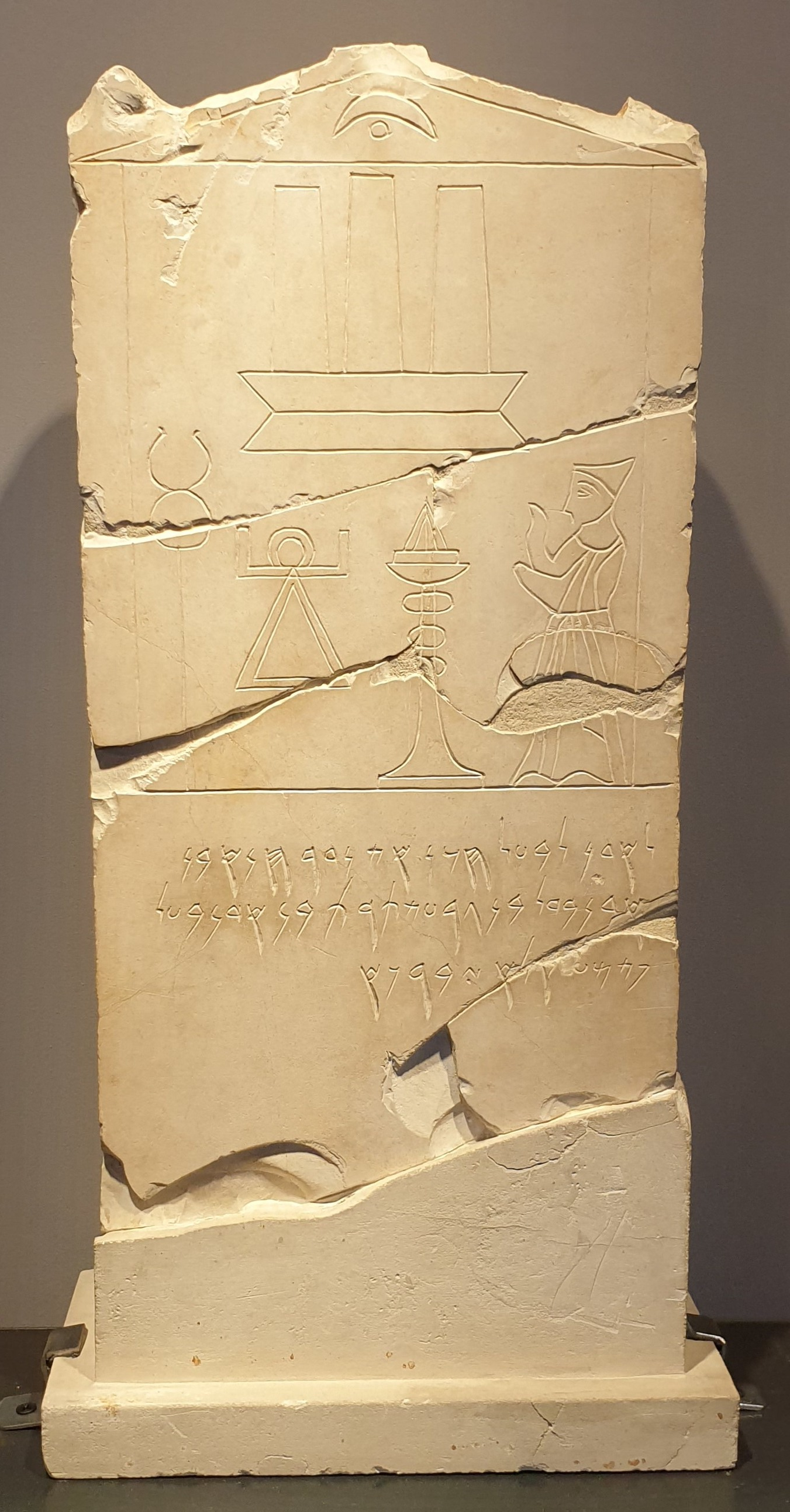
The Lilybaeum stele, showing a cultic scene and votive Punic inscription

The Carthaginian army sent to conquer Selinunte in 409 BC landed and camped near the site of the later Lilybaeum. In 397 BC when the Phoenician colony of Motya on the southwestern coast of Sicily was invaded and destroyed by the Syracusan tyrant Dionysius I, the survivors founded a town on the mainland nearby, the site of modern-day Marsala, which they called by a Punic name, recorded in Greek as Lilýbaion (Λιλύβαιον) and in Latin as Lilybaeum. Over the following two centuries, it became a trade centre for manufactured goods and served as a strategic port between Carthage and Carthaginian territories in Sardinia. It was built with strong defensive walls from the beginning and had three linked harbours. Punic Lilybaion was never conquered although it was besieged several times e.g. by Pyrrhus of Epirus and the Romans. The walls were ultimately over 10 metres (33 ft) high and 7 metres (23 ft) thick. They were strengthened for Pyrrhus' Siege of Lilybaeum in 278 BC by a second wall 10 metres (33 ft) from the first. The siege lasted 2 months before he withdrew. It was the only city which Pyrrhus could not conquer during his campaign at Sicily.

The First Punic War began here when the Punic army landed at Lilybaion in 265–264 BC, then marched across Sicily to Messina, where the opening clash of the war took place.

In 250 BC the Romans sent a huge naval expedition of up to 240 ships towards Lilybaeum, the Carthaginian headquarters. A massive Roman army of 4 legions under the two consuls was also sent. The Carthaginians also understood the importance of this port and put their whole force together to save the city including about 10,000 mercenaries (Celts and Greeks). The Carthaginians sailed 50 ships from Africa under the command of Hannibal to try to save the city by charging towards the centre of the harbour. The Romans did not attempt to stop the entry of the fleet because of their sudden appearance and unfavourable winds in a foreign port.

The Roman fleet was defeated at Drepana in 249 BC when attempting a surprise attack there, followed by the destruction of the rest of the fleet soon afterwards in a storm. This forced the Romans to settle in for a long siege.

The Siege of Lilybaeum (250 BC) lasted for 9 years without Roman success. Carthage was able to reinforce and re-supply Lilybaeum during the war. Some of the Gallic mercenaries planned to betray the city but Alexon, who had previously saved Agrigentum from similar treachery, foiled the plot by informing the Carthaginian commander Himilco.

In 241 BC the city was given to the Romans as part of the peace treaty ending the First Punic War and then became one of the most important cities in Sicily.

=== Roman Lilybaeum ===
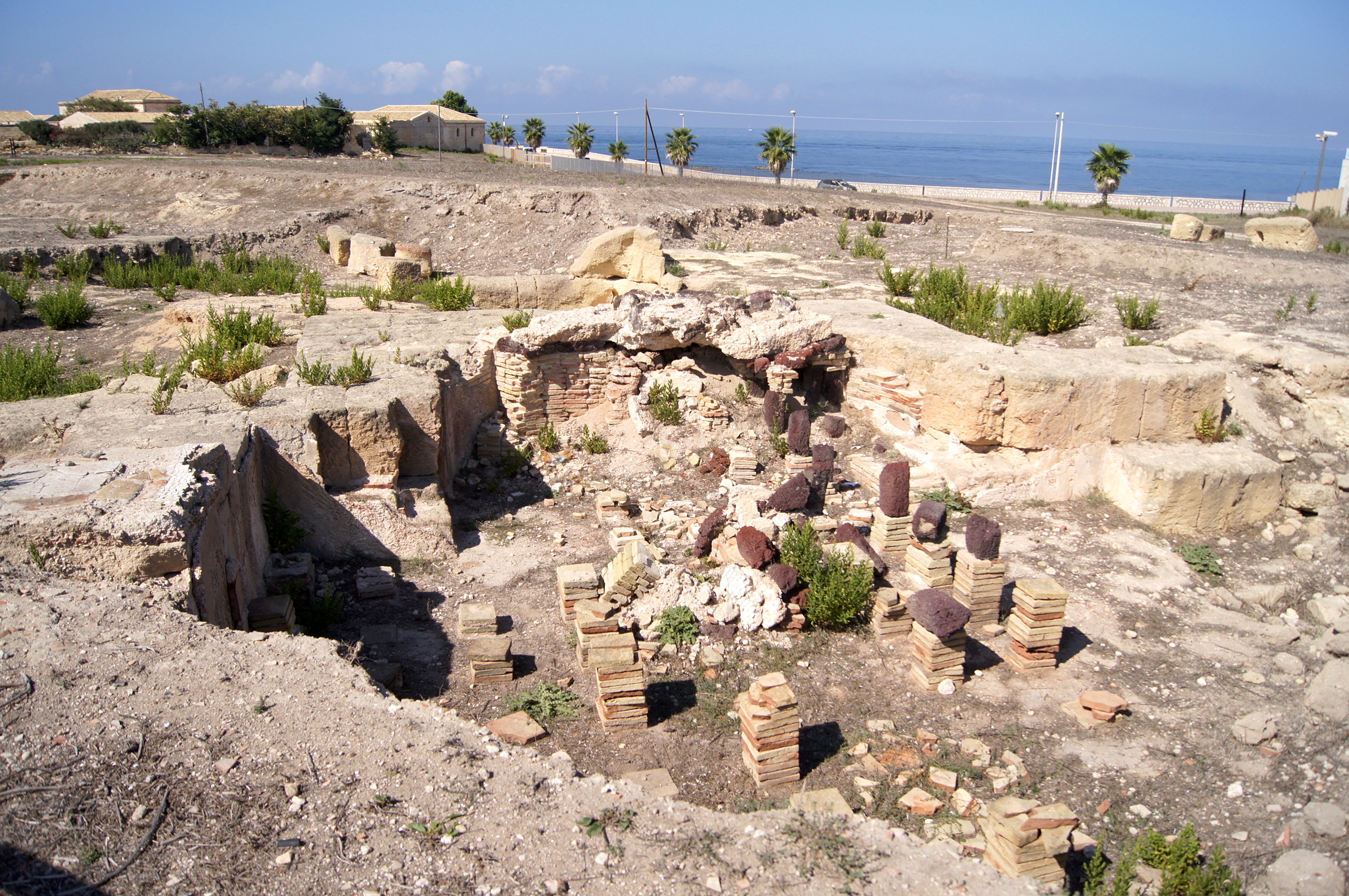
Roman baths Lilybaeum

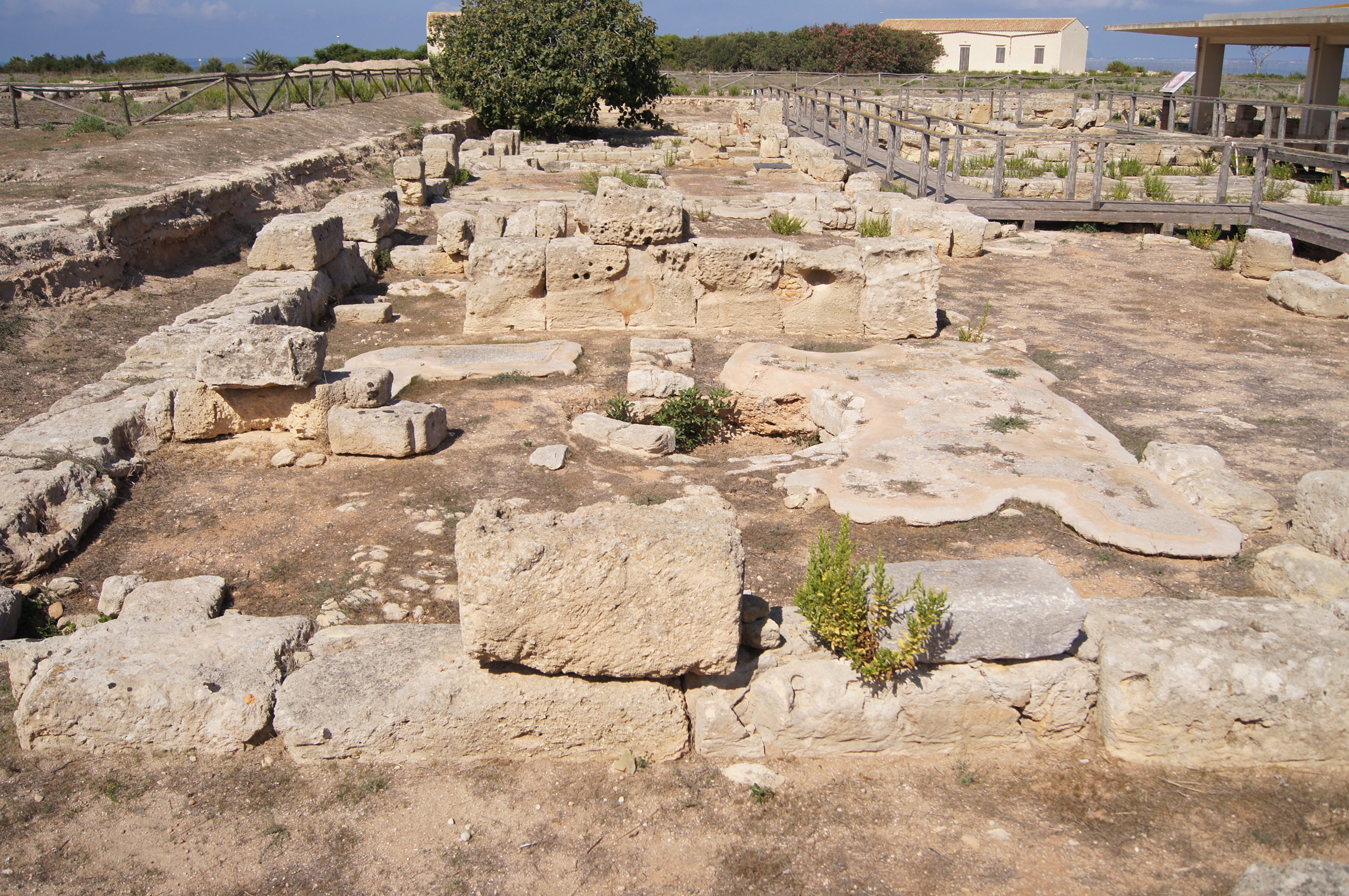
Town houses, Lilybaeum

In 218 BC, in the Second Punic War, the Battle of Lilybaeum was fought between the navies of Carthage and Rome when Carthage attempted a secret raid on the city to re-establish a base. Marcus Aemilius Lepidus, the praetor at Lilybaeum, was told about the impending raid and prepared his 20 ships which managed to defeat the 50 opposing quinqueremes.

In the republican period the city was enriched with mansions and public buildings and dubbed splendidissima urbs by Cicero, who served as quaestor in the region between 76 and 75 BC. During the Civil Wars Lilybaeum was twice besieged, in 43 BC by Sextus Pompeius and 38 by Lepidus during which the walls were further strengthened as shown by an inscription.

The city walls were abandoned in the 4th c. AD as shown by buildings erected over or beside the walls.

=== Post-Roman Period ===
The city was the seat of the Diocese of Lilybaeum from at least the early 5th century AD. Ravaged by Vandals during the 5th century AD, the town was annexed in the 6th century to Justinian's Byzantine Empire. In this period the town was struck by dysentery, raided by pirates, and neglected by Constantinople. The arrival of the Arabs at the nearby Granitola mount in the 8th century entailed the resumption of commerce and the start of the rebirth of the town. The town was renamed Marsa ʿAlī "ʿAlī's harbour" or maybe, Marsa ʿāliyy, "Big harbour", for the width of the ancient harbour, placed near Punta d'Alga. Another possible derivation is Marsa Allāh, "God's harbour".

Since the end of the 11th century, the area has been conquered by Norman, Angevin and Aragonese troops. During this time, Marsala became wealthy, primarily through trade. However the blocking up of the harbour of Punta Alga, decreed by Emperor Charles V so as to stop Saracen forays, brought an end to this period of prosperity.

The development of Marsala wine at the end of the 18th century, headed by English merchants settled in Sicily, considerably improved local trade. This triggered an economic expansion in Marsala, including the funding of infrastructure projects such as the current harbour of Margitello.

On 11 May 1860 Giuseppe Garibaldi landed at Marsala, beginning the process of Italian unification.

On 11 May 1943, in the lead-up to the World War II Allied invasion of Sicily, an Allied bombardment of the town permanently damaged its Baroque centre and claimed many victims: "Marsala Wiped Off the Map" titled the New York Times on 13 May 1943.

=== Mythology ===
In Greek mythology, Butes was the only Argonaut who jumped in the sea while sailing past the Sirens because he couldn't resist the charm of their singing, but Aphrodite saved him and transferred him to Lilybaeum.

=== Archaeology ===
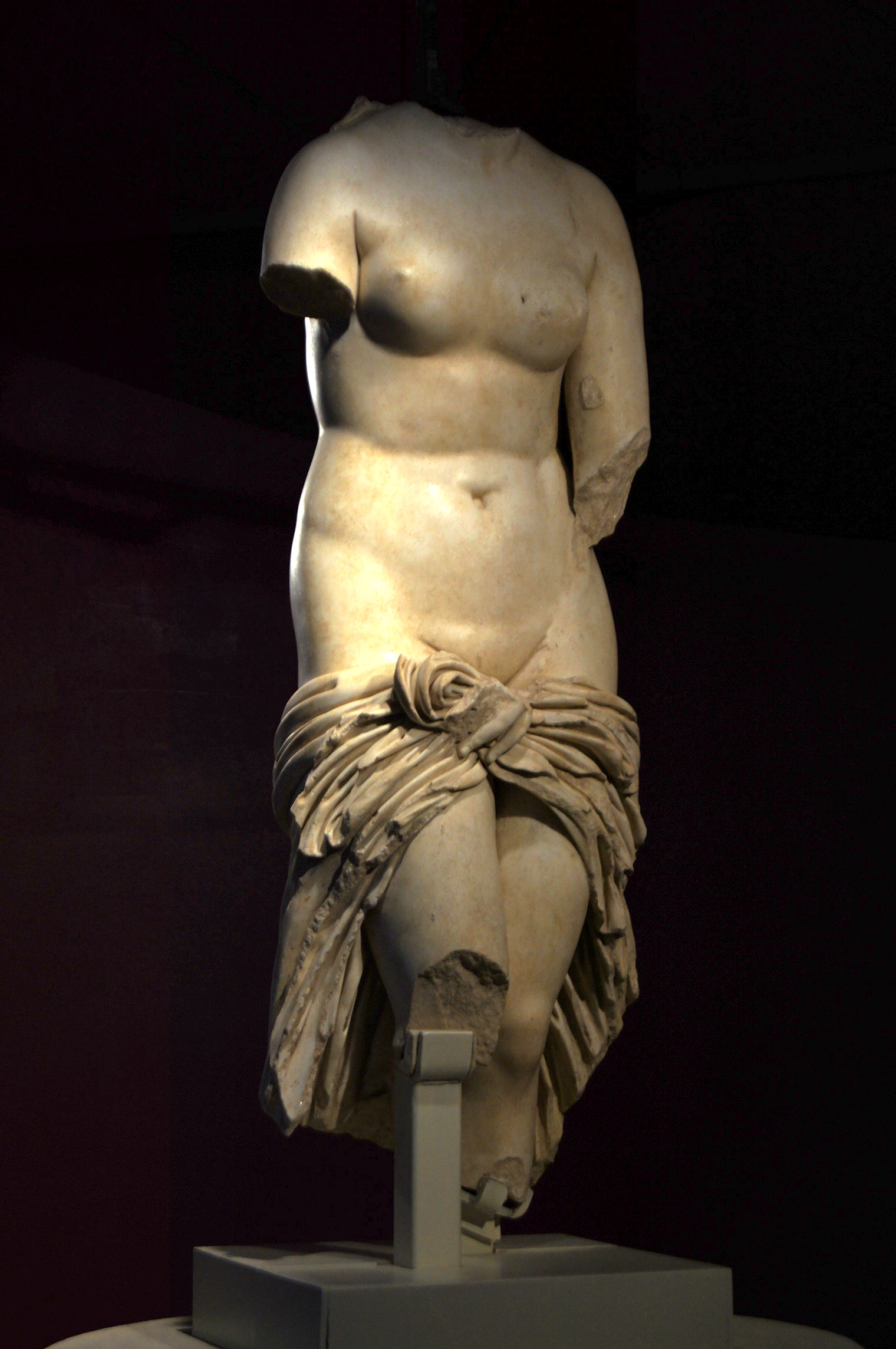
Venus of Lilybaeum

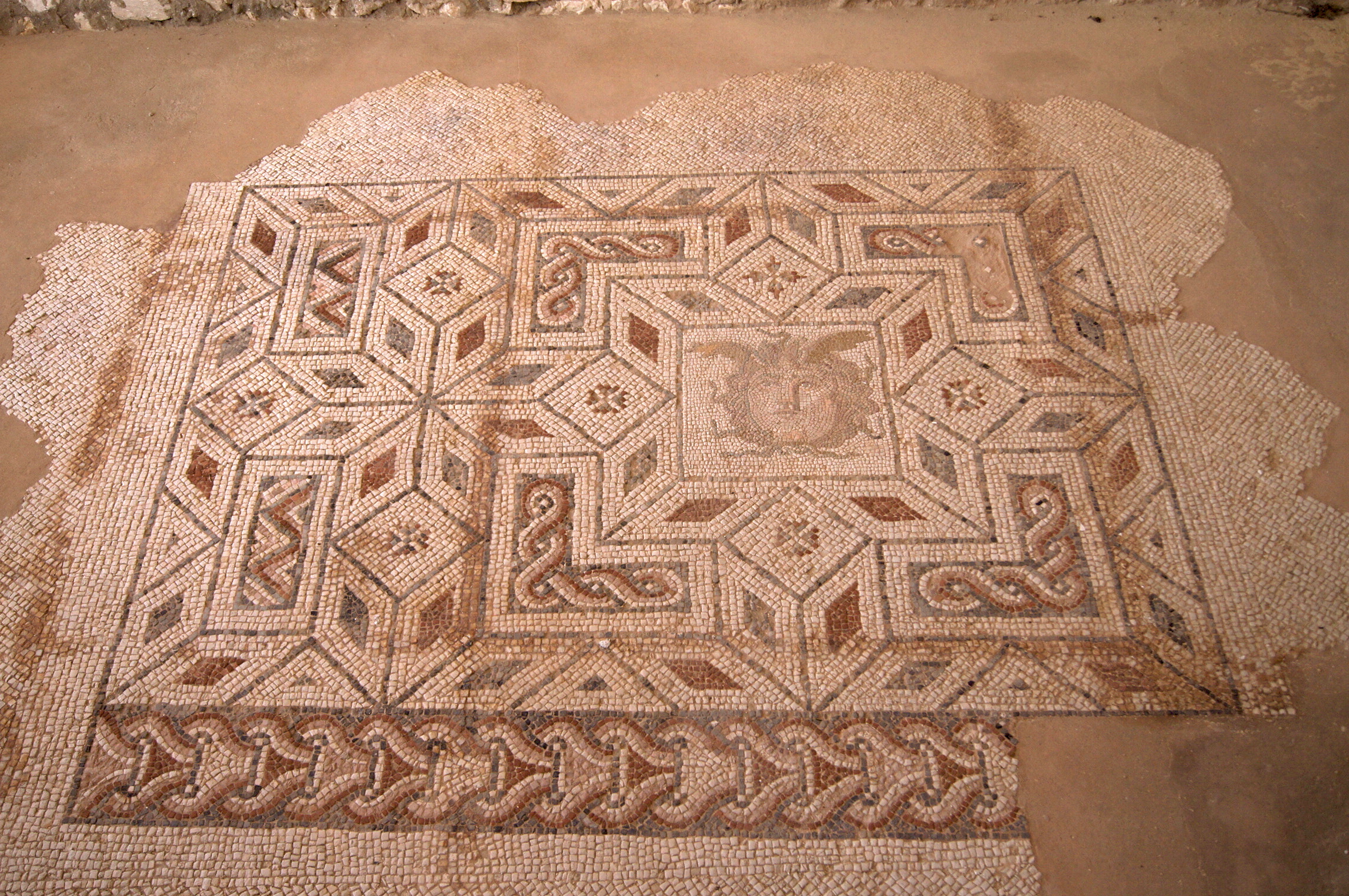
Mosaic floor: Domus of Boeo

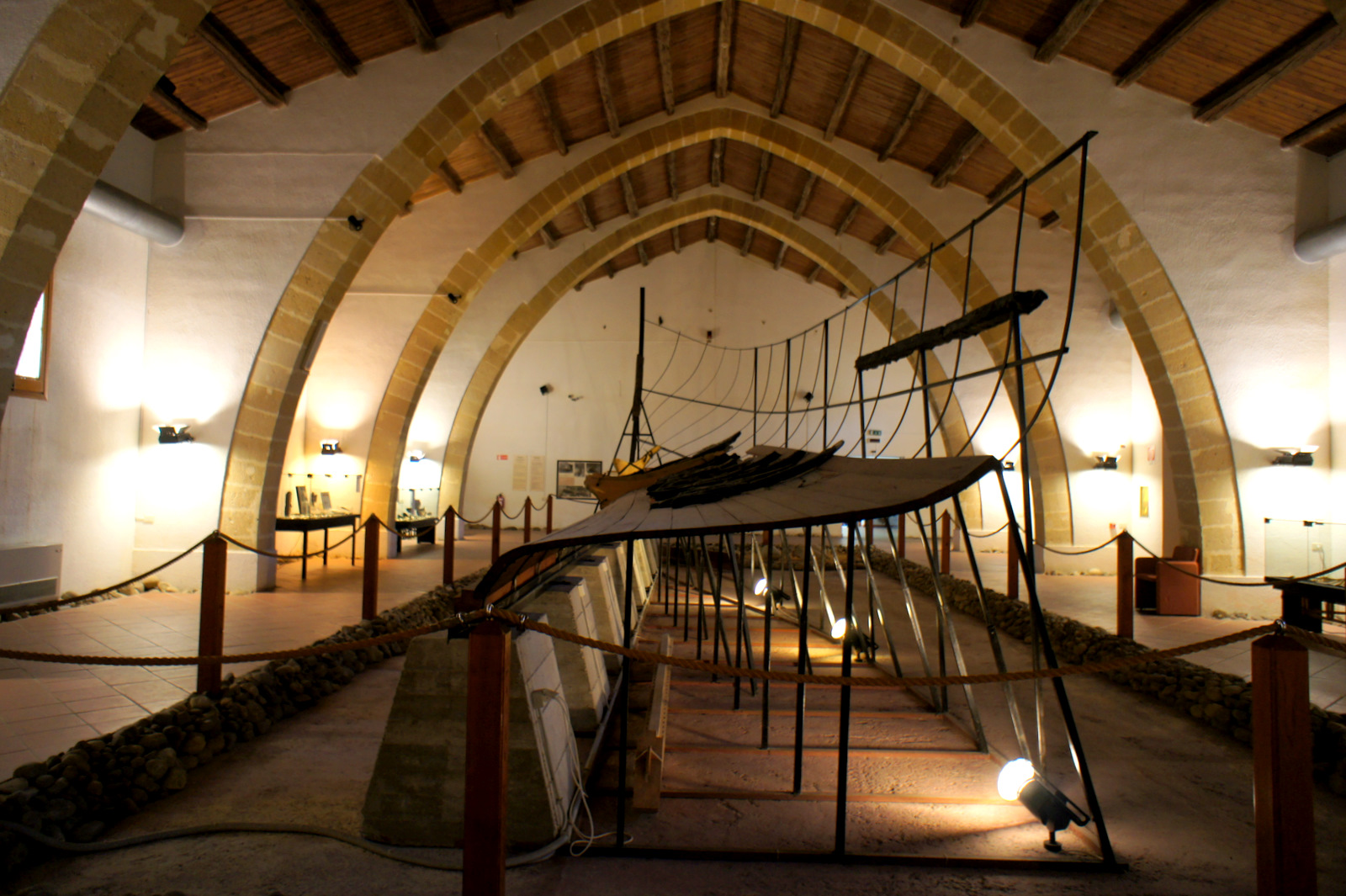
Carthaginian ship (240 BC)

The archaeological area of Marsala has been investigated both through excavations and topographic studies. Lilybaeum, the ancient town, took up a rectangular area on Capo Boeo, a low and rocky promontory sloping gently down towards the sea. The urban layout of the town can be dated back to the 2nd century BC with modern-day Viale Vittorio Veneto the Decumanus Maximus and Viale Cesare Battisti the Cardo Maximus.

Based on the archaeological findings at Capo Boeo, Lilybaeum was rebuilt twice, in the 1st century BC and in the 3rd century AD. There is not enough evidence to associate the latter with the 365 Crete earthquake, even though literature and archaeological discoveries elsewhere show that other Sicilian towns, such as Selinunte, were affected.

Several fragments of the city walls and floors and walls of public and private buildings are visible. Excavations in several places under the modern city have revealed rich mosaic floors in town houses.

The Baglio Anselmi Archaeological Museum houses an example of Carthaginian ship possibly used during the Battle of the Aegates Islands (241 BC) found on the seabed off the coast of Marsala, as well as other ancient remains from the area, such as pottery, marble sculptures and mosaics. Many fine painted tombs and funerary monuments have been excavated showing unique preservation of colours.

The three entrance gates into the town dating from Norman times: Porta Nuova, Porta di Mare and Porta Mazara were rebuilt in the 17th and 18th centuries in a much grander form: Porta Mazara, (English: "Mazara Gate") rebuilt in 1572, located in the south-east; Porta di Mare (English: "Sea Gate") (renamed to Porta Garibaldi), rebuilt in 1685, located in the south-west of the town; Porta Nuova (English: "New Gate") was rebuilt in 1790, and is located in the north-west of the town. The city council decided to demolish the city walls in 1887 to make way for the rapidly-expanding town. Along with this demolition was demolished the north-east gate called Porta Trapani, constructed in the early 17th century, nicknamed "Porticella" due to its small size in comparison to the other three gates of the town; it used to be located at the intersection of Via Pellegrino and Via Sardegna.

== Geography ==
Situated at the extreme western point of Sicily, the town was founded on Lilibeo Cape from where the Aegadian Islands and the Stagnone Lagoon can be seen.

=== Territory ===
The territory of Marsala, 241 square kilometres (93 sq mi), has a rich cultural and landscape heritage; its area includes the Stagnone Lagoon, a Natural Reserve in which is located the island of Mozia.

The city of Marsala had a population of about 86,000 until the end of 1970, when Petrosino, a village formerly part of Marsala, decided to become a self-governing town after a local referendum.

The area of Marsala is classified as a seismic zone 2 (medium). In the last 200 years three earthquakes of medium-high intensity were recorded:

- 18 May 1828 – magnitude 5.17 (about VI Mercalli scale).
- 15 January 1968 – Belice earthquake which in Marsala reached VII Mercalli scale (although its intensity was as high as X in other locations).
- 7 June 1981 – magnitude 4.60 (IV–V scala Mercalli scale) with epicentre in Borgo Elefante in Mazara del Vallo, about 20 kilometres (12 mi) from the town-centre of Marsala.

=== Climate ===
Marsala has a hot-summer mediterranean climate (Köppen: Csa), similar to most coastal towns in Sicily, with hot and dry summers coupled with moderately wet and mild winters. Weather in Marsala is similar to that of nearby Trapani.

Summers are generally warm with a record maximum temperature of 37 °C (99 °F) in August 2017. In the summer, due to how dry it is, it is not unusual to experience the effect of Sirocco wind, which brings dust and sand from the Sahara.

Winters are generally rainy and cooler with temperatures ranging between minimum of 1 °C (34 °F) (in December 2014) and 21 °C (70 °F). Snowfall occurs very rarely, since the temperature has never dropped below freezing, although snow has fallen before, for example in December 2014.

Climate data for Marsala, Sicily (Temperatures 1961–1990; humidity, sunlight and precipitation 1973–present)
Month	Jan	Feb	Mar	Apr	May	Jun	Jul	Aug	Sep	Oct	Nov	Dec	Year
Record high °C (°F)	22.0 (71.6)	21.6 (70.9)	23.2 (73.8)	26.0 (78.8)	30.4 (86.7)	34.0 (93.2)	35.0 (95.0)	37.0 (98.6)	32.5 (90.5)	31.0 (87.8)	26.2 (79.2)	24.8 (76.6)	37.0 (98.6)
Mean daily maximum °C (°F)	16.0 (60.8)	16.2 (61.2)	18.1 (64.6)	21.0 (69.8)	22.9 (73.2)	26.9 (80.4)	29.4 (84.9)	30.3 (86.5)	28.0 (82.4)	24.3 (75.7)	20.4 (68.7)	17.1 (62.8)	22.4 (72.3)
Daily mean °C (°F)	11.8 (53.2)	12.0 (53.6)	13.6 (56.5)	16.3 (61.3)	18.2 (64.8)	21.9 (71.4)	24.1 (75.4)	24.7 (76.5)	23.0 (73.4)	19.6 (67.3)	16.2 (61.2)	13.1 (55.6)	17.7 (63.9)
Mean daily minimum °C (°F)	7.7 (45.9)	7.8 (46.0)	9.1 (48.4)	11.6 (52.9)	13.6 (56.5)	16.8 (62.2)	18.8 (65.8)	19.2 (66.6)	18.0 (64.4)	14.8 (58.6)	12.0 (53.6)	9.1 (48.4)	13.1 (55.6)
Record low °C (°F)	1.2 (34.2)	2.0 (35.6)	2.0 (35.6)	5.5 (41.9)	8.7 (47.7)	12.0 (53.6)	13.6 (56.5)	14.3 (57.7)	12.0 (53.6)	9.0 (48.2)	5.5 (41.9)	3.2 (37.8)	1.2 (34.2)
Average precipitation mm (inches)	56 (2.2)	46 (1.8)	45 (1.8)	37 (1.5)	17 (0.7)	5 (0.2)	2 (0.1)	9 (0.4)	42 (1.7)	61 (2.4)	65 (2.6)	65 (2.6)	450 (17.7)
Average relative humidity (%) (daily average)	82	81	80	76	74	72	72	74	76	79	82	82	77.5
Mean daily sunshine hours	5	5	6	7	9	11	12	11	9	7	5	4	7.58
Source 1: Archivio Climatico - Enea
Source 2: Clima Marsala - Medie climatiche

== Demographics ==
Historical population
Year	Pop.	±%
1861	29,012	—
1871	31,384	+8.2%
1881	36,903	+17.6%
1901	53,173	+44.1%
1911	63,803	+20.0%
1921	70,442	+10.4%
1931	52,804	−25.0%
1936	57,171	+8.3%
1951	69,483	+21.5%
1961	75,347	+8.4%
1971	73,492	−2.5%
1981	79,175	+7.7%
1991	80,177	+1.3%
2001	77,784	−3.0%
2011	80,218	+3.1%
2021	80,474	+0.3%
Source: ISTAT

As of 2025, there are 79,693 people residing in Marsala, of whom 49.7% are male and 50.3% are female. Minors make up 15.2% of the population, and pensioners make up 25.0%. This compares with the Italian average of 14.9% minors and 24.7% pensioners.

== Economy ==
The economy of Marsala still depends on the production of wine, although tourism is a growing industry and it too is becoming an important source of income for the city. With its 14-kilometre (8.7 mi) coastline of sandy beaches and clear sea, access to the nearby Aegadian Islands and the natural environment of the Saline Della Laguna and Stagnone Lagoon, Marsala is an important Sicilian tourist destination.

== Main sights ==
=== Religious architecture ===
- Marsala Cathedral (17th century), dedicated to Saint Thomas of Canterbury and built on the site of a Norman predecessor from 1176. There is an organ with 4,317 pipes.
- Church of Purgatorio.
- Church of Addolorata.
- Church of Itriella.
- Convent, church and belfry of the Carmine.
- Church of Saint Matthew.
- Church and monastery of Saint Peter.
- Church of Saint John the Baptist.

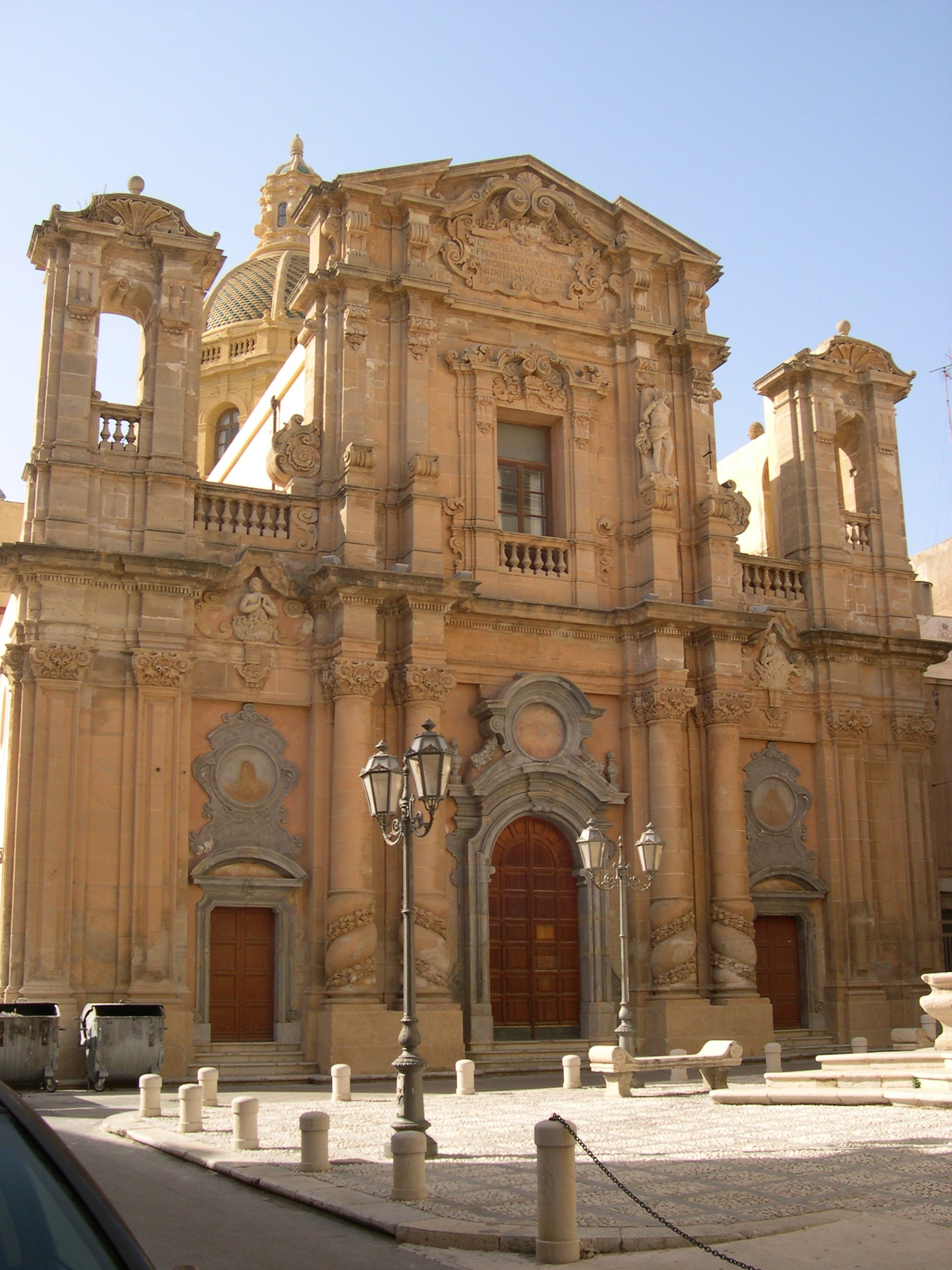
Church of Purgatorio, currently housing the Auditorium Santa Cecilia

=== Civil architecture ===
- Spanish Quarters (Town Hall).
- VII April Palace (16th–17th century), built on the site of the Lodge of Pisani.
- Fici Palace.
- Grignani Palace.
- Spanò-Burgio Palace.
- Communal theatre, built in 19th Century, consists in 300 seats, reopened in 1994 and dedicated to Eliodoro Sollima.
- Cine Teatro Impero, built during Fascism.
- Agricultural Technical Institute With Specialized School Wine "Abele Damiani" Marsala – Aggregate IPSAA Strasatti With Hospitality Section (state public high school).

=== Military architecture ===
- Villa Araba, Carabinieri (military police, and public security), Command Company and Operative Centre.
- Castle of Marsala (formerly a State Prison up to a few years ago).
- Ancient Gates and walls of Marsala.

== Culture ==
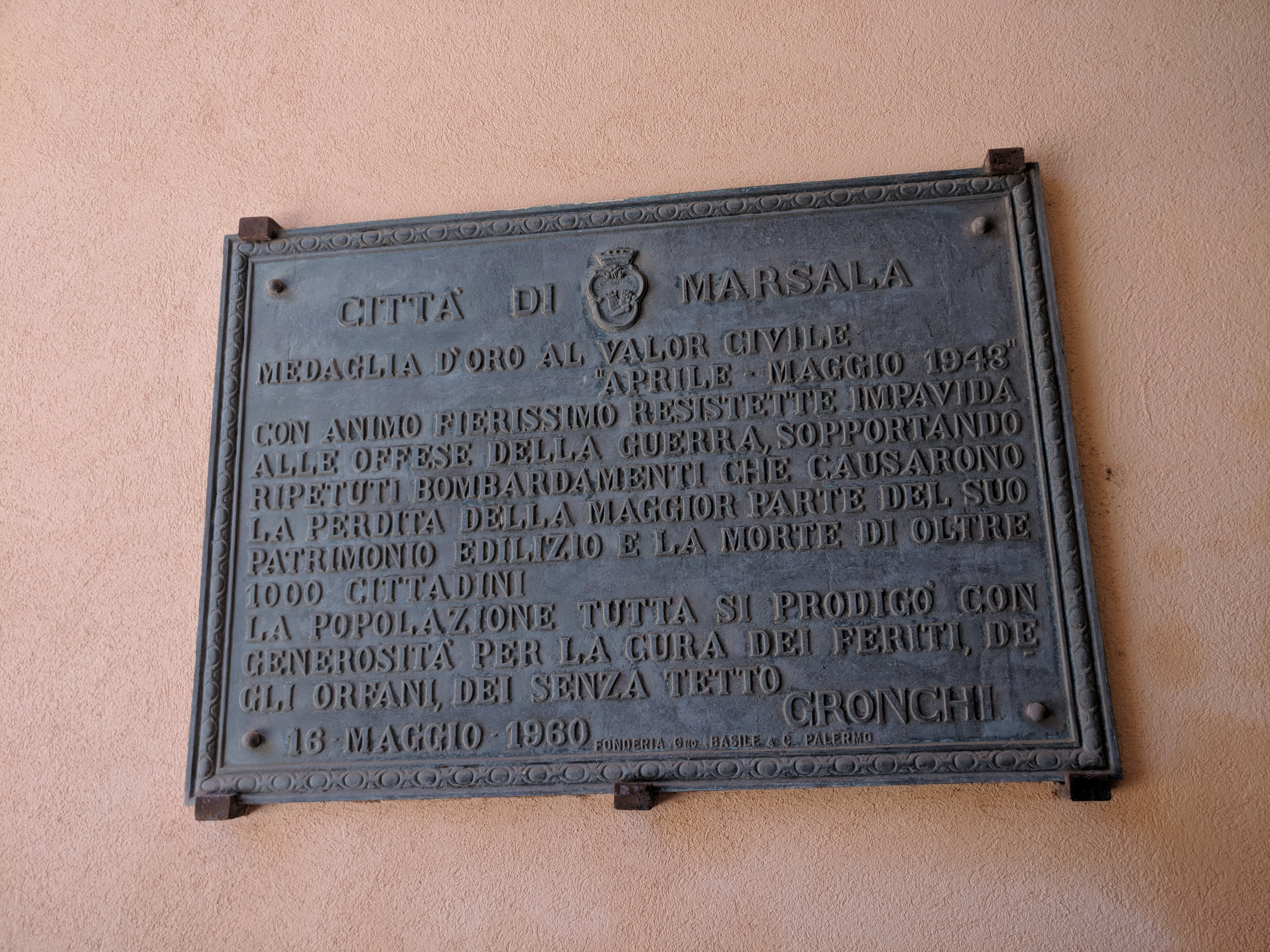
Marsala's Award for Civil Valor

Large-scale wine production started in 1773, encouraged by English trader John Woodhouse. Important winemaking establishments include Ingham-Whitaker, le Cantine Florio, Martinez, Pellegrino, Rallo, Mineo, Bianchi, Baglio Hopps, Donnafugata, Alagna, Caruso e Minini. Marsala cellars produce also red and white wines. Varieties include Alcesti, De Bartoli, Fina, Vinci, Birgi, Mothia, Paolini e Baglio Oro. In 2012, Marsala was named the European Capital of Wine.

== Notable people ==
- Giulia Adamo
- Alborosie
- Ignazio Boschetto, tenor of the Italian operatic pop group Il Volo
- Michele Genna
- Angelo "Bloody Angelo" Genna
- Vincenzo Genna
- Antonio Genna Jr.
- Joe Masseria

== Twin towns – sister cities ==
Marsala is twinned with:

- Kelibia, Tunisia
- Modica, Italy
- Nysa County, Poland
- Porto, Portugal
