= Anselmo Guido Pecorari =

Italian prelate

His Excellency, The Most Reverend Anselmo Guido Pecorari
- Apostolic Nuncio emeritus to Bulgaria and North Macedonia; Titular Archbishop of Populonia
- Appointed: 25 April 2014
- Retired: 31 December 2021
- Predecessor: Janusz Bolonek
- Successor: Luciano Suriani
- Other post: Titular Archbishop of Populonia
- Previous posts: Apostolic Nuncio to Uruguay (2008–14); Apostolic Nuncio to Rwanda (2003–08)

Orders
- Ordination: 27 September 1970
- Consecration: 11 January 2004 by Angelo Sodano, Egidio Caporello and Oscar Rizzato

Personal details
- Born: May 19, 1946 (age 80) Sermide, Italy
- Education: Pontifical University of Saint Thomas Aquinas
- Motto: Pastor Et Viator

Styles of Anselmo Guido Pecorari
- Reference style: His Excellency; The Most Reverend
- Spoken style: Your Excellency
- Religious style: Archbishop

Anselmo Guido Pecorari (born 19 May 1946) is an Italian prelate of the Catholic Church who worked in the diplomatic service of the Holy See from 1980 until he retired in 2021. He became an archbishop in 2003 and held the position of apostolic nuncio in several countries between 2003 and 2021.

== Biography ==
Ordained a priest on 27 September 1970, he is an expert in Ecclesiastical Law and Roman Catholic theology.

Pecorari earned a Doctorate in Sacred Theology in 1977 and a Doctorate in Canon Law in 1980, both from the Pontifical University of St. Thomas Aquinas, Angelicum in Rome.

== Diplomatic career ==
To prepare for a diplomatic career he entered the Pontifical Ecclesiastical Academy in 1977.

Active since 1980 in the diplomatic service of the Holy See. First, he served in Liberia, Spain, Ireland and Slovenia. In 1981 he received the title Chaplain of His Holiness (Monsignore) and in 1991 the title Honorary Prelate of His Holiness.

On 29 November 2003 he was appointed titular archbishop of Populonia and Apostolic Nuncio to Rwanda.

Pope Benedict XVI named him Apostolic Nuncio to Uruguay on 24 May 2008.

Pope Francis named him Nuncio to Bulgaria on 25 April 2014 and to Macedonia as well on 11 July. He ended his service in both positions on 31 December 2021.

== See also ==
- List of heads of the diplomatic missions of the Holy See
