= Luciano Angeloni =

Italian prelate

- Titular Archbishop of Vibo
- Church: Catholic Church
- In office: 24 December 1970 – 9 May 1996
- Predecessor: Andreas Rohracher
- Successor: Aldo Cavalli
- Previous posts: Apostolic Nuncio to Portugal (1989-1993); Apostolic Nuncio to Lebanon (1982-1989); Apostolic Pro-Nuncio to Korea (1978-1982); Apostolic Pro-Nuncio to Zambia & Malawi (1970-1978)

Orders
- Ordination: 18 August 1940 by Angelo Cambiaso
- Consecration: 7 February 1971 by Paolo Bertoli

Personal details
- Born: 2 December 1917 Imperia, Province of Imperia, Kingdom of Italy
- Died: 9 May 1996 (aged 78) Albenga, Province of Savona, Italy

Luciano Angeloni (2 December 1917 – 9 May 1996) was an Italian prelate of the Catholic Church who spent his career in the diplomatic service of the Holy See.

== Biography ==
Luciano Angeloni was born in Imperia, Italy, on 2 December 1917. He was ordained a priest on 18 August 1940.

To prepare for a diplomatic career he entered the Pontifical Ecclesiastical Academy in 1953.

On 24 December 1970, Pope Paul VI appointed him a titular archbishop and Apostolic Pro-Nuncio to Malawi and to Zambia. His received his episcopal consecration on 7 February 1971 from Cardinal Paolo Bertoli.

On 25 November 1978, Pope John Paul II named him Apostolic Pro-Nuncio to Korea.

On 21 August 1981, he was appointed Apostolic Nuncio to Lebanon.

On 31 July 1989, he was appointed Apostolic Nuncio to Portugal.

His service as nuncio ended with the appointment of his successor on 15 March 1993.

On 29 November 1993 he was named a consultor to the Secretariat of State and on 25 January 1994 he was appointed to a 5-year term as a member of the Congregation for the Evangelization of Peoples.

He died on 9 May 1996.
