= Apostolic Nunciature to North Macedonia =

Diplomatic Representative of the Holy See in North Macedonia

The Apostolic Nunciature to North Macedonia is an ecclesiastical office of the Catholic Church in North Macedonia. It is a diplomatic post of the Holy See, whose representative is called the Apostolic Nuncio with the rank of an ambassador. The title Apostolic Nuncio to North Macedonia is held by the prelate appointed Apostolic Nuncio to Bulgaria; he resides in Bulgaria.

== Representatives of the Holy See to North Macedonia ==
- Edmond Farhat (26 July 1995 - 11 December 2001)
- Marian Oleś (11 December 2001 - 1 May 2002)
- Giuseppe Leanza (18 May 2002 - 22 February 2003)
- Santos Abril y Castelló (12 April 2003 - 9 January 2011)
- Janusz Bolonek (4 May 2011 - 6 December 2013)
- Anselmo Guido Pecorari (11 July 2014 – 31 December 2021)
- Luciano Suriani (21 May 2022 - present)

== See also ==
- Foreign relations of the Holy See
- List of diplomatic missions of the Holy See
