= Apostolic Nunciature to Malawi =

Diplomatic post of the Holy See

The Apostolic Nunciature to Malawi is an ecclesiastical office of the Catholic Church in Malawi. It is a diplomatic post of the Holy See, whose representative is called the Apostolic Nuncio with the rank of an ambassador. Its offices are located in Lilongwe, the capital city. The title Apostolic Nuncio to Malawi is held by the prelate appointed Apostolic Nuncio to Zambia; he resides in Zambia.

The Holy See represented its interests in the region through its Delegation to East Africa until, with the decolonization of Africa in the mid-20th century, it established relationships with the new independent countries of that continent. Malawi, which under the name Nyasaland had been a protectorate of the United Kingdom, became an independent nation in 1964. The Holy See established its Nunciature to Malawi and named its chief on 21 May 1966.

== List of papal representatives to Malawi ==
Apostolic Pro-Nuncios

- Alfredo Poledrini (21 May 1966 – 24 December 1970)
- Luciano Angeloni (24 December 1970 – 25 November 1978)
- Giorgio Zur (5 February 1979 - 3 May 1985)
- Eugenio Sbarbaro (14 September 1985 - 7 February 1991)
- Giuseppe Leanza (4 June 1991 - 29 April 1999)

Apostolic Nuncios

- Orlando Antonini (24 July 1999 - 16 November 2005)
- Nicola Girasoli (24 January 2006 - 29 October 2011)
- Julio Murat (6 June 2012 - 24 March 2018)
- Gianfranco Gallone (8 May 2019 – 3 January 2023)
- Gian Luca Perici (5 June 2023 – present)
