= Villa Sant'Angelo =

- Comune
- Comune di Villa Sant'Angelo
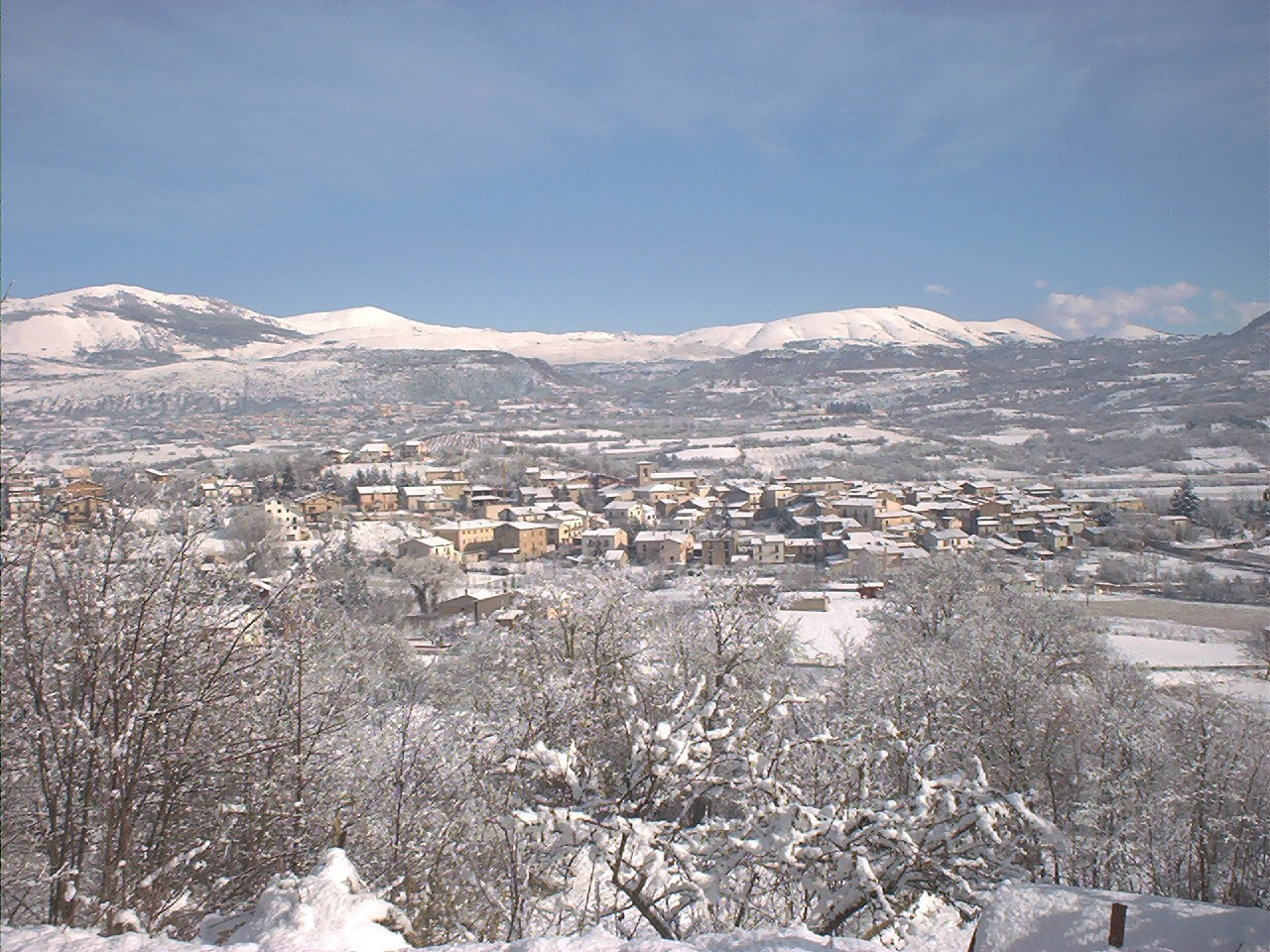

- Location within Italy Location within Abruzzo
- Coordinates: 42°16′N 13°32′E
- Country: Italy
- Region: Abruzzo
- Province: L'Aquila (AQ)
- Frazioni: Tussillo

Government
  - Mayor: Pierluigi Biondi

Area
  - Total: 5.26 km^{2} (2.03 sq mi)
- Elevation: 570 m (1,870 ft)

Population (2007)
  - Total: 436
  - Density: 82.9/km^{2} (215/sq mi)
- Demonym: Villesi
- Time zone: UTC+1 (CET)
  - Summer (DST): UTC+2 (CEST)
- Postal code: 67020
- Dialing code: 0862
- Patron saint: Saint Peter
- Saint day: May 4

Villa Sant'Angelo is a comune and town in the province of L'Aquila, in the Abruzzo region of Italy, which lies in the Aterno River valley near the convergence of the Sirente and the Gran Sasso mountain ranges. Many of the municipal functions are managed cooperatively with adjacent villages, comprising the Comunità Montana Amiternina.

The adjacent frazione of Tussillo sits just west of the village on the base of Saint Peter's Mountain

== History ==
Until recently, it was assumed that the origins of Villa Sant'Angelo dated back to the Middle Ages, however archaeological excavations have revealed the presence of buildings dating from Roman times. Ancient walls and portions of a necropolis (including tombs, terracotta and 4th Century bronze and silver coins) have been discovered in a series of digs conducted between 1986 and 2005.

In the early 20th century, numerous residents of Villa Sant'Angelo emigrated to the United States, beginning the decline of population from the peak of 1,027 recorded in the 1921 census. The communities of East Brady, Pennsylvania, and New Castle, Pennsylvania, in the United States absorbed many of these migrants.

At 3:32AM on the morning of April 6, 2009, a devastating earthquake hit central Italy, in particular Abruzzo. Approximately 90% of the buildings in Villa Sant'Angelo were destroyed and 17 people were killed.

== Notable residents ==
- Colombo Andreassi (1770–99), lawyer executed for supporting the creation of the Parthenopaean Republic.
- Nicolas Tomei, author

== Transport ==
Villa Sant'Angelo has a stop on the Terni–Sulmona railway, with trains to L'Aquila and Sulmona.
