= Gianfranco Gallone =

Italian prelate and diplomat

His Excellency, The Most Reverend Gianfranco Gallone
- Apostolic Nuncio to Uruguay; Titular Archbishop of Motula
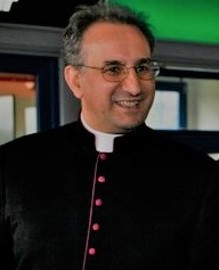
- Appointed: 3 January 2023
- Predecessor: Luciano Russo
- Other post: Titular Archbishop of Motula
- Previous post: Apostolic Nuncio to Zambia and Malawi (2019-2023)

Orders
- Ordination: 3 September 1988 by Armando Franco
- Consecration: 19 March 2019 by Pietro Cardinal Parolin

Personal details
- Born: April 20, 1963 (age 63) Ceglie Messapica, Italy
- Denomination: Roman Catholic
- Motto: Christi Crucem nuntio (I proclaim the Cross of Christ)
- Coat of arms

Styles of Gianfranco Gallone
- Reference style: His Excellency; The Most Reverend
- Spoken style: Your Excellency
- Religious style: Archbishop

Gianfranco Gallone (born April 20, 1963) is an Italian prelate of the Catholic Church and a diplomat of the Holy See.

== Biography ==
Gianfranco Gallone was born in Ceglie Messapica on 20 April 1963. He was ordained a priest for the Diocese of Oria on 3 September 1988.

After his ordination, he earned a degree in canon law and the licentiate in liturgy.

== Diplomatic career ==
On 19 June 2000, he joined the diplomatic service of the Holy See. He served in the Nunciatures in Mozambique, Israel, Slovakia, India and Sweden, and in the Relations Section of the Secretariat of State in Rome.

On 2 February 2019, Pope Francis appointed him Titular Archbishop of Motula and Apostolic Nuncio to Zambia. Cardinal Secretary of State Pietro Parolin consecrated him a bishop on 19 March 2019.

On 8 May 2019, he was appointed Apostolic Nuncio to Malawi as well.

On 3 January 2023, he was appointed as nuncio to Uruguay.

== See also ==
- List of heads of the diplomatic missions of the Holy See
