= Giuseppe Mazzoli =

Italian Roman Catholic priest

Giuseppe Mazzoli (22 November 1886 – 8 December 1945) was an Italian prelate of the Catholic Church, an archbishop who served briefly as Apostolic Delegate to Bulgaria in 1945.

He was born in Fabriano, Italy.

He was ordained a priest on 9 July 1911.

One of his early appointments in the diplomatic service of the Holy See was as auditor of the delegation to Egypt and Palestine.

Pope appointed him titular bishop of Germa in Hellesponto and Apostolic Delegate to Bulgaria on 15 December 1934. He received his episcopal consecration from Archbishop Gustavo Testa on 19 March 1935.

In Bulgaria he played a role in supporting the widespread opposition to the expulsion of Bulgaria's Jewish population as required by Nazi racial policy.

He died on 8 December 1945 at the age of 59 and was buried in Plovdiv. Government officials attended his burial as part of their attempt to win Vatican support for Bulgaria in the ongoing peace negotiations settling the claims of parties to the Second World War.
