= Luciano Suriani =

Italian prelate of the Catholic Church (born 1957)

His Excellency, The Most Reverend Luciano Suriani
- Apostolic Nuncio to Bulgaria and North Macedonia; Titular Archbishop of Amiternum
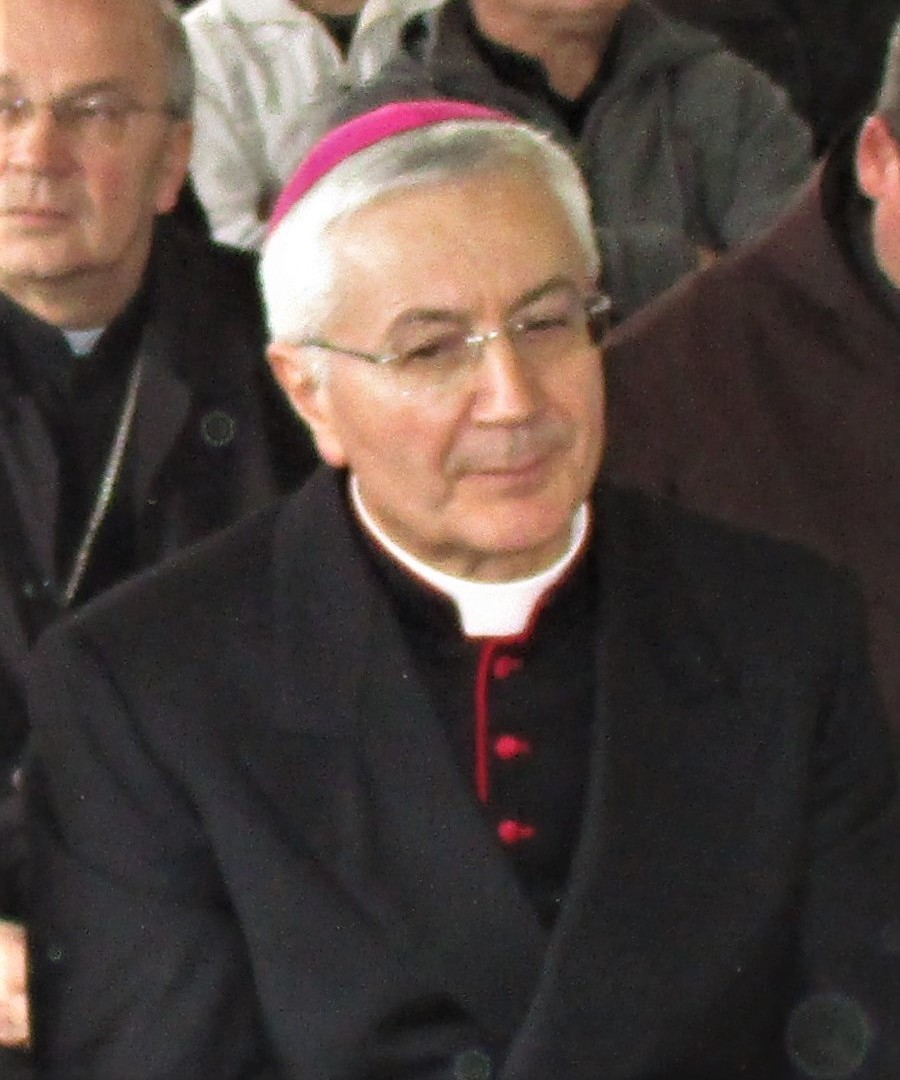
- Appointed: 13 May 2022
- Predecessor: Anselmo Guido Pecorari
- Other post: Titular Archbishop of Amiternum
- Previous posts: Apostolic Nuncio to Serbia (2015–2022); Secretariat of State (2009–2015); Apostolic Nuncio to Bolivia (2008)

Orders
- Ordination: 5 August 1981 by Vincenzo Fagiolo
- Consecration: 26 April 2008 by Tarcisio Pietro Evasio Bertone, Jean-Louis Tauran and Bruno Forte

Personal details
- Born: 11 January 1957 (age 69) Atessa, Italy
- Denomination: Roman Catholic
- Motto: QUOD VULT DEUS
- Coat of arms

Styles of Luciano Suriani
- Reference style: The Most Reverend
- Spoken style: Your Excellency
- Religious style: Archbishop

Luciano Suriani (born 11 January 1957) is an Italian prelate of the Catholic Church who has served as Apostolic Nuncio to Bulgaria from 2022.

== Biography ==
Suriani was born in 1957 in Atessa, Chieti. He was ordained a priest on 5 August 1981. He was incardinated in the diocese of Chieti-Vasto. He earned a doctorate in canon law from the Pontifical Ecclesiastical Academy.

== Diplomatic career ==
He entered the diplomatic service of the Holy See on 1 June 1990, and worked in the papal diplomatic missions to Ivory Coast, Switzerland, the Section for Relations with States at the Secretariat of State, and the Nunciature to Italy, by which time he held the rank of counsellor.

Apart from Italian, he knows Spanish, French and English.

On 22 February 2008 by Pope Benedict XVI appointed him Apostolic Nuncio to Bolivia and titular archbishop of Amiternum, On 26 April 2008 he was ordained a bishop by Tarcisio Cardinal Bertone.

He was replaced as Nuncio to Bolivia after nine months on 22 September by Giambattista Diquattro. Suriani had requested a new assignment because of health problems associated with high altitudes. La Paz is located 3,640 metres above sea level.

On 24 September 2009, Suriani was appointed to a senior position as the Secretariat of State. As Delegate for Papal Representatives he has responsibility for coordinating the affairs of the Holy See's diplomats.

On 7 December 2015 Pope Francis appointed him nuncio to Serbia.

On 13 May 2022 Pope Francis appointed him nuncio to Bulgaria and North Macedonia.

== See also ==
- List of heads of the diplomatic missions of the Holy See

Catholic Church titles
Preceded by Ivo Scapolo	Apostolic Nuncio to Bolivia; 22 February 2008 – 21 November 2008	Succeeded by Giambattista Diquattro
Preceded by Carlo Maria Viganò	Delegate to the Pontifical Representations; 24 September 2009 – 7 December 2015	Succeeded by Jan Pawłowski
