= List of heads of the diplomatic missions of the Holy See =

Diplomatic relations, resident mission, nuncio is of ambassadorial rank and with additional privilege. Diplomatic relations, non-resident accreditation with additional privileges Diplomatic relations, resident mission, nuncio has normal ambassadorial status Diplomatic relations, non-resident accreditation, normal ambassadorial status Formal contact with the government, but no diplomatic relations Representative to the Catholic communities only, no diplomatic relations

The following is a sortable list of the heads of the diplomatic mission of the Holy See. An apostolic nuncio (also known as a papal nuncio or simply as a nuncio) is an ecclesiastical diplomat, serving as an envoy or a permanent diplomatic representative of the Holy See to a state or to an international organization. A nuncio is appointed by and represents the Holy See, and is the head of the diplomatic mission, called an Apostolic Nunciature, which is the equivalent of an embassy. The Holy See is legally distinct from the Vatican City or the Catholic Church. A nuncio is usually an archbishop.

== Diplomatic Posts ==
Country	Type of mission	Representative	Nomination / vacancy date	Ref.
African Union	Representative (seated in Ethiopia)	Udaigwe, Brian	3 November 2025	
Albania	Nunciature	Adamczyk, Mirosław	14 January 2026	
Algeria	Nunciature	Herrera Corona, Javier	22 November 2025	
Andorra	Nunciature (non-residential)	Pioppo, Piero	15 September 2025	
Angola	Nunciature	Dubiel, Kryspin Witold	1 July 2024	
Antigua and Barbuda	Nunciature (non-residential)	vacant	25 May 2026	
Antilles	Delegation (seated in Trinidad and Tobago)	vacant	25 May 2026	
Arab League	Delegation (seated in Egypt)	Thévenin, Nicolas	4 November 2019	
Arabian Peninsula	Delegation (seated in United Arab Emirates)	vacant	25 July 2026	
Argentina	Nunciature	Banach, Michael	14 May 2026	
Armenia	Nunciature (non-residential)	Jozić, Ante	28 June 2024	
ASEAN	Nunciature	Erbi, Walter	1 July 2026	
Australia	Nunciature	vacant	30 June 2026	
Austria	Nunciature	López Quintana, Pedro	4 March 2019	
Azerbaijan	Nunciature (non-residential)	Solczyński, Marek	14 February 2022	
Bahamas	Nunciature (non-residential)	vacant	25 May 2026	
Bahrain	Nunciature (non-residential)	vacant	25 May 2026	
Bangladesh	Nunciature	Randall, Kevin Stuart	13 August 2023	
Barbados	Nunciature (non-residential)	vacant	25 May 2026	
Belarus	Nunciature	Ceffalia, Ignazio	25 March 2025	
Belgium	Nunciature	vacant	5 November 2026	
Belize	Nunciature (non-residential)	vacant	25 May 2026	
Benin	Nunciature	Ruiz Mainardi, Rubén Darío	28 October 2024	
Bolivia	Nunciature	Sosa Rodríguez, Fermín Emilio	17 November 2023	
Bosnia and Herzegovina	Nunciature	Chullikatt, Francis	1 October 2022	
Botswana	Nunciature (non-residential)	Jagodziński, Henryk	20 August 2024	
Brazil	Nunciature	Diquattro, Giambattista	29 August 2020	
Brunei Darussalam	Delegation (seated in Malaysia)	vacant	28 February 2026	
Bulgaria	Nunciature	Suriani, Luciano	13 May 2022	
Burkina Faso	Nunciature	Soviguidi, Eric	15 August 2025	
Burundi	Nunciature	Datonou, Dieudonné	7 October 2021	
Cabo Verde	Nunciature (non-residential)	vacant	14 November 2026	
Cambodia	Nunciature (non-residential)	Wells, Peter Bryan	8 February 2023	
Cameroon	Nunciature	Bettencourt, José Avelino	30 August 2023	
Canada	Nunciature	Jurkovič, Ivan	5 June 2021	
Central African Republic	Nunciature	Laterza, Giuseppe	5 January 2023	
Chad	Nunciature (non-residential)	Laterza, Giuseppe	5 January 2023	
Chile	Nunciature	Vayalunkal, Kurian Mathew	15 March 2025	
China, Republic of (Note: The Holy See withdrew its Apostolic Internuncio, Edward Cassidy on 25 October 1971. Francesco Colasuonno soon replaced him as the first in a series of chargés d’affaires.)	Nunciature	vacant	25 October 1971	
Colombia	Nunciature	Accattino, Angelo	15 August 2026	
Comoros	Delegation (seated in Madagascar)	vacant	14 May 2026	
Congo, Democratic Republic of	Nunciature	Leskovar, Mitja	16 April 2024	
Congo, Republic of	Nunciature	Ouédraogo, Relwendé Kisito	28 January 2026	
Cook Islands	Nunciature (non-residential)	Pintér, Gábor	12 April 2025	
Costa Rica	Nunciature	Miles, Mark	9 July 2024	
Côte d'Ivoire	Nunciature	Rueda Beltz, Mauricio	16 June 2023	
Council of Europe	Permanent observer	Butnaru, Paul	24 September 2026	
Croatia	Nunciature	Girelli, Leopoldo	13 March 2026	
Cuba	Nunciature	Camilleri, Antoine	20 May 2024	
Cyprus	Nunciature (non-residential)	Dal Toso, Giovanni Pietro	17 February 2023	
Czech Republic	Nunciature	Nugent, Eugene	25 May 2026	
Denmark	Nunciature (non-residential)	Murat, Julio	25 January 2023	
Djibouti	Nunciature (non-residential)	Udaigwe, Brian	3 November 2025	
Dominica	Nunciature (non-residential)	vacant	25 May 2026	
Dominican Republic	Nunciature	Bertoldi, Piergiorgio	18 May 2023	
ECOWAS	Permanent observer	vacant	8 August 2023	
Ecuador	Nunciature	Campos Salas, Dagoberto	1 May 2026	
Egypt	Nunciature	Thévenin, Nicolas	4 November 2019	
El Salvador	Nunciature	Dellagiovanna, Giancarlo	25 April 2026	
Equatorial Guinea	Nunciature (non-residential)	Bettencourt, José Avelino	30 August 2023	
Eritrea	Nunciature (non-residential)	vacant	23 January 2024	
Estonia	Nunciature (non-residential)	Gänswein, Georg	24 June 2024	
Eswatini	Nunciature (non-residential)	Jagodziński, Henryk	19 July 2024	
Ethiopia	Nunciature	Udaigwe, Brian	12 April 2025	
European Union	Nunciature	Auza, Bernardito	22 March 2025	
Fiji	Nunciature (non-residential)	Pintér, Gábor	29 August 2024	
Finland	Nunciature (non-residential)	Murat, Julio	7 March 2023	
France	Nunciature	Migliore, Celestino	11 January 2020	
Gabon	Nunciature	Ouédraogo, Relwendé Kisito	10 February 2026	
Gambia	Nunciature (non-residential)	vacant	1 July 2026	
Georgia	Nunciature	Jozić, Ante	28 June 2024	
Germany	Nunciature	van Megen, Hubertus	9 April 2026	
Ghana	Nunciature	Kaboré, Julien	29 June 2024	
Great Britain (Note: Even though other diplomatic missions are appointed to the United Kingdom, that of Holy See is appointed to Great Britain.)	Nunciature	Maury Buendía, Miguel	13 April 2023	
Greece	Nunciature	vacant	7 October 2026	
Grenada	Nunciature (non-residential)	vacant	25 May 2026	
Guatemala	Nunciature	Padilla, Francisco Montecillo	17 April 2020	
Guinea	Nunciature	Mambé, Jean-Sylvain Emien	12 November 2022	
Guinea-Bissau	Nunciature (non-residential)	vacant	14 November 2026	
Guyana	Nunciature (non-residential)	vacant	25 May 2026	
Haiti	Nunciature	Okolo, Jude Thaddeus	11 February 2026	
Honduras	Nunciature	Sánchez Carrión, Simón Bolívar	15 October 2024	
Hungary	Nunciature	Coppola, Franco	5 November 2026	
Iceland	Nunciature (non-residential)	Murat, Julio	9 November 2022	
India	Nunciature	Sommertag, Waldemar Stanisław	14 November 2026	
Indonesia	Nunciature	Erbi, Walter	1 July 2026	
Iran	Nunciature	vacant	31 January 2026	
Iraq	Nunciature	Wachowski, Mirosław Stanisław	18 September 2025	
Ireland	Nunciature	Pawłowski, Jan Romeo	7 October 2026	
Israel	Nunciature	Lingua, Giorgio	22 January 2026	
Italy	Nunciature	Peña Parra, Edgar	30 March 2026	
Jamaica	Nunciature (non-residential)	vacant	25 May 2026	
Japan	Nunciature	Escalante Molina, Francisco	25 January 2024	
Jerusalem and Palestine	Delegation (seated in Israel)	Lingua, Giorgio	22 January 2026	
Jordan	Nunciature	Dal Toso, Giovanni Pietro	21 January 2023	
Kazakhstan	Nunciature	Panamthundil, George George	16 June 2023	
Kenya	Nunciature	vacant	9 April 2026	
Kiribati	Nunciature (non-residential)	Pintér, Gábor	12 April 2025	
Korea, Republic of	Nunciature	Gaspari, Giovanni	2 March 2024	
Kosovo	Delegation (seated in Slovenia)	Bianco, Luigi	20 May 2025	
Kuwait	Nunciature	vacant	25 May 2026	
Kyrgyzstan	Nunciature (non-residential)	Panamthundil, George George	15 July 2023	
Laos	Delegation (seated in Thailand)	Wells, Peter Bryan	8 February 2023	
Latvia	Nunciature (non-residential)	Gänswein, Georg	24 June 2024	
Lebanon	Nunciature	Borgia, Paoli	24 September 2022	
Lesotho	Nunciature (non-residential)	Jagodziński, Henryk	16 April 2024	
Liberia	Nunciature	Fernández González, Javier Domingo	21 November 2026	
Libya	Nunciature (non-residential)	Załuski, Wojciech	25 April 2026	
Liechtenstein	Nunciature (non-residential)	Krebs, Martin	3 March 2021	
Lithuania	Nunciature	Gänswein, Georg	24 June 2024	
Luxembourg	Nunciature (non-residential)	vacant	5 November 2026	
Madagascar	Nunciature	vacant	14 May 2026	
Malawi	Nunciature (non-residential)	Perici, Gian Luca	5 June 2023	
Malaysia	Nunciature	vacant	28 February 2026	
Mali	Nunciature (non-residential)	Mambé, Jean-Sylvain Emien	2 February 2022	
Malta	Nunciature	Załuski, Wojciech	28 February 2026	
Marshall Islands	Nunciature (non-residential)	Pintér, Gábor	12 April 2025	
Mauritania	Nunciature (non-residential)	vacant	14 November 2026	
Mauritius	Nunciature (non-residential)	vacant	14 May 2026	
Mexico	Nunciature	Spiteri, Joseph	7 July 2022	
Micronesia, Federated States of	Nunciature (non-residential)	Pintér, Gábor	14 January 2025	
Moldova	Nunciature (non-residential)	Gloder, Giampiero	23 February 2024	
Monaco	Nunciature (non-residential)	Krebs, Martin	19 April 2024	
Mongolia	Nunciature (non-residential)	Gaspari, Giovanni	2 March 2024	
Montenegro	Nunciature (non-residential)	Chullikatt, Francis	1 October 2022	
Morocco	Nunciature	Xuereb, Alfred	8 December 2023	
Mozambique	Nunciature	Muñoz Cárdaba, Luís Miguel	23 January 2024	
Myanmar	Nunciature (non-residential)	vacant	16 July 2022	
Namibia	Nunciature (non-residential)	Jagodziński, Henryk	19 July 2024	
Nauru	Nunciature (non-residential)	Pintér, Gábor	12 April 2025	
Nepal	Nunciature (non-residential)	vacant	13 March 2026	
Netherlands	Nunciature	de Wit Guzmán, Santiago	25 May 2026	
New Zealand	Nunciature	Pintér, Gábor	27 July 2024	
Nicaragua	Nunciature	vacant	6 March 2022	
Niger	Nunciature (non-residential)	Soviguidi, Eric	12 September 2025	
Nigeria	Nunciature	Crotty, Michael Francis	16 July 2024	
North Macedonia	Nunciature (non-residential)	Suriani, Luciano	21 May 2022	
Norway	Nunciature (non-residential)	Murat, Julio	16 March 2023	
Oman	Nunciature (non-residential)	Thévenin, Nicolas	22 May 2023	
Organization of American States	Permanent observer	Cruz Serrano, Juan Antonio	5 February 2021	
OSCE	Permanent Representative	Gyhra, Richard Allen	1 August 2024	
Pacific Ocean	Delegation (seated in New Zealand)	Pintér, Gábor	18 June 2025	
Pakistan	Nunciature	Penemote, Germano	16 June 2023	
Palau	Nunciature (non-residential)	Pintér, Gábor	14 January 2025	
Panama	Nunciature	vacant	1 May 2026	
Papua New Guinea	Nunciature	Bravi, Maurizio	15 January 2025	
Paraguay	Nunciature	Turturro, Vincenzo	29 December 2023	
Peru	Nunciature	Gualtieri, Paolo Rocco	6 August 2022	
Philippines	Nunciature	Brown, Charles John	28 September 2020	
Poland	Nunciature	Filipazzi, Antonio	8 August 2023	
Portugal	Nunciature	Carrascosa Coso, Andrés	11 December 2025	
Puerto Rico	Delegation (seated in Dominican Republic)	Bertoldi, Piergiorgio	18 May 2023	
Qatar	Nunciature (non-residential)	vacant	25 May 2026	
Romania	Nunciature	Gloder, Giampiero	23 February 2024	
Russian Federation	Nunciature	d'Aniello, Giovanni	1 June 2020	
Rwanda	Nunciature	Catalan, Arnaldo	31 January 2022	
Saint Kitts and Nevis	Nunciature (non-residential)	vacant	25 May 2026	
Saint Lucia	Nunciature (non-residential)	vacant	25 May 2026	
Saint Vincent and the Grenadines	Nunciature (non-residential)	vacant	25 May 2026	
Samoa	Nunciature (non-residential)	Pintér, Gábor	12 April 2025	
San Marino	Nunciature (non-residential)	Peña Parra, Edgar	30 March 2026	
São Tomé and Príncipe	Nunciature (non-residential)	Dubiel, Kryspin Witold	15 July 2024	
Senegal	Nunciature	vacant	14 November 2026	
Serbia	Nunciature	Gangemi, Santo Rocco	12 September 2022	
Seychelles	Nunciature (non-residential)	vacant	14 May 2026	
Sierra Leone	Nunciature (non-residential)	Fernández González, Javier Domingo	21 November 2026	
Singapore	Nunciature	Zalewski, Marek	21 May 2018	
Slovakia	Nunciature	Girasoli, Nicola	2 July 2022	
Slovenia	Nunciature	Bianco, Luigi	20 May 2025	
Solomon Islands	Nunciature (non-residential)	Bravi, Maurizio	15 January 2025	
Somalia	Delegation (seated in Ethiopia)	Udaigwe, Brian	3 November 2025	
South Africa	Nunciature	Jagodziński, Henryk	16 April 2024	
South Sudan	Nunciature	Horgan, Séamus Patrick	14 May 2024	
Spain	Nunciature	Pioppo, Piero	15 September 2025	
Sri Lanka	Nunciature	Józwowicz, Andrzej	31 January 2026	
Sudan	Nunciature	vacant	23 January 2024	
Suriname	Nunciature (non-residential)	vacant	25 May 2026	
Sweden	Nunciature	Murat, Julio	9 November 2022	
Switzerland	Nunciature	Krebs, Martin	3 March 2021	
Syria	Nunciature	Cona, Luigi Roberto	19 March 2026	
Tajikistan	Nunciature (non-residential)	Panamthundil, George George	15 July 2023	
Tanzania	Nunciature	vacant	15 August 2026	
Thailand	Nunciature	Wells, Peter Bryan	8 February 2023	
Timor-Leste	Nunciature (non-residential)	vacant	28 February 2026	
Togo	Nunciature (non-residential)	Ruiz Mainardi Rubén Darío	28 October 2024	
Tonga	Nunciature (non-residential)	Pintér, Gábor	15 August 2026	
Trinidad and Tobago	Nunciature	vacant	25 May 2026	
Tunisia	Nunciature (non-residential)	Herrera Corona, Javier	16 February 2026	
Turkey	Nunciature	Solczyński, Marek	2 February 2022	
Turkmenistan	Nunciature (non-residential)	Solczyński, Marek	8 September 2022	
Uganda	Nunciature	Grysa, Tomasz	14 May 2026	
Ukraine	Nunciature	Kulbokas, Visvaldas	15 June 2021	
United Arab Emirates	Nunciature	Bielaszka, Grzegorz Piotr	5 October 2026	
United Nations	Permanent observer	El-Kassis, Christophe Zakhia	25 July 2026	
United Nations FAO (Note: In addition to the FAO, this position includes the International Fund for Agricultural Development (IFAD) and the World Food Programme (WFP or, based on its name in French or Italian, PAM).)	Permanent observer	Chica Arellano, Fernando	12 February 2015	
United Nations in Geneva (Note: This appointment includes that of Permanent Observer to the World Trade Organization and to the International Organization for Migration.)	Permanent observer	Balestrero, Ettore	21 June 2023	
United Nations in Nairobi (Note: The two UN agencies in Nairobi are UNEP and UN-Habitat.)	Permanent observer	vacant	9 April 2026	
United Nations in Vienna (Note: Permanent Representative of the Holy See to the International Atomic Energy Agency (IAEA), the Organization for Security and Cooperation in Europe (OSCE), and the Preparatory Commission for the Comprehensive Nuclear-Test-Ban Treaty Organization (CTBTO); Permanent Observer of the Holy See at the United Nations Industrial Development Organization (ONUDI) and the United Nations Office in Vienna.)	Permanent representative or observer	Gyhra, Richard Allen	1 July 2024	
United Nations UNESCO	Permanent observer	Campisi, Roberto	27 September 2025	
United Nations UNWTO	Permanent observer	Mendez, Jain	1 September 2025	
United States	Nunciature	Caccia, Gabriele Giordano	7 March 2026	
Uruguay	Nunciature	Gallone, Gianfranco	3 January 2023	
Uzbekistan	Nunciature (non-residential)	d'Aniello, Giovanni	14 January 2021	
Vanuatu	Nunciature (non-residential)	Pintér, Gábor	14 January 2025	
Venezuela	Nunciature	Ortega Martín, Alberto	14 May 2024	
Vietnam	Residential pontifical representative	Zalewski, Marek	21 May 2018	
Yemen	Nunciature (non-residential)	vacant	25 July 2026	
Zambia	Nunciature	Perici, Gian Luca	5 June 2023	
Zimbabwe	Nunciature	Urbańczyk, Janusz	25 January 2024	

== Apostolic Nuncio emeriti ==
Nationality	Archbishop	Last Post(s)
Italy	Acerbi, Angelo	Apostolic Nuncio Emeritus to the Netherlands
United States	Adams, Edward Joseph	Apostolic Nuncio Emeritus to Great Britain
Italy	Antonini, Orlando	Apostolic Nuncio Emeritus to Serbia
Italy	Ariotti, Eliseo Antonio	Apostolic Nuncio Emeritus to Paraguay
Jordan	Bader, Ghaleb Moussa Abdalla	Apostolic Nuncio Emeritus to Dominican Republic; Apostolic Delegate Emeritus to Puerto Rico
United States	Balvo, Charles Daniel	Apostolic Nuncio Emeritus to Australia
Italy	Berloco, Giacinto	Apostolic Nuncio Emeritus to Belgium and Luxembourg
United States	Blume, Michael August	Apostolic Nuncio Emeritus to Hungary
Italy	Boccardi, Leo	Apostolic Nuncio Emeritus to Japan
Italy	Bottari de Castello, Alberto	Apostolic Nuncio Emeritus to Hungary
Italy	Canalini, Francesco	Apostolic Nuncio Emeritus to Switzerland and Liechtenstein
Italy	Causero, Diego	Apostolic Nuncio Emeritus to Switzerland and Liechtenstein
India	Collaço, Blasco Francisco	Apostolic Nuncio Emeritus to South Africa, Botswana, Lesotho, Namibia and Eswatini
Italy	D'Errico, Alessandro	Apostolic Nuncio Emeritus to Libya and Malta
France	Dupuy, André Pierre Louis	Apostolic Nuncio Emeritus to the Netherlands
Croatia	Eterović, Nikola	Apostolic Nuncio Emeritus to Germany
United Kingdom	Fitzgerald, Michael Louis	Apostolic Nuncio Emeritus to Egypt
Italy	Franco, Antonio	Apostolic Nuncio Emeritus to Israel and Cyprus; Apostolic Delegate Emeritus to Jerusalem and Palestine
Italy	Fratini, Renzo	Apostolic Nuncio Emeritus to Spain and Andorra
Italy	Gatti, Luigi	Apostolic Nuncio Emeritus to Greece
Italy	Giordana, Mario	Apostolic Nuncio Emeritus to Slovakia
France	Gobel, Jean-Paul Aimé	Apostolic Nuncio Emeritus to Egypt; Apostolic Delegate Emeritus to the Arab League
United States	Green, James Patrick	Apostolic Nuncio Emeritus to Sweden, Denmark, Finland, Iceland and Norway
United States	Gullickson, Thomas Edward	Apostolic Nuncio Emeritus to Switzerland and Liechtenstein
Hong Kong	Hon Tai-Fai, Savio	Apostolic Nuncio Emeritus to Malta and Libya
Poland	Janusz, Juliusz	Apostolic Nuncio Emeritus to Slovenia; Apostolic Delegate Emeritus to Kosovo
Uganda	Kasujja, Augustine	Apostolic Nuncio Emeritus to Belgium and Luxembourg
India	Kocherry, George	Apostolic Nuncio Emeritus to Bangladesh
Italy	Lazzarotto, Giuseppe	Apostolic Nuncio Emeritus to Israel and Cyprus; Apostolic Delegate Emeritus to Jerusalem and Palestine
Italy	Leanza, Giuseppe	Apostolic Nuncio Emeritus to Czech Republic
Spain	Lozano Sebastián, Francisco-Javier	Apostolic Nuncio Emeritus to Romania and Moldova
Italy	Lucibello, Antonio	Apostolic Nuncio Emeritus to Turkey and Turkmenistan
United States	Marino, Joseph	President emeritus of Pontifical Ecclesiastical Academy
Spain	Moliner Inglés, Ramiro	Apostolic Nuncio Emeritus to Albania
Argentina	Montemayor, Luis Mariano	Apostolic Nuncio Emeritus to Ireland
Italy	Musarò, Bruno	Apostolic Nuncio Emeritus to Costa Rica
Vietnam	Nguyễn Văn Tốt, Pierre	Apostolic Nuncio Emeritus to Sri Lanka
Poland	Nowacki, Henryk Józef	Apostolic Nuncio Emeritus to Sweden, Denmark, Finland, Iceland and Norway
Italy	Ottonello, Giacomo Guido	Apostolic Nuncio Emeritus to Slovakia
Philippines	Padilla, Osvaldo	Apostolic Nuncio Emeritus to South Korea and Mongolia
India	Panikulam, George	Apostolic Nuncio Emeritus to Uruguay
Italy	Passigato, Rino	Apostolic Nuncio Emeritus to Portugal
Italy	Pecorari, Anselmo Guido	Apostolic Nuncio Emeritus to Bulgaria and North Macedonia
Switzerland	Périsset, Jean-Claude	Apostolic Nuncio Emeritus to Germany
Italy	Pezzuto, Luigi	Apostolic Nuncio Emeritus to Bosnia and Herzegovina and Montenegro
France	Pierre, Christophe	Apostolic Nuncio Emeritus to the United States
Italy	Pinto, Giuseppe	Apostolic Nuncio Emeritus to Croatia
Italy	Rallo, Vito	Apostolic Nuncio Emeritus to Morocco
Italy	Rapisarda, Alfio	Apostolic Nuncio Emeritus to Portugal
Italy	Rovida, Edoardo	Apostolic Nuncio Emeritus to Portugal
Italy	Sbarbaro, Eugenio	Apostolic Nuncio Emeritus to Serbia
Italy	Scapolo, Ivo	Apostolic Nuncio Emeritus to Portugal
Italy	Sozzo, Antonio	Apostolic Nuncio Emeritus to Morocco
France	Speich, Jean-Marie	Apostolic Nuncio Emeritus to the Netherlands
Italy	Tomasi, Silvano Maria	Permanent Observer of the Holy See to the United Nations in Geneva
Italy	Travaglino, Luigi	Apostolic Nuncio Emeritus to Monaco
Italy	Tricarico, Alberto	Official of the Office of Secretariat of State
Korea, Republic of	Tschang In-Nam, Paul	Apostolic Nuncio Emeritus to the Netherlands
Switzerland	Tscherrig, Emil Paul	Apostolic Nuncio Emeritus to Italy and San Marino
Italy	Ventura, Luigi	Apostolic Nuncio Emeritus to France
Croatia	Vidović, Martin	Apostolic Nuncio Emeritus to Belarus
Italy	Viganò, Carlo Maria	Apostolic Nuncio Emeritus to United States
China, Republic of	Yeh Sheng-nan, Thomas	Apostolic Nuncio Emeritus to Algeria and Tunisia
Philippines	Yllana, Adolfo Tito	Apostolic Nuncio Emeritus to Israel; Apostolic Delegate Emeritus to Jerusalem and Palestine
Italy	Zenari, Mario	Apostolic Nuncio Emeritus to Syria
