= George Kocherry =

Indian prelate of the Catholic Church (born 1945)

Mar George Kocherry
- Apostolic Nuncio Emeritus to Bangladesh; Titular Archbishop of Othona
- Church: Syro-Malabar
- Installed: 6 July 2013
- Retired: 24 August 2022
- Predecessor: Joseph Marino
- Other post: Titular Archbishop of Othona
- Previous posts: Apostolic Nuncio to Bangladesh (2013-2022); Apostolic Nuncio to Zimbabwe (2007-2013); Apostolic Nuncio to Ghana (2000-2007); Apostolic Nuncio to Togo (2000-2002)

Orders
- Ordination: 26 June 1974
- Consecration: 21 August 2000 by Joseph Powathil

Personal details
- Born: 4 February 1945 (age 81) Changanacherry, India
- Denomination: Catholic
- Education: Pontifical Ecclesiastical Academy

Styles of George Kocherry
- Reference style: His Excellency; The Most Reverend
- Spoken style: Your Excellency
- Religious style: Archbishop

George Kocherry (born 4 February 1945) is an Indian prelate of the Syro-Malabar Church who joined the diplomatic service of the Holy See in 1978 and became an archbishop and nuncio in 2000. After serving as apostolic nuncio to Togo, Ghana, and Zimbabwe, he was the nuncio to Bangladesh from 2013 to 2022.

== Biography ==
George Kocherry was born in Changanacherry, Kerala, on 4 February 1945, the eldest of fourteen children.

He completed his pre-degree from SB College Changanasserry. He left India in 1967 to study philosophy and theology in Rome, where he obtained his doctorate in canon law. He was ordained a priest of the Archeparchy of Changanacherry on 26 June 1974.

== Diplomatic career ==
To prepare for the diplomatic service, he completed the course of study at the Pontifical Ecclesiastical Academy in 1974.

He entered the diplomatic service of the Holy See on 1 May 1978. He served in the nunciatures in South Korea, Costa Rica, Nigeria, Trinidad and Tobago, Thailand, Singapore, Switzerland and Australia.

On 10 June 2000, Pope John Paul II appointed him Apostolic Nuncio to Ghana and Togo and Titular Archbishop of Othona. He received his episcopal consecration from Archbishop Joseph Powathil on 21 August. As a rare nuncio not raised in the Roman rite, he said: "By my appointment, the Vatican has declared its love and consideration for the Syro-Malabar archdiocese."

He was replaced as nuncio to Togo in November 2002, when Pierre Nguyên Van Tot received that title, along with that of nuncio to Benin.

On 22 December 2007, Pope Benedict XVI named him Apostolic Nuncio to Zimbabwe.

On 6 July 2013, Pope Francis appointed him Apostolic Nuncio to Bangladesh. He held that position when Pope Francis visited Bangladesh in November 2017 and he coordinated later efforts to support Rohingya refugees.

Pope Francis accepted his resignation from his Bangladesh assignment on 24 August 2022.

== See also ==
- List of heads of the diplomatic missions of the Holy See

Catholic Church titles
Preceded by Vincent Nichols	Titular Archbishop of Othona; 2000 – Present	Incumbent
Preceded by André Dupuy	Apostolic Nuncio to Togo; 2000–2002	Succeeded by Pierre Nguyên Van Tot
Preceded by André Dupuy	Apostolic Nuncio to Ghana; 2000–2007	Succeeded by Léon Kalenga Badikebele
Preceded by Edward Joseph Adams	Apostolic Nuncio to Zimbabwe; 2007 – 2013	Succeeded by Marek Zalewski
Preceded by Joseph Marino	Apostolic Nuncio to Bangladesh; 2013 – 2022	Vacant
