= Giacinto Berloco =

Italian prelate of the Catholic Church

His Excellency, The Most Reverend Giacinto Berloco
- Apostolic Nuncio emeritus of Belgium and Luxembourg; Titular Archbishop of Fidenae
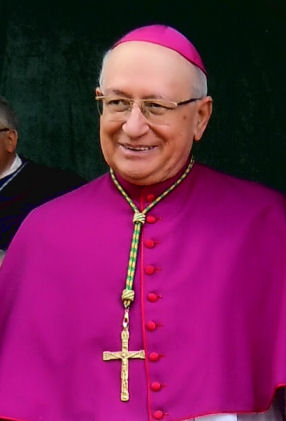
- Appointed: 18 June 2009
- Retired: September 2016
- Predecessor: Karl-Josef Rauber
- Successor: Augustine Kasujja
- Other post: Titular Archbishop of Fidenae
- Previous posts: Apostolic Nuncio to Venezuela (2005–2009); Apostolic Nuncio to El Salvador and Belize (1998–2005); Apostolic Nuncio to Costa Rica (1993–1998); Apostolic Nuncio to Zimbabwe and Mozanmbique (1990–1993)

Orders
- Ordination: 19 March 1966
- Consecration: 5 April 1990 by Pope John Paul II, Giovanni Battista Re and Justin Rigali

Personal details
- Born: Giacinto Berloco; 31 August 1941 (age 85) Altamura, Italy
- Denomination: Roman Catholic

Styles of Giacinto Berloco
- Reference style: His Excellency; The Most Reverend
- Spoken style: Your Excellency
- Religious style: Archbishop

Giacinto Berloco (born 31 August 1941) is an Italian prelate of the Catholic Church. He served as the Apostolic Nuncio to Belgium and to Luxembourg from 2009 to 2016.

== Biography ==
Born in Altamura, Italy, on 31 August 1941, Giacinto Berloco was ordained to the priesthood on 19 March 1966 for the Roman Catholic Diocese of Altamura-Gravina-Acquaviva delle Fonti. Berloco obtained a Doctor of Theology degree and a licentiate in canon law.

== Diplomatic career ==
Berloco entered the diplomatic service of the Holy See in 1972 and served in the nunciatures in Costa Rica, the Netherlands and Spain, and then in the Vatican Secretariat of State. On 5 September 1974 Pope Paul VI gave him the honorary title of Chaplain of His Holiness and on 24 June 1985 Pope John Paul II gave him the title of Honorary Prelate of His Holiness.

On 15 March 1990, Pope John Paul II appointed him Titular Archbishop of Fidenae and Apostolic Delegate to Mozambique. On 3 April he received the additional responsibility of Apostolic Pro-Nuncio to Zimbabwe.

He was consecrated bishop on 5 April 1990 by Pope John Paul, with co-consecrators Giovanni Battista Re and Justin Francis Rigali.

On 17 July 1993, Berloco was appointed Apostolic Nuncio to Costa Rica.

On 5 May 1998, Pope John Paul appointed him Apostolic Nuncio to El Salvador and Belize.

On 24 February 2005, Berloco was appointed Apostolic Nuncio in Venezuela.

On 18 June 2009 Pope Benedict XVI appointed him Nuncio in Belgium. On 24 July 2009 he was appointed Nuncio in Luxembourg as well.

On 8 March 2017, Pope Francis appointed Berloco to a five-year term as a member of the Congregation for Bishops.

== See also ==
- List of heads of the diplomatic missions of the Holy See

Diplomatic posts
Preceded by Patrick Coveney	Nuncio to Zimbabwe; 1990–1993	Succeeded by Peter Paul Prabhu
Preceded by Francesco Colasuonno	Nuncio to Mozambique; 1990–1993	Succeeded by Peter Stephan Zurbriggen
Preceded by Pier Giacomo De Nicolò	Nuncio to Costa Rica; 1993–1998	Succeeded by Antonio Sozzo
Preceded by Manuel Monteiro de Castro	Nuncio to El Salvador; 1998–2005	Succeeded by Luigi Pezzuto
Preceded by Manuel Monteiro de Castro	Nuncio to Belize and the Antilles; 1998–2005	Succeeded by Luigi Pezzuto
Preceded by André Dupuy	Apostolic Nuncio to Venezuela; 2005–2009	Succeeded by Pietro Parolin
Preceded by Karl-Josef Rauber	Apostolic Nuncio to Belgium; 18 June 2009 – 22 September 2016	Succeeded by Augustine Kasujja
Preceded by Karl-Josef Rauber	Nuncio to Luxembourg; 24 July 2009 – 22 September 2016	Succeeded by Augustine Kasujja
