= Fernando Chica Arellano =

Spanish Catholic priest and diplomat

Monsignor Fernando Chica Arellano
- Permanent Observer to the Food and Agricultural Organization of the United Nations
- Church: Roman Catholic Church
- Appointed: 12 February 2015
- Predecessor: Luigi Travaglino

Orders
- Ordination: 19 April 1987 by Miguel Peinado Peinado

Personal details
- Born: Fernando Chica Arellano; 24 June 1963 (age 63) Mengíbar, Jaén, Spain
- Education: Pontifical Ecclesiastical Academy

Fernando Chica Arellano (born 24 June 1963) is a Spanish priest of the Catholic Church who has worked in the diplomatic service of the Holy See since 2002. He has been the Permanent Observer of the Holy See to the Food and Agriculture Organization of the United Nations (FAO) since 2015.

== Biography ==
Fernando Chica Arellano was born in Mengíbar, Jaén, Spain, on 24 June 1963. He earned a doctorate in dogmatic theology and was ordained a priest of the Diocese of Jaén on 19 April 1987. He then fulfilled pastoral assignments in various parishes while serving as director of the Cardenal Merino residence at the diocesan seminary.

== Diplomatic career ==
In preparation for a career in the diplomatic service, he completed the course of study at the Pontifical Ecclesiastical Academy in 2000. He entered the diplomatic service of the Holy See on 1 July 2002. His first assignment was as secretary to the Apostolic Nuncio to Colombia. He then worked in the office of the Permanent Observer of the Holy See to the United Nations in Geneva, and then in Rome in the Section for General Affairs of the Secretariat of State, where he became head of the Spanish-language Section. In June 2008, Cardinal Secretary of State Tarcisio Bertone gave him the additional assignment of assistant to the President of the Pontifical Ecclesiastical Academy.

On 12 February 2015, Pope Francis appointed Chica Permanent Observer of the Holy See to three international food and agriculture agencies based in Rome: FAO, IFAD, and PAM.

In his hometown of Mengibar, there is a square named for him.

== See also ==
- List of heads of the diplomatic missions of the Holy See
