= Antonio Arcari =

Italian Catholic prelate (1953–2026)

His Excellency, The Most Reverend Antonio Arcari
- Apostolic Nuncio Emeritus of Monaco; Titular Archbishop of Caeciri
- Appointed: 25 May 2019
- Retired: 16 May 2023
- Predecessor: Luigi Pezzuto
- Other post: Titular Archbishop of Caeciri (2003–2026)
- Previous posts: Apostolic Nuncio of Honduras (2003–2008); Apostolic Nuncio of Mozambique (2008–2014); Apostolic Nuncio of Costa Rica (2014–2019)

Orders
- Ordination: 11 June 1977 by Luigi Morstabilini
- Consecration: 20 September 2003 by Angelo Sodano, Giulio Sanguineti, and Bruno Foresti

Personal details
- Born: 8 May 1953 Pralboino, Italy
- Died: 1 May 2026 (aged 72) Gavardo, Italy
- Motto: Dominus fortitudo mea
- Coat of arms

Styles of Antonio Arcari
- Reference style: His Excellency; The Most Reverend
- Spoken style: Your Excellency
- Religious style: Archbishop

Antonio Arcari (8 May 1953 – 1 May 2026) was an Italian prelate of the Catholic Church who spent his career in the diplomatic service of the Holy See and retired in 2023. He was an archbishop and held the rank of Apostolic Nuncio from 2003 until his death.

== Early life and priesthood ==
Antonio Arcari was born on 8 May 1953 in Pralboino, province of Brescia, Italy. The Bishop of Brescia, Luigi Morstabilini, ordained him a priest on 11 June 1977. On 23 September 1980, Pope John Paul II awarded him the honorary title of Chaplain to His Holiness (Monsignor).

== Diplomatic career ==
On 18 July 2003, Pope John Paul II appointed him Titular Archbishop of Caeciri and Apostolic Nuncio in Honduras. Episcopal consecration was given to him by Cardinal Angelo Sodano on 20 September of the same year; Co-consecrators were Archbishop Bruno Foresti, Bishop Emeritus of Brescia, and Giulio Sanguineti, Bishop of Brescia.

Pope Benedict XVI appointed him Apostolic Nuncio to Mozambique on 12 December 2008.

On 5 July 2014, Pope Francis appointed him Apostolic Nuncio in Costa Rica.

On 25 May 2019, Pope Francis appointed him Apostolic Nuncio in Monaco, and he accepted Arcari's resignation from that post on 16 May 2023.

== Death ==
Arcari died in Gavardo on 1 May 2026, at the age of 72.

== See also ==
- List of heads of the diplomatic missions of the Holy See

Catholic Church titles
Preceded by Luigi Pezzuto	Apostolic Nuncio to Monaco; 2019–2023	Succeeded by Martin Krebs
Preceded by Pierre Nguyên Van Tot	Apostolic Nuncio to Costa Rica; 2014–2019	Succeeded by Bruno Musarò
Preceded by George Panikulam	Apostolic Nuncio to Mozambique; 2008–2014	Succeeded by Edgar Peña Parra
Preceded by George Panikulam	Apostolic Nuncio to Honduras; 2003–2008	Succeeded by Luigi Bianco
Preceded by Miklós Beer	Titular Archbishop of Caeciri; 2003–2026	Succeeded by Vacant
