= François Bacqué =

French prelate of the Catholic Church (1936–2023)

His Excellency, The Most Reverend François Bacqué
- Apostolic Nuncio emeritus of the Netherlands; Titular Archbishop of Gradisca
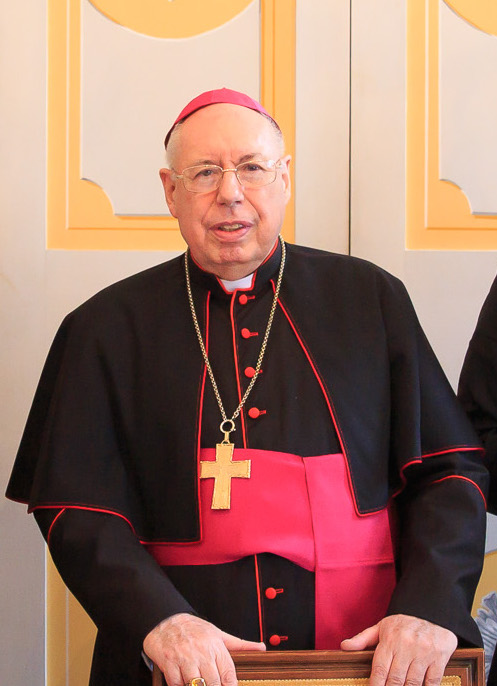
- Archbishop Bacqué, 2018
- Church: Catholic Church
- Appointed: 27 February 2001
- Retired: 15 December 2011
- Predecessor: Angelo Acerbi
- Successor: André Dupuy
- Previous posts: Apostolic Nuncio to the Dominican Republic and Apostolic Delegate to Puerto Rico (1994–2001); Apostolic Pro-Nuncio to Sri Lanka (1988–1994)

Orders
- Ordination: 1 October 1966 by Paul Marie André Richaud
- Consecration: 3 September 1988 by Agostino Casaroli, Marius Maziers and Thierry Jordan

Personal details
- Born: 9 February 1936 Bordeaux, France
- Died: 9 November 2023 (aged 87) Rome, Italy
- Motto: Servus Et Legatus (Servant and Ambassador)
- Coat of arms

Styles of François Bacqué
- Reference style: His Excellency; The Most Reverend
- Spoken style: Your Excellency
- Religious style: Archbishop

François Robert Bacqué (French: [fʀɑ̃swa ʀɔbɛʀ bake]; 2 September 1936 – 9 November 2023) was a French prelate of the Catholic Church who spent his career in the diplomatic service of the Holy See, fulfilling several assignments as an apostolic nuncio.

== Biography ==
François Robert Bacqué was born in Bordeaux, France, on 2 September 1936 and ordained a priest of the Archdiocese of Bordeaux on 1 October 1966. He completed a year of pastoral work at the parish of Notre-Dame d'Arcachon.

Bacqué studied in Rome, Paris, and Toulouse, earning degrees in canon law and political science, and completed the course of studies at the Pontifical Ecclesiastical Academy in 1967 and entered the diplomatic service of the Holy See in 1969. His early assignments included stints in the papal representatives' offices in China (1967–72), the Netherlands (1972–75), and Chile (1975–78); in Rome at the Secretariat of State and as a member of the Council for Public Affairs of the Church (1978–83); and then at the apostolic nunciatures in Portugal (1981–85) and Scandinavia (1985–88). In Chile he served under the nuncio Angelo Sodano, later Secretary of State, during the military dictatorship of Augusto Pinochet. Bacqué defended Sodano's record there, noting that the nunciature sheltered about thirty political refugees.

Pope John Paul II appointed him titular archbishop of Gradisca and Apostolic Pro-Nuncio to Sri Lanka on 17 June 1988. He received his episcopal consecration on 3 September 1988 from Cardinal Agostino Casaroli, the Secretary of State.

Pope John Paul named him Apostolic Nuncio to the Dominican Republic on 7 June 1994 and on 27 February 2001 Apostolic Nuncio to the Netherlands.

Bacqué retired upon the appointment of his successor in the Netherlands, André Dupuy, on 15 December 2011. He died in Rome on 9 November, at the age of 87.

== See also ==
- List of heads of the diplomatic missions of the Holy See
