= Luigi Travaglino =

Italian prelate of the Catholic Church (born 1939)

His Excellency, The Most Reverend Luigi Travaglino
- Apostolic Nuncio emeritus of Monaco; Titular Archbishop of Lettere
- Appointed: 8 September 2012
- Retired: 16 January 2016
- Predecessor: André Dupuy
- Successor: Luigi Pezzuto
- Other post: Titular Archbishop of Lettere
- Previous posts: Permanent Observer to the UN Food and Agriculture Organization (2011-2015); Apostolic Nuncio to Nicaragua (1995-2001); Apostolic Pro-Nuncio to Gambia, Guinea, and Liberia (1992-1995)

Orders
- Ordination: 15 August 1962
- Consecration: 26 April 1992 by Pope John Paul II, Franciszek Macharski, and Angelo Sodano

Personal details
- Born: September 6, 1939 (age 86) Brusciano, Naples, Italy

Styles of Luigi Travaglino
- Reference style: His Excellency; The Most Reverend
- Spoken style: Your Excellency
- Religious style: Archbishop

Luigi Travaglino (born 6 September 1939) is an Italian prelate of the Catholic Church who has worked in the diplomatic service of the Holy See since 1970, as a nuncio and archbishop since 1992.

== Biography ==
Luigi Travaglino was born on 6 September 1939 in Brusciano, Province of Naples, Italy. He was ordained a priest on 15 August 1962 for the Diocese of Nola. He then obtained a doctorate in canon law.

== Diplomatic career ==
He continued his studies at the Pontifical Ecclesiastical Academy and entered the diplomatic service of the Holy See in 1970. His postings included Bolivia, Ethiopia, Portugal, Scandinavia and Iceland, Zaire, San Salvador, the Netherlands, and Greece. In 1989, he returned to Rome to work in the General Section of the Secretariat of State.

Pope John Paul II named him titular archbishop of Lettere and Apostolic Delegate to Sierra Leone on 4 April 1992, adding the title Apostolic Pro-Nuncio to Guinea on 23 April, and Apostolic Pro-Nuncio to the Gambia and Liberia on 7 November.

He was consecrated a bishop on 26 April 1992 in St. Peter's Basilica by John Paul.

On 2 May 1995, Travaglino was appointed Apostolic Nuncio to Nicaragua. On 30 October 2001, Pope John Paul II transferred him to the Secretariat in Rome once again.

Pope Benedict XVI appointed him on 5 January 2011 the permanent observer of the Holy See to the UN Food and Agriculture Organization and International Fund for Agricultural Development and the World Food Programme and on 8 September 2012 added the title of Apostolic Nuncio to Monaco.

On 13 September 2014, Pope Francis made him a member of the Congregation for the Evangelization of Peoples.

His term as nuncio in Monaco ended on 16 January 2016 with the appointment of his successor.

== See also ==
- List of heads of the diplomatic missions of the Holy See
