= Rubén Darío Ruiz Mainardi =

Argentinian prelate

His Excellency, The Most Reverend Rubén Darío Ruiz Mainardi
- Apostolic Nuncio to Benin and Togo; Titular Archbishop of Ursona
- Appointed: 28 October 2024
- Predecessor: Mark Miles
- Other post: Titular Archbishop of Ursona

Orders
- Ordination: 26 May 1991
- Consecration: 14 December 2024 by Pietro Parolin, Edgar Peña Parra, and Luciano Russo

Personal details
- Born: 17 November 1964 (age 61) Córdoba, Argentina
- Motto: A te et per te
- Coat of arms

Styles of Rubén Darío Ruiz Mainardi
- Reference style: His Excellency; The Most Reverend
- Spoken style: Your Excellency
- Religious style: Archbishop

Rubén Darío Ruiz Mainardi (born 17 November 1964) is an Argentinian prelate of the Catholic Church who works in the diplomatic service of the Holy See.

== Biography ==
Rubén Darío Ruiz Mainardi was born on 17 November 1964 in Córdoba, Argentina. He was ordained a priest for the Diocese of Santo Tomé on 26 May 1991. He knows French, English, Italian and Portuguese.

== Diplomatic career ==
He obtained a licentiate in Dogmatic Theology and a Doctorate in Canon Law. He entered the diplomatic service of the Holy See on 1 March 2000, and has worked for the Pontifical Representations in the Republic of Congo and Gabon, Slovenia and Macedonia, Switzerland and Liechtenstein, Cuba, the Central African Republic and Chad, France and most recently in the Section for General Affairs of the Secretariat of State.

On 28 October 2024, Pope Francis appointed him Titular Archbishop of Ursona and Apostolic Nuncio to Benin and Togo. He was consecrated as an archbishop on 14 December 2024.

== See also ==
- List of heads of the diplomatic missions of the Holy See
