= Janusz Urbańczyk =

Polish Catholic priest and diplomat

His Excellency, The Most Reverend Janusz Urbańczyk
- Apostolic Nuncio to Zimbabwe; Titular Archbishop of Voli
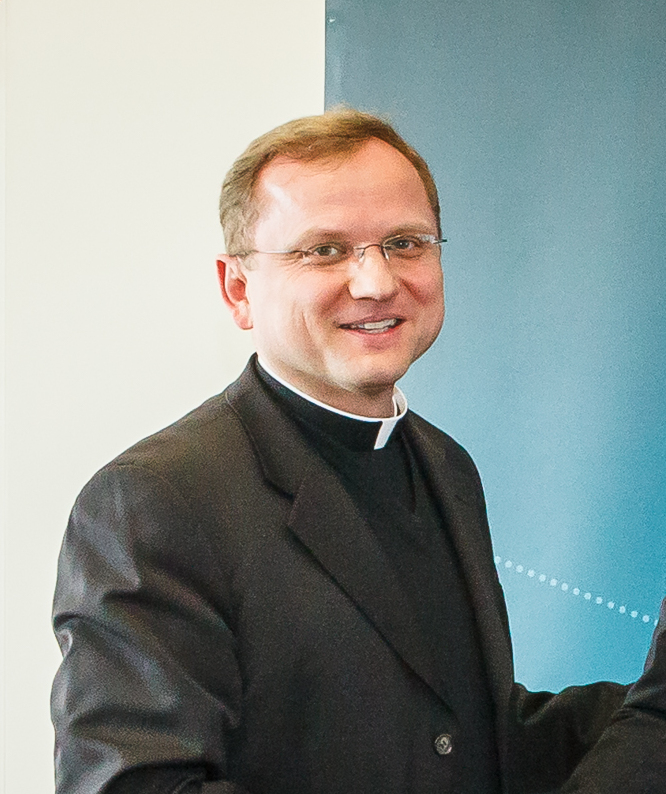
- Pictured in 2015.
- Church: Roman Catholic Church
- Appointed: 25 January 2024
- Predecessor: Paolo Rudelli
- Other post: Titular Archbishop of Voli
- Previous posts: Permanent Observer to the Office of the United Nations and Specialized Institutions in Vienna (2015-2024); Permanent Representative to the International Atomic Energy Agency Permanent Observer to the United Nations Industrial Development Organization Permanent Representative to the Organization for Security and Co-operation in Europe Permanent Representative to the Preparatory Commission for the Comprehensive Nuclear-Test-Ban Treaty Organization (2015-2024)

Orders
- Ordination: 13 June 1992 by Andrzej Śliwiński
- Consecration: 6 April 2024 by Pietro Parolin, Jacek Jezierski, and Michael Banach

Personal details
- Born: Janusz Urbańczyk; 19 May 1967 (age 59) Kraszewice, Poland
- Education: Pontifical Ecclesiastical Academy
- Motto: Voluntas Dei pax nostra
- Coat of arms

Styles of Janusz Urbańczyk
- Reference style: His Excellency; The Most Reverend
- Spoken style: Your Excellency
- Religious style: Archbishop

Janusz Urbańczyk (born 19 May 1967) is a Polish priest of the Catholic Church who works in the diplomatic service of the Holy See.

== Biography ==
Janusz Urbańczyk was born on 19 May 1967 in Kraszewice, Poland. After his philosophy and theology studies he was ordained a priest of the Roman Catholic Diocese of Elblag on 13 June 1992 and earned a doctorate in canon law, from the Pontifical University of St. Thomas Aquinas. To prepare for a diplomat's career he completed the course of study at the Pontifical Ecclesiastical Academy in 1993.

== Diplomatic career ==
He was a secretary in the Nunciatures of Bolivia (1997-2000), Slovakia (2000–2004), New Zealand (2004-2007) and as second counsellor in Kenya (2007-2010), Slovenia and Macedonia (2010-2012). In 2012, he had the title counsellor in the office of the Permanent Observer of the Holy See to the United Nations in New York.

On 12 January 2015, Pope Francis named Urbańczyk to several related positions within the diplomatic service, all based in Vienna. They include Permanent Representative of the Holy See to the International Atomic Energy Agency (IAEA), the Organization for Security and Cooperation in Europe (OSCE), and the Preparatory Commission for the Comprehensive Nuclear-Test-Ban Treaty Organization (CTBTO); as well as Permanent Observer of the Holy See at the United Nations Industrial Development Organization (ONUDI) and the United Nations Office in Vienna.

On 25 January 2024, Pope Francis named him Apostolic Nuncio to Zimbabwe while also assigning him the title of Titular Archbishop of Voli. On 6 April 2024, he was consecrated as an archbishop.

== See also ==
- List of heads of the diplomatic missions of the Holy See
