= Apostolic Nunciature to Ghana =

Diplomatic post of the Holy See in Ghana

The Apostolic Nunciature to Ghana is an ecclesiastical office of the Catholic Church in Ghana. It is a diplomatic post of the Holy See, whose representative is called the Apostolic Nuncio, with the rank of an ambassador.

Julien Kaboré was appointed apostolic nuncio to Ghana in 2024.

In 1948, the Holy See established the delegation to Dakar led by Marcel-François Lefebvre to represent its interests in French colonial Africa. Following the decolonization of the region, the title of that position was changed to Apostolic Delegate to Western Africa on 23 September 1960 and given responsibility for Senegal, Upper Volta, Côte d'Ivoire, Dahomey (Benin), Guinea, Mauritania, Niger, Sudan, Togo, Ghana, Gambia, and Sierra Leone. After further reorganizations of its offices for the emerging independent nations of Africa, the Holy See created the Delegation to Nigeria and Ghana–a single office–in May 1973. Separate nunciatures for Ghana and Nigeria were erected on 29 April 1976.

== List of papal representatives ==
Apostolic Delegates

- Girolamo Prigione (2 October 1973 - 28 April 1976)

Apostolic Pro-Nuncio

- Giuseppe Ferraioli (14 June 1976 - 21 July 1981)
- Ivan Dias (8 May 1982 - 20 June 1987)
- Giuseppe Bertello (17 October 1987 - 12 January 1991)
- Abraham Kattumana (8 May 1991 - 16 December 1992)

Apostolic Nuncio

- André Dupuy (6 April 1993 - 27 March 2000)
- George Kocherry (10 June 2000 - 22 December 2007)
- Léon Kalenga Badikebele (1 March 2008 - 22 February 2013)
- Jean-Marie Speich (17 August 2013 - 19 March 2019)
- Henryk Jagodziński (3 May 2020 – 16 April 2024)
- Julien Kaboré (since 29 June 2024)
