= Richard Allen Gyhra =

Monsignor Richard Allen Gyhra
- Permanent Observer to the United Nations Office at Vienna
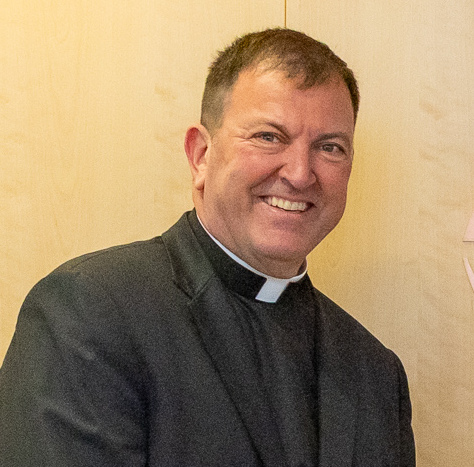
- Gyhra in 2024
- Appointed: 1 July 2024
- Predecessor: Janusz Urbańczyk

Orders
- Ordination: 22 May 1999 by Fabian Bruskewitz

Personal details
- Born: 26 August 1974 (age 52) Pawnee City, Nebraska

Richard Allen Gyhra (born 26 August 1974) is an American prelate of the Catholic Church who works in the diplomatic service of the Holy See.

== Biography ==
Richard Allen Gyhra was born in Pawnee City, Nebraska. He was ordained a priest for the Roman Catholic Diocese of Lincoln on 22 May 1999. He received his doctorate in sacred theology from the Pontifical University of Saint Thomas Aquinas and later was appointed to study at the Pontifical Ecclesiastical Academy in Rome.

== Diplomatic career ==
Gyhra has worked at the Apostolic Nunciatures of the Dominican Republic, the Permanent Observer Mission of the Holy See to the United Nations in Geneva and Tanzania. He has also served five years as a desk officer for multilateral affairs in the Vatican's Secretary of State.

On 1 July 2024, Pope Francis appointed him Permanent Observer to the United Nations Office at Vienna and Permanent Representative to the OSCE.

== See also ==
- List of heads of the diplomatic missions of the Holy See
