= Alberto Bottari de Castello =

Italian prelate of the Catholic Church (1942–2025)

His Excellency, The Most Reverend Alberto Bottari de Castello
- Apostolic Nuncio emeritus of Hungary; Titular Archbishop of Opitergium
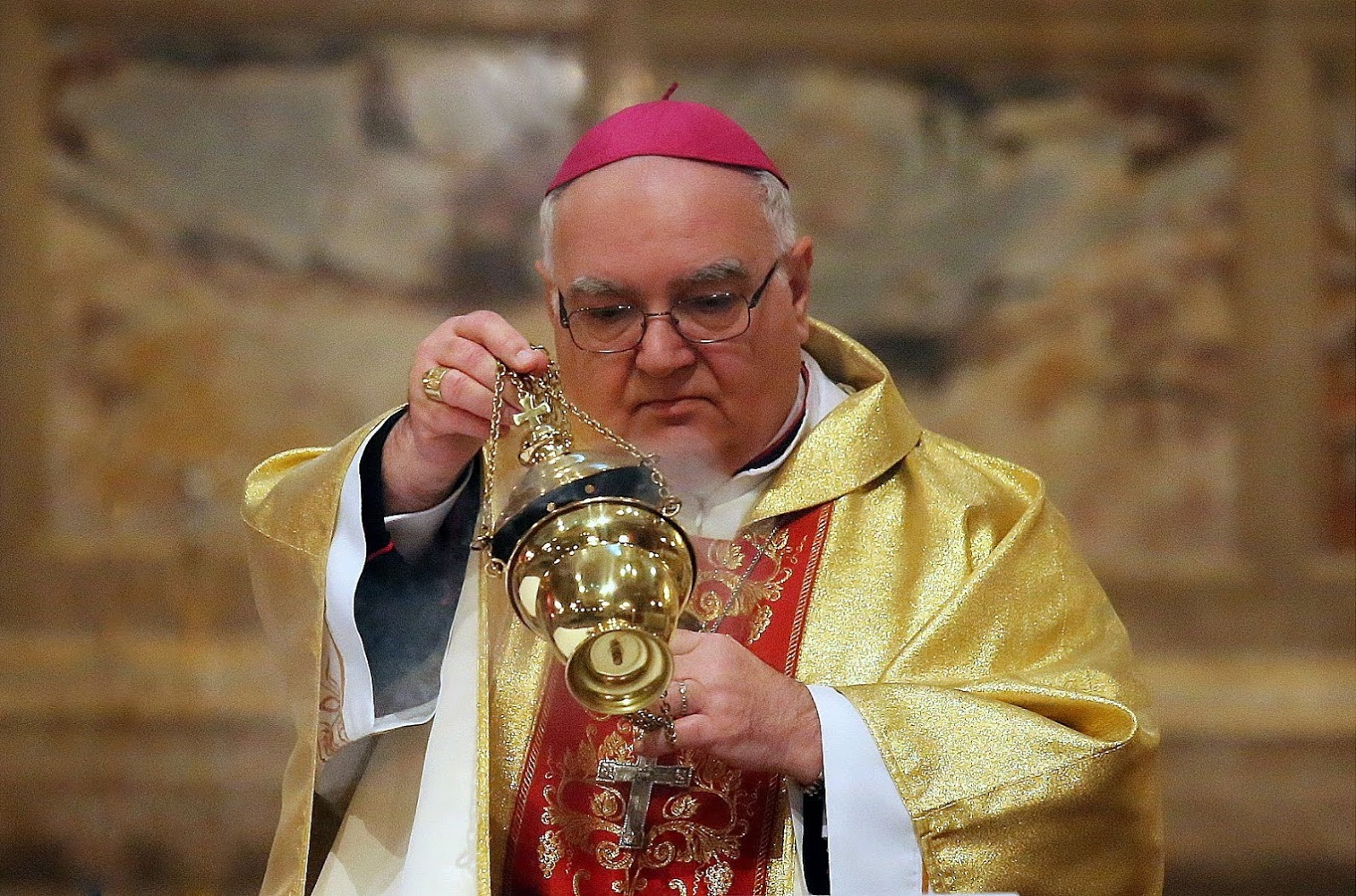
- Bottari de Castello in 2014
- Appointed: 6 June 2011
- Retired: December 2017
- Predecessor: Juliusz Janusz
- Successor: Michael August Blume
- Other posts: Titular Archbishop of Foratiana (1999–2007); Titular Archbishop of Opitergium (2007–2025)
- Previous posts: Apostolic Nuncio to Japan (2005–2011); Apostolic Nuncio to Gambia, Guinea, Liberia and Sierra Leone (1999–2005)

Orders
- Ordination: 11 September 1966 by Antonio Mistrorigo
- Consecration: 6 January 2000 by Pope John Paul II, Giovanni Battista Re, and Marcello Zago

Personal details
- Born: 5 July 1942 Montebelluna, Italy
- Died: 13 July 2025 (aged 83) Treviso, Italy

Styles of Alberto Bottari de Castello
- Reference style: His Excellency; The Most Reverend
- Spoken style: Your Excellency
- Religious style: Archbishop

Alberto Bottari de Castello (5 July 1942 – 13 July 2025) was an Italian prelate of the Catholic Church who spent his career in the diplomatic service of the Holy See.

== Biography ==
Alberto Bottari de Castello was born in Montebelluna, Province of Treviso in northern Italy, on 5 July 1942. He was ordained a priest on 11 September 1966.

He prepared for a diplomatic career by completing the course of study at the Pontifical Ecclesiastical Academy in 1969.

=== Diplomatic career ===
On 18 December 1999, Pope John Paul II named him a titular archbishop and nuncio to the Gambia, Guinea, Liberia, and Sierra Leone. He was consecrated a bishop on 6 January 2000.

He was appointed Apostolic Nuncio to Japan on 1 April 2005.

Pope Benedict XVI named him nuncio to Hungary on 7 June 2011.

=== Retirement and death ===
Bottari de Castello retired after reaching the age of 75.

Hungary awarded him the Commander's Crosses with Star of the Order of Merit of the Republic of Hungary.

Bottari de Castello died on 13 July 2025, at the age of 83.

== See also ==
- List of heads of the diplomatic missions of the Holy See

Catholic Church titles
Preceded by Raffaele Farina	Titular Archbishop of Opitergium; 2007–2025	Succeeded by Vacant
Preceded by John William Comber	Titular Archbishop of Foratiana; 1999–2007	Succeeded by José Elías Rauda Gutiérrez
