= Marek Zalewski (bishop) =

Polish prelate of the Catholic Church (born 1963)

His Excellency, The Most Reverend Marek Zalewski
- Apostolic Nuncio to Singapore; Resident Pontifical Representative to Vietnam
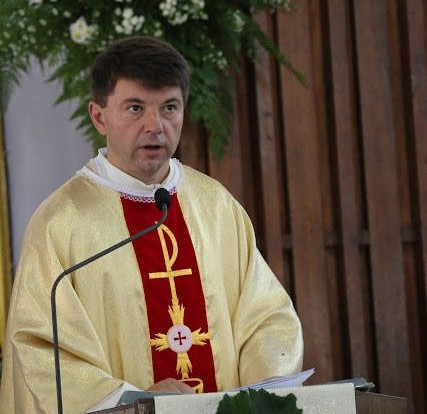
- Appointed: 21 May 2018
- Predecessor: Leopoldo Girelli
- Other post: Titular Archbishop of Africa
- Previous post: Apostolic Nuncio to Zimbabwe (2014-2018)

Orders
- Ordination: 27 May 1989 by Juliusz Paetz
- Consecration: 31 May 2014 by Pietro Parolin, Janusz Stepnowski and Romuald Kamiński

Personal details
- Born: 2 February 1963 (age 63) Augustow, Poland People's Republic
- Motto: Lumen vitae Christus (Latin for 'Christ, light of life')
- Styles
- Reference style: His Excellency; The Most Reverend
- Spoken style: Your Excellency
- Religious style: Archbishop

Marek Zalewski (born 2 February 1963) is a Polish prelate of the Catholic Church who works in the diplomatic service of the Holy See. He has been the Apostolic Nuncio to Singapore since May 2018 and Resident Papal Representative to Vietnam since December 2023.

== Biography ==
Zalewski was born in Augustow, Poland, on 2 February 1963 to Jan Zalewski and Klara née Krucynska Zalewska. From 1983 to 1985 he studied at the major seminary in Łomża and from 1985 to 1989 at the metropolitan seminary in Florence, Italy. He was ordained a priest of the Diocese of Łomża on 27 May 1989.

He worked as a parish priest in Florence for two years and then completed his doctorate in canon law at the Pontifical Gregorian University in 1995 while also preparing for a diplomat's career at the Pontifical Ecclesiastical Academy.

== Diplomatic career ==
He entered the diplomatic service of the Holy See on 1 July 1995. He worked in the Central African Republic (1995-1998), at the United Nations in New York (1998-2001), in Great Britain (2001-2004), Germany (2004-2008), Thailand (2008-2011), Singapore (2011-2012), and Malaysia (2012-2014).

On 25 March 2014, Pope Francis named Zalewski titular archbishop of Africa (Note: The old part of the Tunisian city of Mahdia corresponds to the ancient Roman city called Aphrodisium and, later, Africa.) and Apostolic Nuncio to Zimbabwe. He received his episcopal consecration from Cardinal Pietro Parolin, the Secretary of State, on 31 May.

On 21 May 2018, Pope Francis named him Apostolic Nuncio to Singapore and Non-Residential Papal Representative to Vietnam. On 23 December 2023, Pope Francis named him Resident Papal Representative in Vietnam. On 31 January 2024, he arrived in Vietnam to take up his current position.

== See also ==
- List of heads of the diplomatic missions of the Holy See
