= Karl-Josef Rauber =

German cardinal (1934–2023)

His Eminence Karl-Josef Rauber
- Apostolic Nuncio
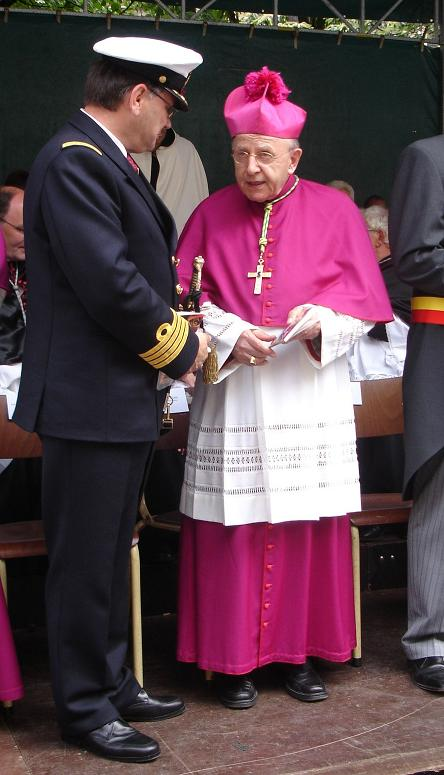
- Rauber in 2007
- Appointed: 22 February 2003
- Term ended: 18 June 2009
- Predecessor: Pier Luigi Celata
- Successor: Giacinto Berloco
- Other post: Cardinal-Deacon of Sant'Antonio di Padova a Circonvallazione Appia (2015–2023)
- Previous posts: Apostolic Nuncio to Hungary and Moldova (1997–2003); Apostolic Nuncio to Switzerland and Liechtenstein (1993–1997); President of the Pontifical Ecclesiastical Academy (1990–1993); Titular Archbishop of Iubaltiana (1983–2015); Apostolic Pro-Nuncio to Uganda (1982–1990)

Orders
- Ordination: 28 February 1959 by Albert Stohr
- Consecration: 6 January 1983 by Pope John Paul II
- Created cardinal: 14 February 2015 by Pope Francis
- Rank: Cardinal-Deacon

Personal details
- Born: Karl-Josef Rauber; 11 April 1934 Nuremberg, Germany
- Died: 26 March 2023 (aged 88) Rottenburg am Neckar, Germany
- Denomination: Roman Catholic
- Motto: Caritas Christi urget nos (The Love of Christ compels us)
- Coat of arms

Ordination history of Karl-Josef Rauber
History
Priestly ordination
- Date: 28 February 1959
Episcopal consecration
- Principal consecrator: Pope John Paul II
- Co-consecrators: Eduardo Martinez Somalo; Duraisamy Simon Lourdusamy
- Date: 6 January 1983
Cardinalate
- Elevated by: Pope Francis
- Date: 14 February 2015

Styles of Karl Josef Rauber
- Reference style: His Eminence
- Spoken style: Your Eminence
- Religious style: Cardinal
- Informal style: Cardinal

Karl-Josef Rauber (11 April 1934 – 26 March 2023) was a German prelate of the Catholic Church who served as an apostolic nuncio from 1982 until his retirement in 2009. He was created a cardinal by Pope Francis in 2015.

== Biography ==
After graduating from St.-Michaels-Gymnasium of Metten Abbey in 1950, Rauber studied Catholic theology and philosophy at the University of Mainz. On 28 February 1959, he was ordained in Mainz Cathedral by Bishop Albert Stohr. He was a chaplain in Nidda and in 1962 earned a doctoral degree in canon law at the Pontifical Gregorian University in Rome. At the same time, he attended the Pontifical Ecclesiastical Academy. At the State Secretariat beginning in 1966, Rauber was one of four secretaries of the Substitute of the Secretariat of State, Archbishop Giovanni Benelli. He was primarily responsible for the German-speaking territories. Pope Paul VI awarded him on 22 December 1976 the title of Honorary Prelate of His Holiness. Since 1977, he worked at the Nunciature to Belgium and Luxembourg, and since 1981, in Greece.

On 18 December 1982, Pope John Paul II appointed him Titular Archbishop of Iubaltiana and pro-nuncio to Uganda. Pope John Paul II also consecrated him as bishop on 6 January 1983. Co-consecrators were the ex officio in the Vatican Secretariat of State, Eduardo Martínez Somalo and the Secretary of the Congregation for the Evangelization of Peoples, Duraisamy Simon Lourdusamy. His motto was "Caritas Christi urget nos" (The love of Christ drives us, also sometimes translated as The love of Christ impels us).

On 22 January 1990, Pope John Paul II appointed Rauber as President of the Pontifical Ecclesiastical Academy, a post he held until 16 March 1993. In 1991, he was assigned to investigate the problems encountered in the Diocese of Chur by Bishop Wolfgang Haas. He continued to have responsibility for that troubled diocese when he returned to the diplomatic service of the Holy See when he was named Apostolic Nuncio to Switzerland on 16 March 1993 and to Liechtenstein on 17 April 1993. Though Cardinal Josef Ratzinger, later Pope Benedict XVI, criticized him for failing to support Haas against his critics, Rauber's solution, moving Haas to Liechtenstein, proved effective and long-lasting. His next appointment was on 25 April 1997 as Apostolic Nuncio to Hungary and Moldova. On 22 February 2003, he was named Apostolic Nuncio to Belgium and Luxembourg. When the Church leadership in Rome passed over his recommendation of three candidates for the position of Archbishop of Mechelen-Brussels and Pope Benedict XVI named André-Joseph Léonard to the position instead, Rauber objected publicly and described Léonard as wholly unsuited for the appointment.

Pope Benedict XVI accepted his resignation for reasons of age in 2009.

On 4 January 2015, Pope Francis announced that he would make him a cardinal on 14 February. At that ceremony, he was created Cardinal-Deacon of the titular church of Sant'Antonio di Padova a Circonvallazione Appia. His appointment was called "surprising", and Bayerischer Rundfunk reported "much speculation that perhaps Francis deliberately wanted to honor a man who did not always have an easy time with the Roman system".

Rauber died in Rottenburg near Tübingen, on 26 March 2023, at the age of 88. He had lived there in retirement with the Schoenstatt sisters. He had been in poor health for several years and was weakened by the COVID-19 virus in 2022.

== See also ==
- Cardinals created by Pope Francis
- List of heads of the diplomatic missions of the Holy See

Diplomatic posts
Preceded by Henri Lemaître	Apostolic Pro-Nuncio to Uganda; 18 December 1982 – 22 January 1990	Succeeded by Luis Robles Díaz
Educational offices
Preceded by Justin Francis Rigali	President of the Pontifical Ecclesiastical Academy; 1990–1993	Succeeded by Gabriel Montalvo Higuera
Diplomatic posts
Preceded by Edoardo Rovida	Apostolic Nuncio to Switzerland and Liechtenstein; 16 March 1993 – 25 April 1997	Succeeded by Oriano Quilici
Preceded by Angelo Acerbi	Apostolic Nuncio to Hungary; 25 April 1997 – 22 February 2003	Succeeded by Juliusz Janusz
Preceded by Angelo Acerbi	Apostolic Nuncio to Moldova; 25 April 1997 – 22 February 2003	Succeeded by Jean-Claude Périsset
Preceded by Pier Luigi Celata	Apostolic Nuncio to Belgium; 22 February 2003 – 18 June 2009	Succeeded by Giacinto Berloco
Catholic Church titles
Preceded by Julien Ries	Cardinal Deacon of Sant'Antonio di Padova a Circonvallazione Appia; 2015–2023	Succeeded by Vacant
