= Pier Giacomo De Nicolò =

Italian priest (1929–2021)

- Apostolic Nuncio to Switzerland & Liechtenstein
- Church: Catholic Church
- In office: 21 January 1999 – 8 September 2004
- Predecessor: Oriano Quilici
- Successor: Francesco Canalini
- Other posts: Titular Archbishop of Martanae Tudertinorum (1984-2021)
- Previous posts: Apostolic Nuncio to Syria (1993-1999); Apostolic Nuncio to Costa Rica (1984-1993)

Orders
- Ordination: 12 April 1952
- Consecration: 20 October 1984 by Agostino Casaroli

Personal details
- Born: 11 March 1929 Cattolica, Province of Forlì, Kingdom of Italy
- Died: 3 April 2021 (aged 92) Rome, Italy

Pier Giacomo De Nicolò (11 March 1929 – 3 April 2021) was an Italian prelate of the Catholic Church who spent his career in the diplomatic service of the Holy See, including stints as Apostolic Nuncio in Costa Rica, Syria, and Switzerland.

== Biography ==
Pier Giacomo De Nicolò was born in Cattolica in the Province of Rimini on 11 March 1929.

He was ordained a priest on 12 April 1952.

To prepare for a diplomatic career he entered the Pontifical Ecclesiastical Academy in 1956.

On 14 August 1984, Pope John Paul II named him a titular archbishop and Apostolic Nuncio to Costa Rica.

He received his episcopal consecration from Cardinal Agostino Casaroli on 20 October 1984.

On 11 February 1993, Pope John Paul appointed him Apostolic Nuncio to Syria.

On 21 January 1999, Pope John Paul named him Apostolic Nuncio to Switzerland and Liechtenstein.

Pope John Paul accepted his resignation from those positions on 8 September 2004.

Two of his brothers were also bishops: Paolo De Nicolò and Mariano De Nicolò.
