= Léon Kalenga Badikebele =

Congolese prelate (1956–2019)

- Apostolic Nuncio to Argentina
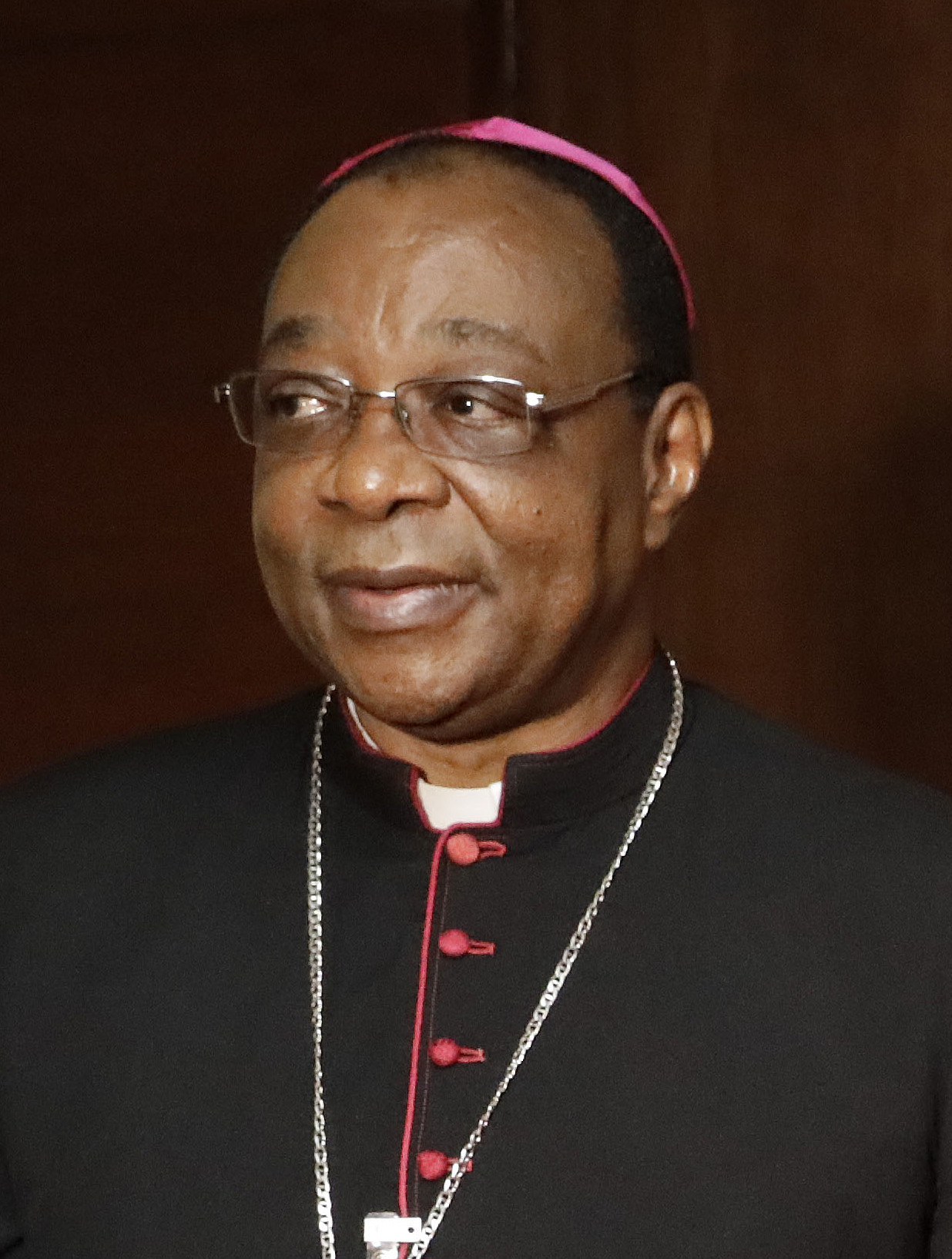
- Léon Kalenga Badikebele in 2017
- Church: Catholic Church
- See: Apostolic Nunciature to Argentina
- In office: 17 March 2018 – 12 June 2019
- Predecessor: Emil Paul Tscherrig
- Successor: Mirosław Adamczyk
- Other post: Titular Archbishop of Magnetum (2008-2019)
- Previous posts: Apostolic Nuncio to Belize & El Salvador (2013-2018); Apostolic Nuncio to Ghana (2008-2013)

Orders
- Ordination: 5 September 1982 by François Kabangu wa Mutela
- Consecration: 1 May 2008 by Tarcisio Bertone

Personal details
- Born: 17 July 1956 Kamina, Katanga Province, Belgian Congo, Belgian Empire
- Died: 12 June 2019 (aged 62) Rome, Italy

Léon Kalenga Badikebele (17 July 1956 – 12 June 2019) was a Congolese prelate of the Catholic Church who worked in the diplomatic service of the Holy See. He held the rank of Apostolic Nuncio beginning in 2008 and was Nuncio to Argentina from 2018 until his death in June 2019.

== Biography ==
He was born in Kamina, Haut-Lomami, then in the Belgian Congo, on 17 July 1956. He was ordained a priest for the Diocese of Luebo on 5 September 1982.

In 1988 he entered the Pontifical Ecclesiastical Academy and on 27 February 1990 entered the diplomatic service of the Holy See. His early assignments took him to Haiti, Guatemala, Zambia, Brazil, Egypt, Zimbabwe and Japan.

On 1 March 2008, Pope Benedict XVI named him Titular Archbishop of Magnetum and Apostolic Nuncio to Ghana. He chose as his episcopal motto the phrase: "Fortes in fide", which means, "Strong in Faith". He received his episcopal consecration on 1 May from Cardinal Tarcisio Bertone.

On 22 February 2013, Pope Benedict named him Nuncio to El Salvador, and on 13 April Pope Francis named him Nuncio to Belize as well.

On 17 March 2018, Pope Francis appointed him Apostolic Nuncio to Argentina.

He died in Rome on 12 June 2019 after a long illness. Pope Francis celebrated his funeral Mass on 15 June, which the members of the Holy See's diplomatic corps, then gathered in Rome for their triennial conference, attended.
