= Apostolic Nunciature to Togo =

Diplomatic mission of the Holy See in West Africa

The Apostolic Nunciature to Togo is the diplomatic mission of the Holy See to Togo. The Apostolic Nuncio to Togo is an ecclesiastical office of the Catholic Church in Togo, with the rank of an ambassador. The nuncio serves both as the ambassador of the Holy See to Benin and as the point-of-contact between the Catholic hierarchy in Togo and the Pope.

In 1948, the Holy See established the Delegation to Dakar led by Marcel-François Lefebvre to represent its interests in French colonial Africa. Following the decolonization of the region, the title of that position was changed to Apostolic Delegate to Western Africa on 23 September 1960 and given responsibility for Senegal, Upper Volta, Côte d'Ivoire, Dahomey (Benin), Guinea, Mauritania, Niger, Sudan, Togo, Ghana, Gambia, and Sierra Leone. Over the next decade, as the Vatican established relationships with individual countries, country-specific offices were created, including the Delegations to Guinea, Togo, Mali, and Mauritania on 21 May 1973.

The title Apostolic Nuncio to Togo is held by the prelate appointed Apostolic Nuncio to Benin; he resides in Benin.

== List of papal representatives to Togo ==
Apostolic Delegates

- Bruno Wüstenberg (20 December 1973 – 17 January 1979)
- Giuseppe Ferraioli (25 August 1979 – 21 July 1981)

Apostolic Pro-Nuncios

- Ivan Dias (8 May 1982 – 20 June 1987)
- Giuseppe Bertello (17 October 1987 – 12 January 1991)
- Abraham Kattumana (8 May 1991 – 16 December 1992)

Apostolic Nuncios

- André Dupuy (6 April 1993 – 27 March 2000)
- George Kocherry (10 June 2000 – 2002)
- Pierre Nguyên Van Tot (25 November 2002 – 24 August 2005)
- Michael August Blume (24 August 2005 – 2 February 2013)
- Brian Udaigwe (16 July 2013 – 13 June 2020)
- Mark Miles (2 March 2021 – 9 July 2024)
- Rubén Darío Ruiz Mainardi (28 October 2024 – present)
