= Apostolic Nunciature to Zimbabwe =

Diplomatic mission of the Holy See in Africa

The Apostolic Nunciature to Zimbabwe is an ecclesiastical office of the Catholic Church in Zimbabwe. It is a diplomatic post of the Holy See, whose representative is called the Apostolic Nuncio with the rank of an ambassador.

The Holy See and Zimbabwe established diplomatic relations on 26 June 1980, and Pope John Paul II erected the Nunciature to Zimbabwe on 27 June 1980.

== List of papal representatives ==
Apostolic Pro-Nuncio

- Francesco Colasuonno (7 March 1981 - 8 January 1985)
- Patrick Coveney (27 July 1985 - 25 January 1990)
- Giacinto Berloco (15 March 1990 - 17 July 1993)

Apostolic Nuncio

- Peter Paul Prabhu (13 November 1993 - 1 July 2002)
- Edward Joseph Adams (22 August 2002 - 3 September 2007)
- George Kocherry (22 December 2007 - 6 July 2013)
- Marek Zalewski (25 March 2014 - 21 May 2018)
- Paolo Rudelli (25 January 2020 – 19 July 2023)
- Janusz Urbańczyk (25 January 2024 – present)
