= Mark Miles =

20th and 21st-century Catholic priest

His Excellency, The Most Reverend Mark Miles
- Apostolic Nuncio to Costa Rica; Titular Archbishop of Città Ducale
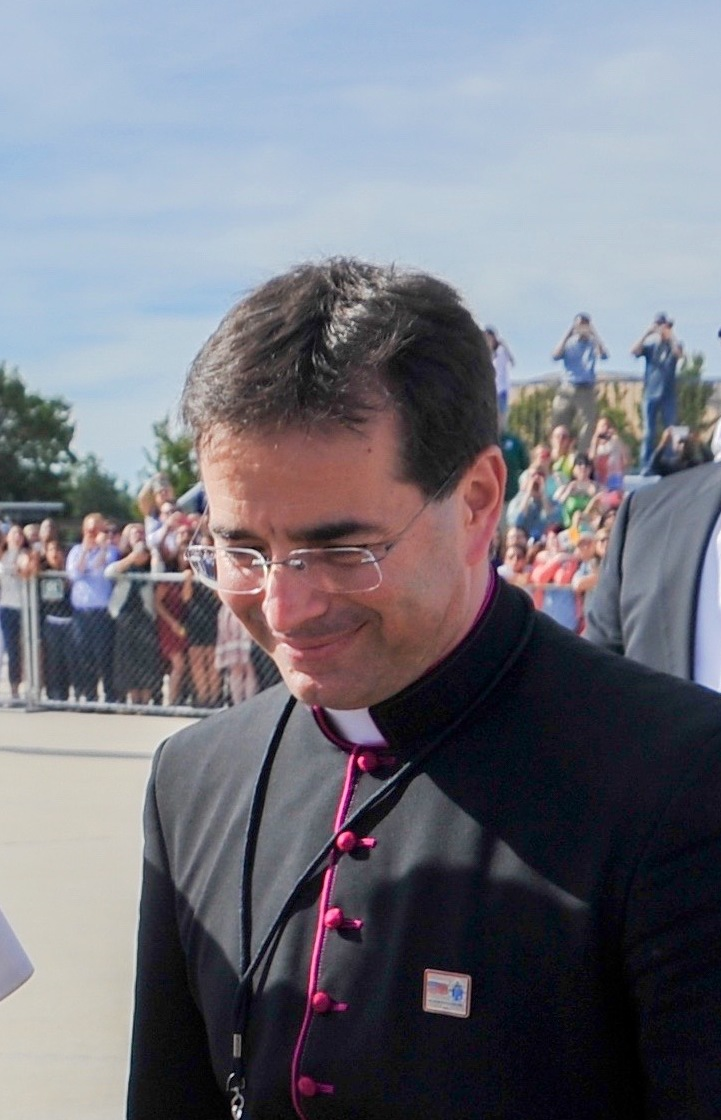
- Miles interpreting for Pope Francis.
- Church: Roman Catholic Church
- Appointed: 9 July 2024
- Predecessor: Bruno Musarò
- Other post: Titular Archbishop of Città Ducale
- Previous posts: Apostolic Nuncio to Benin and Togo (2021-2024); Permanent Observer of the Holy See to the Organization of American States (2019-2021)

Orders
- Ordination: 14 September 1996 by Bernard Patrick Devlin
- Consecration: 25 April 2021 by Pietro Parolin, Arthur Roche and Carmelo Zammit

Personal details
- Born: Mark Gerard Miles; 13 May 1967 (age 59) Gibraltar
- Denomination: Catholic (Roman Rite)
- Education: Pontifical Ecclesiastical Academy
- Motto: Parare Viam Domini
- Coat of arms

Styles of Mark Gerard Miles
- Reference style: His Excellency; The Most Reverend
- Spoken style: Your Excellency
- Religious style: Archbishop

Mark Gerard Miles (born 13 May 1967) is a Gibraltarian prelate of the Catholic Church who works in the diplomatic service of the Holy See.

== Biography ==
Mark Gerard Miles was born in Gibraltar on 13 May 1967. He was ordained a priest on 14 September 1996. He holds a degree in canon law.

== Diplomatic career ==
He prepared for a career in the diplomatic service at the Pontifical Ecclesiastical Academy and his early assignments included stints in Ecuador and Hungary and in Rome in the Section for General Affairs of the Secretariat of State.

During Pope Francis' visit to the Philippines and the United States in 2015, his simultaneous interpretation into English was highly commended by the public. In September 2015, Miles was awarded the Gibraltar Medallion of Distinction.

On 31 August 2019, Pope Francis named him Permanent Observer of the Holy See to the Organization of American States.

On 5 February 2021, Pope Francis appointed Miles Apostolic Nuncio to Benin and titular archbishop of Città Ducale. Miles is the first Gibraltarian to hold the rank of nuncio and the first to become an archbishop. On 2 March he was given responsibility for Togo as well.

On 9 July 2024, he was appointed nuncio to Costa Rica.

== See also ==
- List of heads of the diplomatic missions of the Holy See
