= Jean-Sylvain Emien Mambé =

Apostolic Nuncio to Mali

His Excellency, The Most Reverend Jean-Sylvain Emien Mambé
- Apostolic Nuncio of Guinea and Mali; Titular Archbishop of Potenza Picena
- Appointed: 2 February 2022
- Predecessor: Tymon Tytus Chmielecki
- Other post: Titular Archbishop of Potenza Picena

Orders
- Ordination: 14 December 1997
- Consecration: 7 May 2022 by Pietro Parolin, Jean-Pierre Kutwa, and Jean Salomon Lezoutié

Personal details
- Born: September 16, 1970 (age 55) Jacqueville, Côte d’Ivoire
- Motto: Ministrare Non Ministrari

Styles of Jean-Sylvain Emien Mambé
- Reference style: His Excellency; The Most Reverend
- Spoken style: Your Excellency
- Religious style: Archbishop

Jean-Sylvain Emien Mambé (born 16 September 1970) is an Ivorian prelate of the Catholic Church who works in the diplomatic service of the Holy See.

== Biography ==
Jean-Sylvain Emien Mambé was born on 16 September 1970 in Jacqueville, Côte d'Ivoire. He was ordained a priest for the Diocese of Yopougon on 14 December 1997.

== Diplomatic career ==
He entered the diplomatic service of the Holy See on 1 July 2005 and served in the pontifical representations in Angola, Nigeria, New Zealand, Spain, the Czech Republic, Guinea and Mali. He holds a degree in canon law.

On 2 February 2022, Pope Francis appointed him Titular Archbishop of Potenza Picena and Apostolic Nuncio to Mali. On 12 November 2022, he was appointed nuncio of Guinea as well.

== See also ==
- List of heads of the diplomatic missions of the Holy See
