= Bruno Wüstenberg =

German prelate

- Apostolic Pro-Nuncio to Netherlands
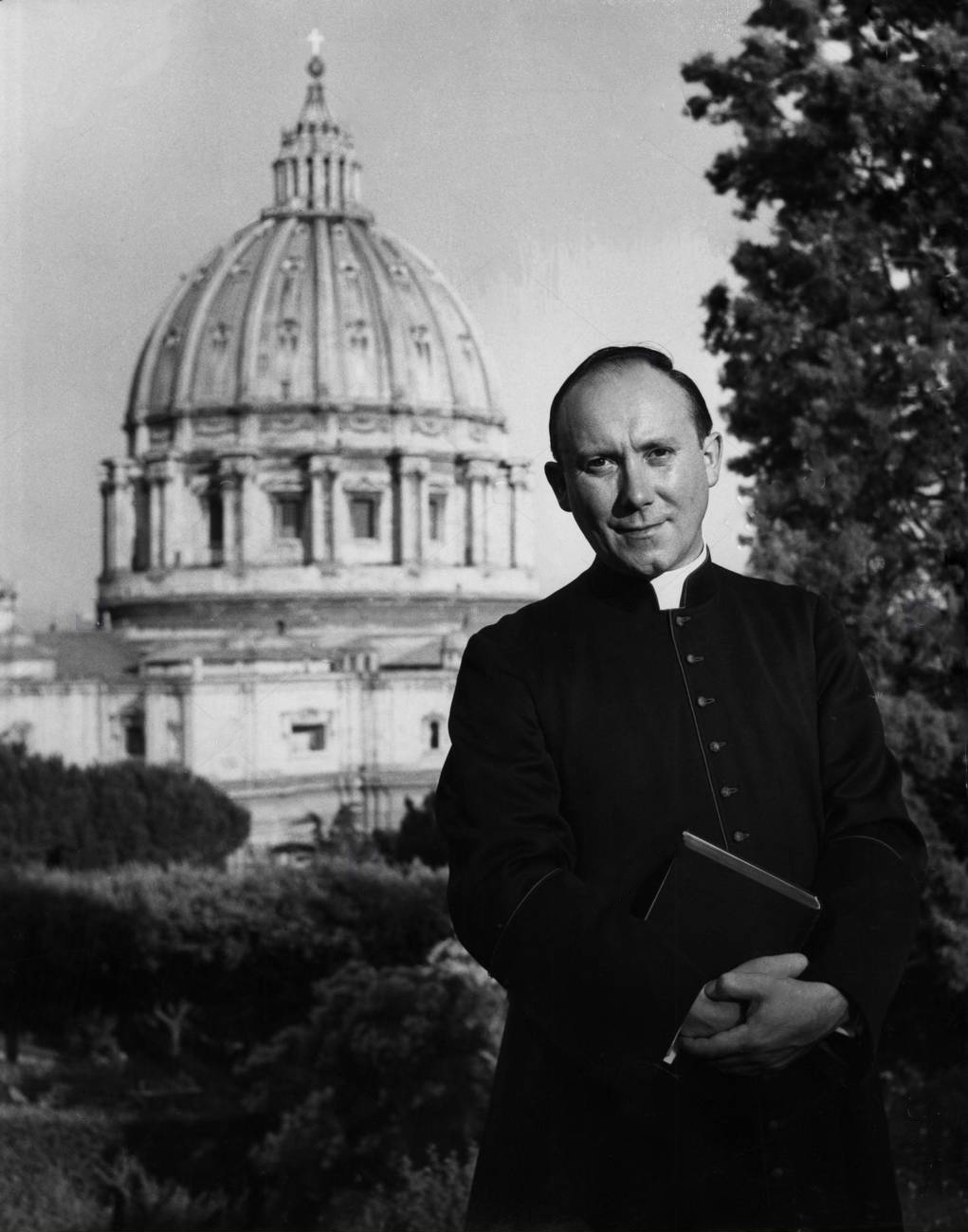
- Church: Catholic Church
- In office: 17 January 1979 – 31 May 1984
- Predecessor: John Gordon
- Successor: Edward Cassidy
- Other post: Titular Archbishop of Tyrus (1966-1984)
- Previous posts: Apostolic Delegate to Togo & Guinea (1973-1979); Apostolic Pro-Nuncio to Côte d'Ivoire (1973-1979); Apostolic Pro-Nuncio to Benin (1975-1979); Apostolic Pro-Nuncio to Dahomey (1973-1975); Apostolic Pro-Nuncio to Japan (1966-1973)

Orders
- Ordination: 3 March 1938
- Consecration: 21 December 1966 by Josef Frings

Personal details
- Born: Bruno Thomas Wilhelm Wüstenberg; 10 March 1912 Duisburg, Rhine Province, Kingdom of Prussia, German Empire
- Died: 31 May 1984 (aged 72) Freiburg im Breisgau, Baden-Württemberg, West Germany

Bruno Wüstenberg (10 March 1912 – 31 May 1984) was a German prelate of the Catholic Church who spent his career in the diplomatic service of the Holy See.

== Biography ==
Bruno Wüstenberg was born on 10 March 1912 in Duisburg, Germany. He studied Catholic theology at the University of Bonn, the Albert-Ludwigs-Universität Freiburg, and at the seminary in Bensberg near Cologne. He was ordained a priest on 3 March 1938 in Cologne Cathedral and then did pastoral work for a short time in Ulm.

He studied law at the Pontifical Gregorian University and in 1945 joined the Roman Curia's Department of Prisoner of War Services. He headed the German-speaking department of the Secretariat of State from 1947 to 1966. In that position he was instrumental in reconciling Germany's two largest political parties, the CDU and the SPD, which required reaching an understanding between the Church and the latter party once it jettisoned its Marxist philosophy in 1959. Die Zeit called him "one of the secret pioneers of the grand coalition" after he engineered a meeting of Fritz Erler, deputy chair of the SPD, with Pope Paul in 1964.

On 24 October 1966, Pope Paul VI named him titular archbishop of Tyre and apostolic pro-nuncio to Japan. He became the highest-ranking German in the diplomatic service and the first German citizen with the rank of nuncio. He received his episcopal consecration on 11 December 1966 in Cologne Cathedral from the Archbishop of Cologne, Cardinal Joseph Frings.

On 19 December 1973, Pope Paul appointed him apostolic delegate to Guinea and Togo and apostolic pro-nuncio to Ivory Coast, Dahomey, and Benin.

On 17 January 1979, Pope John Paul II appointed him apostolic pro-nuncio to the Netherlands. There he had a difficult relationship at times for his less than diplomatic handling of the appointment of a bishop.

Even early in his career Wüstenberg lived a stylish life; he belonged to Rome’s best golf club and drove a Porsche. He anticipated continued social adventures when posted abroad, enjoying the social advantages available in Catholic Tokyo, befriending President Felix Houphouët-Boigny in the Ivory Coast, hiring a private band, using the son of Italian most fashionable architect to build a chapel and his own residence.

In 1984, Wüstenberg died in Freiburg im Breisgau as a result of embolism. He was buried in the cemetery at Cologne Cathedral.
