= Apostolic Nunciature to Benin =

Diplomatic post of the Holy See

The Apostolic Nunciature to Benin is the diplomatic mission of the Holy See to Benin. The Apostolic Nuncio to Benin is an ecclesiastical office of the Catholic Church in Benin, with the rank of an ambassador. The nuncio serves both as the ambassador of the Holy See to the Republic of Benin and as the point-of-contact between the Catholic hierarchy in Benin and the pope.

In 1948, the Holy See established the office of Delegate to Dakar to represent its interest in French colonial Africa. Following the decolonization of the region, the title of that position was changed to Apostolic Delegate to Western Africa on 23 September 1960 and given responsibility for Senegal, Upper Volta, Côte d'Ivoire, Dahomey (Benin), Guinea, Mauritania, Niger, Sudan, Togo, Ghana, Gambia, and Sierra Leone. Over the next decade, as the Vatican established relationships with individual countries, country-specific offices were created, including the Pro-Nunciature to Dahomey in 1972. The name of the country, and of the Holy See's office, changed from Dahomey to Benin on 30 November 1975.

The Apostolic Nuncio to Benin is usually also the Apostolic Nuncio to Togo upon his appointment to said nation.

== List of papal representatives to Benin ==
Apostolic Pro-Nuncios

- Giovanni Mariani (29 March 1972 – 1973)
- Bruno Wüstenberg (29 December 1973 – 17 January 1979)
- Giuseppe Ferraioli (25 August 1979 – 21 July 1981)
- Ivan Dias (8 May 1982 – 20 June 1987)
- Giuseppe Bertello (17 October 1987 – 12 January 1991)
- Abraham Kattumana (8 May 1991 – 16 December 1992)

Apostolic Nuncios

- André Dupuy (6 April 1993 – 27 November 1999)
- Pierre Nguyên Van Tot (25 November 2002 – 24 August 2005)
- Michael August Blume (24 August 2005 – 2 February 2013)
- Brian Udaigwe (8 April 2013 – 13 June 2020)
- Mark Miles (5 February 2021 – 9 July 2024)
- Rubén Darío Ruiz Mainardi (28 October 2024 – present)
