= Rusticiana =

Roman city; Catholic titular see

Bishop of Rusticiana
- Bishopric

catholic
- Incumbent: Pierre Nguyên Van Tot

Information
- First holder: Angel Adolfo Polachini Rodriguez
- Established: 30 November 1966

The city of Rusticiana was located in the Roman province of Numidia (modern Algeria and parts of Tunisia and Libya). Its location and the corresponding modern city are unknown.

== Ecclesiastical history ==
Two bishops of the ancient diocese are known. Leonatist a donatist who took part in the Carthage conference of 411 and the Bishop Donato who was exiled by the Vandal king Huneric after he attended the synod in Carthage of 484, after which he was exiled.

The Catholic titular see of Rusticiana was established in 1933. It has had six post holders, with the most recent being the current post holder Archbishop Pierre Nguyên Van Tot.

== List of the Titular Bishops of Rusticiana ==
Roman Catholic Titular Bishops of Rusticiana
From	Until	Incumbent	Notes
1966	1971	Angel Adolfo Polachini Rodriguez	Titular see given with elevation to Prelate of San Fernando de Apure. Left post with appointment as Bishop of Guanare.
1973	1978	Horacio Alberto Bózzoli	Titular see given with elevation to Auxiliary Bishop of San Martín. Left post with appointment as Bishop of San Miguel.
1979	1984	John Joseph Nevins	Titular see given with elevation to Auxiliary Bishop of Miami. Left post with appointment as Bishop of Venice in Florida.
1985	2000	Álvaro Corrada del Río	Titular see given with elevation to Auxiliary Bishop of Washington. Left post with appointment as Bishop of Tyler.
2001	2002	Arthur Roche	Titular see given with elevation to Auxiliary Bishop of Westminster. Left post with appointment as Coadjutor Bishop of Leeds.
2002	Present	Pierre Nguyên Van Tot	Titular see given with elevation to Archbishop and appointed Apostolic Nuncio to Benin.
