= Michael A. Blume =

American prelate of the Catholic Church

His Excellency, The Most Reverend Michael August Blume S.V.D.
- Apostolic Nuncio emeritus of Hungary; Titular Archbishop of Alexanum
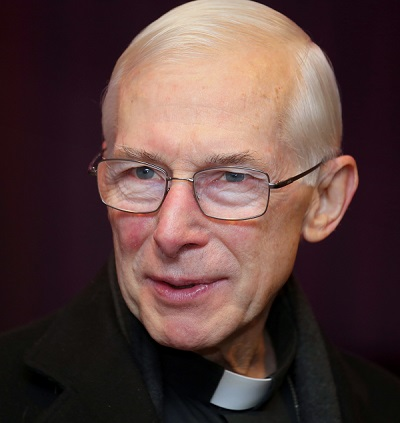
- Appointed: July 4, 2018
- Retired: December 31, 2021
- Predecessor: Alberto Bottari de Castello
- Successor: Michael Banach
- Other post: Titular Archbishop of Alexanum
- Previous posts: Apostolic Nuncio to Uganda (2013–2018); Apostolic Nuncio to Benin and to Togo (2005–2013)

Orders
- Ordination: December 23, 1972 by Joseph Robert Crowley
- Consecration: September 30, 2005 by Angelo Sodano

Personal details
- Born: May 30, 1946 (age 80) South Bend, Indiana, US
- Motto: Verbum Dei Currat (The word of God runs)

Styles of Michael August Blume
- Reference style: His Excellency; The Most Reverend
- Spoken style: Your Excellency
- Religious style: Archbishop

Michael August Blume (born May 30, 1946) is an American prelate of the Catholic Church who worked in the Roman Curia from 1995 to 2005 and then in the diplomatic service of the Holy See as an Apostolic Nuncio until retiring at the end of 2021.

== Biography ==
Michael August Blume was born on August 30, 1946, in South Bend, Indiana. A member of the Society of the Divine Word, he was ordained a priest on December 23, 1972, by Auxiliary Bishop Joseph Crowley in the Diocese of Fort Wayne-South Bend, Indiana.

Blume earned a bachelor's degree in mathematics and a theology degree at the Pontifical Gregorian University. From 1975 to 1983 he taught theology at the regional seminary in Cape Coast, Ghana. From 1983 to 1990 he was provincial of the Society of the Divine Word in Ghana, Benin, and Togo, and secretary general of the Society from 1990 to 1994.

On April 8, 2000, Blume was named under secretary of the Pontifical Council for the Pastoral Care of Migrants and Itinerants, having founded its press service in April 1995.

== Diplomatic career ==
On August 24, 2005, Pope Benedict XVI appointed him titular archbishop of Alexanum and apostolic nuncio to both Benin and Togo. He was consecrated a bishop on September 30, 2005, by Cardinal Angelo Sodano, Vatican secretary of state. Pope Benedict appointed him apostolic nuncio to Uganda on February 2, 2013.

Pope Francis named him apostolic nuncio to Hungary on July 4, 2018, and accepted his resignation on 31 December 2021.

== See also ==
- List of heads of the diplomatic missions of the Holy See
