= Apostolic Nunciature to Costa Rica =

Diplomatic Mission of the Holy See in Costa Rica

- Location: San José, Costa Rica.
- Address: Bv. Ernesto Rohrmoser, Nunciatura, San José, Costa Rica.
- Coordinates: 9°56′21.8″N 84°06′38.2″W
- Apostolic Nuncio: Archbishop Mark Miles

The Apostolic Nunciature to Costa Rica is the diplomatic mission of the Holy See to Costa Rica. It is located in San José. The current Apostolic Nuncio is Archbishop Mark Miles, who was named to the position by Pope Francis on 9 July 2024.

The Apostolic Nunciature to the Republic of Costa Rica is an ecclesiastical office of the Catholic Church in Costa Rica, with the rank of an embassy. The nuncio serves both as the ambassador of the Holy See to the President of Costa Rica, and as delegate and point-of-contact between the Catholic hierarchy in Costa Rica and the Pope.

== Papal representatives to Costa Rica ==
Apostolic Delegates and Internuncios

- Giovanni Cagliero, S.D.B. (10 June 1908 – 6 December 1915)
- Giovanni Battista Marenco, S.D.B. (2 February 1917 – 22 October 1921)
- Angelo Rotta (16 October 1922 (Note: The Internunciature to Central America then covered Costa Rica, El Salvador, Honduras, and Nicaragua.) – 9 May 1925)
- Giuseppe Fietta (27 February 1926 – 23 September 1930)
- Carlo Chiarlo (28 January 1932 – 1940)

Apostolic Nuncios

- Luigi Centoz (3 December 1941 - 26 April 1952)
- Paul Bernier (7 August 1952 - 21 May 1955)
- Giuseppe Maria Sensi (21 May 1955 - 12 January 1957)
- Gennaro Verolino (25 February 1957 - 2 March 1963)
- Paolino Limongi (15 August 1963 - 9 July 1969)
- Angelo Pedroni (19 July 1969 - 15 March 1975)
- Lajos Kada (20 June 1975 - 8 April 1984)
- Pier Giacomo De Nicolò (14 August 1984 - 11 February 1993)
- Giacinto Berloco (17 July 1993 - 5 May 1998)
- Antonio Sozzo (23 May 1998 - 17 July 2003)
- Osvaldo Padilla (31 July 2003 - 12 April 2008)
- Pierre Nguyên Van Tot (13 May 2008 - 22 March 2014)
- Antonio Arcari (5 July 2014 – 25 May 2019)
- Bruno Musarò (29 August 2019 – 11 July 2023)
- Mark Miles (9 July 2024 – present)
