= Apostolic Nunciature to Uganda =

Diplomatic mission of the Holy See in Africa

The Apostolic Nunciature to Uganda is an ecclesiastical office of the Catholic Church in Uganda. It is a diplomatic post of the Holy See, whose representative is called the Apostolic Nuncio with the rank of an ambassador.

== List of papal representatives ==
Apostolic Pro-Nuncios

- Amelio Poggi (5 August 1967 - 27 November 1969)
- Luigi Bellotti (27 November 1969 - 2 September 1975)
- Henri Lemaître (19 December 1975 - 16 November 1981)
- Karl-Josef Rauber (18 December 1982 - 22 January 1990)
- Luis Robles Díaz (13 March 1990 - 6 March 1999)

Apostolic Nuncios

- Christophe Pierre (10 May 1999 - 22 March 2007)
- Paul Tschang In-Nam (27 August 2007 - 4 August 2012)
- Michael August Blume (2 February 2013 - 4 July 2018)
- Luigi Bianco (4 February 2019 - 20 May 2025)
- Tomasz Grysa (14 May 2026 - present)
