= Mario Giardini =

Italian prelate

Mario Giardini B.
- Archbishop of Ancona e Numana
- Church: Catholic Church
- Archdiocese: Archdiocese of Ancona e Numana
- In office: 16 May 1931 – 5 February 1940
- Predecessor: Giovanni Battista Ricci
- Successor: Marco Giovanni Della Pietra
- Other post: Titular Archbishop of Laodicea in Syria (1940-1947)
- Previous posts: Titular Archbishop of Edessa in Osrhoëne (1921-1931); Apostolic Delegate to Japan (1921-1931)

Orders
- Ordination: 24 September 1904 by Andrea Carlo Ferrari
- Consecration: 8 December 1921 by Willem Marinus van Rossum

Personal details
- Born: 4 December 1877 Milan, Province of Milan, Kingdom of Italy
- Died: 30 August 1947 (aged 69)

Mario Giardini (4 December 1877 – 30 August 1947) was an Italian prelate of the Catholic Church who served in the diplomatic service of the Holy See from 1918 to 1933.

== Biography ==
Mario Giardini was born on 4 December 1877 in Milan. He was ordained a priest on 24 September 1904. He was a member of the Barnabites and early in his career worked as a parish priest and master of novices for his order.

On 21 November 1921, Pope Pius XI named him titular archbishop of Edessa and Apostolic Delegate to Japan. He received his episcopal consecration on 8 December 1921 from Cardinal Andrea Carlo Ferrari. He called a provincial synod to address the question of Catholic participation in Shinto ceremonies and the first Japanese bishop, Januarius Kyunosuke Hayasaka, was appointed in 1926. Both were steps in the local hierarchy gaining its independence from the Paris Foreign Missions Society. Negotiations toward the establishment of diplomatic relations made progress but were blocked by Buddhist opposition in parliament. When his successor, Edward Mooney, was appointed on 30 March 1931, Giardino remained in Japan until Mooney arrived from India and then remained for ten days to share information.

On 16 May 1931, Pope Pius XI appointed him Archbishop of Ancona e Numana. (Note: One study of fascist activity in Ancona in the 1930s describes Guardini as "weak and accommodating" (debole e accomodante).) He retired from this position on 5 February 1940. (Note: He was named titular archbishop of Laodicea in Syria on 5 February 1940, standard procedure at the time for retiring ordinaries.) He continued to work reviewing clergy for the Vicariate of Rome.

He died on 30 August 1947 at the age of 69.
