= Jain Mendez =

Monsignor Jain Mendez
- Permanent Observer of the Holy See to UNWTO
- Appointed: 1 September 2025
- Predecessor: Maurizio Bravi

Orders
- Ordination: 29 January 1992 by Cornelius Elanjikal

Personal details
- Born: India

Jain Mendez is an Indian prelate of the Catholic Church who works in the diplomatic service of the Holy See.

== Biography ==
Mendez was ordained a priest for the Archdiocese of Verapoly on 29 January 1992.

== Diplomatic career ==
Mendez served at apostolic nunciatures in Uganda, Panama, Uruguay, the Philippines, Guatemala, Sengal, Lebanon, the Netherlands, Germany and the Dominican Republic.

On 1 September 2025, Pope Leo XIV appointed him Permanent Observer of the Holy See to the World Tourism Organization in Madrid.

== See also ==
- List of heads of the diplomatic missions of the Holy See
