= Abraham Kattumana =

Roman Catholic archbishop (1944–1995)

His Grace Archbishop Abraham Kattumana Archbishop
- Pontifical Delegate to Syro-Malabar Catholic Church
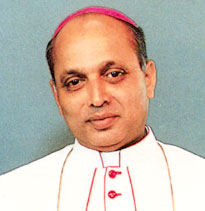
- Province: Ecclesiastical province of Ernakulam-Angamaly
- Diocese: Ernakulam-Angamaly
- See: Cebarades

Orders
- Ordination: 3 May 1969
- Consecration: 3 August 1991
- Rank: Archbishop

Personal details
- Born: 21 January 1944 Vaikom, Travancore
- Died: 4 April 1995 (aged 51) Rome, Italy
- Buried: St. Mary's Cathedral Basilica, Ernakulam
- Denomination: Catholic Syro-Malabar Catholic Church
- Parents: George Kattumana, Marykutty George Thuruthumaliyil.
- Education: Pontifical Urban University, de Propaganda Fide, Pontifical Ecclesiastical Academy, Rome

Abraham Kattumana (21 January 1944 – 4 April 1995) was an Indian Catholic Archbishop. He was the Pontifical Delegate of Syro-Malabar Catholic Church with the powers of the Major Archbishop vested in him by Pope John Paul II. Previously, he had served as apostolic nuncio to Ghana, Benin, and Togo. He was a Vatican diplomat and served at the Nunciatures in Indonesia, Uruguay, Iraq, New Zealand and Great Britain.

== Early life and ordination ==
Abraham Kattumana was born to George Kattumana and Marykutty George Thuruthumaliyil at Thottakam, Vaikom. After completing SSLC he joined the Sacred Heart Minor Seminary of the Archdiocese of Ernakulam on 13 June 1960. He began his philosophy studies at St Joseph's Pontifical Seminary at Alwaye in 1962. After three months he was sent to Rome for continuing the studies. From 1962 to 1969 he studied at the Pontifical Urban University and took master's degree in philosophy and theology. The young Abraham was ordained priest on 3 May 1969 in Rome by Cardinal Joseph Parecattil. Later Fr. Kattumana joined the Pontifical Ecclesiastical Academy, Rome (1969 Batch) where Vatican Diplomats are trained. In the meantime he obtained also a doctorate in Canon Law from Pontifical Urban University, Rome.

== Vatican diplomat ==
On successful completion of the course at the academy he entered the diplomatic service of the Holy See in 1973. As a Vatican Diplomat he served at the Nunciatures of Indonesia, Uruguay, Iraq, New Zealand and Great Britain.

During his tenure as Pontifical Delegate to the Syro Malabar Catholic Church, the powers of Major Archbishop were vested in him, though the office was held by Mar Antony Padiyara. He died from a massive heart attack during a visit to Rome to submit his observations on the Syro Malabar Church.

== Pro-Nuncio to Ghana, Benin & Togo ==
On 8 May 1991 Fr. Kattumana was elected to the titular see of Cebarades following his appointment as Pro-Nuncio to the African states of Ghana, Benin and Togo and was consecrated bishop on 3 August 1991 at Ernakulam by Cardinal Antony Padiyara.

== Pontifical Delegate to the Syro-Malabar Church ==
In December 1992 Archbishop Kattumana was appointed as Pontifical Delegate to the Syro-Malabar Church when the latter was elevated to Major Archiepiscopal status. Archbishop Kattumana was appointed to "exercise for the duration of his mandate, the functions of pastoral governance proper to the major archbishop." Specifically he had the faculty to convoke and preside over the Synod of Bishops, and to establish the Permanent Synod in the Syro Malabar Catholic Church and the other pastoral and legislative organs of the Church and to invigilate over the functioning of the St Thomas Apostolic Seminary at Vadavathoor, Kottayam.

== Death ==
Archbishop Kattumana had gone to Rome on 30 March 1995 to meet the Pope and the officials of the various Vatican Congregations. While pursuing his mission there he was admitted to the clinic run by the Daughters of St Mary of Leuca in the suburbs of Rome on 3 April afternoon for therapeutic observation, and died of heart failure on 4 April. His body was flown back to Ernakulam on the following day and was buried in St Mary's Basilica, the Cardinal Church of Syro-Malabar Major Archbishop and Metropolitan of Ernakulam. His tomb is beside that of Cardinal Mar Joseph Parecattil, the late Metropolitan of Ernakulam who ordained Mar Abraham Kattumana to priesthood.

Preceded by None	Pontifical Delegate to Syro-Malabar church 1992–1995	Succeeded by None
Preceded by Mar Antony Padiyara	Major Archbishop to Syro-Malabar Church; 1992–1995	Succeeded by Cardinal Mar Antony Padiyara
Preceded by Archbishop Giuseppe Bertello	Pro-Nuncio to Ghana, Benin and Togo; 1991–1992	Succeeded by Archbishop André Dupuy
