= Apostolic Nunciature to the Netherlands =

Diplomatic Mission of the Holy See in the Netherlands

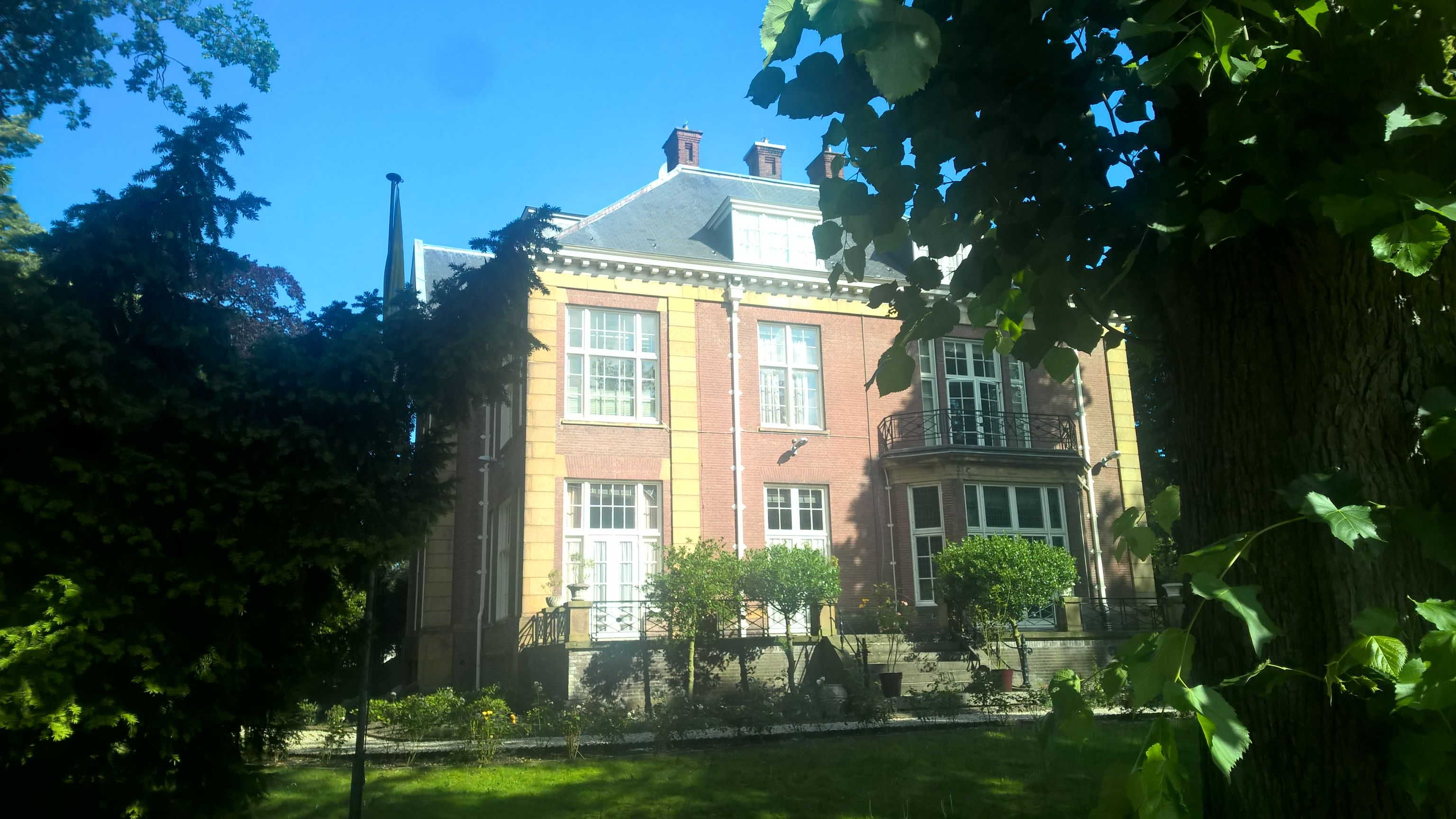
- Location: The Hague, Netherlands
- Address: Carnegielaan 5
- Coordinates: 52°05′15.3″N 4°17′34.5″E
- Apostolic Nuncio: Archbishop Santiago de Wit Guzmán

The Apostolic Nunciature to the Netherlands is the diplomatic mission of the Holy See to the Netherlands. It is located in The Hague. The current Apostolic Nuncio is Archbishop Santiago de Wit Guzmán who was named to the position by Pope Leo XIV on 25 May 2026.

The Apostolic Nunciature to the Kingdom of the Netherlands is an ecclesiastical office of the Catholic Church in the Netherlands, with the rank of an embassy. The nuncio serves both as the ambassador of the Holy See to the King of the Netherlands, and as delegate and point-of-contact between the Catholic hierarchy in the Netherlands and the Pope.

Between 1829 and 1853 (until the promulgation of the bull Ex qua die arcano) the Apostolic Inter-Nuncios to the Netherlands ruled directly the Dutch Mission, the missionary district for the pastoral cure of Catholics in the Northern Netherlands.

== Representatives ==
=== Apostolic Internuncios ===
- Francesco Capaccini (May 1829 – November 1831)
- Carlo Belgrado (12 February 1848 – 28 September 1855)
- Settimio Maria Vecchiotti (23 November 1855 – 16 March 1863)
- Luigi Oreglia di Santo Stefano (16 March 1863 – 4 May 1866)
- Giacomo Cattani (2 May 1866 – 16 March 1868)
- Angelo Bianchi (14 March 1868 – April 1874)
- Giovanni Capri (11 August 1874 – 19 September 1879)
- Agapito Panici (19 September 1879 – 1881)
- Francesco Spolverini (25 April 1882 – 20 July 1887)
- Aristide Rinaldini (11 August 1887 – 31 May 1893)
- Benedetto Lorenzelli (30 May 1893 – 10 October 1896)
- Francesco Tarnassi (24 October 1896 – 1899)
- Giovanni Tacci Porcelli (29 April 1911 – 30 July 1916)
- Achille Locatelli (30 July 1916 – 13 July 1918)
- Sebastiano Nicotra (1 October 1918 – 1921)
- Roberto Vicentini (19 May 1921 – 1922)

=== Apostolic Nuncios ===
- Cesare Orsenigo (23 June 1922 – 2 June 1925)
- Paolo Giobbe (12 August 1935 – 14 November 1959 )
- Giuseppe Beltrami (31 January 1959 – 22 July 1967 )
- Angelo Felici (22 July 1967 – 13 May 1976)
- John Gordon (11 June 1976 – 1978)
- Bruno Wüstenberg (17 January 1979 – 31 May 1984)
- Edward Idris Cassidy (6 November 1984 – 23 March 1988)
- Audrys Juozas Bačkis (5 August 1988 – 24 December 1991)
- Henri Lemaître (28 March 1992 – 8 February 1997)
- Angelo Acerbi (8 February 1997 – 27 February 2001)
- François Bacqué (27 February 2001 – 15 December 2011)
- André Dupuy (15 December 2011 – 21 March 2015)
- Aldo Cavalli (21 March 2015 – 27 November 2021)
- Paul Tschang In-Nam (16 July 2022 – 13 February 2025)
- Jean-Marie Speich (12 April 2025 – 21 February 2026)
- Santiago de Wit Guzmán (25 May 2026 – present)

== See also ==
- Diplomatic mission of the Netherlands to the Holy See
- Catholic Church in the Netherlands
