= Apostolic Nunciature to Hungary =

Diplomatic post of the Holy See

The Apostolic Nunciature to Hungary is an ecclesiastical office of the Catholic Church in Hungary. It is a diplomatic post of the Holy See, whose representative is called the Apostolic Nuncio with the rank of an ambassador. The Hungarian nunciature is located in Budapest, Gyimes Street 1-3., H-1126.

== Representatives of the Holy See to Hungary ==
Apostolic nuncios

- Lorenzo Schioppa (10 August 1920 - 3 May 1925)
- Cesare Orsenigo (2 June 1925 - 14 February 1930)
- Angelo Rotta (20 March 1930 - 6 April 1945)
- Angelo Acerbi (28 March 1990 - 8 February 1997)
- Karl-Josef Rauber (25 April 1997 - 22 February 2003)
- Juliusz Janusz (9 April 2003 - 10 February 2011)
- Alberto Bottari de Castello (6 June 2011 - December 2017)
- Michael August Blume (4 July 2018 - 31 December 2021)
- Michael Wallace Banach (3 May 2022 - 14 May 2026)
- Franco Coppola (5 November 2026 - present)

== See also ==
- Foreign relations of the Holy See
- List of diplomatic missions of the Holy See
