= Apostolic Nunciature to Japan =

Diplomatic post of the Holy See

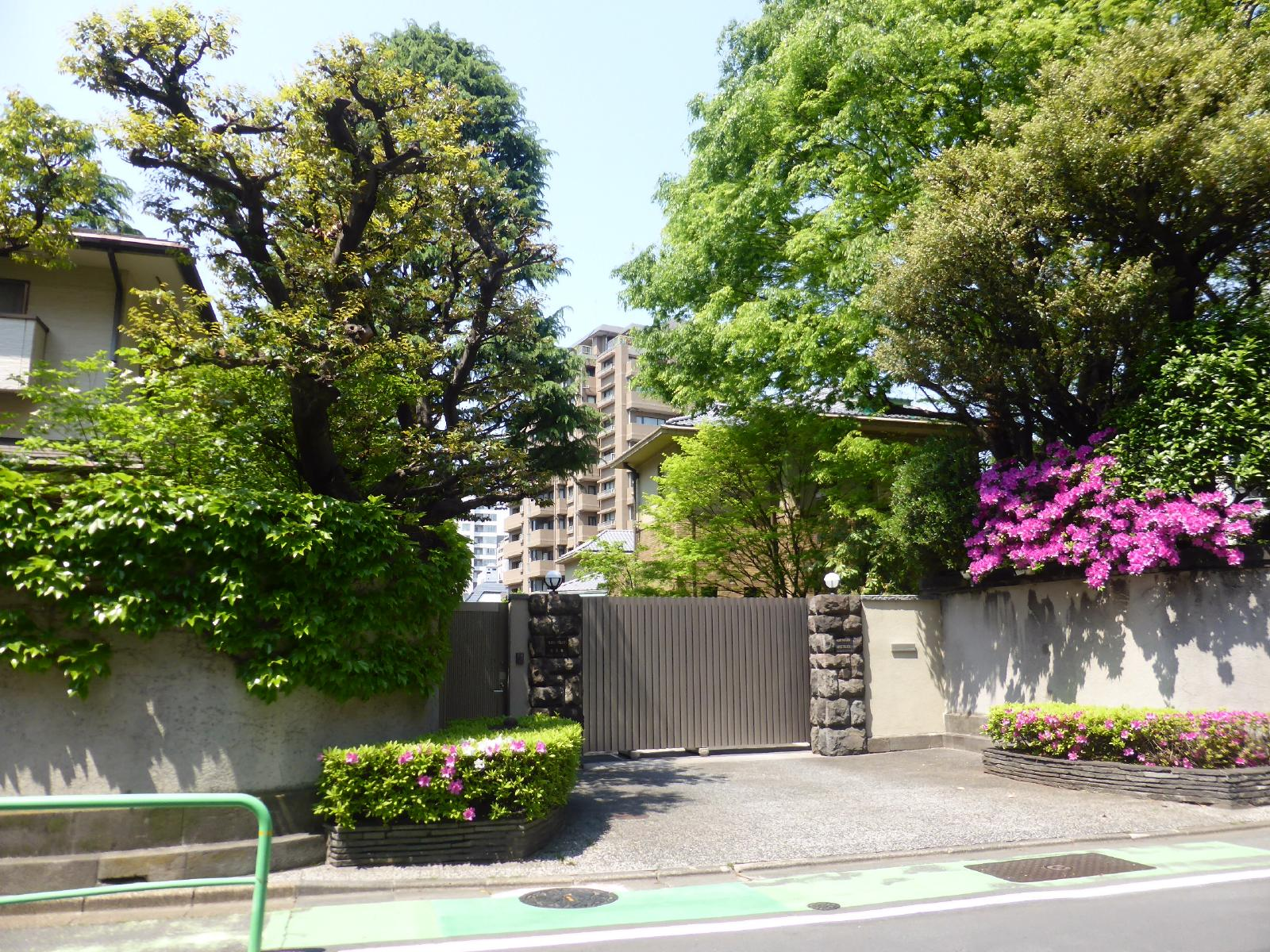
- Location: Tokyo
- Address: 9-2, Sanban-cho, Chiyoda-ku
- Chargé d'affaires: Fabrice Rivet

The Apostolic Nunciature to Japan (Latin: Nuntius Apostolicus in Iaponia, Japanese: 駐日本国ローマ法王庁大使館) is an ecclesiastical office of the Catholic Church in Japan. It is a diplomatic post of the Holy See, whose representative is called the Apostolic Nuncio with the rank of an ambassador.

It originated as the Apostolic Delegation to Japan, erected by Pope Benedict XV on 26 November 1919.

== Papal representatives to Japan ==
=== Apostolic Delegates ===
- Pietro Fumasoni Biondi (26 November 1919 – March 1921)
- Mario Giardini (21 November 1921 – 30 March 1931)
- Edward Aloysius Mooney (30 March 1931 – 28 August 1933)
- Paolo Marella (30 October 1933 – 27 October 1948)
- Maximilien de Fürstenberg (22 March 1949 – 21 November 1959)

=== Apostolic Internuncios ===
- Domenico Enrici (5 January 1960 – 1 October 1962)
- Mario Cagna (13 October 1962 – 17 September 1966)

=== Apostolic Pro-Nuncios ===
- Bruno Wüstenberg (24 October 1966 – 19 December 1973)
- Ippolito Rotoli (10 January 1974 – 4 October 1977)
- Mario Pio Gaspari (16 November 1977 – 23 June 1983)
- William Aquin Carew (30 August 1983 – 11 November 1997)

=== Apostolic Nuncios ===
- Ambrose De Paoli (11 November 1997 – 18 December 2004)
- Alberto Bottari de Castello (1 April 2005 – 6 June 2011)
- †Joseph Chennoth (15 August 2011 – 8 September 2020, died in office)
  - Većeslav Tumir (chargés d'affaires ad interim, 8 September 2020 – 11 March 2021)
- Leo Boccardi (11 March 2021 – 1 September 2023)
  - Fabrice Rivet (chargés d'affaires ad interim, September 2023 – )
- Francisco Escalante Molina (25 January 2024 – present)

== See also ==
- Foreign relations of the Holy See
- List of diplomatic missions of the Holy See
