= Apostolic Nunciature to Monaco =

Diplomatic post of the Holy See

The Apostolic Nuncio to Monaco is the representative of the Pope and the Holy See to the Principality of Monaco.

== History ==
The Holy See has only maintained a diplomatic legation in Monaco since 2006. The appointment of a papal diplomatic representative to the Principality was subsequent to the revision of Monaco's treaty with France which was revised in 2002 and ratified in 2005.

This revised treaty granted the Principality the sovereign prerogative of establishing formal diplomatic relations with other sovereign states at the highest diplomatic level, that of ambassador extraordinary and plenipotentiary—for the Holy See this means at the level of nuncio, i.e., that of an apostolic nunciatures headed by an apostolic nuncio (apostolic nuncios normally hold the ecclesiastical rank of archbishop).

The first apostolic nuncio to represent the Holy See to Monaco, with residence and coterminous accreditation to the EU in Brussels, was Archbishop André Dupuy.

== Nuncios to Monaco ==
- André Dupuy (11 July 2006 – 15 December 2011)
- Luigi Travaglino (8 September 2012 – 16 January 2016)
- Luigi Pezzuto (16 January 2016 – 25 May 2019)
- Antonio Arcari (25 May 2019 – 16 May 2023)
- Martin Krebs (19 April 2024 – present)
