= Giuseppe Ferraioli =

Italian prelate

Giuseppe Ferraioli (20 December 1929 – 31 January 2000) was an Italian prelate of the Catholic Church who worked in the diplomatic service of the Holy See.

== Biography ==
Giuseppe Ferraioli was born on 20 December 1929 in Rome. He was ordained a priest on 8 December 1954.

To prepare for a diplomat’s career he entered the Pontifical Ecclesiastical Academy in 1957.

On 16 June 1976, Pope Paul VI named him Apostolic Pro-nuncio to Ghana.

Cardinal Secretary of State Jean-Marie Villot consecrated him a bishop on 27 June.

On 25 August 1979, Ferraioli was given the additional responsibilities of Apostolic Pro-Nuncio to Benin and Apostolic Delegate to Togo.

Pope John Paul II appointed him Apostolic Pro-Nuncio to Kenya on 21 July 1981.

In 1982 Ferraioli took up a post in Rome at the Secretariat of State. He resigned in 1994 at the age of 64.

He died on 31 January 2000.
