= Peter Paul Prabhu =

Peter Paul Prabhu (20 March 1931 − 10 September 2013) was an Indian Roman Catholic archbishop and diplomat.

Born in Chennai, India, Prabhu was ordained to the priesthood on 20 December 1954 for the Roman Catholic Archdiocese of Madras and Mylapore, India. On 13 November 1993, he was appointed titular archbishop of Tituli in Numidia and was consecrated on 6 January 1994. He was also appointed nuncio to Zimbabwe and resigned on 1 July 2002.
