= Apostolic Nunciature to Guinea =

Diplomatic post of the Holy See

The Apostolic Nunciature to Guinea is the diplomatic mission of the Holy See to Guinea. The Apostolic Nuncio to Guinea is an ecclesiastical office of the Catholic Church in Guinea, with the rank of an ambassador. The nuncio serves both as the ambassador of the Holy See to the Republic of Guinea and as the point-of-contact between the Catholic hierarchy in Guinea and the pope.

In 1948, the Holy See established the Delegation to Dakar led by Marcel-François Lefebvre to represent its interests in French colonial Africa. Following the decolonization of the region, the title of that position was changed to Apostolic Delegate to Western Africa on 23 September 1960 and given responsibility for Senegal, Upper Volta, Côte d'Ivoire, Dahomey (Benin), Guinea, Mauritania, Niger, Sudan, Togo, Ghana, Gambia, and Sierra Leone. Over the next decade, as the Vatican established relationships with individual countries, country-specific offices were created, including the Delegations to Guinea, Togo, Mali, and Mauritania on 21 May 1973.

The Apostolic Nuncio to Guinea is usually also the Apostolic Nuncio to Mali upon his appointment to said nation.

== List of papal representatives to Guinea ==
Apostolic Delegates

- Bruno Wüstenberg (20 December 1973 – 17 January 1979)
- Johannes Dyba (25 August 1979 – 1 June 1983)
- Romeo Panciroli (6 November 1984 – 18 March 1992)

Apostolic Pro-Nuncios

- Luigi Travaglino (4 April 1992 – 2 May 1995)

Apostolic Nuncios

- Antonio Lucibello (8 September 1995 – 27 July 1999)
- Alberto Bottari de Castello (18 December 1999 – 1 April 2005)
- George Antonysamy (4 August 2005 – 8 September 2008)
- Martin Krebs (8 September 2008 – 8 May 2013)
- Santo Rocco Gangemi (6 November 2013 – 25 May 2018)
- Tymon Tytus Chmielecki (26 March 2019 – 12 November 2022)
- Jean-Sylvain Emien Mambé (12 November 2022 – present)

== See also ==
- List of diplomatic missions in Guinea
