= Kraszewice =

Kraszewice may refer to the Following places in Poland:

- Gmina Kraszewice
- Kraszewice, Greater Poland Voivodeship
- Kraszewice, Łódź Voivodeship
