= Pierre Nguyên Van Tot =

Vietnamese prelate

His Excellency, The Most Reverend Pierre Nguyên Van Tot
- Apostolic Nuncio Emeritus of Sri Lanka
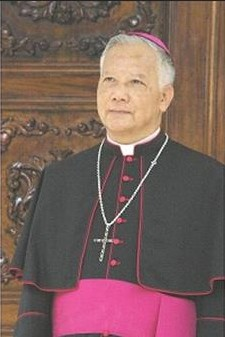
- Native name: Phêrô Nguyễn Văn Tốt
- Appointed: 22 March 2014
- Retired: 2 January 2020
- Predecessor: Joseph Spiteri
- Successor: Brian Udaigwe
- Other post: Titular Archbishop of Rusticiana (2003 - )
- Previous posts: Apostolic Nuncio of Costa Rica (2008-2014); Apostolic Nuncio of Chad and Central African Republic (2005-2008); Apostolic Nuncio of Benin and Togo (2002-2005)

Orders
- Ordination: 24 March 1974 by Agnelo Rossi
- Consecration: 6 January 2003 by John Paul II, Leonardo Sandri, and Antonio Maria Vegliò

Personal details
- Born: April 15, 1949 (age 77) Thủ Dầu Một, Bình Dương Province, Vietnam
- Motto: Docete omnes gentes (Preach to all nations) (Rao giảng cho muôn dân)

Styles of Pierre Nguyên Van Tot
- Reference style: His Excellency; The Most Reverend
- Spoken style: Your Excellency
- Religious style: Archbishop

Pierre Nguyên Van Tot (born 15 April 1949) is a Vietnamese prelate of the Catholic Church and a former diplomat of the Holy See; most recently as apostolic nuncio to Sri Lanka from 2014 to 2020.

== Biography ==
Nguyễn Văn Tốt was born on 15 April 1949 in Thủ Dầu Một, Bình Dương Province, Vietnam. He was ordained a priest of the Diocese of Phú Cường on 24 March 1974.

== Diplomatic career ==
Nguyen joined the diplomatic service of the Holy See on 1 May 1985 and fulfilled assignments in Panama, Brazil, Zaire, Rwanda, and France. He became chargé d’affaires in Benin on 27 November 1999. He earned a degree from the Pontifical Urban University in 1987.

On 25 November 2002, Pope John Paul II appointed him the titular archbishop of Rusticiana and apostolic nuncio to Benin and Togo. He received his episcopal consecration from Pope John Paul on 6 January 2003.

On 24 August 2005, Pope Benedict XVI named him Apostolic Nuncio to Chad and the Central African Republic. Pope Benedict appointed him Nuncio to Costa Rica on 13 May 2008.

On 22 March 2014, Pope Francis appointed him Apostolic Nuncio to Sri Lanka. Pope Francis accepted Nguyen's resignation on 2 January 2020.

== Writings ==
- Le bouddha et le Christ: Parallèles et ressemblances dans la littérature canonique et apocryphe chrétienne (in French). Urbaniana University Press. 1987. ISBN 8840132848.

== See also ==
- List of heads of the diplomatic missions of the Holy See
