= André Dupuy =

French archbishop

His Excellency, The Most Reverend André Dupuy
- Apostolic Nuncio emeritus of Netherlands; Titular Archbishop of Selsea
- Appointed: 15 December 2011
- Retired: 21 March 2015
- Predecessor: François Bacqué
- Successor: Aldo Cavalli
- Other post: Titular Archbishop of Selsea
- Previous posts: Apostolic Nuncio of Monaco (2006-2011); Apostolic Nuncio of European Union (2005-2011); Apostolic Nuncio of Venezuela (2000-2005); Apostolic Nuncio of Benin, Ghana and Togo (1993-2000)

Orders
- Ordination: 8 July 1972
- Consecration: 6 June 1993 by Angelo Sodano, Robert Pierre Sarrabère, and Gérard Daucourt

Personal details
- Born: February 13, 1940 (age 86) Soustons, Landes, France

Styles of André Dupuy
- Reference style: His Excellency; The Most Reverend
- Spoken style: Your Excellency
- Religious style: Archbishop

André Pierre Louis Dupuy (French: [ɑ̃dʀe pjɛʀ lwi dypɥi]; born 13 February 1940) is a French prelate of the Catholic Church who worked in the diplomatic service of the Holy See from 1974 to 2015.

== Biography ==
André Pierre Louis Dupuy was born on 13 February 1940 in Soustons, Landes. He was ordained a priest of the Diocese of Aire and Dax on 8 July 1972. He studied in Bordeaux, Dax and Rome, earning a doctorate in history.

== Diplomatic career ==
He entered the diplomatic service of the Holy See and between 1974 and 1991 fulfilled assignments in Venezuela, Tanzania, the Netherlands, Lebanon, Iran and Ireland. He worked at Permanent Mission of the Holy See to the United Nations in New York from 1991 to 1993.

On 6 April 1993, Pope John Paul II appointed him Titular Archbishop of Selsea and Apostolic Nuncio to Ghana, Benin, and Togo. He received his episcopal consecration in Dax on 6 June from Cardinal Angelo Sodano, Secretary of State.

He resigned as Apostolic Nuncio to Benin on 27 November 1999. (Note: This resignation is reported without explanation by two self-published websites. The Vatican announcement of his next assignment in 2000 identifies him as the nuncio to Ghana and Togo only.)

On 27 March 2000, John Paul named him Nuncio to Venezuela. While in that post, he edited a collection of excerpts from more than 1300 speeches delivered by representatives of the Holy See to international organizations between 1970 and 2000. It appeared in 2003 as Words That Matter. He described it as "a work instrument meant for experts in international law, a text for diplomats to consult and for whoever wishes to better know the Holy See's position on certain international questions".

Pope Benedict XVI named him Nuncio to the European Community on 24 February 2005, adding the role of Nuncio to Monaco on 11 July 2006. He was the first to hold the title of Nuncio to Monaco.

On 15 December 2011, Benedict appointed him Nuncio to the Netherlands.

His career as an apostolic nuncio ended with the appointment of his successor as nuncio to the Netherlands, Aldo Cavalli, on 21 March 2015.

== Writings ==
- La Diplomatie du Saint-Siège après le 2e Concile du Vatican : le pontificat de Paul VI, 1963-1978 (in French). 1980.

== See also ==
- List of heads of the diplomatic missions of the Holy See
