= Pontifical Ecclesiastical Academy =

Roman College of the Catholic Church

Coordinates: 41°53′53″N 12°28′38″E

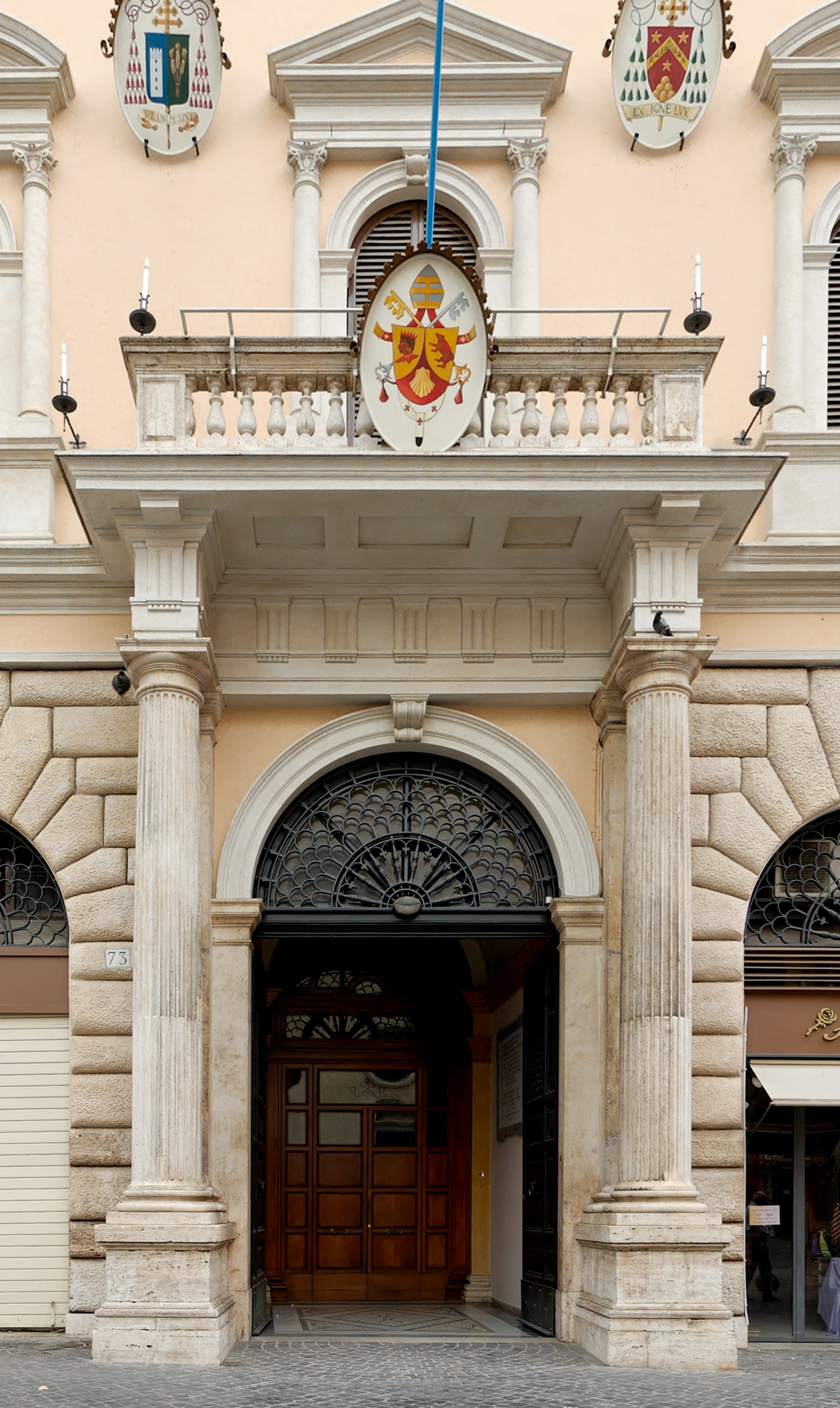
The entrance of the Pontificia Accademia Ecclesiastica. The coat of arms on the left is that of Cardinal Sodano, Cardinal Protector of the PEA.

The Pontifical Ecclesiastical Academy (Latin: Pontificia Ecclesiastica Academia, Italian: Pontificia Accademia Ecclesiastica) is one of the Roman Colleges of the Catholic Church. The academy is dedicated to training priests to serve in the diplomatic corps and the Secretariat of State of the Holy See.

Despite its name, the Pontifical Ecclesiastical Academy is not one of the ten Pontifical Academies of the Holy See.

The patron of the Pontifical Ecclesiastical Academy is Saint Anthony the Great.

== History ==
The diplomatic service of the Holy See can be traced back to 325 AD when Pope Sylvester I sent legates to represent him at the First Council of Nicaea. The academy was created as the Pontifical Academy for Noble Ecclesiastics in 1701 by Abbot Pietro Garagni, in close collaboration with Blessed Sebastian Valfrè of the Turin Oratory. The current name was given by Pope Pius XI (c. 1930).

== Function ==
Located inside Palazzo Severoli on the Piazza della Minerva in central Rome, the Pontifical Ecclesiastical Academy trains Catholic priests sent by their bishop from different parts of the world to study ecclesiastical and international diplomacy, particularly in order that the alumni may later be selected to serve in the Diplomatic posts of the Holy See—ultimately as a papal nuncio, or ambassador. Many leaders of the church have been alumni of the academy, including Popes Clement XIII, Leo XII, Leo XIII, Benedict XV, and Paul VI.

Students spend four years at the academy; three years earning a licentiate in canon law (J.C.L.) from a Pontifical University, then two years earning a doctorate in canon law (J.C.D.) (normally at the Pontifical Lateran University). If the students that have been recruited already have a J.C.D. then their time at the PEA is shortened to two years. The courses are usually in diplomatic history, languages and diplomatic writing and are considered not to be academic, but rather focus on the practical skills needed to serve as a diplomat. By the end of his studies, each student has to possess a working knowledge of at least two languages in addition to his mother tongue.

Revised requirements for those who enter the Academy beginning in 2020/2021 include a year of pastoral work in a missionary context.

Each year between 30 and 35 priests are chosen by the Secretariat of State to begin their studies. Between 10 and 12 priests complete the course and enter the Vatican diplomatic service each year.

The President of the academy is Archbishop Joseph Marino, who was previously Apostolic Nuncio to Malaysia, East Timor, as well as Apostolic Delegate To Brunei. He succeeded Archbishop Giampiero Gloder on 21 October 2019 when Archbishop Golder was named by Pope Francis as Apostolic Nuncio to Cuba.

Georg Gänswein became only the sixth active apostolic nuncio who did not attend the Pontifical Ecclesiastical Academy, the training institute for most members of the diplomatic corps of the Holy See. (Note: The other five are Archbishops Charles J. Brown, Giovanni Pietro Dal Toso, Savio Hon Tai-Fai, Noël Treanor, and Alfred Xuereb.) Claudio Gugerotti is not active but served as nuncio before becoming prefect of the Dicastery for the Eastern Churches.

Michael Fitzgerald and Michael A. Blume have retired but were not PEA graduates.

== Presidents ==
- Matteo Gennaro Sibilia (1701–1704)
- Francesco Giordanini (1704–1720)
- Pellegrino De Negri (1721–1728)
- Tommaso Giannini (1729–1739)
- Girolamo Formaliani (1739–1742)
- Angelo Granelli (1742–1744)
- Pier Matteo Onorati (1744–1762)
- Innocenzo Gorgoni (1763–1764)
- Paolo Antonio Paoli (1775–1798)
- Vincenzo Brenciaglia (1802–1814)
- Giovanni Giacomo Sinibaldi (1814–1843)
- Giovanni Battista Rosani (1843–1847)
- Giuseppe Cardoni (1850–1873)
- Venanzio Mobili (1873–1875)
- Odoardo Agnelli (1875–1878)
- Placido Maria Schiaffino (1878–1884)
- Domenico Ferrata (1884–1885)
- Luigi Sepiacci (1885–1886)
- Francesco Satolli (1888–1891)
- Augusto Guidi (1892–1894)
- Filippo Castracane degli Antelminelli (1895–1898)
- Rafael Merry del Val y Zulueta (1900–1903)
- Francesco Sogaro (1903–1912)
- Giovanni Maria Zonghi (1914–1941)
- Paolo Savino (1941–1959)
- Giacomo Testa (1959–1962)
- Gino Paro (1962–1969)
- Salvatore Pappalardo (1969–1970)
- Felice Pirozzi (1970–1975)
- Domenico Enrici (acting president; 1974–1975)
- Cesare Zacchi (1975–1985)
- Justin Francis Rigali (1985–1989)
- Karl-Josef Rauber (1990–1993)
- Gabriel Montalvo Higuera (1993–1998)
- Georg Zur (1998–2000)
- Justo Mullor García (2000–2007)
- Beniamino Stella (2007–2013)
- Giampiero Gloder (2013–2019)
- Joseph Marino (2019–2023)
- Salvatore Pennacchio (2023–present)

== See also ==
- Global organisation of the Catholic Church
- Index of Vatican City-related articles
