= Nuncio =

Papal ambassador

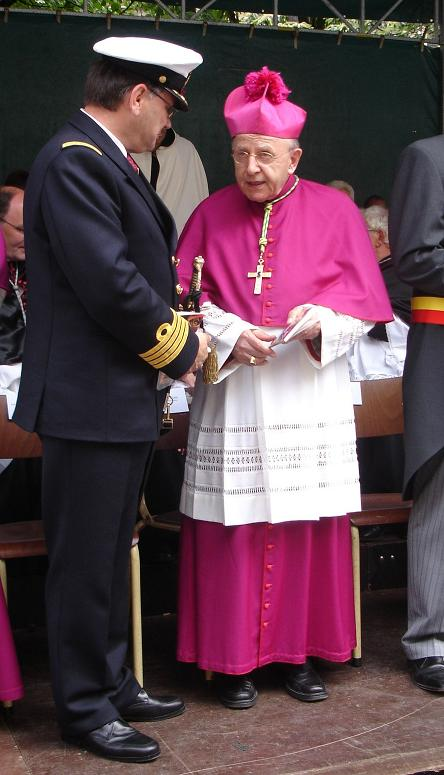
Archbishop Karl-Josef Rauber, former nuncio to Belgium and Luxembourg

An apostolic nuncio (Latin: nuntius apostolicus; also known as a papal nuncio or simply as a nuncio) is an ecclesiastical diplomat whose rank is equal to that of an ambassador, serving as an envoy or a permanent diplomatic representative of the Holy See to a state or to an international organization. A nuncio is appointed by and represents the Holy See, and is the head of the diplomatic mission, called an apostolic nunciature, which is the equivalent of an embassy. The Holy See is legally distinct from the Vatican City or the Catholic Church. In modern times, a nuncio is usually an Archbishop.

An apostolic nuncio is generally equivalent in rank to that of ambassador extraordinary and plenipotentiary, although in Catholic countries the nuncio often ranks above ambassadors in diplomatic protocol. A nuncio performs the same functions as an ambassador and has the same diplomatic privileges. Under the 1961 Vienna Convention on Diplomatic Relations, to which the Holy See is a party, a nuncio is an ambassador like those from any other country. The Vienna Convention allows the host state to grant seniority of precedence to the nuncio over others of ambassadorial rank accredited to the same country, and may grant the deanship of that country's diplomatic corps to the nuncio regardless of seniority. The representative of the Holy See in some situations is called a Delegate or, in the case of the United Nations, Permanent Observer. In the Holy See hierarchy, these usually rank equally to a nuncio, but they do not have formal diplomatic status, though in some countries they have some diplomatic privileges.

In addition, the nuncio serves as the liaison between the Holy See and the Church in that particular nation, supervising the diocesan episcopate (usually a national or multinational conference of bishops which has its own chairman, elected by its members). The nuncio has an important role in the selection of bishops.

== Terminology and history ==
The name "nuncio" derived from the ancient Latin word nuntius, meaning "envoy" or "messenger". Since such envoys are accredited to the Holy See as such and not to the State of Vatican City, the term "nuncio" (versus "ambassador") emphasizes the unique nature of the diplomatic mission. The 1983 Code of Canon Law claims the "innate right" to send and receive delegates independent from interference of non-ecclesiastical civil power. Canon law only recognizes international law limitations on this right.

Article 16 of the Vienna Convention on Diplomatic Relations provides:

1. Heads of mission shall take precedence in their respective classes in the order of the date and time of taking up their functions in accordance with Article 13.
2. Alterations in the credentials of a head of mission not involving any change of class shall not affect his precedence.
3. This article is without prejudice to any practice accepted by the receiving State regarding the precedence of the representative of the Holy See.

In accordance with this article, many states (even not predominantly Catholic ones such as Germany and Switzerland and including the great majority in central and western Europe and in the Americas) give precedence to the nuncio over other diplomatic representatives, according him the position of Dean of the Diplomatic Corps reserved in other countries for the longest-serving resident ambassador.

== Multilateral ==
Holy See representatives called permanent observers are accredited to several international organisations, including offices or agencies of the United Nations, and other organizations either specialized in their mission or regional or both. A permanent observer of the Holy See is always a cleric, often a titular archbishop with the rank of nuncio, but there has been considerable variation between offices and over time.

== Retirement ==
Typically, retirement age is 75. Nuncios have the option of retiring at 70. They are granted this possibility under Article 20 §2 of the Regulations for Pontifical Representations.

== See also ==
- Apostolic nunciature
- Internuncio – a lower rank than Nuncio for a papal diplomatic representative, a title historically used at a time when states sent to some less important countries diplomatic representatives, called Envoys or Ministers, lower in rank than Ambassadors.
- Papal legate
- List of heads of the diplomatic missions of the Holy See
