= Ildebrando Antoniutti =

Italian cardinal (1898–1974)

His Eminence Ildebrando Antoniutti
- Prefect Emeritus of the Congregation for Religious and Secular Institutes
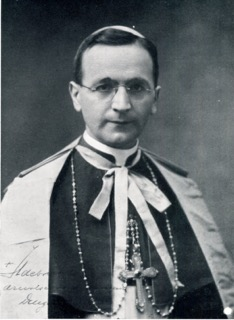
- Church: Roman Catholic Church
- Appointed: 26 July 1963
- Term ended: 13 September 1973
- Predecessor: Valerio Valeri
- Successor: Arturo Tabera Araoz
- Other posts: Cardinal-Bishop of Velletri (1973–74); Camerlengo of the College of Cardinals (1973–74)
- Previous posts: Apostolic Delegate to Albania (1936–38); Titular Archbishop of Synnada in Phrygia (1936–62); Apostolic Delegate to Canada (1938–53); Apostolic Nuncio to Spain (1953–62); Cardinal-Priest of San Sebastiano alle Catacombe (1962–73)

Orders
- Ordination: 5 December 1920 by Antonio Anastasio Rossi
- Consecration: 29 June 1936 by Pietro Fumasoni Biondi
- Created cardinal: 19 March 1962 by Pope John XXIII
- Rank: Cardinal-Priest (1962–73); Cardinal-Bishop (1973–74)

Personal details
- Born: Ildebrando Antoniutti; 3 August 1898 Nimis, Kingdom of Italy
- Died: 1 August 1974 (aged 75) Bologna, Italy
- Buried: Santi Gervasio e Protasio, Udine, Italy
- Parents: Giuseppe Antoniutti; Anna Comelli
- Education: Pontifical Major Roman Seminary; Pontifical Lateran University
- Motto: In lumine Tuo
- Coat of arms

Styles of Ildebrando Antoniutti
- Reference style: His Eminence
- Spoken style: Your Eminence
- Informal style: Cardinal
- See: Velletri-Segni (suburbicarian)

Ildebrando Antoniutti (3 August 1898 – 1 August 1974) was an Italian cardinal of the Roman Catholic Church. He served as prefect of the Congregation for Religious from 1963 to 1973, and was elevated to the cardinalate by Pope John XXIII in 1962.

== Early life and education ==
Antoniutti was born in Nimis, the sixth of the seven children of Giuseppe and Anna (née Comelli) Antoniutti. Studying at the seminaries in Cividale and Udine, he accompanied Archbishop Antonio Anastasio Rossi of Udine during World War I on Rossi's frequent visits to military hospitals and to parishes in areas occupied by Austro-Hungarian forces. In November 1917, Antoniutti went to Rome, where he studied at the Pontifical Roman Seminary and Pontifical Lateran University (from where he obtained his doctorates in philosophy, theology, and canon law in July 1920).

== Ordained ministry ==
He was ordained to the priesthood by Archbishop Rossi on 5 December 1920, and then taught at the Udine seminary from 1921 to 1927, whilst serving as Rossi's private secretary. In 1927, Antoniutti was named secretary of the apostolic delegation to China, under Archbishop Celso Costantini, becoming its auditor in 1930 and later chargé d'affaires ad interim in 1933. He was raised to the rank of Privy Chamberlain of His Holiness on 24 September 1931, and named auditor to the Portuguese nunciature in 1934.

=== Episcopal ministry ===
On 19 May 1936, Antoniutti was appointed Apostolic Delegate to Albania and Titular Archbishop of Synnada in Phrygia by Pope Pius XI. He received his episcopal consecration on the following 29 June from Cardinal Pietro Fumasoni Biondi, with Archbishops Rossi (who by then was Latin Patriarch of Constantinople) and Costantini serving as co-consecrators, in Rome. Remaining as Albania's apostolic delegate until August 1936, Antoniutti served as a papal envoy to Spain during its civil war on 25 July 1937, for the purposes of exchanging of prisoners and providing assistance to priests who had fled from Communist areas. He was named, on the following 21 September chargé d'affaires to the Nationalist government. Antoniutti later became Apostolic Delegate to Canada on 14 July 1938. During his time in Ottawa, he described Maclean's editor Blair Fraser, the father of Graham Fraser, as "badly informed" after he accused conservative clergy of keeping the Church in Canada too old-fashioned in its social principles in an article that the Apostolic Delegate called "evidently tendentious". He also presided over the controversial resignation of Archbishop Joseph Charbonneau.

Antoniutti was named Nuncio to Spain on 21 October 1953, and created Cardinal-Priest of S. Sebastiano alle Catacombe by Pope John XXIII in the consistory of 19 March 1962. From 1962 to 1965, he attended the Second Vatican Council, during the course of which he was one of the cardinal electors who participated in the 1963 papal conclave that elected Pope Paul VI. On 26 July 1963, the newly elected Pope Paul appointed Antoniutti to the Roman Curia, as Prefect of the Congregation for Religious. Cardinal Antoniutti later resigned as Prefect of Religious, after a decade of service, upon becoming Cardinal-Bishop of Velletri-Segni on 13 September 1973. He was named Camerlengo of the College of Cardinals the next year.

== Death ==
Seeking a period of rest in his native Nimis, Antoniutti departed from Rome on 1 August 1974, and was instantly killed when his car hit another vehicle on a bypass of Bologna. His body was moved to Nimis two days later, which would have been his seventy-sixth birthday, for a funeral Mass, which was celebrated by Cardinals Ermenegildo Florit and Albino Luciani, and nine other bishops. Antoniutti is buried at the parish church in Nimis.

== Trivia ==
- During his tenure as Spain's nuncio, Archbishop Antoniutti praised the Cathedral Chapter of Seville for attacking leaflets claiming that he, the Holy See, and Seville's coadjutor José Bueno y Monreal as malicious enemies of Cardinal Pedro Segura y Sáenz.
- Cardinal Antoniutti, seen as a compromise candidate for the papacy by conservative cardinals, is alleged to have received about twenty votes during one of the ballots in the conclave of 1963.
- As Pope Paul VI received the homage of the cardinals following his election, he asked of Antoniutti to "be a brother and a friend to me," to which the Cardinal replied, "I will always be deferent to the pope".

Catholic Church titles
Preceded by Giacomo Ghio	— TITULAR — Bishop of Synnada in Phrygia; 1936–1962	Succeeded by Marcel-François Lefebvre, C.S.Sp.
Preceded by Giovanni Battista della Pietra, SJ	Apostolic Delegate to Albania; 1936–1938	Succeeded by Leone Giovanni Battista Nigris
Preceded by Andrea Cassulo	Apostolic Delegate to Canada and Newfoundland; 1938–1953	Succeeded by Giovanni Panico
Preceded by Gaetano Cicognani	Apostolic Nuncio to Spain; 1953–1963	Succeeded by Antonio Riberi
Preceded by Valerio Valeri	Prefect of the Congregation for Religious; 1953–1963	Succeeded by Arturo Tabera Araoz, CMF
Preceded by Giuseppe Ferretto	Camerlengo of the College of Cardinals; 1974	Succeeded by Franjo Šeper
