= Life Is Worth Living =

1950s American television series

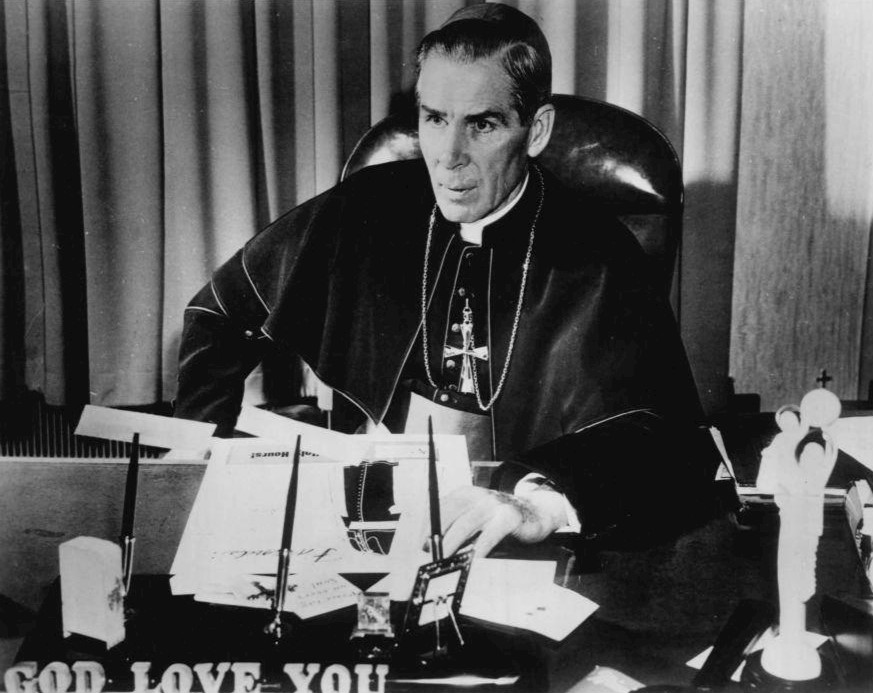
- Bishop Sheen in 1956
- Genre: Religious
- Presented by: Fulton J. Sheen
- Theme music composer: Charles Williams
- Opening theme: Said the Bells
- Country of origin: United States
- Original language: English

Production
- Camera setup: Multi-camera
- Running time: 26 minutes

Original release
- Network: DuMont (1952–1955); ABC (1955–1957)
- Release: February 12, 1952 – April 8, 1957

Life Is Worth Living is an American religious television series that ran on the DuMont Television Network from February 12, 1952, to April 26, 1955, then on ABC until April 8, 1957, featuring Fulton J. Sheen. Similar series, also featuring Sheen, followed in 1958–1961 and 1961–1968.

== Broadcast history ==
Hosted by Bishop (later Archbishop) Fulton J. Sheen, the series consisted of Sheen speaking to the camera and discussing moral issues of the day, often using blackboard drawings and lists to help explain the topic. When the blackboard was filled, Sheen would move to another part of the set, and request one of his "angels" (one of the TV crew) to clean the blackboard.

In 1952, DuMont was searching for programming ideas and tried a rotating series of religious programs hosted by a Protestant minister, a Jewish rabbi, and a Catholic bishop. While the other shows did not catch on, the bishop (Sheen) was a hit, found a sponsor in Admiral television sets, and became DuMont's only Emmy Award winner during its decade of broadcasting. Life Is Worth Living held the distinction of being aired on more stations (169) than any other regularly scheduled DuMont program, and is believed to have been the most widely viewed religious series in the history of television.

Prior to Life Is Worth Living, Sheen had appeared on the radio program The Catholic Hour from 1928 to 1952. With his hypnotic gaze, disarming smile, and dramatic delivery, Sheen was deemed a natural for television. Airing opposite NBC's Milton Berle show on Tuesday nights, Sheen was the only person to be competitive with Berle. Sheen drew as many as 10 million viewers each week.

Sheen and Berle enjoyed a friendly rivalry. Berle is reported to have joked, "We both work for the same boss, 'Sky Chief Supreme'", making reference to a grade of gasoline produced by Texaco, his sponsor. Later, when Sheen won an Emmy, Berle quipped, "He's got better writers – Matthew, Mark, Luke and John!" As a take-off on Berle's nickname "Uncle Miltie," Sheen once opened his program by saying, "Good evening, this is Uncle Fultie."

Sheen became one of early television's most unlikely stars, winning an Emmy Award for "Most Outstanding Television Personality" in 1953. During his acceptance speech he borrowed Berle's line, crediting his four writers – Matthew, Mark, Luke, and John – for his success.

Sheen made famous statements against communism. In 1953 an episode of Life Is Worth Living consisted of a reading of the burial scene from Julius Caesar, with Sheen substituting the names of Stalin, Beria, Malenkov, and Vyshinsky for Caesar, Cassius, Marc Antony, and Brutus. Sheen dramatically stated, "Stalin must one day meet his judgment."

== Network change ==
When DuMont ceased network broadcasting in 1955, Sheen moved his show to ABC, lectured for a while, and returned to television from 1958 to 1961 with The Best of Bishop Sheen on the NTA Film Network. A later syndicated series, titled The Fulton Sheen Program and essentially a revival of Life Is Worth Living, began in 1961. The syndicated version was broadcast on local stations across America until 1968, with the later programs in color. Times had changed, and the 1960s programs did not match the audience of his earlier years.

Sheen, auxiliary Bishop of the Archdiocese of New York since 1951, was appointed Bishop of the Roman Catholic Diocese of Rochester, New York, in 1966 but resigned in 1969 to become titular Archbishop of Newport. He died in 1979.

== Syndication ==
Reruns of Life Is Worth Living and The Fulton Sheen Program continued to circulate as late as the early 1990s on broadcast stations.

In 2002, a Cause for Canonization was opened to investigate the potential sainthood of Bishop Sheen. This, alongside the availability of his material on the internet, has resulted in a resurgence in popularity for Sheen's work.

His programs were reintroduced into circulation by the Catholic cable network EWTN, with new introductions by actor Joseph Campanella. In the early 2010s, he became a popular figure among younger Catholics.

== Episode status ==
St. Bernard's School of Theology and Ministry in Rochester, New York, owns the copyright to the series, and The Fulton J. Sheen Company, Inc. owns the licensing rights. The Institute is thought to have the entire series in their archive.

Also, the UCLA Film and Television Archive has four episodes, the Museum of Broadcast Communications has five episodes, the Paley Center for Media has an unknown number of episodes, and the J. Fred MacDonald collection at the Library of Congress has six episodes.

== Theme music ==
The theme of Life is Worth Living during its time on the DuMont Network was Charles William's "Said the Bells".

For Sheen's later programs, a recording of composer Fritz Kreisler's "Marche Miniature Viennoise" (1925) was used, but no on-screen credit was given for title, composer, or orchestra performing the song. Although Kreisler did record a version of this classical composition, it was arranged at a faster tempo and was therefore not the version used for the series.

== See also ==
- List of programs broadcast by the DuMont Television Network
- List of surviving DuMont Television Network broadcasts

== Bibliography ==
- David Weinstein, The Forgotten Network: DuMont and the Birth of American Television (Philadelphia: Temple University Press, 2004) ISBN 1-59213-245-6
- Alex McNeil, Total Television, Fourth edition (New York: Penguin Books, 1980) ISBN 0-14-024916-8
- Tim Brooks and Earle Marsh, The Complete Directory to Prime Time Network and Cable TV Shows 1946–Present, Ninth edition (New York: Ballantine Books, 2007) ISBN 978-0-345-49773-4
