= Arnaldo Catalan =

Filipino prelate of the Catholic Church

His Excellency, The Most Reverend Arnaldo S. Catalán
- Apostolic Nuncio to Rwanda; Titular Archbishop of Apollonia
- Appointed: 31 January 2022
- Predecessor: Andrzej Józwowicz
- Other post: Titular Archbishop of Apollonia
- Previous post: Chargé d’affaires to China (2019–2022)

Orders
- Ordination: 25 March 1994 by Cardinal Jaime Sin
- Consecration: 11 February 2022 by Cardinal Luis Antonio Tagle

Personal details
- Born: Arnaldo Sánchez Catalán; 18 September 1966 (age 60) Manila, Philippines
- Denomination: Roman Catholic
- Motto: Iuxta Misericordiam non Deficumus ('Through mercy, we are not discouraged', 2 Corinthians 4:1)
- Coat of arms: Arnaldo S. Catalán's coat of arms

Styles of Arnaldo S. Catalán
- Reference style: His Excellency; The Most Reverend
- Spoken style: Your Excellency
- Religious style: Archbishop

Ordination history of Arnaldo Catalan
History
Priestly ordination
- Ordained by: Cardinal Jaime Lachica Sin (Manila)
Episcopal consecration
- Principal consecrator: Cardinal Luis Antonio Tagle
- Co-consecrators: Cardinal Jose Advincula (Archbishop of Manila); Charles John Brown (Apostolic Nuncio to the Philippines)

Arnaldo Sánchez Catalán (born 18 September 1966) is a Filipino prelate of the Catholic Church who has been an apostolic nuncio since 2022, currently Apostolic Nuncio to Rwanda and titular Archbishop of Apollonia.

== Biography ==
Arnaldo Sánchez Catalán was born on 18 September 1966 in Manila, Philippines. He was ordained a priest for the Archdiocese of Manila on 25 March 1994.

== Diplomatic career ==
He entered the diplomatic service of the Holy See on 1 July 2001 and served in the pontifical representations in Zambia, Kuwait, Mexico, Honduras, Turkey, India, Argentina, Canada, Philippines and Taiwan.

On 31 January 2022, Pope Francis appointed him Titular Archbishop of Apollonia and Apostolic Nuncio to Rwanda. He was ordained to the episcopacy at the Manila Cathedral on 11 February 2022, with Cardinal Luis Antonio Tagle, Prefect of the Congregation for the Evangelization of Peoples as the Principal Consecrator, and Cardinal Jose Advincula, Archbishop of Manila and Archbishop Charles John Brown, Apostolic Nuncio to the Philippines, as Co-Consecrators.

== See also ==
- List of heads of the diplomatic missions of the Holy See
