= Castelserás =

Castelserás, Spain
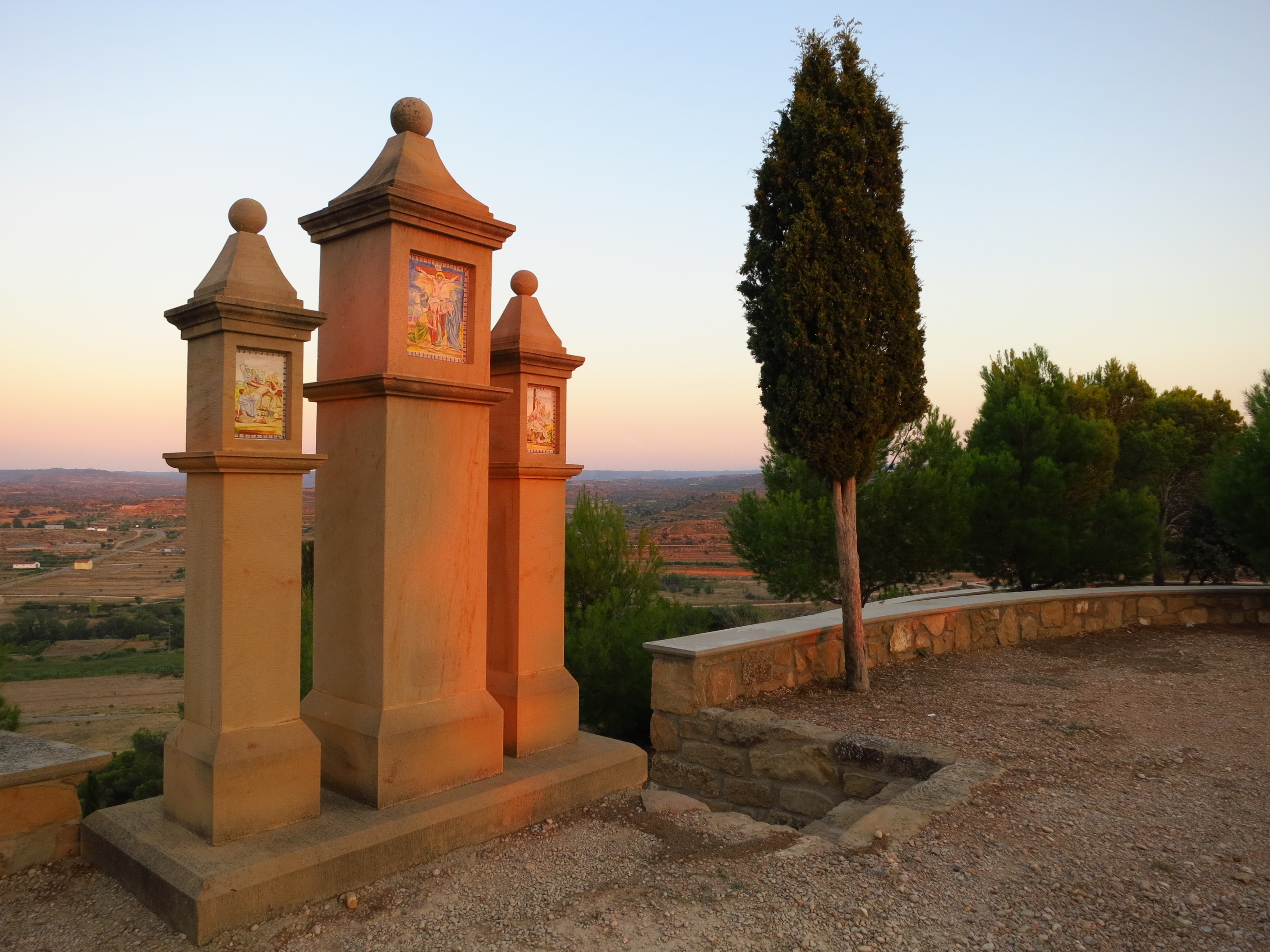

- Location within Spain
- Coordinates: 40°59′N 0°8′W
- Country: Spain
- Autonomous community: Aragon
- Province: Teruel
- Municipality: Castelserás

Area
  - Total: 31.52 km^{2} (12.17 sq mi)
- Elevation: 382 m (1,253 ft)

Population (2025-01-01)
  - Total: 804
  - Density: 25.5/km^{2} (66.1/sq mi)
- Time zone: UTC+1 (CET)
  - Summer (DST): UTC+2 (CEST)

Castelserás is a municipality located in the province of Teruel, Aragon, Spain. According to the 2004 census (INE), the municipality has a population of 818 inhabitants.

== Notable people ==
- Ramiro Moliner Inglés (1941–2024), Apostolic Nuncio emeritus of Albania
- Carmen Valero (1955–2024), middle-distance runner

== See also ==
- List of municipalities in Teruel
