= Ramiro Moliner Inglés =

Spanish prelate of the Catholic Church (1941–2024)

His Excellency, The Most Reverend Ramiro Moliner Inglés
- Apostolic Nuncio emeritus of Albania; Titular Archbishop of Sarda
- Appointed: 26 July 2008
- Retired: 1 September 2016
- Predecessor: John Bulaitis
- Successor: Charles John Brown
- Other post: Titular Archbishop of Sarda (1993–2024)
- Previous posts: Apostolic Nuncio of Ethiopia, Djibouti and Apostolic Delegate to Somalia (2004–2008); Special Representative to the African Union (2004–2008); Apostolic Nuncio of Guatemala (1997–2004); Apostolic Nuncio of Solomon Islands and Papua New Guinea (1993–1997)

Orders
- Ordination: 19 March 1965 by Pedro Cantero Cuadrado
- Consecration: 22 February 1993 by Antonio María Javierre Ortas, Elías Yanes Álvarez, and Cipriano Calderón Polo

Personal details
- Born: 13 March 1941 Castelserás, Spain
- Died: 20 August 2024 (aged 83) Alcañiz, Spain

Styles of Ramiro Moliner Inglés
- Reference style: His Excellency; The Most Reverend
- Spoken style: Your Excellency
- Religious style: Archbishop

Ramiro Moliner Inglés (13 March 1941 – 20 August 2024) was a Spanish prelate of the Catholic Church who spent his career working in the diplomatic service of the Holy See.

== Biography ==
Ramiro Moliner Inglés was born on 13 March 1941 in Castelserás, Province of Teruel, Spain. He studied at the seminary of Zaragoza and was ordained a priest on 19 March 1965. He earned a doctorate in social sciences at the Pontifical Gregorian University. Moliner Inglés died on 20 August 2024, at the age of 83.

== Diplomatic career ==
At the Pontifical Ecclesiastical Academy, he studied diplomacy from 1970 to 1973. His early assignments in the diplomatic service of the Holy See took him to New Zealand, Ecuador, Costa Rica, Brazil, Uruguay, Sudan, and Great Britain.

Pope John Paul II appointed him on 2 January 1993 Titular Archbishop of Sarda and Apostolic Nuncio to Papua New Guinea and the Solomon Islands. He received his episcopal consecration on 22 February from Cardinal Antonio María Javierre Ortas.

On 10 May 1997, John Paul named him Apostolic Nuncio to Guatemala.

On 17 January 2004, John Paul appointed him Apostolic Nuncio to Ethiopia and Djibouti and Apostolic Delegate to Somalia.

Pope Benedict XVI appointed him apostolic nuncio to Albania on 26 July 2008.

Moliner Inglés retired on 1 September 2016.

== See also ==
- List of heads of the diplomatic missions of the Holy See

Diplomatic posts
| Preceded by Giovanni Ceirano | Apostolic Nuncio to Papua New Guinea; 1993–1997 | Succeeded by Hans Schwemmer |
| Preceded by Giovanni Ceirano | Apostolic Nuncio to Solomon Islands; 1993–1997 | Succeeded by Hans Schwemmer |
| Preceded by Giovanni Battista Morandini | Apostolic Nuncio to Guatemala; 1997–2004 | Succeeded by Bruno Musarò |
| Preceded by Silvano Maria Tomasi | Apostolic Nuncio to Ethiopia and Djibouti; 2004–2008 | Succeeded by George Panikulam |
| Preceded by Silvano Maria Tomasi | Apostolic Delegate to Somalia; 2004–2008 | Succeeded by George Panikulam |
| Preceded by John Bulaitis | Apostolic Nuncio to Albania; 2008–2016 | Succeeded by Charles John Brown |
Catholic Church titles
| Preceded by François Xavier Nguyễn Văn Sang | Titular Archbishop of Sarda; 1993–2004 | Succeeded by Vacant |
