= Holy See–Sri Lanka relations =

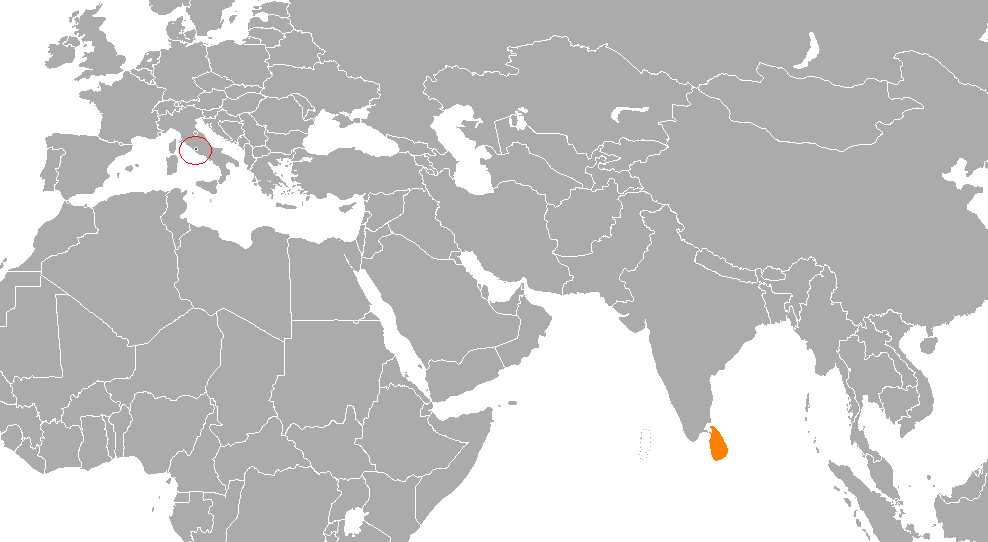

- Holy See: Sri Lanka

Holy See–Sri Lanka relations are the foreign relations between the Holy See and Sri Lanka. Both countries established diplomatic relations in 1976. The Holy See has a nunciature in Colombo. As of December 2011, Ms. Tamara Kunanayakam, Sri Lanka's Permanent Representative to the United Nations in Geneva, is the concurrently accredited ambassador of Sri Lanka to the Holy See. She presented her Credentials on 15 December 2011 to Pope Benedict XVI. The current Apostolic Nuncio to Sri Lanka is Archbishop Brian Udaigwe, who was named to the position by Pope Francis on 13 June 2020.

== History ==
Diplomatic relations were established between the Holy See and Sri Lanka on 6 September 1975.

== Papal visits ==
Three popes have visited Sri Lanka: Pope Paul VI in December 1970, Pope John Paul II in January 1995 and Pope Francis in January 2015. Sri Lankan president Mahinda Rajapaksa met Pope Benedict XVI in the Vatican in June 2012.

Pope Francis visited Sri Lanka and met with Sri Lankan President Maithripala Sirisena on 13 January 2015. Francis was the first pope to have visited the Shrine of Our Lady of Madhu.

== See also ==
- Foreign relations of the Holy See
- Foreign relations of Sri Lanka
