= Antoine Camilleri (prelate) =

Maltese prelate of the Catholic Church

His Excellency, The Most Reverend Antoine Camilleri
- Apostolic Nuncio to Cuba; Titular Archbishop of Skálholt
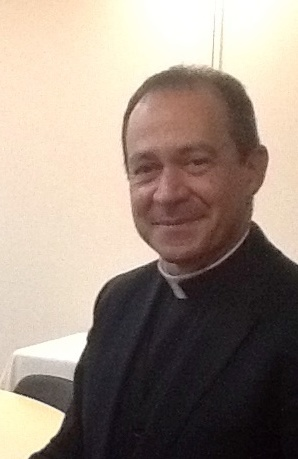
- Camilleri in 2016
- Church: Catholic Church
- Appointed: 20 May 2024
- Predecessor: Giampiero Gloder
- Other post: Titular Archbishop of Skálholt
- Previous posts: Apostolic Nuncio to Ethiopia and Djibouti, Special Representative to the African Union, Apostolic Delegate to Somalia (2019-2024); Under-Secretary for Relations with States, Secretariat of State (2013-2019)

Orders
- Ordination: 5 July 1991
- Consecration: 4 October 2019 by Pope Francis
- Rank: Archbishop

Personal details
- Born: 20 August 1965 (age 60) Sliema, Malta
- Motto: Benedictum Lignum Per Quod Fit Iustitia
- Coat of arms

Styles of Antoine Camilleri
- Reference style: The Most Reverend
- Spoken style: Your Excellency
- Religious style: Archbishop

Antoine Camilleri (born 20 August 1965) is a Maltese prelate of the Catholic Church who served as the Under-Secretary for Relations with States in the Secretariat of State of the Holy See, until he was named an archbishop and given the title of apostolic nuncio in 2019. He joined the diplomatic service of the Holy See in 1999.

== Biography ==
Camilleri was born in Sliema, Malta on 20 August 1965. He attended St. Joseph's School, Sliema, and St. Aloysius' College, Birkirkara. He graduated Doctor of Laws from the University of Malta in 1988.

He was ordained to the priesthood on 5 July 1991 and was incardinated into the Archdiocese of Malta. He served as vice parish priest at Our Lady of Mount Carmel Church, Gzira (1991–92). To study canon law he entered the Pontifical Lateran University in 1992 and obtained a doctorate. In 1996 he was appointed Defender of the Bond at the Archdiocesan Ecclesiastical Tribunal (1996–97) of Malta.

== Diplomatic career ==
He attended the Pontifical Ecclesiastical Academy and on 9 January 1999 joined the diplomatic service of the Holy See. He served in the Apostolic Nunciatures in Papua New Guinea (1999–2002), Uganda (2002–05), and Cuba (2005–06), and then in Rome in the offices of the Secretariat of State.

On 22 February 2013, a few days before the resignation of Pope Benedict XVI from the papacy, he was appointed to replace Ettore Balestrero as Under-Secretary for Relations with States. In that position, roughly equivalent to that of a deputy foreign minister, he played a role in negotiations with many nations, including Israel, Palestine, China, and Vietnam. Speaking on 27 February 2019 at a debate on migration at the United Nations, he said:

If someone were listening to the news for the very first time today, they might assume that migration is synonymous with border insecurity, humanitarian disaster, and human trafficking. The time-tested truth that migration is largely regular, the sign of a healthy economy and the bedrock of many modern nation-states rarely make the news. Yet, when we take a closer look at our own personal history or that of the communities and countries where we live together, one easily recognizes the obvious: migration, especially when it is well-managed, safe, orderly and regular, makes an undeniably positive and necessary contribution to the development of culture, the economy, and society.

On 3 September 2019, Pope Francis named him titular archbishop of Skálholt and gave him the title of apostolic nuncio. He received his episcopal consecration from Francis on 4 October. On 31 October, Pope Francis named him apostolic nuncio to Ethiopia and Djibouti, special representative at the African Union, and apostolic delegate to Somalia.

On 20 May 2024 Pope Francis named him nuncio to Cuba.

== See also ==
- List of heads of the diplomatic missions of the Holy See

Catholic Church titles
Preceded by Ettore Balestrero	Under-Secretary for Relations with States; 22 February 2013 – 2019	Succeeded by Mirosław Stanisław Wachowski
Diplomatic posts
Preceded by Luigi Bianco	Apostolic Nuncio to Ethiopia; 2019 – 2024	Succeeded by Brian Udaigwe
Preceded by Luigi Bianco	Apostolic Nuncio to Djibouti; 2019 - 2024	Succeeded by Brian Udaigwe
Preceded by Luigi Bianco	Apostolic Delegate to Somalia; 2019 - 2024	Succeeded by Brian Udaigwe
Preceded by Giampiero Gloder	Apostolic Nuncio to Cuba; 2024 – present	Succeeded by incumbent
