= Albania–Holy See relations =

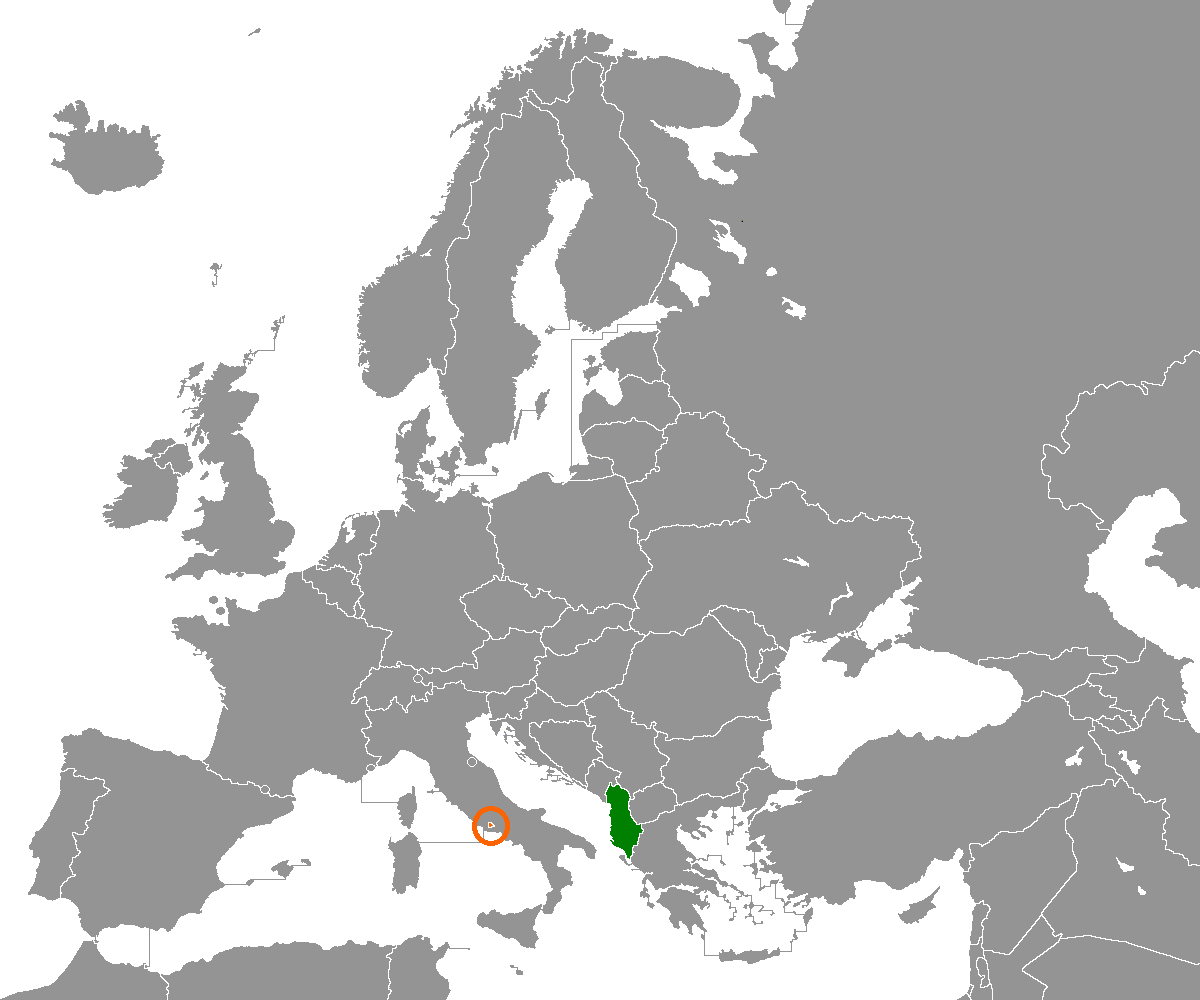
- Albania: Holy See

The Holy See has an apostolic nunciature in Albania, which represents diplomatically the Holy See.

The representative of the Holy See is officially called 'Apostolic Nuncio to Albania' and has an ambassador status. The office of the nunciature is located in the capital of Tirana.

== History ==
The history of the relations between the countries began in the Middle Ages, when Skanderbeg became the chief commander of the crusading forces of Pope Pius II. Later, Giovanni Francesco Albani became pope from 1700 to 1721. He was born to an Albanian father descended from the noble Albani family from the region of Malësi e Madhe in Albania.

The apostolic nunciature in Albania started as an apostolic delegation to Albania by Pope Benedict XV on 12 November 1920, and was elevated to the full rank of a nunciature by Pope John Paul II on 16 January 1991. The current apostolic nuncio to Albania is Charles John Brown, who was appointed by Pope Francis on 9 March 2017.

== See also ==
- Foreign relations of Albania
- Foreign relations of the Holy See
- Apostolic Nunciature to Albania
