= Apostolic Nunciature to Ethiopia =

Diplomatic post of the Holy See

The Apostolic Nunciature to Ethiopia is an ecclesiastical office of the Catholic Church in Ethiopia. It is a diplomatic post of the Holy See, whose representative is called the Apostolic Nuncio with the rank of an ambassador. The Apostolic Nuncio to Ethiopia is usually also the Apostolic Nuncio to Djibouti, the Apostolic Delegate to Somalia and Apostolic Representative to the African Union upon his appointment.

== List of papal representatives ==
Apostolic Internuncios

- Joseph Francis McGeough (9 May 1957 - 17 September 1960)
- Giuseppe Mojoli (27 September 1960 - 14 November 1969)

Apostolic Pro-Nuncios

- Maurice Perrin (16 January 1970 - 15 November 1972)
- Ippolito Rotoli (15 November 1972 - 10 January 1974)
- Raymond Philip Etteldorf (21 June 1974 - October 1982)
- Thomas Anthony White (1 March 1983 - 14 October 1989)
- Patrick Coveney (25 January 1990 - 27 April 1996)

Apostolic Nuncios

- Silvano Maria Tomasi (27 June 1996 - 10 June 2003)
- Ramiro Moliner Inglés (17 January 2004 - 26 July 2008)
- George Panikulam (24 October 2008 - 14 June 2014)
- Luigi Bianco (12 July 2014 - 4 February 2019)
- Antoine Camilleri (31 October 2019 – 20 May 2024)
- Brian Udaigwe (12 April 2025 – present)
