= Andrea Cassulo =

- Apostolic Delegate to Turkey
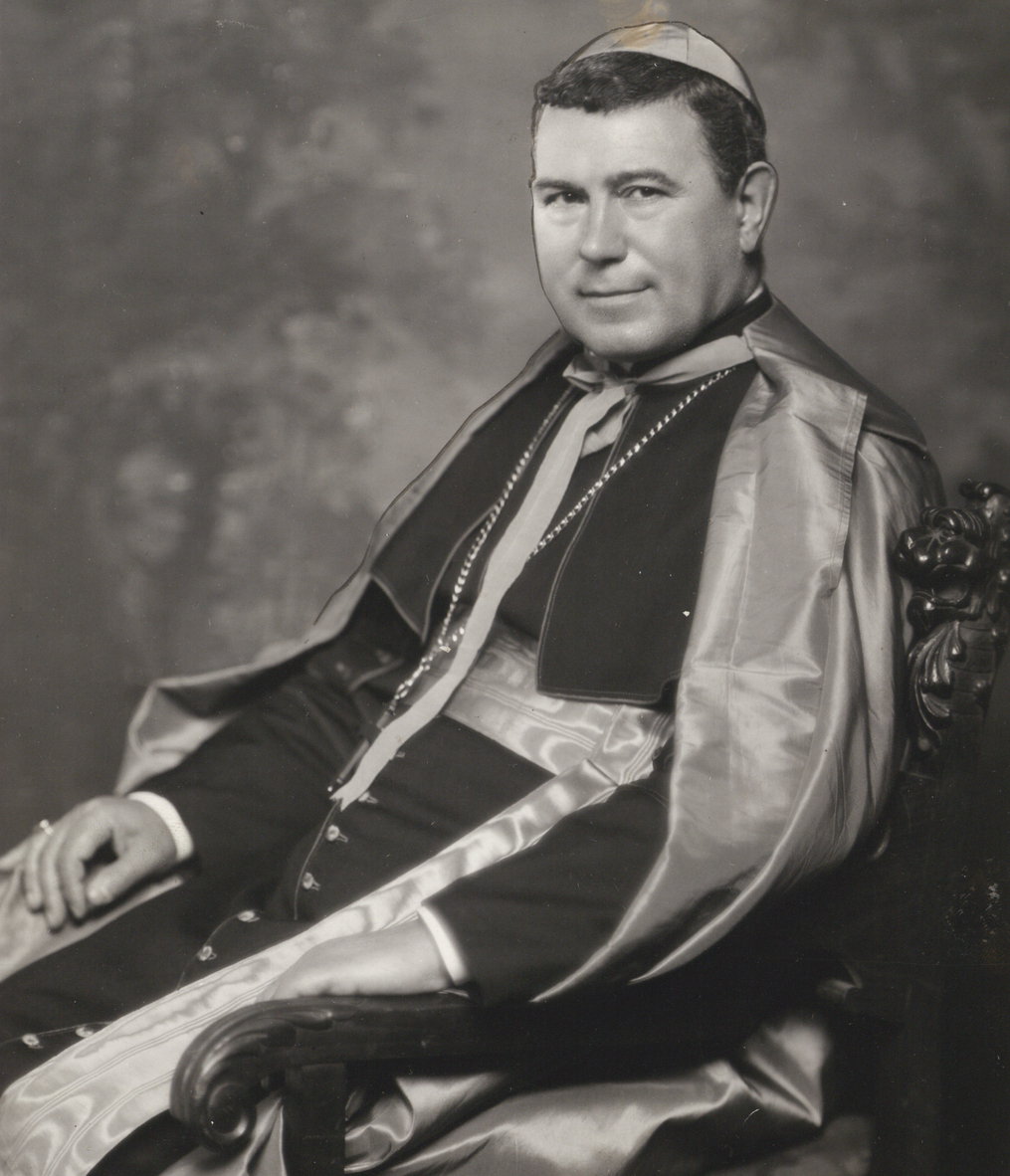
- Church: Catholic Church
- In office: 3 June 1947 – 9 January 1952
- Predecessor: Alcide Marina
- Successor: Paolo Bertoli
- Other posts: Titular Archbishop of Leontopolis in Augustamnica (1933-1952); Apostolic Administrator of Constantinople (1947-1952)
- Previous posts: Apostolic Nuncio to Romania (1936-1947); Apostolic Delegate to Canada and Newfoundland (1927-1936); Titular Archbishop of Leontopolis (1925-1933); Apostolic Delegate to Egypt and Arabia (1921-1927); Titular Bishop of Leontopolis in Bithynia (1922-1925); Bishop of Fabriano e Matelica (1914-1921)

Orders
- Ordination: 23 December 1893 by Alfonso Mistrangelo
- Consecration: 24 May 1914 by Alfonso Mistrangelo

Personal details
- Born: 30 November 1869 Castelletto d'Orba, Province of Alessandria, Kingdom of Italy
- Died: 9 January 1952 (aged 82)

Andrea Cassulo (30 November 1869 – 9 January 1952) was an archbishop of the Roman Catholic Church and a representative of the Holy See in Egypt, Canada, Romania and Turkey from 1921 to 1952.

== Biography ==
He was born in Castelletto d'Orba in 1869 and ordained a priest in 1893 in Florence. In 1914, he was appointed bishop of Fabriano-Matelica. In 1921, he became the titular archbishop of Leontopolis in Augustamnica.

He was the apostolic delegate to Egypt from 1921 to 1927.

He was the apostolic delegate to Canada from 1927 to 1936.

=== Nuncio to Romania ===
Cassulo served as Papal nuncio in Romania during the period of World War II. While the country was never occupied by Nazi Germany, the regime of Marshall Ion Antonescu aligned itself with Hitler, and assisted the Nazi Holocaust.

==== Efforts of behalf of Jews ====
In 1944, the Chief Rabbi of Bucharest praised the work of Cassulo on behalf of Romania's Jews: "the generous assistance of the Holy See… was decisive and salutary. It is not easy for us to find the right words to express the warmth and consolation we experienced because of the concern of the supreme Pontiff, who offered a large sum to relieve the sufferings of deported Jews — sufferings which had been pointed out to him by you after your visit to Transnistria. The Jews of Romania will never forget these facts of historic importance."

According to Morely, as nuncio to Bucharest, Cassulo's "early efforts on behalf of Jews concerned almost exclusively those who had been baptized Catholic". He passed on to the Vatican in 1939, but did not pursue, a project to emigrate the 150,000 converted Jews of Romania to Spain. From 1940 to 1941, his primary diplomatic responsibility was to protest various pieces of legislation insofar as they infringed on the rights of baptized Jews, particularly with respect to intermarriage and attendance of baptized Jews to Catholic schools, which were protected by the Romanian concordat. Overall, Cassulo was "reluctant to intervene, except for the baptized Jews". Morley argues that "his Jewish contemporaries might have exaggerated, in those years of crisis, his influence and efforts on their behalf" based on the difference between Jewish sources and the ADSS.

==== Diplomatic protests ====
In his study of the rescue of Jews during the Holocaust, Jewish historian Martin Gilbert wrote that, Cassulo "appealed directly to Marshall Antonescu to limit the deportations [of Jews to Nazi concentration camps] planned for the summer of 1942. His appeal was ignored; hundreds of thousands of Romanian Jews were transported to Transnistria."

Cassulo made three protests to Antonescu: on 20 November 1940, 2 December 1940 and 14 February 1941.

==== Jewish converts ====
Five days after the last of Cassulo's 1941 diplomatic protests, Antonescu informed the nuncio of his signing a decree allowing students of any ethnic origin to attend their own religious schools. Morely wrote that "much more worrisome to the Vatican" was a March 18, 1941, decree forbidding the conversion of Jews to Christianity, with severe penalties for Jews attempting to convert and cooperating priests. Again, Cassulo protested that this violated the concordat, but the Romanian government replied that the decree did not because it would only affect the "civil status" of baptized Jews.

It became obvious to Cassulo that the motivations of converts were not solely religious, and he wrote to Rome: "it is clear that human motives cannot be denied, but it is likewise true that Providence also uses human means to arrive at salvation". Nationwide statistics on Jewish baptisms are unclear, but they certainly rose to the level that the Romanian government became concerned. According to Morley, although Cassulo was "possibly the most active of the Vatican diplomats in matters concerning the Jews", his protests were limited to violations of the concordat, and thus to the rights of converted Jews. Morley judges him sincere in his belief that it was "God's plan" that the Holocaust increase the number of converts.

=== Last years ===
Cassulo was named Apostolic Nuncio to Turkey on 3 June 1947. He died on 9 January 1952 by a heart attack, exactly after a visit paid to him by orthodox Patriarch Athenagoras.

Catholic Church titles
Preceded by Pietro di Maria	Apostolic Delegate to Canada and Newfoundland; 1927–1936	Succeeded by Ildebrando Antoniutti
