= Jean-Marie Speich =

French prelate of the Catholic Church (born 1955)

His Excellency, The Most Reverend Jean-Marie Speich
- Apostolic Nuncio; Titular Archbishop of Sulci
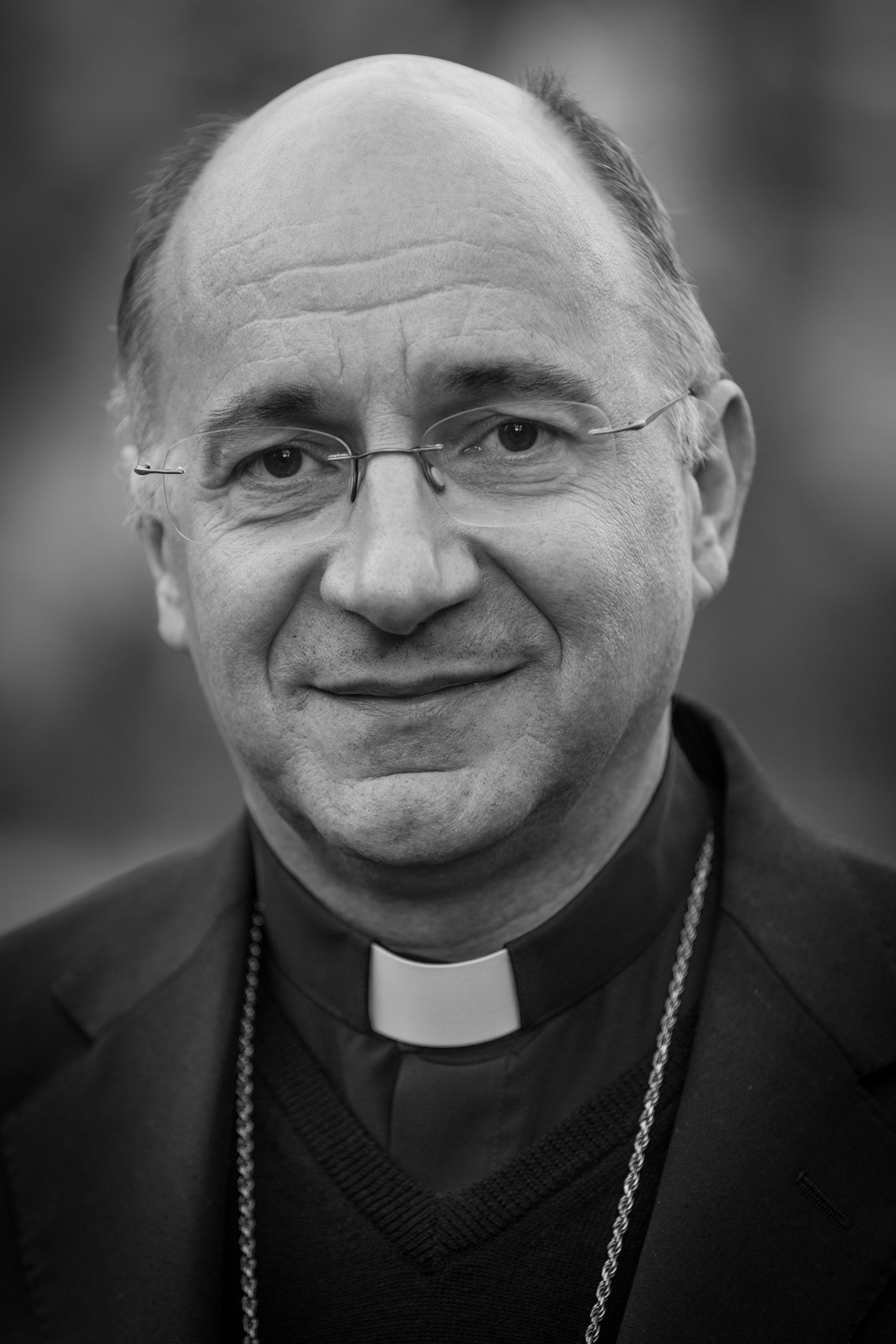
- Appointed: 12 April 2025
- Retired: 21 February 2026
- Predecessor: Paul Tschang In-Nam
- Previous posts: Apostolic Nuncio to Ghana (2013–2019); Apostolic Nuncio to Slovenia and Apostolic Delegate to Kosovo (2019-2025); Apostolic Nuncio to the Netherlands (2025–2026)

Orders
- Ordination: 9 October 1982
- Consecration: 24 October 2013 by Pope Francis, Jean-Pierre Gallet and Antonio Mattiazzo

Personal details
- Born: Jean-Marie Speich; 15 June 1955 (age 71) Strasbourg, France
- Denomination: Roman Catholic
- Education: Pontifical Ecclesiastical Academy; Pontifical Gregorian University
- Motto: WI I KAN (As I can)
- Coat of arms: Jean-Marie Speich's coat of arms

Styles of Jean-Marie Speich
- Reference style: His Excellency
- Spoken style: Your Excellency
- Religious style: Archbishop

Ordination history of Jean-Marie Speich
History
Priestly ordination
- Ordained by: Bishop Léon Arthur Elchinger, Bishop of Strasbourg.
Episcopal consecration
- Principal consecrator: Pope Francis
- Co-consecrators: Giovanni Tonucci; Jean-Pierre Grallet, O.F.M.

Jean-Marie Speich (born 15 June 1955) is a French prelate of the Catholic Church who worked in the diplomatic service of the Holy See from 1986 until his retirement in 2026. He was an apostolic nuncio from 2013 to 2026. He has been an archbishop since 2013.

== Biography ==
Speich was born on 15 June 1955 in Strasbourg, France, to Xavier Speich and Marie Thérèse Goetz, residents of Willgottheim (Bas-Rhin). His sister Andrée Speich is a cloistered Benedictine nun.

Speich was ordained to the priesthood on 9 October 1982, by Bishop Léon Arthur Elchinger. From 1982 to 1984, he served as assistant pastor at St. Vincent de Paul Parish in the Archdiocese of Strasbourg. To prepare for a diplomatic career he entered the Pontifical Ecclesiastical Academy in 1984.

== Diplomatic career ==
He entered the diplomatic service of the Holy See on 1 July 1986 and was assigned to Apostolic Nunciatures of the Holy See in Haiti, Nigeria, Bolivia, Canada, Germany, the United Kingdom, Egypt, Spain and Cuba. On 27 March 2008, he became head of the section for French-speaking countries at the Secretariat of State.

Speich's academic degrees include a doctorate in canon law, and a licentiate in sacred theology, both from the Pontifical Gregorian University.

On 17 August 2013, Pope Francis named Speich Apostolic Nuncio to Ghana and titular archbishop of Sulci. He received his episcopal consecration from Pope Francis on 24 October.

On 19 March 2019, Pope Francis appointed him Apostolic Nuncio to Slovenia and Apostolic Delegate to Kosovo.

On 12 April 2025, Pope Francis appointed him as nuncio to the Netherlands.

On 21 February 2026, Pope Leo XIV accepted his resignation, which he had submitted at the age of 70 as nuncios are permitted to do.

The Speich family coat of arms dates to the first half of the 13th century. (Note: The blazon of the arms is as follows: German: In Silber über grünem Dreiberg steigender gebildeter goldener Mond, uberhöht von goldenem Kreuz, French: D'argent à la croix d'or alésée à pal brochant la fasce en chef sur la lune croissante d'or figurée en abîme, le tout sur trois pointes de montagne sinople) Speich assumed the motto of Speich family of Strasbourg, which has been in use since 1415. This motto, "Wi I Kan", which is in Alemannic German and means "As I can".

== Honours ==
Ecclesiastical

- Chaplain of His Holiness, 15 October 1988.
- Honorary Prelate of His Holiness, 10 November 1998.

Others

- National Order of Honour and Merit of Haiti, Commander, 2 August 1989.
- Order of Merit of the Federal Republic of Germany, Commander, 24 February 1999.
- Sovereign Military Order of Malta, Conventual Chaplain ad honorem, 24 June 2006.
- Legion of Honor of the Republic of France, Knight, 1 January 2010.
- Dynastic Order of Saints Maurice and Lazarus of the House of Savoy, Grand Officer, 14 September 2013.

== See also ==
- List of heads of the diplomatic missions of the Holy See

Diplomatic posts
Preceded by George Antonysamy	Titular Archbishop of Sulci; 17 August 2013 - present	incumbent
Preceded by Léon Kalenga Badikebele	Apostolic Nuncio to Ghana; 17 August 2013 - 19 March 2019	Succeeded by Henryk Jagodziński
Preceded by Juliusz Janusz	Apostolic Nuncio to Slovenia; Apostolic Delegate to Kosovo; 19 March 2019 - 12 April 2025	Succeeded by Luigi Bianco
Preceded by Paul Tschang In-Nam	Apostolic Nuncio to the Netherlands; 12 April 2025 - 21 February 2026	Succeeded by Santiago De Wit Guzmán
