= Ippolito Rotoli =

Italian prelate

- Apostolic Pro-Nuncio to Japan
- Church: Catholic Church
- In office: 10 January 1974 – 4 October 1977
- Predecessor: Bruno Wüstenberg
- Successor: Mario Pio Gaspari
- Other post: Titular Archbishop of Thibiuca (1967-1977)
- Previous posts: Apostolic Pro-Nuncio to Ethiopia (1972-1974); Apostolic Pro-Nuncio to Korea (1967-1972)

Orders
- Ordination: 20 June 1937
- Consecration: 8 December 1967 by Amleto Giovanni Cicognani

Personal details
- Born: 2 September 1914 Sezze Romano, Province of Rome, Kingdom of Italy
- Died: 4 October 1977 (aged 63)

Ippolito Rotoli (2 September 1914 – 4 October 1977) was an Italian prelate of the Catholic Church who worked in the diplomatic service of the Holy See. He became an archbishop in 1967 and from then until his death served as an Apostolic Nuncio.

== Biography ==
Ippolito Rotoli was born on 2 September 1914 in Sezze Romano, Italy. He was ordained a priest on 20 June 1937.

To prepare for a diplomatic career he entered the Pontifical Ecclesiastical Academy in 1944.

On 2 September 1967, Pope Paul VI named him titular archbishop of Thibiuca and Apostolic Pro-Nuncio to Korea.

He received his episcopal consecration in 8 December 1967 from Cardinal Amleto Cicognani.

On 17 November 1972 Pope Paul appointed him Apostolic Pro-Nuncio to Ethiopia.

On 10 January 1974, Pope Paul named him Apostolic Pro-Nuncio to Japan.

He died on 4 October 1977.
