= Apostolic Nunciature to Djibouti =

Diplomatic post of the Holy See

The Apostolic Nunciature to Djibouti is an ecclesiastical office of the Catholic Church in Djibouti. It is a diplomatic post of the Holy See, whose representative is called the Apostolic Nuncio with the rank of an ambassador. The title Apostolic Nuncio to Djibouti is held by the prelate appointed Apostolic Nuncio to Ethiopia; he resides in Ethiopia.

Pope John Paul II established the Apostolic Delegation to Djibouti on 26 March 1992 as part of a broader reorganization of its representation in the region. The Holy See's interests in the region was previously the responsibility of the Apostolic Delegation to the Red Sea Region. (Note: The Holy See identified the country in 1969 by its colonial name: the French Territory of the Afars and the Issas.)

== List of papal representatives ==
Apostolic Delegates

- Patrick Coveney (26 March 1992 - 27 April 1996)

Apostolic Nuncios

- Silvano Maria Tomasi (23 December 2000 - 10 June 2003)
- Ramiro Moliner Inglés (17 January 2004 - 26 July 2008)
- George Panikulam (18 December 2008 - 14 June 2014)
- Luigi Bianco (10 September 2014 - 4 February 2019)
- Antoine Camilleri (31 October 2019 – 20 May 2024)
- Brian Udaigwe (3 November 2025 – present)
