= Nova, Africa =

Former ancient city and Roman bishopric

Nova is a former ancient city and Roman bishopric, now in Tunisia (precise site unknown) and a Latin Catholic titular see.

== History ==
It was important enough in the Roman province of Africa Proconsularis, in the papal sway, to become one of the many suffragan dioceses of its capital's Metropolitan of Carthage, but faded like most.

It has two historically documented bishops:

- Rogatianus, participant at the Council of Carthage called in 256 by its saint Cyprian on the lapsi, Christians who accepted forced pagan sacrificing to avoid martyrdom
- Secondinus, who intervened at a council in Constantinople in 451.

== Titular see ==
In 1933, the diocese was nominally restored as the Latin titular bishopric of Nova (Latin and Curiate Italian) / Noven(sis) (Latin adjective). The title has been held by:

- Paul-Marie-Maurice Perrin (9 July 1964 – 2 August 1965)
- Francis John Spence (1 April 1967 – 17 August 1970)
- Johannes Kleineidam (12 September 1970 – death 2 June 1981) as Auxiliary Bishop of Berlin (Germany) (12 September 1970 – 2 June 1981)
- Lajos Bálint (9 July 1981 – 14 March 1990)
- Mario del Valle Moronta Rodríguez (4 April 1990 – 2 December 1995) as Auxiliary Bishop of Archdiocese of Caracas (Venezuela) (4 April 1990 – 2 December 1995), later Bishop of Los Teques (Venezuela) (2 December 1995 – 14 April 1999), Bishop of San Cristóbal de Venezuela (Venezuela) (14 April 1999 – ...), Second Vice-President of Episcopal Conference of Venezuela (12 January 2012 – ...)
- Luigi De Magistris (6 March 1996 – 22 November 2001)
- Juan Carlos Cárdenas Toro (2015.06.26 – ...), Auxiliary Bishop of Cali (Colombia), no previous prelature

== See also ==
- List of Catholic dioceses in Tunisia

== Sources and external links ==
- GCatholic - data for all sections

Bibliography

- J. Mesnage, L'Afrique chrétienne, Paris 1912, p. 213
