= Apostolic Representative to the African Union =

The Apostolic Representative to the African Union is an ecclesiastical office of the Catholic Church. It is a diplomatic post of the Holy See, whose representative is called the Apostolic Representative with the rank of an ambassador. The office was established in 2003. The title is held by the prelate appointed Apostolic Nuncio to Ethiopia; he resides in Addis Ababa.

== Apostolic Representative ==
- Ramiro Moliner Inglés (17 January 2004 - 26 July 2008)
- George Panikulam (24 October 2008 - 14 June 2014)
- Luigi Bianco (12 July 2014 - 4 February 2019)
- Antoine Camilleri (31 October 2019 – 20 May 2024)
- Brian Udaigwe (3 November 2025 – present)
