= Pietro Sigismondi =

Italian prelate (1908–1967)

- Secretary of the Congregation for Propagation of the Faith
- Church: Catholic Church
- In office: 27 September 1954 – 25 May 1967
- Predecessor: Filippo Bernardini
- Successor: Sergio Pignedoli
- Other post: Titular Archbishop of Neapolis in Pisidia (1949-1967)
- Previous posts: Apostolic Delegate to Rwanda & Belgian Congo (1949-1954)

Orders
- Ordination: 15 August 1930
- Consecration: 8 January 1950 by Pietro Fumasoni Biondi

Personal details
- Born: 23 February 1908 Villa d'Almè, Province of Bergamo, Kingdom of Italy
- Died: 25 May 1967 (aged 59) Rome, Italy

Pietro Sigismondi (23 February 1908 – 25 May 1967) was an Italian prelate of the Catholic Church who served in the diplomatic service of the Holy See from 1934 to 1954 and then held a senior position in the Roman Curia for thirteen years.

== Biography ==
Pietro Sigismondi was born on 23 February 1908 in Villa d'Almè, Italy. He was ordained a priest of the Diocese of Bergamo on 15 August 1930.

To prepare for a diplomatic career he entered the Pontifical Ecclesiastical Academy in 1933.

His first posting was as secretary of nunciature in Paris in 1934. In 1939 he returned to Rome and worked at the Congregation for Extraordinary Ecclesiastical Affairs in the Secretariat of State to 1949. He then spent six months in Belgrade.

On 16 December 1949, Pope Pius XII appointed him titular archbishop of Neapolis in Pisidia and Apostolic Delegate to both the Belgian Congo and Rwanda. He received his episcopal consecration on 8 January 1950 from Cardinal Pietro Fumasoni Biondi.

In 1954, Pope Pius appointed him Secretary of the Congregation for the Propagation of the Faith. He was named a consultor to Congregation for the Doctrine of the Faith on 9 December 1954.

He died on 25 May 1967 at the age of 59.
