= Michael Izen =

Roman Catholic bishop

His Excellency, The Most Reverend Michael Izen
- Auxiliary Bishop of Saint Paul and Minneapolis
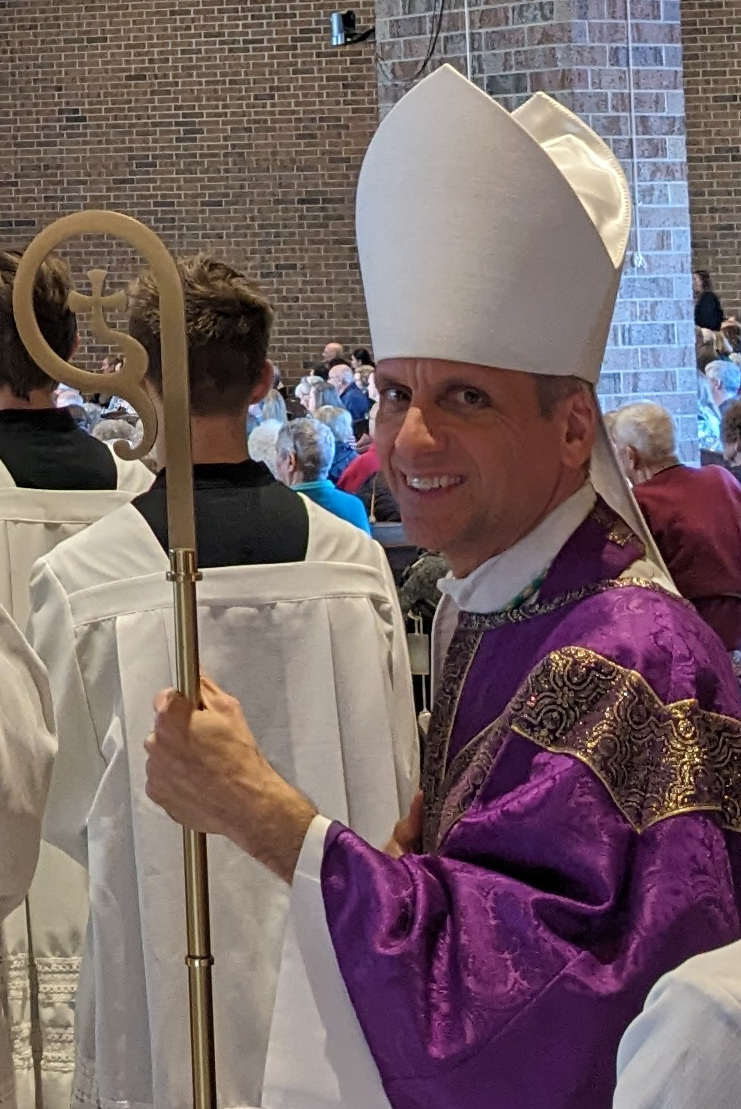
- Izen in 2024
- Archdiocese: Saint Paul and Minneapolis
- Appointed: January 5, 2023
- Installed: April 11, 2023
- Other post: Titular Bishop of Newport

Orders
- Ordination: May 28, 2005 by Harry Joseph Flynn
- Consecration: April 11, 2023 by Bernard Hebda, Andrew Cozzens, and Joseph A. Williams

Personal details
- Born: January 12, 1967 (age 59) Fairmont, Minnesota, US
- Education: St. John's University; Saint John Vianney Seminary; Saint Paul Seminary
- Motto: Emmanuel - God with us

Michael John Izen (born January 12, 1967) is an American Catholic prelate who serves as an auxiliary bishop for the Archdiocese of Saint Paul and Minneapolis in Minnesota.

== Biography ==
=== Early life ===
Michael Izen was born on January 12, 1967, in Fairmont, Minnesota, to John and JoAnna Izen. He is the youngest of six children and is of Lebanese descent. He attended Fairmont High School. After high school, Izen entered St. John's University in Collegeville, Minnesota, where he received a degree in mathematics and computer science.

After finishing college, Izen worked nine years for 3M Company as a systems analyst. Having decided to become a priest, Izen left 3M to attend Saint Paul Seminary in Minneapolis, Minnesota. He received a Master of Divinity degree from the seminary.

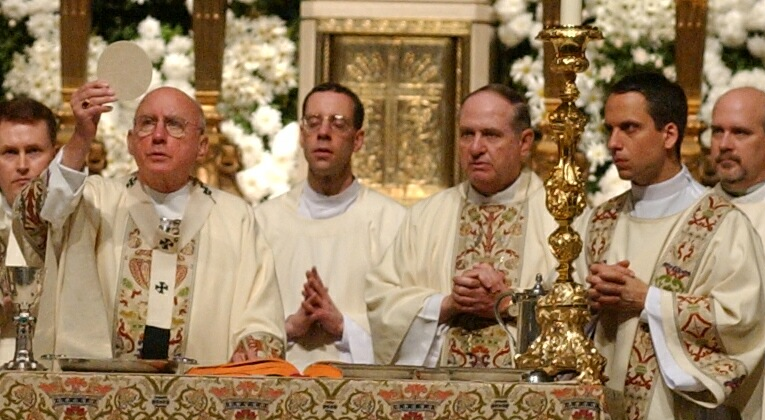
Deacon Izen in a white dalmatic at a 2004 ordination.

=== Priesthood ===
Izen was ordained to the priesthood for the Archdiocese of Saint Paul and Minneapolis on May 28, 2005, by Archbishop Harry Flynn at the Cathedral of Saint Paul in St. Paul, Minnesota. The archdiocese assigned Izen as associate pastor at Divine Mercy Parish in Faribault, Minnesota.

In 2007, the archdiocese transferred Izen to St. Timothy Parish in Maple Lake, Minnesota, to serve a pastor there. He was moved in 2012 to serve as pastor of St. Raphael's Parish in Crystal, Minnesota. After three years at St. Raphael's, Izen became pastor of St. Michael and St. Mary's Parishes in Stillwater, Minnesota, serving there until 2023.

=== Auxiliary Bishop of Saint Paul and Minneapolis ===
Pope Francis appointed Izen as an auxiliary bishop of Saint Paul and Minneapolis on January 5, 2023. On April 11, 2023, Izen was consecrated as a bishop at the Cathedral of Saint Paul by Bernard Hebda, with Andrew Cozzens and Joseph A. Williams serving as co-consecrators.

Styles of Michael John Izen
- Reference style: His Excellency; The Most Reverend
- Spoken style: Your Excellency
- Religious style: Bishop

== See also ==
- Catholic Church hierarchy
- Catholic Church in the United States
- Historical list of the Catholic bishops of the United States
- List of Catholic bishops of the United States
- Lists of patriarchs, archbishops, and bishops

== Episcopal succession ==
Catholic Church titles
| Preceded by - | Auxiliary Bishop of Saint Paul and Minneapolis; 2023-Present | Succeeded by - |
