= Joseph McGeough (nuncio) =

American prelate

Joseph Francis McGeough
- Apostolic Nuncio to Ireland
- Church: Catholic Church
- In office: 8 July 1967 – March 1969
- Predecessor: Giuseppe Sensi
- Successor: Gaetano Alibrandi
- Other post: Titular Archbishop of Hemesa (1960-1970)
- Previous posts: Apostolic Delegate to Southern Africa (1952-1960); Apostolic Internuncio to Ethiopia (1957-1960)

Orders
- Ordination: 20 December 1930 by Giuseppe Palica
- Consecration: 28 October 1960 by Pope John XXIII

Personal details
- Born: 29 August 1903 New York City, New York, United States
- Died: 12 October 1970 (aged 67)

Joseph Francis McGeough (29 August 1903 – 12 October 1970) was an American prelate of the Catholic Church who worked in the diplomatic service of the Holy See.

== Biography ==
Joseph McGeough was born on 29 August 1903 in New York City. He studied at the seminaries of the Archdiocese of New York and at the North American College in Rome. He was ordained a priest there on 20 December 1930. From 1931 to 1938 he did pastoral work in the Bronx and taught at a high school in Katonah, New York. He worked in the Roman Curia at the Congregation for the Oriental Churches from 1938 to 1943. He then moved to the Secretariat of State, where he assignments included organizing relief in Austria and Germany at the end of World War II.

On 9 May 1957, Pope Pius XII appointed him Apostolic Internuncio to Ethiopia. (Note: He was the first to hold a Holy See diplomat's title for Ethiopia alone. The Holy See had previously been represented by delegates with regional responsibilities and had even reorganized its offices to correspond to Italy's military conquests in East Africa.)

On 17 September 1960, Pope John XXIII named him titular archbishop of Hemesa and Apostolic Delegate to Southern Africa. He received his episcopal consecration on 28 October 1960 from Pope John.

On 8 July 1967, Pope Paul VI appointed him Apostolic Nuncio to Ireland. He retired at age 65 for health reasons in March 1969; his successor Gaetano Alibrandi was appointed in April.

He died in a Manhattan nursing home after a long illness on 12 October 1970.
