= Charles John Brown =

American bishop and Vatican nuncio

His Excellency, The Most Reverend Charles John Brown KCHS
- Apostolic Nuncio to the Philippines; Titular Archbishop of Aquileia
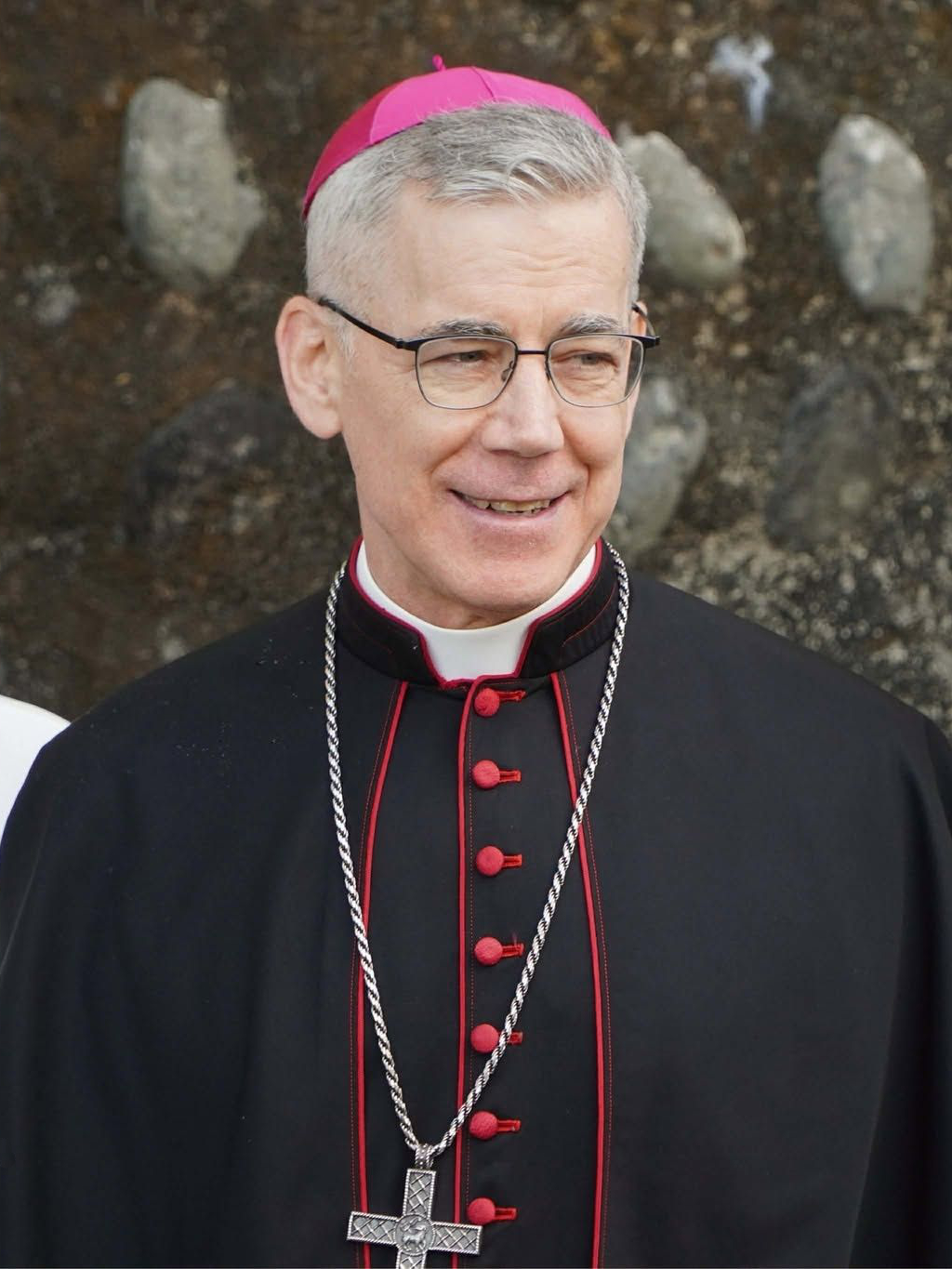
- Brown in 2026
- Appointed: September 28, 2020
- Predecessor: Gabriele Giordano Caccia
- Other post: Titular Archbishop of Aquileia
- Previous posts: Apostolic Nuncio to Albania (2017–2020); Apostolic Nuncio to Ireland (2011–2017)

Orders
- Ordination: May 13, 1989 by John O'Connor
- Consecration: January 6, 2012 by Pope Benedict XVI

Personal details
- Born: October 13, 1959 (age 67) New York City, United States
- Education: Pontifical Atheneum of St. Anselm
- Motto: Ex Christi latere (From the side of Christ)

Styles of Charles John Brown
- Reference style: His Excellency; The Most Reverend
- Spoken style: Your Excellency
- Religious style: Archbishop

Ordination history of Charles John Brown
History
Priestly ordination
- Ordained by: John O'Connor
Episcopal consecration
- Principal consecrator: Pope Benedict XVI
- Co-consecrators: Tarcisio Bertone; William Levada
Episcopal succession
Bishops consecrated by Charles John Brown as principal consecrator
- William Crean: 27 January 2013
- Simon Kulli: 14 September 2017
- Dave Capucao: 5 September 2025
- Sean Buslig Mejia: 2 June 2026

Charles John Brown (born 13 October 1959) is an American prelate of the Catholic Church currently serving as the Apostolic Nuncio to the Philippines

He was ordained a priest of New York on May 13, 1989. bishop on January 6, 2012. He was ordained a bishop on January 6, 2012. He served as Apostolic Nuncio to Ireland from 2011 to 2017 and Apostolic Nuncio to Albania from 2017 to 2020.

Before joining the Vatican diplomatic service, Brown worked at the Congregation for the Doctrine of the Faith in Rome.

== Biography ==
=== Early life and education ===
Charles Brown was born on October 13, 1959, in the East Village of Manhattan, then a mostly Jewish neighborhood. He later recalled that his family "were pretty much the only gentile family in the apartment block" as he grew up as the oldest of six children. When he was five, the family moved to Rye, New York, and in 1971 to Windham, New York.

Brown earned a Bachelor of History degree at the University of Notre Dame in Indiana, a Master of Theology degree at University of Oxford in England, and a Master of Medieval Studies degree at the University of Toronto in Ontario, Canada. He then entered the seminary and earned a Master of Divinity degree at St. Joseph's Seminary and College in Yonkers, New York.

=== Priesthood ===
Brown was ordained a priest for the Archdiocese of New York by Cardinal John O'Connor on May 13, 1989, in St. Patrick's Cathedral in Manhattan.

After his ordination, the archdiocese assigned Brown as an assistant pastor at St. Brendan's Parish in the Bronx Borough of New York City. In 1991, O'Connor sent Brown to study in Rome. He earned a Doctor of Sacred Theology degree at the Pontifical University St. Anselmo.

Brown was consecrated as archbishop by Pope Benedict XVI at St Peter's Basilica in Rome on January 6, 2012.

== Doctrine of the Faith ==
=== Congregation for the Doctrine of the Faith ===
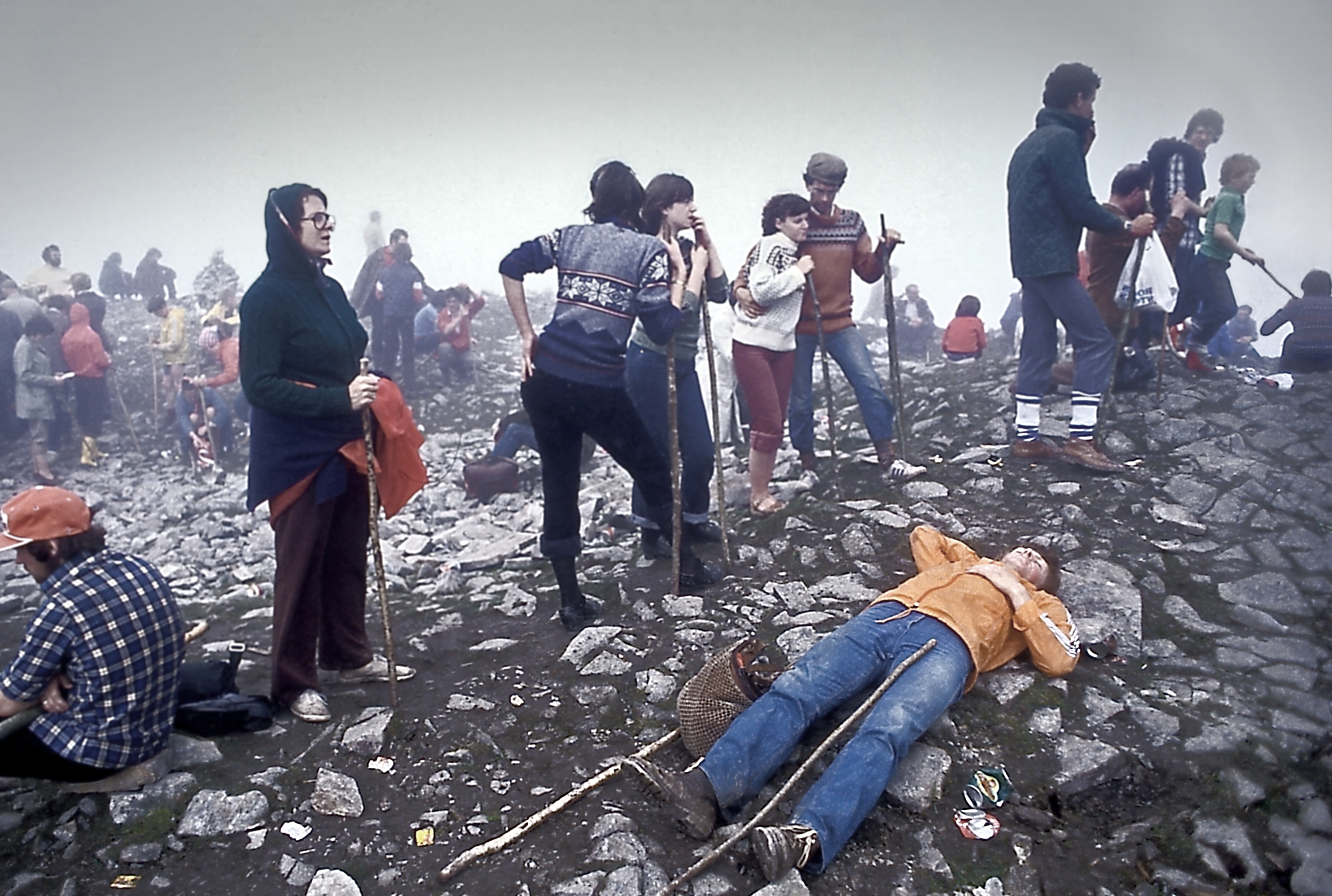
Croagh Patrick pilgrimage (1989)

In 1994, Brown joined the staff of the Congregation for the Doctrine of the Faith, where he worked closely with then-Cardinal Joseph Ratzinger (the future Pope Benedict XVI). He worked at the Congregation for the Doctrine of the Faith for 17 years.

=== International Theological Commission ===
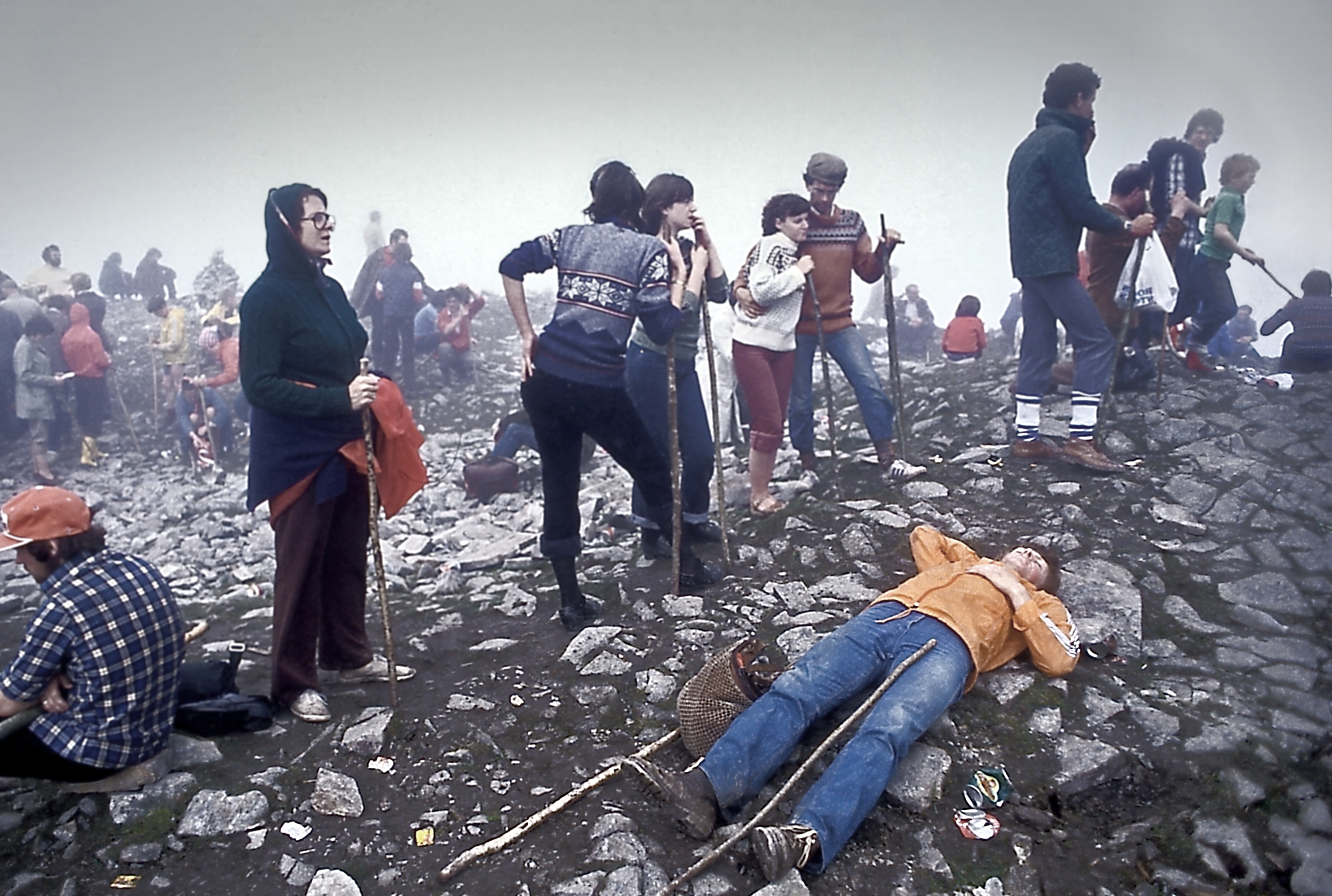
Croagh Patrick pilgrimage (1989)

Brown also served as a chaplain to Pope John Paul II.

He was named as adjunct secretary of the International Theological Commission in September 2009.

Brown is also reported to be a member of the Vatican's official athletic federation, Vatican Athletics.

== Diplomatic career ==
=== Apostolic Nuncio to Ireland ===
Brown was named titular archbishop of Aquileia and Apostolic Nuncio to Ireland on November 26, 2011, by Benedict XVI. Archbishop Timothy M. Dolan of New York remarked that same month that Brown was "young, vibrant, very theologically savvy but pastorally sensitive".

Brown presented his letters of credence from the Holy See to Irish President Michael D. Higgins in Dublin in February 2012.

In July 2012, Brown climbed Croagh Patrick (“The Reek”), a Catholic pilgrimage site in County Mayo associated with Saint Patrick. He then celebrated Mass atop the mountain with 12,000 pilgrims. In July 2013, he launched a prayer card for the annual Croagh Patrick pilgrimage, called Reek Sunday.

In an October 2012 interview with the Catholic News Agency, Brown said the 'hundreds of young people' in Ireland who were participating in Eucharistic adoration, praying the rosary, confessing their sins and 'rejoicing in the liberating love of God' represented the future of the Catholic Church in that country.

Brown told the Catholic News Service in June 2014, "You see a renewed enthusiasm among young Catholics in Ireland now". He said that they represented the best in the tradition of the Second Vatican Council of the 1960s: "...communicating the ancient unchanging faith in a new, vibrant and attractive way".

Brown was also instrumental in having the Irish Embassy to the Vatican reopen. It was closed in 2009 due to revelations about the sexual abuse scandal in the Archdiocese of Dublin and the Diocese of Cloyne. In January 2014, Brown praised the decision of the Government of Ireland to re-open the Irish Embassy to the Holy See.

In 2016, Brown climbed Croagh Patrick again for Reek Sunday, this time with 20,000 pilgrims. During Brown's tenure in Ireland, he participated in the appointment of 15 bishops of Irish dioceses.

=== Apostolic Nuncio to Albania ===
On March 9, 2017, Pope Francis appointed Archbishop Brown as Apostolic Nuncio to Albania.

=== Apostolic Nuncio to the Philippines ===
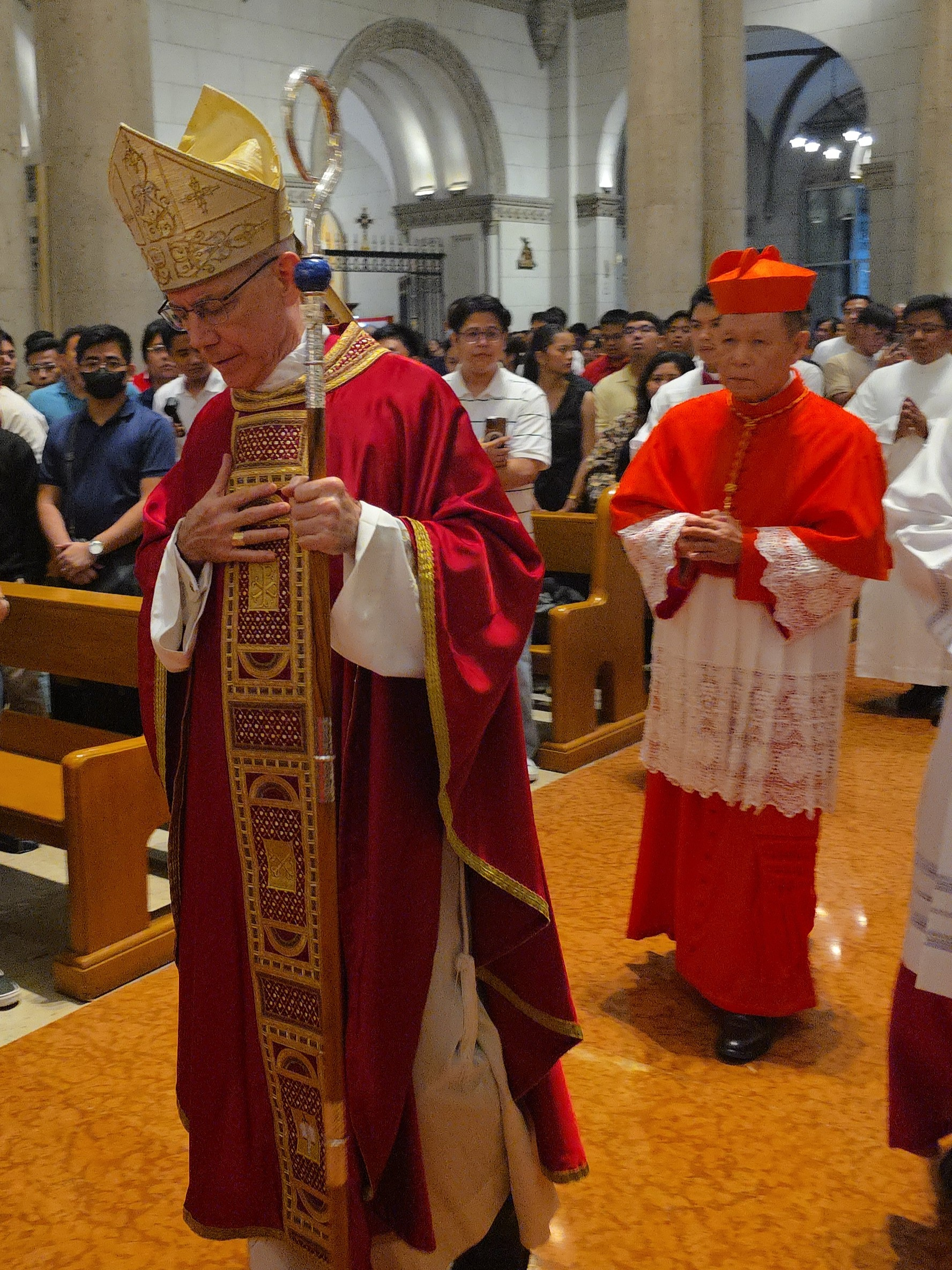
Archbishop Brown (left) with Cardinal José Advíncula, the Archbishop of Manila, at the Manila Cathedral, 2025

On September 28, 2020, Pope Francis named him Apostolic Nuncio to the Philippines.

In the aftermath of Typhoon Rai on December 16, 2021, Archbishop Brown spent Christmas Day with typhoon victims in Siargao Island. He then celebrated Mass on the Feast of the Holy Family at San Nicolás de Tolentino Cathedral in Surigao del Norte, later visiting several parishes.

On February 11, 2022, Archbishop Brown co-consecrated Archbishop Arnaldo Catalán, the current Apostolic Nuncio to Rwanda. He also led the closing ceremonies for that Jubilee Year, officiating the Mass on March 31, 2022, on Limasawa Island, site of the first recorded Mass in the Philippines on March 31, 1521. He later presided over the Mass culminating the Year of Missio Ad Gentes in Cebu on April 24.

On September 26, 2022, Archbishop Brown presided for the Thanksgiving Mass of the Filipino American community at St. Patrick's Cathedral in New York City for the 35th canonization anniversary of St. Lorenzo Ruiz, the first Filipino saint.

Brown has facilitated the granting of the Decree of Pontifical Coronation and performed the Rite of Coronation for eighteen (18) Marian images in the Philippines, the most number of canonical coronations by a Nuncio in history.

On April 8, 2026, the Apostolic Nunciature in the Philippines celebrated the 75th anniversary of Diplomatic Relations between the Holy See and the Philippines with a Holy Mass presided by Archbishop Brown concelebrated with Cardinal Jose Advincula, the Archbishop of Manila, at the Manila Cathedral.

=== Other Diplomatic Missions ===
In May 2024, Brown was the Vatican's special envoy to the inauguration of Lai Ching-te, president of the Republic of China, in Taipei, Taiwan.

== See also ==
- List of heads of the diplomatic missions of the Holy See
- American Catholic bishops serving outside the United States

Diplomatic posts
Preceded by Giuseppe Leanza	Apostolic Nuncio to Ireland; 2011 – 2017	Succeeded by Jude Thaddeus Okolo
Preceded by Ramiro Moliner Inglés	Apostolic Nuncio to Albania; 2017 – 2020	Succeeded by Luigi Bonazzi
Preceded by Gabriele Giordano Caccia	Apostolic Nuncio to the Philippines; 2020 – present	Incumbent
Order of precedence
Preceded by Gabriele Giordano Caccia as Apostolic Nuncio to the Philippines	Dean of the Diplomatic Corps	Succeeded by Apostolic Nuncio to the Philippines
Preceded by Gabriele Giordano Caccia as Apostolic Nuncio to the Philippines	Dean of the Diplomatic Corps	Succeeded by [NA]
