= Apostolic Nunciature to Ireland =

Diplomatic Mission of the Holy See in Ireland

- Location: Dublin, Ireland
- Address: 183 Navan Rd, Ashtown, Dublin, Ireland
- Coordinates: 53°21′59.7″N 6°18′40.2″W
- Opened: 29 November 1929
- Apostolic Nuncio: Luis Mariano Montemayor

The Apostolic Nunciature to Ireland the diplomatic mission of the Holy See to Ireland. It is located in Dublin. The position of Apostolic Nuncio is currently Luis Mariano Montemayor.

The Apostolic Nunciature to Ireland is an ecclesiastical office of the Catholic Church in Ireland, with the rank of an embassy. The nuncio serves both as the ambassador of the Holy See to the President of Ireland, and as delegate and point-of-contact between the Catholic hierarchy in Ireland (including Northern Ireland) and the Pope.

== History ==
The Holy See, as the central government of the Catholic Church from early Christian times (as distinct from the State of Vatican City, which came into existence in 1929), has full diplomatic ties with Ireland as well as many other countries worldwide. As of 2017 the apostolic nuncio to Ireland is Archbishop Luis Mariano Montemayor. The nuncio's residence and office, the nunciature, is at Navan Road, Dublin, Ireland. Diplomatic relations were established between Ireland, then called the Irish Free State, and the Holy See were established on 29 November 1929.

== List of Apostolic Nuncios to Ireland ==
Note: Dates refer to term in office. "†" indicates died in office

- Paschal Robinson (27 Nov 1929 – 27 Aug 1948 †)
- Ettore Felici (2 September 1949 – 9 May 1951 †)
- Gerald Patrick Aloysius O'Hara (27 November 1951 – 8 June 1954)
- Albert Levame (16 June 1954 – 5 December 1958 †)
- Antonio Riberi (19 February 1959 – 28 April 1962)
- Giuseppe Sensi (10 May 1962 – 8 July 1967)
- Joseph Francis McGeough (8 July 1967 – March 1969)
- Gaetano Alibrandi (19 April 1969 – 1989)
- Emanuele Gerada (4 February 1989 – 17 October 1995)
- Luciano Storero (15 November 1995 – 1 October 2000)
- Giuseppe Lazzarotto (11 November 2000 – 22 December 2007)
- Giuseppe Leanza (22 February 2008 – 15 September 2011)
- Charles John Brown (26 November 2011 – 9 March 2017)
- Jude Thaddeus Okolo (13 May 2017 – 1 May 2022)
- Luis Mariano Montemayor (25 February 2023 – 11 July 2026)
- Jan Romeo Pawłowski (7 October 2026 – present)

== See also ==
- Irish Catholic Bishops' Conference
