= Silvano Maria Tomasi =

Italian cardinal

His Eminence Silvano Maria Tomasi C.S.
- Cardinal; Special Delegate to the Knights of Malta; Apostolic Nuncio Emeritus to the United Nations in Geneva
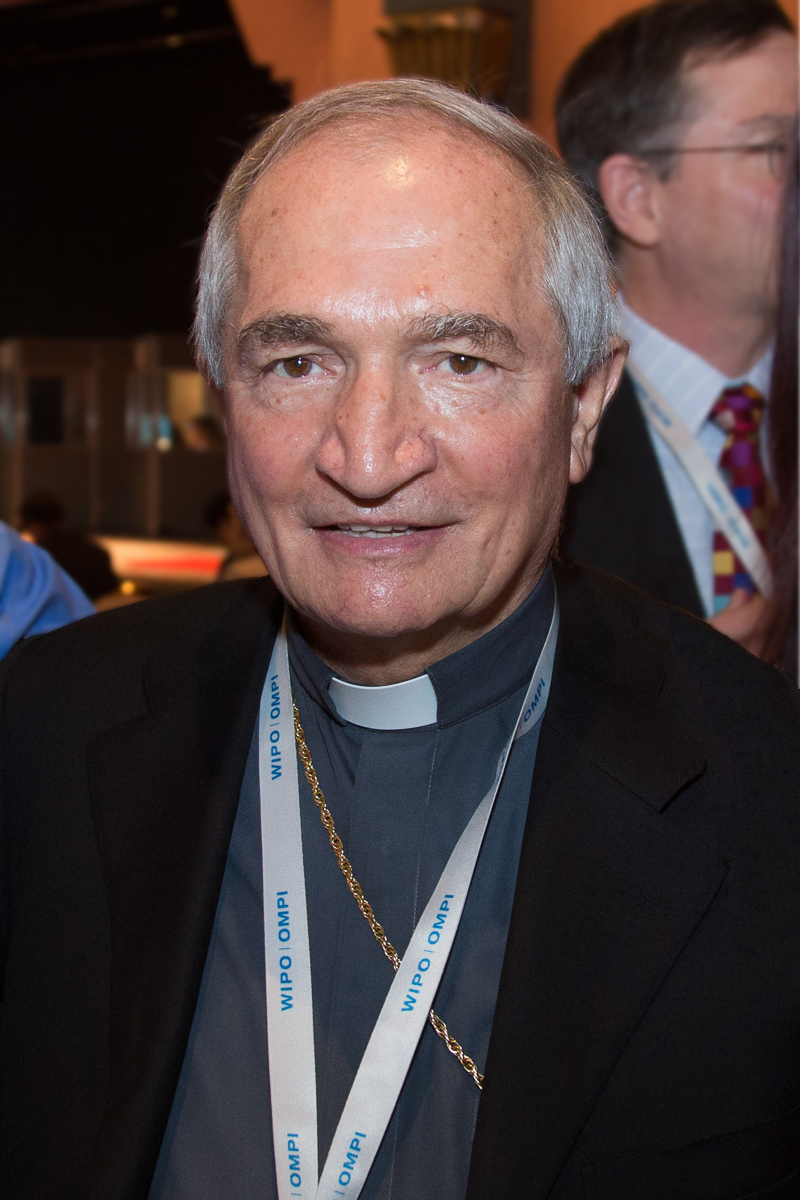
- Tomasi in Marrakech.
- Church: Roman Catholic Church.
- Appointed: 1 November 2020
- Retired: 13 February 2016
- Predecessor: Giovanni Angelo Becciu
- Other post: Cardinal-Deacon of San Nicola in Carcere (2020-)
- Previous posts: Representative to the International Organization for Migration (2011-16); Permanent Observer to the World Trade Organization (2003-16); Permanent Observer to the Office of the United Nations and Specialized Institutions in Geneva (2003–16); Apostolic Nuncio to Djibouti (2000-03); Titular Archbishop of Asolo (1999-2000); Apostolic Nuncio to Eritrea and Ethiopia (1996-2003); Apostolic Delegate to Djibouti (1996-2000); Titular Archbishop of Cercina (1996-99); Secretary of the Pontifical Council for the Pastoral Care of Migrants and Itinerant People (1989-96)

Orders
- Ordination: 31 May 1965 by Joseph Maria Pernicone
- Consecration: 17 August 1996 by Angelo Sodano
- Created cardinal: 28 November 2020 by Francis
- Rank: Cardinal-Deacon

Personal details
- Born: Silvano Maria Tomasi; 12 October 1940 (age 85) Casoni di Mussolente, Kingdom of Italy
- Denomination: Roman Catholic
- Education: Fordham University
- Motto: Cum libertate justitia
- Coat of arms

Styles of Silvano Tomasi
- Reference style: His Eminence
- Spoken style: Your Eminence
- Religious style: Cardinal
- Informal style: Cardinal

Silvano Maria Tomasi C.S. (born 12 October 1940) is an Italian prelate of the Catholic Church who has served as the Special Delegate to the Sovereign Military Order of Malta since 1 November 2020. He was the Permanent Observer of the Holy See to the United Nations in Geneva from 2003 to 2016. He previously worked in the Roman Curia, became an archbishop in 1996, and represented the Holy See as an apostolic nuncio in Africa from 1996 to 2003.

Pope Francis raised him to the rank of cardinal on 28 November 2020.

== Early life ==
He was born in Casoni di Mussolente, Italy. On 31 May 1965 he was ordained as priest of the Congregation of the Missionaries of St. Charles (Scalabrini). He earned his Ph.D. in sociology from Fordham University. From 1970 to 1974 he was assistant professor of sociology at the City University of New York and the New School for Social Research. He co-founded the Center for Migration Studies, a think tank based in New York, and he founded and edited the journal International Migration Review. In 1973 he told the New York Times that poor Italian immigrants in New York did not take advantage of government assistance programs as they feared "humiliation". He also authored a book on the historic legacy of New York's Italian parishes. From 1983 to 1987, he was Director of the newly created Office for the Pastoral Care of Migrants and Refugees of the United States Conference of Catholic Bishops.

== Diplomatic career ==
On 27 June 1989 Pope John Paul II appointed him Secretary of the Pontifical Council for the Pastoral Care of Migrants and Itinerant Peoples. He was named titular Archbishop of Cercina and Apostolic Nuncio to Eritrea and Ethiopia on 27 June 1996, consecrated on 17 August 1996 by Cardinal Angelo Sodano, and named Apostolic Delegate to Djibouti on 1 October 1996. He was transferred to the titular see of Acelum on 24 April 1999. His title changed to Apostolic Nuncio to Djibouti on 23 December 2000.

=== Geneva role ===
On 10 June 2003, Tomasi was appointed Permanent Observer of the Holy See to the United Nations in Geneva.

He was widely criticised in September 2009 following a speech in which he praised the Catholic Church's record on child sex abuse in comparison with that of other organisations by arguing that "Of all priests involved in the abuses, 80 to 90 percent belong to this sexual orientation minority which is sexually engaged with adolescent boys between the ages of 11 and 17". He also claimed that "As the Catholic church has been busy cleaning its own house, it would be good if other institutions and authorities, where the major part of abuses are reported, could do the same and inform the media about it."

Tomasi "encouraged passage of an international protocol that would give children a direct line of communication to local and international authorities when they are victims of violence or their rights are violated", saying that the measure "will become a significant instrument of the human rights system." The document would add to the protections provided in the United Nations Convention on the Rights of the Child. Speaking on 8 June 2011 at the U.N. International Labor Conference in Geneva, Archbishop Tomasi urged that all involved in "the burgeoning and mercurial economic system" work to foster fundamental principles that ensure respect for the common good and protection of the most vulnerable.

In 2014 the U.N. Committee on the Rights of the Child issued a report described as "a scathing indictment of the Vatican’s handling of child sexual abuse cases involving clerics, releasing a report that included criticism of church teachings on homosexuality, gender equality and abortion" which was seen as an indictment of the Catholic Church's handling of child sexual abuse cases involving clerics, going beyond how the church managed abuse allegations to include criticism of its teachings on homosexuality, gender equality and abortion. Archbishop Tomasi appeared before a UN committee in Geneva. Vatican officials said they were still studying the findings, but responded angrily to what they claimed were ideologically biased recommendations. Fr Thomas Rosica claimed that the UN report wrongly singled out Catholicism. Tomasi said that he suspected pro-gay rights NGOs had influenced the committee and "reinforced an ideological line" in the UN.

Tomasi has been critical of autonomous weapons systems, stating that they can never comply with international human rights law and will make warfare less humane.

In 2014, he commented that American military action in Iraq may be necessary. He considered there to be a moral imperative for the action, and that the UN Charter justified the use of force in this circumstance.

In 2015 Tomasi said jihadists were committing "genocide" and must be stopped, preferably without violence but using force if necessary.

Tomasi retired from the diplomatic service upon the announcement of the appointment of his successor in Geneva on 13 February 2016. He retains the title "Apostolic Nuncio". In the second half of 2016, he managed the reorganization of several offices of the Roman Curia to form the new Dicastery for Promoting Integral Human Development.

== Cardinal ==
On 25 October 2020, Pope Francis announced he would raise him to the rank of cardinal at a consistory scheduled for 28 November 2020. At that consistory, Pope France made him Cardinal-Deacon of San Nicola in Carcere.

On 1 November 2020, Pope Francis appointed Tomasi his Special Delegate to the Sovereign Military Order of Malta.

== See also ==
- Cardinals created by Pope Francis
- List of heads of the diplomatic missions of the Holy See

Diplomatic posts
Preceded by Patrick Coveney	Apostolic Nuncio to Ethiopia; 27 June 1996 – 10 June 2003	Succeeded by Ramiro Moliner Inglés
Preceded by Patrick Coveney	Apostolic Nuncio to Eritrea; 27 June 1996 – 10 June 2003	Succeeded by Dominique Mamberti
Preceded by Patrick Coveney	Apostolic Delegate to Djibouti; 27 June 1996 – 23 December 2000	Delegation promoted to Nunciature
New title	Apostolic Nuncio to Djibouti; 23 December 2000 – 10 June 2003	Succeeded by Ramiro Moliner Inglés
Preceded by Diarmuid Martin	Permanent Observer of the Holy See to the World Trade Organization; 10 June 2003 – 13 February 2016	Succeeded by Ivan Jurkovič
Preceded by Diarmuid Martin	Permanent Observer of the Holy See to the United Nations in Geneva; 10 June 2003 – 13 February 2016	Succeeded by Ivan Jurkovič
Preceded by Position created	Representative to the International Organization for Migration; 2011 – 13 February 2016	Succeeded by Ivan Jurkovič
Catholic Church titles
Preceded by József Zágon	Secretary of the Pontifical Council for the Pastoral Care of Migrants and Itinerant People; 27 June 1989 – 27 June 1996	Succeeded by Francesco Gioia
Preceded by Marin Srakić	Titular Archbishop of Cercina; 27 June 1996 – 24 April 1999	Succeeded by Angelo Mottola
Preceded by Carlo Fanton	Titular Archbishop of Acelum; 24 April 1999 – 28 November 2020	Succeeded by Juan José Salaverry Villarreal
Preceded by Giovanni Angelo Becciu	Special Delegate to the Knights of Malta; 1 November 2020 –	Incumbent
Preceded by Zenon Grocholewski	Cardinal-Deacon of San Nicola in Carcere; 28 November 2020 –	Incumbent
