= Juliusz Janusz =

Polish prelate of the Catholic Church (born 1944)

His Excellency, The Most Reverend Juliusz Janusz
- Apostolic Nuncio emeritus of Slovenia; Apostolic Delegate emeritus to Kosovo; Titular Archbishop of Caprulae
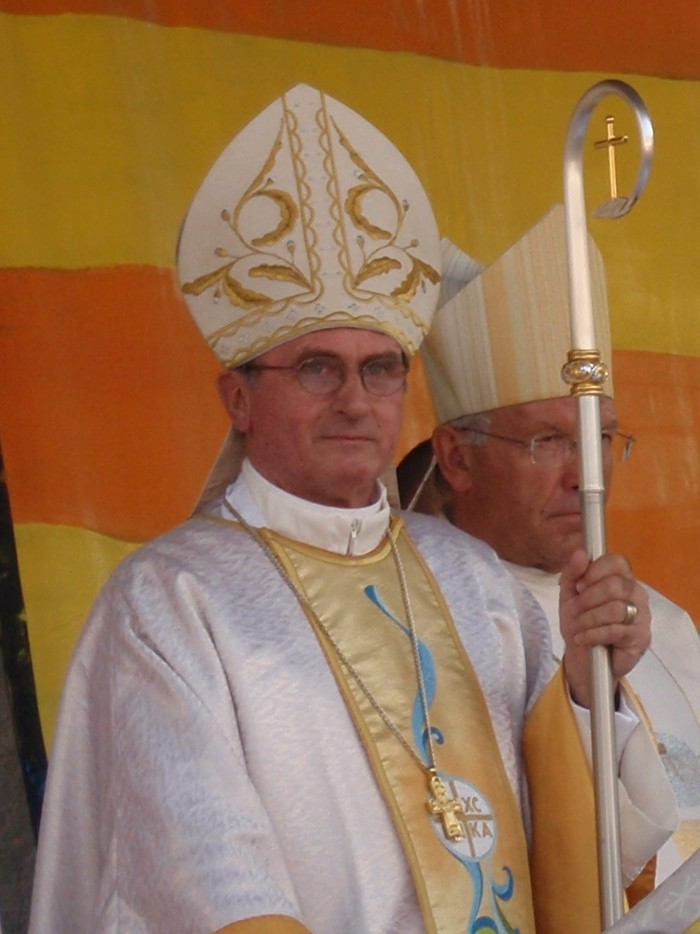
- Juliusz Janusz in 2011
- Appointed: 10 February 2011
- Retired: 21 September 2018
- Predecessor: Santos Abril y Castelló
- Successor: Jean-Marie Speich
- Other post: Titular Archbishop of Caprulae
- Previous posts: Apostolic Nuncio to Hungary (2003-2011); Apostolic Nuncio to Mozambique (1998-2003); Apostolic Nuncio to Rwanda (1995-1998); Chargé d’affaires to China (1992-1995)

Orders
- Ordination: 19 March 1967 by Karol Józef Wojtyła
- Consecration: 8 May 1995 by Angelo Sodano, Franciszek Macharski, and Francis Arinze

Personal details
- Born: March 17, 1944 (age 82) Łyczana, Poland

Styles of Juliusz Janusz
- Reference style: His Excellency; The Most Reverend
- Spoken style: Your Excellency
- Religious style: Archbishop

Juliusz Janusz (born 17 March 1944) is a Polish prelate of the Catholic Church who has spent his career in the diplomatic service of the Holy See. He has been an archbishop and held the position of Apostolic Nuncio from 1995 until he retired in 2018.

== Biography ==
Juliusz Janusz was born on 17 March 1944 in Łyczana, Poland.

He was ordained a priest on 19 March 1967 by Karol Wojtyła, Archbishop of Krakow, later Pope John Paul II.

== Diplomatic career ==
He went to Rome with the intention of earning a degree in canon law but, at Wojtyła's urging, entered the Pontifical Ecclesiastical Academy to prepare for a career as a diplomat. Pope Paul VI gave him his first assignment in the diplomatic service of the Holy See in the Nunciature to Thailand, and he then filled positions in Denmark, Sweden, Finland, Norway, Iceland and Greenland, West and East Germany, Brazil, the Netherlands, Hungary and Taiwan, where he was chargé d’affaires for three years.

On 25 March 1995, Pope John Paul II appointed him titular archbishop of Caprulae and Apostolic Nuncio to Rwanda. He received his episcopal consecration from Cardinal Angelo Sodano on 8 May. John Paul named him Apostolic Nuncio to Mozambique on 26 September 1998 and then to Hungary on 9 April 2003.

On 10 February 2011, Pope Benedict XVI appointed him Apostolic Nuncio to Slovenia and Apostolic Delegate to Kosovo. Because the independent status of Kosovo was still a matter of dispute, his appointment—the first time the Holy See had assigned a diplomat there—was accompanied by an explanatory note: "The mission of an Apostolic Delegate is not of a diplomatic nature but responds to the requirement to meet in an adequate way the pastoral needs of the Catholic faithful."

He retired on 21 September 2018.

== See also ==
- List of heads of the diplomatic missions of the Holy See
