= Gaetano Alibrandi =

Papal diplomat and former Personal Secretary to Pope Paul VI

Styles of Gaetano Alibrandi
- Reference style: The Most Reverend
- Spoken style: Your Excellency
- Religious style: Monsignor
- Posthumous style: not applicable

Gaetano Alibrandi (14 January 1914 – 3 July 2003) of the Roman Catholic Church was a senior papal diplomat and former Personal Secretary to Giovanni Battista Cardinal Montini (later Pope Paul VI).

== Biography ==
Born at Castiglione di Sicilia in the Province of Catania, Sicily, Alibrandi was ordained priest on 1 November 1936 and obtained a Doctorate on Divinity from the Pontifical Lateran University and a Doctorate on Civil and Canon Law. He entered the Diplomatic Corps of the Holy See in 1941, serving for five years in the Vatican Secretariat of State and was then a staff member in the apostolic nunciatures in Italy and Turkey before coming to Ireland as a counsellor at the Apostolic Nunciature for two years from 1954–6. Alibrandi later described his first Irish posting as ‘a spiritual bath.’

== Ordained Archbishop ==
In 1961 he received episcopal consecration as titular Archbishop of Binda by Fernando Cardinal Cento upon his appointment as Nuncio of Chile (1961), followed quickly by similar appointments in Lebanon (1963). As Apostolic Nuncio to Chile, he led the Chilean delegation to the Second Vatican Council.

== Nuncio to Ireland ==
He was appointed Papal Nuncio to Ireland on 19 April 1969, shortly after the outbreak of the Troubles.

This was a challenging time for the Church in Ireland then led by Cardinal William Conway as it adjusted to both the internal changes generated by the Second Vatican Council and the wider social changes. Alibrandi was ill-suited to coping with these changes and in particular the violence in Northern Ireland. It is widely assumed that he saw to it that the more overtly nationalist Tomas Ó Fiaich was appointed to Armagh in 1977 after the death of Cardinal Conway. The journalist and author Ed Moloney in his book on the IRA asserts that Alibrandi's "sympathy for Irish republicanism was a constant source of friction between the government in London, which resented Alibrandi's perceived interference in Northern Ireland's affairs, and the Vatican."

Alibrani played a major role in the 1971 decision by the Vatican to accept the resignation of John Charles McQuaid as archbishop of Dublin (to the shock of McQuaid, who expected that he would be allowed to remain for some time after the normal retirement age of 75).

In many of the episcopal appointments made while Alibrandi was nuncio, he favoured doctrinally 'sound', right-of-centre priests and in the case of the Archdiocese of Dublin picked two priests Kevin McNamara and Desmond Connell who were notably ill-suited. In a profile of the Archbishop at the time of his retirement T.P. O'Mahony observed in The Tablet "although he rarely gave interviews, and never overtly intervened in policy-making or in public controversies, it is beyond dispute that Archbishop Alibrandi wielded considerable influence behind the scenes."

The respected academic and church historian Dermot Keogh assessing this period argues that "there was a general view that the best candidates had not been appointed...that a number were not up to the job, that most of the appointees shared a defensive attitude to matters of church and state. The Church Confronts Modernity: Catholicism Since 1950 in the United States, Ireland, and Quebec

He had “a very testy relationship with three Taoisigh – Jack Lynch, Liam Cosgrave and Garret FitzGerald”. It was reported in September 2012 during the second Dr Garret FitzGerald Memorial Lecture at University College Cork by Seán Donlon, former secretary general at the Department of Foreign Affairs, that "It came to our [Department of Foreign Affairs] attention that a substantial amount in three bank accounts in Dublin [held by the archbishop] were way in excess of what was needed to run the nunciature. The source [of the money] appeared to be South America." Donlon went on to say "Because of its size, we thought it appropriate to ask if the funds belonged to the Holy See". When contacted for an answer, Dr Alibrandi "quickly answered ‘no’ and that they belonged to ‘family’. When it was pointed out to him that the money was then liable under Irish taxation law to DIRT, he said he would retire shortly and the accounts would be closed."

Catholic Church titles
Preceded by Opilio Rossi	Apostolic Nuncio to Chile; 5 October 1961–9 December 1963	Succeeded by Egano Righi-Lambertini
Preceded by Egano Righi-Lambertini	Apostolic Nuncio to Lebanon; 9 December 1963–19 April 1969	Succeeded by Alfredo Bruniera
Preceded by Joseph Francis McGeough	Apostolic Nuncio to Ireland; 19 April 1969–1989	Succeeded by Emanuele Gerada
