= Apostolic Nunciature to Sri Lanka =

Diplomatic Mission of the Holy See in Sri Lanka

- Location: Colombo 00700, Sri Lanka
- Address: 220 Bauddhaloka Mawatha, Colombo 00700, Sri Lanka
- Coordinates: 6°53′56.9″N 79°51′54.3″E
- Apostolic Nuncio: Archbishop Brian Udaigwe

The Apostolic Nunciature to Sri Lanka is the diplomatic mission of the Holy See to Sri Lanka. It is located in Colombo. The Apostolic Nuncio is Archbishop Brian Udaigwe, who was named to the position by Pope Francis on 13 June 2020.

The Apostolic Nunciature to the Democratic Socialist Republic of Sri Lanka is the embassy of the Vatican City State which is a sovereign independent country and it also represents the Pope in his capacity as Head of the Universal Catholic church, with the rank of an embassy. The nuncio serves both as the ambassador of the Holy See to the President of Sri Lanka, and as delegate and point-of-contact between the Catholic hierarchy in Sri Lanka and the Pope.

== List of papal representatives ==
- Luciano Storero (22 November 1969 – 24 December 1970)
- Carlo Curis (14 July 1971 – 30 March 1978)
- Nicola Rotunno (13 April 1978 – 30 August 1983)
- Ambrose Battista De Paoli (23 September 1983 – 6 February 1988)
- François Bacqué (17 June 1988 – 7 June 1994)
- Osvaldo Padilla (1994 – 22 August 1998)
- Thomas Yeh Sheng-nan (10 November 1998 – 22 April 2004)
- Mario Zenari (10 May 2004 – 30 December 2008)
- Joseph Spiteri (21 February 2009 – 1 October 2013)
- Pierre Nguyên Van Tot (22 March 2014 – 2 January 2020)
- Brian Udaigwe (13 June 2020 – 12 April 2025)
- Andrzej Józwowicz (31 January 2026) – present)

== See also ==
- Holy See – Sri Lanka relations
