= Apostolic Delegation to Somalia =

Diplomatic representative of the Holy See in Africa

The Apostolic Delegation to Somalia represents the interests of the Holy See in Somalia to officials of the Catholic Church, civil society, and government offices. The Holy See and the government of Somalia have not established diplomatic relations and the position of Apostolic Delegate to Somalia is not a diplomatic one, though the Delegate is a member of the diplomatic service of the Holy See. The Delegate normally holds the title Apostolic Nuncio to Ethiopia and resides in Addis Ababa, Ethiopia.

The Holy See managed its affairs in Somalia through an Apostolic Delegation to the Red Sea Region established in 1969. Pope John Paul II created the Delegation to Somalia on 26 March 1992 as part of the reorganization of that delegation into the Delegation to the Arabian Peninsula and several country-specific bodies.

== Papal representatives to Somalia ==
Delegates to the Red Sea Region

- Ubaldo Calabresi (3 July 1969 – 5 January 1978)
- Giovanni Moretti (13 March 1978 – 10 July 1984)
- Luis Robles Díaz (16 February 1985 – 13 March 1990)
- Erwin Josef Ender (15 March 1990 – 9 July 1997)
  - Delegation to Somalia established on 26 March 1992 (Note: The Holy See Press Office dates Ender's assumption of the title Delegate to Somalia to 25 May 1993.)

Delegates to Somalia

- Marco Dino Brogi (13 December 1997 – 5 February 2002)
- Dominique Mamberti (18 May 2002 – 17 January 2004)
- Ramiro Moliner Inglés (17 January 2004 – 26 July 2008)
- George Panikulam (24 October 2008 – 14 June 2014)
- Luigi Bianco (10 September 2014 – 4 February 2019)
- Antoine Camilleri (31 October 2019 – 20 May 2024)
- Brian Udaigwe (3 November 2025 – present)
