= Apostolic Delegation to Kosovo =

Diplomatic post of the Holy See

- Address: Krekov trg 8, 1000 Ljubljana, Slovenia
- Apostolic Nuncio: Luigi Bianco

The Apostolic Delegation to Kosovo represents the interests of the Holy See in Kosovo to officials of the Catholic Church, civil society, and government offices. The Holy See and the government of Kosovo have not established diplomatic relations and the position of Apostolic Delegate to Kosovo is not a diplomatic one, though the Delegate is a member of the diplomatic service of the Holy See. The Apostolic Delegate normally holds the title Apostolic Nuncio to Slovenia and resides in Ljubljana, Slovenia.

Kosovo unilaterally declared independence from Serbia on 17 February 2008 after a century of rule by Yugoslavia, the short-lived State Union of Serbia and Montenegro, and Serbia, subject to a period of United Nations administration. The Holy See has not formally recognized the independence of Kosovo.

Kosovo established its own Special Mission to the Holy See in January 2024.

== Status ==
As the independent status of Kosovo was still a matter of dispute when the Holy See appointed its first delegate with responsibility for that area alone, the appointment was accompanied by an explanatory note: "In this regard, it should be pointed out that the appointment of an Apostolic Delegate falls within the organizational functions of the structure of the Catholic Church and hence has a purely intra-ecclesial character, being completely distinct from considerations regarding juridical and territorial situations or any other question inherent to the diplomatic activity of the Holy See. The mission of an Apostolic Delegate is not of a diplomatic nature but responds to the requirement to meet in an adequate way the pastoral needs of the Catholic faithful."

== Representatives of the Holy See in Kosovo ==
Apostolic Delegates to Kosovo

- Juliusz Janusz (10 February 2011 – 21 September 2018)
- Jean-Marie Speich (19 March 2019 – 12 April 2025)
- Luigi Bianco (20 May 2025 – present)

== See also ==
- Holy See's reaction to the 2008 Kosovo declaration of independence
