= Apostolic Nunciature to Slovenia =

Diplomatic mission of the Holy See in Europe

- Address: Krekov trg 8, 1000 Ljubljana, Slovenia
- Apostolic Nuncio: Luigi Bianco

The Apostolic Nunciature to Slovenia is an ecclesiastical office of the Catholic Church in Slovenia. It is a diplomatic post of the Holy See, whose representative is called the Apostolic Nuncio with the rank of an ambassador.

The Holy See was one of the first nations to recognize Slovenia as an independent nation and appointed its first representative in 1995. On 3 February 2016, Secretary of State Cardinal Pietro Parolin inaugurated the first permanent premises of the Apostolic Nunciature in Ljubljana.

The Apostolic Nuncio to Slovenia is usually also the Apostolic Delegate to Kosovo upon his appointment to said nation.

== Representatives of the Holy See to Slovenia ==
Apostolic nuncios

- Pier Luigi Celata (24 June 1992 – 6 February 1995)
- Edmond Farhat (26 July 1995 – 11 December 2001)
- Marian Oleś (11 December 2001 – 1 May 2002)
- Giuseppe Leanza (15 May 2002 – 22 February 2003)
- Santos Abril y Castelló (9 April 2003 – 9 January 2011)
- Juliusz Janusz (10 February 2011 – 21 September 2018)
- Jean-Marie Speich (19 March 2019 – 12 April 2025)
- Luigi Bianco (20 May 2025 – present)

== See also ==
- Foreign relations of the Holy See
- List of diplomatic missions of the Holy See
