= Giovanni Battista della Pietra =

Italian archbishop

Giovanni Battista della Pietra, SJ (17 October 1871 – 26 August 1940) was an Italian Jesuit of the Catholic Church who became an archbishop and worked in the diplomatic service of the Holy See and then returned to his normal religious life.

== Biography ==
Giovanni Battista della Pietra was born on 17 October 1871 in Comeglians, Italy. He was ordained a priest of the Society of Jesus on 18 September 1904.

On 9 March 1927, Pope Pius XI named him titular archbishop of Chalcedon and Apostolic Delegate to Albania. He received his episcopal consecration on 19 March 1927 from Cardinal Willem van Rossum.

In Albania he sought to promote conversions among the Orthodox and develop missions for Latin rite Catholics, while contending with the government's promotion of a national Orthodox church. He also served as Apostolic Administrator of some dioceses.

After he made repeated requests to the Congregation for the Propagation of the Faith, the Jesuit superior general, and the pope, della Pietra was allowed to return to his earlier religious life in 1936, without any of the honors associated with the rank of bishop. He became head of the postulates house in Lonigo and then rector of the diocesan seminary in Fiume. His gravestone in the Fiume cemetery identifies him as a priest, not a bishop.

Della Pietra died on 26 August 1940 at the age of 68.
