= Łyczana =

- Village
- Location within Poland
- Coordinates: 49°42′N 20°48′E
- Country: Poland
- Voivodeship: Lesser Poland
- County: Nowy Sącz
- Gmina: Korzenna
- Elevation: 1 m (3.3 ft)

Łyczana [wɨˈt͡ʂana] is a village in the administrative district of Gmina Korzenna, within Nowy Sącz County, Lesser Poland Voivodeship, in southern Poland.
