= Brian Udaigwe =

Cameroon-born Nigerian prelate

His Excellency, The Most Reverend Brian Udaigwe
- Apostolic Nuncio of Ethiopia and Djibouti, Apostolic Delegate to Somalia, Apostolic Representative to the African Union; Titular Archbishop of Suelli
- Appointed: 12 April 2025
- Predecessor: Antoine Camilleri)
- Other post: Titular Archbishop of Suelli
- Previous posts: Apostolic Nuncio of Sri Lanka (2020-2025); Apostolic Nuncio to Benin and Togo (2013-2020)

Orders
- Ordination: 2 May 1992
- Consecration: 27 April 2013 by Tarcisio Bertone, Marc Ouellet, and Fernando Filoni

Personal details
- Born: July 19, 1964 (age 61) Tiko, Cameroon
- Motto: Nolite timere (Do not be afraid)

Styles of Brian Udaigwe
- Reference style: His Excellency; The Most Reverend
- Spoken style: Your Excellency
- Religious style: Archbishop

Brian Udaigwe is a Cameroon-born Nigerian prelate of the Catholic Church who works in the diplomatic service of the Holy See.

== Biography ==
Brian Udaigwe was born in Tiko in southwest Cameroon on 19 July 1964. He was ordained a priest of the Diocese of Orlu, Nigeria, on 2 May 1992.

== Diplomatic career ==
He attended the Pontifical Ecclesiastical Academy and entered the diplomatic service of the Holy See on 1 July 1994. He served in Zimbabwe, Ivory Coast, Haiti, Bulgaria, and Thailand. Beginning in January 2008, he served in the United Kingdom.

On 22 February 2013, Pope Benedict XVI named him the apostolic nuncio and titular archbishop of Suelli. In the same year, Pope Francis appointed him apostolic nuncio to Benin. He received his episcopal consecration on 27 April from Cardinal Tarcisio Bertone, SDB, Secretary of State. He presented his credentials in Benin on 24 June. On 16 July 2013, he was named Nuncio to Togo as well. He presented his credentials there on 26 September.

On 13 June 2020, he was named Apostolic Nuncio to Sri Lanka. On 12 April 2025, he was appointed as nuncio to Ethiopia. On 3 November of the same year, he was given the additional assignments as nuncio to Djibouti, Apostolic Delegate to Somalia and Apostolic Representative to the African Union.

== See also ==
- List of heads of the diplomatic missions of the Holy See
