= Luigi Bianco =

Italian priest (born 1960)

His Excellency, The Most Reverend Luigi Bianco
- Apostolic Nuncio to Slovenia and Apostolic Delegate to Kosovo
- Appointed: 20 May 2025
- Predecessor: Jean-Marie Speich
- Other post: Titular Archbishop of Falerone
- Previous posts: Apostolic Nuncio to Honduras (2009-2014); Apostolic Nuncio to Ethiopia, Djibouti, Apostolic Delegate to Somalia and special representative to the African Union (2014-2019); Apostolic Nuncio of Uganda (2019-2025)

Orders
- Ordination: 30 March 1985
- Consecration: 25 April 2009 by Tarcisio Bertone, Alceste Catella, and Luciano Pacomio

Personal details
- Born: March 3, 1960 (age 66) Montemagno, Piedmont, Italy

Styles of Luigi Bianco
- Reference style: His Excellency; The Most Reverend
- Spoken style: Your Excellency
- Religious style: Archbishop

Luigi Bianco (born 3 March 1960) is an Italian prelate of the Catholic Church who has spent his career in the diplomatic service of the Holy See. He has been an apostolic nuncio with the rank of archbishop since 2009.

== Biography ==
Luigi Bianco was born 3 March 1960 in Montemagno, Italy. He was ordained a priest of the Diocese of Casale Monferrato on 30 March 1985. He earned a doctorate in canon law from the Pontifical Urban University in Rome.

== Diplomatic career ==
He entered the diplomatic service of the Holy See on 1 July 1989. He served in the various Nunciatures, including in Italy, Egypt, Argentina, Croatia and Spain.

On 12 January 2009, he was appointed Apostolic Nuncio to Honduras and titular archbishop of Falerone. He was consecrated bishop on 25 April 2009 at Sant’Evasio Cathedral, Casale Monferrato, by Cardinal Tarcisio Bertone.

On 12 July 2014, he was appointed Apostolic Nuncio to Ethiopia. On 10 September 2014, he was appointed Apostolic Nuncio to Djibouti, Apostolic Delegate to Somalia and special representative to the African Union.

On 4 February 2019, he was appointed by Pope Francis, as Papal nuncio to Uganda. He took up office in Kampala, Uganda on Monday 8 April 2019.

On 20 May 2025, he was appointed by Pope Leo XIV, as papal nuncio to Slovenia and apostolic delegate to Kosovo.

Bianco speaks English, French, Italian and Spanish.

== See also ==
- Roman Catholicism in Uganda
- List of heads of the diplomatic missions of the Holy See

Preceded by Giuseppe Betori	Titular Archbishop of Falerone; 12 January 2009 - present	Succeeded by Incumbent
