= George Panikulam =

Indian bishop

His Grace, The Most Reverend George Panikulam
- Apostolic Nuncio emeritus to Uruguay; Titular Archbishop of Caudium
- Appointed: 14 June 2014
- Retired: 26 October 2017
- Predecessor: Anselmo Guido Pecorari
- Successor: Martin Krebs
- Other post: Titular Archbishop of Caudium
- Previous posts: Apostolic Nuncio to Ethiopia, Djibouti, Apostolic Delegate to Somalia and special representative to the African Union (2008–2014); Apostolic Nuncio to Mozambique (2003–2008); Apostolic Nuncio to Honduras (1999–2003)

Orders
- Ordination: 11 March 1967 by George Alapatt
- Consecration: 6 January 2000 by Pope John Paul II, Giovanni Battista Re and Marcello Zago

Personal details
- Born: George Panikulam; 26 October 1942 (age 83) Kerala, India

Styles of George Panikulam
- Reference style: His Grace; The Most Reverend
- Spoken style: Your Grace
- Religious style: Archbishop

George Panikulam (born 26 October 1942) is a bishop of the Syro-Malabar Catholic Church who spent his career in the diplomatic service of the Holy See. He was given the title of nuncio in 1999 and consecrated a bishop in 2000. He retired in 2017.

== Biography ==
He was born in Puthenchira, Kerala, India, on 26 October 1942. He studied at the minor seminary in Thope, Thrissur, and St. Joseph's Pontifical Seminary in Aluva. He was ordained a priest on 11 March 1967 by Archbishop George Alapatt. He continued his studies in Rome, earning a doctorate in sacred scripture and a licentiate in canon law and theology.

== Diplomatic career ==
He studied at the Pontifical Ecclesiastical Academy to prepare for a diplomat's career beginning in 1975.

He was appointed Titular Archbishop of Caudium and Apostolic Nuncio to Honduras on 4 December 1999. He was consecrated a bishop on 6 January 2000 by Pope John Paul II.

He was appointed Apostolic Nuncio to Mozambique on 3 July 2003.

On 24 October 2008, he was named Apostolic Nuncio to Ethiopia and Apostolic Delegate to Somalia. He was given additional responsibilities as Apostolic Nuncio to Djibouti on 18 December 2008.

He was named Apostolic Nuncio to Uruguay on 14 June 2014.

He retired in October 2017 at the age of 75.

== See also ==
- List of heads of the diplomatic missions of the Holy See
