= Diocese of Newport and Menevia =

Titular see and former diocese in Wales and England

The Roman Catholic Diocese of Newport (and Menevia) was the Latin Catholic precursor (1840-1916) in Wales and southwest England of the present Roman Catholic Archdiocese of Cardiff, with see in Newport, Wales, and was revived as Latin titular see.

== History ==
- Established in 1840 as Apostolic Vicariate of the Welsh District, on Anglo-Welsh territories (the whole of Wales and the English county of Herefordshire) canonically split off from the Apostolic Vicariate of the Western District.
- Elevated on 29 September 1850 as Diocese of Newport and Menevia, a suffragan in the ecclesiastical province of the Roman Catholic Archdiocese of Birmingham, having lost northern, English territory to establish the Roman Catholic Diocese of Shrewsbury. It had its pro-cathedral at Belmont Abbey in Herefordshire (England), built from 15 February 1854 by Francis Richard Wegg-Prosser, a landowner converted in 1852, followed by Benedictine monastic buildings from 1857, since 21 November 1859 a priory, on 4 September 1860 is consecrated as the cathedral priory The abbey continues to be enlarged (chancel extended in 1865).
- Renamed on 4 July 1895 as Diocese of Newport (Latin Neoportus), having lost further (Welsh) territory to establish the Apostolic Vicariate of Wales, covering Glamorgan, Monmouth (both Welsh) and Herefordshire (England).
- Suppressed on 7 February 1916, its canonical territory being used to establish the Metropolitan Roman Catholic Archdiocese of Cardiff.

== Episcopal ordinaries ==
(all Roman Rite, both born in England)

Apostolic Vicar of the Welsh District

- Thomas Joseph Brown, Benedictine Order (O.S.B.) (1840.06.05 – 1850.09.29 see below), Titular Bishop of Apollonia (1840.06.05 – 1850.09.29)

Suffragan Bishops of Newport and Menevia

- Thomas Joseph Brown, O.S.B. (1850.09.29 – death 1880.04.12)
- John Cuthbert Hedley, O.S.B. (1881.02.18 – 1895 see below), succeeding as previous

Auxiliary Bishop of Newport and Menevia (1873.07.22 – 1881.02.18) and Titular Bishop of Cæsaropolis (1873.07.22 – 1881.02.18)

Suffragan Bishops of Newport

- John Cuthbert Hedley, O.S.B. (see above 1895 – death 1915.11.11).

== Titular see ==
The pre-Cardiff diocese was nominally restored in 1969 as Titular bishopric of Newport (Latin Neoportus).

It has had the following incumbents, of the fitting episcopal (lowest) rank, with an archiepiscopal exception :

- Titular Archbishop Fulton John Sheen (1969.10.06 – death 1979.12.09), as emeritate; previously Titular Bishop of Cæsariana (1951.05.28 – 1966.10.21) as Auxiliary Bishop of New York (NY, USA) (1951.05.28 – 1966.10.21), Bishop of Rochester (USA) (1966.10.21 – retired 1969.10.06)
- Howard George Tripp (1979.12.20 – death 2022.10.03), as Auxiliary Bishop of Southwark (England) (1979.12.20 – emeritate 2004.01.07).
- Michael Izen

== Sources and external links ==
- GCatholic - titular see ^{[self-published]}
