= Leone Giovanni Battista Nigris =

Italian prelate

Leone Giovanni Battista Nigris (27 August 1884 – 21 September 1964) was an Italian prelate of the Catholic Church who worked in Albania. He became an archbishop in 1938.

== Biography ==
Leone Giovanni Battista Nigris was born on 27 August 1884 in Ampezzo, Italy. He was ordained a priest on 18 July 1909. He devoted the next twenty years to teaching and education administration.

On 18 August 1938, Pope Pius XI appointed him titular archbishop of Philippi and Apostolic Delegate to Albania. (Note: Catholic Hierarchy incorrectly identifies Nigris as Apostolic "Nuncio" to Albania.)

He received his episcopal consecration on 25 September 1938 from Giuseppe Nogara, Archbishop of Udine.

On 11 November 1939, Pope Pius XII named him Apostolic Administrator of Southern Albania. In this traditional Orthodox rather than Catholic region of Albania he guided Catholic missionaries to a less aggressive approach to conversions, advising the less aggressive approach of persuasion by providing models of virtuous life rather than through argument; he was suspicious of mass conversions. He feared the Italian occupation of Albania in 1939 would harden sectarian divisions.

In 1945 the new Communist government, intent on establishing a national church without ties to Rome, had him arrested an expelled from Albania as persona non grata.

Returned to Rome, he became secretary of the Congregation for the Propagation of the Faith.

He died in Rome on 21 September 1964 at the age of 80.
