= Apostolic Nunciature to Rwanda =

Diplomatic Mission of the Holy See in Rwanda

- Location: Kigali, Rwanda
- Address: KN 7 Ave, Kigali, Rwanda
- Coordinates: 1°57′27.5″S 30°03′53.4″E
- Apostolic Nuncio: Arnaldo Catalan

The Apostolic Nunciature to Rwanda the diplomatic mission of the Holy See to Rwanda. It is located in Kigali. The current Apostolic Nuncio is Archbishop Arnaldo S. Catalan, who was named to the position by Pope Francis on 31 January 2022.

The Apostolic Nunciature to the Republic of Rwanda is an ecclesiastical office of the Catholic Church in Argentina, with the rank of an embassy. The nuncio serves both as the ambassador of the Holy See to the President of Rwanda, and as delegate and point-of-contact between the Catholic hierarchy in Rwanda and the Pope.

== History ==
After representing its interests through a series of delegations, the Holy See established its Nunciature to Rwanda on 6 June 1964.

== Apostolic Nuncios to Rwanda since 1949 ==
- Pietro Sigismondi (16 December 1949 – 27 September 1954)
- Vito Roberti (13 October 1962 – 15 August 1965)
- Jean Émile André Marie Maury (11 June 1965 – 1967)
- Amelio Poggi (27 May 1967 – 27 November 1969)
- William Aquin Carew (27 November 1969 – 10 May 1974)
- Nicola Rotunno (7 January 1975 – 13 April 1978)
- Thomas Anthony White (27 May 1978 – 1 March 1983)
- Giovanni Battista Morandini (30 August 1983 – 12 September 1990)
- Giuseppe Bertello (12 January 1991 – March 1995)
- Juliusz Janusz (25 March 1995 – 26 September 1998)
- Salvatore Pennacchio (28 November 1998 – 20 September 2003)
- Anselmo Guido Pecorari (29 November 2003 – 17 January 2008)
- Ivo Scapolo (17 January 2008 – 15 July 2011)
- Luciano Russo (16 February 2012 – 14 June 2016)
- Andrzej Józwowicz (18 March 2017 – 28 June 2021)
- Arnaldo Catalan (31 January 2022 – present)
