= Apostolic Nunciature to Albania =

Diplomatic Mission of the Holy See

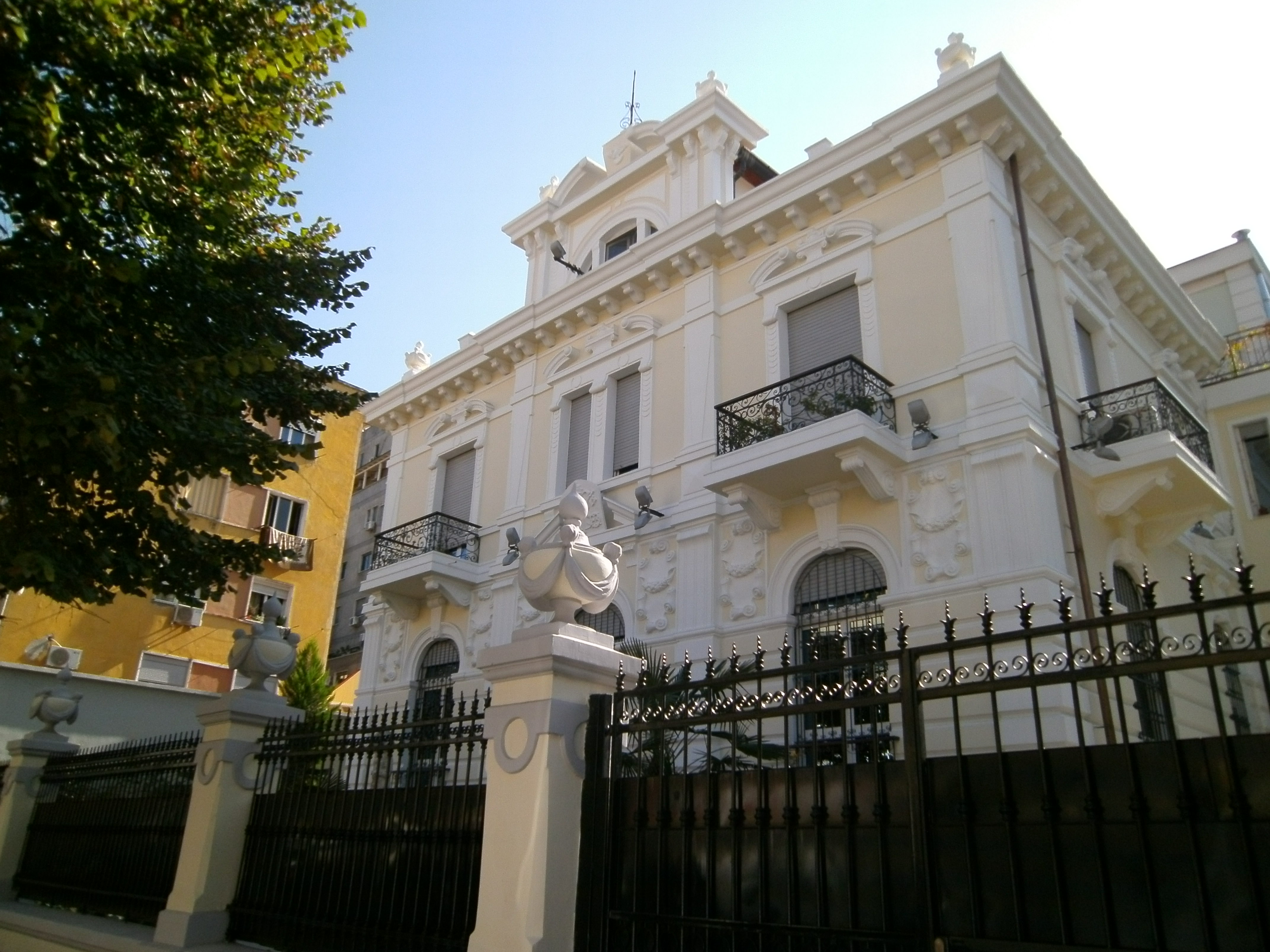
- Location: Tirana
- Apostolic Nuncio: Vacant

The Apostolic Nunciature to Albania is an ecclesiastical office of the Catholic Church in Albania. It is a diplomatic post of the Holy See, whose representative is called the Apostolic Nuncio with the rank of an ambassador.

After a gap of several decades Pope John Paul II established the Nunciature to Albania on 7 September 1991.

== Representatives of the Holy See to Albania ==
Apostolic delegates

- Ernesto Cozzi (12 November 1920 – 23 February 1926)
- Giovanni Battista della Pietra (3 March 1927 – 1934)
- Ildebrando Antoniutti (19 May 1936 – August 1936)
- Leone Giovanni Battista Nigris (18 August 1938 – 1947)

Apostolic Nuncios

- Ivan Dias (28 October 1991 – 8 November 1996)
- John Bulaitis (25 March 1997 – 26 July 2008)
- Ramiro Moliner Inglés (26 July 2008 – 1 September 2016)
- Charles John Brown (9 March 2017 – 28 September 2020)
- Luigi Bonazzi (10 December 2020 – 21 January 2025)
- Mirosław Adamczyk (14 January 2026 – present)

== See also ==
- Foreign relations of the Holy See
- List of diplomatic missions of the Holy See
