= Andrzej Józwowicz =

Apostolic nuncio (born 1965)

His Excellency, The Most Reverend Andrzej Józwowicz
- Apostolic Nuncio to Sri Lanka; Titular Archbishop of Lauriacum
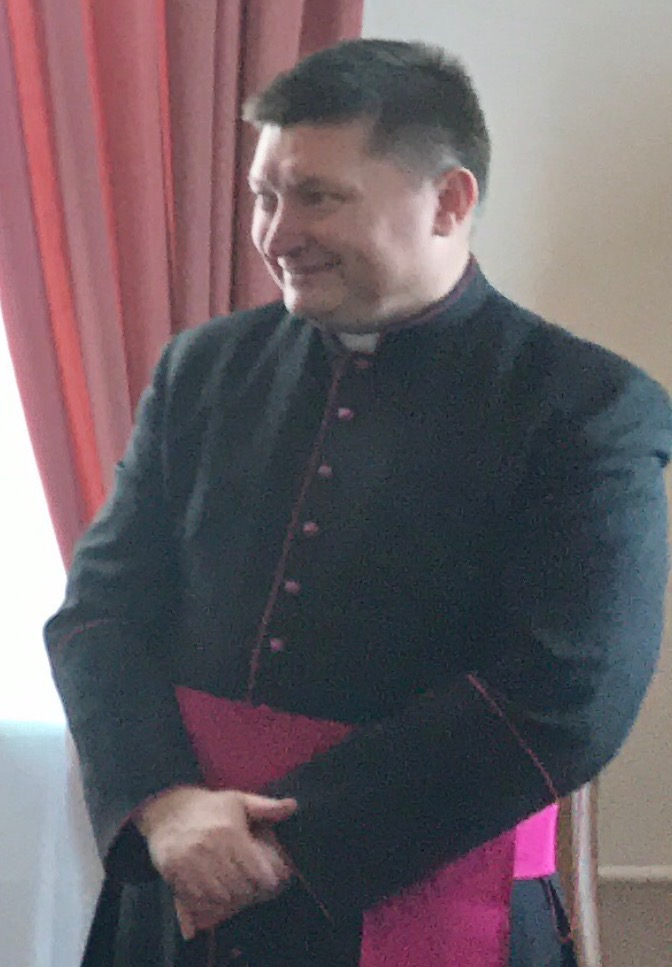
- Church: Roman Catholic Church
- Appointed: 31 January 2026
- Predecessor: Leo Boccardi
- Other post: Titular Archbishop of Lauriacum
- Previous posts: Apostolic Nuncio to Iran (2021-2026); Apostolic Nuncio to Rwanda (2017–2021)

Orders
- Ordination: 24 May 1990 by Józef Glemp
- Consecration: 27 May 2017 by Pietro Parolin

Personal details
- Born: Andrzej Józwowicz; 14 January 1965 (age 61) Boćki, Poland
- Education: Pontifical Lateran University
- Motto: Caritas Numquam Excidit
- Coat of arms

Styles of Andrzej Józwowicz
- Reference style: His Excellency; The Most Reverend
- Spoken style: Your Excellency
- Religious style: Archbishop

Andrzej Józwowicz (born 14 January 1965) is a Polish prelate of the Catholic Church who joined the diplomatic service of the Holy See in 1997 and serves as the Apostolic Nuncio to Sri Lanka. An archbishop since 2017, he was Apostolic Nuncio to Rwanda from 2017 to 2021 and Iran from 2021 to 2026.

== Biography ==
Andrzej Józwowicz was born on 14 January 1965 in Boćki, Poland. He was ordained a priest on 24 May 1990. He studied philosophy and theology in Warsaw. He earned a doctorate in canon and civil law from the Pontifical Lateran University in Rome.

== Diplomatic career ==
To prepare for a diplomat's career he entered the Pontifical Ecclesiastical Academy in 1995. He speaks Italian, French, English, Polish, Portuguese and Russian.

On 1 July 1997, he joined the Holy See's diplomatic service. He served in Mozambique, Thailand, Singapore, Cambodia, Hungary, Syria and Iran. In 2012 he was appointed secretary in the Apostolic Nunciature to Russia.

On 18 March 2017, Józwowicz was appointed Apostolic Nuncio to Rwanda by Pope Francis.

On 28 June 2021, Pope Francis named him Nuncio to Iran .

On 31 January 2026, Pope Leo XIV appointed him as nuncio to Sri Lanka.

== See also ==
- List of heads of the diplomatic missions of the Holy See
