= Pablo Puente (prelate) =

Spanish prelate of the Catholic Church (1931–2022)

His Excellency, The Most Reverend Pablo Puente Buces
- Apostolic Nuncio emeritus of Great Britain; Titular Archbishop of Macri
- Appointed: 31 July 1997
- Term ended: 23 October 2004
- Predecessor: Luigi Barbarito
- Successor: Faustino Sainz Muñoz
- Other post: Titular Archbishop of Macri
- Previous posts: Apostolic Nuncio to Kuwait and Apostolic Delegate to the Arabian Peninsula (1993–1997); Apostolic Nuncio to Lebanon (1989–1997); Apostolic Pro-Nuncio of Cape Verde, Senegal, Mali, Guinea-Bissau and Apostolic Delegate to Mauritania (1986–1989); Apostolic Pro-Nuncio of Indonesia (1980–1986)

Orders
- Ordination: 2 April 1956 by José María Eguino y Trecu
- Consecration: 25 May 1980 by Agnelo Rossi, Gabino Díaz Merchán, and Juan Antonio del Val Gallo

Personal details
- Born: 16 June 1931 Colindres, Cantabria, Spain
- Died: 4 December 2022 (aged 91)

Styles of Pablo Puente Buces
- Reference style: His Excellency; The Most Reverend
- Spoken style: Your Excellency
- Religious style: Archbishop

Pablo Puente Buces (16 June 1931 – 4 December 2022) was a Spanish prelate of the Catholic Church, who worked in the diplomatic service of the Holy See from 1962 to 2004. He became an archbishop in 1980 and held the title of Apostolic Nuncio to several countries. Diario Sur called him "a heavyweight of Vatican diplomacy".

== Biography ==
Pablo Puente was born in Colindres, Cantabria, Spain, on 16 June 1931. He earned his licentiates in philosophy in 1952 and in theology in 1956 at the Universidad Pontificia Comillas in Madrid. He was ordained a priest on 2 April 1956. He then attended the Pontifical Ecclesiastical Academy and obtained a Doctorate in Canon Law from the Pontifical Gregorian University.

Puente entered the diplomatic service of the Holy See in 1962. His first assignments were in Paraguay, the Dominican Republic, Puerto Rico, Kenya and Tanzania. In 1970 he was named Chief of the Spanish Language Section of the Secretariat of State of the Holy See.

Beginning in 1973 he worked in Lebanon and Yugoslavia. He was a member of the Holy See's delegation to the Conference on Security and Cooperation in Europe in Helsinki and in 1978 he headed the Vatican Delegation at the Minespol-II Conference of Unesco.

On 18 March 1980, Pope John Paul II appointed him titular archbishop of Macri and Apostolic Pro-Nuncio to Indonesia. He received his episcopal consecration on 25 May from Cardinal Agnelo Rossi.

On 15 March 1986, he was appointed Apostolic Pro-Nuncio to Senegal and to Cape Verde as well as Apostolic Delegate to Guinea-Bissau and Mauritania. On 12 May he was given additional responsibility as Apostolic Pro-Nuncio to Mali.

On 31 July 1989, he was named Apostolic Nuncio to Lebanon. His service in Lebanon, where he reached out to various militia groups and heads of Islamic political parties to help end the 1975-1990 Lebanese civil war, has been cited as an example of invisible Vatican diplomacy.

On 25 May 1993, he was appointed Apostolic Nuncio to Kuwait and Apostolic Delegate to the Arabian Peninsula.

On 31 July 1997 he was named Apostolic Nuncio to Great Britain. In 2001 he visited the Archdiocese of Cardiff to meet with religious and laity following the temporary replacement of the archbishop and the removal of two priests for the sexual abuse of minors.

Puente resigned as nuncio in October 2004, and on 11 December 2004, John Paul II accepted his resignation.

On 25 August 2019, Puente called for the ordination of women as Catholic priests.

Puente was a canon of the cathedral of Santander.

Puente died on 4 December 2022, at the age of 91.

== See also ==
- List of heads of the diplomatic missions of the Holy See

Catholic Church titles
Preceded by Miguel d’Aversa	Titular Archbishop of Macri; 1980–2022	Succeeded by Vacant
Preceded by Luigi Barbarito	Apostolic Nuncio to Great Britain; 1997–2004	Succeeded by Faustino Sainz Muñoz
Preceded by Erwin Josef Ender	Apostolic Delegate to Arabian Peninsula; 1993–1997	Succeeded by Antonio Maria Vegliò
Preceded by Marian Oles	Apostolic Nuncio to Kuwait; 1993–1997	Succeeded by Antonio Maria Vegliò
Preceded by Luciano Angeloni	Apostolic Nuncio to Lebanon; 1989–1997	Succeeded by Antonio Maria Vegliò
Preceded by Luigi Dossena	Apostolic Pro-Nuncio to Mali; 1986–1989	Succeeded by Antonio Maria Vegliò
Preceded by Luigi Dossena	Apostolic Delegate to Mauritania; 1986–1989	Succeeded by Giuseppe Pinto
Preceded by Luigi Dossena	Apostolic Delegate to Guinea-Bissau; 1986–1989	Succeeded by Antonio Maria Vegliò
Preceded by Luigi Dossena	Apostolic Pro-Nuncio to Senegal; 1986–1989	Succeeded by Antonio Maria Vegliò
Preceded by Luigi Dossena	Apostolic Pro-Nuncio to Cape Verde; 1986–1989	Succeeded by Antonio Maria Vegliò
