= Apostolic Nunciature to Mali =

Diplomatic post of the Holy See

The Apostolic Nunciature to Mali is the diplomatic mission of the Holy See to Mali. The Apostolic Nuncio to Mali is an ecclesiastical office of the Catholic Church in Mali, with the rank of an ambassador. The nuncio serves both as the ambassador of the Holy See to the Republic of Mali and as the point-of-contact between the Catholic hierarchy in Mali and the pope.

Since 2008, the post of Nuncio to Mali has been held by the archbishop who is Nuncio to Guinea; the Nuncio to Mali resides in Conakry, Guinea.

In 1948, the Holy See established the Delegation to Dakar led by Marcel-François Lefebvre to represent its interests in French colonial Africa. Following the decolonization of the region, the title of that position was changed to Apostolic Delegate to Western Africa on 23 September 1960 and given responsibility for Senegal, Upper Volta, Cote d'Ivoire, Dahomey (Benin), Guinea, Mauritania, Niger, Sudan, Togo, Ghana, Gambia, and Sierra Leone. Over the next decade, as the Vatican established relationships with individual countries, country-specific offices were created, including the Delegations to Guinea, Togo, Mali, and Mauritania on 21 May 1973.

== List of papal representatives to Mali ==
Apostolic Delegates

- Giovanni Mariani (17 October 1973 – 11 January 1975)
- Luigi Barbarito (5 April 1975 – 10 June 1978)
- Luigi Dossena (24 October 1978 – 30 December 1985)

Apostolic Pro-Nuncios

- Pablo Puente Buces (12 May 1986 – 31 July 1989)
- Antonio Maria Vegliò (21 October 1989 - 2 October 1997)

Apostolic Nuncios

- Jean-Paul Gobel (6 December 1997 – 31 October 2001)
- Giuseppe Pinto (5 February 2002 – 6 December 2007)
- Martin Krebs (8 September 2008 – 8 May 2013)
- Santo Rocco Gangemi (5 February 2014 – 25 May 2018)
- Tymon Tytus Chmielecki (26 March 2019 – 2 February 2022)
- Jean-Sylvain Emien Mambé (2 February 2022 – present)
