= Apostolic Nunciature to Niger =

Diplomatic post of the Holy See

The Apostolic Nunciature to Niger is an ecclesiastical office of the Catholic Church in Niger. It is a diplomatic post of the Holy See, whose representative is called the Apostolic Nuncio with the rank of an ambassador.

The title Apostolic Nuncio to Niger is held by the prelate appointed Apostolic Nuncio to Burkina Faso; he resides in Burkina Faso. The current Apostolic Nuncio to Niger is Eric Soviguidi.

== List of papal representatives ==
Apostolic Pro-Nuncios

- Giovanni Mariani (20 September 1971 - 11 January 1975)
- Luigi Barbarito (5 April 1975 - 10 June 1978)
- Luigi Dossena (24 October 1978 - 25 August 1979)
- Justo Mullor García (25 August 1979 - 3 May 1985)
- Antonio Mattiazzo (16 November 1985 - 5 July 1989)
- Janusz Bolonek (18 November 1989 - 23 January 1995)

Apostolic Nuncios

- Luigi Ventura (25 March 1995 - 25 March 1999)
- Mario Zenari (12 July 1999 - 10 May 2004)
- Mario Roberto Cassari (8 September 2004 - 12 June 2007)
- Vito Rallo (12 June 2007 - 15 January 2015)
- Piergiorgio Bertoldi (24 April 2015 - 19 March 2019)
- Michael Francis Crotty (25 April 2020 – 16 July 2024)
- Eric Soviguidi (12 September 2025 – present)
