= Tymon Tytus Chmielecki =

Polish prelate of the Catholic Church and Holy See diplomat

His Excellency, The Most Reverend Tymon Tytus Chmielecki
- Apostolic Nuncio; Titular Archbishop of Tres Tabernae
- Appointed: 26 March 2019
- Term ended: 12 November 2022
- Predecessor: Santo Gangemi
- Successor: Jean-Sylvain Emien Mambé
- Other post: Titular Archbishop of Tres Tabernae
- Previous post: Apostolic Nuncio of Mali and Guinea (2019-2022)

Orders
- Ordination: 26 May 1991 by Pope John Paul II
- Consecration: 13 May 2019 by Pietro Parolin, Paul Gallagher, and Andrzej Suski

Personal details
- Born: November 29, 1965 (age 60) Toruń, Poland
- Motto: ΈΣΧΑΤΟΣ ΚΑΙ ΔΙΆΚΟΝΟΣ

Styles of Tymon Tytus Chmielecki
- Reference style: His Excellency; The Most Reverend
- Spoken style: Your Excellency
- Religious style: Archbishop

Tymon Tytus Chmielecki Burgaud (born 29 November 1965) is a Polish prelate of the Catholic Church and a diplomat in the service of the Holy See.

== Biography ==
Tymon Tytus Chmielecki was born on 29 November 1965 in Toruń, Poland. He was ordained a priest on 26 May 1991 by Pope John Paul II. He joined the diplomatic service of the Holy See on 1 July 1995 and was deployed to Georgia, Senegal, Austria, Ukraine, Kazakhstan, and Brazil. He also worked from 2015 to 2019 in Rome in the Section for Relations with States of the Secretariat of State.

On 26 March 2019, Pope Francis appointed him titular archbishop of Tres Tabernae and apostolic nuncio to Guinea and to Mali. He received his episcopal consecration on 13 May 2019 from Cardinal Pietro Parolin.

== Writings ==
- Author: Gruziński katolicyzm w XIX i na początku XX wieku w świetle archiwów watykańskich [Georgian Catholicism in the nineteenth and early twentieth century in the light of the Vatican archives] (in Polish). UMK Publishing. 1998.
- Editor: La protezione internazionale dei Beni Culturali e la Chiesa Cattolica (Studi e Ricerche della Pontificia Commissione di Archeologia Sacra) (in Italian). Pontifical Commission for Sacred Architecture. 1996.

== See also ==
- List of heads of the diplomatic missions of the Holy See
