= Roberto Campisi =

Italian prelate of the Catholic Church

Monsignor Roberto Campisi
- Permanent Observer to UNESCO
- Appointed: 27 September 2025
- Predecessor: Eric Soviguidi
- Previous post: Assessor for General Affairs of the Secretariat of State (2022-2025)

Orders
- Ordination: 7 December 2002

Personal details
- Born: 18 November 1978 (age 47) Siracusa, Sicily, Italy

Roberto Campisi (born 18 November 1978) is an Italian prelate of the Catholic Church who works in the diplomatic service of the Holy See.

== Biography ==
Roberto Campisi was born on 18 November 1978 in Siracusa, Sicily, Italy. He was ordained a priest for the Archdiocese of Siracusa on 7 December 2002.

In 2007 he obtained a doctorate in utroque iure from the Pontifical Lateran University.

== Diplomatic career ==
He entered the diplomatic service of the Holy See on 1 July 2010 and served in the Ivory Coast, Venezuela, and Italy, and then in the Section for General Affairs of the Secretariat of State as Counsellor of Nunciature. On 26 October 2022, he was appointed Assessor for General Affairs of the Secretariat of State by Pope Francis.

On 26 February 2025 he was appointed president of the newly instituted Commission of Donations for the Holy See.

On 27 September 2025, Pope Leo XIV appointed him Permanent Observer of Holy See to UNESCO.

== See also ==
- List of heads of the diplomatic missions of the Holy See

Catholic Church titles
Preceded by Luigi Roberto Cona	Assessor for General Affairs of the Secretariat of State; 26 October 2022 – 27 September 2025	Succeeded by Anthony Onyemuche Ekpo
New title	President of Commission of Donations for the Holy See; 26 February 2025 – 27 September 2025	Succeeded by office abolished
Diplomatic posts
Preceded by Eric Soviguidi	Permanent Observer of the Holy See to UNESCO; 27 September 2025 – present	Incumbent
