= Apostolic Nunciature to Senegal =

Diplomatic mission of the Holy See in West Africa

The Apostolic Nunciature to Senegal is the diplomatic mission of the Holy See to Senegal. The Apostolic Nuncio to Senegal is an ecclesiastical office of the Catholic Church in Senegal, with the rank of an ambassador. The nuncio serves both as the ambassador of the Holy See to the Republic of Senegal and as the point-of-contact between the Catholic hierarchy in Senegal and the pope.

On 9 July 1959, Jean-Marie Maury was named Apostolic Delegate to Dakar. This jurisdiction was established in 1948 and was first assigned to Marcel Lefebvre to represent the Holy See in French West Africa. The title of that position changed to Apostolic Delegate to Western Africa on 23 September 1960 with responsibility for Senegal, Upper Volta, Cote d'Ivoire, Dahomey, Guinea, Mauritania, Niger, Sudan, Togo, Ghana, Gambia, and Sierra Leone. He continued to hold that delegate's title when given his new position for Senegal on 28 December 1961.

The Apostolic Nuncio to Senegal is usually also the Apostolic Nuncio to Cabo Verde, Guinea-Bissau and Mauritania upon his appointment to said nations.

== List of papal representatives to Senegal ==
Apostolic Internuncios

- Jean-Marie Maury (28 December 1961 – 11 June 1965)

Apostolic Pro-Nuncios

- Giovanni Benelli (11 June 1966 – 29 June 1967)
- Giovanni Mariani (16 October 1967 – 11 January 1975)
- Luigi Barbarito (5 April 1975 – 10 June 1978)
- Luigi Dossena (24 October 1978 – 30 December 1985)
- Pablo Puente Buces (15 March 1986 – 31 July 1989)
- Antonio Maria Vegliò (21 October 1989 - 2 October 1997)

Apostolic Nuncios

- Jean-Paul Gobel (6 December 1997 – 31 October 2001)
- Giuseppe Pinto (4 December 2001 – 6 December 2007)
- Luis Mariano Montemayor (19 June 2008 – 22 June 2015)
- Michael Banach (19 March 2016 – 3 May 2022)
- Waldemar Stanisław Sommertag (6 September 2022 – 14 November 2026)
