= Luis Mariano Montemayor =

Argentinian prelate

His Excellency, The Most Reverend Luis Mariano Montemayor
- Apostolic Nuncio Emeritus of Ireland; Titular Archbishop of Illici
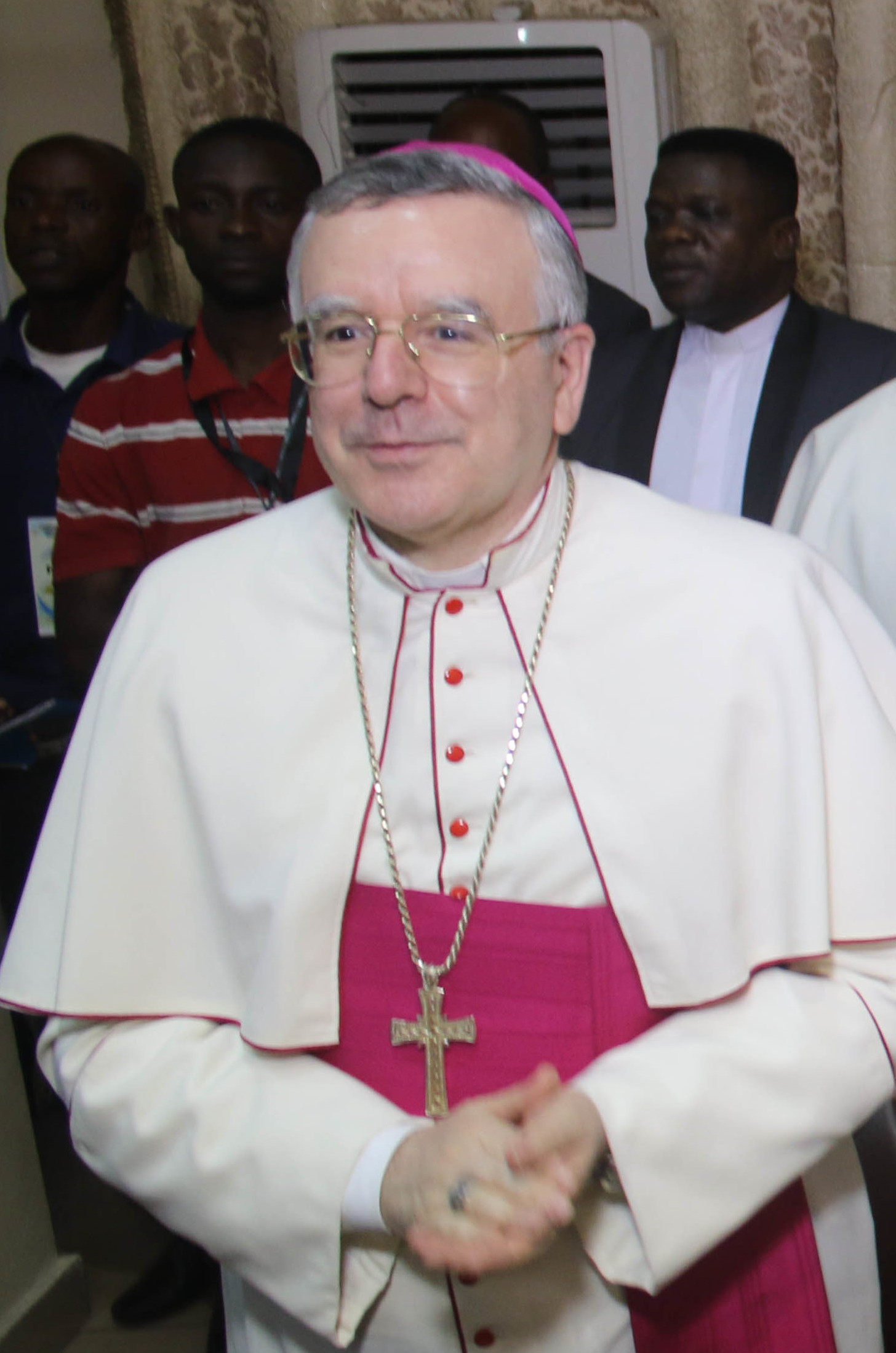
- Luis Mariano Montemayor
- Appointed: 25 February 2023
- Retired: 11 July 2026
- Predecessor: Thaddeus Okolo
- Other post: Titular Archbishop of Illici
- Previous posts: Apostolic Nuncio to Colombia (2018-2023); Apostolic Nuncio to the Democratic Republic of the Congo (2015-2018); Apostolic Nuncio to Senegal, Mauritania, Guinea-Bissau and Cabo Verde (2008-2015)

Orders
- Ordination: 15 November 1985 by Juan Carlos Aramburu
- Consecration: 6 August 2008 by Dominique Mamberti, Jorge Bergoglio, and Eduardo Maria Taussig

Personal details
- Born: March 16, 1956 (age 70) Buenos Aires, Argentina
- Motto: Sufficit Tibi Gratia Mea
- Coat of arms

Styles of Luis Mariano Montemayor
- Reference style: The Most Reverend
- Spoken style: Your Excellency
- Religious style: Monsignor
- Posthumous style: not applicable

Luis Mariano Montemayor (born 16 March 1956) is an Argentinian prelate of the Catholic Church who has worked in the diplomatic service of the Holy See since 1991. He began to serve in his present position as Apostolic Nuncio to Ireland in February 2023.

Prior to this, he served as the Apostolic Nuncio to Colombia from September 2018 to February 2023, Apostolic Nuncio to the Democratic Republic of the Congo from 2015 to 2018 and to Senegal, Cape Verde, and Guinea Bissau, as well as Apostolic Delegate to Mauritania from 2008 to 2015.

He was the second Argentinian to be named a nuncio, after Leonardo Sandri.

== Biography ==
Born in Buenos Aires on 16 March 1956, Montemayor was ordained a priest on 15 November 1985.

== Diplomatic career ==
After earning a degree in canon law, he entered the diplomatic service of the Holy See on 1 July 1991 and worked in Ethiopia, Brazil, and Thailand.

On 19 June 2008, he was appointed the titular archbishop of Illici and Apostolic Nuncio to Senegal and Cabo Verde, as well as Apostolic Delegate to Mauritania. On 17 September of that year he was also appointed Apostolic Nuncio to Guinea-Bissau.

He received his episcopal consecration on 6 August 2008 in Buenos Aires from Archbishop Dominique Mamberti.

On 22 June 2015, Pope Francis named him Apostolic Nuncio to the Democratic Republic of the Congo.

Early in 2018, Archbishop Montemayor, returned to Rome after being declared persona non grata for his criticisms of DRC President Joseph Kabila.

On 27 September 2018, Pope Francis named him Apostolic Nuncio to Colombia.

On 25 February 2023, he was named Apostolic Nuncio to Ireland. He presented his Letters of Credence to President Higgins on 11 May 2023.

He stated in 2024 that the Church in Ireland would undergo a reorganisation, "In due time, and following careful assessment and consultation, the present Dioceses of Tuam and Killala on the one hand, and Elphin and Achonry on the other, may be governed by one Bishop in each case, just as the Dioceses of Galway and Clonfert are today governed by one Bishop. If this process evolves still further, the associated Dioceses may then merge fully under their Bishop, and, in this way, the six Dioceses in the Province of Tuam will eventually become three".

On 11 July 2026, Pope Leo XIV accepted his resignation.

== See also ==
- List of heads of the diplomatic missions of the Holy See

Diplomatic posts
Preceded by Giuseppe Pinto	Apostolic Nuncio to Senegal; 2008–2015	Succeeded by Michael Banach
Preceded by Giuseppe Pinto	Apostolic Nuncio to Cabo Verde; 2008–2015	Succeeded by Michael Banach
Preceded by Giuseppe Pinto	Apostolic Nuncio to Guinea-Bissau; 2008–2015	Succeeded by Michael Banach
Preceded by Giuseppe Pinto	Apostolic Delegate to Mauritania; 2008–2015	Succeeded by Michael Banach
Preceded by Adolfo Tito Yllana	Apostolic Nuncio to DR Congo; 2015–2018	Succeeded by Ettore Balestrero
Preceded by Ettore Balestrero	Apostolic Nuncio to Colombia; 2018–2023	Succeeded by Paolo Rudelli
Preceded by Thaddeus Okolo	Apostolic Nuncio to Ireland; 2023–2026	Succeeded by Jan Romeo Pawłowski
