= Antonio Maria Vegliò =

Italian Catholic Cardinal

His Eminence Antonio Maria Vegliò
- President Emeritus of the Pontifical Council for Pastoral Care of Migrants and Itinerant People
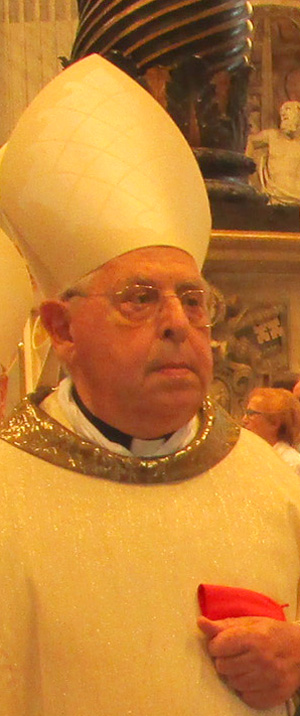
- Cardinal Vegliò during the Chair of Saint Peter on 11 October 2014.
- Church: Roman Catholic Church
- Appointed: 28 February 2009
- Term ended: 31 December 2016
- Predecessor: Renato Raffaele Martino
- Other post: Cardinal priest of San Cesareo in Palatio (2012-)
- Previous posts: Apostolic Pro-Nuncio to Papua New Guinea (1985–1989); Apostolic Pro-Nuncio to Solomon Islands (1985–1989); Apostolic Pro-Nuncio to Sénégal (1989–1997); Apostolic Pro-Nuncio to Guinea-Bissau (1989–1997); Apostolic Pro-Nuncio to Cape Verde (1989–1997); Apostolic Pro-Nuncio to Mali (1989–1997); Apostolic Nuncio to Lebanon (1997–2001); Apostolic Nuncio to Kuwait (1997–1999); Secretary of the Congregation for the Oriental Churches (2001–2009)

Orders
- Ordination: 18 March 1962 by Luigi Carlo Borromeo
- Consecration: 6 October 1985 by Agostino Casaroli
- Created cardinal: 18 February 2012 by Pope Benedict XVI
- Rank: Cardinal deacon (2012–22); Cardinal priest (2022–present)

Personal details
- Born: Antonio Maria Vegliò; 3 February 1938 (age 88) Macerata Feltria, Kingdom of Italy
- Denomination: Roman Catholic
- Coat of arms

Styles of Antonio Veglio
- Reference style: His Eminence
- Spoken style: Your Eminence
- Religious style: Monsignor
- Informal style: Cardinal

Antonio Maria Vegliò (born 3 February 1938) is an Italian Cardinal of the Roman Catholic Church, who has served as Vatican diplomat and in the Roman Curia. He was President of the Pontifical Council for the Pastoral Care of Migrants and Itinerants. Vegliò was created a Cardinal by Pope Benedict XVI on 18 February 2012.

== Early life and ordination ==
Born in Macerata Feltria, Italy, Vegliò was ordained a priest for the diocese of Pesaro in 1962. He attended the Pontifical Ecclesiastical Academy where he studied diplomacy. Besides his native Italian, he speaks English, French and Spanish.

== Nuncio ==
He was appointed Titular Archbishop of Eclano and was appointed Apostolic Pro-Nuncio to Papua New Guinea and the Solomon Islands on 27 July 1985.

In 1989, Vegliò was appointed Apostolic Pro-Nuncio to Senegal, Guinea-Bissau, and Cape Verde, and Apostolic Delegate to Mauritania on 21 October and on 25 November Pro-Nuncio to Mali. He was promoted to full Apostolic Nuncio to four of those countries—all but Mauritania—in December 1994.

On 2 October 1997, Pope John Paul II named him Apostolic Nuncio to Lebanon and Kuwait a well as Apostolic Delegate to the Arabian Peninsula.

== Curial work ==
On 11 April 2001, Vegliò was named Secretary of the Vatican Congregation for the Oriental Churches. On 28 February 2009, he was named President of the Pontifical Council for the Pastoral Care of Migrants and Itinerants.

Pope Benedict XVI announced on 6 January 2012 that Vegliò would be created cardinal. On 18 February he became Cardinal-Deacon of San Cesareo in Palatio. On 21 April 2012 Vegliò was named a member of the Congregation for Divine Worship and the Discipline of the Sacraments and the Pontifical Council for the Family and the Pontifical Council for the Laity.

In 2009, he organised the first European meeting of the pastoral care of people on the streets, such as drug users, street women, children, and the homeless. He has intervened several times in the public debate in support of the rights of migrants, refugees, immigrants, displaced persons, or other persons disadvantaged because of their status in mobility. He speaks out against piracy which he says infests the seas, and launched a campaign of solidarity with seafarers and their families affected by the tsunami in Japan.

He was one of the cardinal electors who participated in the 2013 papal conclave that elected Pope Francis.

Pope Francis appointed Vegliò to the Pontifical Commission for Vatican City State on 1 June 2013.

On 4 March 2022, he was elevated to the rank of cardinal priest.

== Views ==
=== Rights of migrants ===
In August 2009, he lamented the deaths of more than 70 Eritreans trying to reach Italy in a boat and implicitly criticized the Berlusconi government's tough new policies on immigration.

=== Swiss ban on minarets ===
Vegliò declared that the popular vote held in Switzerland against the construction of additional minarets was a heavy blow for religious freedom and integration in that country. His colleague Agostino Marchetto expressed a somewhat different view, arguing that the Swiss vote did not compromise religious freedom.

Diplomatic posts
Preceded by Francesco De Nittis	Apostolic Pro-Nuncio to the Solomon Islands; 27 July 1985 – 21 October 1989	Succeeded by Giovanni Ceirano
Preceded by Francesco De Nittis	Apostolic Pro-Nuncio to Papua New Guinea; 27 July 1985 – 21 October 1989	Succeeded by Giovanni Ceirano
Preceded by Pablo Puente Buces	Apostolic Nuncio to Cape Verde; 21 October 1989 – 2 October 1997	Succeeded by Jean-Paul Aimé Gobel
Preceded by Pablo Puente Buces	Apostolic Nuncio to Guinea-Bissau; 21 October 1989 – 2 October 1997	Succeeded by Jean-Paul Aimé Gobel
Preceded by Pablo Puente Buces	Apostolic Nuncio to Mali; 21 October 1989 – 2 October 1997	Succeeded by Jean-Paul Aimé Gobel
Preceded by Pablo Puente Buces	Apostolic Nuncio to Senegal; 21 October 1989 – 2 October 1997	Succeeded by Jean-Paul Aimé Gobel
Preceded by Pablo Puente Buces	Apostolic Delegate to Mauritania; 21 October 1989 – 2 October 1997	Succeeded by Jean-Paul Aimé Gobel
Preceded by Pablo Puente Buces	Apostolic Nuncio to Kuwait; 2 October 1997 – 13 December 1999	Succeeded by Giuseppe De Andrea
Preceded by Pablo Puente Buces	Apostolic Delegate to the Arabian Peninsula; 2 October 1997 – 13 December 1999	Succeeded by Giuseppe De Andrea
Preceded by Pablo Puente Buces	Apostolic Nuncio to Lebanon; 2 October 1997 – 11 April 2001	Succeeded by Luigi Gatti
Catholic Church titles
Preceded by Antonio Innocenti	Titular Archbishop of Eclano; 27 July 1985 – 18 February 2012	Succeeded by Nicolas Henry Marie Denis Thévenin
Preceded by Miroslav Stefan Marusyn	Secretary of Congregation for the Oriental Churches; 11 April 2001 – 28 February 2009	Succeeded by Cyril Vasil
Preceded by Renato Martino	President of the Pontifical Council for the Pastoral Care of Migrants and Itinerants; 28 February 2009 – 31 December 2016	Office abolished
Preceded by Andrzej Maria Deskur	Cardinal-Deacon San Cesareo in Palatio; 18 February 2012 –	Incumbent
