= Maurizio Bravi =

Italian priest of the Catholic Church

His Excellency, The Most Reverend Maurizio Claudio Bravi
- Apostolic Nuncio to Papua New Guinea and the Solomon Islands; Titular Archbishop of Tolentino
- Appointed: 15 January 2025
- Predecessor: Mauro Lalli
- Other post: Titular Archbishop of Tolentino
- Previous post: Permanent Observer to United Nations WTO (2016-2025)

Orders
- Ordination: 21 June 1986
- Consecration: 22 February 2025 by Pietro Parolin, Oscar Cantoni, Edgar Peña Parra and Francesco Beschi

Personal details
- Born: July 20, 1962 (age 63) Capriate San Gervasio, Bergamo, Italy
- Motto: Non Alta Sapientes

Styles of Maurizio Claudio Bravi
- Reference style: His Excellency; The Most Reverend
- Spoken style: Your Excellency
- Religious style: Archbishop

Maurizio Claudio Bravi (born 20 July 1962) is an Italian priest of the Catholic Church who has worked in the diplomatic service of the Holy See since 1995 and has served as the Permanent Observer of the Holy See to the World Tourism Organization (UNWTO) from 2016 to 2025. On 15 January 2025, he was appointed as apostolic nuncio to Papua New Guinea and the Solomon Islands.

== Biography ==
Maurizio Claudio Bravi was born on 20 July 1962 in Capriate San Gervasio, Bergamo, Italy. He studied at the local seminary and earned his bachelor's degree at the Theological Faculty of Northern Italy. He was ordained a priest of the Diocese of Bergamo on 21 June 1986, and spent the next five years at the parish of San Michele in Leffe.

== Diplomatic career ==
In 1991 he began his preparation for a diplomatic service of the Pontifical Ecclesiastical Academy. He also studied at the Pontifical Gregorian University, earning his licenciate in 1993 and his doctorate in 1995 with a dissertation on the Synod of Bishops. In 1995, he entered the service of diplomacy of the Holy See on 1 July 1995 and fulfilled assignments in the Dominican Republic (1995-1998) and Argentina (1998-2000); then in the offices of the Secretariat of State; and in France (2006-2011) and Canada (2011-2016).

On 27 February 2016, Pope Francis appointed him Permanent Observer of the Holy See to the World Tourism Organization in Madrid. (Note: This post was previously held by senior diplomats, archbishops serving as nuncio to Spain: Renzo Fratini (2009–2019) and Manuel Monteiro de Castro (2007–2008))

On 15 January 2025, he was appointed Nuncio to Papua New Guinea and the Solomon Islands. He was consecrated on 22 February 2025.

== See also ==
- List of heads of the diplomatic missions of the Holy See
