= Apostolic Nunciature to Mauritania =

Diplomatic mission of the Catholic Church

The Apostolic Nunciature to Mauritania is the diplomatic mission of the Holy See to Mauritania. The Apostolic Nuncio to Mauritania is an ecclesiastical office of the Catholic Church in Mauritania, with the rank of an ambassador. The nuncio serves both as the ambassador of the Holy See to the Republic of Mauritania and as the point-of-contact between the Catholic hierarchy in Mauritania and the pope.

Since its creation in 1973, the post of Nuncio to Mauritania has been held by the archbishop who is Nuncio to Senegal; the Nuncio to Mauritania resides in Dakar, Senegal.

In 1948, the Holy See established the Delegation to Dakar led by Marcel-François Lefebvre to represent its interests in French colonial Africa. Following the decolonization of the region, the title of that position was changed to Apostolic Delegate to Western Africa on 23 September 1960 and given responsibility for Senegal, Upper Volta, Côte d'Ivoire, Dahomey (Benin), Guinea, Mauritania, Niger, Sudan, Togo, Ghana, Gambia, and Sierra Leone. Over the next decade, as the Vatican established relationships with individual countries, country-specific offices were created, including the Delegations to Guinea, Togo, Mali, and Mauritania on 21 May 1973.

== List of papal representatives to Mauritania ==
Apostolic Delegate

- Giovanni Mariani (17 October 1973 – 11 January 1975)
- Luigi Barbarito (5 April 1975 – 10 June 1978)
- Luigi Dossena (24 October 1978 – 30 December 1985)
- Pablo Puente Buces (15 March 1986 – 31 July 1989)
- Antonio Maria Vegliò (21 October 1989 - 2 October 1997)
- Giuseppe Pinto (4 December 2001 – 6 December 2007)
- Luis Mariano Montemayor (19 June 2008 – 22 June 2015)
- Michael Banach (19 March 2016)

Apostolic Nuncios

- Michael Banach (13 May 2017 – 3 May 2022)
- Waldemar Stanisław Sommertag (6 September 2022 – 14 November 2026)
