= Giancarlo Dellagiovanna =

Italian Catholic archbishop (born 1961)

His Excellency, The Most Reverend Giancarlo Dellagiovanna
- Apostolic Nuncio to El Salvador
- Appointed: 25 April 2026
- Predecessor: Luigi Roberto Cona
- Other post: Titular Archbishop of Sistroniana
- Previous post: Apostolic Nuncio to Burkina Faso (2025)

Orders
- Ordination: 5 June 1999
- Consecration: 25 April 2025 by Pietro Parolin, Guido Marini, and Fortunatus Nwachukwu

Personal details
- Born: 18 September 1961 (age 64) Voghera, Pavia, Italy
- Motto: Bonum operanti pax (Latin for 'Peace for one who does good')

Styles of Giancarlo Dellagiovanna
- Reference style: His Excellency; The Most Reverend
- Spoken style: Your Excellency
- Religious style: Archbishop

Giancarlo Dellagiovanna (born 18 September 1961) is an Italian prelate of the Catholic Church who works in the diplomatic service of the Holy See.

== Biography ==
Giancarlo Dellagiovanna was born on 18 September 1961 in Voghera, Pavia, Italy. He was ordained a priest for the Roman Catholic Diocese of Tortona on 5 June 1999.

== Diplomatic career ==
He entered the Holy See diplomatic service on 1 July 2005, and has served in the apostolic nunciatures in Mexico, the Dominican Republic, Italy, the Netherlands, and the Section for General Affairs of Secretariat of State.

On 15 March 2025, Pope Francis appointed him Titular Archbishop of Sistroniana and Apostolic Nuncio to Burkina Faso. He was consecrated as an archbishop on 25 April 2025.

On 15 August 2025, Pope Leo XIV accepted his resignation.

On 25 April 2026, Pope Leo XIV named him as nuncio to El Salvador.

== See also ==
- List of heads of the diplomatic missions of the Holy See
