= Luigi Ventura =

Italian prelate of the Catholic Church (born 1944)

His Excellency, The Most Reverend Luigi Ventura
- Apostolic Nuncio emeritus of France; Titular Archbishop of Equilium
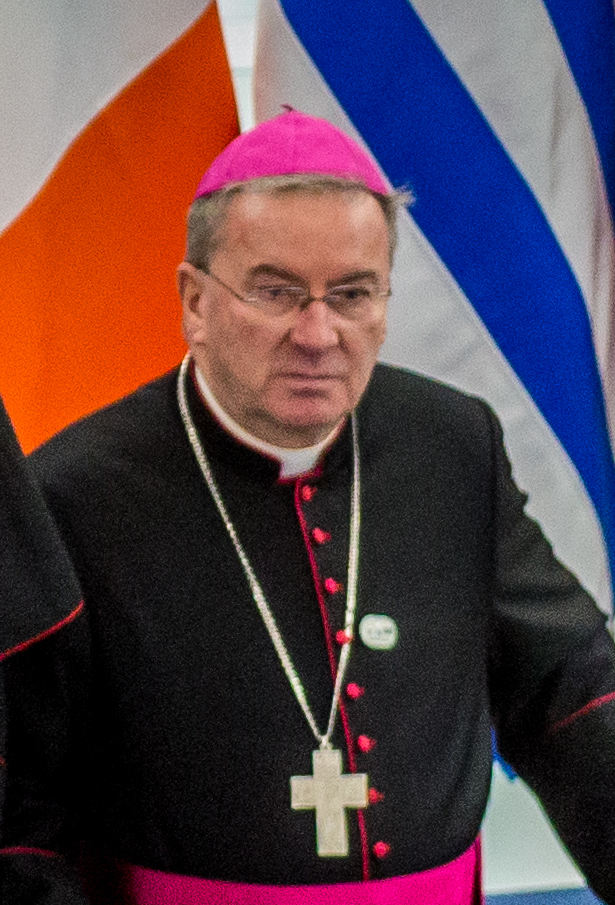
- Appointed: 22 September 2009
- Retired: 17 December 2019
- Predecessor: Fortunato Baldelli
- Successor: Celestino Migliore
- Other post: Titular Archbishop of Equilium
- Previous posts: Apostolic Nuncio to Canada (2001–2009); Apostolic Nuncio to Chile (1999–2001); Apostolic Nuncio to Burkina Faso, Cote d’Ivoire, and Niger (1995–1999)

Orders
- Ordination: 14 June 1969 by Luigi Morstabilini
- Consecration: 29 April 1995 by Angelo Sodano, Bruno Foresti and Giovanni Battista Re

Personal details
- Born: 9 December 1944 (age 81) Borgosatollo, Italy
- Denomination: Roman Catholic
- Motto: Unitatem Spiritus Servare
- Coat of arms

Styles of Luigi Ventura
- Reference style: The Most Reverend
- Spoken style: Your Excellency
- Religious style: Archbishop

Luigi Ventura (born 9 December 1944) is an Italian prelate of the Catholic Church who worked in the diplomatic service of the Holy See, ending his career as Apostolic Nuncio to France from 2009 to 2019. He became a nuncio and archbishop in 1995 and served in several African countries, Chile, and Canada before being posted to Paris.

Beginning in January 2019 he was under investigation by French authorities for sexual crimes. In July 2019, the Vatican lifted his diplomatic immunity to allow him to face criminal charges. He was allowed to relocate to Rome; Pope Francis accepted his resignation in December 2019. Ventura's criminal trial began in Paris on 10 November 2020 without him present, despite previous pledges that he would appear in-person. However, Ventura was also denied a motion to postpone the trial, which proceeded with many of his accusers testifying. A verdict was handed down on 16 December 2020, which resulted in Ventura receiving an eight-month suspended prison sentence which includes fines and probation. He has agreed to not appeal his sentence.

== Career ==
Ventura was born on 9 December 1944 in Borgosatollo, Italy. He was ordained a priest on 14 June 1969 for the Diocese of Brescia.

== Diplomatic career ==
To prepare for a diplomatic career he entered the Pontifical Ecclesiastical Academy in 1967.

He joined the diplomatic service of the Holy See in 1978. He earned a doctor of letters and holds a licentiate in canon law. His assignments from 1978 to 1984 were in Brazil, Bolivia and the United Kingdom. He then worked in Rome with the Section for Relations with States at the Secretariat of State until 1995.

On 25 March 1995, Pope John Paul II appointed him titular archbishop of Equilium and apostolic nuncio to the Côte d'Ivoire, Burkina Faso and Niger. He was consecrated a bishop on 29 April 1995 by Cardinal Angelo Sodano, Secretary of State. He was made nuncio to Chile on 25 March 1999.

On 22 June 2001, John Paul named him apostolic nuncio to Canada.

Pope Benedict XVI appointed him apostolic nuncio to France on 22 September 2009, replacing Fortunato Baldelli who had been appointed as Major Penitentiary of the Apostolic Penitentiary.

== Criminal allegations ==
In January 2019 the French authorities opened an investigation into Ventura after a junior official at Paris City Hall accused him of molestation. Ventura has not made comment on the allegations.

On 15 February 2019, Le Monde reported that a young male employed by the office of the mayor of Paris had filed a complaint for sexual assault against Ventura and that authorities had launched a formal inquiry in January. The city employee, Mathieu de La Souchère, and two other accusers using aliases, have asked French officials to ask the Vatican to waive Ventura's diplomatic immunity. French European Minister Nathalie Loiseau said she expects the Vatican to allow Ventura to be tried.

On 22 February a Canadian man, Christian Vachon, charged Ventura had touched him improperly in July 2008 when he was 32. Vachon said Ventura's successor as Nuncio to Canada, Archbishop Luigi Bonazzi, called him the day he registered his complaint to discuss it.

Ventura allowed himself to be questioned by French police in April. At his own request, Ventura met with his four accusers on 22–23 May and denied their charges. The accusers' attorneys were not allowed to ask him questions. On 8 July a Vatican spokesperson said the Holy See had informed French authorities a week earlier that it was waiving Ventura's diplomatic immunity. He called it "an extraordinary gesture". Le Monde reported it was the first withdrawal of diplomatic immunity on the part of the Vatican in modern history.

As of 30 September 2019, Ventura was living at a residence for retired priests in Rome, still subject to French investigators and prosecution.

At the time his France trial was announced in July 2020, Ventura was still under investigation for the alleged 2008 incident in Ottawa, Canada as well.

Pablo Larrain's film El Club also accused Ventura of covering up sexual violence in Chile when he served as apostolic nuncio to the country.

== Resignation ==
Pope Francis accepted his resignation on 17 December 2019, which Ventura had submitted as required on his 75th birthday. Such resignations are either accepted by Pope Francis quickly, as in Ventura's case, or sometimes he kept bishops in their jobs longer. The fact that Ventura resignation was announced on the same day as Francis' abuse reforms does not seem to be a coincidence. The resignation and its acceptance had been anticipated since Ventura had been relieved of his responsibilities and moved to Rome in September. Libération, which published some of the earliest complaints against Ventura, called the idea of retiring without referencing the criminal charges against Ventura "a beautiful example of Jesuitry".

== Criminal charges and trial ==
On 23 July 2020, the Paris Prosecutor's Office announced that Ventura had been criminally charged with sexually assaulting four men in 2018 and 2019 and will stand trial in Paris starting 10 November 2020. Ventura's lawyer stated that the former nuncio agreed to return to Paris and make in-person court appearances during his trial. Despite this pledge, Ventura did not appear in-person when his trial began in Paris on the scheduled date. Despite Ventura's absence, which was justified by a doctor's note pointing out the dangers of traveling to France due to the country's surging number of COVID-19 cases, a motion filed by Ventura's lawyers to postpone the trial was denied and several men accusing Ventura of groping them, including a Catholic seminarian, were able to testify in court as the trial progressed. Ventura's verdict was scheduled to be delivered on 16 December 2020, with prosecution seeking only a 10-month suspended prison sentence. His Paris trial concluded by 15 November. On the scheduled date of 16 December 2020, a Paris court convicted Ventura and handed an eight-month suspended prison sentence. The suspended sentence includes eight months probation and a payment €13,000 to the victims, as well as €9,000 in legal fees. On 18 January 2021, Ventura's lawyer said he would not appeal his conviction.

== See also ==
- Fortunato Baldelli
- Apostolic Nuncio
- Apostolic Nunciature to France
- List of heads of the diplomatic missions of the Holy See

Catholic Church titles
Preceded by Janusz Bolonek	Apostolic Nuncio to Burkina Faso, Ivory Coast, and Niger; 25 March 1995 – 25 March 1999	Succeeded by Mario Zenari
Preceded by Piero Biggio	Apostolic Nuncio to Chile; 25 March 1999 – 22 June 2001	Succeeded by Aldo Cavalli
Preceded by Paolo Romeo	Apostolic Nuncio to Canada; 22 June 2001 – 22 September 2009	Succeeded by Pedro Lopez Quintana
Preceded by Fortunato Baldelli	Apostolic Nuncio to France; 22 September 2009 – 17 December 2019	Succeeded by Celestino Migliore
