= Jean-Paul Gobel =

French prelate of the Catholic Church (born 1943)

His Excellency, The Most Reverend Jean-Paul Gobel
- Apostolic Nuncio emeritus of Egypt; Apostolic Delegate emeritus to the Arab League; Titular Archbishop of Calatia
- Appointed: 5 January 2013
- Retired: 3 January 2015
- Predecessor: Michael Louis Fitzgerald
- Successor: Bruno Musarò
- Other post: Titular Archbishop of Calatia
- Previous posts: Apostolic Nuncio to Iran (2007-2013); Apostolic Nuncio to Nicaragua (2001-2007); Apostolic Nuncio to Cape Verde, Guinea-Bissau, Mali, Senegal and Apostolic Delegate to Mauritania (1997-2001); Apostolic Nuncio to Armenia, Georgia and Azerbaijan (1993-1997)

Orders
- Ordination: 29 June 1969 by Jean-Baptiste-Étienne Sauvage
- Consecration: 6 January 1994 by John Paul II, Giovanni Battista Re, and Josip Uhač

Personal details
- Born: May 14, 1943 (age 83) Thonon-les-Bains, France

Styles of Jean-Paul Gobel
- Reference style: His Excellency; The Most Reverend
- Spoken style: Your Excellency
- Religious style: Archbishop

Jean-Paul Aimé Gobel (born 14 May 1943) is a French prelate of the Catholic Church who has worked in the diplomatic service of the Holy See.

== Biography ==
Gobel was born on 14 May 1943 and ordained a priest for the Diocese of Annecy on 29 June 1969.

== Diplomatic career ==
He completed the program of study at the Pontifical Ecclesiastical Academy in 1970 and then entered the diplomatic service of the Holy See. His early assignments were in Australia, Papua New Guinea, Mozambique, Nicaragua, and Burundi. Beginning in May 1989, Gobel was the first of several Holy See diplomats assigned to Hong Kong in order to study at close hand the Church in China and the longterm prospects for relations between China and the Holy See. (Note: Gobel was followed in Hong Kong by Fernando Filoni in 1992 and Eugene Nugent in 2001.) While based in Hong Kong, he visited Mongolia at the invitation of the government to study how to establish a Catholic missionary presence there, which resulted in the assignment of that work to the Congregation of the Immaculate Heart of Mary.

Pope John Paul II named him titular archbishop of Calatia and Apostolic Nuncio to Armenia and to Georgia on 7 December 1993. He received his episcopal consecration on 6 January 1994. On 15 January 1994, John Paul named him Nuncio to Azerbaijan as well. Between 1993 and 1996 he also headed the Apostolic Administration of the Caucasus. On 6 December 1997, John Paul named him Apostolic Nuncio to Senegal, Guinea-Bissau, Mali, and Cape Verde, and Apostolic Delegate to Mauritania.

On 31 October 2001, John Paul appointed him Apostolic Nuncio to Nicaragua, on 10 October 2007 to Iran, and on 5 January 2013 to Egypt as well as Delegate to the Arab League. He ended his service as nuncio when he was replaced by Bruno Musarò on 5 February 2015.

== See also ==
- List of heads of the diplomatic missions of the Holy See

== Sources ==
- "Le Français Jean-Paul Gobel, nouveau nonce en Iran". La Croix. 10 October 2007.

Catholic Church titles
New office	Head of Holy See Study Mission, Hong Kong; 1989–1992	Succeeded by Fernando Filoni
