= Apostolic Nunciature to Papua New Guinea =

Diplomatic Mission of the Holy See

The Apostolic Nunciature to Papua New Guinea is an ecclesiastical office of the Catholic Church in Papua New Guinea. It is a diplomatic post of the Holy See, whose representative is called the Apostolic Nuncio with the rank of an ambassador. The Apostolic Nuncio to Papua New Guinea is usually also the Apostolic Nuncio to the Solomon Islands upon his appointment to said nation. The nuncio resides in Port Moresby.

Australia administered the two areas known as Papua and New Guinea from the First World War until Papua New Guinea became an independent nation in 1975. The Holy See established its Delegation to Australia on 15 April 1914, which was succeeded by the Delegation to Australia, New Zealand and Oceania in 1947 and the Delegation to Australia and Papua New Guinea in 1968. Pope Paul VI named Gino Paro Delegate to Australia and Papua New Guinea–a single title–on 5 May 1969. The Nunciature to Australia was created 5 March 1973 and when Paro was named Nuncio to Australia on 4 July 1973 he remained Delegate to Papua New Guinea.

== List of papal representatives to Papua New Guinea ==
Apostolic Delegates

- Gino Paro (4 July 1973 – 5 April 1977)
  - The Nunciature to Papua New Guinea was created on 7 March 1977.

Apostolic Pro-Nuncios

- Andrea Cordero Lanza di Montezemolo (5 April 1977 – 25 October 1980)
- Francesco De Nittis (7 March 1981 – 24 January 1985)
- Antonio Maria Vegliò (27 July 1985 – 21 October 1989)
- Giovanni Ceirano (21 December 1989 – 20 August 1992)

Apostolic Nuncio

- Ramiro Moliner Inglés (2 January 1993 – 10 May 1997)
- Hans Schwemmer (9 July 1997 – 1 October 2001)
- Adolfo Tito Yllana (13 December 2001 – 31 March 2006)
- Francisco Montecillo Padilla (1 April 2006 – 10 November 2011)
- Santo Rocco Gangemi (24 March 2012 – 16 April 2013)
- Michael Banach (16 April 2013 – 19 March 2016)
- Kurian Mathew Vayalunkal (3 May 2016 – 1 January 2021)
- Fermín Emilio Sosa Rodríguez (31 March 2021 – 17 November 2023)
- Mauro Lalli (1 March 2024 – 15 January 2025)
- Maurizio Bravi (15 January 2025 – present)
