= Apostolic Nunciature to Guinea-Bissau =

Diplomatic post of the Holy See

The Apostolic Nunciature to Guinea-Bissau is an ecclesiastical office of the Catholic Church in Guinea-Bissau. It is a diplomatic post of the Holy See, whose representative is called the Apostolic Nuncio with the rank of an ambassador. The title Apostolic Nuncio to Guinea-Bissau is held by the prelate appointed Apostolic Nuncio to Senegal; he resides in Senegal.

== List of papal representatives to Guinea-Bissau ==
Apostolic Delegates

- Luigi Barbarito (5 April 1975 - 10 June 1978)
- Luigi Dossena (24 October 1978 - 30 December 1985)
- Pablo Puente Buces (15 March 1986 - 31 July 1989)

Apostolic Pro-Nuncio

- Antonio Maria Vegliò (21 October 1989 - 2 October 1997)

Apostolic Nuncios

- Jean-Paul Gobel (6 December 1997 - 31 October 2001)
- Giuseppe Pinto (5 March 2002 - 6 December 2007)
- Luis Mariano Montemayor (17 September 2008 – 22 June 2015)
- Michael Banach (22 August 2016 – 3 May 2022)
- Waldemar Stanisław Sommertag (6 September 2022 – 14 November 2026)
