= Schwemmer =

Schwemmer may refer to:

- Hans Schwemmer (1945–2001), Vatican diplomat and archbishop
- Heinrich Schwemmer (1621–1696), music teacher and composer
