= Apostolic Nunciature to the Solomon Islands =

Diplomatic mission of the Holy See in Oceania

The Apostolic Nunciature to the Solomon Islands is an ecclesiastical office of the Catholic Church in the Solomon Islands. It is a diplomatic post of the Holy See, whose representative is called the Apostolic Nuncio with the rank of an ambassador. The title Apostolic Nuncio to the Solomon Islands is held by the prelate appointed Apostolic Nuncio to Papua New Guinea; he resides in Papua New Guinea.

The United Kingdom took control of the Solomon Islands from Germany at the end of the 19th century and ruled the region under the British Solomon Islands Protectorate until the Solomon Islands became an independent nation in 1975. The Holy See was long represented in the region by representatives with regional responsibility. It established its Delegation to Australia on 15 April 1914, which was succeeded by the Delegation to Australia, New Zealand and Oceania in 1947 and the Delegation to Australia and Papua New Guinea in 1968. All those officials were responsibility for the Solomons as well. Pope Paul VI named Gino Paro Delegate to Australia and Papua New Guinea–a single title–on 5 May 1969. The separate Nunciature to Australia was created 5 March 1973 and when Paro was named Nuncio to Australia on 4 July 1973 he remained Delegate to Papua New Guinea and the Solomon Islands. The creation of the Nunciature to Papua New Guinea on 7 March 1977 left the Delegation with the Solomon Islands as its sole responsibility. The Holy See established the Apostolic Nunciature to the Solomon Islands on 27 July 1985.

== List of papal representatives to the Solomon Islands ==
Apostolic Delegates

- Gino Paro (5 May 1969 – 5 April 1977)
  - Originally named Apostolic Delegate to Australia and Papua New Guinea
  - The Nunciature to Australia was created on 5 March 1973.
  - The Nunciature to Papua New Guinea was created on 7 March 1977.
- Andrea Cordero Lanza di Montezemolo (5 April 1977 – 25 October 1980)
- Francesco De Nittis (7 March 1981 – 24 January 1985)

Apostolic Pro-Nuncios

- Antonio Maria Vegliò (27 July 1985 – 21 October 1989)
- Giovanni Ceirano (15 January 1990 – 20 August 1992)

Apostolic Nuncio

- Ramiro Moliner Inglés (2 January 1993 – 10 May 1997)
- Hans Schwemmer (9 July 1997 – 1 October 2001)
- Adolfo Tito Yllana (5 February 2002 – 31 March 2006)
- Francisco Montecillo Padilla (1 April 2006 – 10 November 2011)
- Santo Rocco Gangemi (27 January 2012 – 16 April 2013)
- Michael Banach (18 May 2013 – 19 March 2016)
- Kurian Mathew Vayalunkal (21 September 2016 – 1 January 2021)
- Fermín Emilio Sosa Rodríguez (16 December 2021 – 17 November 2023)
- Mauro Lalli (14 May 2024 – 15 January 2025)
- Maurizio Bravi (15 January 2025 – present)
