= Waldemar Stanisław Sommertag =

Polish prelate

His Excellency, The Most Reverend Waldemar Stanisław Sommertag
- Apostolic Nuncio to India; Titular Archbishop of Traiectum ad Mosam
- Church: Roman Catholic Church
- Appointed: 14 November 2026
- Predecessor: Leopoldo Girelli
- Other post: Titular Archbishop of Traiectum ad Mosam
- Previous posts: Apostolic Nuncio to Senegal, Cabo Verde, Guinea-Bissau and Mauritania (2022-2026); Apostolic Nuncio to Nicaragua (2018-2022)

Orders
- Ordination: 30 May 1993 by Jan Bernard Szlaga
- Consecration: 19 March 2018 by Pope Francis, Pietro Cardinal Parolin and Fernando Filoni

Personal details
- Born: 6 February 1968 (age 58) Więcbork, Poland
- Education: Pontifical Ecclesiastical Academy
- Motto: Secundum Cor Tuum ("According to Your Heart")
- Coat of arms: Waldemar Stanisław Sommertag's coat of arms

Styles of Waldemar Stanisław Sommertag
- Reference style: His Excellency; The Most Reverend
- Spoken style: Your Excellency
- Religious style: Archbishop

Waldemar Stanisław Sommertag (born 6 February 1968) is a Polish prelate of the Catholic Church who works in the diplomatic service of the Holy See. He was made an archbishop in 2018 and currently serves as nuncio to India.

== Biography ==
Sommertag was born on 6 February 1968 in Więcbork. On 30 May 1993, he was ordained a priest of the Diocese of Pelplin.

== Diplomatic career ==
To prepare for a diplomatic career he entered the Pontifical Ecclesiastical Academy in 1998.

He earned a degree in canon law and entered the diplomatic service of the Holy See on 19 June 2000. He worked in the nunciatures in Tanzania, Nicaragua, Bosnia and Herzegovina, Israel, Palestine and Cyprus, as well as in Rome in the Section for Relations with States of the Secretariat of State.

On 15 February 2018, Pope Francis appointed him titular archbishop of Traiectum ad Mosam and Apostolic Nuncio to Nicaragua. He received his episcopal consecration from Pope Francis on 19 March. On 18 February 2019, Sommertag announced that Pope Francis had ended the suspension from priestly duties imposed on Ernesto Cardenal in 1984 for refusing to leave political office as ordered by Pope John Paul II.

His tenure in Nicaragua was characterized by efforts to ease tension between the government and the political opposition, though the government came increasingly to view him, like the Catholic Church leadership in general, as an ally of its critics. For three years he quietly assisted in negotiations between the government and the families of its imprisoned critics, winning release for some, but he then began to use the term "political prisoners". On 18 November 2021, the Nicaraguan government decreed the abolition of the title "dean of the diplomatic corps", traditional accorded in Catholic countries to the representative of the Holy See. (Note: "Since the 2018 uprising, Catholic churches have been attacked, including the Managua cathedral in 2020. In 2019, Managua Auxiliary Bishop Silvio José Báez was essentially forced from his diocese ... after receiving several death threats. Last year [2021], the Ortegas called the bishops “coup perpetrators,” “offspring of the devil,” “foreign agents,” and also accused them of preaching a false Christianity. They have dispatched police to intimidate bishops and priests...")

On 6 March 2022, he left Nicaragua after the government withdrew its acceptance of his diplomatic status, requiring him to leave the country. The move came amid heightened conflict between the Church and the dictatorship of President Daniel Ortega.

On 6 September 2022, Pope Francis appointed him Apostolic Nuncio to Senegal, Cabo Verde, Guinea-Bissau and Mauritania.

On 14 November 2026, Pope Leo XIV appointed him as Apostolic Nuncio to India.

== See also ==
- List of heads of the diplomatic missions of the Holy See
