= Mauro Lalli =

Italian prelate

His Excellency, The Most Reverend Mauro Lalli
- Titular Archbishop of Pausula
- Appointed: 1 March 2024
- Term ended: 15 January 2025
- Predecessor: Fermín Emilio Sosa Rodríguez
- Other post: Titular Archbishop of Pausula
- Previous post: Apostolic Nuncio to Papua New Guinea and the Solomon Islands (2024-2025)

Orders
- Ordination: 14 July 1990
- Consecration: 11 May 2024 by Pietro Parolin, Bruno Forte, and Salvatore Pennacchio

Personal details
- Born: 17 September 1965 (age 60) Atessa, Italy
- Motto: Ecclesia florescit
- Coat of arms

Styles of Mauro Lalli
- Reference style: His Excellency; The Most Reverend
- Spoken style: Your Excellency
- Religious style: Archbishop

Mauro Lalli (born 17 September 1965) is an Italian prelate of the Catholic Church who works in the diplomatic service of the Holy See.

== Biography ==
Mauro Lalli was born in 1965 in Atessa, Italy. He was ordained a priest for the Roman Catholic Archdiocese of Chieti-Vasto on 14 July 1990.

== Diplomatic career ==
He entered the Diplomatic Service of the Holy See on 1 July 1999 and subsequently worked in the Papal Representations in Guatemala, the Democratic Republic of the Congo, Mozambique, Romania, Croatia, India, Iraq, Jordan and Cyprus.

On 1 March 2024, Pope Francis appointed him Titular Archbishop of Pausula and Apostolic Nuncio to Papua New Guinea. He was consecrated as an archbishop on 11 May 2024. He added the responsibilities of the Solomon Islands on 14 May 2024.

On 15 January 2025, he was replaced by Maurizio Bravi as nuncio to Papua New Guinea and the Solomon Islands.

== See also ==
- List of heads of the diplomatic missions of the Holy See
