= Michael Banach =

American prelate of the Catholic Church

His Excellency, The Most Reverend Michael Wallace Banach
- Apostolic Nuncio to Argentina
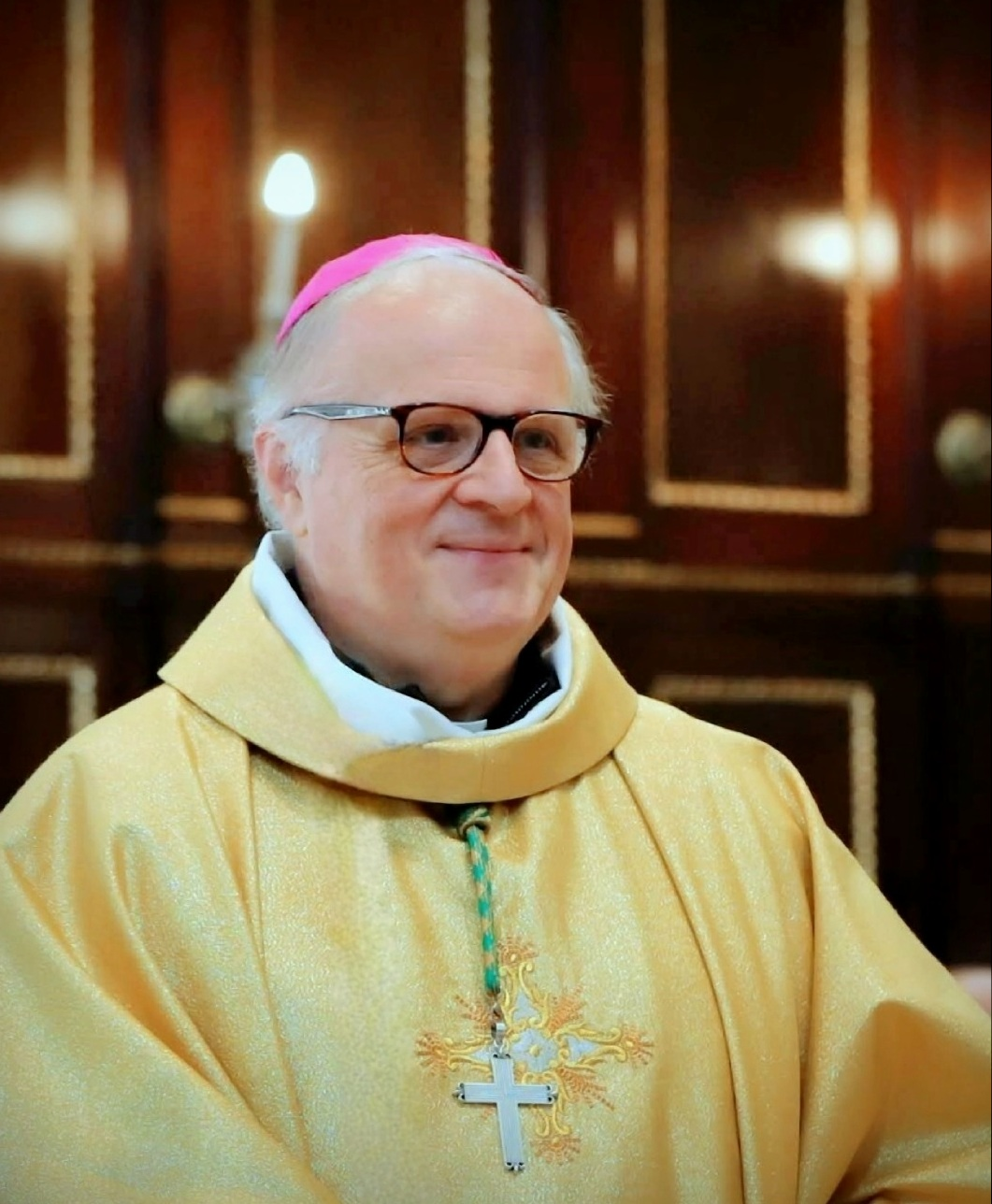
- Appointed: May 14, 2026
- Predecessor: Mirosław Adamczyk
- Other post: Titular Archbishop of Memphis
- Previous posts: Apostolic Nuncio to Hungary (2022-2026); Apostolic Nuncio to Senegal, Mauritania, Cabo Verde and Guinea-Bissau (2016-2022); Apostolic Nuncio to the Solomon Islands and Papua New Guinea (2013-2016)

Orders
- Ordination: July 2, 1988 by Timothy Joseph Harrington
- Consecration: April 27, 2013 by Tarcisio Cardinal Bertone

Personal details
- Born: November 19, 1962 (age 63) Worcester, Massachusetts, U.S.
- Denomination: Roman Catholic
- Motto: Humanitate Et Caritate (Humanity and charity)

Styles of Michael Wallace Banach
- Reference style: His Excellency; The Most Reverend
- Spoken style: Your Excellency
- Religious style: Archbishop

Michael Wallace Banach (born November 19, 1962) is an American prelate of the Roman Catholic Church who has worked in the diplomatic service of the Holy See since 1994. He has served as an observer at a United Nations agency and as apostolic nuncio to several nations in Asia, Africa and Europe.

== Biography ==
Michael Wallace Banach was born on November 19, 1962, in Worcester, Massachusetts. He was ordained on July 2, 1988, by Bishop Timothy Harrington as a priest for the Diocese of Worcester. In 1992, Banach completed his preparation for a diplomatic career for the Holy See at the Pontifical Ecclesiastical Academy in Rome.

== Diplomatic career ==
He joined the diplomatic service of the Holy See on July 1, 1994, and fulfilled assignments in the nunciatures in Bolivia and Nigeria as well as in Rome in the Section for Relations with States of the Secretariat of State.

On January 22, 2007 Banach was appointed permanent observer of the Holy See at the United Nations Office at Vienna and United Nations Industrial Development Organization and as permanent representative to the International Atomic Energy Agency and the Organization for Security and Co-operation in Europe in Vienna.

On February 22, 2013, Pope Benedict XVI named Banach titular archbishop of Memphis and gave him the title apostolic nuncio.

On April 16, 2013, Pope Francis appointed him as apostolic nuncio to Papua New Guinea. Banach received his episcopal consecration from Cardinal Secretary of State Tarcisio Bertone on April 27, 2013, in Rome. His co-consecrators were Cardinals Marc Ouellet and Fernando Filoni. On 18 May, 2013, he was given the additional responsibilities for the Solomon Islands;

On 19 March, 2016, Pope Francis appointed him apostolic nuncio to Senegal and apostolic delegate to Mauritania. On 9 July, 2016, he was assigned the additional responsibilities for Cabo Verde and on 22 August, 2016, to Guinea-Bissau. On May 13, 2017, his title in Mauritania changed from apostolic delegate to apostolic nuncio.

On May 3, 2022, he was appointed apostolic nuncio to Hungary.

On May 14, 2026, Pope Leo XIV appointed him apostolic nuncio to Argentina.

== See also ==
- List of heads of the diplomatic missions of the Holy See
