= Apostolic Nunciature to Burkina Faso =

Diplomatic post of the Holy See

Coordinates: 12.39807°N 1.51948°W

The Apostolic Nunciature to Burkina Faso is an ecclesiastical office of the Catholic Church in Burkina Faso. It is a diplomatic post of the Holy See, whose representative is called the Apostolic Nuncio with the rank of an ambassador. The Apostolic Nuncio to Burkina Faso is usually also the Apostolic Nuncio to Niger upon his appointment to said nation.

The nunciature's new building was inaugurated on 30 January 2015.

The Apostolic Nuncio to Burkina Faso is Giancarlo Dellagiovanna.

== List of papal representatives ==
Apostolic Delegates

- Luigi Dossena (24 October 1978 - 2 May 1979)

Apostolic Pro-Nuncio

- Justo Mullor García (2 May 1979 - 3 May 1985)
- Antonio Mattiazzo (16 November 1985 - 5 July 1989)
- Janusz Bolonek (18 November 1989 - 23 January 1995)

Apostolic Nuncio

- Luigi Ventura (25 March 1995 - 25 March 1999)
- Mario Zenari (12 July 1999 - 10 May 2004)
- Mario Roberto Cassari (31 July 2004 - 12 June 2007)
- Vito Rallo (12 June 2007 - 24 April 2015)
- Piergiorgio Bertoldi (24 April 2015 - 19 March 2019)
- Michael Francis Crotty (1 February 2020 – 16 July 2024)
- Giancarlo Dellagiovanna (15 March 2025 – 15 August 2025)
- Eric Soviguidi (15 August 2025 – present)

== See also ==
- List of diplomatic missions in Burkina Faso
