= Diocese of Vittoriana =

Roman Catholic titular see

The Diocese of Vittoriana (Latin: Dioecesis Victorianensis) is a suppressed and titular see of the Roman Catholic Church.

== History ==
Vittoriana, in today's Tunisia, is an ancient episcopal seat of the province of Byzacena.

The Bishopric was founded during the Roman Empire and survived through the Arian Vandal and Orthodox Byzantine empires, only ceasing to function with the Muslim conquest of the Maghreb. The diocese was re-founded in name at least in the 20th century and it remains today a titular see of the Roman Catholic church.

There are five documented bishops of this diocese.

- Saturnino took part in the council held in Carthage in 256 by St. Cyprian to discuss the question concerning the lapsii.
- Getulico participated in the Council of Cabarsussi, held in 393 by the Maximianists, a moderate sect of the Donatists, and signed the deed of the Council.
- Saturnine a donatist Bishop who attended the Carthage conference of 411, which brought together the Catholic and Donatist bishops of Roman Africa. on that occasion the town did not have a Catholic bishop.
- Rufiniano took part in the synod gathered in Carthage by the Vandal king Huneric in 484, after which he was exiled.
- Finally, Pompeianus was among the fathers of the second Council of Constantinople in 553.

Today Victorian survives as a titular bishop's seat; the current archbishop, personal title, holder is Ettore Balestrero.

- José Gabriel Calderón Contreras (1958 - 1962) appointed bishop of Cartago.
- Carlo Colombo (1964 - 1991)
- Cesare Nosiglia (1991 - 2003)
- Mauro Piacenza (2003 - 2010)
- Giuseppe Sciacca (2011 - 2012) appointed titular bishop of Fondi
- Ettore Balestrero, from 22 February 2013
