= Hans Schwemmer =

Hans Schwemmer (11 September 1945 – 1 October 2001) was a German prelate of the Catholic Church who worked in the diplomatic service of the Holy See.

== Biography ==
Hans Schwemmer was born in Riggau, a district in Pressath, Germany, on 11 September 1945. He attended Augustinus High School in Weiden and studied theology at the University of Regensburg.

He was ordained a priest of the Diocese of Regensburg on 4 July 1971 and worked as a chaplain in Sulzbach-Rosenberg and Cham.

To prepare for a diplomatic career he entered the Pontifical Ecclesiastical Academy in 1975. He also earned a doctorate in canon law while in Rome.

He joined the diplomatic service of the Holy See in 1979 and was given the title Monsignor on 3 June 1980. His early assignments included postings in the nunciatures in India, Belgium, and Argentina. Beginning in 1989 he worked in Rome in the offices of the Secretariat of State.

On 9 July 1997, Pope John Paul II appointed him titular archbishop of Rebellum and Apostolic Nuncio Papua New Guinea and to the Solomon Islands. He received his episcopal consecration on 21 September 1997 from Cardinal Angelo Sodano.

In Papua New Guinea, he confronted two priests who were holding public office, both provincial governors, in violation of canon law. He warned that if they ran for election again they would face harsher penalties than suspension of their priestly duties. One of them, Robert Lak, Governor of Western Highlands, said he had an understanding with his bishop and rejected Schwemmer's authority.

He died unexpectedly in a hospital in Cairns, Australia, on 1 October 2001. He was buried in Pressath on 13 October.

Archbishop-Schwemmer-Platz in Pressath is named for him.
