= Jacques Eugène Louis Ménager =

French prelate

- Archbishop of Reims
- Church: Catholic Church
- Archdiocese: Archdiocese of Reims
- In office: 13 July 1973 – 8 August 1988
- Predecessor: Émile André Jean-Marie Maury
- Successor: Jean Marie Balland
- Previous posts: Bishop of Meaux (1961-1973); Titular Bishop of Antiochia Parva (1955-1961); Auxiliary Bishop of Versailles (1955-1961)

Orders
- Ordination: 29 June 1936 by Benjamin-Octave Roland-Gosselin
- Consecration: 8 October 1955 by Alexandre Renard

Personal details
- Born: 24 July 1912 Anor, Nord, France
- Died: 13 March 1998 (aged 85)

Jacques Ménager (1912–1998), was a French Prelate the Roman Catholic church, 107th Archbishop of Reims and before that (1961–1973), Bishop of Meaux.

== Biography ==
Jacques Eugène Louis Ménager was born on 24 July 1912 in Anor (Nord). He was ordained a priest on 29 June 1936. On 23 June 1955 he was appointed Auxiliary Bishop of Bishop Renard, Bishop of Versailles. He received the titles of Titular Bishop of diocese of Antiochia Parva and was ordained bishop on 8 October 1955.

Two years after his appointment as Bishop of Meaux (7 December 1961), he was called to participate actively in the sessions of the Second Vatican Council. As a Father of the Council, he was a member of the Drafting Committee of Scheme XVII of the "Pastoral Constitution on the Church in the World of this Time" Gaudium et spes. (promulgation of 7 December 1965)

In the aftermath of the Council, in March 1967, the Permanent Council of the French Episcopate established the French Commission for Justice and Peace. Jacques Ménager was its first president until 1984.
