= Anthony Onyemuche Ekpo =

Italian prelate of the Catholic Church

Monsignor Anthony Ekpo
- Assessor for General Affairs of the Secretariat of State
- Appointed: 19 November 2025
- Predecessor: Roberto Campisi
- Previous post: Under Secretary of the Dicastery for Promoting Integral Human Development (2023-2025)

Orders
- Ordination: 30 July 2011

Personal details
- Born: 24 September 1981 (age 45) Umudike, Nigeria
- Education: Australian Catholic University (PhD), Pontifical Gregorian University (JCD)

Anthony Onyemuche Ekpo (born 24 September 1981) is the current assessor for General Affairs of the Secretariat of State since his appointment by Pope Leo XIV on 19 November 2025.

Ekpo was born in Umudike, Nigeria. He was ordained a priest on 30 July 2011 and incardinated in the Diocese of Umuahia. He graduated with a PhD in systematic theology from the Australian Catholic University in 2013.

As of 5 September 2016, he was an official at the Section for General Affairs of the Secretariat of State.

He obtained a doctorate in Canon Law from the Pontifical Gregorian University in 2021. Besides speaking Igbo and English, he also knows Italian and French.

He was appointed Chaplain to His Holiness on 17 March 2023. He was appointed undersecretary of the Dicastery for Promoting Integral Human Development on 18 April 2023.

In 2024 he published a book, The Roman Curia: History, Theology, and Organization.

He was appointed assessor for General Affairs on 19 November 2025 and will serve as deputy chief of staff. Ekpo is the first assessor not to come from the diplomatic service since the post's inception. In this role he replaces Roberto Campisi who was appointed permanent observer to UNESCO.

Catholic Church titles
Preceded by Alessandra Smerilli, F.M.A.	Under Secretary of the Dicastery for Promoting Integral Human Development; 18 April 2023 – 19 Nov 2025	Succeeded by Jozef Barlaš
Preceded by Roberto Campisi	Assessor for General Affairs of the Secretariat of State; 19 November 2025 – present	Succeeded by Incumbent
