= Eric Soviguidi =

Beninese Catholic prelate (born 1971)

His Excellency, The Most Reverend Eric Soviguidi
- Apostolic Nuncio to Burkina Faso and Niger; Titular Archbishop of Pumentum
- Appointed: 15 August 2025
- Predecessor: Giancarlo Dellagiovanna
- Other post: Titular Archbishop of Pumentum
- Previous post: Permanent Observer of the Holy See to UNESCO (2021-2025)

Orders
- Ordination: 10 October 1998
- Consecration: 15 November 2025 by Pietro Parolin, Fortunatus Nwachukwu and Roger Houngbédji

Personal details
- Born: 21 March 1971 (age 55) Abomey, Benin

Styles of Eric Soviguidi
- Reference style: His Excellency; The Most Reverend
- Spoken style: Your Excellency
- Religious style: Archbishop

Eric Soviguidi (born 21 March 1971) is a Beninese prelate of the Catholic Church who works in the diplomatic service of the Holy See.

== Biography ==
Eric Soviguidi was born on 21 March 1971 in Abomey, Benin. He was ordained a priest for the Archdiocese of Cotonou on 10 October 1998. He holds a Doctorate in Canon Law. He is reported to be fluent in several languages, including French, English, Spanish and Italian.

== Diplomatic career ==
He entered the diplomatic service of the Holy See on 1 July 2005, and has served at the apostolic nunciatures in Haiti, Ghana, Tanzania, Guatemala, and at the Section for Relations with States of the Secretariat of State. On 30 November 2021, Pope Francis appointed him Permanent Observer of the Holy See to UNESCO.

On 15 August 2025, Pope Leo XIV appointed him as Titular Archbishop of Pumentum and Apostolic Nuncio to Burkina Faso.

On 12 September 2025, he was given the additional responsibilities for Niger. He was consecrated bishop at Cotonou, Benin on 15 November 2025 by Cardinal Pietro Cardinal Parolin, Cardinal-Bishop of Santi Simone e Giuda Taddeo a Torre Angela assisted by Fortunatus Nwachukwu, Titular Archbishop of Aquaviva and Roger Houngbédji, Archbishop of Cotonou.

== See also ==
- List of heads of the diplomatic missions of the Holy See

Diplomatic posts
Preceded by Giancarlo Dellagiovanna	Apostolic Nuncio to Burkina Faso and Niger; 2025-present	Succeeded by incumbent
