= Roman Catholic Diocese of Maastricht =

Former Roman Catholic ecclesiastical territory in Belgium

The Roman Catholic Diocese of Maastricht (Latin Traiectum ad Mosam) was a Roman Catholic jurisdiction in parts of present Netherlands (including the see Maastricht) and Belgium, which has been nominally revived as a Latin titular bishopric.

== History ==
Established in 530 as Diocese of Maastricht on the territory of the suppressed Diocese of Tongeren and Maastricht (thus renamed to acknowledge Maastricht as its secondary see circa 380).

Suppressed in 720, its territory being used to establish the Roman Catholic Diocese of Liège, which also become a great prince-bishopric within the Holy Roman Empire.

== Ordinaries ==
Various terms of office are disputed, some bishops may be legendary

- Falco (c.498-c.512)
- Domitian of Huy (?-560)
- Saint Monulphus (549-588 or 558 – 597), probably moved the see to Maastricht
- Saint Gondulphus of Maastricht (589-614?)
- Saint Eberigisil (Ebregise) ? (614-627)
- Saint Bishop Perpete (? – ?)
- Saint John I Agnus (627–647)
- Saint Amand (647–650)
- Remaclus (650–662)
- Saint Theodard (662-669 or 669 – 670)
- Saint Lambert (669-705 or later), patron saint of the diocese
- Saint Hubert (705 or before - 727), patron saint of hunters and of the city

== Titular see ==
In 1971 the diocese was nominally restored as a Latin Titular see of Episcopal rank.

It has had the following incumbents :

- Petrus Joannes Antonius Moors (1970.12.29 – death 1980.09.16), emeritate as former Bishop of Roermond (Netherlands) (1959.01.26 – retired 1970.12.29)
- Joannes Baptist Matthijs Gijsen (1993.04.03 – 1996.05.24), as former Bishop of above Roermond (1972.01.20 – resigned 1993.01.23); however later Bishop of Reykjavík (Iceland) (1996.05.24 – retired 2007.10.30); died 2013
- Marcos Aurelio Pérez Caicedo (2006.06.10 – 2012.02.10) as Auxiliary Bishop of Guayaquil (Ecuador) (2006.06.10 – 2012.02.10); later Bishop of Babahoyo (Ecuador) (2012.02.10 – 2016.06.20), also Apostolic Administrator of Guaranda (Ecuador) (2014 – 2014.06.24), vice-president of Episcopal Conference of Ecuador (2014.05.08 – ...), later Metropolitan Archbishop of Cuenca (Ecuador) (2016.06.20 – ...)
- Waldemar Stanisław Sommertag (2018.02.18 - ), Apostolic Nuncio to Nicaragua.

== See also ==
Servatius of Tongeren
