= Mario Zenari =

Italian prelate of the Catholic Church (born 1946)

His Eminence Mario Zenari
- Cardinal; Apostolic Nuncio Emeritus to Syria
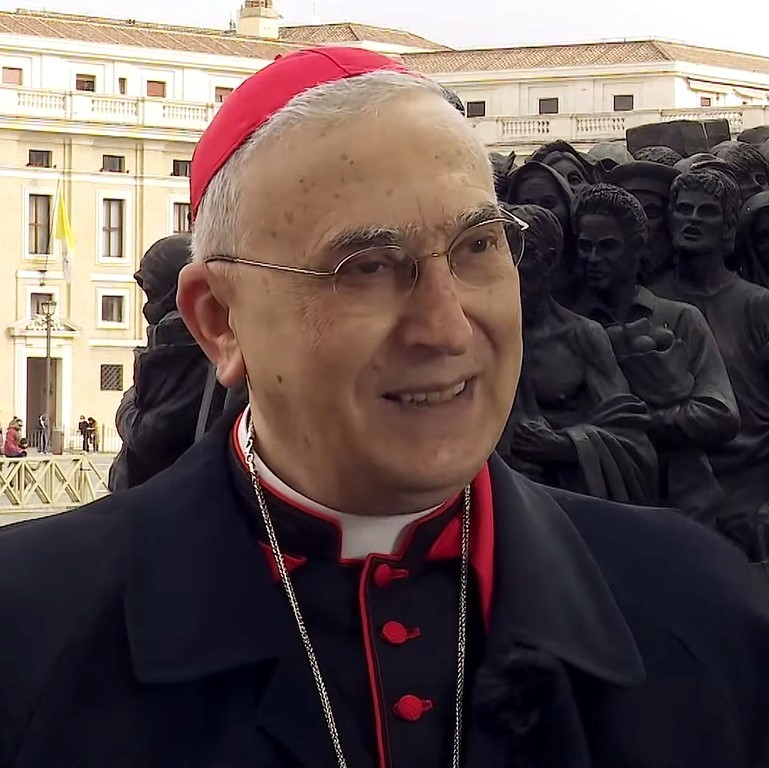
- Zenari in 2022.
- Church: Roman Catholic Church
- Appointed: 30 December 2008
- Retired: 2 February 2026
- Predecessor: Giovanni Battista Morandini
- Successor: Luigi Roberto Cona
- Other post: Cardinal-Deacon of Santa Maria delle Grazie alle Fornaci fuori Porta Cavalleggeri
- Previous posts: Apostolic Nuncio to Sri Lanka (2004–08); Apostolic Nuncio to Côte d'Ivoire, Niger and Burkina Faso (1999–2004); Permanent Observer to the Office of the U.N. and Specialized Institutions in Vienna, Permanent Observer to the U.N.Industrial Development Organization (1994–99), Permanent Representative to the International Atomic Energy Agency, and Permanent Representative to the Organization for Security and Cooperation in Europe (1994–99); Titular Archbishop of Iulium Carnicum (1999–2016)

Orders
- Ordination: 5 July 1970 by Giuseppe Carraro
- Consecration: 25 September 1999 by Angelo Sodano
- Created cardinal: 19 November 2016 by Pope Francis
- Rank: Cardinal Deacon

Personal details
- Born: Mario Zenari; 5 January 1946 (age 80) Rosegaferro, Verona, Italy
- Motto: Levate Oculos Vestros (Lift up your eyes)
- Coat of arms

Ordination history of Mario Zenari
History
Priestly ordination
- Date: 5 July 1970
Episcopal consecration
- Principal consecrator: Angelo Sodano
- Co-consecrators: Flavio Roberto Carraro, OFM Cap. Marcello Zago, OMI
- Date: 25 September 1999
Cardinalate
- Elevated by: Pope Francis
- Date: 19 November 2016

Styles of Mario Zenari
- Reference style: His Eminence
- Spoken style: Your Eminence
- Religious style: Cardinal
- Informal style: Cardinal

Mario Zenari (born 5 January 1946) is an Italian prelate of the Catholic Church who has been a cardinal since 2016. He has served his entire ecclesiastical career in the diplomatic service of the Holy See, holding senior positions beginning in 1999. He was nuncio to Sri Lanka from 2004 to 2008 and to Syria from 2008 to 2026.

== Life ==
Mario Zenari was born in 1946 in Rosegaferro. He was ordained a priest on 5 July 1970 in Verona from Bishop Giuseppe Carraro. To prepare for a diplomatic career he entered the Pontifical Ecclesiastical Academy in 1976.

== Diplomatic career ==
On 7 February 1994, Pope John Paul II appointed him to several diplomatic positions as papal representative to non-governmental organizations in Vienna. And on 15 June he was given the title monsignor as a Prelate of Honour of His Holiness.

He was named Titular Archbishop of Iulium Carnicum and apostolic nuncio to Burkina Faso, Niger, and Côte d'Ivoire on 12 July 1999. He received his episcopal consecration on 25 September 1999 from Cardinal Angelo Sodano.

On 10 May 2004, he was named the nuncio to Sri Lanka. On 30 December 2008, Pope Benedict XVI appointed him nuncio to Syria where he was stationed during the Syrian Civil War that began in 2011.

Pope Francis on 9 October 2016 announced that he would make Zenari a cardinal in the November consistory, citing his work for the "beloved and martyred Syria". He was made a Cardinal Deacon and assigned to the church of Santa Maria delle Grazie alle Fornaci fuori Porta Cavalleggeri. Francis made him a member of the Congregation for the Oriental Churches on 23 December 2017.

Zenari participated as a cardinal elector in the 2025 papal conclave that elected Pope Leo XIV. He later bestowed the pallium on Pope Leo at his inaugural Mass.

On 2 February 2026, Pope Leo XIV accepted his resignation as nuncio to Syria.

== See also ==
- Cardinals created by Francis
- List of heads of the diplomatic missions of the Holy See

Catholic Church titles
Preceded by Alfred Kipkoech Arap Rotich	Titular Archbishop of Iulium Carnicum; 1999–2016	Succeeded by Pedro Sergio de Jesús Mena Díaz
Preceded by Duraisamy Simon Lourdusamy	Cardinal Deacon of Santa Maria delle Grazie alle Fornaci fuori Porta Cavalleggeri; 2016–present	Incumbent
Diplomatic posts
Preceded by Luigi Ventura	Apostolic Nuncio to the Ivory Coast, Niger and Burkina Faso; 1999–2004	Succeeded by Mario Roberto Cassari
Preceded by Thomas Yeh Sheng-nan	Apostolic Nuncio to Sri Lanka; 2004–2008	Succeeded by Joseph Spiteri
Preceded by Giovanni Battista Morandini	Apostolic Nuncio to Syria; 2008–2026	Succeeded by vacant
