= Émile André Jean-Marie Maury =

French prelate

- Archbishop of Reims
- Church: Catholic Church
- Archdiocese: Archdiocese of Reims
- In office: 25 June 1968 – 16 December 1972
- Predecessor: François Marty
- Successor: Jacques Eugène Louis Ménager
- Previous posts: Apostolic Nuncio to the Democratic Republic of the Congo (1965-1968); Titular Archbishop of Laodicea in Phrygia (1959-1968); Apostolic Nuncio to Burundi and Rwanda (1965-1967); Apostolic Internuncio to Senegal (1961-1965); Apostolic Delegate to Western Africa (1960-1965); Apostolic Delegate to Dakar (1959-1960); Titular Bishop of Elis (1957-1959); Coadjutor Bishop of Tarbes-et-Lourdes (1957-1959)

Orders
- Ordination: 29 June 1932 by Jean Verdier
- Consecration: 3 February 1958 by Pierre-Marie Gerlier

Personal details
- Born: 22 May 1907 Agen, Lot-et-Garonne, France
- Died: 5 January 1994 (aged 86) Toulouse, Occitania, France

Émile André Jean-Marie Maury (22 May 1907 – 5 January 1994), sometimes called Jean-Marie Maury or Jean Baptiste Maury, was a French prelate of the Catholic Church who worked in the diplomatic service of the Holy See and was Archbishop of Reims from 1968 to 1972.

== Biography ==
Maury was born on 22 May 1907 in Agen and ordained a priest on 29 June 1932.

He was appointed coadjutor bishop of Tarbes and Lourdes and titular bishop of Elis on 20 December 1957. He was consecrated bishop on 3 February 1958 by Cardinal Pierre-Marie Gerlier.

On 9 July 1959, he was appointed Titular Archbishop of Laodicea in Phrygia and was named apostolic delegate to Dakar, a jurisdiction established in 1948 with responsibility for French West Africa. The position was rechristened Apostolic Delegate to Western African on 23 September 1960 and given responsibility for Senegal, Upper Volta, Cote d'Ivoire, Dahomey, Guinea, Mauritania, Niger, Sudan, Togo, Ghana, Gambia, and Sierra Leone. On 28 December 1961, he was additionally appointed Apostolic Internuncio to Senegal.

In 1965, he was transferred to serve as Apostolic Nuncio to the Democratic Republic of the Congo on 11 June, to Burundi on 16 June, and to Rwanda on 2 September.

In 1967, he renounced the last two nunciatures, continuing as Nuncio to the Congo until he left the diplomatic service the next year.

On 25 June 1968, he was appointed Archbishop of Reims. He retired on 16 December 1972 for health reasons.

He died on 5 January 1994.
