= Ettore Balestrero =

Italian prelate of the Catholic Church

His Excellency, The Most Reverend Ettore Balestrero
- Permanent Observer of the Holy See to the United Nations in Geneva
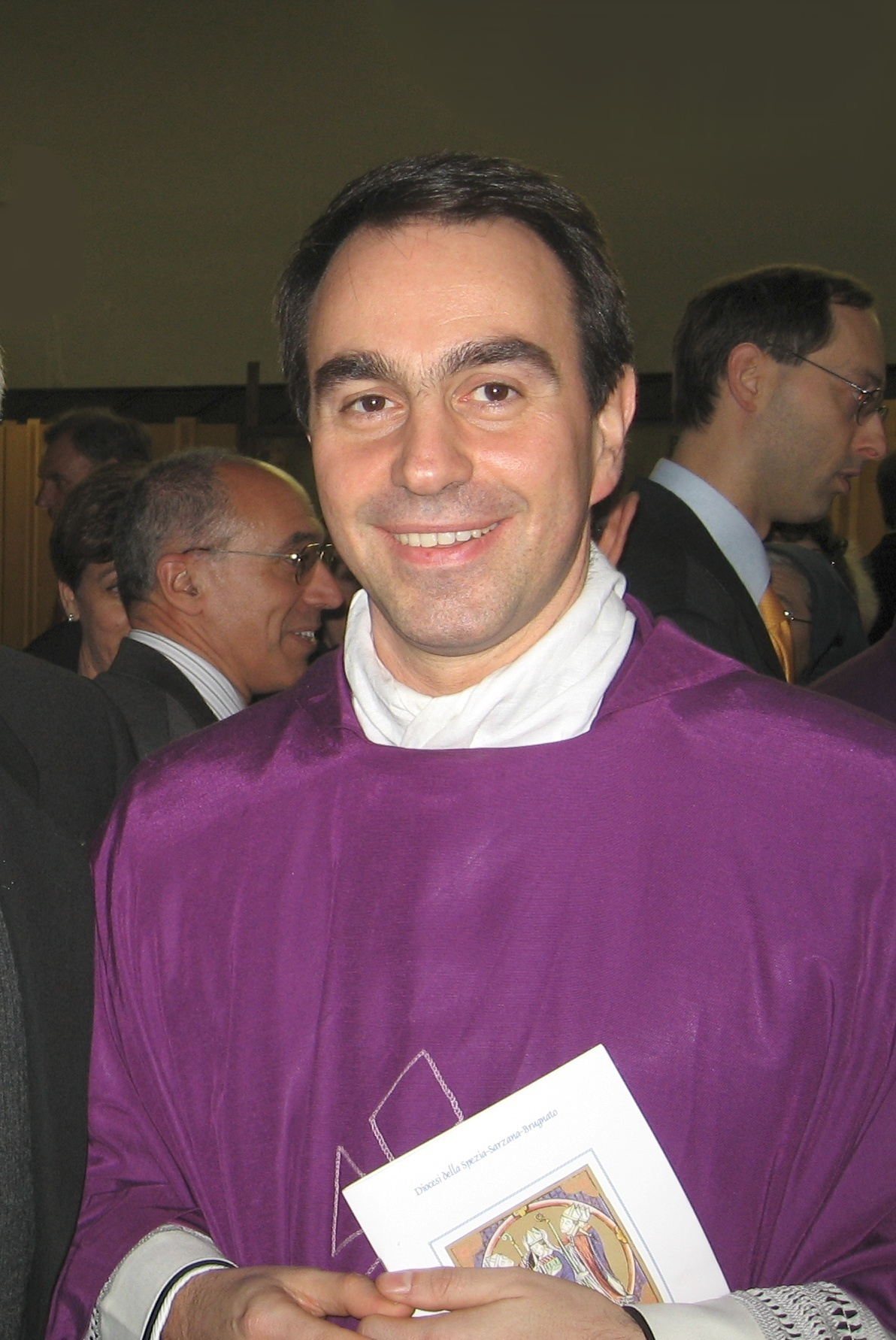
- Balestrero in 2008
- Church: Catholic Church
- Appointed: 21 June 2023
- Predecessor: Fortunatus Nwachukwu
- Other post: Titular Archbishop of Victoriana
- Previous posts: Apostolic Nuncio to the Democratic Republic of the Congo (2018-2023); Apostolic Nuncio to Colombia (2013-18); Undersecretary for Relations with States (2009-13)

Orders
- Ordination: 18 September 1993 by Camillo Ruini
- Consecration: 27 April 2013 by Tarcisio Bertone

Personal details
- Born: Ettore Balestrero; 21 December 1966 (age 59) Genoa, Italy
- Education: Almo Collegio Capranica; Pontifical Ecclesiastical Academy
- Coat of arms

Styles of Ettore Balestrero
- Reference style: His Excellency; The Most Reverend
- Spoken style: Your Excellency
- Religious style: Archbishop

Ettore Balestrero (21 December 1966) is an Italian prelate of the Catholic Church who works in the diplomatic service of the Holy See.

== Biography ==
Balestrero was born in Genoa on 21 December 1966; his mother was an American. After attending law school, he entered the Almo Collegio Capranica and was ordained a priest on 18 September 1993 for the Diocese of Rome by Cardinal Camillo Ruini. He earned a degree in theology and a doctorate in Canon Law. After serving in the Parish of Santa Maria Mater Ecclesiae al Torrino, he became a student at the Pontifical Ecclesiastical Academy.

== Diplomatic career ==
He entered the Holy See's diplomatic service in 1996 and held positions in Korea, Mongolia and the Netherlands. Beginning in 2001 he served in the Secretariat of State. On 17 August 2009, Pope Benedict XVI appointed him Undersecretary for Relations with States, replacing Pietro Parolin who was named Apostolic Nuncio to Venezuela the same day.

Balestrero speaks fluent English as well as French, Spanish, German and Dutch.

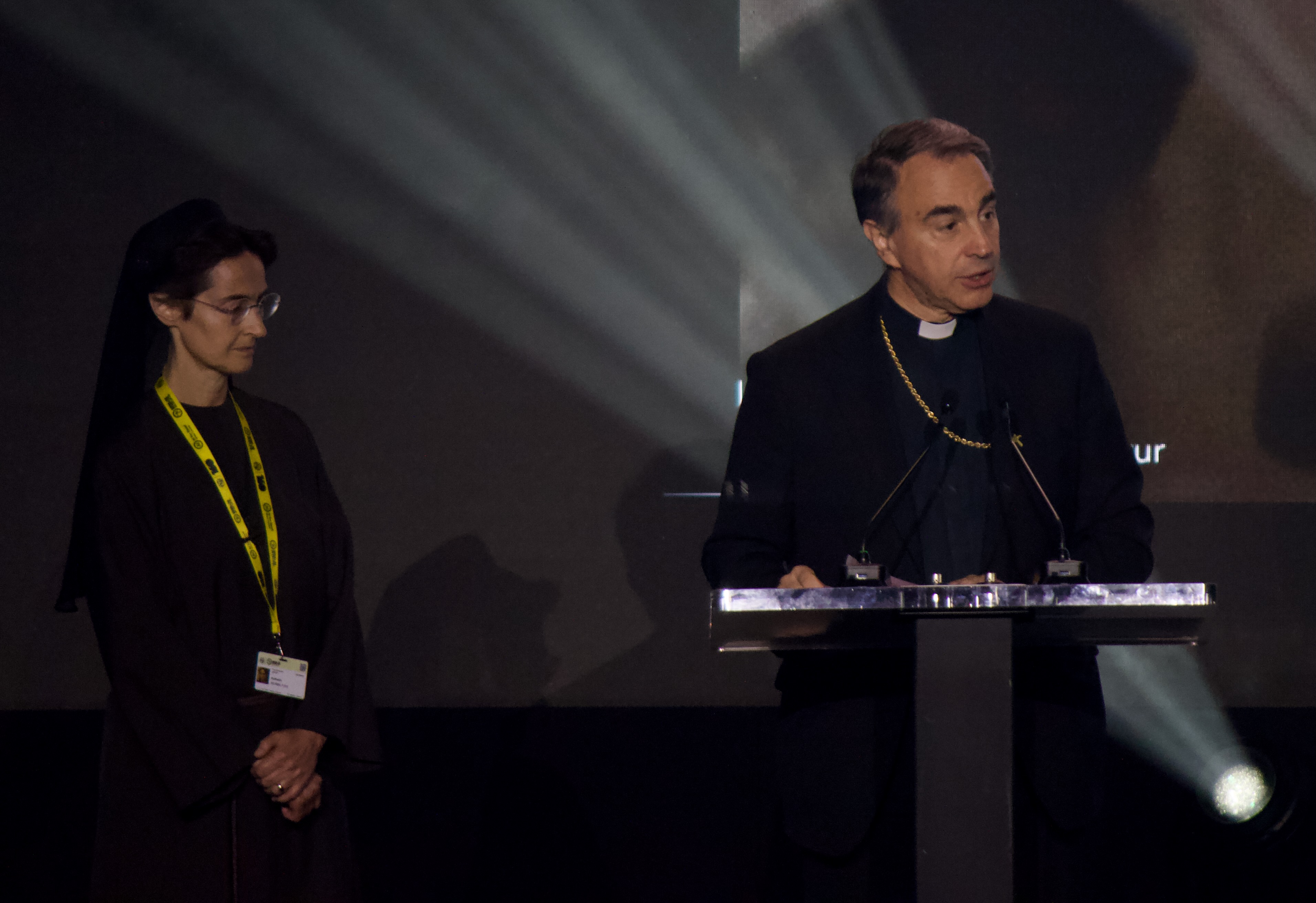
Balestrero speaks at AI for Good in 2025

As Undersecretary, Balestrero was the Vatican's representative to Moneyval, the arm of the Council of Europe charged with the prevention of money laundering and the financing of terrorism. Moneyval's July 2016 assessment showed the Vatican had substantially improved its compliance, though it identified ongoing problems as well. Balestrero accepted its judgments and said the report was "not an end, but a milestone in our continuing efforts ... an important passage in our continuing efforts to marry moral commitments to technical excellence.

On 22 February 2013, in the last week of the papacy of Pope Benedict XVI, Balestrero was appointed apostolic nuncio to Columbia and Titular Archbishop of Vittoriana. (Note: In February 2013, Balestrero was mentioned in connection with "Vatileaks". As Vatican representative to Moneyval, he had participated in heated internal debate about Vatican procedures for ensuring transparency in financial transactions, and that debate was thought to have prompted the unauthorized leak of confidential Vatican correspondence. Federico Lombardi, director of the Vatican press office, dismissed suggestions that Balestrero’s foreign assignment was related to a recent newspaper story, noting that the appointment of an apostolic nuncio requires the approval of the country to which the nuncio is posted and is not accomplished quickly.) He received his episcopal consecration from Cardinal Tarcisio Bertone on 27 April. In Colombia he supported the government's entente with the FARC guérilla movement and the peace agreement reached in November 2016, leading to a papal visit to Colombia in 2017.

Early in 2018, the Apostolic Nuncio to the Democratic Republic of the Congo (DRC), Archbishop Luis Mariano Montemayor, returned to Rome after being declared persona non grata for his criticisms of DRC President Joseph Kabila. On 6 July, the Holy See sent Balestrero to the nunciature in the DRC to resolve its affairs (per il disbrigo degli affari), though he was not given a title in the nunciature. (Note: La Croix described Balestrero as chargé d’affaires in the DRC. When the Holy See next announced an assignment for Balestrero in April 2019, it referred to him only as a titular archbishop and used no diplomatic title.)

On 27 April 2019, after elections and a change of government in the DRC, Pope Francis named Balestrero apostolic nuncio to the Democratic Republic of the Congo. (Note: Montemayor had succeeded Balestrero as Nuncio to Colombia on 27 September 2018.)

On 21 June 2023, Pope Francis appointed him as Permanent Observer of the Holy See to the United Nations in Geneva.

== See also ==
- List of heads of the diplomatic missions of the Holy See

Catholic Church titles
| Preceded by Pietro Parolin | Undersecretary for Relations with States; 17 August 2009 – 22 February 2013 | Succeeded by Antoine Camilleri |
Diplomatic posts
| Preceded by Aldo Cavalli | Apostolic Nuncio to Colombia; 22 February 2013 – 6 July 2018 | Succeeded by Luis Mariano Montemayor |
| Preceded by Luis Mariano Montemayor | Apostolic Nuncio to the Democratic Republic of Congo; 27 April 2019 – 21 June 2023 | Succeeded by Mitja Leskovar |
| Preceded by Fortunatus Nwachukwu | Permanent Observer of the Holy See to the United Nations in Geneva; 21 June 2023 – present | Incumbent |
