= Apostolic Nunciature to El Salvador =

Diplomatic post of the Holy See

The Apostolic Nunciature to El Salvador is an ecclesiastical office of the Catholic Church in El Salvador. It is a diplomatic post of the Holy See, whose representative is called the Apostolic Nuncio with the rank of an ambassador. The nuncio resides in San Salvador.

== List of papal representatives to El Salvador ==
Apostolic Delegates and Internuncios

- Giovanni Battista Marenco (15 September 1920 – 22 October 1921)
- Angelo Rotta (16 October 1922 (Note: The Internunciature to Central America then covered Costa Rica, El Salvador, Honduras, and Nicaragua.) – 9 May 1925)
- Giuseppe Fietta (27 February 1926 – 23 September 1930)
- Carlo Chiarlo (28 January 1932 – 30 September 1933)

Apostolic Nuncios

- Albert Levame (21 December 1933 - 12 November 1939)
- Giuseppe Beltrami (20 February 1940 - 15 November 1945)
- Giovanni Castellani (18 December 1945 - 23 August 1951)
- Gennaro Verolino (5 September 1951 - 25 February 1957)
- Giuseppe Paupini (25 February 1957 - 23 May 1959)
- Ambrogio Marchioni (1 July 1959 - 1 September 1964)
- Bruno Torpigliani (1 September 1964 - 3 August 1968)
- Girolamo Prigione (27 August 1968 - 2 October 1973)
- Emanuele Gerada (8 November 1973 - 15 October 1980)
- Lajos Kada (15 October 1980 - 8 April 1984)
- Francesco De Nittis (24 January 1985 - 25 June 1990)
- Manuel Monteiro de Castro (21 August 1990 - 2 February 1998)
- Giacinto Berloco (5 May 1998 - 24 February 2005)
- Luigi Pezzuto (2 April 2005 - 17 November 2012)
- Léon Kalenga Badikebele (22 February 2013 - 17 March 2018)
- Santo Rocco Gangemi (25 May 2018 – 12 September 2022)
- Luigi Roberto Cona (26 October 2022 – 19 March 2026)
- Giancarlo Dellagiovanna (25 April 2026 – present)
