= Apostolic Nunciature to Cabo Verde =

Diplomatic post of the Holy See

The Apostolic Nunciature to Cabo Verde is an ecclesiastical office of the Catholic Church in Cabo Verde. It is headed by the Apostolic Nuncio, a member of the diplomatic service of the Holy See, who represents the interests of the Holy See to Church officials, the government, and civil society in Cabo Verde. It is a diplomatic post with the rank of ambassador. The title Apostolic Delegate to Cabo Verde is held by the prelate appointed Apostolic Nuncio to Senegal; he resides in Dakar.

== Papal representatives to Cabo Verde ==
Apostolic Pro-Nuncios

- Luigi Dossena (24 October 1978 – 30 December 1985)
- Pablo Puente Buces (15 March 1986 – 31 July 1989)
- Antonio Maria Vegliò (21 October 1989 - 2 October 1997)

Apostolic Nuncios

- Jean-Paul Gobel (6 December 1997 – 31 October 2001)
- Giuseppe Pinto (5 February 2002 – 6 December 2007)
- Luis Mariano Montemayor (19 June 2008 – 22 June 2015)
- Michael Banach (9 July 2016 – 3 May 2022)
- Waldemar Stanisław Sommertag (6 September 2022 – 14 November 2026)
