= Apostolic Nunciature to the Democratic Republic of the Congo =

Diplomatic post of the Holy See

The Apostolic Nunciature to the Democratic Republic of the Congo is an ecclesiastical office of the Catholic Church in the Democratic Republic of the Congo. It is a diplomatic post of the Holy See, whose representative is called the Apostolic Nuncio with the rank of an ambassador. The nuncio resides in the Gombe, Kinshasa district of Kinshasa, the capital city.

The Holy See established its Delegation to the Belgian Congo on 10 January 1930. The Democratic Republic of the Congo gained its independence from Belgium in 1960 and the Holy See established its Nunciature to the Democratic Republic of the Congo on 16 February 1963.

== List of papal representatives to the Democratic Republic of the Congo ==
Apostolic Delegates to the Belgian Congo (Note: In 1962, Roberti was named "Delegate to Congo (Leopoldville)", a term used in this era to distinguish the former Belgian colony from the other new nation using the name Congo, "Congo (Brazzaville)".)

- Giovanni Battista Dellepiane (18 January 1930 - 12 January 1949)
- Pietro Sigismondi (16 December 1949 – 9 December 1954)
- Alfredo Bruniera (12 December 1954 – 25 April 1959)
- Gastone Mojaisky-Perrelli (8 August 1959 - 13 October 1962)
- Vito Roberti (13 October 1962 - 15 August 1965)

Apostolic Nuncios

- Émile André Jean-Marie Maury (11 June 1965 - 25 June 1968)
- Bruno Torpigliani (3 August 1968 - 6 June 1973)
- Lorenzo Antonetti (29 June 1973 - 15 June 1977)
- Edoardo Rovida (13 August 1977 - 7 March 1981)
- Josip Uhač (3 June 1981 - 3 August 1984)
- Alfio Rapisarda (29 January 1985 - 2 June 1992)
- Faustino Sainz Muñoz (7 October 1992 - 21 January 1999)
- Francisco-Javier Lozano Sebastián (20 March 1999 - 2001)
- Giovanni d'Aniello (15 December 2001 - 22 September 2010)
- Adolfo Tito Yllana (20 November 2010 - 17 February 2015)
- Luis Mariano Montemayor (22 June 2015 - 27 September 2018)
- Ettore Balestrero (27 April 2019 – 21 June 2023)
- Mitja Leskovar (16 April 2024 – present)
