= Santo Gangemi =

Italian prelate of the Catholic Church (born 1961)

His Excellency, The Most Reverend Santo Gangemi
- Apostolic Nuncio of Serbia; Titular Archbishop of Umbriatico
- Appointed: 12 September 2022
- Predecessor: Luciano Suriani
- Other post: Titular Archbishop of Umbriatico
- Previous posts: Apostolic Nuncio to El Salvador (2018-2022); Apostolic Nuncio to Mali (2014-2018); Apostolic Nuncio to Guinea (2013-2018); Apostolic Nuncio to the Solomon Islands and Papua New Guinea (2012-2013)

Orders
- Ordination: 28 June 1986 by Ignazio Cannavò
- Consecration: 17 March 2012 by Angelo Sodano, Calogero La Piana, and Giovanni Angelo Becciu

Personal details
- Born: 16 August 1961 (age 65) Messina, Italy
- Motto: VIDE UT SILEAS

Styles of Santo Gangemi
- Reference style: His Excellency; The Most Reverend
- Spoken style: Your Excellency
- Religious style: Archbishop

Santo Rocco Gangemi (born 16 August 1961) is an Italian prelate of the Catholic Church who has spent his career in the diplomatic service of the Holy See.

== Biography ==
Gangemi was born in Messina on 15 August 1961. He was ordained a priest on 28 June 1986 by Archbishop Ignazio Cannavò of Messina.

== Diplomatic career ==
On 27 January 2012, Pope Benedict XVI named him Titular Archbishop of Umbriatico and Apostolic Nuncio to the Solomon Islands. Cardinal Angelo Sodano consecrated him a bishop on 17 March.

His motto, Vide ut sileas ("See that you are quiet") comes from the book Isaiah Isaiah 7. On 24 March 2012, he was also appointed Apostolic Nuncio to Papua New Guinea. He was replaced in those positions on 16 April 2013.

On 6 November 2013, Pope Francis appointed him Apostolic Nuncio to Guinea. On 5 February 2014, he was appointed Apostolic Nuncio to Mali as well.

He was appointed apostolic nuncio to El Salvador on 25 May 2018.

On 12 September 2022 Pope Francis appointed him Apostolic Nuncio to Serbia.

== See also ==
- List of heads of the diplomatic missions of the Holy See
