= Gino Paro =

Italian prelate

Gino Paro (17 June 1910 – 21 September 1988) was an Italian prelate of the Catholic Church. He became a bishop and head of the Vatican's training program for diplomats in 1962. Raised to the rank of archbishop, he served as an apostolic nuncio from 1969 to 1978.

== Biography ==
Gino Paro was born on 17 June 1910 in Ponte di Piave, Treviso, Italy. He was ordained a priest on 5 July 1936 of the Diocese of Treviso. By 1945 he had a position at the Secretariat of State.

His dissertation, The right of papal legation, was published in 1948. At that period he was working in the diplomatic service of the Holy See, assigned to the nunciature in Dublin with the title of auditor.

On 31 August 1962, Pope John XXIII appointed him titular bishop of Diocaesarea in Isauria and President of the Pontifical Ecclesiastical Academy. Cardinal Jean-Marie Villot ordained him a bishop on 7 October.

On 5 May 1969, Pope Paul VI appointed him Titular Archbishop of Torcello and Apostolic Delegate to Australia and Papua New Guinea. His title for Australia changed to Apostolic Pro-Nuncio on 4 July 1973, and he was succeeded by Andrea Cordero Lanza di Montezemolo as the first Pro-Nuncio to Papua New Guinea on 5 April 1977. His diplomatic service ended on 10 June 1978 when he was replaced as Pro-Nuncio to Australia by Luigi Barbarito.

Paro participated in all four sessions of the Second Vatican Council.

He died on 21 September 1988.

There is a street in Ponte di Piave named "Via Monsignor Gino Paro".
