= Francesco De Nittis =

Italian prelate

- Apostolic Nuncio to Uruguay
- Church: Catholic Church
- In office: 25 June 1990 – August 1999
- Predecessor: Andrea Cordero Lanza di Montezemolo
- Successor: Janusz Bolonek
- Other post: Titular Archbishop of Tunes (1981-2014)
- Previous posts: Apostolic Nuncio to Honduras (1986-1990); Apostolic Nuncio to El Salvador (1985-1990); Apostolic Delegate to the Solomon Islands (1981-1985); Apostolic Pro-Nuncio to Papua New Guinea (1981-1985)

Orders
- Ordination: 15 July 1956
- Consecration: 2 May 1981 by Agostino Casaroli

Personal details
- Born: 3 July 1933 Vieste, Province of Foggia, Kingdom of Italy
- Died: 10 March 2014 (aged 80)

Francisco De Nittis (3 July 1933 – 10 March 2014) was an Italian prelate of the Catholic Church, an archbishop and a diplomat.

Born in Vieste, Italy, De Nittis was ordained a priest on 15 July 1956.

To prepare for a diplomatic career he entered the Pontifical Ecclesiastical Academy in 1959.

On 7 March 1981, he was named titular archbishop of Tunes, Apostolic Nuncio to Papua New Guinea and Apostolic Delegate to the Solomon Islands. He received his episcopal consecration on 2 May 1981 from Cardinal Agostino Casaroli.

De Nittis was appointed apostolic nuncio to El Salvador on 24 January 1985 and to Honduras on 10 April 1986. In October 1987, he hosted peace talks between Salvadoran President Jose Napoleon Duarte and anti-government rebels.

He was appointed apostolic nuncio to Uruguay on 25 June 1990.

He resigned in 1999.

He died on 10 March 2014.
