= Calatia =

Ancient town of Campania, Italy

Coordinates: 41.0439°N 14.3625°E

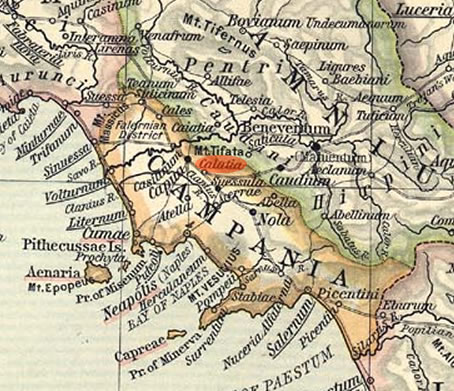
- Settlement Pattern in Calatia posizione
- Interactive map of Calatia
- Type: Settlement
- Location: Maddaloni, Province of Caserta, Italy
- Region: Campania

Site notes
- Management: Soprintendenza per i beni archeologici di Salerno, Avellino e Caserta
- Public access: Yes
- Website: Sito Archeologico di Calatia (in Italian)

Cālātia was an ancient town of Campania, southern Italy, c. 10 km southeast of Capua, on the Via Appia, near the point where the Via Popillia branches off from it. It is represented by a locality known as Villa Galazia and by the church of San Giacomo alle Galazze (or San Giacomo delle Galazze or San Giacomo Le Galazze), within the modern town of Maddaloni, very near the boundary with the neighboring town of San Nicola la Strada, and right on the Via Appia. The Via Appia here, as at Capua, abandons its former SE direction for a length of 2,000 Oscan feet (500 m), for which it runs due east and then resumes its course SE. Ruins include remains of the walls (with sector from the Samnite age, in tuff, and others from the Sulla period) and the pre-Roman necropolis was partially excavated in 1882. The ten shafts lined with slabs of tuff which may have been the approaches to tombs or may have served as wells.

The history of Calatia is similar to that of its more powerful neighbor Capua, but as it lay near the point where the Via Appia turns east and enters the mountains, it had some strategic importance. In 313 BC it was taken by the Samnites and recaptured by the dictator Fabius Maximus Rullianus; the Samnites captured it again in 311 BC, but it must have been retaken at an unknown date. In the 3rd century BC we find it issuing coins with an Oscan legend, but in 211 BC it shared the fate of Capua. In 174 BC it is mentioned that its walls were being repaired by the censors. In 59 BC a colony was established here by Caesar.
