= Macri (ancient city) =

Macri, or perhaps Macras, was a town and bishopric in the Roman province of Mauretania Sitifensis. It corresponds to the modern town of Magra, Algeria.

== History ==
This town figures only in the Notitia Africæ and the Itinerarium Antonini. It flourished for a long period, and Arabian authors often mention it in eulogistic terms. According to the 1910 Catholic Encyclopedia, it was situated on the Oued-Magra which still bears its name, near the Djebel Magra, in the plain of Bou Megueur, south-west of Sétif (in Algeria). The 2013 Annuario Pontificio places it at Henchir-Remada.

In 411 Macri had a Donatist bishop, Maximus, who attended the Carthage Conference of 411. In 479, the Vandal king Huneric banished a great many Catholics from this town and from many other regions of the desert. In 484 Emeritus, Bishop of Macri, was one of the members present at the Carthage Assembly; like the others, he was banished by Huneric.
