= Fermín Emilio Sosa Rodríguez =

Mexican priest of the Catholic Church (born 1968)

His Excellency, The Most Reverend Fermín Emilio Sosa Rodríguez
- Apostolic Nuncio of Bolivia; Titular Archbishop of Virunum
- Appointed: 17 November 2023
- Predecessor: Angelo Accattino
- Other post: Titular Archbishop of Virunum
- Previous post: Apostolic Nuncio to Papua New Guinea and the Solomon Islands (2021-2023)

Orders
- Ordination: 12 July 1998 by Darío Castrillón Hoyos
- Consecration: 19 June 2021 by Pietro Parolin, Gustavo Rodriguez Vega, and Emilio Carlos Berlie Belaunzarán

Personal details
- Born: April 12, 1968 (age 58) Izamal, Yucatán, Mexico
- Motto: OMNIA POSSUM IN EO QUI ME CONFORTAT
- Coat of arms

Styles of Fermín Emilio Sosa Rodríguez
- Reference style: His Excellency; The Most Reverend
- Spoken style: Your Excellency
- Religious style: Archbishop

Fermín Emilio Sosa Rodríguez (born 12 April 1968) is a Mexican archbishop of the Catholic Church who works in the diplomatic service of the Holy See.

== Biography ==
Fermín Emilio Sosa Rodríguez was born in Izamal, Mexico, on 12 April 1968 to José Alfonso Sosa López and Norma Rodríguez Sánchez. He entered the seminary of the Archdiocese of Yucatán in Mérida in 1991 and was ordained a deacon on 29 April 1998. He was ordained a priest of the archdiocese of Yucatán on 12 July 1998 by Cardinal Darío Castrillón Hoyos in the cathedral of Guadalupe. In October of that year, he entered the Pontifical Ecclesiastical Academy to prepare for a career in the diplomatic service. He earned a doctorate in canon law at the Pontifical Gregorian University on 20 November 2002.

== Diplomatic career ==
He entered the diplomatic service of the Holy See on 1 January 2003. His assignments included postings in the papal representations in Papua New Guinea, Côte d'Ivoire, Burkina Faso, the United States of America, Canada, and Serbia.

On 31 March 2021, Pope Francis appointed him titular archbishop of Virunum and apostolic nuncio to Papua New Guinea. His consecration as bishop took place in Izamal on 19 June with Cardinal Pietro Parolin as consecrator.

On 16 December 2021, he was given additional responsibility as Apostolic Nuncio to the Solomon Islands.

On 17 November 2023, Pope Francis appointed him as Apostolic Nuncio to Bolivia.

== See also ==
- List of heads of the diplomatic missions of the Holy See
