= Luigi Dossena =

Italian prelate

- Apostolic Nuncio to Slovakia
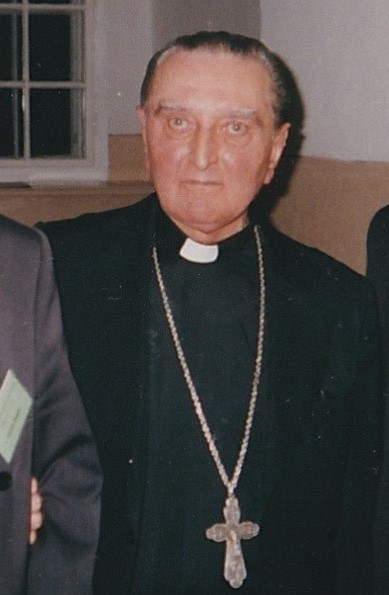
- Church: Catholic Church
- In office: 30 December 1985 – 2 March 1994
- Predecessor: Mario Tagliaferri
- Successor: Fortunato Baldelli
- Other post: Titular Archbishop of Carpi (1973-2007)
- Previous posts: Apostolic Nuncio to Peru (1985-1994); Apostolic Pro-Nuncio to Mali (1980-1985); Apostolic Delegate to Mauritania & Guinea-Bissau (1978-1985); Apostolic Pro-Nuncio to Senegal & Cabo Verde (1978-1985); Apostolic Delegate to Mali (1978-1980); Apostolic Pro-Nuncio to Burkina Faso & Niger (1978-1979); Apostolic Pro-Nuncio to Korea (1973-1978)

Orders
- Ordination: 25 March 1951
- Consecration: 25 March 1973 by Jean-Marie Villot

Personal details
- Born: 28 May 1925 Campagnola Cremasca, Province of Cremona, Kingdom of Italy
- Died: 9 September 2007 (aged 82)

Luigi Dossena (28 May 1925 – 9 September 2007) was an Italian prelate of the Catholic Church who spent his career in the diplomatic service of the Holy See.

== Biography ==
Luigi Dossena was born in Campagnola Cremasca, Italy, on 28 May 1925. He was ordained a priest of the Diocese of Crema on 25 March 1951.

To prepare for a diplomatic career, he entered the Pontifical Ecclesiastical Academy in 1953. His early assignments in the diplomatic service include a stint in the Dominican Republic.

On 27 February 1973, Pope Paul VI appointed him a titular archbishop and Apostolic Pro-Nuncio to Korea. He received his episcopal consecration on 25 March 1973 from Cardinal Jean-Marie Villot.

On 24 October 1978, Pope John Paul II named him Apostolic Pro-Nuncio to Cape Verde, Niger, Senegal, and Upper Volta and also Apostolic Delegate to Mali, Guinea-Bissau, and Mauritania. His responsibilities changed as the Vatican reorganized its diplomatic presence in Africa. The posts of Pro-Nuncio to Upper Volta and to Niger were assigned to Justo Mullor García on 2 May and 25 August 1979. And Dossena's title in Mali was raised to Apostolic Pro-Nuncio on 3 June 1980.

On 30 December 1985, he was appointed Apostolic Nuncio to Peru by Pope John Paul. Though viewed as more moderate than his predecessor Mario Tagliaferri, his took similar positions with respect to his role as nuncio and the Church's role in civic life. Some in the Church hierarchy in Peru complained he had excessive influence over episcopal appointments. He urged the Peruvian bishops to publicly support Mario Vargas Llosa in the 1990 presidential election.

On 2 March 1994, he was named Apostolic Nuncio to Slovakia.

His service as nuncio ended when he was replaced in Slovakia by Henryk Józef Nowacki on 8 February 2001.

He died on 9 September 2007.
