= Giuseppe Pinto =

Italian prelate of the Catholic Church (born 1952)

His Excellency, The Most Reverend Giuseppe Pinto
- Apostolic Nuncio Emeritus to Croatia, Titular Archbishop of Anglona
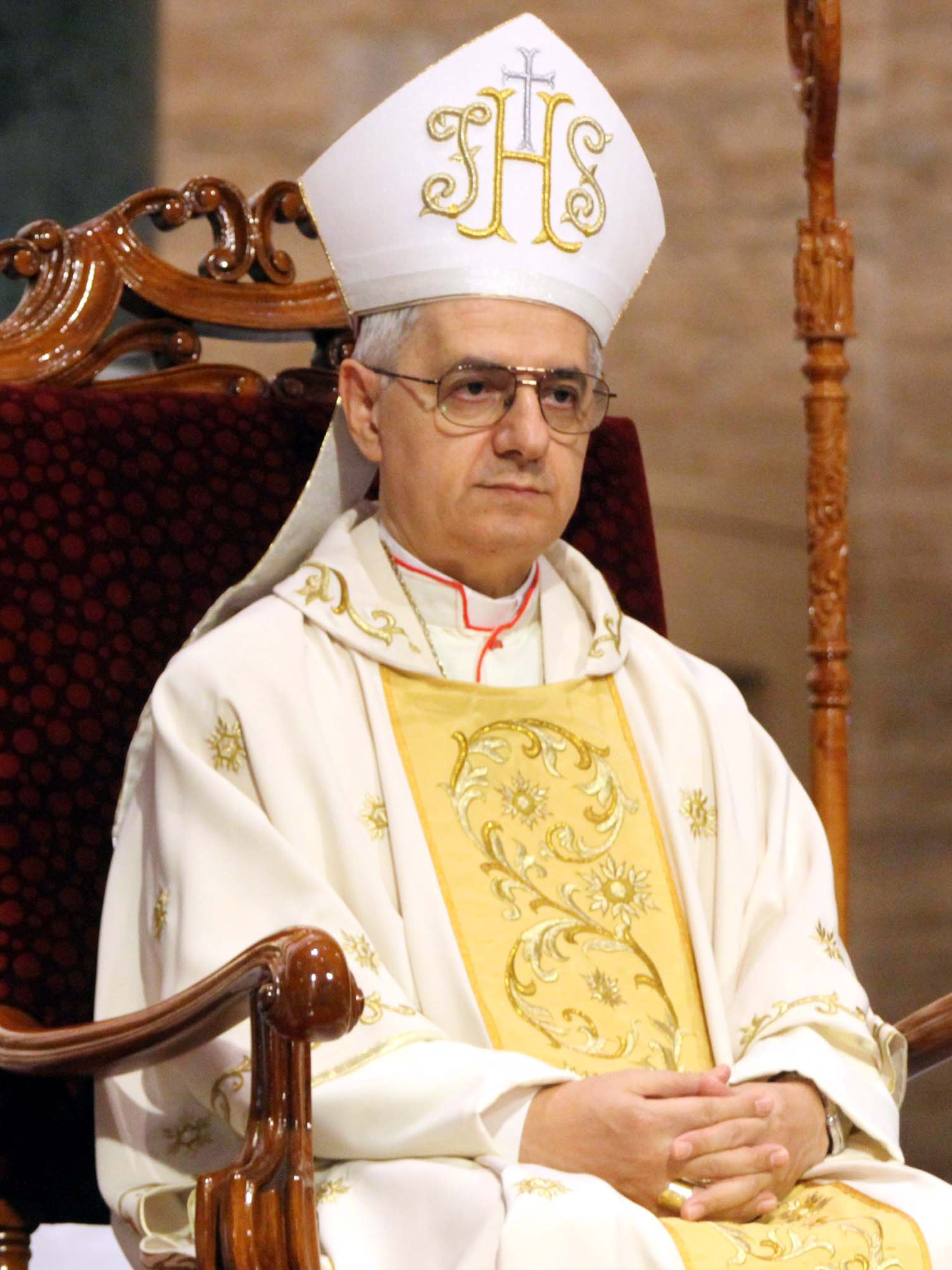
- Pinto in 2017
- Appointed: 1 July 2017
- Retired: 22 July 2019
- Predecessor: Alessandro D'Errico
- Successor: Giorgio Lingua
- Other post: Titular Archbishop of Anglona
- Previous posts: Apostolic Nuncio to the Philippines (2011-2017); Apostolic Nuncio to Chile (2007-2011); Apostolic Nuncio to Senegal, Cape Verde, Mali, Guinea-Bassau and Apostolic Delegate to Mauritania (2001-2007)

Orders
- Ordination: 1 April 1978
- Consecration: 6 January 2002 by Pope John Paul II, Leonardo Sandri and Robert Sarah

Personal details
- Born: 26 May 1952 (age 74) Noci, Italy
- Denomination: Roman Catholic
- Education: Pontifical Ecclesiastical Academy
- Motto: Caritas Christi
- Coat of arms

Styles of Giuseppe Pinto
- Reference style: His Excellency; The Most Reverend
- Spoken style: Your Excellency
- Religious style: Archbishop

Giuseppe Pinto (born 26 May 1952) is an Italian prelate of the Catholic Church who worked in the diplomatic service of the Holy See. He served as an Apostolic Nuncio from 2001 until his retirement in 2020. He joined the diplomatic service of the Holy See in 1984.

== Biography ==
Giuseppe Pinto was born in Noci, Italy, on 26 May 1952.

== Diplomatic career ==
To prepare for a diplomatic career, he entered the Pontifical Ecclesiastical Academy in 1980. He joined the diplomatic service of the Holy See on 1 May 1984.

On 4 December 2001, Pope John Paul II appointed him Apostolic Delegate to Mauritania and Apostolic Nuncio to Senegal, at the same time naming him titular archbishop of Anglona. On 5 February 2002, he was also appointed Apostolic Nuncio to Cape Verde and Mali. On 5 March he was appointed Nuncio to Guinea-Bissau.

Pope Benedict XVI appointed him Apostolic Nuncio to Chile on 6 December 2007.

On 10 May 2011, he was appointed Apostolic Nuncio to the Philippines.

On 1 July 2017, Pope Francis appointed him as Apostolic Nuncio to Croatia.

In 2018, a lawsuit against the Archdiocese of Santiago made public an email message written to Pinto in 2009 by Archbishop Francisco Javier Errázuriz, in which Errázuriz admitted to Pinto that had not followed the proper procedures for handling allegations of sexual abuse against Fernando Karadima, a priest at the centre of the sex abuse crisis in Chile.

He was replaced in Croatia in 2019, and Pope Francis accepted his resignation as nuncio on 31 July 2020.

== See also ==
- List of heads of the diplomatic missions of the Holy See

Diplomatic posts
Preceded by Edward Joseph Adams	Apostolic Nuncio to the Philippines; 10 May 2011 – 1 July 2017	Succeeded by Gabriele Giordano Caccia
