= Luigi Barbarito =

Catholic archbishop

The Most Reverend Luigi Barbarito
- Titular Archbishop of Fiorentino
- Church: Roman Catholic Church
- Appointed: 11 June 1969
- Installed: 10 August 1969
- Other post: Apostolic Nuncio Emeritus to Great Britain
- Previous posts: Apostolic Nuncio to Great Britain (1993-1997); Apostolic Pro-Nuncio to Great Britain (1986-1993); Apostolic Pro-Nuncio to Australia (1978-1986); Apostolic Pro-Nuncio to Senegal (1975-1978); Apostolic Pro-Nuncio to Niger (1975-1978); Apostolic Delegate to Mauritania (1975-1978); Apostolic Delegate to Mali (1975-1978); Apostolic Delegate to Guinea-Bissau (1975-1978); Apostolic Nuncio to Haiti (1969-1975)

Personal details
- Born: 19 April 1922 Atripalda, Italy
- Died: 12 March 2017 (aged 94)
- Denomination: Roman Catholic

Ordination history of Luigi Barbarito
History
Episcopal consecration
- Principal consecrator: Amleto Giovanni Cicognani (Frascati)
- Co-consecrators: Agostino Casaroli (Cartagine); Pasquale Venezia (Avellino)
Episcopal succession
Bishops consecrated by Luigi Barbarito as principal consecrator
- François Gayot: 2 February 1975
- Settimio Ferrazzetta: 19 June 1977
- Roderick Wright: 15 January 1991

Styles of Luigi Barbarito
- Reference style: The Most Reverend
- Spoken style: Your Grace
- Religious style: Archbishop

Luigi Barbarito (19 April 1922 – 12 March 2017) was an Italian prelate of the Catholic Church. He held the rank of archbishop while serving as a nuncio in the diplomatic service of the Holy See from 1969 to 1997.

== Early life ==
Born in Atripalda on 19 April 1922, Barbarito studied at the seminary of the Diocese of Avellino and at the Pontifical Seminary of Benevento.

He was ordained a priest on 20 August 1944.

He studied canon law at the Pontifical Gregorian University, graduating in July 1947.

== Diplomat ==
To prepare for a diplomatic career he completed the course of study at the Pontifical Ecclesiastical Academy in 1951. He began his diplomatic career with a posting to Oceania.

On 11 June 1969, Pope Paul VI appointed Barbarito Apostolic Nuncio to Haiti and named him titular archbishop of Fiorentino. He received his episcopal ordination from the hands of Cardinal Amleto Giovanni Cicognani, with co-consecrators Archbishop Agostino Casaroli and Bishop Pasquale Venezia.

On 5 April 1975, Pope Paul named him the Apostolic Pro-Nuncio in Niger and Senegal as well as Apostolic Delegate to Mali, Mauritania and Guinea-Bissau.

On 10 June 1978, Pope Paul appointed him Apostolic Pro-Nuncio to Australia.

On 21 January 1986 Pope John Paul II named him Apostolic Pro-Nuncio to Great Britain. His title changed to Apostolic Nuncio to Great Britain on 13 April 1993.

Pope John Paul accepted Barbarito's resignation on 31 July 1997.

During his career, he was a member of the Congregation for the Causes of Saints.

He died on 12 March 2017 in Pietradefusi and was buried in the church of Sant’Ippolisto in Atripalda, the church where he was baptized.

== Honours and titles ==
In 1994 Barbarito became Dean of the Diplomatic Corps in London, the longest-serving foreign diplomat there. Barbarito was appointed an Honorary Knight Grand Cross of the Royal Victorian Order (GCVO) by Queen Elizabeth II in 1996. In December 2013 Barbarito was awarded the title Ecclesiastical Knight Grand Cross of Grace of the Sacred Military Constantinian Order of Saint George, an order which he had been first invested into in 1986.

Catholic Church titles
New title	Titular Archbishop of Fiorentino; 1969–2017	Vacant
Preceded by Marie-Joseph Lemieux	Apostolic Nuncio to Haiti; 1969-1975	Succeeded by Luigi Conti
Preceded by Giovanni Mariani	Apostolic Pro-Nuncio to Senegal; 1975-1978	Succeeded by Luigi Dossena
Preceded by Giovanni Mariani	Apostolic Pro-Nuncio to Niger; 1975-1978	Succeeded by Luigi Dossena
Preceded by Giovanni Mariani	Apostolic Delegate to Mauritania; 1975-1978	Succeeded by Luigi Dossena
Preceded by Giovanni Mariani	Apostolic Delegate to Mali; 1975-1978	Succeeded by Luigi Dossena
New creation	Apostolic Delegate to Guinea-Bissau; 1975-1978	Succeeded by Luigi Dossena
Preceded by Gino Paro	Apostolic Pro-Nuncio to Australia; 1978-1986	Succeeded by Franco Brambilla
Preceded by Bruno Bernard Heim	Apostolic Pro-Nuncio and Nuncio to Great Britain; 1986-1993, 1993–1997	Succeeded by Pablo Puente Buces
