= Luigi Roberto Cona =

Italian Roman Catholic archbishop

His Excellency, The Most Reverend Luigi Roberto Cona
- Apostolic Nuncio to Syria
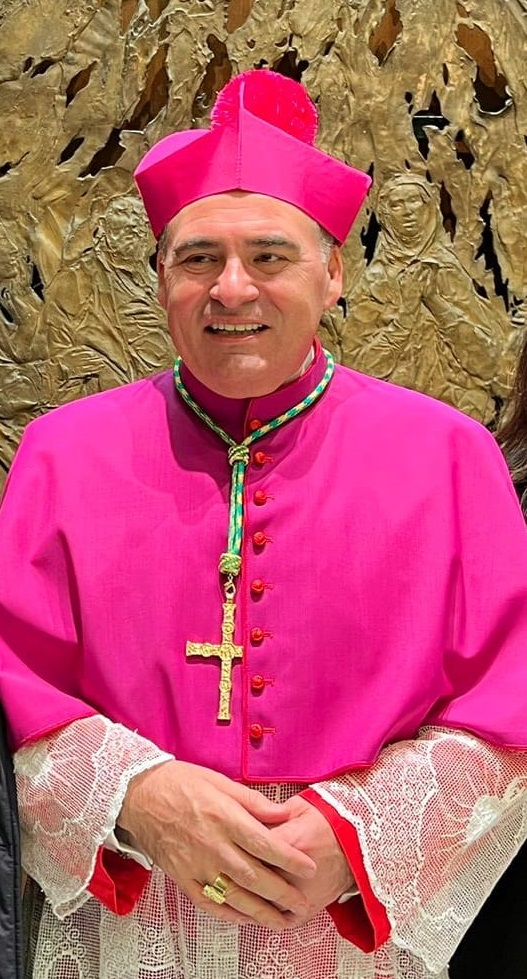
- Appointed: 19 March 2026
- Predecessor: Mario Zenari
- Other post: Titular Archbishop of Sala Consilina
- Previous post: Apostolic Nuncio to El Salvador (2022-2026)

Orders
- Ordination: 20 April 1990 by Vincenzo Cirrincione
- Consecration: 2 December 2022 by Pietro Parolin, Edgar Peña Parra and Rosario Gisana

Personal details
- Born: 10 November 1965 (age 60) Niscemi, Caltanissetta, Sicily, Italy
- Coat of arms

Styles of Luigi Roberto Cona
- Reference style: His Excellency; The Most Reverend
- Spoken style: Your Excellency
- Religious style: Archbishop

Luigi Roberto Cona (born 10 November 1965) is an Italian prelate of the Catholic Church who has served as Apostolic Nuncio to Syria since 2026. He is a diplomat in the service of the Holy See.

== Biography ==
Luigi Roberto Cona was born on 10 November 1965 in Niscemi, Sicily, Italy. He was ordained a priest for the Roman Catholic Diocese of Piazza Armerina on 20 April 1990. He has a degree in dogmatic theology.

== Diplomatic career ==
He entered the diplomatic service of the Holy See on 1 July 2003 and served in the apostolic nunciatures in Panama, Portugal, Cameroon, Morocco, Jordan, and Turkey, in the Section for General Affairs of the Secretariat of State, and in the Pontifical Representation in Italy. He was appointed assessor for general affairs of the Secretariat of State on 24 October 2019.

On 26 October 2022, Pope Francis appointed him titular archbishop of Sala Consilina and apostolic nuncio to El Salvador. He was consecrated a bishop on 2 December 2022.

On 19 March 2026, Pope Leo XIV appointed him Apostolic Nuncio to Syria. On 6 September, he was received by Syrian President Ahmed al-Sharaa, who accepted his credentials at the People's Palace.

== See also ==
- List of heads of the diplomatic missions of the Holy See
