= Giovanni Mariani =

Italian prelate

Giovanni Mariani (17 June 1919 – 23 January 1991) was an Italian prelate of the Catholic Church who spent his career in the diplomatic service of the Holy See. He had the rank of archbishop and the title of nuncio from 1967.

== Biography ==
Giovanni Mariani was born on 17 June 1919 in Santo Stefano d'Aveto, Province of Genoa, Italy. On 21 March 1942, he was ordained a priest for the Diocese of Bobbio.

He prepared for a diplomatic career by completing the course of study at the Pontifical Ecclesiastical Academy in 1946.

On 16 October 1967, Pope Paul VI gave him the general responsibilities of Apostolic Delegate to Western Africa, and then added a series of more specific assignments, beginning by naming him titular archbishop of Missua and Apostolic Pro-Nuncio to Senegal on 19 October. Cardinal Secretary of State Amleto Giovanni Cicognani consecrated him a bishop on 3 December. He was given additional responsibilities as Apostolic Pro-Nuncio to Niger on 28 August 1971, to Dahomey (Benin) on 29 March 1972, and to Ivory Coast on 19 June 1972; and as Apostolic Delegate to Mali and Mauritania on 17 October 1973.

On 11 January 1975, Pope Paul appointed him Apostolic Nuncio to Venezuela.

In January 1978, he became an official in the Secretariat of State.

On 25 April 1980, Pope John Paul II appointed him Apostolic Nuncio to Greece.

Mariani resigned on 5 May 1990 from that office.

He died on 3 January 1991.
