= Secretariat of State (Holy See) =

Branch of the Holy See that handles political and diplomatic functions

The Secretariat of State (Latin: Secretaria Status; Italian: Segreteria di Stato) is the oldest dicastery in the Roman Curia, the central papal governing bureaucracy of the Catholic Church. It is headed by the Cardinal Secretary of State and performs all the political and diplomatic functions of the Holy See. The Secretariat is divided into three sections: the Section for General Affairs, the Section for Relations with States, and, since 2017, the Section for Diplomatic Staff.

== History of the Secretariat of State ==
The origins of the Secretariat of State go back to the fifteenth century. The apostolic constitution Non Debet Reprehensibile of 31 December 1487 established the Secretaria Apostolica comprising twenty-four apostolic secretaries, one of whom bore the title Secretarius Domesticus and held a position of pre-eminence. One can also trace to this Secretaria Apostolica the Chancery of Briefs, the Secretariat of Briefs to Princes and the Secretariat of Latin Letters.

Pope Leo X established another position, the Secretarius Intimus, to assist the Cardinal who had control of the affairs of State and to attend to correspondence in languages other than Latin, chiefly with the Apostolic Nuncios (who at that time were evolving into permanent diplomatic representatives). From these beginnings, the Secretariat of State developed, especially at the time of the Council of Trent.

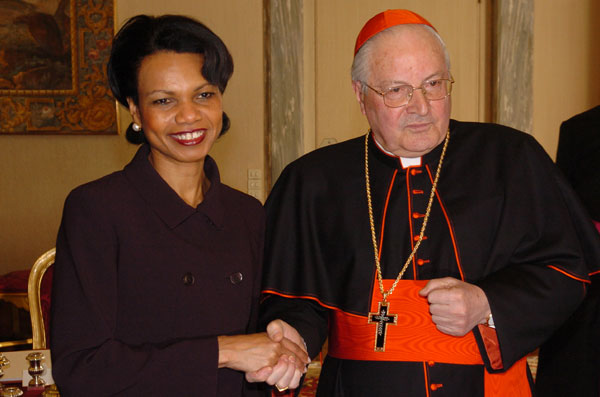
Two secretaries of state: Cardinal Angelo Sodano (former Secretary of State of the Holy See) with Condoleezza Rice (former U.S. Secretary of State)

For a long time, the Secretarius Intimus, also called Secretarius Papae or Secretarius Maior, was almost always a prelate, often endowed with episcopal rank. It was only at the beginning of the pontificate of Innocent X that someone already a Cardinal and not a member of the Pope's family was called to this high office. Pope Innocent XII definitively abolished the office of Cardinal Nephew, and the powers of that office were assigned to the Cardinal Secretary of State alone.

On 19 July 1814, Pope Pius VII established the Sacred Congregation for the Extraordinary Ecclesiastical Affairs, expanding the Congregatio super negotiis ecclesiasticis Regni Galliarum established by Pius VI in 1793. With the apostolic constitution Sapienti Consilio of 29 June 1908, Saint Pius X divided the Sacred Congregation for Extraordinary Ecclesiastical Affairs in the form fixed by the Codex Iuris Canonici of 1917 (Can. 263) and he specified the duties of each of the three sections: the first was concerned essentially with extraordinary affairs, while the second attended to the ordinary affairs, and the third, until then an independent body (the Chancery of Apostolic Briefs), had the duty of preparing and dispatching pontifical Briefs.

With the apostolic constitution Regimini Ecclesiae universae of 15 August 1967, Pope Paul VI reformed the Roman Curia, implementing the desire expressed by the bishops in the Second Vatican Council. This gave a new face to the Secretariat of State, suppressing the Chancery of Apostolic Briefs, formerly the third section, and transforming the former first section, the Sacred Congregation for the Extraordinary Ecclesiastical Affairs, into a body distinct from the Secretariat of State, though closely related to it, which was to be known as the Council for the Public Affairs of the Church.

=== Loss of assets and corruption investigation ===
In December 2020, Pope Francis enacted legislation stripping the Secretariat of State of its financial assets and real estate holdings following its bungled management of hundreds of millions of euros in donations. Controversial investments which were made by the Vatican Secretariat of State department also became subject to a corruption investigation.

== Structure ==
On 28 June 1988, John Paul II promulgated the apostolic constitution Pastor bonus, which introduced a reform of the Roman Curia and divided the Secretariat of State into two sections: the Section for General Affairs and the Section for Relations with States, which incorporated the Council for the Public Affairs of the Church. Pope Francis added a third unit, the Section for Diplomatic Staff, in November 2017.

The head of the Secretariat of State is the Secretary of State, who is a cardinal. The Cardinal Secretary of State is primarily responsible for the diplomatic and political activity of the Holy See, in some circumstances representing the Pope himself. The Secretary of State is typically viewed as the second most powerful person in the Vatican.

== Section for General Affairs ==
The Section for General Affairs handles the normal operations of the Church including organizing the activities of the Roman Curia, making appointments to curial offices, publishing official communications, papal documents, handling the concerns of embassies to the Holy See, and keeping the papal seal and Fisherman's Ring. Abroad, the Section for General Affairs is responsible for organizing the activities of nuncios around the world in their activities concerning the local church.

=== Substitute for General Affairs ===
The Section for General Affairs is headed by an archbishop known as the Substitute for General Affairs, or more formally, Substitute for General Affairs to the Secretary of State. The position of Substitute (substituto) has also been regarded as being equivalent to the papal chief of staff, with Crux even describing the Substitute as being "the only figure in the Vatican system with the right to see the pope on a routine basis without an appointment." There have been 11 Substitutes since 1953:

- Nicola Canali (21 March 1908 – 24 September 1914)
- Federico Tedeschini (24 September 1914 – 31 March 1921)
- Giovanni Battista Montini (13 December 1937 – 17 February 1953) (Later Pope Paul VI)
- Angelo Dell'Acqua (17 February 1953 – 29 June 1967)
- Giovanni Benelli (29 June 1967 – 3 June 1977)
- Giuseppe Caprio (14 June 1977 – 28 April 1979)
- Eduardo Martínez Somalo (5 May 1979 – 23 March 1988)
- Edward Idris Cassidy (23 March 1988 – 12 December 1989)
- Giovanni Battista Re (12 December 1989 – 16 September 2000)
- Leonardo Sandri (16 September 2000 – 1 July 2007)
- Fernando Filoni (1 July 2007 – 10 May 2011)
- Giovanni Angelo Becciu (10 May 2011 – 29 June 2018)
- Edgar Peña Parra (15 October 2018 – 30 March 2026)
- Paolo Rudelli (30 March 2026 – present)

=== Assessor for General Affairs of the Secretariat of State ===
The deputy to the Substitute for General Affairs, effectively deputy chief of staff, is called the Assessor for General Affairs of the Secretariat of State. The current Assessor for General Affairs of the Secretariat of State is Monsignor Anthony Onyemuche Ekpo.

- Eduardo Martínez Somalo (1970 – 11 December 1975)
- Giovanni Battista Re (12 January 1979 – 9 October 1987)
- Crescenzio Sepe (10 October 1987 – 2 February 1992)
- Leonardo Sandri (4 February 1992 – 22 July 1997)
- James Michael Harvey (22 July 1997 – 7 February 1998)
- Pedro Lopez Quintana (7 February 1998 – 12 December 2002)
- Gabriele Giordano Caccia (17 December 2002 – 16 July 2009)
- Peter Bryan Wells (16 July 2009 – 9 February 2016)
- Paolo Borgia (4 March 2016 – 3 September 2019)
- Luigi Roberto Cona (24 October 2019 – 26 October 2022)
- Roberto Campisi (26 October 2022 – 27 September 2025)
- Anthony Onyemuche Ekpo (19 November 2025 - )

== Section for Relations with States ==
=== Origin ===
The Congregation for the Ecclesiastical Affairs of the Kingdom of France was set up by Pope Pius VI with the Constitution Sollicitudo omnium ecclesiarum in 1793 to deal with the problems created for the Church by the French Revolution. In 1814, Pope Pius VII gave this office responsibility for negotiations with all governments, renaming it the Extraordinary Congregation for the Ecclesiastical Affairs of the Catholic World (Latin: Congregatio Extraordinaria Praeposita Negotiis Ecclesiasticis Orbis Catholici). Some years later, Pope Leo XII changed its name to the Sacred Congregation for Extraordinary Ecclesiastical Affairs (Latin: Sacra Congregatio pro Negotiis Ecclesiasticis Extraordinariis), which remained its title until 1967 when Pope Paul VI separated this body from the Secretariat of State, calling it the Council for the Public Affairs of the Church. This council was later replaced by the present Section for Relations with States.

=== Responsibilities ===
The Section is responsible for the Holy See's interactions with civil governments. According to the relevant articles of the apostolic constitution Pastor bonus, the responsibilities of the Secretary for Relations with States are:

- for the Holy See's diplomatic relations with states, including the establishment of concordats or similar agreements;
- for the Holy See's presence in international organizations and conferences such as the United Nations;
- in special circumstances, by order of the Supreme Pontiff and in consultation with the competent dicasteries of the Curia, provides for appointments to particular Churches, and for their establishment or modification;
- in close collaboration with the Congregation for Bishops, it attends to the appointment of bishops in countries which have entered into treaties or agreements with the Holy See in accordance with the norms of international law.

=== Structure ===
The Section is headed by an Archbishop, the Secretary for Relations with States, who reports to the Secretary of State. His staff includes a Prelate, the Under-Secretary for Relations with States, and is assisted by Cardinals and Bishops. The Secretary for Relations with States is often called the foreign minister of the Holy See, and the Under-Secretary is often called the deputy foreign minister.

The current Secretary for Relations with States is Archbishop Paul Gallagher. The current Undersecretary for Relations with States is Monsignor Mirosław Stanisław Wachowski. The current Delegate for Pontifical Representations is Archbishop Jan Romeo Pawłowski and the current Head of Protocol is Monsignor Javier Domingo Fernández González.

== Section for Diplomatic Staff ==
On 21 November 2017, the Secretariat announced that Pope Francis had created the Section for Diplomatic Staff, expanding the responsibilities of the Delegate for Pontifical Representations. It has been operating since 9 November 2017. Since its creation it has been headed by Archbishop Jan Romeo Pawłowski. He was succeeded in the role by Archbishop Luciano Russo in 2022.

In 2022, this section was included in the organizational structure of the Roman Curia detailed in the apostolic constitution Praedicate evangelium.

== See also ==
- Latin Letters Office
- Index of Vatican City-related articles
