= Alessandro D'Errico =

Italian prelate

His Excellency, The Most Reverend Alessandro D'Errico
- Apostolic Nuncio emeritus of Libya and Malta; Titular Archbishop of Carini
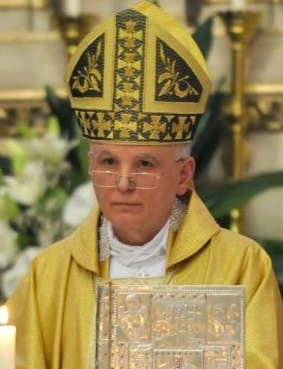
- Appointed: 27 April 2017
- Retired: 30 April 2022
- Predecessor: Aldo Cavalli
- Other post: Titular Archbishop of Carini
- Previous posts: Apostolic Nuncio to Croatia (2012-2017); Apostolic Nuncio to Montenegro (2010-2012); Apostolic Nuncio to Bosnia and Herzegovina (2005-2010); Apostolic Nuncio to Pakistan (1998-2005)

Orders
- Ordination: 24 March 1974 by Antonio Cece
- Consecration: 6 January 1999 by Pope John Paul II, Giovanni Battista Re and Francesco Monterisi

Personal details
- Born: Alessandro D'Errico; 18 November 1950 (age 75) Frattamaggiore, Italy
- Denomination: Catholic
- Occupation: Diplomat
- Education: Pontifical Ecclesiastical Academy; Pontifical Lateran University
- Motto: VENI SANCTE SPIRITUS
- Coat of arms

Styles of Alessandro D'Errico
- Reference style: Most Reverend
- Spoken style: Your Excellency
- Religious style: Bishop

Alessandro D'Errico (born 18 November 1950) is an Italian prelate of the Catholic Church. He has spent his career in the diplomatic service of the Holy See and was the Apostolic Nuncio to Libya and to Malta from 2017 to 2022.

== Biography ==
Alessandro D'Errico was born in the Frattamaggiore comune of the Metropolitan City of Naples on 18 November 1950 to Alberto and Rosa née Vitale, the first of five children. He studied at the seminary in Aversa and was ordained a priest of the Diocese of Aversa on 24 March 1974. He then earned a degree in philosophy at the University of Naples and a licentiate in canon law at the Pontifical Lateran University, and a bachelor’s in theology at the San Luigi Papal Theological Seminary of Southern Italy. Finally he earned a diploma from the Pontifical Ecclesiastical Academy.

== Diplomatic career ==
He entered the diplomatic service of the Holy See on 5 March 1977 and filled positions in Thailand (1977-1981), Brazil (1981-1984), Greece (1984-1986), Italy (1987-1992), and Poland (1992-1998).

On 14 November 1998, Pope John Paul II named him titular archbishop of Carini and Apostolic Nuncio to Pakistan.

He received his episcopal consecration from Pope John Paul on 6 January 1999.

On 21 November 2005, Pope Benedict XVI appointed him Nuncio to Bosnia-Herzegovina.

On 17 February 2010, Benedict named him Nuncio to Montenegro.

On 21 May 2012, Benedict named him Nuncio to Croatia.

On 27 April 2017, Pope Francis appointed him Nuncio to Malta and on 10 June 2017 Nuncio to Libya as well.

Pope Francis accepted his resignation from his posts as nuncio on 30 April 2022.

== See also ==
- List of heads of the diplomatic missions of the Holy See

Diplomatic posts
Preceded by Renzo Fratini	Apostolic Nuncio to Pakistan; 14 November 1998 – 21 November 2005	Succeeded by Adolfo Tito Yllana
Preceded by Santos Abril y Castelló	Apostolic Nuncio to Bosnia and Herzegovina; 21 November 2005 – 21 May 2012	Succeeded by Luigi Pezzuto
Preceded by Angelo Mottola	Apostolic Nuncio to Montenegro; 17 Feb 2010 – 21 May 2012	Succeeded by Luigi Pezzuto
Preceded by Mario Roberto Cassari	Apostolic Nuncio to Croatia; 21 May 2012 – 26 April 2017	Succeeded by Giuseppe Pinto
Preceded by Mario Roberto Cassari	Apostolic Nuncio to Malta; 26 April 2017 - 30 April 2022	Vacant
Preceded by Mario Roberto Cassari	Apostolic Nuncio to Libya; 10 June 2017 - 30 April 2022	Vacant
