= Luigi Pezzuto =

Italian prelate of the Catholic Church (born 1946)

His Excellency, The Most Reverend Luigi Pezzuto
- Apostolic Nuncio emeritus of Bosnia and Herzegovina and Montenegro; Titular Archbishop of Turris in Proconsulari
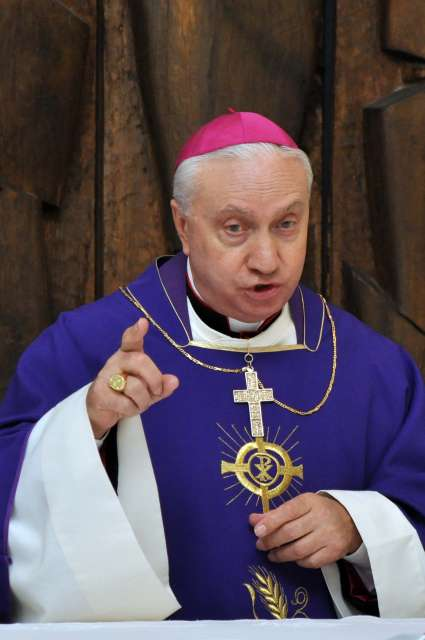
- Appointed: 17 November 2012
- Retired: 31 August 2021
- Predecessor: Alessandro D'Errico
- Other post: Titular Archbishop of Turris in Proconsulari
- Previous posts: Apostolic Nuncio to Monaco (2016-2019); Apostolic Nuncio to El Salvador and Belize (2005-2012); Apostolic Nuncio to Tanzania (1999-2005); Apostolic Nuncio to the Republic of the Congo and Gabon (1996-1999)

Orders
- Ordination: 25 September 1971 by Francesco Minerva
- Consecration: 6 January 1997 by Pope John Paul II, Giovanni Battista Re and Myroslav Marusyn

Personal details
- Born: Luigi Pezzuto; 30 April 1946 (age 80) Squinzano, Italy
- Denomination: Roman Catholic
- Occupation: Nuncio
- Motto: CARITAS IN VERITATE
- Coat of arms

Styles of Luigi Pezzuto
- Reference style: His Excellency; The Most Reverend
- Spoken style: Your Excellency
- Religious style: Archbishop

Luigi Pezzuto (born 30 April 1946) is an Italian prelate of the Catholic Church who worked in the diplomatic service of the Holy See. He ended his career serving as the Apostolic Nuncio to Bosnia and Herzegovina and Montenegro from 17 November 2012 to 31 August 2021. He was made an archbishop in 1997 and led the diplomatic missions in several countries in Africa and Latin America between 1997 and 2012.

== Biography ==
He was born in Squinzano, Italy. He was ordained a priest on 25 September 1971.

== Diplomatic career ==
Pope John Paul II appointed him Titular Archbishop of Turris in Proconsulari and Apostolic Nuncio to the Republic of the Congo and to Gabon on 7 December 1996. He received his episcopal consecration on 6 January 1997.

He was named Nuncio to Tanzania on 22 May 1999.

On 2 April 2005 John Paul named him Nuncio to El Salvador.

On 7 May, he was nominated Nuncio to Belize by Pope Benedict XVI.

The same Pope named him Nuncio to Bosnia-Herzegovina and to Montenegro on 17 November 2012.

He was named Apostolic Nuncio to Monaco as well on 16 January 2016. His term as nuncio there ended with the appointment of his successor on 25 May 2019.

Pope Francis accepted his resignation from his other positions on 31 August 2021.

== See also ==
- List of heads of the diplomatic missions of the Holy See

Diplomatic posts
Preceded by Alessandro D'Errico	Apostolic Nunciature to Bosnia and Herzegovina; Apostolic Nunciature to Montenegro; 17 November 2012 – 31 August 2021	Vacant
