= Giovanni Pietro Dal Toso =

Italian Roman Catholic prelate (born 1964)

The Most Reverend Giovanni Pietro Dal Toso
- Apostolic Nuncio to Jordan and Cyprus; Titular Archbishop of Foratiana
- Church: Roman Catholic Church
- Appointed: 21 January 2023
- Predecessor: Alberto Ortega Martín
- Other posts: Titular Archbishop of Foratiana (2017-); Secretary Delegate of the Dicastery for Promoting Integral Human Development (2017-)
- Previous posts: Adjunct Secretary of the Congregation for the Evangelization of Peoples (2017-2023); Secretary of the Pontifical Council Cor unum (2010-17); Undersecretary of the Pontifical Council Cor unum (2004-10)

Orders
- Ordination: 24 June 1989 by Wilhelm Emil Egger
- Consecration: 16 December 2017 by Fernando Filoni, Paul Josef Cordes and Ivo Muser

Personal details
- Born: Giampietro Dal Toso; 6 October 1964 (age 62) Vicenza, Italy
- Education: University of Innsbruck; Pontifical Gregorian University; Pontifical Lateran University
- Motto: Opportet illum crescere
- Coat of arms

Styles of Giovanni Pietro Dal Toso
- Reference style: His Excellency; The Most Reverend
- Spoken style: Your Excellency
- Religious style: Archbishop

Giovanni Pietro Dal Toso PhD JCL (born 6 October 1964 in Vicenza, Italy) is an Italian Roman Catholic prelate who works in the diplomatic service of the Holy See.

== Biography ==
After studying classics, he attended the major seminary of Brixen, completing his studies in philosophy and theology at the Higher Institute of Philosophy and Theology of Brixen, earning the title Magister Theologiae at the faculty of theology at the University of Innsbruck, Austria.

He was ordained a priest on 24 June 1989 for the Diocese of Bolzano-Brixen. After three years of ministry in the diocese, he studied philosophy at the Pontifical Gregorian University, receiving his doctorate in December 1997 with a thesis entitled: "The concept of proairesis in Gregory of Nyssa". In June 2001 he obtained a licentiate in canon law from the Pontifical Lateran University.

== Diplomatic career ==
From 1 March 1996, he served as an official at the Secretary of the Pontifical Council "Cor unum". He was appointed Under-Secretary on 21 June 2004. He is a member of the Special Committee for dealing with cases of nullity of sacred ordination and release from obligations of the diaconate and priesthood established by the Congregation for Divine Worship and the Discipline of the Sacraments and then, when this competence was moved, at the Congregation for the Clergy.

He was appointed as secretary of the Secretary of the Pontifical Council "Cor unum" by Pope Benedict XVI on 22 June 2010 until 1 January 2017, when Council was dissolved. After the dissolution of the Pontifical Council in January 2017, he was appointed as secretary delegate of the newly erected Dicastery for Promoting Integral Human Development.

In November 2017 he became Adjunct Secretary of the Congregation for the Evangelization of Peoples, succeeding Protase Rugambwa who moved up to Secretary. He was concurrently named titular archbishop of Foratiana and President of the Pontifical Mission Societies upon his appointment as Adjunct Secretary.

On 21 January 2023, Pope Francis appointed his as Apostolic Nuncio to Jordan. He will reside in Amman. This is the first time the nuncio will reside in Jordan. On 17 February 2023, he was named as apostolic nuncio to Cyprus as well.

Since September 2008 he has been a member of the Special Commission for dealing with cases of dissolution of marriage in favorem fidei of the Congregation for the Doctrine of the Faith. He knows Italian, German, French, English and Spanish.

== See also ==
- List of heads of the diplomatic missions of the Holy See

Catholic Church titles
Preceded by Karl Kasteel	Secretary of the Pontifical Council "Cor unum" 22 June 2010–1 January 2017	Succeeded by dissolved
Preceded by Piergiuseppe Vacchelli	Adjunct Secretary of the Congregation for the Evangelization of Peoples; 9 November 2017–21 January 2023	Succeeded by vacant
Diplomatic posts
Preceded by Alberto Ortega Martín	Apostolic Nuncio to Jordan; 21 January 2023–present	Succeeded by Incumbent
Preceded by Adolfo Tito Yllana	Apostolic Nuncio to Cyprus; 17 February 2023–present	Succeeded by Incumbent
