= Apostolic Nunciature to Montenegro =

Diplomatic post of the Holy See

The Apostolic Nunciature to Montenegro is an ecclesiastical office of the Catholic Church in Montenegro. It is a diplomatic post of the Holy See, whose representative is called the Apostolic Nuncio with the rank of an ambassador.

Montenegro became an independent nation on 3 June 2006, dissolving its relationship with Serbia in the short-lived State Union of Serbia and Montenegro as the successor state to the Federal Republic of Yugoslavia. The Holy See and Montenegro agreed to establish diplomatic relations and exchange ambassadors on 16 December 2006, and Montenegro's ambassador Antun Sbutega presented his credentials at the Vatican on 22 January 2007. Three days later, Pope Benedict XVI named Archbishop Angelo Mottola as its first Apostolic Nuncio to Montenegro.

The title Apostolic Nuncio to Montenegro is held by the prelate appointed Apostolic Nuncio to Bosnia and Herzegovina; he resides in Bosnia and Herzegovina.

== Representatives of the Holy See to Montenegro ==
Apostolic nuncios

- Angelo Mottola (25 January 2007 – 10 January 2010)
- Alessandro D'Errico (17 February 2010 – 21 May 2012)
- Luigi Pezzuto (17 November 2012 – 31 August 2021)
- Francis Chullikatt (01 October 2022 – present)

== See also ==
- Foreign relations of the Holy See
- List of diplomatic missions of the Holy See
