= Filoni =

Filoni is an Italian surname. Notable people with this surname include:

- Dave Filoni (born 1974), American filmmaker and producer, president of Lucasfilm since 2026
- Fernando Filoni (born 1946), Italian cardinal
