= Leopoldo Girelli =

Italian Catholic bishop and diplomat

His Excellency, The Most Reverend Leopoldo Girelli
- Apostolic Nuncio to Croatia
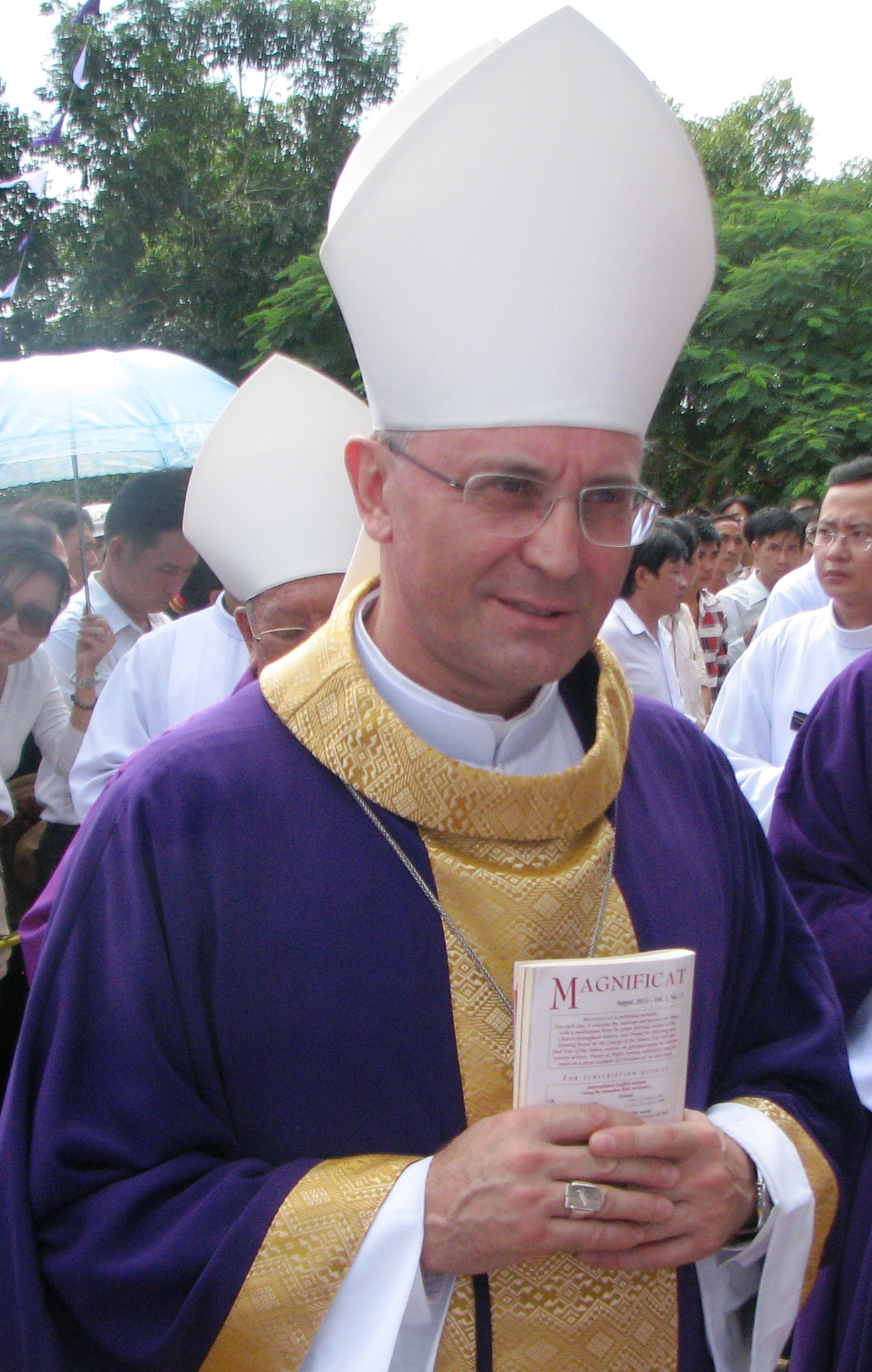
- Girelli in 2013, concelebrating a funeral Mass in Vietnam
- Appointed: 13 March 2026
- Predecessor: Giorgio Lingua
- Other post: Titular Archbishop of Capreae
- Previous posts: Apostolic Nuncio to India and Nepal (2021-2026); Apostolic Nuncio to Cyprus, Israel and Apostolic Delegate to Jerusalem and Palestine (2017-2021); Apostolic Nuncio to Singapore (2011-2017); Papal Representative to Vietnam (2011-2017); Apostolic Nuncio to ASEAN (2011-2017); Apostolic Delegate/Nuncio to Malaysia (2011-2013); Apostolic Delegate to Brunei (2011-2013); Apostolic Nuncio to Timor-Leste (2006-2013); Apostolic Nuncio to Indonesia (2006-2011)

Orders
- Ordination: 17 June 1978 by Giulio Oggioni
- Consecration: 17 June 2006 by Angelo Sodano

Personal details
- Born: 13 March 1953 (age 73) Predore, Italy
- Education: Pontifical Ecclesiastical Academy
- Motto: Evangelium et pax

Styles of Leopoldo Girelli
- Reference style: His Excellency; The Most Reverend
- Spoken style: Your Excellency
- Religious style: Archbishop

Leopoldo Girelli (born 13 March 1953) is an Italian prelate of the Catholic Church who serves as the apostolic nuncio to Croatia. He was nuncio to Israel and Cyprus, India and Nepal as well as apostolic delegate to Jerusalem and Palestine from 2017 to 2021. He has worked in the diplomatic service of the Holy See since 1987 and previously served as nuncio to Indonesia, East Timor, and Singapore.

== Biography ==
Girelli was born in Predore, Province of Bergamo, Italy, on 13 March 1953.

He was ordained a priest on 17 June 1978 and incardinated in the diocese of Bergamo. He graduated in theology. To prepare for the diplomatic service, he completed a course of study at the Pontifical Ecclesiastical Academy in 1984.

== Diplomatic career ==
He entered the diplomatic service of the Holy See on 13 July 1987 and worked in the papal diplomatic missions in Cameroon and New Zealand at the Section for General Affairs of the Secretariat of State, and finally in the Apostolic Nunciature to the United States where he held the rank of Counsellor.

On 13 April 2006, Pope Benedict XVI appointed him apostolic nuncio to Indonesia and titular Archbishop of Capreae. He was consecrated bishop on 17 June, with Cardinal Angelo Sodano as principal consecrator. On 10 October 2006, he was appointed apostolic nuncio to East Timor in addition to his duties as nuncio to Indonesia.

On 13 January 2011, he was appointed Apostolic Nuncio to Singapore, Apostolic Delegate to Malaysia and Brunei Darussalam, and non-residential papal representative for Vietnam. (Note: When diplomatic relations with Malaysia were established on 27 July 2011, Girelli continued, pending the appointment of the first nuncio to that country, to act as non-diplomatic Apostolic Delegate for Malaysia, accredited to the Catholic Church in the country but not to the Government. The 2012 Annuario Pontificio gave no indication of where the first Nuncio to Malaysia was to be resident, whether in Malaysia, Singapore or elsewhere.) He was the first papal representative appointed for Vietnam since the expulsion of the resident Apostolic Delegate in 1975. (Note: His appointment was approved by the Vietnamese Government, although Apostolic Delegates, being accredited not to the Government but to the Church in the country, are normally assigned without prior consultation of the Government. Accordingly, the 2012 Annuario Pontificio, the first edition published after the change, classified the papal representative office for Vietnam as an Apostolic Delegation but referred to Archbishop Girelli not as an Apostolic Delegate but as Papal Representative for Vietnam.) On 18 June 2011 Girelli was also appointed Apostolic Nuncio to the Association of Southeast Asian Nations (ASEAN); he was the first to hold that title. On 16 January 2013, he was replaced as representative to Malaysia, Brunei, and East Timor, while continuing in his posts in Singapore, Vietnam, and the ASEAN.

On 13 September 2017, Pope Francis appointed Girelli Apostolic Nuncio to Israel and Apostolic Delegate to Jerusalem and Palestine. Two days later, Girelli was also appointed Apostolic Nuncio to Cyprus.

On 13 March 2021, Pope Francis appointed him Apostolic Nuncio to India and added the title of Apostolic Nuncio to Nepal on 13 September of that year.

On 13 March 2026, Pope Leo XIV appointed him as nuncio to Croatia.

== See also ==
- List of heads of the diplomatic missions of the Holy See

Diplomatic posts
Preceded by Albert Malcolm Ranjith Patabendige Don	Apostolic Nuncio to Indonesia; 13 April 2006 – 13 January 2011	Succeeded by Antonio Guido Filipazzi
Preceded by Albert Malcolm Ranjith Patabendige Don	Apostolic Nuncio to East Timor; 10 October 2006 - 16 January 2013	Succeeded by Joseph Salvador Marino
Preceded by Salvatore Pennacchio	Apostolic Delegate to Brunei; 13 January 2011 - 16 January 2013	Succeeded by Joseph Salvador Marino
Preceded by Salvatore Pennacchio	Apostolic Nuncio to Malaysia; 13 January 2011 - 16 January 2013	Succeeded by Joseph Salvador Marino
Preceded by Salvatore Pennacchio	Apostolic Nuncio to Singapore; 13 January 2011 - 13 September 2017	Succeeded by Marek Zalewski
New title	Papal Representative to Vietnam; 13 January 2011 - 13 September 2017	Succeeded by Marek Zalewski
New title	Apostolic Nuncio to the ASEAN; 18 June 2011 - 13 September 2017	Succeeded by Piero Pioppo
Preceded by Giuseppe Lazzarotto	Apostolic Nuncio to Israel; 13 September 2017 – 13 March 2021	Succeeded by Adolfo Tito Yllana
Preceded by Giuseppe Lazzarotto	Apostolic Delegate to Jerusalem and Palestine; 13 September 2017 - 13 March 2021	Succeeded by Adolfo Tito Yllana
Preceded by Giuseppe Lazzarotto	Apostolic Nuncio to Cyprus; 15 September 2017 - 13 March 2021	Succeeded by Adolfo Tito Yllana
Preceded by Giambattista Diquattro	Apostolic Nuncio to India; 13 March 2021 - 13 March 2026	Vacant
Preceded by Giambattista Diquattro	Apostolic Nuncio to Nepal; 13 September 2021 – 13 March 2026	Vacant
Preceded by Giorgio Lingua	Apostolic Nuncio to Croatia; 13 March 2026 – present	Incumbent
