= Basilica of the National Shrine of Our Lady of Coromoto =

Coordinates: 8.9154°N 69.7729°W

- Basílica Menor Santuario Nacional Nuestra Señora de Coromoto
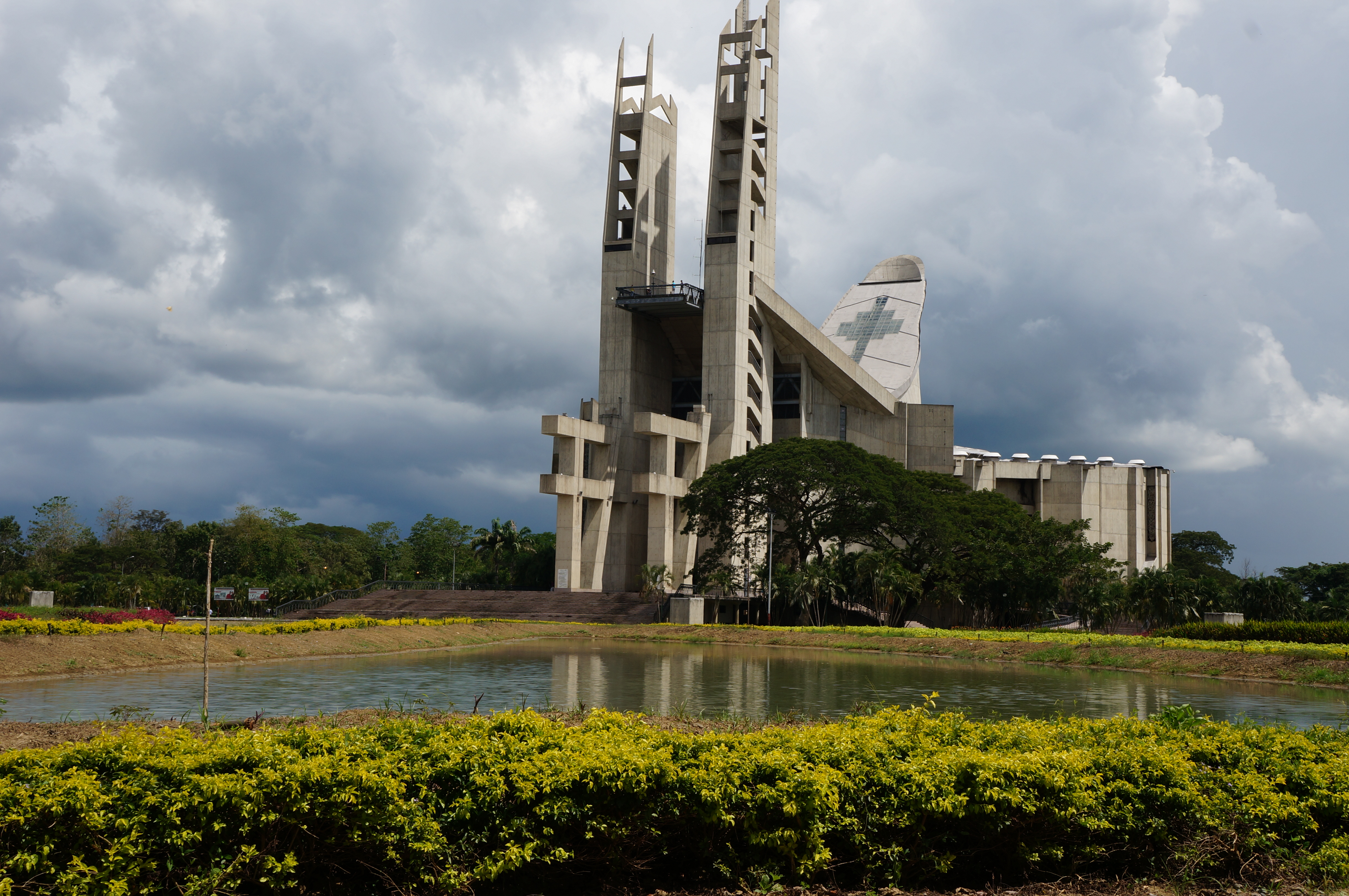
- Basilica of the National Shrine of Our Lady of Coromoto
- Location: San Genaro de Boconoíto
- Country: Venezuela
- Denomination: Roman Catholic Church

The Basilica of the National Shrine of Our Lady of Coromoto (Spanish: Basílica Menor Santuario Nacional Nuestra Señora de Coromoto) is a minor Basilica and National Shrine dedicated in honor of Our Lady of Coromoto, patroness of Venezuela is 25 kilometers from the city of Guanare, Portuguesa, Venezuela. Today its pastor is the priest Allender Hernández.

The shrine is built on the site where the faithful believe the Virgin appeared to the Native American chief Coromoto.

The construction project was prepared in 1975 by exiled Spanish architect Juan Capdevila Elías and Venezuelan architect Erasmo Calvani, but it was not until early 1980 when work began.

The work was interrupted several times, so it was in February 1996 when it finally could be consecrated by Pope John Paul II, in the presence of more than two million devotees awaiting the consecration of the church. On October 20, 2007, it was elevated by Pope Benedict XVI to the dignity of minor basilica.

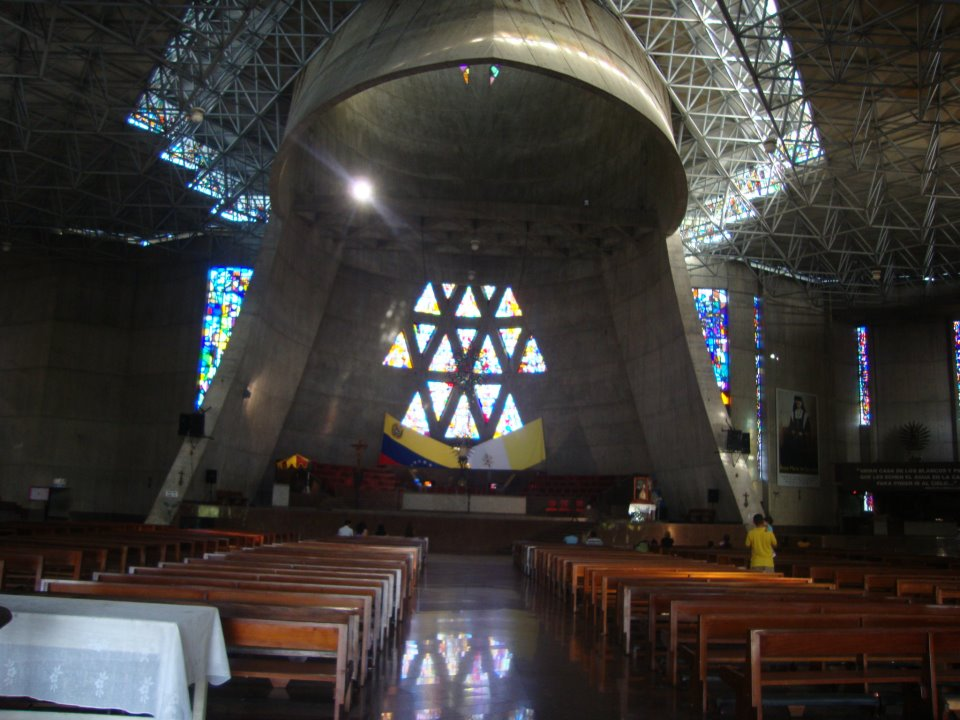
Internal View

== See also ==
- Basilica of the Holy Spirit, La Grita
- Roman Catholicism in Venezuela
- Our Lady of Coromoto
