= Nostra Signora di Coromoto =

- Church of Our Lady of Coromoto
- Chiesa di Nostra Signora di Coromoto
- Click on the map for a fullscreen view
- 41°51′46″N 12°26′46″E
- Location: Largo Nostra Signora di Coromoto 2, Gianicolense, Rome
- Country: Italy
- Language(s): Italian, Latin
- Denomination: Catholic
- Tradition: Roman Rite
- Website: coromoto.it

History
- Status: titular church, parish church, national church
- Dedication: Our Lady of Coromoto
- Earlier dedication: Was originally to be dedicated to Saint John of God
- Consecrated: 17 September 1978

Architecture
- Architect: Massimo Battaglini
- Architectural type: Modern
- Groundbreaking: December 1976
- Completed: 1978

Administration
- Diocese: Rome

Nostra Signora di Coromoto is a 20th-century parochial church and titular church in southwest Rome, dedicated to Our Lady of Coromoto.

== History ==
The church was built in 1976–78; contributions from Italian Venezuelans led it to be named for that country's patron, Our Lady of Coromoto. It is visited by Venezuelans but is not their official national church. It is square, with a cross-beam roof of laminated wood. The presbytery is illuminated from above by natural light.

Pope John Paul II visited in 1981. On 25 May 1985, it was made a titular church to be held by a cardinal-deacon. The title is named Nostra Signora di Coromoto e San Giovanni di Dio, because the church was originally to be dedicated to Saint John of God, but that is not the name of the church.

Cardinal-protectors

- Rosalio José Castillo Lara (1985–2007); elevated to cardinal-priest pro hac vice in 1996
- Fernando Filoni (2012–present); elevated to cardinal-bishop pro hac vice in 2018
