= Apostolic Nunciature to Jordan =

Diplomatic post of the Holy See

The Apostolic Nunciature to Jordan is an ecclesiastical office of the Catholic Church in Jordan. It is a diplomatic post of the Holy See, whose representative is called the Apostolic Nuncio with the rank of an ambassador. The Apostolic Nuncio to Jordan is usually also the Apostolic Nuncio to Cyprus upon his appointment to said nation.

== Apostolic Nuncios to Jordan ==
- Giuseppe Lazzarotto (23 July 1994 – 11 November 2000)
- Fernando Filoni (17 January 2001 – 25 February 2006)
- Francis Assisi Chullikatt (29 April 2006 – 17 July 2010)
- Giorgio Lingua (4 September 2010 – 17 March 2015)
- Alberto Ortega Martín (1 August 2015 – 7 October 2019)
- Giovanni Pietro Dal Toso (21 January 2023 – present)

== See also ==
- Foreign relations of the Holy See
- List of diplomatic missions of the Holy See
