= Apostolic Nunciature to ASEAN =

Diplomatic mission of the Holy See

The Apostolic Nunciature to the Association of Southeast Asian Nations or ASEAN is an ecclesiastical office of the Catholic Church. It is a diplomatic post of the Holy See, whose representative is called the Apostolic Nuncio with the rank of an ambassador. The two prelates who have served as nuncio have held other offices concurrently and the offices of the Nunciature to ASEAN, first located in Singapore are now based in Jakarta, Indonesia.

The only other representation of the Holy See to an international organization at the nunciature level is the Apostolic Nunciature to the European Union.

The Nunciature was established on 18 June 2011 with the appointment of the first nuncio, Archbishop Leopoldo Girelli.

== Nuncios ==
- Leopoldo Girelli (18 June 2011 – 13 September 2017)
- Piero Pioppo (19 March 2018 – 15 September 2025)
- Walter Erbi (1 July 2026 – present)
