= Apostolic Nunciature to Bosnia and Herzegovina =

Diplomatic Mission of the Holy See in Bosnia and Herzegovina

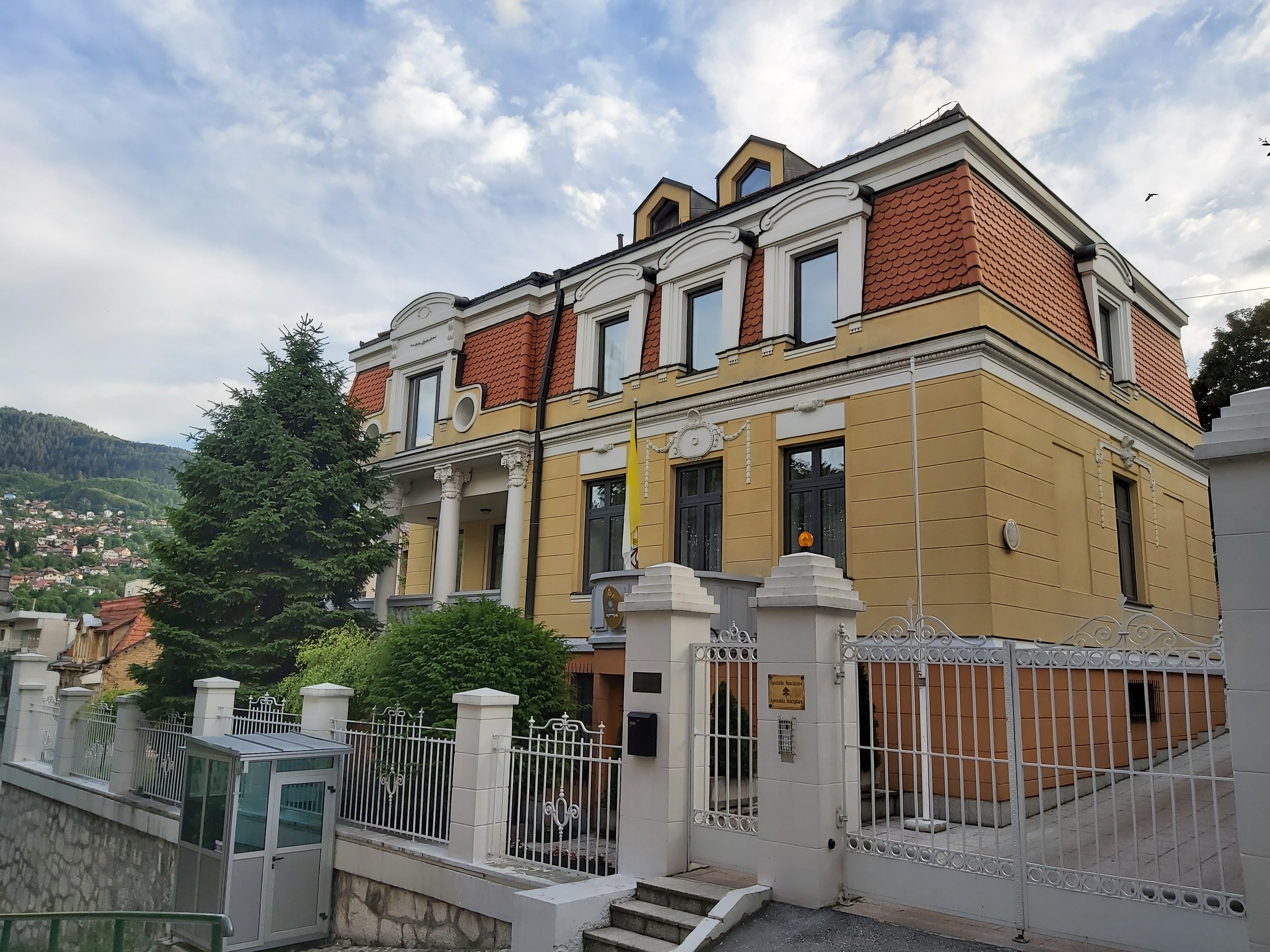
- The Apostolic Nunciature in Sarajevo
- Location: Sarajevo, Bosnia and Herzegovina
- Address: Pehlivanuša 9, Sarajevo 71000, Bosnia & Herzegovina
- Coordinates: 43°51′39.4″N 18°25′28.8″E
- Apostolic Nuncio: Francis Assisi Chullikatt

The Apostolic Nunciature to Bosnia and Herzegovina the diplomatic mission of the Holy See to Bosnia and Herzegovina. It is located in Sarajevo since 1993. The current Apostolic Nuncio to Bosnia and Herzegovina is Francis Assisi Chullikatt, who was appointed by Pope Francis on 1 October 2022.

The Apostolic Nunciature to Bosnia and Herzegovina is an ecclesiastical office of the Catholic Church in Bosnia and Herzegovina, with the rank of an embassy. The nuncio serves both as the ambassador of the Holy See to the President of Bosnia and Herzegovina, and as delegate and point-of-contact between the Catholic hierarchy in Bosnia and Herzegovina and the Pope.

The Apostolic Nuncio to Bosnia and Herzegovina is usually also the Apostolic Nuncio to Montenegro upon his appointment to said nation.

== Apostolic Nuncios to Bosnia and Herzegovina ==
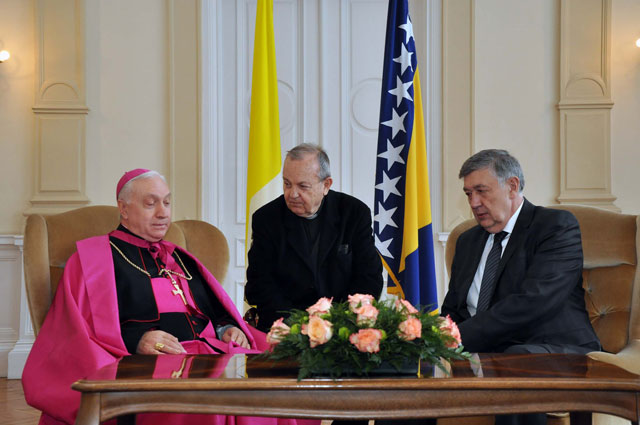
Meeting of the apostolic nuncio Luigi Pezzuto and Chairmen of the Presidency of Bosnia and Herzegovina Nebojša Radmanović

- Francesco Monterisi (11 June 1993 – 7 March 1998)
- Giuseppe Leanza (29 April 1999 – 22 February 2003)
- Santos Abril y Castelló (9 April 2003 – 21 November 2005)
- Alessandro D'Errico (21 November 2005 – 21 May 2012)
- Luigi Pezzuto (17 November 2012 – 31 August 2021)
- Francis Chullikatt (01 October 2022 – present)
