= Apostolic Nunciature to Nepal =

Diplomatic post of the Holy See

The Apostolic Nunciature to Nepal provides for the representation of the Holy See to the Government of Nepal. The nuncio resides in New Delhi, India.

The Holy See and Nepal established diplomatic relations on 10 September 1983. Pope John Paul II created the Apostolic Nunciature to Nepal on that day.

The title Apostolic Nuncio to Nepal is held by the prelate appointed Apostolic Nuncio to India; he resides in India.

== Papal representatives to Nepal ==
Pro-Nuncios

- Agostino Cacciavillan (30 April 1985 - 13 June 1990)
- Giorgio Zur (13 August 1990 – 7 December 1998)

Nuncios

- Lorenzo Baldisseri (23 June 1999 - 12 November 2002)
- Pedro López Quintana (8 February 2003 – 10 December 2009)
- Salvatore Pennacchio (13 November 2010 – 6 August 2016)
- Giambattista Diquattro (21 January 2017 – 29 August 2020)
- Leopoldo Girelli (13 September 2021 – 13 March 2026)
