= Giuseppe Lazzarotto =

Italian prelate

His Excellency, The Most Reverend Giuseppe Lazzarotto
- Apostolic Nuncio emeritus to Israel and Cyprus; Apostolic Delegate emeritus to Jerusalem and Palestine; Titular Archbishop of Numana
- Appointed: 18 August 2012
- Retired: 28 August 2017
- Predecessor: Antonio Franco
- Successor: Leopoldo Girelli
- Other post: Titular Archbishop of Numana
- Previous posts: Apostolic Nuncio to Australia (2007-2012); Apostolic Nuncio to Ireland (2000-2007); Apostolic Nuncio to Jordan and Iraq (1994-2000)

Orders
- Ordination: 1 April 1967 by Girolamo Bortignon
- Consecration: 7 October 1994 by Angelo Sodano, Myroslav Marusyn, and Antonio Mattiazzo

Personal details
- Born: May 24, 1942 (age 84) Carpanè, Vicenza, Italy

Styles of Giuseppe Lazzarotto
- Reference style: His Excellency; The Most Reverend
- Spoken style: Your Excellency
- Religious style: Archbishop

Giuseppe Lazzarotto KC*HS (born 24 May 1942) is an Italian prelate of the Catholic Church who worked in the diplomatic service of the Holy See from 1971 to 2017, with the rank of apostolic nuncio and an archbishop since 1994.

== Biography ==
Giuseppe Lazzarotto was born in Carpanè, Vicenza, Italy, on 24 May 1942. He studied for the priesthood and was ordained a priest of the Diocese of Padua on 1 April 1967. He completed the program of study at the Pontifical Ecclesiastical Academy in 1967 and earned a doctorate in canon law.

== Diplomatic career ==
He entered the diplomatic service of the Holy See in 1971.

Lazzarotto served as part of the delegations in Zambia and Malawi, Belgium, Cuba, and Jerusalem, and in the Section for Relations with States of the Secretariat of State of the Holy See from 1984 to 1994. He was appointed Apostolic Nuncio to the Hashemite Kingdom of Jordan and to Iraq on 23 July 1994 and appointed Titular Archbishop of Numana. He was consecrated bishop on 7 October 1994 by Cardinal Angelo Sodano assisted by Archbishop Miroslav Stefan Marusyn and Bishop Antonio Mattiazzo.

He was appointed Apostolic Nuncio to Ireland on 11 November 2000. He presented his credentials to President Mary McAleese on 18 January 2001.

In 2007 a questionnaire about prospective candidates for bishop that Lazzarotto had sent to priests in the Down and Connor Diocese became public. Lazzarotto refused to comment about it saying that "all aspects relating to the process of episcopal appointments should be dealt with in the strictest confidentiality. I trust that you will understand that I cannot depart from this practice".

On 22 December 2007, Pope Benedict XVI named him Apostolic Nuncio to Australia.

The Murphy Report into child abuse in the Dublin archdiocese, released in November 2009, criticized Lazzarotto for failing to respond to a request for documents. His refusal was part of an ongoing dispute between the Irish investigators and the Holy See. The Vatican insisted on communication through the Irish Ministry of Foreign Affairs, while the Commission viewed itself as independent of the government and not confined to diplomatic channels.

On 18 August 2012, Pope Benedict appointed him apostolic nuncio to Israel and apostolic delegate to Jerusalem and Palestine, to which he added the responsibilities of apostolic nuncio to Cyprus on 30 August.

He retired from the diplomatic service in August 2017. On 4 October, Pope Francis named him a member of the Congregation for the Evangelization of Peoples. At the end of 2017, he was appointed Assessor of the Order of the Holy Sepulchre by its Grand Master, Cardinal Edwin O'Brien. He resigned that position for health reasons in 2019.

== See also ==
- List of heads of the diplomatic missions of the Holy See

Diplomatic posts
Preceded by Marian Oleś	Apostolic Nuncio to Iraq; 23 July 1994 – 11 November 2000	Succeeded by Fernando Filoni
New title	Apostolic Nuncio to Jordan; 23 July 1994 – 11 November 2000	Succeeded by Fernando Filoni
Preceded by Luciano Storero	Apostolic Nuncio to Ireland; 11 November 2000 – 22 December 2007	Succeeded by Giuseppe Leanza
Preceded by Ambrose De Paoli	Apostolic Nuncio to Australia; 22 December 2007 – 18 August 2012	Succeeded by Paul Gallagher
Preceded by Antonio Franco	Apostolic Nuncio to Israel; 18 August 2012 – 28 August 2017	Succeeded by Leopoldo Girelli
Preceded by Antonio Franco	Apostolic Delegate to Jerusalem and Palestine; 18 August 2012 – 28 August 2017	Succeeded by Leopoldo Girelli
Preceded by Antonio Franco	Apostolic Nuncio to Cyprus; 30 August 2012 – 28 August 2017	Succeeded by Leopoldo Girelli
