= Apostolic Nunciature to Cyprus =

Diplomatic post of the Holy See

The Apostolic Nunciature to Cyprus is an ecclesiastical office of the Catholic Church in Cyprus. It is a diplomatic post of the Holy See, whose representative is called the Apostolic Nuncio with the rank of an ambassador. The title Apostolic Nuncio to Cyprus is held by the prelate appointed Apostolic Nuncio to Jordan; he resides in Jordan.

== List of papal representatives ==
Apostolic Pro-Nuncios

- Pio Laghi (28 May 1973 – 27 April 1974)
- William Aquin Carew (13 May 1974 – 30 August 1983)
- Carlo Curis (4 February 1984 – 28 March 1990)
- Andrea Cordero Lanza di Montezemolo (28 May 1990 – 7 March 1998)

Apostolic Nuncios

- Pietro Sambi (6 June 1998 – 17 December 2005)
- Antonio Franco (21 January 2006 – 18 August 2012)
- Giuseppe Lazzarotto (30 August 2012 – 28 August 2017)
- Leopoldo Girelli (15 September 2017 – 13 March 2021)
- Adolfo Tito Yllana (3 June 2021 – 17 February 2023)
- Giovanni Pietro Dal Toso (17 February 2023 – present)
