= Giambattista Diquattro =

Italian archbishop and Vatican diplomat

His Excellency, The Most Reverend Giambattista Diquattro
- Apostolic Nuncio to Brazil; Titular Archbishop of Giru Mons
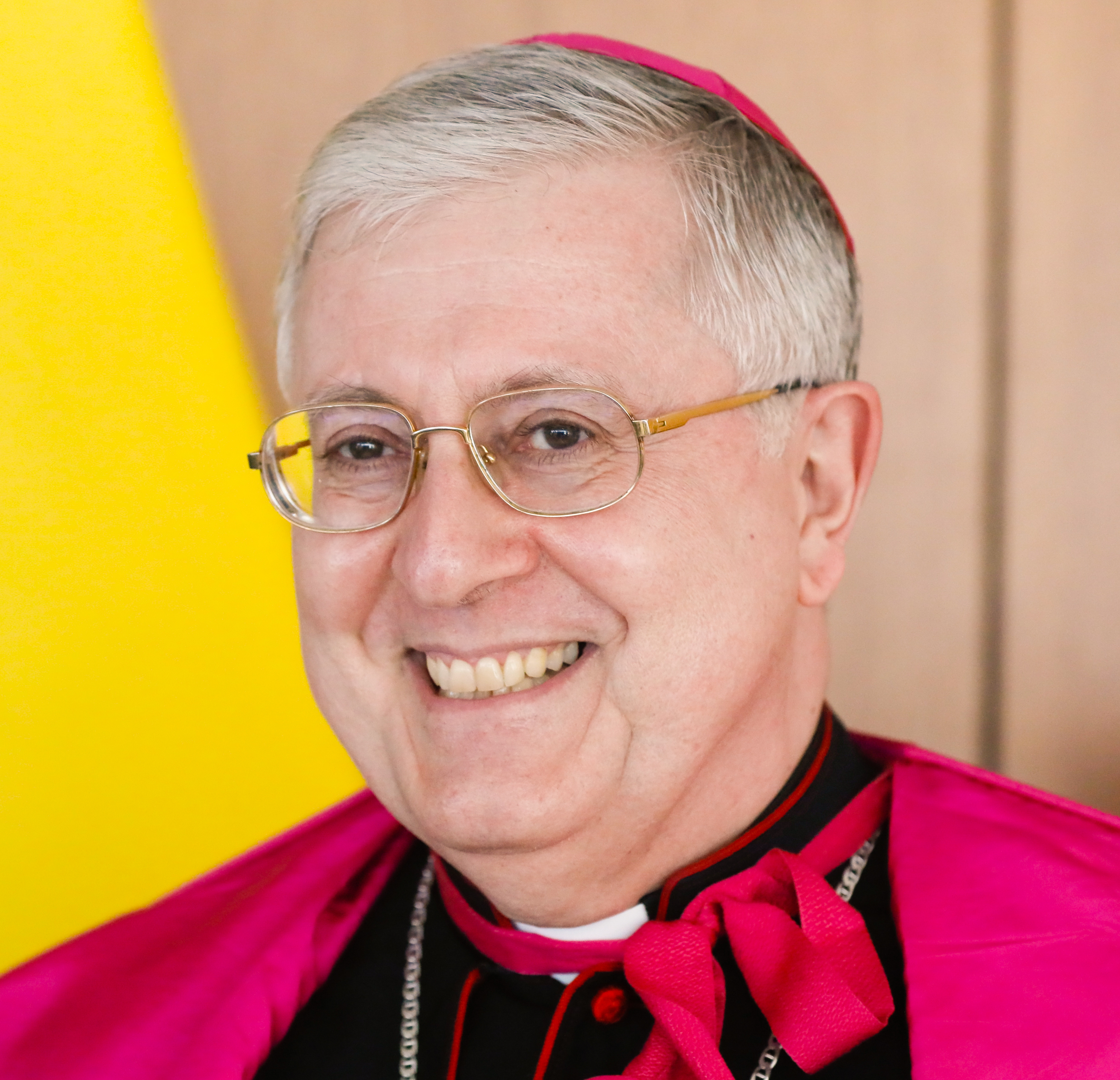
- Diquattro in 2021
- Appointed: 29 August 2020
- Predecessor: Giovanni d’Aniello
- Other post: Titular Archbishop of Giru Mons
- Previous posts: Apostolic Nuncio to India and Nepal (2017-2020); Apostolic Nuncio to Bolivia (2008-2017); Apostolic Nuncio to Panama (2005-2008)

Orders
- Ordination: 24 August 1981 by Angelo Rizzo
- Consecration: 4 June 2005 by Angelo Sodano

Personal details
- Born: March 18, 1954 (age 72) Bologna, Italy
- Motto: Nomen meum tene
- Coat of arms

Styles of Giambattista Diquattro
- Reference style: His Excellency; The Most Reverend
- Spoken style: Your Excellency
- Religious style: Archbishop

Giambattista Diquattro (born 18 March 1954) is an Italian archbishop and Vatican diplomat. He has been the Apostolic Nuncio (Papal Ambassador) to Brazil since 2020. He has worked in the diplomatic service of the Holy See since 1985 and has been a nuncio and archbishop since 2005.

== Biography ==
Diquattro was born on 18 March 1954 in Bologna and was ordained a priest for the diocese of Ragusa in 1981. He received his master's degree in civil law from the University of Catania, his Doctorate in Canon Law (JCD) from the Pontifical Lateran University in Rome, and his master's degree in dogmatic theology from the Pontifical Gregorian University in Rome.

== Diplomatic career ==
He joined the diplomatic service of the Holy See on 1 May 1985, and served in diplomatic missions in the pontifical representations to the Central African Republic, the Democratic Republic of Congo and Chad, the United Nations in New York, and later in the Vatican Secretariat of State, and in the Apostolic Nunciature in Italy.

Pope John Paul II appointed him apostolic nuncio to Panama on 2 April 2005.

Pope Benedict XVI appointed him apostolic nuncio to Bolivia on 21 November 2008.

On 21 January 2017, Pope Francis named him Apostolic Nuncio to India and Nepal.

On 29 August 2020, Pope Francis named him Apostolic Nuncio to Brazil.

== See also ==
- List of heads of the diplomatic missions of the Holy See

Diplomatic posts
Preceded by Salvatore Pennacchio	Apostolic Nuncio to India; 21 January 2017 – 29 August 2020	Succeeded by Leopoldo Girelli
Preceded by Luciano Suriani	Apostolic Nuncio to Bolivia; 21 November 2008 – 21 January 2017	Succeeded by Angelo Accattino
Preceded by Giacomo Guido Ottonello	Apostolic Nuncio to Panama; 2 April 2005 – 21 November 2008	Succeeded by Andrés Carrascosa Coso
