= Giorgio Lingua =

Italian Catholic bishop and diplomat

His Excellency, The Most Reverend Giorgio Lingua
- Apostolic Nuncio to Israel and Apostolic Delegate to Jerusalem and Palestine; Titular Archbishop of Tuscania
- Appointed: 22 January 2026
- Predecessor: Adolfo Tito Yllana
- Other post: Titular Archbishop of Tuscania
- Previous posts: Apostolic Nuncio to Croatia (2019–2026); Apostolic Nuncio to Cuba (2015–2019); Apostolic Nuncio to Iraq and Jordan (2010–2015)

Orders
- Ordination: 10 November 1984
- Consecration: 9 October 2010 by Tarcisio Bertone, Franc Rode and Agostino Vallini

Personal details
- Born: 23 March 1960 (age 66) Fossano, Italy
- Education: Pontifical Ecclesiastical Academy

Styles of Giorgio Lingua
- Reference style: His Excellency; The Most Reverend
- Spoken style: Your Excellency
- Religious style: Archbishop

Giorgio Lingua (born 23 March 1960) is an Italian prelate of the Catholic Church who has worked in the diplomatic service of the Holy See since 1992. He was previously nuncio in Iraq, Jordan, Cuba and Croatia.

== Biography ==
He was born on 23 March 1960 in Piovani, a small town belonging to the municipality of Fossano, in the province of Cuneo, Italy, in 1960. He was ordained on 10 November 1984. He earned a doctorate in canon law. To prepare for a diplomat’s career, he completed the course of study at the Pontifical Ecclesiastical Academy in 1988.

== Diplomatic career ==
He entered the diplomatic service of the Holy See on 1 July 1992. He worked in the papal representations in the Ivory Coast and the United States, and in the Section for Relations with States of the Secretariat of State as well as in the apostolic nunciatures in Italy and Serbia.

On 4 September 2010, Pope Benedict XVI named him the Apostolic Nuncio to Iraq and Jordan as well as Titular Archbishop of Tuscania. He received his episcopal consecration from Tarcisio Bertone on 9 October 2010.

Asked about the 2014 US airstrikes in response to the advance of ISIS, Lingua said: "This is something that had to be done, otherwise [the Islamic State] could not be stopped. But, we should wonder why we have arrived at this point: was it not a lack of intelligence? Were we not able to understand what was going on? And then: who gave these [Islamic State fighters] such sophisticated weapons?"

On 17 March 2015, Pope Francis named him Apostolic Nuncio to Cuba.

On 22 July 2019, Francis named him Apostolic Nuncio to Croatia.

On January 22, 2026, Pope Leo XIV named him as nuncio to Israel and Apostolic Delegate to Jerusalem and Palestine.

== See also ==
- List of heads of the diplomatic missions of the Holy See

Catholic Church titles
Preceded by Aníbal Nieto Guerra	— TITULAR — Archbishop of Tuscania; 2010–present	Incumbent
Diplomatic posts
Preceded by Francis Chullikatt	Apostolic Nuncio to Iraq; 4 September 2010 – 17 March 2015	Succeeded by Alberto Ortega Martín
Preceded by Francis Chullikatt	Apostolic Nuncio to Jordan; 4 September 2010 – 17 March 2015	Succeeded by Alberto Ortega Martín
Preceded by Bruno Musarò	Apostolic Nuncio to Cuba; 17 March 2015 – 22 July 2019	Succeeded by Giampiero Gloder
Preceded by Giuseppe Pinto	Apostolic Nuncio to Croatia; 22 July 2019 – 22 January 2026	Vacant
Preceded by Adolfo Tito Yllana	Apostolic Nuncio to Israel and Apostolic Delegate to Jerusalem and Palestine; 22 January 2026 – present	Incumbent
