= Apostolic Nunciature to Croatia =

Diplomatic post of the Holy See

- Location: Zagreb
- Apostolic Nuncio: Archbishop Giorgio Lingua

The Apostolic Nunciature to the Republic of Croatia is an ecclesiastical office of the Catholic Church in Croatia. It is a diplomatic post of the Holy See, whose representative is called the Apostolic Nuncio with the rank of an ambassador that enjoys some additional privileges. Diplomatic relations between the Holy See and Croatia were established on 8 February 1992 following Croatia's independence from SFR Yugoslavia.

== Apostolic Nuncios ==
- Giulio Einaudi (29 February 1992 – 4 August 2003)
- Francisco-Javier Lozano Sebastián (4 August 2003 – 10 December 2007)
- Mario Roberto Cassari (14 February 2008 – 10 March 2012)
- Alessandro D'Errico (21 May 2012 – 27 April 2017)
- Giuseppe Pinto (1 July 2017 – 6 April 2019)
- Giorgio Lingua (22 July 2019 – 22 January 2026)
- Leopoldo Girelli (13 March 2026 – present)

== See also ==
- Apostolic Nunciature to Yugoslavia
