= Basilica of the Holy Spirit, La Grita =

Coordinates: 8°08′12″N 71°59′10″W

Basilica of the Holy Spirit
- Basílica del Espíritu Santo
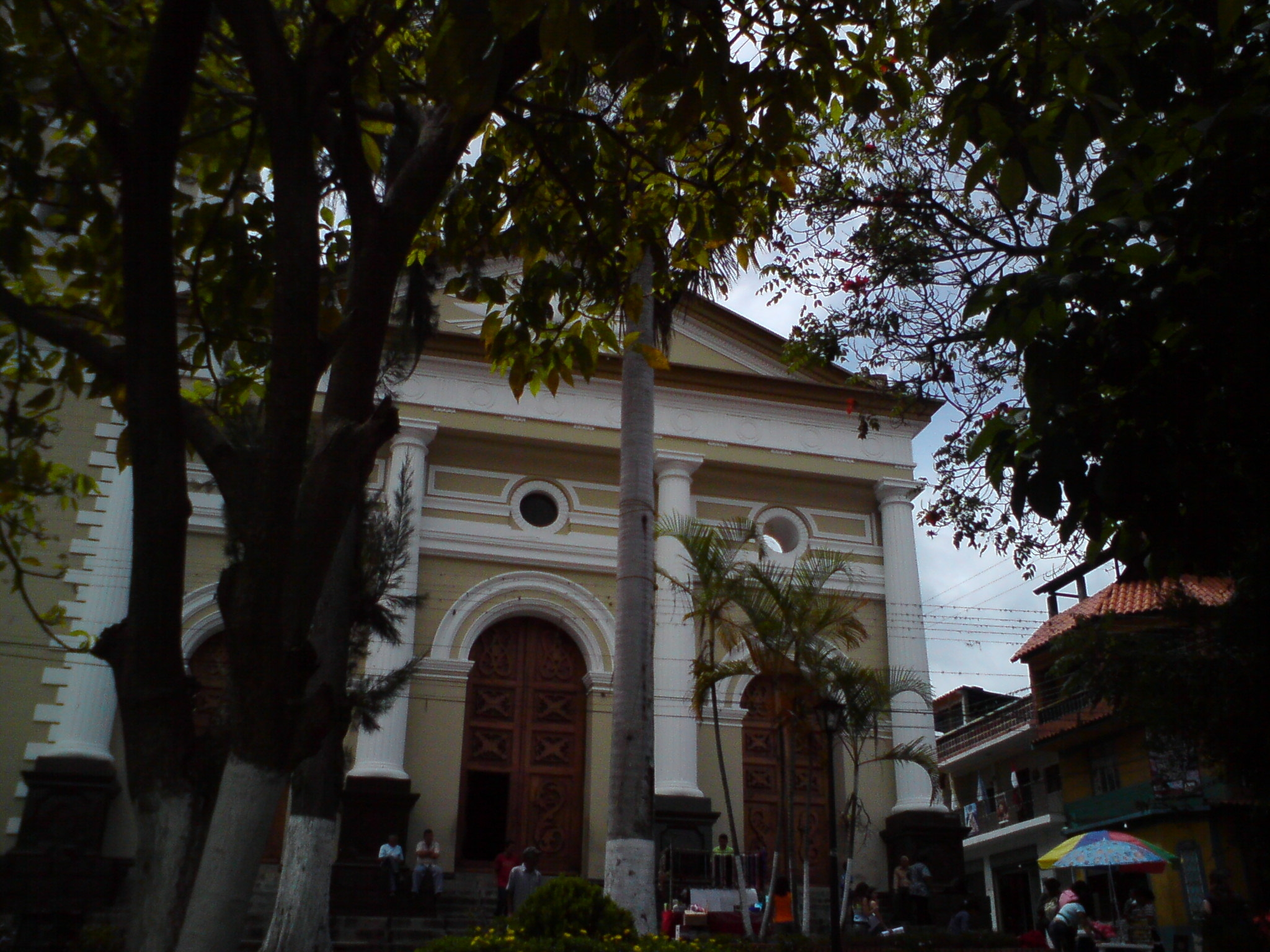
- Basilica of the Holy Spirit
- Location: La Grita
- Country: Venezuela
- Denomination: Roman Catholic Church

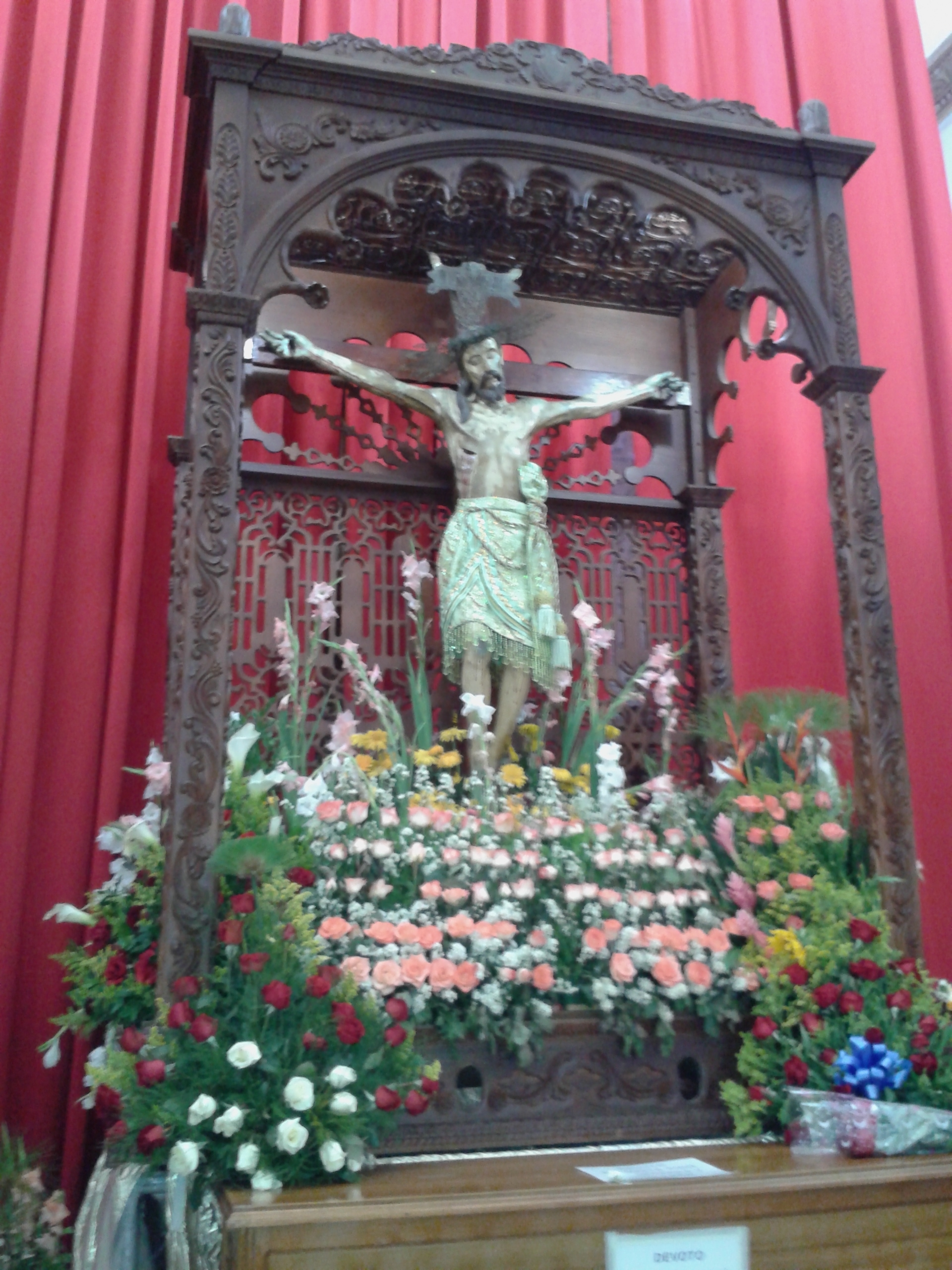
Internal view

The Basilica of the Holy Spirit (Spanish: Basílica del Espíritu Santo) AKA Basilica of La Grita is a Catholic church, constructed in 1886, with the status of a minor basilica. It is located in the Plaza Bolivar of La Grita, capital of Jáuregui in the Táchira state, in the Andes of the South American country of Venezuela. The Basilica of the Holy Spirit houses the sacred image of the Holy Christ of La Grita.

It has a rectangular floorplan with a tower that is completed with a dome half circle, with concrete walls, blocks of clay and cement. Its windows have varieties of stained glass, carved wooden doors and granite floors. The interior of the basilica has three naves and a dome on the altar, which is marble, its 20 Gothic columns divide the ships.

== See also ==
- Roman Catholicism in Venezuela
- Basilica of the National Shrine of Our Lady of Coromoto
