= Giru Mons =

Ancient Roman town

Roman Empire - Mauretania Caesariensis (125 AD).

Giru Mons is an ancient town of the Roman Empire and a titular bishopric of the Roman Catholic Church. The ancient town has been tentatively identified with ruins at Yerroum, northern Algeria.

Giru Mons (Latin: Diocesis Girumontensis) was the capital of a historic diocese in the Roman province of Mauretania Caesariensis, which ceased to function in the 7th century during the Islamic expansion, into northern Algeria. The only known ancient bishop of this diocese is Reparatus, who took part in the synod assembled in Carthage in 484 by King Huneric of the Vandal Kingdom, after which Reparatus was exiled. At present the Catholic bishops are titular.

== Known bishops ==
- Reparatus (fl.484)
- Donaldo Chávez Núñez Auxiliary Bishop in Managua (Nicaragua) February 15, 1966 – 1979
- Antony Selvanayagam Auxiliary Bishop in Kuala Lumpur (Malaysia) 6 March 1980 – 2 July 1983
- Stefan Moskwa Auxiliary Bishop in Przemyśl (Poland) 30 November 1983 – 18 October 2004
- Giambattista Diquattro Titular archbishop pro hac vice Apostolic Nuncio 2 April 2005
