= Antonio Franco (prelate) =

Italian Roman Catholic prelate (1937–2026)

The Most Reverend Antonio Franco
- Apostolic Nuncio to Israel; Cyprus; Apostolic Delegate to Jerusalem and Palestine; Titular Archbishop of Gallesium
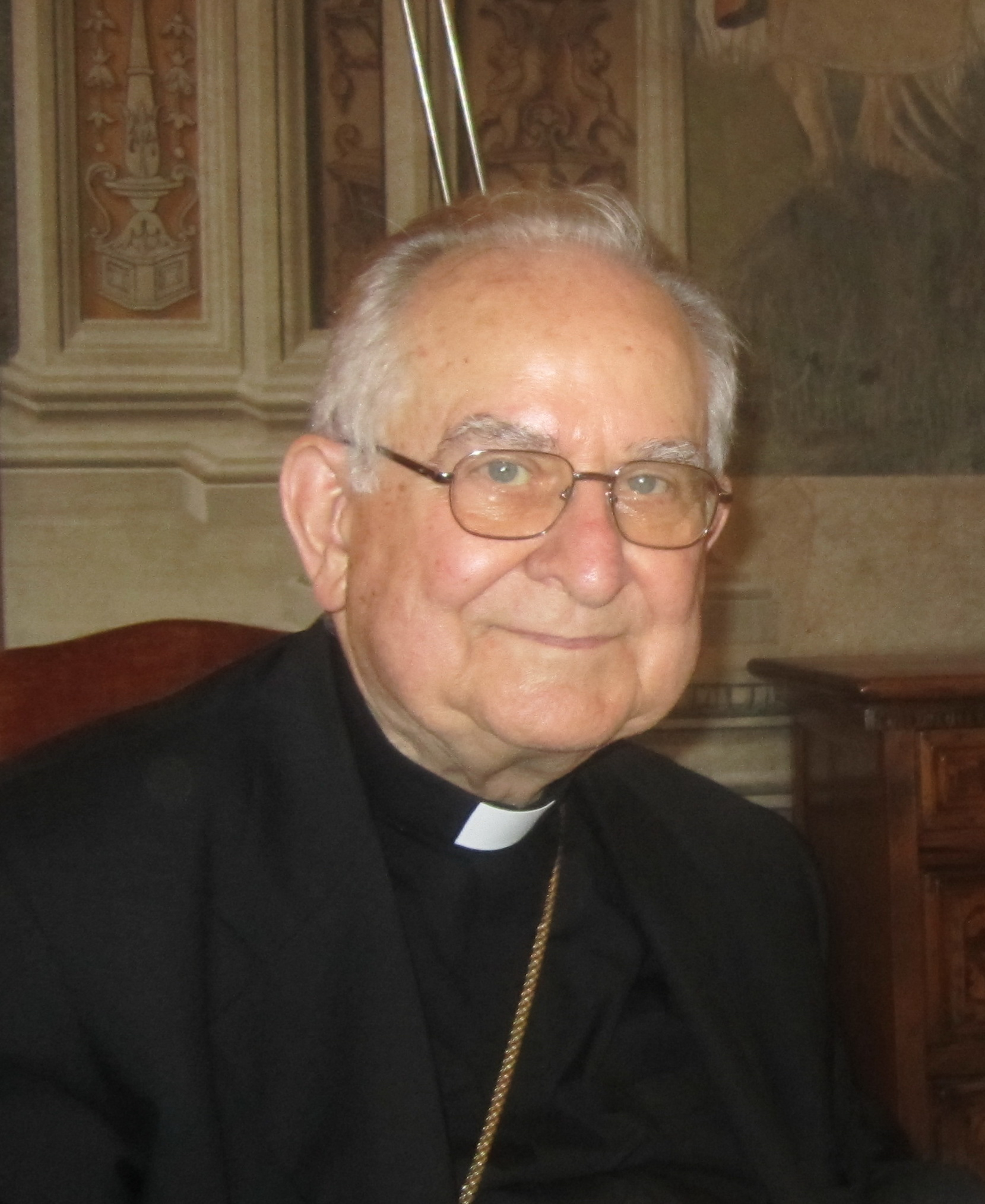
- Church: Catholic Church
- Appointed: 21 January 2006
- Retired: 18 August 2012
- Predecessor: Pietro Sambi
- Successor: Giuseppe Lazzarotto
- Other posts: Titular Archbishop of Gallesium; Assessor of the Order of the Holy Sepulchre
- Previous posts: Apostolic Nuncio to Philippines (1999–2006); Apostolic Administrator of Zakarpattia in Ukraine (1993–1997); Apostolic Nuncio to Ukraine (1992–1999)

Orders
- Ordination: 10 July 1960 by Felice Leonardo
- Consecration: 26 April 1992 by Pope John Paul II, Franciszek Macharski and Angelo Sodano

Personal details
- Born: 24 March 1937 Puglianello, Benevento, Kingdom of Italy
- Died: 15 November 2026 (aged 89) Benevento, Italy

Styles of Antonio Franco
- Reference style: His Excellency; The Most Reverend
- Spoken style: Your Excellency
- Religious style: Archbishop

Antonio Franco (24 March 1937 – 15 November 2026) was an Italian Roman Catholic prelate and Vatican diplomat.

== Early life ==
Antonio Franco was born in Puglianello, Kingdom of Italy, on 24 March 1937. He was ordained a priest of Telese o Cerreto Sannita on 10 July 1960.

== Diplomatic career ==
To prepare for a diplomatic career he entered the Pontifical Ecclesiastical Academy in 1968.

Franco held various posts in diplomatic missions of the Holy See in Iran, France, Permanent Mission of the Holy See to the United Nations in New York and the Section for Relations with States of the Secretariat of State.

He was appointed titular archbishop of Gallesium and apostolic nuncio to Ukraine on 28 March 1992. He received his episcopal consecration from Pope John Paul II on 26 April. From 1993 to 1997, while nuncio to Ukraine, he also served there as head of the new apostolic administration of Zakarpattia of Latini (later the Diocese of Mukacheve).

On 6 April 1999, he was appointed as apostolic nuncio to the Philippines.

On 21 January 2006, Pope Benedict XVI appointed him Apostolic Nuncio to Israel and Cyprus as well as Apostolic Delegate to Jerusalem and Palestine, In April 2007, Franco threatened to boycott a Holocaust memorial ceremony at Yad Vashem because of the way the museum described Pope Pius XII's behaviour toward the Jews during World War II. Franco relented, saying he only meant to draw attention to the question and calling the dispute "only diplomacy". The museum’s plaque describing Pope Pius' activities was later modified. Franco also helped manage Pope Benedict’s visit to the Holy Land in May 2008, and he fostered discussions between religious communities, the Holy See and the regions' governments.

Franco retired from the diplomatic service in August 2012 but remained responsible for the dossier for negotiations between the Holy See and Israel regarding fiscal concerns, taxes and church lands in Israel.

On 22 February 2013, he succeeded Archbishop Giuseppe De Andrea as the assessor of the Order of the Holy Sepulchre.

As late as 2017, he continued to serve as a member of the Holy See's delegation to the Bilateral Permanent Working Commission between the Holy See and the State of Israel.

== Death ==
Franco died on 15 November 2026, aged 89.

== See also ==
- List of heads of the diplomatic missions of the Holy See

Diplomatic posts
New title	Apostolic Nuncio to Ukraine; 1992–1999	Succeeded by Nikola Eterović
Preceded by Pietro Sambi	Apostolic Nuncio to Israel; Apostolic Nuncio to Cyprus; 2006–2012	Succeeded by Giuseppe Lazzarotto
Preceded by Gian Vincenzo Moreni	Apostolic Nuncio to the Philippines; 1999–2006	Succeeded by Fernando Filoni
Catholic Church titles
Preceded by Giuseppe De Andrea	Assessor of the Order of the Holy Sepulchre; 2013–2017	Succeeded by Giuseppe Lazzarotto
