= Squinzano =

Squinzano Schinzanu (Sicilian)
- Comune
- Comune di Squinzano
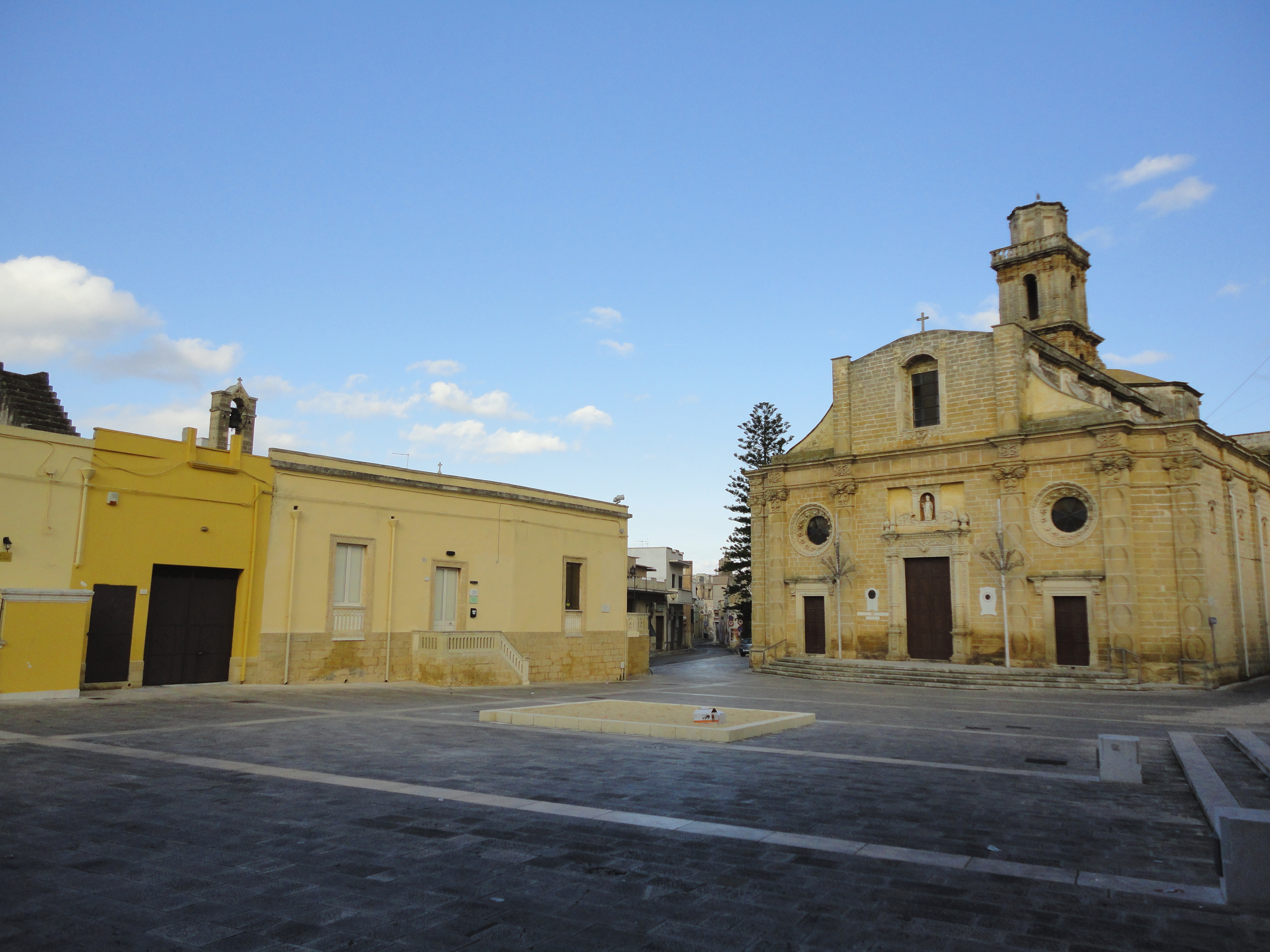

- Coat of arms

- Location within Italy Location within Apulia
- Coordinates: 40°26′N 18°3′E
- Country: Italy
- Region: Apulia
- Province: Lecce (LE)
- Frazioni: Casalabate

Government
  - Mayor: Giovanni Marra

Area
  - Total: 29.78 km^{2} (11.50 sq mi)
- Elevation: 48 m (157 ft)

Population (1 January 2017)
  - Total: 14,100
  - Density: 473/km^{2} (1,230/sq mi)
- Demonym: Squinzanesi
- Time zone: UTC+1 (CET)
  - Summer (DST): UTC+2 (CEST)
- Postal code: 73018
- Dialing code: 0832
- Patron saint: St. Nicholas of Bari
- Website: Official website

Squinzano (Salentino: Schinzanu) is a town and comune (municipality) in the province of Lecce in the Apulia region of south-east Italy. It is the twelfth-most populous city in the province of Lecce.

Squinzano is also a specific area within the Apulian wine region. Squinzano DOC is produced in red and rosé versions, and is chiefly obtained from the Negroamaro grape, with a small addition of Malvasia Nera di Brindisi and Malvasia Nera di Lecce.
