= Rosalio José Castillo Lara =

His Eminence Rosalio José Castillo Lara SDB
- President of the Pontifical Commission for Vatican City State; President of the Governorate of Vatican City State
- Church: Roman Catholic Church
- Appointed: 31 October 1990
- Term ended: 14 October 1997
- Predecessor: Sebastiano Baggio
- Successor: Edmund Szoka
- Other post: Cardinal-Priest of Nostra Signora di Coromoto in San Giovanni di Dio "pro hac vice" (1996–2007)
- Previous posts: Coadjutor Bishop of Trujillo (1973–81); Titular Bishop of Praecausa (1973–82); Secretary of the Pontifical Commission for the Revision of the Code of Canon Law (1975–82); President of the Disciplinary Commission of the Roman Curia (1981–90); Pro-President of the Pontifical Commission for the Authentic Interpretation of the Code of Canon Law (1982–85); Titular Archbishop of Praecausa (1982–85); Cardinal-Deacon of Nostra Signora di Coromoto in San Giovanni di Dio (1985–96); President of the Pontifical Council for the Interpretation of Legislative Texts (1985–89); President of the Administration of the Patrimony of the Apostolic See (1989–95)

Orders
- Ordination: 4 September 1949 by Lucas Guillermo Castillo Hernández
- Consecration: 24 May 1973 by José Humberto Quintero Parra
- Created cardinal: 24 May 1985 by Pope John Paul II
- Rank: Cardinal-Deacon (1985–96); Cardinal-Priest (1996–2007)

Personal details
- Born: Rosalio José Castillo Lara; 4 September 1922 San Casimiro, Aragua State, Venezuela
- Died: 16 October 2007 (aged 85) Caracas, Venezuela
- Parents: Rosalio Castillo Hernández; Guillermina Lara Peña
- Education: Universidad Salesiana de Turín; University of Bonn
- Motto: Misericordia et veritas
- Coat of arms

Rosalio José Castillo Lara SDB (4 September 1922 – 16 October 2007) was a Venezuelan prelate of the Catholic Church. He worked in the Roman Curia for almost all of his career, first with responsibility for rewriting the code of canon law and then in administrative positions in the government of the Holy See. He was made a cardinal in 1985.

== Biography ==
Castillo Lara was born in San Casimiro, diocese of Maracay, in Venezuela's Aragua State, on 4 September 1922. Third son of seven children, he was ordained a priest on 4 September 1949, by his uncle, Archbishop Castillo Hernandez of Caracas.

In 1950 he went to study canon law at the Salesian Pontifical University in Turin. In September 1954, he was named professor at the faculty of canon law, at first in Turin until 1957, then in Rome until 1965. He was named titular bishop of Precausa and Coadjutor Bishop of Trujillo on 26 March 1973.

He became Secretary of the Commission for the Revision of the Code of Canon Law on 20 February 1975. In 1982 he was named President of the Commission for the Revision of the Code of Canon Law, which produced the 1983 Code of Canon Law. He was promoted to archbishop on 26 May 1982.

He was named Pro-President of the Pontifical Commission for the Authentic Interpretation of the Code of Canon Law on 18 January 1984. Pope John Paul II made him a cardinal during the Consistory of 25 May 1985, and two days later appointed him the first President of the Pontifical Commission for the Authentic Interpretation of the Code of Canon Law, later known as the Pontifical Council for Legislative Texts.

He became President of the Administration of the Patrimony of the Holy See on 6 December 1989, a post to which he added on 31 October 1990 that of President of the Pontifical Commission for the State of Vatican City. He was also a member of several other bodies, including the Cardinals' Supervisory Commission for the Institute for Religious Works, commonly known as the Vatican Bank.

In 1996, he dismissed concerns about the health of Pope John Paul II, who was suffering from Parkinson's disease. He said: "Certainly the tremor in the hand is terrible, and I think that for the Pope, who was once such an athlete, it is a humiliating and mortifying phenomenon. But it helps to maintain a spirit of humility, and still, he is lucid, with a remarkable memory."

=== Relations with the Chávez government ===
Castillo Lara was one of the Venezuelan ecclesiastic figures most opposed to the government of Hugo Chávez. In a 2006 homily, he asked for prayers "with fervour to the Virgin Mary to save Venezuela. We are living a very grave situation, like a few times in our history". Castillo once called Chávez "a paranoid dictator", while Chavez called Castillo "a hypocrite, bandit and devil with a cassock."

Catholic Church titles
Preceded by Agnelo Rossi	President of the Administration of the Patrimony of the Apostolic See; 6 December 1989 – 24 June 1995	Succeeded by Jose Tomas Sanchez
Preceded by Sebastiano Baggio	President of the Pontifical Commission for Vatican City State; 31 October 1990 – 14 October 1997	Succeeded by Edmund Szoka
