= Turris in Proconsulari =

Turris in Proconsulari is an ancient settlement of Roman North Africa in the Roman province of Africa Proconsularis. The location is unknown but believed to be in the territory of Henchir-Mest, northern Tunisia.

The city was also the seat of an ancient bishopric. Very little is known of the diocese, as neither the location of the cathedra nor any bishops' names have come to us. The name may derive from Turris Turris Annibalis, suffragan of Carthage, though this is conjecture at this time. The suffix "in pro consulari" is to differentiate the homonymous city that existed in Spain .

The diocese remains today a titular see of the Roman Catholic Church in the ecclesiastical province of Carthage.
