= Guanare =

- City
- Guanare
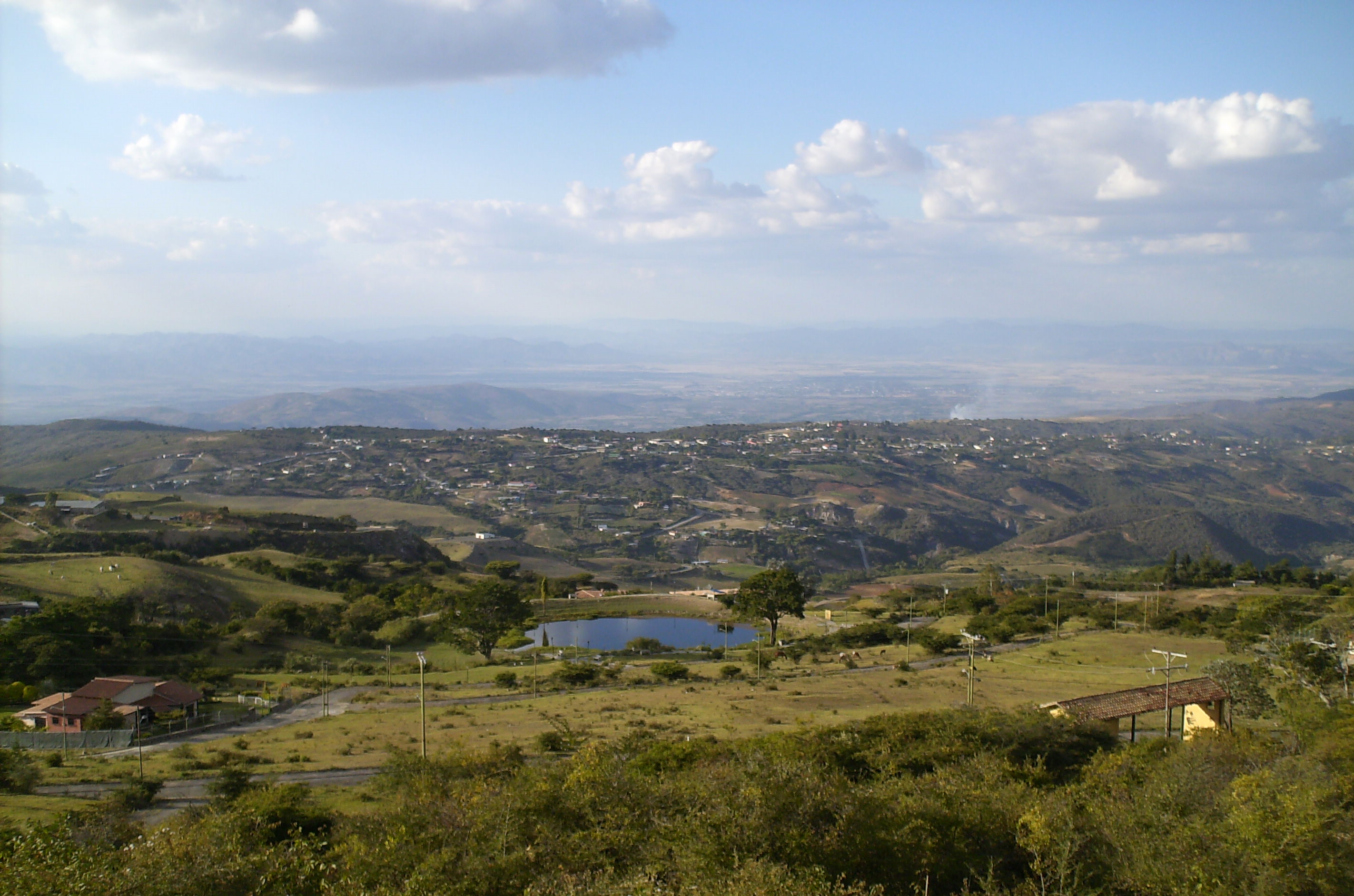
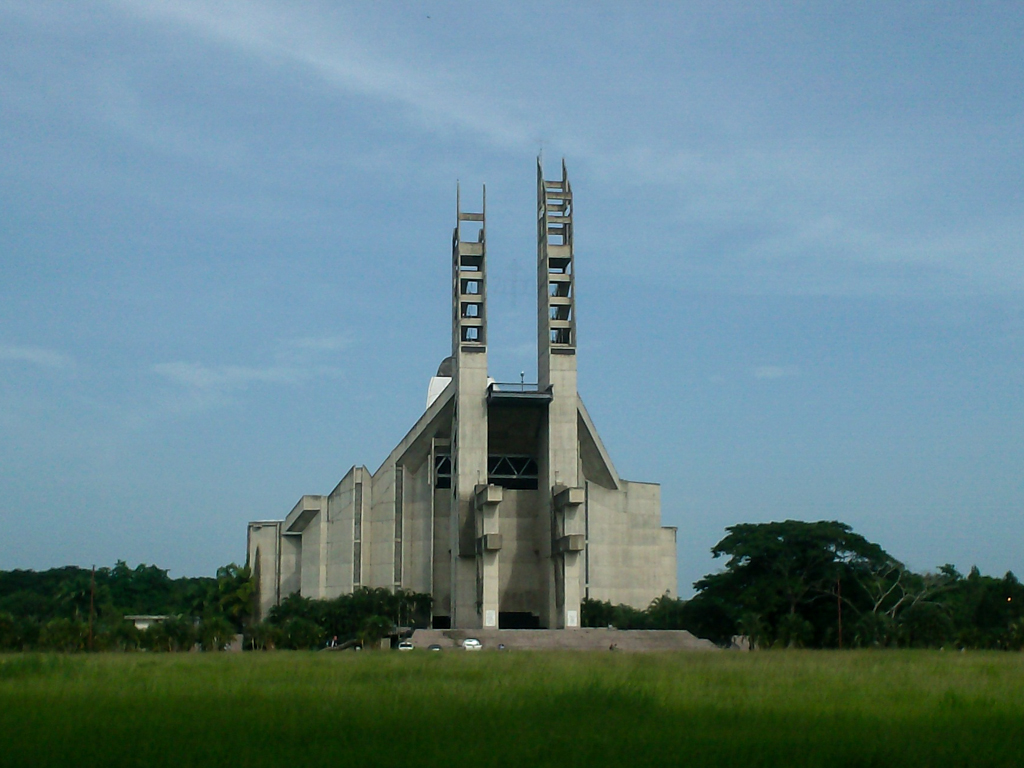
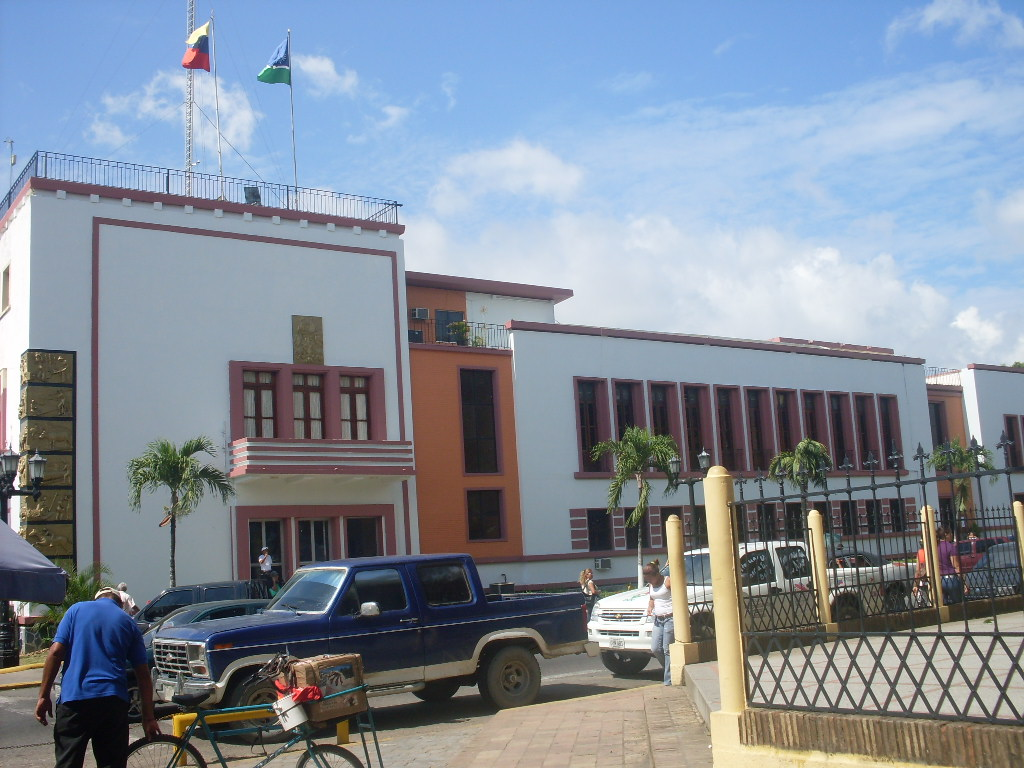
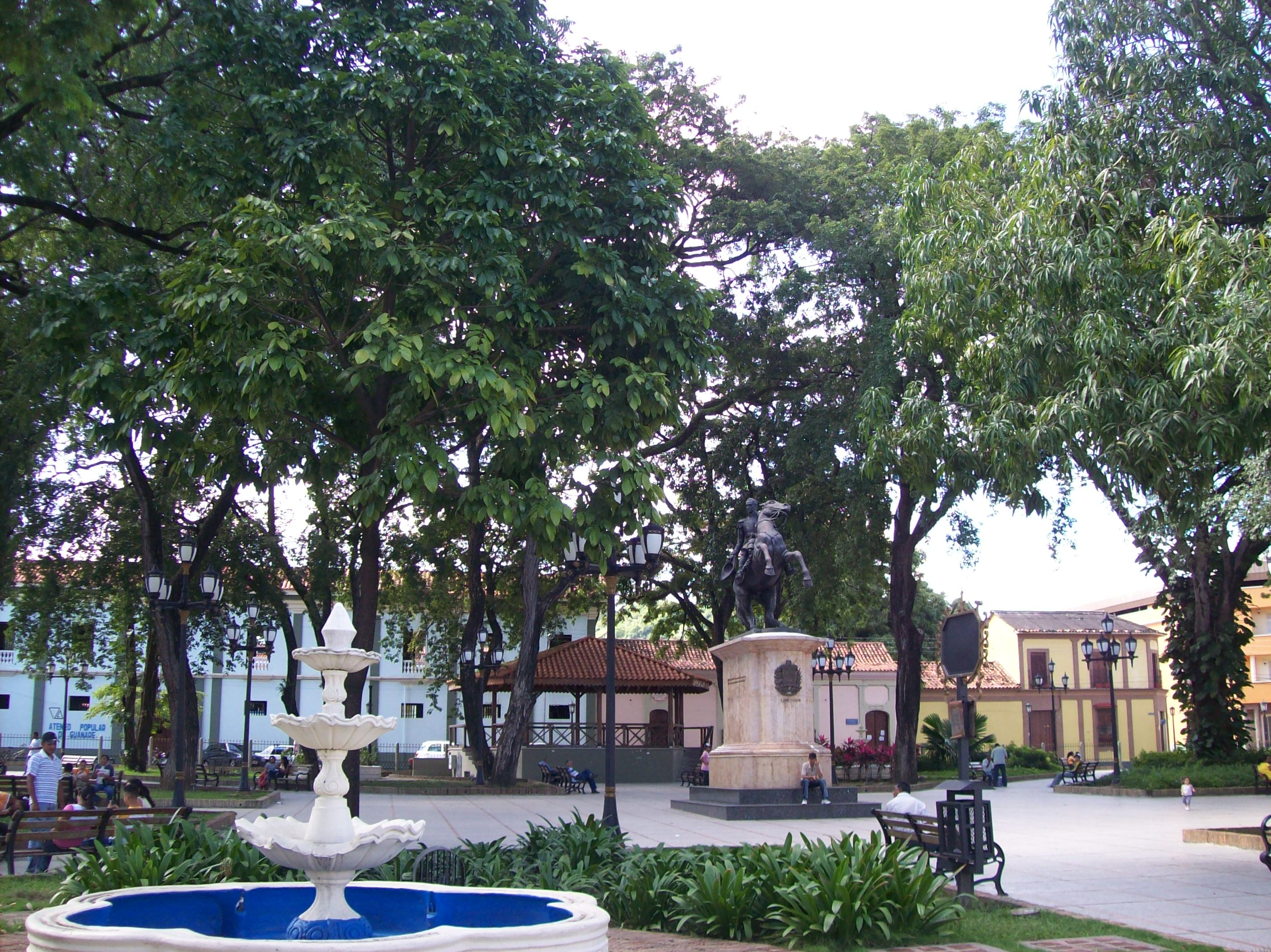
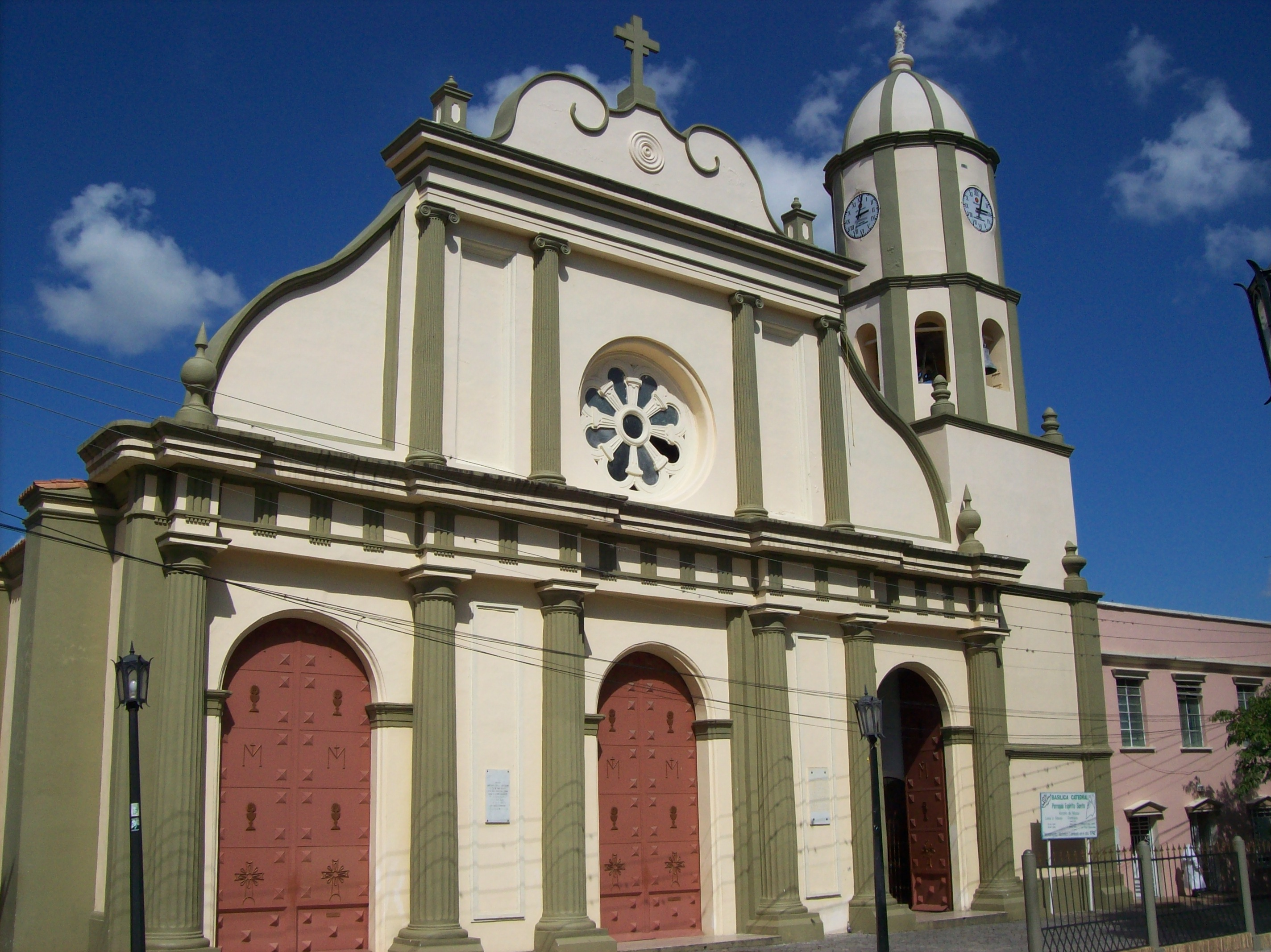
- From left to right: Way to Guanare, Sanctuary to the Virgin of Coromoto, Government Building of Portuguesa, Plaza Bolívar and Cathedral of Our Lady of Coromoto

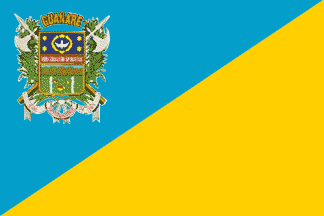
- Flag

- Location within Venezuela
- Coordinates: 9°02′37″N 69°44′56″W
- Country: Venezuela
- State: (Portuguesa (Venezuela)) Portuguesa
- Founded: 3 November 1591

Area
  - Total: 2,008 km^{2} (775 sq mi)
- Elevation: 183 m (600 ft)

Population (2022)
  - Total: 112,286
  - Density: 55.92/km^{2} (144.8/sq mi)
  - Demonym: Guanareño(a)
- Time zone: UTC−4 (VET)
- Postal code: 3350
- Area code: 0257
- Climate: Aw
- Website: Alcaldía de Guanare (in Spanish)
- The area and population figures are for the municipality

Guanare (Spanish pronunciation: [ɡwaˈnaɾe]) is the capital of Portuguesa State, Venezuela. It is where la Virgen de Coromoto is said to have appeared to a Coromoto Indian.

Guanare was founded on 3 November 1591 by João Fernandes de Leão Pacheco (1543–1593), a Portuguese captain from Portimão.

Located at the edge of the Southwestern floodplains, near the Andes foothills, Guanare is in a region known for livestock and agricultural production. Guanare is also the location of one of the campuses of UNELLEZ

== Notable people ==
- Javier Bertucci, philanthropist and businessman
- Ivian Sarcos, Miss World 2011
- Martín Pérez, baseball player
- Ernesto Mejía (Baseballer)

== Geography ==
=== Climate ===
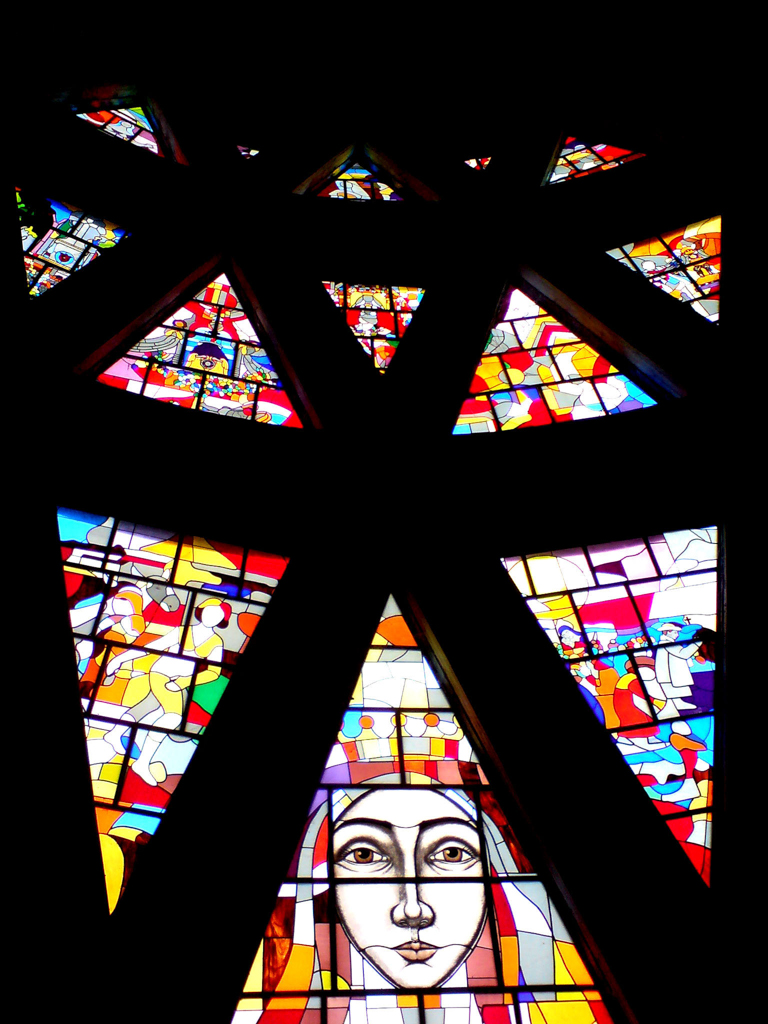
Nuestra Señora de Coromoto National Shrine

Climate data for Guanare (1991–2020, extremes 1971–2020)
Month	Jan	Feb	Mar	Apr	May	Jun	Jul	Aug	Sep	Oct	Nov	Dec	Year
Record high °C (°F)	37.7 (99.9)	38.5 (101.3)	38.5 (101.3)	37.9 (100.2)	38.8 (101.8)	35.0 (95.0)	38.2 (100.8)	34.7 (94.5)	35.2 (95.4)	35.4 (95.7)	35.3 (95.5)	35.9 (96.6)	38.8 (101.8)
Mean daily maximum °C (°F)	33.6 (92.5)	34.6 (94.3)	35.0 (95.0)	33.8 (92.8)	32.3 (90.1)	31.0 (87.8)	30.9 (87.6)	31.3 (88.3)	31.9 (89.4)	32.2 (90.0)	32.3 (90.1)	33.0 (91.4)	32.7 (90.9)
Daily mean °C (°F)	26.7 (80.1)	28.0 (82.4)	28.8 (83.8)	28.4 (83.1)	27.4 (81.3)	26.2 (79.2)	25.8 (78.4)	26.0 (78.8)	26.5 (79.7)	26.7 (80.1)	26.7 (80.1)	26.6 (79.9)	27.0 (80.6)
Mean daily minimum °C (°F)	21.0 (69.8)	22.0 (71.6)	23.4 (74.1)	24.0 (75.2)	23.7 (74.7)	22.9 (73.2)	22.4 (72.3)	22.5 (72.5)	22.7 (72.9)	22.8 (73.0)	22.7 (72.9)	21.5 (70.7)	22.6 (72.7)
Record low °C (°F)	15.4 (59.7)	15.4 (59.7)	17.5 (63.5)	18.3 (64.9)	19.4 (66.9)	17.2 (63.0)	17.9 (64.2)	17.7 (63.9)	18.7 (65.7)	18.6 (65.5)	17.9 (64.2)	9.4 (48.9)	9.4 (48.9)
Average rainfall mm (inches)	10.7 (0.42)	15.0 (0.59)	37.4 (1.47)	126.6 (4.98)	208.9 (8.22)	264.3 (10.41)	220.2 (8.67)	215.3 (8.48)	188.4 (7.42)	180.1 (7.09)	92.2 (3.63)	29.1 (1.15)	1,588.2 (62.53)
Average rainy days (≥ 1.0 mm)	1.5	1.9	3.9	9.4	14.7	17.2	16.9	15.1	13.3	12.6	8.2	3.9	118.6
Average relative humidity (%)	67.5	64.5	64.0	69.5	76.0	78.5	78.5	78.0	77.5	76.5	76.0	72.5	73.3
Mean monthly sunshine hours	257.3	221.2	207.7	141.0	145.7	138.0	167.4	186.0	195.0	207.7	219.0	232.5	2,318.5
Mean daily sunshine hours	8.3	7.9	6.7	4.7	4.7	4.6	5.4	6.0	6.5	6.7	7.3	7.5	6.4
Source 1: NOAA (sun 1971–1990)
Source 2: Instituto Nacional de Meteorología e Hidrología (humidity 1970–1998)
