= Our Lady of Coromoto =

Marian apparition

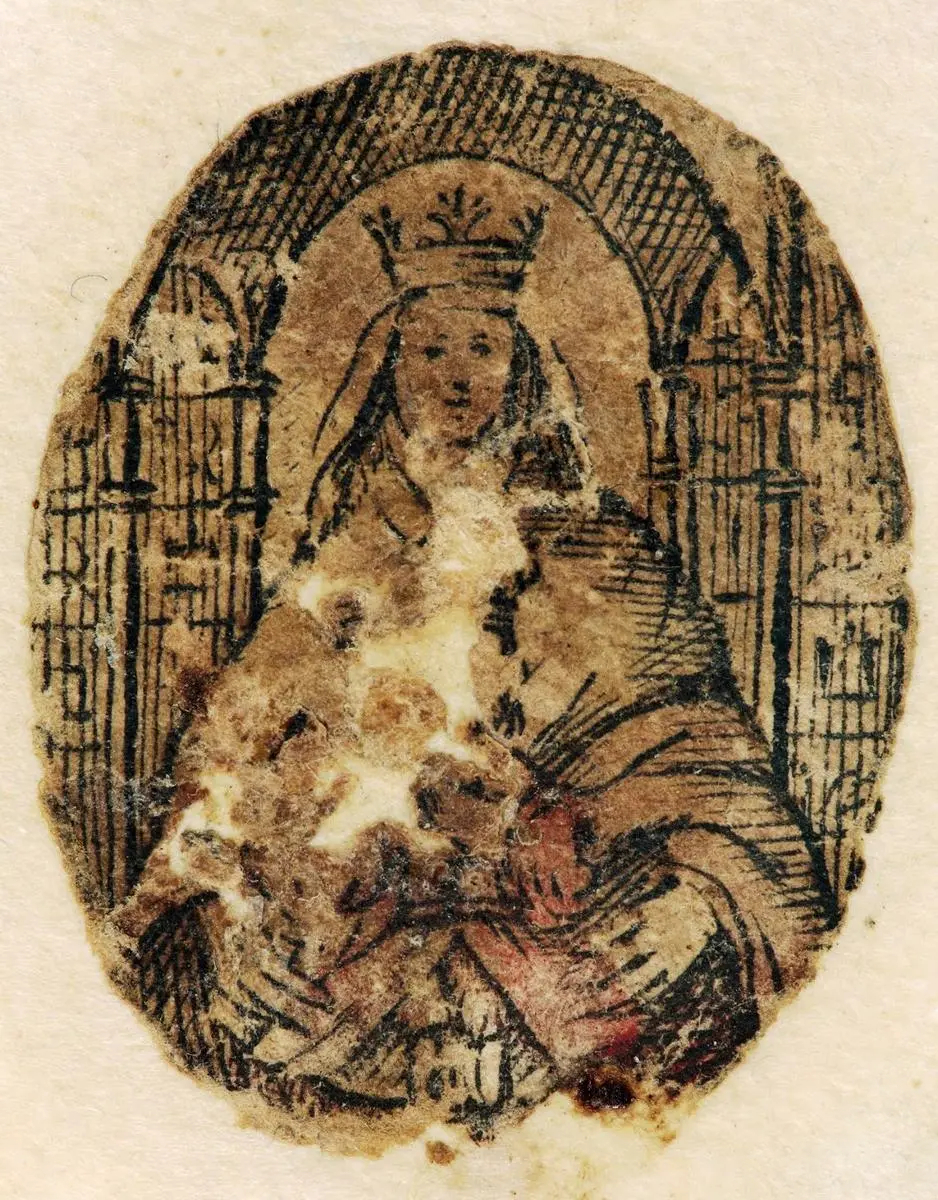
- The Virgin Mary's alleged apparition to Chief Coromoto
- Location: Guanare, Portuguesa, Venezuela
- Date: 8 September 1652
- Witness: Coromoto (Angel Custodio)
- Type: Marian apparition
- Approval: 1950, pontificate of Pope Pius XII
- Shrine: Basilica of Our Lady of Coromoto, Guanare, Venezuela.
- Patronage: Venezuela

Our Lady of Coromoto (Spanish: Nuestra Señora de Coromoto), also known as the Virgin of Coromoto (Spanish: Virgen de Coromoto), is a celebrated Catholic image of an alleged apparition of Mary, mother of Jesus. In 1942, she was declared the patron saint of Venezuela.

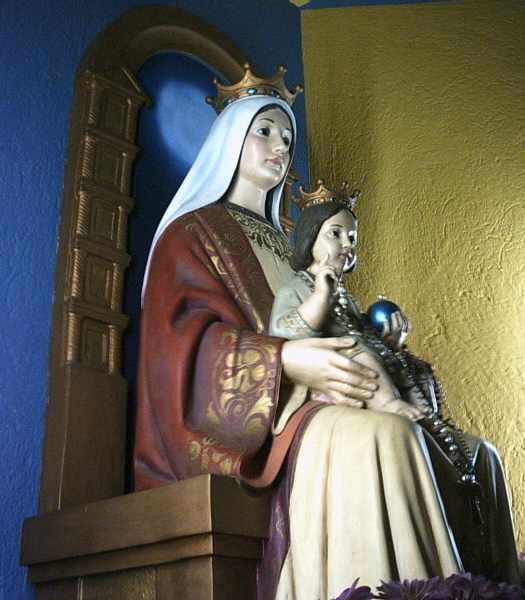
Statue of the Virgin of Coromoto in Guanare.

== Apparition ==
When the city of Guanare (capital of Portuguesa state) was founded in 1591, the Indian tribe who inhabited the region, the Cospes, fled to the northern jungle. When the Roman Catholic Church began to evangelize, its efforts were at first resisted. There is a legend that the Virgin Mary appeared twice to the chief of the local tribe, once in 1651 in a river canyon when she told him to be baptised, and again, when he was still refusing baptism, on September 8, 1652, when she appeared in his hut. This time he is said to have tried to grab her and she vanished, leaving behind a small painting of her.

== Veneration ==
The Venezuelan episcopate declared the Patroness of Venezuela on May 1, 1942, a designation ratified by Pope Pius XII on October 7, 1944, who then crowned her on September 11, 1952. Pope John Paul II reiterated an imposed solemn coronation of the Papal decree via Cardinal Agostino Casaroli on February 10, 1985. A church dedicated to her in Guanare was designated a national shrine on January 7, 1996. In 2007, Pope Benedict XVI elevated the church to the rank of a minor basilica, designated the Basilica of the National Shrine of Our Lady of Coromoto.
