= Fernando Filoni =

Italian cardinal (born 1946)

His Eminence Fernando Filoni
- Grand Master of the Order of the Holy Sepulchre
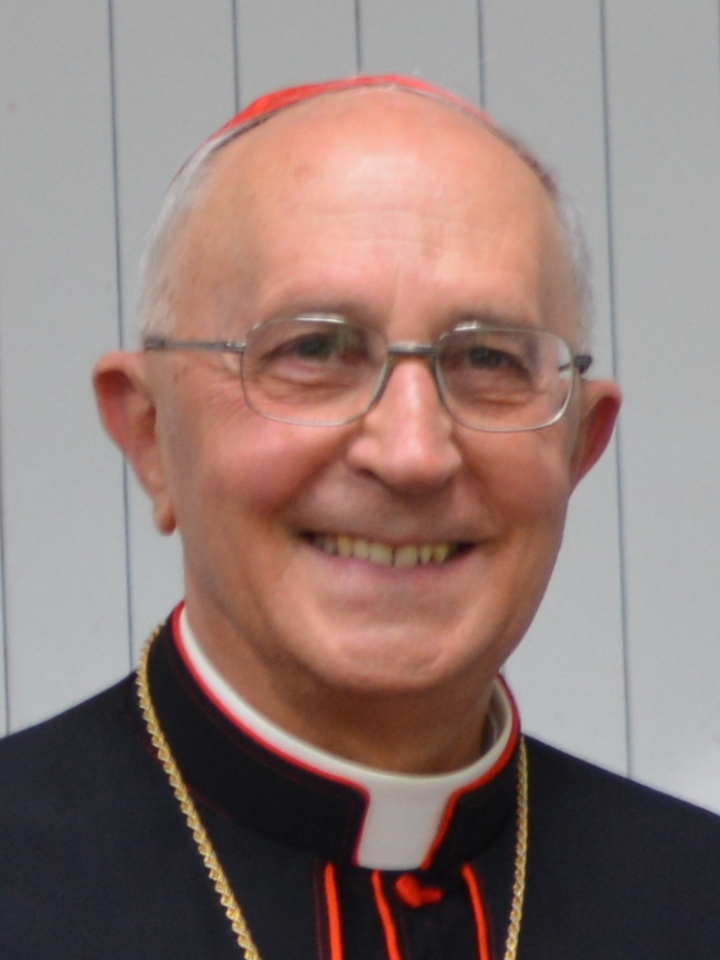
- Filoni in 2019
- Church: Catholic Church
- Appointed: 8 December 2019
- Installed: 16 January 2020
- Predecessor: Edwin Frederick O’Brien
- Other post: Cardinal-Bishop of Nostra Signora di Coromoto in San Giovanni di Dio (2018–)
- Previous posts: Titular Archbishop of Volturnum (2001–12); Apostolic Nuncio to Iraq (2001–06); Apostolic Nuncio to Jordan (2001–06); Apostolic Nuncio to Philippines (2006–07); Substitute of the Secretariat of State (2007–11); Cardinal-Deacon of Nostra Signora di Coronato in San Giovanni di Dio (2012–18); Prefect of the Congregation for the Evangelization of Peoples (2011–19)

Orders
- Ordination: 3 July 1970 by Antonio Rosario Mennonna
- Consecration: 19 March 2001 by Pope John Paul II
- Created cardinal: 18 February 2012 by Pope Benedict XVI
- Rank: Cardinal-Bishop

Personal details
- Born: Fernando Filoni; 15 April 1946 (age 80) Manduria, Italy
- Denomination: Catholic
- Residence: Vatican City
- Education: Pontifical Lateran University
- Motto: Lumen Gentium Christus; ("Christ, Light of the nations")

- Coat of arms

Styles of Fernando Filoni
- Reference style: His Eminence
- Spoken style: Your Eminence
- Informal style: Cardinal

Fernando Filoni (born 15 April 1946) is an Italian cardinal of the Catholic Church who serves as Grand Master of the Equestrian Order of the Holy Sepulchre. He was Prefect of the Congregation for the Evangelization of Peoples from 2011 to 2019. He is an expert in Chinese affairs and on the Middle East.

== Education and early diplomatic work ==
Filoni was born in Manduria near Taranto, Italy. He entered the seminary and earned doctorates in philosophy and in canon law from the Pontifical Lateran University. He was ordained a priest on 3 July 1970. He served in the nunciatures of Sri Lanka from 1981 until 1983, Iran from 1983 to 1985, Brazil from 1989 to 1992 and the Philippines from 1992 until 2000. Although formally assigned to the Apostolic Nunciature to the Philippines, he was based in Hong Kong. During this time Filoni was Pope John Paul II's bridge to China's bishops, official and non-official Churches and bishops, in the hope of reconciling them to the Holy See.

== Apostolic Nuncio ==
Pope John Paul II appointed Filoni as apostolic nuncio to Iraq and Jordan on 17 January 2001, naming him titular Archbishop of Volturnum. He received episcopal consecration from Pope John Paul II on 19 March 2001. He chose Lumen Gentium Christus as his episcopal motto.

Filoni defended the freedom of the Catholic Church in Iraq under the regime of Saddam Hussein and – in line with the Pope's position – opposed the US invasion of the country in 2003. He remained in Baghdad as American bombs fell, which he called "nothing exceptional". When Mario Vargas Llosa visited him in Baghdad in 2003, he described Filoni as "small, astute, tough as nails, talkative and an expert on emergencies", who described sadly how, just as predicted, it was "incredibly difficult to administer the peace". After the fall of Saddam he recognized the new-found freedom enjoyed by the people, but he warned against the lack of security and the slow development of the economy. He expressed mixed feelings towards the new constitution, which he described as both a "positive step towards normalization in the country" and "contradictory in some areas", and supported the peaceful coexistence between Christians and Muslims.

He came close to being killed in Baghdad on 1 February 2006, when a car bomb exploded next to the nunciature. He served in Iraq and Jordan until 25 February 2006 when he was named Apostolic Nuncio to the Philippines.

== Roman Curia ==
=== Substitute of the Secretariat of State ===
Pope Benedict XVI appointed Archbishop Filoni Substitute for General Affairs on 9 June 2007, effective 1 July. During his four years as Substitute, it was Filoni's job to organise the activities of the Curia and the care of official translations of papal documents and correspondence; encryption dispatches messengers to be sent to the Registry of the papal letters, the resolution of legal issues, personnel management in the Curia and nunciatures, protocol and etiquette for visiting heads of state, information and media management, and Vatican archive management. He was also responsible for organizing the activities of nuncios around the world in their activities concerning the local churches.

Observers noted that during his time as substitute, Filoni never established a strong rapport with his immediate superior, Secretary of State Tarcisio Bertone.

In 2008, Archbishop Filoni was awarded the Knight Grand Cross of the Order of Merit of the Italian Republic.

==== McCarrick Scandal ====
In his August 2018 "Testimony", Archbishop Carlo Maria Viganò wrote that on 25 May 2008 he had sent Filoni, then Substitute of the Secretariat of State, a summary of information provided by an ex-priest named Gregory Littleton who attested to sexual abuse of priests and seminarians by Cardinal Theodore McCarrick along with the information included in Richard Sipe's recently published "Statement for Pope Benedict XVI" on McCarrick's sexual misconduct. He said that Filoni "knew in every detail the situation regarding Cardinal McCarrick". Filoni received checks totalling $3,500 from McCarrick between 2008 and 2013.

=== Prefect of the Congregation for the Evangelization of Peoples ===
On 10 May 2011, Pope Benedict XVI appointed Filoni Prefect of the Congregation for the Evangelization of Peoples, the Vatican department in charge of administering mission territories, in succession to Ivan Cardinal Dias, who had reached retirement age and had health problems. La Nazione remarked that to be reassigned after only four years as Substitute was unusual and speculated that Filoni had been moved because of a "stormy" relationship with Bertone.

The Holy See announced on 6 January 2012 that he would be created a cardinal on 18 February. He was created Cardinal-Deacon of Nostra Signora di Coromoto. On 24 April 2012 Filoni was made a member of the Congregation for the Doctrine of the Faith, Congregation for the Oriental Churches, and the Congregation for Catholic Education. On 24 November 2012 he was appointed a member of the Pontifical Council for Legislative Texts. Filoni took part in the 2013 conclave that elected Pope Francis, and was considered to be a papabile, or possible candidate to be elected pope.

Based on his work with the people of Iraq, Filoni wrote The Church in Iraq.

Pope Francis raised him to the rank of Cardinal Bishop effective 28 June 2018.

Pope Francis named Cardinal Luis Antonio Tagle to succeed Filoni as Prefect of the Congregation on 8 December 2019.

Filoni was a cardinal elector in both the 2013 and the 2025 papal conclave that elected Pope Francis and Pope Leo XIV respectively. He lost this status after his 80th birthday on 15 April 2026.

== Equestrian Order of the Holy Sepulchre ==
Pope Francis named him Grand Master of the Equestrian Order of the Holy Sepulchre of Jerusalem on 8 December 2019.

Diplomatic posts
Preceded by Jean-Paul Gobel	Head of Holy See Study Mission to Hong Kong; 1992 – 17 January 2001	Succeeded by Eugene Nugent
Preceded by Giuseppe Lazzarotto	Apostolic Nuncio to Iraq; 17 January 2001 – 25 February 2006	Succeeded by Francis Chullikatt
Preceded by Giuseppe Lazzarotto	Apostolic Nuncio to Jordan; 17 January 2001 – 25 February 2006	Succeeded by Francis Chullikatt
Preceded by Antonio Franco	Apostolic Nuncio to the Philippines; 25 February 2006 – 9 June 2007	Succeeded by Edward Joseph Adams
Catholic Church titles
Preceded by Giuseppe Ferraioli	— TITULAR — Titular Archbishop of Volturno; 17 January 2001 – 18 February 2012	Succeeded by Angelo Vincenzo Zani
Preceded by Leonardo Sandri	Substitute for General Affairs; 1 July 2007 – 10 May 2011	Succeeded by Giovanni Angelo Becciu
Preceded by Ivan Dias	Prefect of the Congregation for the Evangelization of Peoples; 10 May 2011 – 8 December 2019	Succeeded by Luis Antonio Tagle
Preceded by Ivan Dias	President of the Interdicasterial Commission for Consecrated Religious; 10 May 2011 – 8 December 2019	Succeeded by Luis Antonio Tagle
Preceded by Ivan Dias	Grand Chancellor of the Pontifical Urban University; 10 May 2011 – 8 December 2019	Succeeded by Luis Antonio Tagle
Preceded by Rosalio José Castillo Lara	Cardinal Deacon of Nostra Signora di Coromoto in San Giovanni di Dio; 18 February 2012 – 28 June 2018	Himself as Cardinal Bishop
Himself as Cardinal Deacon	Cardinal Bishop of Nostra Signora di Coromoto in San Giovanni di Dio; 28 June 2018 –	Incumbent
Preceded by Edwin Frederick O'Brien	Grand Master of Equestrian Order of the Holy Sepulchre of Jerusalem; 8 December 2019 –	Incumbent
