= Adolfo Tito Yllana =

Philippine prelate

His Excellency, The Most Reverend Adolfo Tito Yllana
- Apostolic Nuncio Emeritus to Israel; Apostolic Delegate Emeritus to Jerusalem and Palestine; Titular Archbishop of Montecorvino
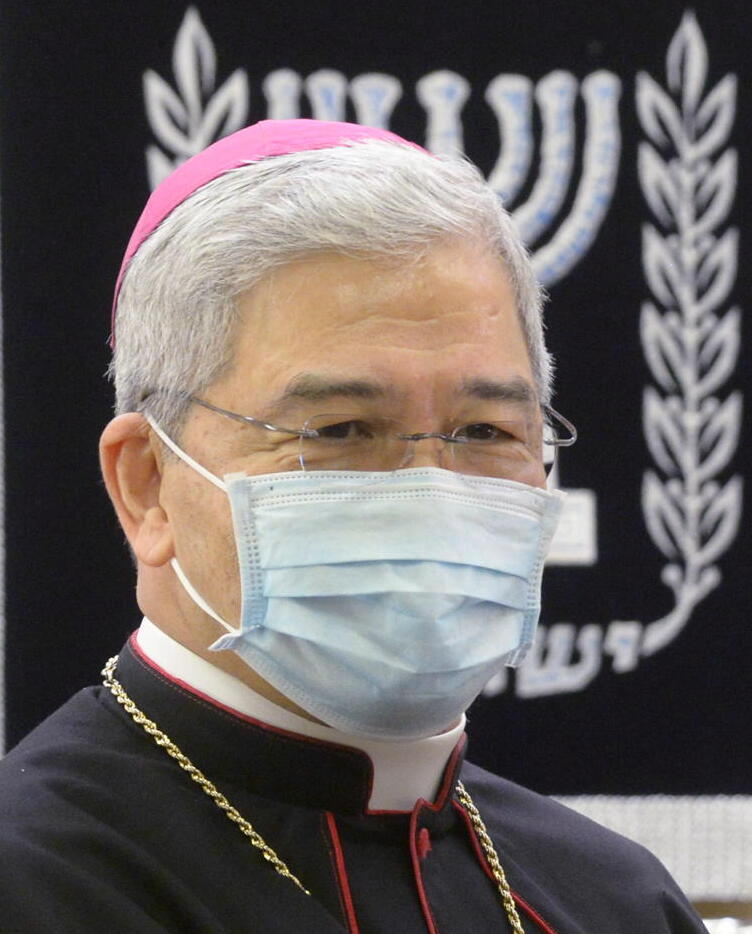
- Adolfo Tito Yllana, Jerusalem September 2021
- Appointed: 3 June 2021
- Retired: 22 January 2026
- Predecessor: Leopoldo Girelli
- Successor: Giorgio Lingua
- Other post: Titular Archbishop of Montecorvino
- Previous posts: Apostolic Nuncio to Cyprus (2021-2023); Apostolic Nuncio to Australia (2015–2021); Apostolic Nuncio to the Democratic Republic of the Congo (2010–2015); Apostolic Nuncio to Pakistan (2006–2010); Apostolic Nuncio to the Solomon Islands (2002–2006); Apostolic Nuncio to Papua New Guinea (2001–2006); Chargé d’affaires to China (1999-2001)

Orders
- Ordination: 19 March 1972 by Teopisto Valderrama Alberto
- Consecration: 13 December 2001 by Pope John Paul II, Leonardo Sandri and Robert Sarah

Personal details
- Born: 6 February 1948 (age 78) Naga, Camarines Sur, Philippines
- Denomination: Roman Catholic Church
- Profession: Sacerdotal Catholic Priest
- Education: Pontifical Lateran University
- Motto: PRÆDICARE ET MINISTRARE
- Coat of arms: Adolfo Tito Yllana's coat of arms

Styles of Adolfo Tito Camacho Yllana
- Reference style: His Excellency; The Most Reverend
- Spoken style: Your Excellency
- Religious style: Archbishop

Adolfo Tito Camacho Yllana (born 6 February 1948) is a Filipino prelate of the Catholic Church who works in the diplomatic service of the Holy See. He has been an archbishop and apostolic nuncio since 2001, the Apostolic Nuncio to Israel as well as Apostolic Delegate to Jerusalem and Palestine from June 2021 to January 2026.

== Biography ==
Adolfo Tito Yllana was born on 6 February 1948 in Naga City, Philippines. He undertook religious studies from the Holy Rosary Seminary also in the same city. On 19 March 1972, he was ordained a priest of the Archdiocese of Caceres. He went on to obtain a doctorate in civil and canon law from the Lateran University in Rome and began his diplomatic career after finishing his studies at the Academia Ecclesiastica, the premier academy for the diplomatic corps in the Vatican.

== Diplomatic career ==
His first diplomatic posts were in Ghana, Sri Lanka, Turkey, Lebanon, Hungary and Taiwan.

On 13 December 2001, he was appointed titular archbishop of Montecorvino and Apostolic Nuncio to Papua New Guinea. He was consecrated by Pope John Paul II on 6 January 2002 in St Peter's Basilica. On February 5, 2022, he was given the additional responsibility of Apostolic Nuncio to the Solomon Islands.

He was appointed apostolic nuncio to Pakistan on 31 March 2006 by Pope Benedict XVI. In November 2007, Archbishop Yllana joined in the celebrations to mark the 100th anniversary of the Sacred Heart Cathedral, Lahore, with a special message from Pope Benedict XVI to the local congregation.

On 21 September 2009, he presided at the consecration in St. Joseph's Cathedral of the new coadjutor bishop of Islamabad-Rawalpindi, Bishop Rufin Anthony. More than 1,500 people attended the event.

On 17 April 2010, the diocese of Faisalabad organized a special ceremony to celebrate its golden jubilee. Archbishop Yllana, Bishop Joseph Coutts (Faisalabad), Archbishop Lawrence Saldanha (Lahore), and Bishop Andrew Francis (Multan) spoke on the occasion. At the jubilee Mass at the Cathedral of Sts. Peter and Paul, attended by about 5,000 Catholics from 21 parishes, Archbishop Yllana said that the Vatican was happy to see the number of priestly and religious vocations in the diocese.

On 20 November 2010, Pope Benedict XVI appointed Yllana as the Apostolic Nuncio to the Democratic Republic of the Congo. On 17 February 2015, Pope Francis appointed Yllana as the Apostolic Nuncio to Australia. During his time as Apostolic Nuncio to Australia, Yllana officially opened the Toowoomba Catholic Schools Office (which had been built on the site of the former Toowoomba South State School) in the presence of the Bishop of Toowoomba, Robert McGuckin.

On 3 June 2021, Pope Francis named him Apostolic Nuncio to Israel and to Cyprus as well as Apostolic Delegate to Jerusalem and Palestine.

On 17 February 2023, Pope Francis assigned his duties of Cyprus to Giovanni Pietro Dal Toso.

On 26 January 2026, Pope Leo XIV accepted his resignation.

== See also ==
- List of heads of the diplomatic missions of the Holy See
