= Alberto Ortega Martín =

Spanish prelate of the Catholic Church (born 1962)

His Excellency, The Most Reverend Alberto Ortega Martín
- Apostolic Nuncio of Venezuela; Titular Archbishop of Midila
- Appointed: 14 May 2024
- Predecessor: Aldo Giordano
- Other post: Titular Archbishop of Midila
- Previous posts: Apostolic Nuncio to Chile (2019-2024); Apostolic Nuncio to Jordan and Iraq (2015-2019)

Orders
- Ordination: 28 April 1990 by Ángel Suquía Goicoechea
- Consecration: 10 October 2015 by Pietro Parolin, Paul Gallagher, and Carlos Osoro Sierra

Personal details
- Born: 14 November 1962 (age 64) Madrid, Spain
- Motto: Sufficit Tibi Gratia Mea

Styles of Alberto Ortega Martín
- Reference style: His Excellency; The Most Reverend
- Spoken style: Your Excellency
- Religious style: Archbishop

Alberto Ortega Martín (born 14 November 1962) is a Spanish prelate of the Catholic Church who works in the diplomatic service of the Holy See.

== Biography ==
Alberto Ortega Martín was born in Madrid, Spain, on 14 November 1962. He was ordained a priest of the Archdiocese of Madrid on 28 April 1990 by Cardinal Ángel Suquía Goicoechea.

== Diplomatic career ==
On 1 July 1997, he joined the diplomatic service of the Holy See and worked in Nicaragua, South Africa, and Lebanon. Beginning in 2004 he worked in Rome at the Secretariat of State, where in 2007 he was given responsibility for the Holy See's representation in North Africa and the Arabian Peninsula. This including working on negotiations to resolve the Israeli-Palestinian conflict.

On 1 August 2015, Pope Francis appointed him titular archbishop of Midila (Algeria) and Apostolic Nuncio to Jordan and Iraq. He received his episcopal consecration on 10 October 2015 from Cardinal Pietro Parolin.

On 7 October 2019, he was named Apostolic Nuncio to Chile. He arrived in Chile at the height of the clerical abuse crisis in that country which triggered the mass resignation of the entire local episcopate.

On 14 May 2024, he was named nuncio to Venezuela. On 14 August he presented his Letters of Credence to Nicolás Maduro.

== See also ==
- List of heads of the diplomatic missions of the Holy See
