= Angelo Mottola =

Italian Roman Catholic archbishop (1935–2014)

Angelo Mottola (10 January 1935 – 8 October 2014) was a Roman Catholic archbishop and diplomat.

Born in Aversa, Italy, Mottola was ordained to the priesthood on 2 April 1960.

Before joining the diplomatic service of the Holy See, he was on the staff of the Congregation for the Evangelization of Peoples.

Mottola was named titular archbishop of Cercina and apostolic nuncio to Iran on 16 July 1999. He was ordained a bishop on 21 September 1999.

On 25 January 2007, Mottola was appointed apostolic nuncio to Montenegro, the first to hold that position.

He resigned on 10 January 2010.
