= List of episcopal appointments by Pope Leo XIV =

This article is a list of priests and bishops that were appointed either to succeed or to new episcopal assignments during the pontificate of Pope Leo XIV.

== 2025 ==
No.	Bishop			New Episcopal Appointment	Date of Episcopal Appointment	Ref.
No.	Name	Details	Church Status before Appointment	New Episcopal Appointment	Date of Episcopal Appointment	Ref.
May 2025
1.	Miguel Ángel Contreras Llajaruna	5 July 1979; Cajabamba, Peru	Superior of the South American Province of the Marist Fathers	Auxiliary Bishop of Callao; Titular Bishop of Babra	15 May 2025	
2.	Dave Dean Capucao	25 September 1965; Naga, Camarines Sur, Philippines	Priest of the Territorial Prelature of Infanta	Prelate of Infanta	16 May 2025	
3.	Luigi Bianco	3 March 1960; Montemagno, Asti, Italy	Apostolic Nuncio to Uganda; Titular Archbishop of Falerone	Apostolic Nuncio to Slovenia; Apostolic Delegate to Kosovo	20 May 2025	
4.	Jean Pelletier	9 March 1963; Angers, Maine-et-Loire, France	Priest of the Diocese of Mende	Bishop of Mende	20 May 2025	
5.	Dominique Blanchet	15 February 1966; Cholet, Maine-et-Loire, France	Bishop of Créteil	Prelate of Mission de France at Pontigny	21 May 2025	
6.	Daniel Palau Valero	7 December 1972; Barcelona, Spain	Priest of the Archdiocese of Barcelona	Bishop of Lleida	21 May 2025	
7.	Valter Magno de Carvalho	22 February 1973; Capela Nova, Minas Gerais, Brazil	Auxiliary Bishop of São Salvador da Bahia; Titular Bishop of Giufi	Bishop of Tuiutaba	22 May 2025	
8.	Beat Grögli	20 September 1970; Wil, St. Gallen, Switzerland	Priest of the Diocese of Sankt Gallen	Bishop of Saint Gallen	22 May 2025	
9.	Antônio Emídio Vilar	24 November 1957; São Sebastião do Paraíso, Minas Gerais, Brazil	Bishop of São José do Rio Preto	Archbishop of São José do Rio Preto	22 May 2025	
10.	Michael Pham	27 January 1967; Đà Nẵng, Hải Châu, Vietnam	Auxiliary Bishop of San Diego; Titular Bishop of Cercina	Bishop of San Diego	22 May 2025	
11.	Joseph Ðặng Ðức Ngân	16 June 1957; Hanoi, Vietnam	Coadjutor Archbishop of Huế	Archbishop of Huế	24 May 2025	
12.	Pavol Šajgalík	13 November 1964; Bratislava, Czechoslovakia	Professed Capuchin priest	Military Ordinary of Slovakia	27 May 2025	
13.	Alexander Rivera Vielma	6 March 1974; Mérida, Venezuela	Priest of the Archdiocese of Mérida (Venezuela)	Bishop of San Carlos de Venezuela	27 May 2025	
14.	Raúl Martín	9 October 1957; Buenos Aires, Argentina	Bishop of Santa Rosa	Archbishop of Paraná	28 May 2025	
15.	Alejandro Pablo Benna	12 November 1959; Buenos Aires, Argentina	Bishop of Alto Valle del Río Negro	Bishop of Morón	28 May 2025	
16.	Brice Armand Ibombo	23 November 1973; Abala, Republic of the Congo	Priest of the Archdiocese of Brazzaville	Bishop of Ouesso	28 May 2025	
17.	Clésio Facco	1 April 1971; Santa Maria, Rio Grande do Sul, Brazil	Professed Pallottine priest	Bishop of Uruguaiana	28 May 2025	
18.	Francisco Agamenilton Damascena	26 June 1975; Caicó, Rio Grande do Norte, Brazil	Bishop of Rubiataba–Mozarlândia	Bishop of Luziânia	28 May 2025	
19.	Pedro Bismarck Chau	18 July 1964; Managua, Nicaragua	Priest of the Archdiocese of Newark	Auxiliary Bishop of Newark; Titular Bishop of Catrum	30 May 2025	
20.	Mathew Polycarpos Manakkarakavil	10 November 1955; Puthoor, Kerala, India	Titular Bishop of Canatha; Auxiliary Eparch of Trivandrum (Syro-Malankara)	Eparch of Mavelikara (Syro-Malankara)	30 May 2025	
21.	Josep-Lluís Serrano Pentinat	19 March 1977; Tivissa, Tarragona, Spain	Coadjutor Bishop of Urgell	Bishop of Urgell	31 May 2025	
22.	Jorge Enrique Malpica Bejarano	2 August 1967; Guachetá, Ubaté, Colombia	Priest of the Diocese of Zipaquirá	Bishop of Granada en Colombia	31 May 2025	
June 2025
23.	Mark Eckman	9 February 1959; Pittsburgh, Pennsylvania, United States	Auxiliary Bishop of Pittsburgh; Titular Bishop of Sitifis	Bishop of Pittsburgh	4 June 2025	
24.	Simon Peter Engurait	28 August 1971; Ngora, Uganda	Priest of the Diocese of Houma-Thibodaux	Bishop of Houma-Thibodaux	5 June 2025	
25.	Ramón Alberto Rolón Güepsa	28 February 1959; Arboledas, Colombia	Bishop of Montería	Bishop of Chiquinquirá	6 June 2025	
26.	Nélio Pereira Pita, CM	11 October 1973; Estreito de Câmara de Lobos, Madeira, Portugal	Vincentian priest	Auxiliary Bishop of Braga; Titular Bishop of Garba	6 June 2025	
27.	Jose Sebastian Thekkumcherikunnel	24 December 1962; Kalaketty, Kottayam, Kerala, India	Priest of the Diocese of Jalandhar	Bishop of Jalandhar	7 June 2025	
28.	Joseph Lin Yuntuan	12 March 1952; Fuqing, Fujian, China	Priest of the Archdiocese of Fuzhou	Auxiliary Bishop of Fuzhou	11 June 2025	
29.	Jenrry Johel Velásquez Hernández	23 July 1977; San Jerónimo, Comayagua, Honduras	Priest of the Diocese of Comayagua	Bishop of La Ceiba	12 June 2025	
30.	Alfonso García López	23 February 1971; Juradó, Chocó, Colombia	Priest of the Diocese of Istmina-Tadó	Apostolic Vicar of Guapi	14 June 2025	
31.	Youhanna Rafic El Warcha	22 October 1971; Okaibe, Keserwan-Jbeil, Lebanon	Titular Bishop of Apamea; Curial Bishop of Antioch (Maronites)	Auxiliary Bishop of Joubbé, Sarba and Jounieh (Maronites)	14 June 2025	
32.	Angelo Raffaele Panzetta	26 August 1966; Pulsano, Taranto, Apulia, Italy	Coadjutor Archbishop of Lecce	Archbishop of Lecce	18 June 2025	
33.	Shane A. Mackinlay	5 June 1965; Brunswick, Melbourne, Australia	Bishop of Sandhurst	Archbishop of Brisbane	18 June 2025	
34.	Benoni Ambăruș	22 September 1974; Bacău, Romania	Auxiliary Bishop of Rome; Titular Bishop of Tronto	Archbishop of Matera-Irsina; Bishop of Tricarico; In persona episcopi	18 June 2025	
35.	Dorival Souza Barreto Júnior	10 March 1964; Jequié, Bahia, Brazil	Auxiliary Bishop of São Salvador da Bahia; Titular Bishop of Tindari	Bishop of Januária	18 June 2025	
36.	Janez Kozinc	21 August 1975; Celje, Slovenia	Priest of the Diocese of Celje	Bishop of Murska Sobota	18 June 2025	
37.	Gábor Pintér	9 March 1964; Kunszentmárton, Hungary	Apostolic Nuncio to New Zealand, Fiji, Palau, Federated States of Micronesia, Vanuatu, the Cook Islands, Kiribati, the Marshall Islands, Samoa and Nauru	Apostolic Delegate to the Pacific Ocean	18 June 2025	
38.	Anthony John Ireland	28 April 1957; Melbourne, Victoria, Australia	Auxiliary Bishop of Melbourne; Titular Bishop of Carinola	Archbishop of Hobart	20 June 2025	
39.	José Luis Cerra Luna	24 July 1963; Torreón, Coahuila, Mexico	Priest of the Diocese of Matamoros-Reynosa	Bishop of Nogales	20 June 2025	
40.	Germán Humberto Barbosa Mora	24 December 1974; Bogotá, Colombia	Priest of the Diocese of Engativá	Auxiliary Bishop of Bogotá; Titular Bishop of Uzalis	20 June 2025	
41.	Andrés Amaury Rosario Henriquez	23 September 1976; Tamboril, Dominican Republic	Priest of the Archdiocese of Santiago de los Caballeros	Auxiliary Bishop of Santiago de los Caballeros; Titular Bishop of Autenti	23 June 2025	
42.	Mamiarisoa Modeste Randrianifahanana	18 June 1967; Fiakarana, Madagascar	Priest of the Archdiocese of Antananarivo	Auxiliary Bishop of Antananarivo; Titular Bishop of Iucundiana	26 June 2025	
43.	José Antonio Satué Huerto	6 February 1968; Huesca, Aragon, Spain	Bishop of Teruel and Albarracín	Bishop of Málaga	27 June 2025	
44.	Elias Frank	15 August 1962; Bantwal, Karnataka, India	Bishop of Asansol	Coadjutor Archbishop of Calcutta	28 June 2025	
45.	Pierre Suon Hangly	14 April 1972; Phnom Penh, Cambodia	Apostolic Prefect of Kampong Cham	Coadjutor Apostolic Vicar of Phnom Penh	28 June 2025	
July 2025
46.	Mark S. Rivituso	September 20, 1961; St. Louis, Missouri, United States	Auxiliary Bishop of St. Louis; Titular Bishop of Turuzi	Archbishop of Mobile	1 July 2025	
47.	Santo Marcianò	10 April 1960; Reggio Calabria, Italy	Military Ordinary of Italy	Bishop of Frosinone-Veroli-Ferentino; Bishop of Anagni-Alatri; In persona episcopi	1 July 2025	
48.	Eduard Kava	17 April 1978; Mostyska, Lviv Oblast, Ukraine	Auxiliary Bishop of Lviv; Titular Bishop of Cilibia	Bishop of Kamianets-Podilskyi	1 July 2025	
49.	Daniel Elias Garcia	30 August 1960; Cameron, Texas, United States	Bishop of Monterey in California	Bishop of Austin	2 July 2025	
50.	Pedro Cunha Cruz	16 June 1964; Rio de Janeiro, Brazil	Bishop of Campanha	Bishop of Nova Friburgo	2 July 2025	
51.	Héctor David García Osorio	23 September 1966; Concepción de María, Choluteca, Honduras	Bishop of Yoro	Bishop of Santa Rosa de Copán	3 July 2025	
52.	Gabriel dos Santos Filho	8 November 1966; Salvador, Bahia, Brazil	Priest of the Archdiocese of São Salvador da Bahia	Auxiliary Bishop of São Salvador da Bahia; Titular Bishop of Altiburo	4 July 2025	
53.	Gilvan Pereira Rodrigues	19 September 1972; Mortugaba, Bahia, Brazil	Priest of the Diocese of Caetité	Auxiliary Bishop of São Salvador da Bahia; Titular Bishop of Tisili	4 July 2025	
54.	Antonysamy Savarimuthu	8 December 1960; Tamil Nadu, India	Bishop of Palayamkottai	Archbishop of Madurai	5 July 2025	
55.	Simon Peter Kamomoe	26 November 1962; Gatundu, Kenya	Auxiliary Bishop of Nairobi; Titular Bishop of Thubunae in Numidia	Auxiliary Bishop of Wote	5 July 2025	
56.	Jacek Piotr Tendej, CM	26 June 1963; Handzlówka, Poland	Vincentian priest, Seminary Rector in Port Moresby	Bishop of Alotau-Sideia	7 July 2025	
57.	Justin Ain Soongie	2 June 1973; Tsikiro, Papua New Guinea	Auxiliary Bishop of Wabag; Titular Bishop of Forma	Bishop of Wabag	7 July 2025	
58.	Ronald Gerhardus Wilhelmus Cornelissen	12 December 1964; Gaanderen, Netherlands	Priest of the Archdiocese Utrecht	Bishop of Groningen-Leeuwarden	7 July 2025	
59.	Matthew Kwang-Hee Choi	21 September 1977; Seoul, South Korea	Priest of the Archdiocese Seoul	Auxiliary Bishop of Seoul; Titular Bishop of Elephantaria in Mauretania	8 July 2025	
60.	Abilio Martínez Varea	29 January 1964; Autol, La Rioja, Spain	Bishop of Osma-Soria	Bishop of Ciudad Real	9 July 2025	
61.	Thomas J. Hennen	4 July 1978; Ottumwa, Iowa, United States	Priest of the Diocese of Davenport	Bishop of Baker	10 July 2025	
62.	John Kiplimo Lelei	15 August 1958; Eldoret, Kenya	Auxiliary Bishop of Eldoret; Titular Bishop of Mons in Numidia	Bishop of Kapsabet	10 July 2025	
63.	Mariusz Dmyterko	29 December 1979; Bytów, Poland	Priest of the Eparchy of Wrocław–Koszalin of the Ukrainians	Auxiliary Bishop of Wrocław–Koszalin of the Ukrainians	10 July 2025	
64.	Michel Guillaud	24 June 1961; Villeurbanne, France	Priest of the Archdiocese of Lyon	Bishop of Constantine	11 July 2025	
65.	Krzysztof Dukielski	10 April 1978; Radom, Poland	Priest of the Diocese of Radom	Auxiliary Bishop of Radom; Titular Bishop of Catula	12 July 2025	
66.	Alberto Sy Uy	18 October 1966; Ubay, Bohol, Philippines	Bishop of Tagbilaran	Archbishop of Cebu	16 July 2025	
67.	Makhoul Farha	28 December 1959; Ras Baalbek, Lebanon	Priest of the Archeparchy of Baalbek of the Greek-Melkites	Archbishop of Baalbek of the Greek-Melkites	16 July 2025	
68.	Fredrik Hansen P.S.S.	13 June 1979; Drammen, Norway	Coadjutor Bishop of Oslo	Bishop of Oslo	16 July 2025	
69.	Osório Citora Afonso	6 May 1972; Ribáuè, Mozambique	Auxiliary Bishop of Maputo; Titular Bishop of Putia in Numidia	Bishop of Quelimane	25 July 2025	
August 2025
70.	Júlio Endi Akamine S.A.C.	20 November 1962; Garça, Brazil	Archbishop of Sorocaba	Archbishop of Belém do Pará	6 August 2025	
71.	Eric Soviguidi	21 March 1971; Abomey, Benin	Priest of the Archdiocese of Cotonou	Apostolic Nuncio to Burkina Faso; Titular Archbishop of Cerenzia	15 August 2025	
72.	Francis Serrao S.J.	15 August 1959; Moodabidri, India	Bishop of Shimoga	Bishop of Mysore	15 August 2025	
73.	Ralph O’Donnell	31 August 1969; Omaha, Nebraska, United States	Priest of the Archdioecese of Omaha	Bishop of Jefferson City	19 August 2025	
74.	Pierre-Antoine Bozo	14 March 1966; Argentan, France	Bishop of Limoges	Coadjutor Bishop of La Rochelle and Saintes	19 August 2025	
75.	Paulo Alves Romão	6 August 1964; Barra do Jacaré, Paraná, Brazil	Auxiliary Bishop of São Sebastião do Rio de Janeiro; Titular Bishop of Calama	Bishop of Paranaguá	20 August 2025	
76.	Carlos Enrique Samaniego López	8 October 1973; Mexico City, Mexico	Auxiliary Bishop of Mexico; Titular Bishop of Cillio	Bishop of Texcoco	21 August 2025	
77.	Pedro Cesário Palma O.F.M. Cap.	15 August 1961; Pinhalão, Paraná, Brazil	Priest of the Diocese of Umuarama	Bishop of Jardim	22 August 2025	
78.	José Arturo Cepeda	15 May 1969; San Luis Potosí, Mexico	Auxiliary Bishop of Detroit; Titular Bishop of Tagase	Auxiliary Bishop of San Antonio	26 August 2025	
79.	Manuel Antonio Ruíz de la Rosa	27 August 1965; Bayaguana, Dominican Republic	Priest of the Archdiocese of Santo Domingo	Bishop of Stella Maris	27 August 2025	
80.	James Patteril C.M.F.	27 July 1962; Mangalore, India	Claretian Priest	Bishop of Belthangady (Syro-Malabar)	28 August 2025	
81.	Engelberto Polino Sánchez	14 March 1966; Teuchitlán, Mexico	Auxiliary Bishop of Guadalajara; Titular Bishop of Vazari-Didda	Bishop of Tepic	28 August 2025	
82.	Joseph Thachaparambath	24 February 1969; Nalumukku, India	Priest of the Carmelites of Mary Immaculate	Bishop of Adilabad (Syro-Malabar)	28 August 2025	
83.	Andrzej Przybylski	26 October 1964; Łowicz, Poland	Auxiliary Bishop of Częstochowa; Titular Bishop of Orte	Archbishop of Katowice	29 August 2025	
84.	Andres C. Ligot	30 October 1965; Laoag, Philippines	Priest of the Diocese of San José in California	Auxiliary Bishop of San José in California; Titular Bishop of Croae	29 August 2025	
September 2025
85.	Charles Duval C.Ss.R.	12 April 1964; Gatineau, Quebec, Canada	Coadjutor Archbishop of Grouard–McLennan	Archbishop of Grouard–McLennan	6 September 2025	
86.	Charlie Malapitan Inzon O.M.I.	24 November 1965; Pilar, Sorsogon, Philippines	Apostolic Vicar of Jolo	Archbishop of Cotabato	8 September 2025	
87.	Joseph Wang Zhengui	19 November 1962; Zhangjiakou, Hebei, China	Priest of the Diocese of Xianxian	Bishop of Zhangjiakou	10 September 2025	
88.	Eric Soviguidi	21 March 1971; Abomey, Benin	Apostolic Nuncio to Burkina Faso	Apostolic Nuncio to Niger	12 September 2025	
89.	Charles Azzopardi	20 April 1962; Gibraltar	Priest of the Diocese of Gibraltar	Bishop of Gibraltar	12 September 2025	
90.	Joseph Ma Yan'en	15 January 1960; Baoding, Hebei, China	Bishop of Xiwanzi	Auxiliary Bishop of Zhangjiakou	12 September 2025	
91.	Wojciech Skibicki	23 May 1970; Skrwilno, Poland	Auxiliary Bishop of Elbląg; Titular Bishop of Casae Nigrae	Bishop of Elbląg	13 September 2025	
92.	Piero Pioppo	29 September 1960; Savona, Liguria, Italy	Apostolic Nuncio to Indonesia and ASEAN	Apostolic Nuncio of Spain and Andorra	15 September 2025	
93.	Renauld Dupont de Dinechin	25 March 1958; Lille, France	Bishop of Soissons	Bishop of Luçon	16 September 2025	
94.	Mirosław Wachowski	8 May 1970; Pisz, Poland	Prelate of Honour of His Holiness	Apostolic Nuncio to Iraq; Titular Archbishop of Villamagna in Proconsulari	18 September 2025	
95.	Kuriakose Thomas Thadathil	27 March 1962; Kottayam, Kerala, India	Priest of the Archeparchy of Tiruvalla (Syro-Malankara)	Apostolic Visitator for Europe; Titular Bishop of Mariamme	19 September 2025	
96.	Yoohanon Alexios Kuttiyil	30 May 1982; Kizhakketheruvu , Kerala, India	Priest of the Archeparchy of Trivandum (Syro-Malankara)	Auxiliary Bishop of Trivandum (Syro-Malankara); Titular Bishop of Canatha	19 September 2025	
97.	Elias Frank	15 August 1962; Bantwal, Karnataka, India	Coadjutor Archbishop of Calcutta	Archbishop of Calcutta	20 September 2025	
98.	James F. Checchio	21 April 1966; Camden, New Jersey, United States	Bishop of Metuchen	Coadjutor Archbishop of New Orleans	24 September 2025	
October 2025
99.	Ihor Rantsya	8 March 1978; Opilsko, Ukraine	Priest of the Eparchy of Saint Vladimir the Great of Paris	Bishop of Saint Vladimir the Great of Paris (Ukrainian Greek Catholic)	1 October 2025	
100.	Edwin Oracion Panergo	7 September 1971; Lucena, Philippines	Priest of the Diocese of Lucena	Bishop of Boac	4 October 2025	
101.	Fabien Lejeusne A.A.	28 October 1973; Tournai, Belgium	Superior of the Province of Europe of the Assumptionists	Bishop of Namur	6 October 2025	
102.	Frédéric Rossignol C.S.Sp.	5 January 1974; Tournai, Belgium	Spiritual director of the Saint Paul the Apostle Pontifical Missionary College	Bishop of Tournai	6 October 2025	
103.	Pedro Alexandre Simões Gouveia Fernandes C.S.Sp.	22 June 1969; Lisbon, Portugal	Former superior general of the Portuguese Province of the Spiritans	Bishop of Portalegre-Castelo Branco	7 October 2025	
104.	Luis Carlos Lerma Martínez	21 July 1962; Delicias, Chihuahua, Mexico	Priest of the Archdiocese of Chihuahua	Bishop of Nuevo Laredo	7 October 2025	
105.	Sylvain Bataille	22 July 1964; Soissons, France	Bishop of Saint-Étienne	Archbishop of Bourges	16 October 2025	
106.	Josef Grünwidl	31 January 1963; Hollabrunn, Austria	Priest of the Archdiocese of Vienna	Archbishop of Vienna	17 October 2025	
107.	Selvarajan Dasan	23 December 1987; Valiyavila, Kerala, India	Coadjutor Bishop of Neyyattinkara	Bishop of Neyyattinkara	18 October 2025	
108.	Carlos Tomás Morel Diplán	1 October 1969; Moca, Dominican Republic	Bishop of La Vega	Coadjutor Archbishop of Santo Domingo	18 October 2025	
109.	Mark O'Connell	25 June 1964; Scarborough, Ontario, Canada	Auxiliary Bishop of Boston; Titular Bishop of Gigthi	Bishop of Albany	20 October 2025	
110.	Nicholas Hudson	14 February 1959; London, England, United Kingdom	Auxiliary Bishop of Westminster; Titular Bishop of St Germans	Bishop of Plymouth	21 October 2025	
111.	Jean-Pierre Tanoh Tiémélé	22 February 1969; Abidjan, Ivory Coast	Priest of the Diocese of Grand-Bassam	Bishop of Abengourou	22 October 2025	
112.	Alexis Youlo Touabli	1 January 1961; Béréblo, Ivory Coast	Bishop of Agboville	Bishop of San-Pédro-en-Côte d'Ivoire	22 October 2025	
113.	Franklin Misael Betancourt	30 October 1967; Guaitarilla, Colombia	Priest of the Diocese of Ipiales	Bishop of Tumaco	23 October 2025	
114.	Jean Nicolas Rakotojaona	18 January 1973; Anosy Avaratra, Madagascar	Auxiliary Bishop of Morondava; Titular Bishop of Dragonara	Coadjutor Archbishop of Fianarantsoa	25 October 2025	
115.	Antony Kattiparambil	14 October 1970; Mundamveli, Kerala, India	Priest of the Diocese of Cochin	Bishop of Cochin	25 October 2025	
116.	Stephen Eustace Victor Fernandes	20 September 1961; Mumbai, Maharashtra, India	Priest of the Archdiocese of Bombay	Auxiliary Bishop of Bombay; Titular Bishop of Abbir Maius	25 October 2025	
117.	George Luís Amaral Muniz	14 December 1972; Matinha, Brazil	Priest of the Diocese of Viana	Bishop of Propriá	25 October 2025	
118.	Jacob Aba S.M.	6 January 1976; Laita, Solomon Islands	Priest of the Archdiocese of Honiara	Bishop of Auki	28 October 2025	
119.	Andrés Gabriel Ferrada Moreira	10 June 1969; Santiago, Chile	Secretary of the Dicastery for the Clergy; Titular Archbishop of Tiburnia (retained as archbishop ad personam)	Bishop of San Bartolomé de Chillán	31 October 2025	
November 2025
120.	Joseph Andrzej Dabrowski CSMA	17 July 1964; Wysoka Strzyżowska, Poland	Bishop of Charlottetown	Bishop of Hamilton	1 November 2025	
121.	Simon Almeida	4 November 1960; Ghas, Maharashtra, India	Priest of the Diocese of Poona	Bishop of Poona	1 November 2025	
122.	Brian Udaigwe	19 July 1964; Tiko, Cameroon	Apostolic Nuncio to Ethiopia	Apostolic Nuncio to Djibouti; Apostolic Delegate to Somalia	3 November 2025	
123.	David William Antonio	29 December 1963; Santo Domingo, Ilocos Sur, Philippines	Bishop of Ilagan	Archbishop of Nueva Segovia	4 November 2025	
124.	Pedro Orlando Castro Castro	28 June 1961; Lima, Peru	Franciscan priest	Vicar Apostolic Coadjutor of San Ramón	4 November 2025	
125.	Gilson Meurer	28 September 1973; Florianópolis, Brazil	Priest of the Archdiocese of Florianópolis	Bishop of Lages	5 November 2025	
126.	Joaquim Giovanni Mol Guimarães	6 January 1960; Ponte Nova, Brazil	Coadjutor Bishop of Santos	Bishop of Santos	5 November 2025	
127.	Claudiu-Lucian Pop	22 July 1972; Pișcolt, Romania	Eparchial Bishop of Cluj-Gherla	Major Archbishop of Făgăraș and Alba Iulia	6 November 2025	
128.	Walter Jorge Pinto	12 February 1963; Ubá, Brazil	Bishop of União da Vitória	Bishop of Campanha	7 November 2025	
129.	Benedito Araújo	21 November 1963; Paço do Lumiar, Brazil	Bishop of Guajará-Mirim	Bishop of Campo Maior	7 November 2025	
130.	John Kwamevi Cudjoe S.V.D.	27 December 1975; Accra, Ghana	Verbite priest	Auxiliary Bishop of Guayaquil; Titular Bishop of Calama	11 November 2025	
131.	Niall Coll	25 August 1963; Letterkenny, Ireland	Bishop of Ossory	Bishop of Raphoe	13 November 2025	
132.	José Camilo Arbeláez Montoya	18 June 1961; Bogotá, Colombia	Priest of the Archdiocese of Medellín	Bishop of Vélez	14 November 2025	
133.	Susai Jesu OMI	17 May 1971; Pushpavanam, India	Priest of the Archdiocese of Edmonton	Archbishop of Keewatin–Le Pas	17 November 2025	
134.	Marko Kovač	10 January 1981; Zagreb, Croatia	Priest of the Archdiocese of Zagreb	Auxiliary Bishop of Zagreb; Titular Bishop of Sarda	17 November 2025	
135.	Vlado Razum	6 December 1960; Croatia	Priest of the Archdiocese of Zagreb	Auxiliary Bishop of Zagreb; Titular Bishop of Stagnum	17 November 2025	
136.	Joel Ocampo Gorostieta	21 August 1963; El Paso de Tierra Caliente, Mexico	Bishop of Ciudad Altamirano	Bishop of Zamora in Mexico	20 November 2025	
137.	Elieser Antonio Rivero Barrios	15 August 1975; Carora, Venezuela	Priest of the Diocese of San Felipe, Venezuela	Bishop of San Fernando de Apure	21 November 2025	
138.	Miro Relota O.F.M.	1 July 1965; Busovača, Bosnia and Herzegovina	Definitor of the Franciscan Province of Bosna Srebrena	Military Ordinary of Bosnia and Herzegovina	21 November 2025	
139.	Stephen Hero	19 December 1969; Montréal, Québec, Canada	Bishop of Prince Albert	Archbishop of Edmonton	21 November 2025	
140.	Samuel Naceno Agcaracar S.V.D.	4 December 1969; Claveria, Cagayan, Philippines	Rector of the Divine Word Seminary in Tagaytay City	Bishop of San Jose, Nueva Ecija	21 November 2025	
141.	Javier Herrera Corona	15 May 1968; Autlán, Jalisco, Mexico	Apostolic Nuncio to Republic of the Congo and Gabon; Titular Archbishop of Vulturaria	Apostolic Nuncio to Algeria	22 November 2025	
142.	Yohanes Hans Monteiro	15 April 1971; Larantuka, Indonesia	Priest of the Diocese of Larantuka	Bishop of Larantuka	22 November 2025	
143.	Rabindra Kumar Ranasingh	9 July 1972; Kasabasa, India	Priest of the Archdiocese of Cuttack-Bhubaneswar	Auxiliary Bishop of Cuttack-Bhubaneswar; Titular Bishop of Thuburbo Majus	22 November 2025	
144.	Cardinal Grzegorz Ryś	9 February 1964; Kraków, Poland	Archbishop of Łódź	Archbishop of Kraków	26 November 2025	
145.	Jesús Alberto Torres Ariza	6 June 1975; Urumita, Colombia	Priest of the Diocese of Valledupar	Bishop of San José del Guaviare	26 November 2025	
146.	Joshy George Pottackal O.Carm.	30 April 1977; Meenkunnam, Kerala, India	Regional superior of the Carmelites	Auxiliary Bishop of Mainz; Titular Bishop of Ceramussa	26 November 2025	
147.	Celso Alexandre	2 September 1969; Chavantes, São Paulo, Brazil	Priest of the Diocese of Ourinhos	Auxiliary Bishop of São Paulo; Titular Bishop of Capsa	26 November 2025	
148.	Márcio Antonio Vidal de Negreiros O.S.A.	8 October 1967; Dois Córregos, São Paulo, Brazil	Augustinian priest	Auxiliary Bishop of São Paulo; Titular Bishop of Catula	26 November 2025	
149.	Martin Marahrens	24 May 1977; Gahrden, Germany	Priest of the Diocese of Hildesheim	Auxiliary Bishop of Hildesheim; Titular Bishop of Cercina	28 November 2025	
150.	Edward Baretto	5 January 1965; Nirkan, India	Priest of the Diocese of Darjeeling	Coadjutor Bishop of Darjeeling	29 November 2025	
151.	Jânison de Sá Santos	8 December 1969; Propriá, Brazil	Priest of the Diocese of Propriá	Auxiliary Bishop of Fortaleza; Titular Bishop of Cillium	29 November 2025	
152.	Antônio Carlos do Nascimento	22 November 1972; Fortaleza, Brazil	Priest of the Archdiocese of Fortaleza	Auxiliary Bishop of Fortaleza; Titular Bishop of Cibaliana	29 November 2025	
December 2025
153.	Mario Alberto Avilés C.O.	16 September 1969; Mexico City, Mexico	Auxiliary Bishop of Brownsville; Titular Bishop of Cataquas	Bishop of Corpus Christi	1 December 2025	
154.	François Halyday Mbouangui	4 October 1977; Mindouli, Republic of the Congo	Priest of the Diocese of Nkayi	Coadjutor Bishop of Nkayi	1 December 2025	
155.	Evandro Campos Maria	25 April 1974; Belo Horizonte, Brazil	Priest of the Archdiocese of Belo Horizonte	Auxiliary Bishop of Belo Horizonte; Titular Bishop of Cilibia	3 December 2025	
156.	John Mario Mesa Palacio	8 June 1966; Belmira, Colombia	Priest of the Diocese of Santa Rosa de Osos	Vicar Apostolic of Leticia	4 December 2025	
157.	Salvador González Morales	20 December 1971; Mexico City, Mexico	Auxiliary Bishop of Cancún-Chetumal; Titular Bishop of Lacubaza	Bishop of Cancún-Chetumal	6 December 2025	
158.	José Eugenio Ramos Delgado	28 October 1973; Monclova, Mexico	Priest of the Archdiocese of Monterrey	Auxiliary Bishop of Monterrey; Titular Bishop of Mattiana	6 December 2025	
159.	Andrés Carrascosa Coso	16 December 1955; Cuenca, Spain	Apostolic Nuncio to Ecuador; Titular Archbishop of Elo	Apostolic Nuncio to Portugal	11 December 2025	
160.	Luciano Maza Huamán	4 June 1957; Castilla, Peru	Priest of the Archdiocese of Piura	Archbishop of Piura	12 December 2025	
161.	Juan Carlos Asqui Pilco	7 December 1972; Tacna, Peru	Auxiliary Bishop of Tacna y Moquegua; Titular Bishop of Arpi	Bishop Prelate of Chuquibamba	12 December 2025	
162.	Vincent Ouma Odundo	1 June 1978; Kisumu, Kenya	Priest of the Archdiocese of Kisumu	Auxiliary Bishop of Kisumu; Titular Bishop of Giru Marcelli	14 December 2025	
163.	Mohottige Don Nishantha Sagara Jayamanne S.S.S.	25 June 1970; Bopitiya, Sri Lanka	Priest of Congregation of the Blessed Sacrament	Bishop of Anuradhapura	16 December 2025	
164.	Lucio Andrice Muandula	9 October 1959; Maputo, Mozambique	Bishop of Xai-Xai	Bishop of Chimoio	17 December 2025	
165.	Ramon Bejarano	17 July 1969; Laredo, Texas, United States	Auxiliary Bishop of San Diego; Titular Bishop of Carpi	Bishop of Monterey in California	17 December 2025	
166.	Ronald Hicks	4 August 1967; Chicago, Illinois, United States	Bishop of Joliet	Archbishop of New York	18 December 2025	
167.	Richard Moth	8 July 1958; Chingola, Zambia	Bishop of Arundel and Brighton	Archbishop of Westminster	19 December 2025	
168.	Manuel de Jesús Rodríguez	15 January 1974; Santo Domingo, Dominican Republic	Priest of the Diocese of Brooklyn	Bishop of Palm Beach	19 December 2025	
169.	Peter Dai Bui	11 January 1970; Phú Quốc, Vietnam	Priest of the Diocese of Phoenix	Auxiliary Bishop of Phoenix; Titular Bishop of Ausafa	19 December 2025	
170.	Germanus Kwak Jin-Sang	20 December 1964; Suwon, South Korea	Priest of the Diocese of Suwon	Auxiliary Bishop of Suwon; Titular Bishop of Forma	20 December 2025	
171.	James Misko	18 June 1970; Los Angeles, California, United States	Priest of the Diocese of Austin	Bishop of Tucson	22 December 2025	
172.	Gerard Bradley	22 October 1960; London, England, United Kingdom	Priest of the Archdiocese of Southwark	Auxiliary Bishop of Southwark; Titular Bishop of Beverley	22 December 2025	
173.	António Manuel Bogaio Constantino M.C.C.J.	9 November 1969; Tete, Mozambique	Auxiliary Bishop of Beira; Titular Bishop of Sutunurca	Bishop of Caia	23 December 2025	
174.	Simon Kofi Appiah	1 July 1964; Teteman, Ghana	Priest of the Diocese of Jasikan	Bishop of Jasikan	23 December 2025	
175.	Alberto Valentín Castillo García	29 September 1969; La Guaira, Venezuela	Priest of the Diocese of La Guaira	Bishop of Los Teques	27 December 2025	
176.	Sergio Roberto Bosco	1 February 1970; Sampacho, Argentina	Priest of the Diocese of Villa de la Concepción del Río Cuarto	Auxiliary Bishop of Villa de la Concepción del Río Cuarto; Titular Bishop of Cissi	30 December 2025	
177.	Milton Zonta, S.D.S.	2 June 1960; Videira, Brazil	Former superior general of the Salvatorians	Coadjutor Bishop of Criciúma	30 December 2025	

== 2026 ==
No.	Bishop			New Episcopal Appointment	Date of Episcopal Appointment	Ref.
No.	Name	Details	Church Status before Appointment	New Episcopal Appointment	Date of Episcopal Appointment	Ref.
January 2026
1.	Luís Gonzaga Silva Pepeu O.F.M. Cap.	18 February 1957; Caruaru, Brazil	Archbishop of Vitória da Conquista	Archbishop-Bishop of Baturité	1 January 2026	
2.	Osmany Massó Cuesta	18 December 1976; Santiago de Cuba, Cuba	Priest of the Archdiocese of Santiago de Cuba	Bishop of Santísimo Salvador de Bayamo y Manzanillo	3 January 2026	
3.	Joseph Maluki Mwongela	7 April 1968; Kakumi, Kitui County, Kenya	Bishop of Kitui	Coadjutor Bishop of Machakos	4 January 2026	
4.	Mark Freeman	13 September 1959; Launceston, Tasmania, Australia	Priest of the Archdiocese of Hobart	Bishop of Ballarat	7 January 2026	
5.	John S. Bonnici	17 February 1965; New York, New York, United States	Auxiliary Bishop of New York; Titular Bishop of Arindela	Bishop of Rochester	7 January 2026	
6.	Rumen Stanev	19 August 1979; Kaloyanovo, Bulgaria	Auxiliary Bishop of Sofia–Plovdiv; Titular Bishop of Simidicca	Bishop of Sofia–Plovdiv	7 January 2026	
7.	Marco Aurélio Gubiotti	21 October 1963; Ouro Fino, Minas Gerais, Brazil	Bishop of Itabira–Fabriciano	Archbishop of Juiz de Fora	8 January 2026	
8.	José Roberto Fortes Palau	9 April 1965; Jacareí, São Paulo, Brazil	Bishop of Limeira	Archbishop of Sorocaba	8 January 2026	
9.	Prosper Baltazar Lyimo	20 August 1964; Kyou, Tanzania	Auxiliary Bishop of Arusha; Titular Bishop of Vanariona	Bishop of Bariadi	8 January 2026	
10.	Domenico Basile	3 June 1966; Andria, Italy	Priest of the Diocese of Andria	Bishop of Molfetta-Ruvo-Giovinazzo-Terlizzi	9 January 2026	
11.	Sithembele Anton Sipuka	27 April 1960; Idutywa, South Africa	Bishop of Umtata	Archbishop of Cape Town	9 January 2026	
12.	Felice Accrocca	2 December 1959; Cori, Lazio, Italy	Archbishop of Benevento	Archbishop-Bishop of Assisi-Nocera Umbra-Gualdo Tadino; Archbishop-Bishop of Foligno; In persona episcopi	10 January 2026	
13.	Joseph Francis Badji	1 January 1966; Ziguinchor, Senegal	Priest of the Diocese of Ziguinchor	Coadjutor Bishop of Kolda	10 January 2026	
14.	Mirosław Adamczyk	16 July 1962; Gdańsk, Poland	Apostolic Nuncio to Argentina	Apostolic Nuncio to Albania	14 January 2026	
15.	Giorgio Lingua	23 March 1960; Fossano, Italy	Apostolic Nuncio to Croatia	Apostolic Nuncio to Israel; Apostolic Delegate to Jerusalem and Palestine	22 January 2026	
16.	Cyril Buhayan Villareal	1 March 1974; Mambusao, Philippines	Priest of Archdiocese of Capiz	Bishop of Kalibo	24 January 2026	
17.	Dominic Kimengich	23 April 1961; Kitur, Kenya	Bishop of Eldoret	Coadjutor Archbishop of Mombasa	28 January 2026	
18.	Trinidad Antonio Márquez Guerrero	12 November 1965; San Julián, Jalisco, Mexico	Priest of the Diocese of San Juan de los Lagos	Auxiliary Bishop of San Juan de los Lagos; Titular Bishop of Melzi	28 January 2026	
19.	Relwendé Kisito Ouédraogo	9 April 1972; Gourcy, Burkina Faso	Priest of the Diocese of Ouahigouya	Apostolic Nuncio to Republic of Congo; Titular Bishop of Hilta	28 January 2026	
20.	Andrzej Józwowicz	14 January 1965; Boćki, Poland	Apostolic Nuncio to Iran	Apostolic Nuncio to Sri Lanka	31 January 2026	
21.	Leslie Clifford D’Souza	19 August 1962; Yermal, Karnataka, India	Priest of the Diocese of Udupi	Bishop of Udupi	31 January 2026	
February 2026
22.	Stanislav Přibyl C.Ss.R	16 November 1971; Prague, Czechia	Bishop of Litoměřice	Archbishop of Prague	2 February 2026	
23.	Luis Dario Martín	4 March 1961; General Pico, Argentina	Auxiliary Bishop of Santa Rosa in Argentina; Titular Bishop of Bisenzio	Bishop of Santa Rosa in Argentina	2 February 2026	
24.	Krzysztof Zadarko	2 September 1960 Słupsk, Poland	Auxiliary Bishop of Koszalin–Kołobrzeg Titular Bishop of Cavaillon	Bishop of Koszalin–Kołobrzeg	2 February 2026	
25.	Nelson Po	5 June 1968 Leyte, Philippines	Priest of the Archdiocese of Perth	Auxiliary Bishop of Perth Titular Bishop of Agunto	2 February 2026	
26.	Aldemiro Sena dos Santos	26 June 1964; Ibirataia, Bahia, Brazil	Bishop of Guarabira	Bishop of Teixeira de Freitas–Caravelas	4 February 2026	
27.	Margarito Salazar Cárdenas	22 February 1958; Matamoros, Tamaulipas, Mexico	Bishop of Matehuala	Bishop of Tampico	6 February 2026	
28.	James Robert Golka	22 September 1966; Grand Island, Nebraska, United States	Bishop of Colorado Springs	Archbishop of Denver	7 February 2026	
29.	Relwendé Kisito Ouédraogo	9 April 1972; Gourcy, Burkina Faso	Apostolic Nuncio to Republic of Congo; Titular Bishop of Hilta	Apostolic Nuncio to Gabon	10 February 2026	
30.	Jude Thaddeus Okolo	18 December 1956; Kano, Nigeria	Apostolic Nuncio to Czechia; Titular Bishop of Novica	Apostolic Nuncio to Haiti	11 February 2026	
31.	José Alberto González Juárez	19 December 1967 El Parral, Chiapas, Mexico	Bishop of Tuxtepec	Bishop of Campeche	11 February 2026	
32.	Adolfo Miguel Castaño Fonseca	27 September 1962 San Mateo Mozoquilpan, Mexico, Mexico	Bishop of Azcapotzalco	Bishop of Atlacomulco	11 February 2026	
33.	Martin Laliberté	13 December 1964 Quebec City, Quebec, Canada	Bishop of Trois-Rivières	Coadjutor Bishop of Saint-Jean-Longueuil	11 February 2026	
34.	José Silvio de Brito	26 December 1970; Cruzeta, Rio Grande do Norte, Brazil	Priest of the Archdiocese of Natal	Auxiliary Bishop of Natal; Titular Bishop of Menefessi	12 February 2026	
35.	John Berinyuy Tatah	18 December 1975; Mbuluf-Shisong, Cameroon	Rector of the Catholic University of Cameroon, Bamenda	Auxiliary Bishop of Bamenda; Titular Bishop of Casae Nigrae	13 February 2026	
36.	Rubén Darío Jaramillo Montoya	15 August 1966; Santa Rosa de Cabal, Colombia	Bishop of Buenaventura	Bishop of Montería	14 February 2026	
37.	Francisco Antonio Agnelo Jacinto Pinheiro	6 July 1972 Raia, Goa, India	Priest of Archdiocese of Goa and Daman	Bishop of Sindhudurg	14 February 2026	
38.	Javier Herrera Corona	15 May 1968; Autlán, Jalisco, Mexico	Apostolic Nuncio to Algeria	Apostolic Nuncio to Tunisia	16 February 2026	
39.	Teodoro Mendes Tavares, C.S.Sp.	7 January 1964 Santiago, Cape Verde	Bishop of Ponta de Pedras	Bishop of Santiago de Cabo Verde	16 February 2026	
40.	Amos Mabuti Masemola	5 March 1978; Winterveld, South Africa	Priest of the Archdiocese of Pretoria	Bishop of Kroonstad	17 February 2026	
41.	Gaspard Béby Gnéba	6 January 1963; Tehiri Guitry, Ivory Coast	Bishop of Man	Auxiliary Bishop of Abidjan; Titular Bishop of Putia in Numidia	19 February 2026	
42.	Landry Philippe Rasamison, O.F.M. Cap.	3 May 1972; Ambanja, Madagascar	Priest in the Diocese of Port Victoria	Bishop of Port Victoria	21 February 2026	
43.	Francesco Antonio Soddu	24 October 1959 Chiaramonti, Italy	Bishop of Terni-Narni-Amelia	Archbishop of Sassari	21 February 2026	
44.	Francis Duffy	21 April 1958; Bawnboy, Ireland	Archbishop of Tuam	Bishop of Killala; In persona episcopi	23 February 2026	
45.	Luis Augusto Campos Flórez	23 August 1958; Bogotá, Colombia	Bishop of Socorro y San Gil	Archbishop of Bucaramanga	24 February 2026	
46.	Stefano Sparapani	24 July 1956; Rome, Italy	Priest of the Diocese of Rome	Auxiliary Bishop of Rome; Titular Bishop of Bisenzio	25 February 2026	
47.	Alessandro Zenobbi	10 November 1969; Rome, Italy	Priest of the Diocese of Rome	Auxiliary Bishop of Rome; Titular Bishop of Biccari	25 February 2026	
48.	Andrea Carlevale	8 April 1971; Rome, Italy	Priest of the Diocese of Rome	Auxiliary Bishop of Rome; Titular Bishop of Atella	25 February 2026	
49.	Marco Valenti	28 February 1961; Cantalupo in Sabina, Italy	Priest of the Diocese of Rome	Auxiliary Bishop of Rome; Titular Bishop of Arpi	25 February 2026	
50.	Assandé Darius Ekou	27 April 1968; Bongouanou, Ivory Coast	Priest of the Diocese of Abengourou	Bishop of Agboville	27 February 2026	
51.	Wojciech Załuski	5 April 1960; Załuski-Lipniewo, Poland	Apostolic Nuncio to Malaysia and to East Timor; Apostolic Delegate to Brunei	Apostolic Nuncio to Malta	28 February 2026	
March 2026
52.	Mário Antônio da Silva	17 October 1966; Itararé, Brazil	Archbishop of Cuiabá	Archbishop of Aparecida	2 March 2026	
53.	Sean Buslig Mejia	3 March 1972; Tabuk, Philippines	Priest	Apostolic Vicar of Tabuk	3 March 2026	
54.	Milan Lach SJ	18 November 1973; Kežmarok, Slovakia	Auxiliary Bishop of Bratislava of the Slovaks; Titular Bishop of Ostracine	Bishop of Bratislava of the Slovaks	6 March 2026	
55.	Gabriele Giordano Caccia	24 February 1958; Milan, Italy	Permanent Observer of the Holy See to the United Nations; Titular Archbishop of Sepino	Apostolic Nuncio to the United States	7 March 2026	
56.	Khalid Rehmat OFMCap	5 August 1968; Mianwali, Punjab, Pakistan	Apostolic Vicar of Quetta	Archbishop of Lahore	10 March 2026	
57.	Sebastian Francis Shaw OFM	14 November 1957 Padri-Jo-Goth, Pakistan	Archbishop of Lahore	Apostolic Vicar of Quetta	10 March 2026	
58.	Konrad Krajewski	25 November 1963; Łódź, Poland	Papal Almoner	Archbishop of Łódź	12 March 2026	
59.	Luis Marín de San Martín OSA	21 August 1961 Madrid, Spain	Titular Bishop of Suliana	Titular Archbishop of Suliana	12 March 2026	
60.	Leopoldo Girelli	13 March 1953; Predore, Italy	Apostolic Nuncio to India and Nepal; Titular Archbishop of Capreae	Apostolic Nuncio to Croatia	13 March 2026	
61.	Godfrey Mullen O.S.B.	22 January 1966 Salem, Illinois, United States	Priest of the Archabbey of Saint Meinrad, Indiana	Bishop of Belleville	13 March 2026	
62.	Jefferson Santos Pinheiro	17 July 1976 Propriá, Brazil	Priest of the Archdiocese of Aracaju	Auxiliary Bishop of Aracaju Titular Bishop of Tagaria	13 March 2026	
63.	José Manuel León C.P.	29 October 1966; Barquisimeto, Venezuela	Priest	Auxiliary Bishop of Caracas; Titular Bishop of Gigthi	18 March 2026	
64.	José Dionisio Gómez Gouveia	4 June 1966 La Guaira, Venezuela	Priest of the Archdiocese of Caracas	Auxiliary Bishop of Caracas; Titular Bishop of Fuerteventura	18 March 2026	
65.	Luigi Roberto Cona	10 November 1965; Niscemi, Itay	Apostolic Nuncio to El Salvador	Apostolic Nuncio to Syria	19 March 2026	
66.	Alfonso Bauer S.D.B.	23 July 1968 Montevideo, Uruguay	Priest	Bishop of Florida	19 March 2026	
67.	Noël Bernard Coulibaly	17 December 1976 Niono, Mali	Priest of the Diocese of Sikasso	Bishop of Sikasso	19 March 2026	
68.	Hailemariam Medhin Tesfay S.D.B.	1 October 1973; Alitena, Ethiopia	Priest	Coadjutor Apostolic Vicar of Gambella	21 March 2026	
69.	Manoel de Oliveira Soares Filho	25 September 1965; São Domingos do Capim, Brazil	Bishop of Palmeira dos Índios	Bishop of Castanhal	24 March 2026	
70.	Ángel Antonio Recinos Lemus	2 August 1963 Azulco, Guatemala	Bishop of Zacapa y Santo Cristo de Esquipulas	Bishop of Escuintla	24 March 2026	
71.	Anthony Randazzo	7 October 1966 Sydney, Australia	Bishop of Broken Bay	Archbishop ad personam	25 March 2026	
72.	Renzo Pegoraro	4 June 1959	President of the Pontifical Academy for Life	Titular Archbishop of Gabii	25 March 2026	
73.	Paul Gomes	3 September 1962 Kharbaria, Bangladesh	Priest of the Diocese of Rajshahi	Bishop of Joypurhat	25 March 2026	
74.	Moises Cuevas	25 November 1973 Cuenca, Philippines	Apostolic Vicar of Calapan	Bishop of Calapan	25 March 2026	
75.	Gerardo Fortich Saco Jr.	16 October 1965 Tagbilaran, Philippines	Priest of the Diocese of Tagbilaran	Bishop of Tagbilaran	25 March 2026	
76.	Heiner Wilmer S.C.J.	9 April 1961; Emsland, Germany	Bishop of Hildesheim	Bishop of Münster	26 March 2026	
77.	Obed Muriungi Karobia O.F.M. Conv.	29 June 1979 Kenya	Priest	Auxiliary Bishop of Nairobi Titular Bishop of Timida	26 March 2026	
78.	Edgar Peña Parra	6 March 1960; Maracaibo, Venezuela	Substitute for General Affairs of the Secretariat of State	Apostolic Nuncio to Italy and San Marino	30 March 2026	
April 2026
79.	Daniel Meagher	10 November 1961; West Wyalong, Australia	Auxiliary Bishop of Sydney; Titular Bishop of Pocofeltus	Bishop of Rockhampton	1 April 2026	
80.	Benoît Aubert	30 May 1973; Porto-Vecchio, France	Priest of the Archdiocese of Paris	Bishop of Limoges	8 April 2026	
81.	Hubertus van Megen	4 October 1961; Eygelshoven, Netherlands	Apostolic Nuncio to Kenya	Apostolic Nuncio to Germany	9 April 2026	
82.	Isaac Gaglo	7 October 1958; Kpémé, Togo	Bishop of Aného	Archbishop of Lomé	10 April 2026	
83.	Joseph Ferdinand Guy Boulanger	6 June 1963 Sainte-Cécile-de-Whitton, Quebec, Canada	Bishop of Rouyn-Noranda Bishop of Amos	Archbishop of Sherbrooke	10 April 2026	
84.	Lawrence Ofentse Pheto	12 March 1976 Ramotswa, Botswana	Priest of the Diocese of Gaborone	Bishop of Francistown	10 April 2026	
85.	Claudio Pablo Castricone	16 April 1958 Villa Constitución, Argentina	Auxiliary Bishop of Orán Titular Bishop of Castra Nova	Coadjutor Bishop of Orán	10 April 2026	
86.	Joseph de Metz-Noblat	6 February 1959 Cherbourg, France	Bishop of Langres	Bishop of Verdun	11 April 2026	
87.	Rene Ramirez RCJ	29 March 1969; Gapan, Philippines	Auxiliary Bishop of Melbourne; Titular Bishop of Mauriana	Bishop of Sandhurst	11 April 2026	
88.	Patrick Ngwenya	1 February 1967 Mutare, Zimbabwe	Priest of the Archdiocese of Harare	Bishop of Chinhoyi	11 April 2026	
89.	John Baptist Nguyễn Quốc Hưng	12 January 1969 Buôn Ma Thuột, Vietnam	Priest of the Diocese of Ban Mê Thuôt	Coadjutor Bishop of Quy Nhon	11 April 2026	
90.	John Baptist Nguyễn Quang Tuyến	26 May 1969 Ho Chi Minh City, Vietnam	Priest of the Archdiocese of Ho Chi Minh City	Auxiliary Bishop of Ho Chi Minh City Titular Bishop of Perdices	11 April 2026	
91.	Amel Shamon Nona	1 November 1967; Alqosh, Iraq	Archbishop-Bishop of Saint Thomas the Apostle of Sydney (Chaldean)	Patriarch of Baghdad (Chaldean)	12 April 2026	
92.	Motlatsi Meshack Phomane	14 November 1975; Tshenola, South Africa	Priest of the Diocese of Umtata	Bishop of Bethlehem	14 April 2026	
93.	Jean-Marie Vianney Musul Masas	23 August 1974; Fungurume, DR Congo	Priest of the Archdiocese of Lubumbashi	Auxiliary Bishop of Lubumbashi; Titular Bishop of Satafis	15 April 2026	
94.	Michele Morandi	30 March 1976; Alfonsine, Italy	Priest of the Diocese of Faenza–Modigliana	Bishop of Faenza–Modigliana	18 April 2026	
95.	Nicolás Gregorio Nava Rojas	8 December 1963 Maracaibo, Venezuela	Bishop of Machiques	Bishop of Cabimas	18 April 2026	
96.	Augusto Mascagna	12 March 1964; Caprarola, Italy	Priest of the Diocese of Civita Castellana	Bishop of Pescia; Bishop of Pistoia	20 April 2026	
97.	Daniel Miehm	27 August 1960; Kitchener, Canada	Bishop of Peterborough	Bishop of London	21 April 2026	
98.	Giancarlo Dellagiovanna	18 September 1961; Voghera, Italy	Apostolic Nuncio Emeritus to Burkina Faso	Apostolic Nuncio to El Salvador	25 April 2026	
99.	Wojciech Załuski	5 April 1960; Załuski-Lipniewo, Poland	Apostolic Nuncio to Malta	Apostolic Nuncio to Libya	25 April 2026	
100.	Dennis Kofi Agbenyadzi SMA	9 October 1964 Kadjebi, Ghana	Bishop of Berbérati	Archbishop of Berbérati	25 April 2026	
101.	Joseph Samedi S.J.	20 December 1971 Mongoumba, Central African Republic	Superior of the Society of Jesus in Bangui	Coadjutor Archbishop of Bangui	25 April 2026	
102.	José Magdaleno Álvarez Briceño	2 July 1971 Carache, Venezuela	Priest of the Diocese of Trujillo	Bishop of Guasdualito	25 April 2026	
May 2026
103.	Dagoberto Campos Salas	14 March 1966; Puntarenas, Costa Rica	Apostolic Nuncio to Panama; Titular Archbishop of Forontoniana	Apostolic Nuncio to Ecuador	1 May 2026	
104.	Evelio Menjivar-Ayala	14 August 1970 Chalatenango, El Salvador	Auxiliary Bishop of Washington Titular Bishop of Aëtus	Bishop of Wheeling–Charleston	1 May 2026	
105.	Gary Studniewski	8 May 1957 Toledo, Ohio, United States	Priest of the Archdiocese of Washington	Auxiliary Bishop of Washington Titular Bishop of Jamestown	1 May 2026	
106.	Robert P. Boxie	12 September 1980 Lake Charles, Louisiana, United States	Priest of the Archdiocese of Washington	Auxiliary Bishop of Washington Titular Bishop of Cataquas	1 May 2026	
107.	John Jairo Gomez	15 December 1975 Santa Rosa de Cabal, Colombia	Priest of the Diocese of Tyler	Bishop of Laredo	1 May 2026	
108.	Roch Martin	26 September 1964 Sturgeon Falls, Ontario, Canada	Priest of the Diocese of Sault Sainte Marie	Bishop of Timmins	1 May 2026	
109.	Nick Vaquilar	3 May 1970; Cabugao, Philippines	Priest of the Archdiocese of Nueva Segovia	Bishop of Urdaneta	3 May 2026	
110.	Rubén de la Cruz Martínez	4 May 1966; San Francisco del Rincón, Mexico	Priest of the Archdiocese of León	Auxiliary Bishop of León; Titular Bishop of Teudali	4 May 2026	
111.	Ramón Orozco Muñoz	15 July 1973 San Agustín, Mexico	Priest of the Diocese of San Juan de los Lagos	Auxiliary Bishop of León; Titular Bishop of Tiguala	4 May 2026	
112.	Michael T. Castori S.J.	21 October 1960; Sacramento, California, United States	Rector of the Arrupe Jesuit Residence in Seattle	Bishop of Honolulu	6 May 2026	
113.	Peter Suphot Roeksujarit	2 November 1961; Ayutthaya, Thailand	Priest of the Archdiocese of Bangkok	Bishop of Chiang Mai	7 May 2026	
114.	Cristino Ramos González	16 November 1975; Arroyos y Esteros, Paraguay	Priest of the Diocese of San Pedro	Bishop of Concepción en Paraguay	8 May 2026	
115.	Vijaya Paul Reddy Duggimpudi	8 January 1965; Manugonda, India	Priest of the Diocese of Warangal	Bishop of Warangal	9 May 2026	
116.	Linus Ngenomesho O.M.I.	22 August 1969; Omatando, Namibia	Apostolic Administrator of Rundu	Apostolic Vicar of Rundu	11 May 2026	
117.	Homero Marín Arboleda C.M.	17 November 1959; Circasia, Colombia	Vincentian priest	Apostolic Vicar of Tierradentro	12 May 2026	
118.	John Alphonse Asiedu S.V.D.	12 May 1962 Adeemmra, Ghana	Apostolic Vicar of Donkorkrom	Bishop of Donkorkrom	12 May 2026	
119.	Michele Autuoro	27 December 1966; Procida, Italy	Auxiliary Bishop of Naples; Titular Bishop of Passo Corese	Archbishop of Benevento	13 May 2026	
120.	Emilio Biosca Agüero O.F.M. Cap.	15 December 1964 Fairfax, Virginia, United States	Priest of the Archdiocese of Washington	Bishop of Venice in Florida	13 May 2026	
121.	Edilson Soares Nobre	9 May 1965 Touros, Rio Grande do Norte, Brazil	Bishop of Oeiras	Bishop of Guarabira	13 May 2026	
122.	Simon Peter Kamomoe	26 November 1962 Gatundu, Kenya	Auxiliary Bishop of Wote Titular Bishop of Thubunae in Numidia	Bishop of Wote	13 May 2026	
123.	José Guadalupe Torres Campos	19 January 1960 León, Mexico	Bishop of Ciudad Juárez	Bishop of Ecapetec	13 May 2026	
124.	Aguia Jean Martial Arnaud Kouamé	26 March 1977 Abidjan, Ivory Coast	Priest	Auxiliary Bishop of Abidjan Titular Bishop of Sutunurca	13 May 2026	
125.	Tomasz Grysa	16 October 1970; Poznań, Poland	Apostolic Nuncio to Madagascar, Mauritius and Seychelles; Apostolic Delegate to Comoros	Apostolic Nuncio to Uganda	14 May 2026	
126.	Michael Banach	19 November 1962 Worcester, Massachusetts, US	Apostolic Nuncio to Hungary	Apostolic Nuncio to Argentina	14 May 2026	
127.	Giampaolo Dianin	29 October 1962 Teolo, Italy	Bishop of Chioggia	Archbishop of Gorizia	14 May 2026	
128.	Louie Galbines	18 November 1966 Sagay, Negros Occidental, Philippines	Bishop of Kabankalan	Bishop of Bacolod	14 May 2026	
129.	Miguel Angel Nguema Bee S.D.B.	13 July 1969 Bata, Equatorial Guinea	Bishop of Ebebiyín	Bishop of Bata	14 May 2026	
130.	Patricio Larrosa Martos	21 January 1960; Huéneja, Spain	Priest of the Diocese of Guadix	Bishop of Danlí	15 May 2026	
131.	Fabrício do Prado Nunes	14 February 1978; São Gabriel, Brazil	Priest of the Diocese of Bagé	Auxiliary Bishop of the Military Ordinariate of Brazil; Titular Bishop of Tadamata	20 May 2026	
132.	Cesare Di Pietro	12 March 1964; Messina, Italy	Auxiliary Bishop of Messina-Lipari-Santa Lucia del Mela; Titular Bishop of Nicopolis ad Iaterum	Bishop of Locri-Gerace	23 May 2026	
133.	Santiago de Wit Guzmán	5 September 1964; Valencia, Spain	Apostolic Nuncio to Trinidad and Tobago, Antigua and Barbuda, Belize, Grenada, Guyana, Saint Kitts and Nevis, Saint Vincent and Grenadines, Suriname, Bahamas, Barbados, Dominica, Jamaica and Saint Lucia and Apostolic Delegate to Antilles	Apostolic Nuncio to the Netherlands	25 May 2026	
134.	Eugene Nugent	21 October 1958 Scarriff, Ireland	Apostolic Nuncio to Bahrain, Kuwait and Qatar	Apostolic Nuncio to Czechia	25 May 2026	
135.	Arnulfo Moreno Quiñonez	25 March 1979 El Charco, Colombia	Priest of the Apostolic Vicariate of Guapi	Auxiliary Bishop of Cali Titular Bishop of Castra nova	25 May 2026	
136.	Luis Fernando de Jesús Pérez Agudelo	21 September 1967 Itagüí, Colombia	Priest of the Archdiocese of Medellín	Auxiliary Bishop of Cali Titular Bishop of Leges	25 May 2026	
137.	Francisco Castro Lalupú	13 August 1973 Bellavista-Sullana, Peru	Auxiliary Bishop of Trujillo Titular Bishop of Putia in Byzacena	Bishop-Prelate of Caravelí	25 May 2026	
138.	Anthony James Corcoran S.J.	19 April 1963 Tucson, Arizona, United States	Apostolic Administrator of Kyrgyzstan	Titular Bishop of Aëtus	25 May 2026	
139.	Simon Jong-Gang Kim	2 January 1965; Cheongju, South Korea	Bishop of Cheongju	Coadjutor Archbishop of Daegu	26 May 2026	
140.	Bernardino Ne Ne	20 May 1970 Loikaw, Myanmar	Priest of the Diocese of Loikaw	Coadjutor Bishop of Taungngu	26 May 2026	
141.	John Mbua Mwandi	24 September 1970; Kenya	Priest of the Diocese of Kitui	Bishop of Kitui	27 May 2026	
142.	Kenneth Thorson O.M.I.	19 September 1966; Saskatoon, Canada	Priest	Bishop of Prince Albert	28 May 2026	
June 2026
143.	Jeannot Martial Andrianandrainy	13 January 1976; Befelatanana, Madagascar	Priest of the Diocese of Antsirabé	Auxiliary Bishop of Morondava; Titular Bishop of Elephantaria in Mauretania	3 June 2026	
144.	Przemysław Tomasz Szulc	2 June 1978; Chojnice, Poland	Priest of the Diocese of Pelplin	Auxiliary Bishop of Pelplin; Titular Bishop of Cufruta	11 June 2026	
145.	Tesfaye Tadesse Gebresilasie M.C.C.J.	22 September 1969; Harar, Ethiopia	Auxiliary Bishop of Addis Abeba; Titular Bishop of Cleopatris	Archbishop of Addis Abeba (Ethiopian)	12 June 2026	
146.	Andrés Napoleón Romero Cárdenas	24 July 1967 Ramonal Arriba, Dominican Republic	Bishop of Barahona	Bishop of La Vega	12 June 2026	
147.	Wacław Grądalski	25 December 1964 Gorlice, Poland	Priest of the Diocese of Koszalin–Kołobrzeg	Auxiliary Bishop of Koszalin–Kołobrzeg; Titular Bishop of Hadrumetum	12 June 2026	
148.	Elímar Gerardo Carvajal Durán	6 June 1976; Grecia, Costa Rica	Priest of the Diocese of Alajuela	Bishop of Puntarenas	20 June 2026	
149.	Rubén Antonio González Medina C.M.F.	17 November 1967; Villalba, Puerto Rico, United States	Priest of the Diocese of Ponce	Bishop of Ponce	24 June 2026	
150.	Krzysztof Chudzio	25 June 1963 Przemyśl, Poland	Auxiliary Bishop of Przemyśl Titular Bishop of Marazanæ	Coadjutor Bishop of Rzeszów	24 June 2026	
151.	Anand David Xalxo	20 November 1975 Mandar, India	Priest of the Archdiocese of Ranchi	Auxiliary Bishop of Ranchi Titular Bishop of Thinisa in Numidia	24 June 2026	
152.	Johannes Zehe	28 October 1963 Neustrelitz, Germany	Priest of the Archdiocese of Hamburg	Auxiliary Bishop of Hamburg Titular Bishop of Aquæ Sirenses	24 June 2026	
153.	Edmond Yawo Amekuse	16 November 1967; Agou-Akoumahou, Togo	Priest of the Diocese of Kpalimé	Bishop of Kpalimé	27 June 2026	
154.	Anton Ranjith Pillainayagam	23 September 1966; Jaffna, Sri Lanka	Auxiliary Bishop of Colombo; Titular Bishop of Materiana	Bishop of Jaffna	29 June 2026	
155.	Jaime Uriel Sanabria Arias	17 April 1970 Ciénaga-Boyacá, Colombia	Apostolic Vicar of San Andrés y Providencia	Bishop of Yopal	29 June 2026	
July 2026
156.	Walter Erbì	8 January 1968; Turin, Italy	Apostolic Nuncio to Liberia, Sierra Leone and Gambia	Apostolic Nuncio to Indonesia	1 July 2026	
157.	Stephen Wang	8 November 1966; London, United Kingdom	Priest of the Archdiocese of Wesminster	Bishop of Arundel and Brighton	2 July 2026	
158.	Stuart Russell Hall	21 August 1962; Melbourne, Australia	Priest of the Archdiocese of Melbourne	Military Ordinary of Australia	3 July 2026	
159.	Ramiro Ernesto Landaverde Orellana	18 May 1976; Chalatenango, El Salvador	Priest of the Diocese of Chalatenango	Bishop of Zacatecoluca	6 July 2026	
160.	Christian Würtz	31 May 1971; Karlsruhe, Germany	Auxiliary Bishop of Freiburg; Titular Bishop of Germania in Dacia	Bishop of Eichstätt	7 July 2026	
161.	Michael Kwiatkowski	21 November 1961; Hamiota, Manitoba, Canada	Bishop of New Westminster of the Ukrainians	Archbishop of Winnipeg of the Ukrainians	9 July 2026	
162.	Juan Carlos Morante Buchhammer S.J.	25 January 1958; Piura, Peru	Priest	Apostolic Vicar of Jaén in Peru	9 July 2026	
163.	Josef Grünwidl	31 January 1963; Hollabrunn, Austria	Archbishop of Vienna	Ordinary of Austria of the Eastern Rite	11 July 2026	
164.	Vincent Lawrence Mpwaji	5 June 1978 Morogoro, Tanzania	Priest of the Archdiocese of Dar-es-Salaam	Auxiliary Bishop of Dar-es-Salaam Titular Bishop of Tacarata	11 July 2026	
165.	Diego Luis Rendón Urrea	3 June 1967; Rionegro, Colombia	Priest of the Diocese of Santa Rosa de Osos	Bishop of Jericó	13 July 2026	
166.	Vitorino José Pereira Soares	19 October 1960; Penafiel, Portugal	Auxiliary Bishop of Porto; Titular Bishop of Gisipa	Bishop of Faro	14 July 2026	
167.	Bonaventure Bosco Gubazire M. Afr.	3 March 1974; Kitumba, Uganda	Rector of the St. Martin of Tours Formation House in Ejisu, Ghana	Bishop of Kabale	15 July 2026	
168.	Jean Miguina O.F.M. Cap.	12 September 1978; Laï, Chad	Priest	Bishop of Sarh	16 July 2026	
169.	Michael Router	15 April 1965 Virginia, Ireland	Auxiliary Bishop of Armagh Titular Bishop of Lugmad	Bishop of Derry	16 July 2026	
170.	Albert Hemrom	27 February 1970 Konapathar, Assam, India	Bishop of Dibrugarh	Coadjutor Archbishop of Guwahati	16 July 2026	
171.	Joseph Chang Yanfeng	4 April 1984; Beizhen, China	Priest of the Diocese of Chifeng	Bishop of Chifeng	22 July 2026	
172.	Juan de Dios Peña Rojas	8 August 1967; Acequias, Venezuela	Bishop of El Vigía–San Carlos del Zulia	Bishop of Barinas	29 July 2026	
173.	Francis Xavier Duan Yongkun	6 December 1980 Hangjin Houqi, China	Priest	Coadjutor Bishop of Bameng	29 July 2026	
174.	Eustache Ntamwe Makoyo	14 February 1974 Musoshi, DR Congo	Priest of the Diocese of Kabinda	Bishop of Kabinda	29 July 2026	
175.	Gerard Nash	27 February 1959 Tulla, Ireland	Bishop of Ferns	Bishop of Ossory In persona episcopi	29 July 2026	
August 2026
176.	Eusebio Ramos Morales	15 December 1952; Maunabo, Puerto Rico, United States	Bishop of Caguas	Archbishop of San Juan	6 August 2026	
177.	Terentiy Tsapchuk O.S.B.M.	21 July 1980 Chortovets, Ukraine	Priest	Auxiliary Bishop of Bučač of the Ukrainians Titular Bishop of Orea	6 August 2026	
178.	Piotr Pytlowany	7 May 1969; Brzozów, Poland	Priest of the Archdiocese of Przemyśl	Bishop of Karaganda	10 August 2026	
179.	Angelo Accattino	31 July 1966; Asti, Italy	Apostolic Nuncio to Tanzania; Titular Archbishop of Sebana	Apostolic Nuncio to Colombia	15 August 2026	
180.	Gábor Pintér	9 March 1964 Kunszentmárton, Hungary	Apostolic Nuncio to New Zealand, Cook Islands, Fiji, Kiribati, Marshall Islands, Micronesia, Nauru, Palau, Samoa and Vanuatu Apostolic Delegate to the Pacific Ocean	Apostolic Nuncio to Tonga	15 August 2026	
181.	Mariusz Kasperski O.M.I.	15 August 1963; Wolsztyn, Poland	Priest	Auxiliary Bishop of Toamasina; Titular Bishop of Burca	19 August 2026	
182.	Paweł Janusz Kubiak O.M.I.	8 February 1974; Turek, Poland	Priest	Ecclesiastical Superior of Turkmenistan	22 August 2026	
183.	Thomas Animoottil	13 January 1962; Payyavoor, India	Priest of the Archeparchy of Kottayam	Auxiliary Bishop of Kottayam (Syro-Malabar)	27 August 2026	
184.	Sharbel Maroun	6 January 1962; Kfarselwan, Lebanon	Priest of the Eparchy of Our Lady of Lebanon of Los Angeles (Maronite)	Archbishop of Damascus (Maronite)	28 August 2026	
185.	Georgios Altouvas	28 September 1973 Athens, Greece	Archbishop of Corfu–Zakynthos–Kefalonia	Bishop of Santorini Bishop of Syros and Milos Archbishop ad personam	28 August 2026	
186.	Gabriel Narciso Escobar Ayala S.D.B.	18 June 1971 Asunción, Paraguay	Apostolic Vicar of Chaco Paraguayo	Auxiliary Bishop of Asunción	28 August 2026	
187.	Lizardo Estrada Herrera O.S.A.	23 September 1973; Cotabambas, Peru	Auxiliary Bishop of Cusco	Coadjutor Archbishop of Cusco	29 August 2026	
188.	Jean Abou Charouche S.M.S.P.	18 October 1972; Chiyah, Lebanon	Apostolic Administrator of Argentina (Greek-Melkite)	Apostolic Exarch of Argentina (Greek-Melkite); Titular Bishop of Myra of the Greek-Melkites	31 August 2026	
189.	Paul Liu Honggang	2 November 1970 Wufuying, China	Priest of the Diocese of Datong	Bishop of Datong	31 August 2026	
September 2026
190.	Jean-Pierre Sander Louis-Jean	17 Octobeer 1967; Jérémie, Haiti	Auxiliary Bishop of Port-au-Prince; Titular Bishop of Privata	Bishop of Fort-Liberté	1 September 2026	
191.	Ferenc Palánki	11 March 1964; Balassagyarmat, Hungary	Bishop of Debrecen–Nyíregyháza	Archbishop of Kalocsa–Kecskemét	3 September 2026	
192.	Serhii Kippa O.F.M. Cap.	12 December 1978; Voznesensk, Ukraine	Superior of the Custody of the Friars Minor Capuchin of Ukraine	Auxiliary Bishop of Kyiv-Zhytomyr; Titular Bishop of Marazane	4 September 2026	
193.	Gerardo Antonio Vargas Cruz O.F.M.	2 December 1976; Mayagüez, Puerto Rico, United States	Episcopal vicar for the clergy of the Archdiocese of San Juan de Puerto Rico	Coadjutor Bishop of Fajardo–Humacao	8 September 2026	
194.	Júlio César Gomes Moreira	18 April 1972 Fortaleza, Brazil	Auxiliary Bishop of Belo Horizonte Titular Bishop of Thisiduo	Bishop of Rubiataba–Mozarlândia	8 September 2026	
195.	José Paulino Francisco Neto	30 August 1972 Comercinho, Brazil	Priest of the Diocese of Araçuaí	Bishop of Porto Nacional	8 September 2026	
196.	Andrew Ding Yang	16 September 1981 Hechuan, Chongqing, China	Priest of the Archdiocese of Chongqing	Archbishop of Chongqing	8 September 2026	
197.	Crispin Varquez	5 December 1960; Sevilla, Philippines	Bishop of Borongan	Bishop of Tagbilaran	10 September 2026	
198.	Mario León Dorado O.M.I.	16 March 1974; Madrid, Spain	Apostolic Prefect of Western Sahara	Coadjutor Archbishop of Rabat	12 September 2026	
199.	Pedro Luis Fuentes Valencia C.P.	7 June 1968; La Paz, Bolivia	Auxiliary Bishop of La Paz; Titular Bishop of Temuniana	Military Ordinary of Bolivia	14 September 2026	
200.	Michael A. Saporito	3 May 1962; Newar, New Jersey, United States	Auxiliary Bishop of Newark; Titular Bishop of Luperciana	Bishop of Metuchen	15 September 2026	
201.	Alfonso Raimo	2 July 1959 Calabritto, Italy	Auxiliary Bishop of Salerno–Campagna–Acerno Titular Bishop of Termini Imerese	Bishop of Terni–Narni–Amelia	15 September 2026	
202.	Michele Di Tolve	19 May 1963; Milan, Italy	Auxiliary Bishop of Rome; Titular Bishop of Orrea	Bishop of Chioggia	16 September 2026	
203.	Brendan J. Cahill	28 November 1963; Coral Gables, Florida, United States	Bishop of Victoria in Texas	Bishop of Joliet	17 September 2026	
204.	Antonio Fontinele de Melo	9 May 1968; Camocim, Brazil	Bishop of Humaitá	Bishop of Rio Branco	18 September 2026	
205.	Jorge Carlos Patrón Wong	3 January 1958; Mérida, Yucatán, Mexico	Archbishop of Xalapa	Archbishop of Puebla de los Ángeles	21 September 2026	
206.	Víctor Alejandro Aguilar Ledesma	5 April 1965 San Guillermo, Mexico	Bishop of Celaya	Bishop of Querétaro	21 September 2026	
207.	Sílvio Pereira Castro	4 February 1968; Cianorte, Brazil	Priest of the Diocese of São Miguel Paulista	Auxiliary Bishop of São Miguel Paulista; Titular Bishop of Mauriana	23 September 2026	
208.	Giovanni Crippa I.M.C.	6 October 1958; Besana in Brianza, Italy	Bishop of Ilhéus	Bishop of Palmeira dos Índios	25 September 2026	
209.	Ramón Salazar Estrada	17 May 1963; Guadalajara, Mexico	Auxiliary Bishop of Guadalajara; Titular Bishop of Bisarcio	Bishop of Mazatlán	29 September 2026	
210.	Héctor López Alvarado	13 December 1970 Guadalajara, Mexico	Auxiliary Bishop of Guadalajara; Titular Bishop of Sereddeli	Bishop of Puerto Escondido	29 September 2026	
211.	Pierre Goudreault	27 May 1963 Rouyn-Noranda, Canada	Bishop of Sainte-Anne-de-la-Pocatière	Bishop of Trois-Rivières	29 September 2026	
October 2026
212.	Mauro Gambetti OFM Conv.	27 October 1965; Castel San Pietro Terme, Italy	Archpriest for Saint Peter's Basilica	Archbishop of Chieti–Vasto	3 October 2026	
213.	Grzegorz Piotr Bielaszka	4 August 1974; Szczucin, Poland	Priest of the Diocese of Tarnów	Apostolic Nuncio to United Arab Emirates; Titular Archbishop of Tiburnia	5 October 2026	
214.	Jan Romeo Pawłowski	23 November 1960; Biskupiec, Poland	Apostolic Nuncio to Greece; Titular Archbishop of Sejny	Apostolic Nuncio to Ireland	7 October 2026	
215.	Giorgio Ferretti	27 November 1967; Genoa, Italy	Archbishop of Foggia–Bovino	Bishop of Lucera–Troia; In persona episcopi	9 October 2026	
216.	Timothy Menezes	18 July 1970; Birmingham, United Kingdom	Auxiliary Bishop of Birmingham; Titular Bishop of Thugga	Bishop of Brentwood	10 October 2026	
217.	Carlos Tomás Morel Diplán	2 November 1969; Monte de la Jagua, Dominican Republic	Archbishop of Santo Domingo	Military Ordinary of Dominican Republic	12 October 2026	
218.	Milad Yaghi M.L.	20 June 1964 Lebanon	Priest of the Eparchy of Our Lady of Lebanon of Los Angeles (Maronite)	Bishop of the Eparchy of Our Lady of the Martyrs of Lebanon (Maronite)	12 October 2026	
219.	Francisco Cota de Oliveira	5 August 1969; Onça de Pitangui, Brazil	Bishop of Sete Lagoas	Bishop of Itabira–Fabriciano	13 October 2026	
220.	Miguel Ángel Martínez Méndez	5 May 1959 Yupiltepeque, Guatemala	Apostolic Vicar of Izabal	Coadjutor Bishop of Huehuetenango	13 October 2026	
221.	Marek Forgáč	21 January 1974; Košice, Slovakia	Auxiliary Bishop of Košice; Titular Bishop of Seleuciana	Archbishop of Košice	14 October 2026	
222.	Wellington Tadeu de Queiroz Vieira	11 July 1968 Tocantinópolis, Brazil	Bishop of Cristalândia	Archbishop of Cuiabá	14 October 2026	
223.	Paolo Andreolli S.X.	16 December 1972; Noventa Vicentina, Italy	Auxiliary Bishop of Belém do Pará; Titular Archbishop of Altava	Bishop of Ponta de Pedras	15 October 2026	
224.	Ignatius Ding Zuyao	August 1986 Qidong, China	Priest	Bishop of Haimen	15 October 2026	
225.	Claudiu-Lucian Pop	22 July 1972; Pișcolt, Romania	Major Archbishop of Făgăraș and Alba Iulia	Bishop of Cluj-Gherla (Romanian); In persona episcopi	15 October 2026	
226.	Fernando Murga Gómez	25 May 1965; Bilbao, Spain	Priest of the Archdiocese of Madrid	Auxiliary Bishop of Madrid; Titular Bishop of Thasbalta	16 October 2026	
227.	Andrés Martínez Esteban	17 December 1971 Madrid, Spain	Priest of the Archdiocese of Madrid	Auxiliary Bishop of Madrid; Titular Bishop of Temuniana	16 October 2026	
228.	Eduard Daher	23 April 1973; Qaa, Lebanon	Archbishop of Tripoli (Melkite)	Archbishop of Petra and Philadelphia in Amman (Melkite)	17 October 2026	
229.	Leandro Machado Silvestre	7 April 1978; Itaquaquecetuba, Brazil	Priest of the Diocese of Mogi das Cruzes	Bishop of Guajará-Mirim	21 October 2026	
230.	Martial Bernard	26 January 1978; Bourg-la-Reine, France	Priest of the Diocese of Évry-Corbeil-Essonnes	Bishop of Soissons, Laon and Saint-Quentin	31 October 2026	
November 2026
231.	Carlos José de Oliveira	17 October 1967; Botucatu, Brazil	Bishop of Apucarana	Bishop of Limeira	4 November 2026	
232.	Ramón Duarte Miranda	6 January 1969 Las Pilas, Mexico	Priest of the Archdiocese of Guadalajara	Auxiliary Bishop of Guadalajara Titular Bishop of Sereddeli	4 November 2026	
233.	Héctor Michel Figueroa	19 February 1970 Guadalajara, Mexico	Priest of the Archdiocese of Guadalajara	Auxiliary Bishop of Guadalajara Titular Bishop of Taparura	4 November 2026	
234.	Franco Coppola	31 March 1957; Maglie, Italy	Apostolic Nuncio to Belgium and Luxembourg	Apostolic Nuncio to Hungary	5 November 2026	
235.	Juan Gabriel Díaz Ruiz	14 November 1960; Camagüey, Cuba	Bishop of Matanzas	Archbishop of Santiago de Cuba	7 November 2026	
236.	Víctor Luís Quematcha O.F.M.	27 April 1967 Cúmura, Guinea-Bissau	Bishop of Bafatá	Bishop of Bissau	7 November 2026	
237.	Pierre Jubinville C.S.Sp.	5 August 1960 Ottawa, Canada	Bishop of San Pedro	Bishop of San Lorenzo	7 November 2026	
238.	Abel Apigo	21 May 1968; Calinan, Philippines	Bishop of Mati	Archbishop of Davao	9 November 2026	
239.	Peter Beňo	2 September 1972; Bánovce nad Bebravou, Slovakia	Auxiliary Bishop of Nitra; Titular Bishop of Amudarsa	Bishop of Žilina	10 November 2026	
240.	Octavi Vila Mayo O. Cist.	11 December 1961; Tarragona, Spain	Bishop of Girona	Archbishop of Barcelona	11 November 2026	
241.	Joseph Mashaka Triphon C.S.Sp.	15 January 1962 Tanzania	Priest	Bishop of Nzega	11 November 2026	
242.	Maximilian Francis Buluma	29 October 1976 Tanzania	Priest of the Archdiocese of Mwanza	Auxiliary Bishop of Mwanza Titular Bishop of Puppi	11 November 2026	
243.	Martin Boucar Tine S.S.S.	16 September 1966; Thiès region, Senegal	Bishop of Kaolack	Bishop of Thiès	12 November 2026	
244.	Enrico Valentino Parry	28 December 1968 Oudtshoorn, South Africa	Priest of the Diocese of Oudtshoorn	Bishop of Keimoes–Upington	12 November 2026	
245.	Wayne Lobsinger	1 December 1966; Kitchener, Ontario, Canada	Auxiliary Bishop of Hamilton; Titular Bishop of Gemellæ in Numidia	Bishop of Peterborough	13 November 2026	
246.	Joseph Onyango Oduor O.S.A.	2 May 1977 Ukwala, Kenya	Priest	Coadjutor Bishop of Kisii	13 November 2026	
247.	Waldemar Stanisław Sommertag	6 February 1968; Więcbork, Poland	Apostolic Nuncio to Senegal, Cabo Verde, Guinea-Bissau and Mauritania; Titular Bishop of Traiectum ad Mosam	Apostolic Nuncio to India	14 November 2026	
248.	Joseph Obanyi Sagwe	10 March 1967; Nyamira County, Kenya	Bishop of Kakamega	Archbishop of Eldoret	14 November 2026	
249.	Oswaldo Enrique Méndez Marchena	29 June 1967 Boconó, Venezuela	Priest of the Archdiocese of Barquisimeto	Auxiliary Bishop of Barquisimeto Titular Bishop of Altava	14 November 2026	
250.	Joseph Liu Heng-ping	24 July 1972; Zhangzhou, China	Priest of the Diocese of Xiamen	Bishop of Xiamen	18 November 2026	
251.	Javier Domingo Fernández González	7 July 1973; Caracas, Venezuela	Head of Protocol of the Secretariat of State	Apostolic Nuncio to Liberia and Sierra Leone; Titular Archbishop of Diana	21 November 2026	
252.	Gerry Gamaliel Sebastian Delos Reyes O.M.I.	14 August 1964; Cotabato City, Philippines	Provincial superior of the Philippines of the Congregation of Missionary Oblates of Mary Immaculate	Apostolic Vicar of Jolo	21 November 2026	
253.	Aurelio García Macías	28 March 1965; Pollos, Spain	Titular Bishop of Rotdon	Titular Archbishop of Rotdon	21 November 2026	
254.	Paul Tighe	12 February 1958; Navan, Ireland	Titular Bishop of Drivastum	Titular Archbishop of Drivastum	21 November 2026	
255.	Stéphane Duteutre	17 October 1967; Clermont-Ferrand, France	Priest of the Archdiocese of Paris	Bishop of Saint-Étienne	21 November 2026	
