= Terzolle =

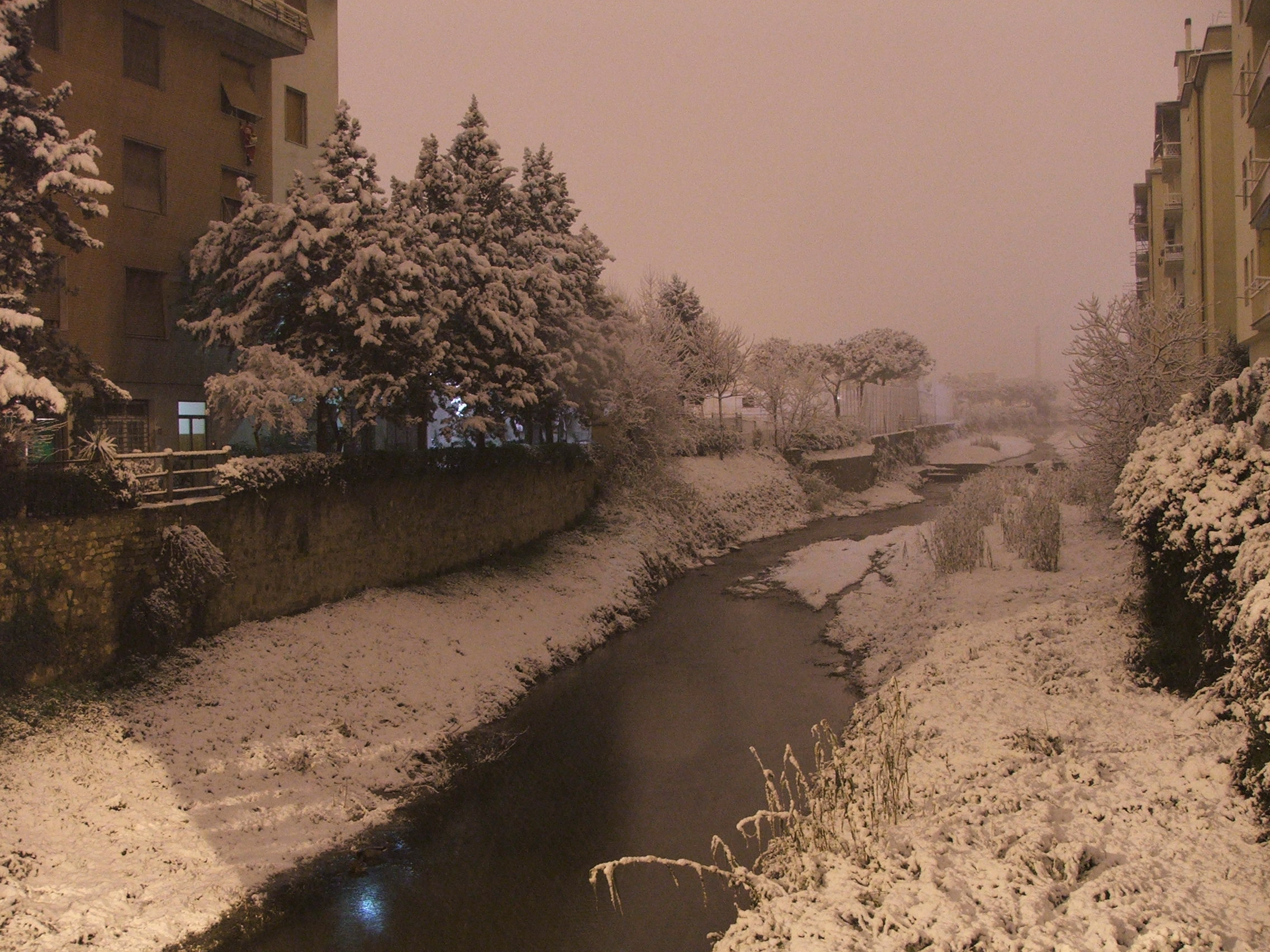

Location
- Country: Italy
- Region: Tuscany

Physical characteristics
- Source
  - location: Near Cercina
- Mouth: Mugnone stream
  - coordinates: 43°47′22.63″N 11°13′50.02″E

Basin features
- Tributaries
  - right: Terzollina

The Terzolle stream in origin was a tributary of the Arno stream, now it's a tributary of Mugnone stream (that in turn is a tributary of the Arno river); it makes its short journey in the area of Florence.

Its source is located near Cercina, a few kilometers north of the Tuscan capital. After a journey of about one and a half kilometers, in the mill at the height of the small inhabited center of Serpiolle, the Terzolle joins the small Terzollina stream. Two streets have been dedicated where these two small streams meet: via del Mulino and via Nuova del Mulino.

The Terzolle then crosses the Rifredi district, which derives its name from the cold water of the Terzolle (which was called Rio freddo), which in winter reach really low temperatures (5-6 °C). After crossing the Ponte di Mezzo, the Terzolle joins the Mugnone, at the height of the Ponte di San Donato. The watercourse continues keeping the name of Mugnone up to the confluence of the Arno river, at the height of the Ponte all'Indiano. Originally the Terzolle flowed into the Arno at a point near the present Ponte alla Vittoria.

Today we are witnessing the environmental degradation of the city stretch of the stream: the lack of care for the waters of the Terzolle risks irreversibly damaging that stream that has characterized the life of the Rifredi district, which for many years had to defend itself from the floods of the stream.

The name Terzolle is of Roman origin since at the time of Roman Florentia it was located at the third mile to the north.

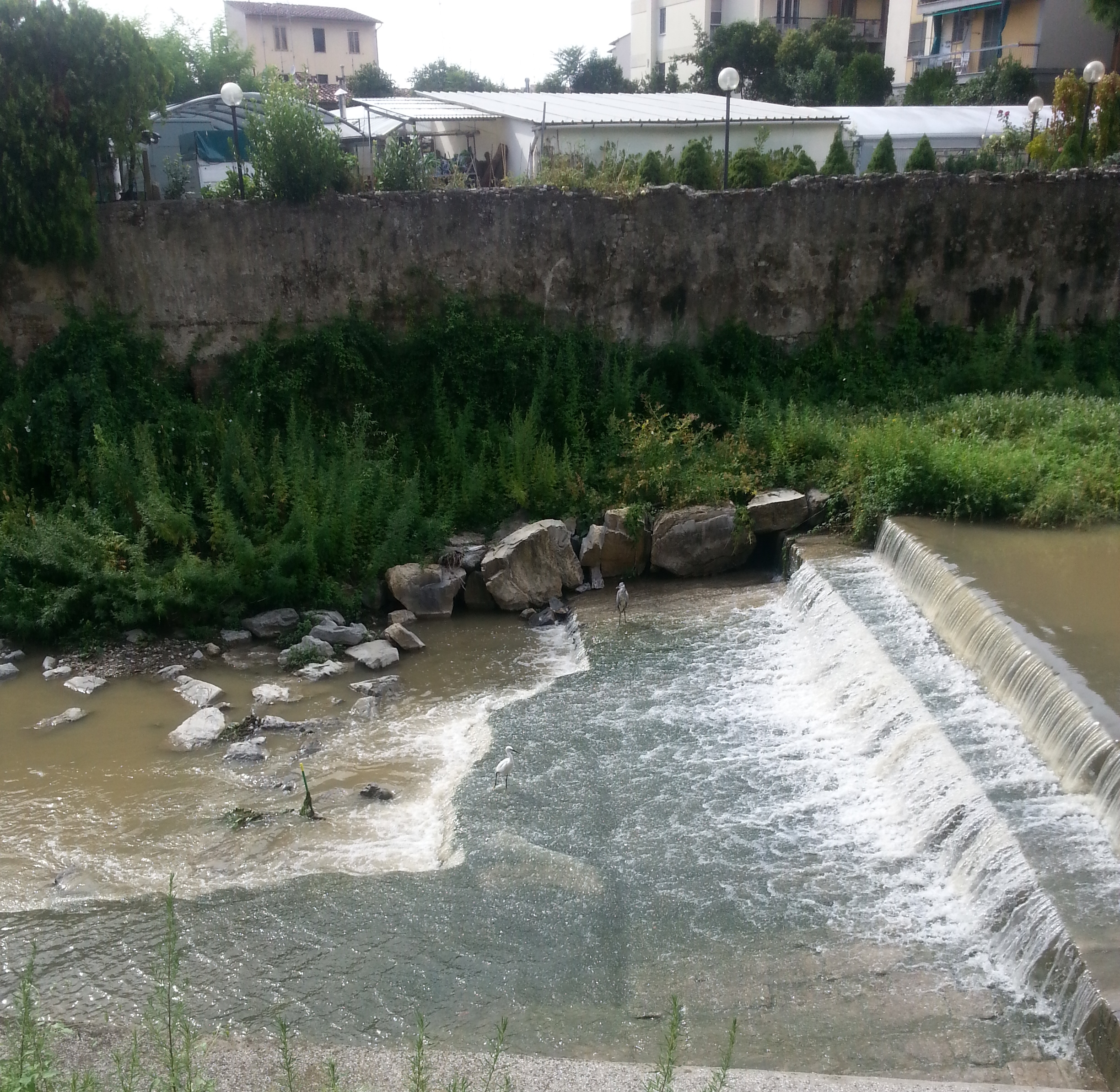
Terzolle stream

== The protected area ==
Adjacent to the site of community interest of Monte Morello, the protected natural area of local interest (ANPIL) of Terzolle was proposed in 2004, on an area of 1,927 hectares in the municipalities of Florence, Vaglia and Sesto Fiorentino, on the east side of Monte Morello at about 500 m a.s.l. The area preserves wooded areas of the Mediterranean type and rural environments in which buildings and valuable crops alternate; this landscape is marked by cypresses and olive trees.

== Other projects ==
- Wikimedia Commons contains images or other files about Terzolle
