= Vincent Lawrence Mpwaji =

Tanzanian Catholic prelate (born 1978)

The Most Reverend Vincent Lawrence Mpwaji
- Auxiliary Bishop of Dar es Salaam, Tanzania
- Church: Catholic Church
- Archdiocese: Roman Catholic Archdiocese of Dar es Salaam
- See: Dar es Salaam
- Appointed: 11 July 2026
- Other post: Titular Bishop of Tacarata (since 11 July 2026)

Orders
- Ordination: 7 July 2008
- Consecration: 5 September 2026 by Jude Thaddaeus Ruwa'ichi
- Rank: Bishop

Personal details
- Born: Vincent Lawrence Mpwaji; 5 June 1978 (age 48) Morogoro, Diocese of Morogoro, Morogoro Region, Tanzania

Styles of Vincent Lawrence Mpwaji
- Reference style: Your Lordship; The Most Reverend
- Spoken style: His Lordship
- Religious style: Bishop

Vincent Lawrence Mpwaji (born 5 June 1978), is a Tanzanian Catholic prelate who was appointed Auxiliary Bishop of the Roman Catholic Archdiocese of Dar es Salaam, in Tanzania on 11 July 2026. Before that, from 7 July 2008 until 11 July 2026, he served as a priest of the same Catholic Archdiocese. Pope Leo XIV appointed him bishop. The Holy Father assigned him Titular Bishop of Tacarata. His episcopal consecration at Dar es Salaam, took place on 5 September 2026.

== Early life and education ==
Vincent Lawrence Mpwaji was born on 5 June 1978, in Morogoro, Diocese of Morogoro, Morogoro Region, Tanzania. He attended the Saint Anthony of Padua Seminary in Bukoba, Tanzania, where he studied philosophy. He then studied theology at the Saint Charles Lwanga Seminary in Dar-es-Salaam. Later, he graduated with a Doctorate degree in Dogmatic Theology from the Pontifical Gregorian University in Rome, Italy.

== Priest ==
He was ordained a priest on 7 July 2008, in Dar es Salaam and was incardinated in that Metropolitan Ecclesiastical Province. He served as a priest until 11 July 2026. While a priest, he served in various roles and locations including:

- Diocesan Secretary, Secretary for Education, and Notary of the Archdiocesan Tribunal from 2008 until 2011.
- Studies at the Pontifical Gregorian University in Rome leading to the award of a Doctorate in Dogmatic Theology in from 2011 until 2021.
- Member of the Archdiocesan Projects Committee 2021 until 2026.
- Chancellor of the Archdiocese of Dar es Salaam from 2021 until 2026.
- Deputy Parish Priest of Saint Joseph Cathedral in Dar es Salaam from 2021 until 2026.

== Bishop ==
On 11 July 2026, Pope Leo XIV appointed Reverend Father Vincent Lawrence Mpwaji, previously a member of the clergy of the same archdiocese and Diocesan Chancellor, as Auxiliary Bishop of the Archdiocese of Dar-es-Salaam. The Holy Father concurrently assigned him Titular Bishop of Tacarata. He received his episcopal consecration as a bishop on 5 September 2026 by the hands of Jude Thaddaeus Ruwa'ichi, Archbishop of Dar-es-Salaam, who was assisted by Beatus Kinyaiya, Archbishop of Dodoma and Henry Mchamungu, Titular Bishop of Tanaramusa.

== See also ==
- Catholic Church in Tanzania

== Succession table ==
Catholic Church titles
Preceded by	Auxiliary Bishop of Dar es Salaam (since 11 July 2026)	Succeeded by
