= Martin Marahrens =

German Roman Catholic bishop (born 1977)

The Most Reverend Martin Marahrens
- Church: Catholic Church
- Diocese: Hildesheim
- Appointed: 28 November 2025
- Other post: Titular Bishop of Cercina (since 2025)

Orders
- Ordination: 10 October 2004 by Joachim Wanke
- Consecration: 28 February 2026 by Heiner Wilmer

Personal details
- Born: 24 May 1977 (age 49) Gehrden, Lower Saxony, West Germany
- Education: Sankt Georgen Graduate School of Philosophy and Theology; Pontifical Gregorian University
- Motto: Tu es Christus
- Coat of arms

Martin Marahrens (born 24 May 1977) is a German Roman Catholic prelate who has served as an auxiliary bishop of the Diocese of Hildesheim since 2026. He was appointed titular bishop of Cercina and auxiliary bishop of Hildesheim by Pope Leo XIV on 28 November 2025. He was consecrated a bishop in Hildesheim Cathedral on 28 February 2026 by Heiner Wilmer, Bishop of Hildesheim.

== Early life and education ==
Marahrens was born on 24 May 1977 in Gehrden, in the Diocese of Hildesheim in Lower Saxony. He grew up in Seelze. He studied philosophy and theology at the Sankt Georgen Graduate School of Philosophy and Theology in Frankfurt and at the Pontifical Gregorian University in Rome, where he was a member of the Pontifical Collegium Germanicum et Hungaricum. He received a doctorate in theology from the Gregorian University in 2008.

== Priesthood ==
Marahrens was ordained a priest for the Diocese of Hildesheim on 10 October 2004 in Rome by Joachim Wanke, then Bishop of Erfurt.

After his ordination, Marahrens served as a parochial vicar in Burgdorf from 2008 and was responsible for the Emmaus youth ministry in Duderstadt from 2008 to 2014. From 2014 he served as rector (Regens) of the Hildesheim diocesan seminary. He also served in pastoral ministry in the Hildesheim deanery from 2014 to 2023 and as a cathedral vicar (Domvikar) at Hildesheim Cathedral from 2015 to 2023. From 2023 he was a priest personnel officer in the diocesan curia.

In December 2023, Bishop Heiner Wilmer appointed Marahrens a canon of Hildesheim Cathedral, effective 1 January 2024. He thus became a member of the Hildesheim cathedral chapter.

== Episcopate ==
On 28 November 2025, Pope Leo XIV appointed Marahrens auxiliary bishop of Hildesheim and titular bishop of Cercina. At the time of his appointment he was rector of the diocesan seminary and a canon of Hildesheim Cathedral.

Marahrens was consecrated bishop on 28 February 2026 in Hildesheim Cathedral, with Heiner Wilmer as principal consecrator. He thereby became an auxiliary bishop of Hildesheim.

His episcopal motto is Tu es Christus ("You are the Christ"), taken from Mark 8:29. The motto was also his first-mass motto at his priestly ordination. Marahrens said that the phrase reflected his view that Christ, rather than individuals who seek to place themselves at the centre, should remain the focus of Christian life and ministry.

== Diocesan administrator ==
Following the transfer of Heiner Wilmer to the Diocese of Münster in 2026, the see of Hildesheim became vacant. The Hildesheim cathedral chapter subsequently elected Marahrens diocesan administrator, and he assumed responsibility for governing the diocese until a new diocesan bishop takes office.
