= Cristino Ramos González =

Paraguyan Roman Catholic prelate (born 1975)

The Reverend Cristino Ramos González
- Bishop of Concepción en Paraguay
- Church: Catholic Church
- Diocese: Concepción en Paraguay
- Appointed: 8 May 2026
- Predecessor: Miguel Ángel Cabello

Orders
- Ordination: 7 September 2002

Personal details
- Born: 16 November 1975 (age 50) Arroyos y Esteros, Cordillera Department, Paraguay
- Education: Pontifical Catholic University of Argentina; Universidad Católica Nuestra Señora de la Asunción; Bolivian Catholic University San Pablo; University of Tübingen; Pontifical Gregorian University
- Coat of arms

Msgr. Cristino Ramos González (born 16 November 1975) is a Paraguayan bishop of the Roman Catholic Diocese of Concepción en Paraguay. He was elevated to the position of bishop by Pope Leo XIV on 8 May 2026, after serving as parish priest of the San José Obrero parish in Choré District, in the San Pedro diocese.

== Early life and education ==
Cristino Ramos González was born on 16 November 1975, to his father Cristino Ramos González and his mother Delia Catalina González in Arroyo y Esteros in the Cordillera Department of Paraguay. He has four siblings: three older brothers Eulogio, Miguel, and Ramón, who are farmers with his mother, and a younger sister Sonia, who is a teacher. His mother recalled that during his time as a seminarian, Fr. Cristino would return to the farm during summer vacations to help with the agricultural work and sell beans. She also recounted that he has wanted to be a priest from a young age, since the third grade, and was able to enter seminary with much effort and family support.

Following his appointment as bishop in 2026, his family gathered at his mother Delia's home in Santa Rosa del Aguaray to celebrate. His father had died in 2020.

He was awarded a bachelor's degree in theology from the Pontifical Catholic University of Argentina in Buenos Aires, and a licentiate in pastoral sciences from the Higher Institute of the Catholic University of Nuestra Señora de la Asunción.

== Priesthood ==
He was ordained a priest on 7 September 2002 into the diocese of San Pedro. After ordination, he first held the roles of representative of the rural area of the parish of San Pedro Apóstol up until 2008, the diocesan assessor for youth pastoral ministry until 2009, and the chancellor of the diocese until 2011. He also as a member of the Presbyteral council in San Pedro from 2003 to 2011 and again from 2020 to 2026, and member of the College of Consultors from 2005 to 2007. In his work with the youth pastoral ministry, he served as the national assessor from 2006 to 2008, and the assessor of the Southern Cone region from 2007 to 2010. Fr. Ramos González was appointed as the parish priest of San José Obrero in the diocese of San Pedro from 2016 to 2019.

During his time as a priest, Fr. Ramos González studied biblical theology at the Bolivian Catholic University San Pablo in Bolivia, the Eberhard Karl University of Tübingen in Germany, and the Pontifical Gregorian University in Italy from 2016 to 2019.

After finishing his education, he has served as the parish priest of San José Obrero parish and the spiritual assessor since 2020, and as the pastoral vicar of the diocese of San Pedro since 2022.

== Episcopal career ==
On 8 May 2026, Fr. Ramos González was appointed to succeed Miguel Ángel Cabello as the sixth bishop of the Diocese of Concepción en Paraguay by Pope Leo XIV. The Holy See has not yet released when he is scheduled to receive his episcopal consecration.

== See also ==
- Catholic Church hierarchy
- Catholic Church in Paraguay
- List of episcopal appointments by Pope Leo XIV
