= Franciscus Kopong Kung =

21st-century Indonesian Catholic bishop

Fransiskus Kopong Kung
- Bishop emeritus of the Larantuka
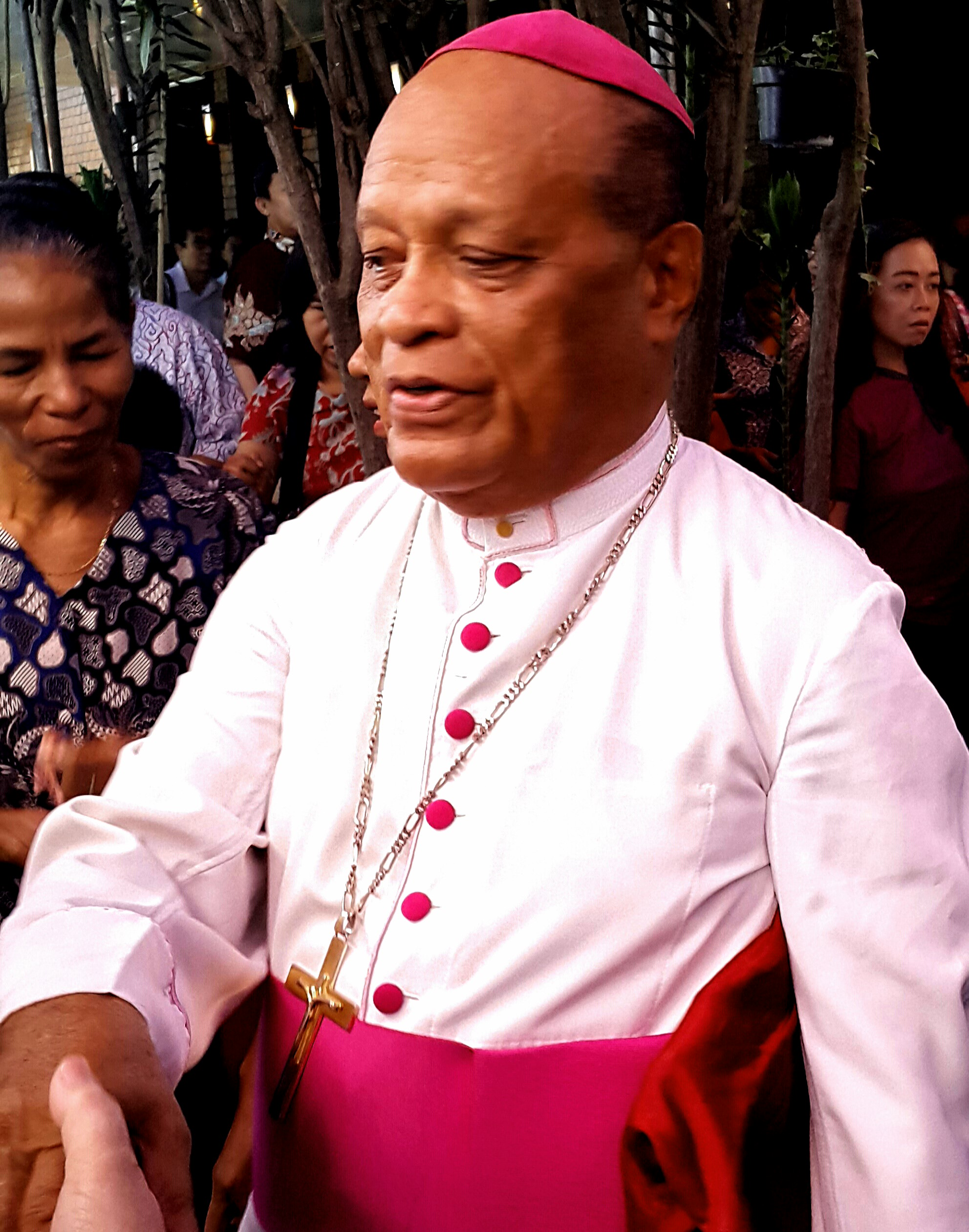
- Kopong Kung in 2017
- Church: Roman Catholic Church
- Archdiocese: Larantuka
- In office: 2001 – 2004 (as coadjutor bishop of Larantuka); 2004 – 2025 (as bishop of Larantuka)
- Predecessor: Darius Nggawa S.V.D.
- Successor: Mons. Dr. Johannes Chrysostomos Berchmans Hanssen Monteiro, Ph.D., Th.D.
- Previous post: Coadjutor Bishop of Larantuka

Orders
- Ordination: 29 June 1982
- Consecration: 10 January 2002 by Darius Nggawa S.V.D.
- Rank: bishop

Personal details
- Born: 3 August 1950 (age 76) Lamika, Demon Pagong, East Flores, East Nusa Tenggara, Indonesia

Franciscus Kopong Kung (born 3 August 1950) is an Indonesian Roman Catholic bishop.

== Biography ==
Born in East Flores Regency, Kopong Kung was ordained a priest in the Archdiocese of Ende on 29 June 1982.

On 2 October 2001 Kopong Kung was named coadjutor bishop of the diocese of Larantuka, due to the poor health of then bishop Darius Nggawa. On 10 January 2002 Kopong Kung was ordained as bishop, with Nggawa being the principle consecrator, and Longinus Da Cunha, then archbishop of Ende, and Leo Laba Ladjar O.F.M. being the two co-consecrators. After Nggawa's official retirement after he turned 75, Kopong Kung was installed as permanent bishop of Larantuka on 16 June 2004.

Kopong Kung has been the chair of the Indonesian Bishops' Conference of the Family Commission for two terms starting in 2012.

After priest and monks in his diocese held demonstrations over the killing of a man by police in March 2014, Kopong Kung refused to denounce the clergy who protested but warned them to not drag the Catholic church in Indonesia into politics.

Kopong Kung was one of the co-consecrators of Ewaldus Martinus Sedu, who was ordained bishop of Roman Catholic Diocese of Maumere on 26 September 2018. Gerulfus Kherubim Pareira S.V.D and Vincentius Sensi Potokota were the other two consectators. More than 20,000 people reportedly attended the event.
