= Joseph Samedi =

Central African Catholic prelate (born 1971)

The Most Reverend Joseph Samedi
- Coadjutor Archbishop-Elect of Bangui; Central African Republic
- Church: Catholic Church
- Archdiocese: Roman Catholic Archdiocese of Bangui
- See: Bangui
- Appointed: 25 April 2026
- Installed: 14 June 2026

Orders
- Ordination: 6 August 2006
- Consecration: 14 June 2026 by Fortunatus Nwachukwu

Personal details
- Born: Joseph Samedi; 20 December 1971 (age 54) Mongoumba, Lobaye Prefecture, Central African Republic
- Motto: "In omnibus amare et servire" (In everything, love and serve)

Styles of Joseph Samedi
- Reference style: His Grace; The Most Reverend
- Spoken style: Your Grace
- Religious style: Bishop

Joseph Samedi S.J. (born 20 December 1971) is a Central African Catholic prelate who was appointed Coadjutor Archbishop of the Roman Catholic Archdiocese of Bangui, Central African Republic on 25 April 2026. Before that, from 6 August 2006 until 25 April 2026, he served as a priest of Jesuits Catholic Order. He was appointed bishop by Pope Leo XIV. His episcopal consecration took place at Bangui on 14 June 2026. He is a professed member of the Society of Jesus (S.J.), a Catholic Religious Order.

== Background and education ==
He was born on 20 December 1971 in Mongoumba, in the Diocese of Mbaïki, Lobaye Prefecture, Central African Republic. He studied for his novitiate in Bafoussam, Cameroon. He studied philosophy in the Saint-Pierre Canisius Faculty of Philosophy in Kinshasa, Democratic Republic of the Congo. He studied in Chad, as part of his "Jesuit formation". He studied theology in Brussels, Belgium. He graduated with a licentiate in Church History from the Pontifical Gregorian University in Rome, Italy.

== Priest ==
He was ordained a priest for the Jesuits on 6 August 2006. He served as a priest until 25 April 2026. While a priest he served in various roles and locations, including:

- Head of the Library and vicar of the French-speaking parish of Bangui from 2008 until 2009.
- Formator at the Saint-Marc National Major Seminary of Bangui from 2009 until 2018.
- "Superior ad tempus" (Temporary superior) of the Society of Jesus in Bangui from 2011 until 2018.
- Head of ongoing formation of the clergy of the Archdiocese of Bangui from 2011 until 2018.
- Director of the Saint-Charles Lwanga College in Sarh, Chad from 2018 until 2024.
- Director of the Pope Francis School Complex from 2024 until 2026.
- Superior of the Society of Jesus in Bangui from 2024 until 2026.

== Bishop ==
On 25 April 2026, Pope Leo XIV appointed Reverend Father Monsignor Joseph Samedi, S.J., previously director of the Pope Francis School Complex and Superior of the Society of Jesus in Bangui, as Coadjutor Bishop of the Metropolitan Province of Bangui, Central African Republic. He was consecrated bishop on 14 June 2026. The Principal Consecrator was Fortunatus Nwachukwu, Titular Archbishop of Aquaviva.

== See also ==
- Roman Catholicism in the Central African Republic

== Succession table ==
Catholic Church titles
| Preceded by | Coadjutor Bishop of Bangui (since 25 April 2026) | Succeeded by |
