= Johannes Chrysostomos Berchmans Hanssen Monteiro =

Indonesian Catholic bishop (born 1971)

His Excellency, The Most Reverend Monsignor Johannes Chrysostomos Berchmans Hanssen Monteiro DD, PhD, ThD
- Bishop of Larantuka
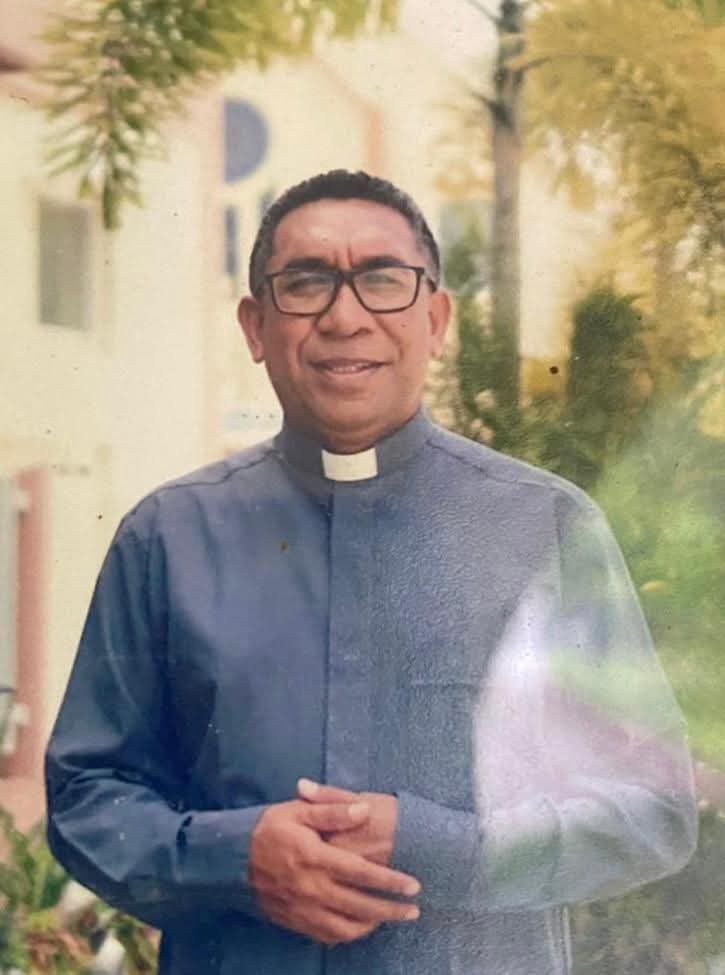
- Monteiro in 2025
- Church: Catholic Church
- Diocese: Larantuka
- Appointed: 22 November 2025
- Installed: 11 February 2026
- Predecessor: Franciscus Kopong Kung

Orders
- Ordination: 14 July 1999 by Darius Nggawa
- Consecration: 11 February 2026 by Franciscus Kopong Kung

Personal details
- Born: 14 April 1971 (age 55) Larantuka, Indonesia
- Denomination: Catholic
- Occupation: Bishop, clergyman, prelate
- Education: University of Vienna
- Motto: Unum Corpus, Unus Spiritus, et Una Spes

Styles of Johannes Chrysostomos Berchmans Hanssen Monteiro
- Reference style: His Excellency; The Most Reverend
- Spoken style: Monsignor
- Religious style: Bishop

Johannes Chrysostomos Berchmans Hanssen Monteiro (born 14 April 1971), often referred to as Father Hans or Monsignor Hans, is an Indonesian Catholic prelate, academic, theologian, and philosopher. He has been serving as the 4th Bishop of Diocese of Larantuka in East Flores, East Nusa Tenggara, Indonesia since November 2025. He previously had become lecturer staff in liturgy at the Ledalero Institute of Philosophy and Creative Technology and formator at the Saint Petrus Interdiocesan Major Seminary School in Ritapiret, Indonesia.

== Biography ==
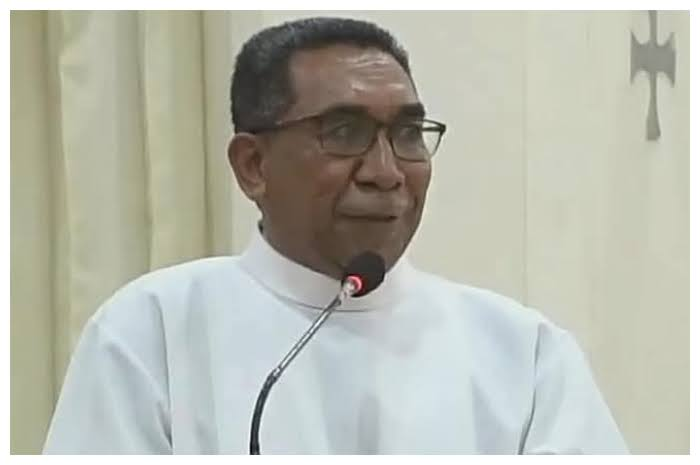
Monteiro in 2025

Hanssen Monteiro was born on 14 April 1971 in Larantuka, East Nusa Tenggara, Indonesia, where he was raised and received his early education. He attended the minor seminary school of Santo Domingo in Hokeng and studied there. He then studied at the Catholic Philosophical and Theological Institute of Ledalero, Indonesia, subsequently carrying out a pastoral apprenticeship in the St. Joseph parish church in Lewotobi. He was ordained a priest for the Diocese of Larantuka on 14 July 1999 by Bishop Darius Nggawa. After ordination, he taught in his first alma mater, the minor seminary school of Santo Domingo in Hokeng from 1999 to 2004. From 2004 to 2018 he was parish vicar at Franz-von-Assisi-Kirche, Mexikoplatz, and Maria Himmelfahrt in Bad Deutsch-Altenburg, Vienna, Austria.

Beginning in 2004, he studied at the University of Vienna in Vienna, Austria. He earned a licentiate and doctorate degree in subjects of liturgy and philosophy at the Faculty of Catholic Philosophy and Theology of the University of Vienna, Austria. He then returned to Indonesia, where he taught liturgy, philosophy, and theology at the Ledalero Institute of Philosophy and Creative Technology and became formator at the Saint Petrus Interdiocesan Major Seminary in Ritapiret, Diocese of Maumere (since 2018), and member of the Commission for the Liturgy of the Indonesian Episcopal Conference (since 2022).

On 22 November 2025, Pope Leo XIV appointed him as the Bishop of Diocese of Larantuka, after the resignation of his predecessor, Mons. Franciscus Kopong Kung. His solemn episcopal consecration and installation as bishop will scheduled on 11 February 2026.
