= Miro Relota =

Bosnian Roman Catholic prelate

The Most Reverend Miro Relota
- Military Ordinary of Bosnia and Herzegovina
- Appointed: 21 November 2025
- Installed: 14 February 2026

Personal details
- Born: July 1, 1965 (age 60) Gusti Grab, Busovača, SR Bosnia and Herzegovina, Yugoslavia
- Denomination: Roman Catholic
- Motto: Sluga božjeg mira
- Coat of arms

Miro Relota O.F.M. (born 1 July 1965) is a Bosnian and Herzegovinian bishop-elect. He was born in Gusti Grab, Busovača. He was appointed the Military Ordinary of the Bosnia and Herzegovina, by Pope Leo XIV on 25 November 2025. He was ordained a bishop on 14 February 2026.

Styles of Miro Relota
- Reference style: Most Reverend
- Spoken style: Your Excellency
- Religious style: Bishop
