= Darius Nggawa =

Indonesian Roman Catholic bishop (1929–2008)

Darius Nggawa SVD
- Bishop of Larantuka
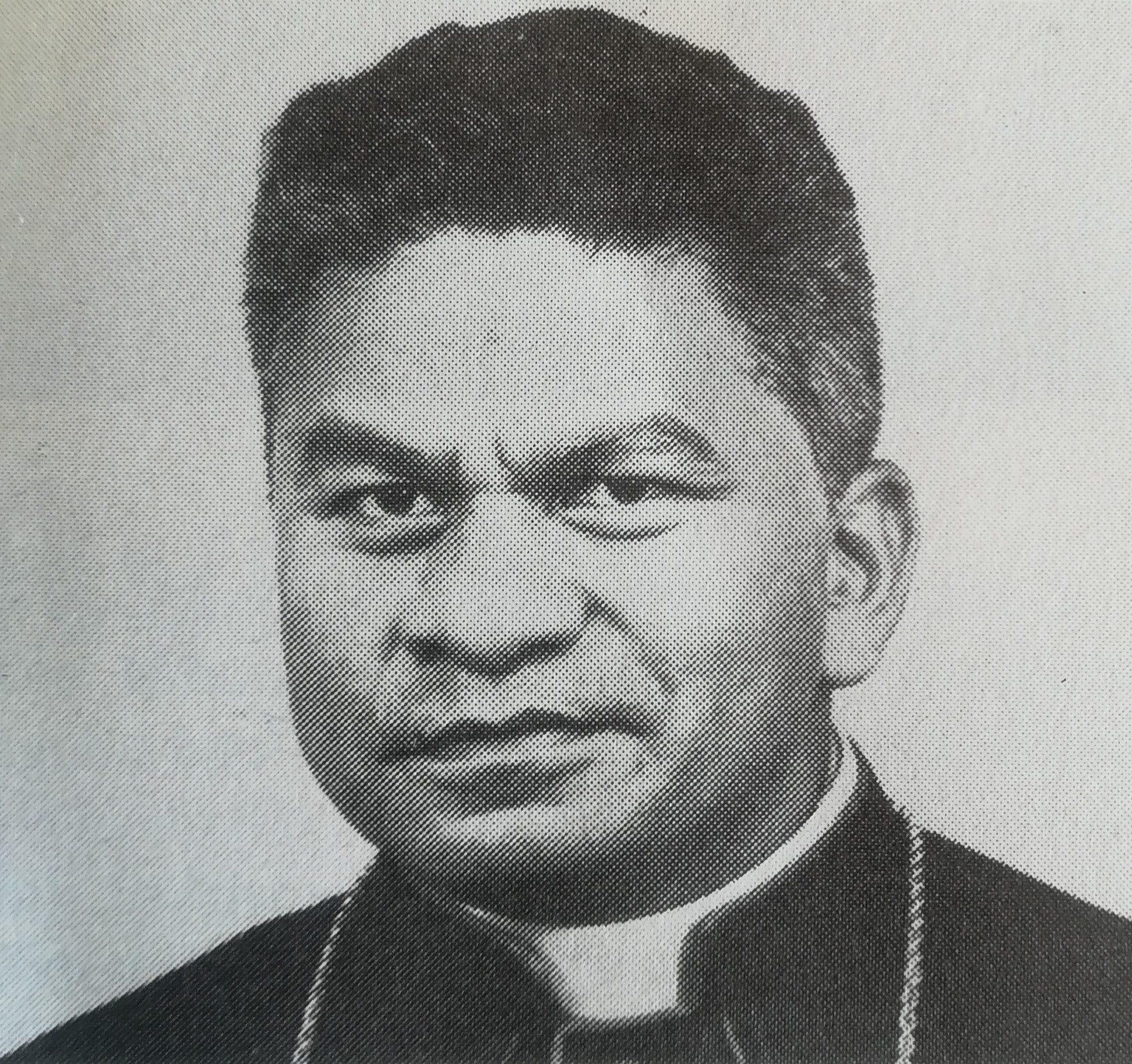
- Church: Catholic Church
- Diocese: Diocese of Larantuka
- In office: 28 February 1974 – 16 June 2004
- Predecessor: Antonius Hubertus Thijssen
- Successor: Franciscus Kopong Kung

Orders
- Ordination: 12 October 1955
- Consecration: 16 June 1974 by Antonius Hubertus Thijssen

Personal details
- Born: 1 May 1929 Nggela (in present-day Ende Regency), Timor and Dependencies Residency, Dutch East Indies, Dutch Empire
- Died: 9 January 2008 (aged 78)

Darius Nggawa (1 May 1929 – 9 January 2008) was an Indonesian Roman Catholic bishop.

Ordained to the priesthood on 12 October 1955, Nggawa was named bishop of Roman Catholic Diocese of Larantuka, Indonesia on 28 February 1974 and retired on 19 June 2004.
