= Pollos =

Coordinates: 41°27′N 5°07′W

Pollos, Spain
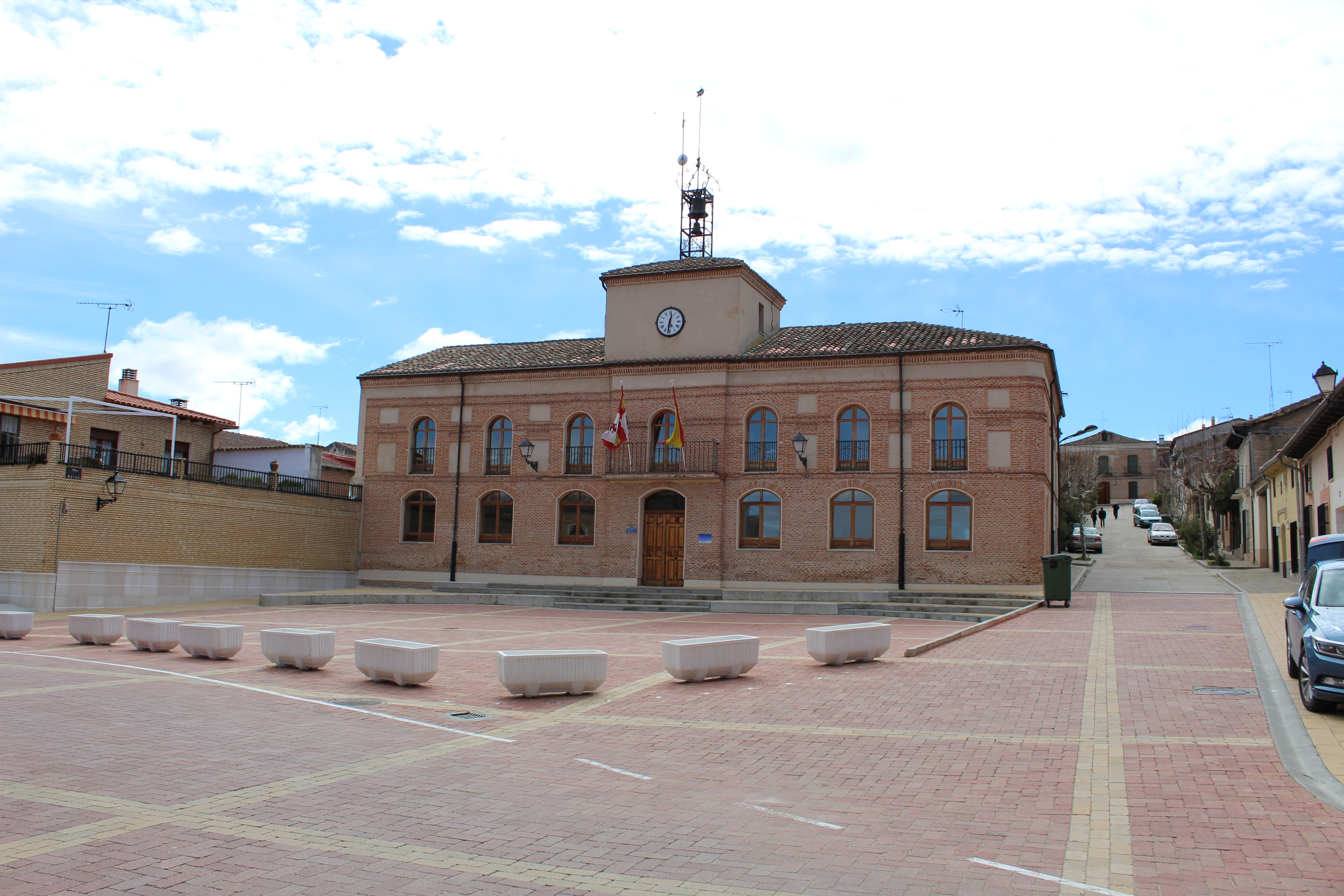
- City Hall and Main Square of Pollos

- Coat of arms
- Interactive map of Pollos, Spain
- Country: Spain
- Autonomous community: Castile and León
- Province: Valladolid
- Municipality: En forma

Area
  - Total: 50 km^{2} (19 sq mi)

Population (2025-01-01)
  - Total: 565
  - Density: 11/km^{2} (29/sq mi)
- Time zone: UTC+1 (CET)
  - Summer (DST): UTC+2 (CEST)

Pollos is a municipality located in the province of Valladolid, Castile and León, Spain. According to the 2004 census (INE), the municipality has a population of 780 inhabitants.

Pollo is also the Spanish word for chicken.

== See also ==
- Cuisine of the province of Valladolid
