= Mugnone =

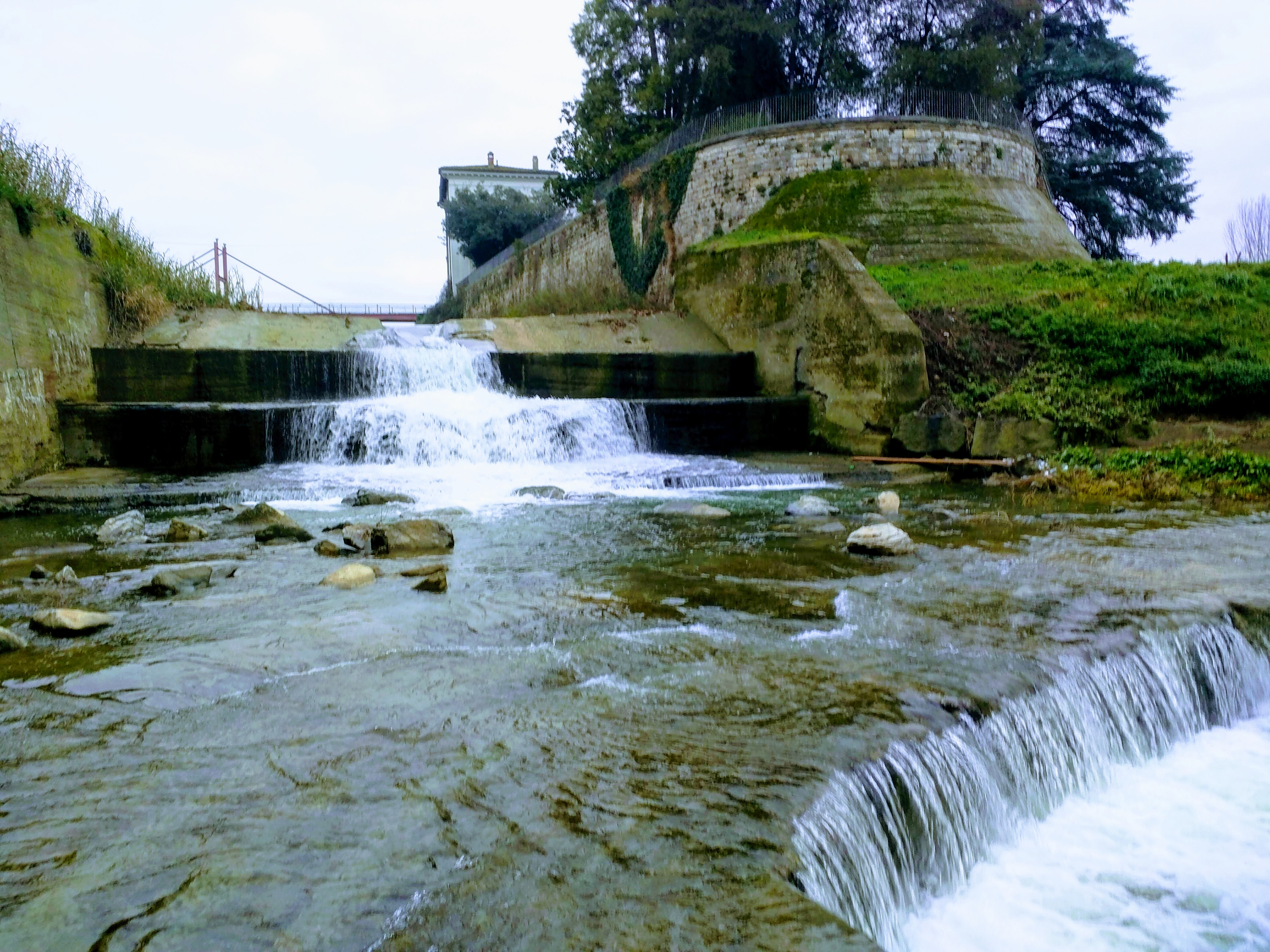
- The Mugnone entering the Arno river

Location
- Country: Italy
- Region: Tuscany

Physical characteristics
- Source
  - coordinates: 43.795062°N 11.274995°E
- Mouth
  - coordinates: 43.790200°N 11.196557°E
- Length: 7.2 km (4.5 mi)

Basin features
- Progression: Mugnone→ Arno→ Tyrrhenian Sea

The Mugnone is a river in Italy that runs through Florence and is a tributary of the Arno. The river has been known since Roman times. The river historically flowed into the Arno near the Ponte Vecchio, which is why the city was founded there (at the historic confluence of the Mugnone and the Arno). The river was diverted in the 1280s during construction of the new city walls.
