= Diocese of Morogoro =

The Diocese of Morogoro may refer to:

- Anglican Diocese of Morogoro, in Tanzania
- Roman Catholic Diocese of Morogoro, in Tanzania
- Lutheran Diocese of Morogoro, in Tanzania
