= Manugonda =

Village in Telangana, India

Manugonda is a village in Geesugonda mandal in Warangal district of Telangana State, India. As part Telangana Districts re-organisation, Manugonda Village Geesugonda Mandal re organised from Warangal District to Warangal Rural district. It is located 16 km towards East from District headquarters Warangal. 3 km from Geesgonda.

Manugonda Pin code is 506330 and postal head office is Dharmaram (Warangal).

Geesgonda ( 3 km ), Gangadevarapalle ( 3 km ), Akkampet ( 4 km ), Elkurthy ( 4 km ), Bodduchintalpalle ( 5 km ) are the nearby Villages to Manugonda. Manugonda is surrounded by Duggondi Mandal towards East, Atmakur Mandal towards North, Sangam Mandal towards South, Warangal Mandal towards west .

Warangal, Jangaon, Yellandu, and Karimnagar are all towns close to Manugonda.

Telugu is the Local Language here. The total population of Manugonda is 2942. Males are 1515 and Females are 1,427 living in 688 Houses. Total area of Manugonda is 919 hectares.
