= Miguel Ángel Contreras Llajaruna =

Catholic prelate

Miguel Ángel Contreras Llajaruna SM
- Auxiliary Bishop of Callao
- Church: Catholic Church
- Diocese: Callao
- Appointed: 15 May 2025
- Other post: Titular Bishop of Babar (since 2025)

Orders
- Ordination: 25 April 2008
- Consecration: 12 July 2025 by Luis Alberto Barrera Pacheco

Personal details
- Born: 5 July 1979 (age 47) Cajabamba, Peru

Miguel Ángel Contreras Llajaruna (born 5 July 1979) is a Peruvian Roman Catholic prelate who is an Auxiliary Bishop in the Roman Catholic Diocese of Callao. He was the first bishop to be appointed by Pope Leo XIV. Prior to this, he was the episcopal vicar for Consecrated Life in the same diocese and superior of the América del Sur district of the Marist Fathers.

His episcopal ordination took place on 12 July 2015.
