= Załuski-Lipniewo =

- Village
- Location within Poland
- Coordinates: 52°50′1″N 22°13′25″E
- Country: Poland
- Voivodeship: Masovian
- County: Ostrów
- Gmina: Andrzejewo
- Population: 90

Załuski-Lipniewo [zaˈwuski lipˈɲɛvɔ] is a village in the administrative district of Gmina Andrzejewo, within Ostrów County, Masovian Voivodeship, in east-central Poland.
