= Military Ordinariate of Bosnia and Herzegovina =

Catholic ecclesiastical jurisdiction in Bosnia and Herzegovina

Bishop of Military Ordinariate of Bosnia and Herzegovina
- Bishopric

catholic
- Incumbent: Miro Relota O.F.M.

Location
- Country: Bosnia and Herzegovina
- Coordinates: 43°52′N 18°25′E

Information
- First holder: Tomo Vukšić
- Denomination: Catholic Church
- Sui iuris church: Latin Church
- Established: Military ordinariate in 2011

The Military Ordinariate of Bosnia and Herzegovina (Croatian: Vojni ordinarijat u Bosni i Hercegovini) is a Latin Church military ordinariate of the Catholic Church. Immediately exempt to the Holy See, it provides pastoral care to Catholics serving in Armed Forces of Bosnia and Herzegovina and their families.

== History ==
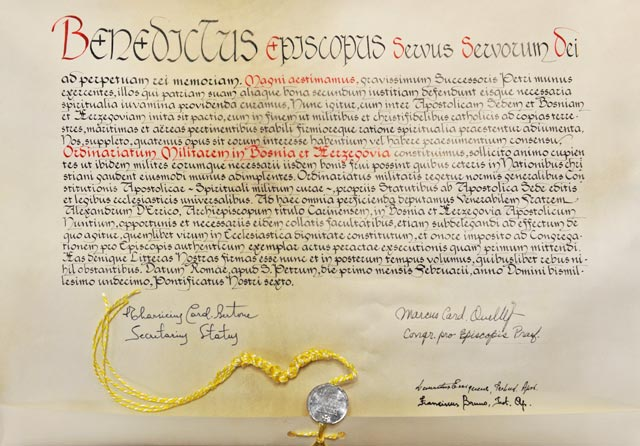
Magni aestimamus

It was created as a military ordinariate by pope Benedict XVI on 1 February 2011 by apostolic bull Magni aestimamus.

== Ordinaries ==
Military bishops of Bosnia and Herzegovina
From	Until	Incumbent	Notes
2011	2020	Tomo Vukšić	Appointed the Military Ordinary of the Bosnia and Herzegovina by Pope Benedict XVI on 1 February 2011. Appointed Coadjutor Archbishop of Vrhbosna on 22 January 2020.
2020	2025	Sede vacante	
2025	present	Miro Relota O.F.M.	Appointed the Military Ordinary of the Bosnia and Herzegovina by Pope Leo XIV on 21 November 2025.
