= Diocese of Larantuka =

Roman Catholic diocese in Indonesia

Coordinates: 8.8500°S 121.3000°E

Diocese of Larantuka Dioecesis Larantukana Keuskupan Larantuka
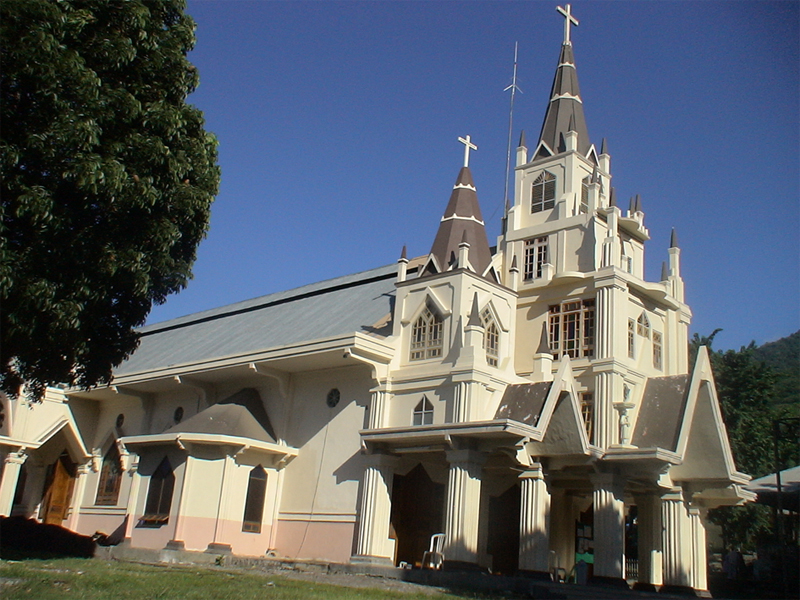
- Cathedral of the Queen of the Rosary

Location
- Country: Indonesia
- Ecclesiastical province: Ende
- Metropolitan: Ende

Statistics
- Area: 4,024 km^{2} (1,554 sq mi)
- Population: Total; Catholics: (as of 2004); 274,373; 256,280 (93.4%)

Information
- Rite: Latin Rite
- Cathedral: Cathedral of the Queen of the Rosary in Larantuka

Current leadership
- Pope: Leo XIV
- Bishop: Mons. Dr. Johannes Chrysostomos Berchmans Hanssen Monteiro, D.D., Ph.D., Th.D.
- Metropolitan Archbishop: Paul Boedhie Kleden, SVD

The Roman Catholic Diocese of Larantuka (Latin: Dioecesis Larantukana) is a suffragan Latin diocese in the ecclesiastical province of the Metropolitan of Ende in Indonesia's Lesser Sunda Islands.

Its cathedral episcopal see is Katedral Reinha Rosari (dedicated to Mary as Queen of the Rosary) in the city of Larantuka, in Nusa Tenggara Timur.

== History ==
- Established on March 8, 1951 as Apostolic Vicariate of Larantuka, on territory split off from the Apostolic Vicariate of Isole della Piccola Sonda (Lesser Sunda).
- Promoted on January 3, 1961 as Diocese of Larantuka

== Episcopal ordinaries ==
(all Roman Rite)

Apostolic Vicar of Larantuka

- Mons. Gabriel Manek, Divine Word Missionaries (S.V.D.) (March 8, 1951 – January 3, 1961), Titular Bishop of Alinda (1951.03.08 – 1961.01.03), later Metropolitan Archbishop of Ende (Indonesia) (1961.01.03 – 1968.12.19), retired as Titular Archbishop of Bavagaliana (1968.12.19 – 1976.05.15)

Suffragan Bishops of Larantuka

- Mons. Antoine Hubert Thijssen, S.V.D. (January 3, 1961 – February 23, 1973), previously Titular Bishop of Nilopolis (1951.03.08 – 1961.01.03) & Apostolic Vicar of Endeh (Indonesia) (1951.03.08 – 1961.01.03), later Apostolic Administrator of Denpasar (Indonesia) (1973 – 1980.09.04) and Titular Bishop of Eguga (1973.02.23 – 1982.06.07)
- Mons. Darius Nggawa, S.V.D. (February 28, 1974 – June 16, 2004)
- Mons. Franciscus Kopong Kung (June 16, 2004 – 22 November 2025), succeeding as former Coadjutor Bishop of Larantuka (Indonesia) (2001.10.02 – 2004.06.16)
- Mons. Dr. Johannes Chrysostomos Berchmans Hanssen Monteiro, D.D., Ph.D., Th.D. (22 November 2025 - ...)

== Sources and external links ==
- GCatholic.org, with incumbent biography links
- Catholic Hierarchy
