= Tacarata =

Tacarata, was an ancient Roman era oppidum (town) in the Roman-Berber province of Numidia. It is identified with ruins in the territory of Mila or Annaba in modern Algeria.

Tacarata was also the seat of an ancient Catholic Church diocese of the Roman-Berber province of Numidia. There are three documented bishops of this diocese: Aspidio (Catholic bishop) attendee at the Council of Carthage (411), as did Verissimo his Donatist rival. Bishop Crescenzo attended the Council of Carthage (484) from the Vandal king Huneric, after which he was exiled. The bishopric ceased to function at the end of the 7th century with the Muslim conquest of the Maghreb. Today Tacarata survives as titular bishopric and now vacant.
