= Diocese of Concepción en Paraguay =

Roman Catholic diocese in Paraguay

Coordinates: 23.4092°S 57.4487°W

Diocese of Concepción en Paraguay Dioecesis Sanctissimae Conceptionis in Paraguay

Catholic

Location
- Country: Paraguay
- Metropolitan: Asunción

Statistics
- Area: 30,984 km^{2} (11,963 sq mi)
- Population: Total; Catholics: (as of 2006); 367,000; 362,000 (98.6%)

Information
- Rite: Latin Rite

Current leadership
- Pope: Leo XIV
- Bishop: Cristino Ramos González

Map

The Roman Catholic Diocese of Concepción en Paraguay (Latin: Dioecesis Sanctissimae Conceptionis in Paraguay) is a diocese located in the city of Concepción in the ecclesiastical province of Asunción in Paraguay.

== History ==
- On May 1, 1929, the Diocese of Concepción y Chaco was established from the Roman Catholic Diocese of Paraguay and Apostolic Prefecture of Pilcomayo.
- On July 7, 1949, the diocese was renamed as the Diocese of Concepción.

== Leadership ==
| No. | Name | Episcopacy |
|---|---|---|
| 1 | Emilio Sosa Gaona (Note: Alongside Auxiliary Bishop Julio Laschi from 1955 to 1965.) (1884–1970) | 30 April 1931 – 14 May 1963 |
| 2 | Aníbal Maricevich (1917–1996) | 4 December 1965 – 30 April 1993 |
| 3 | Juan Bautista Gavilán (b. 1951) | 5 March 1994 – 18 December 2001 |
| 4 | Zacarías Ortiz Rolón (1934–2020) | 12 July 2003 – 11 July 2013 |
| 5 | Miguel Ángel Cabello (b. 1965) | 11 July 2013 – 5 December 2024 |
| 6 | Cristino Ramos González (b. 1975 | 8 May 2026 – present |
