= Mongoumba =

- Location in Central African Republic
- Coordinates: 3°38′N 18°36′E
- Country: Central African Republic
- Prefecture: Lobaye
- Sub-prefecture: Mongoumba

Government
  - Sub-Prefect: Jean-Marie Mangao

Mongoumba is a town located in the Lobaye Prefecture, Central African Republic. From 1905–1933, Mongoumba was part of Moyen-Congo.

== History ==
=== Colonial Period ===
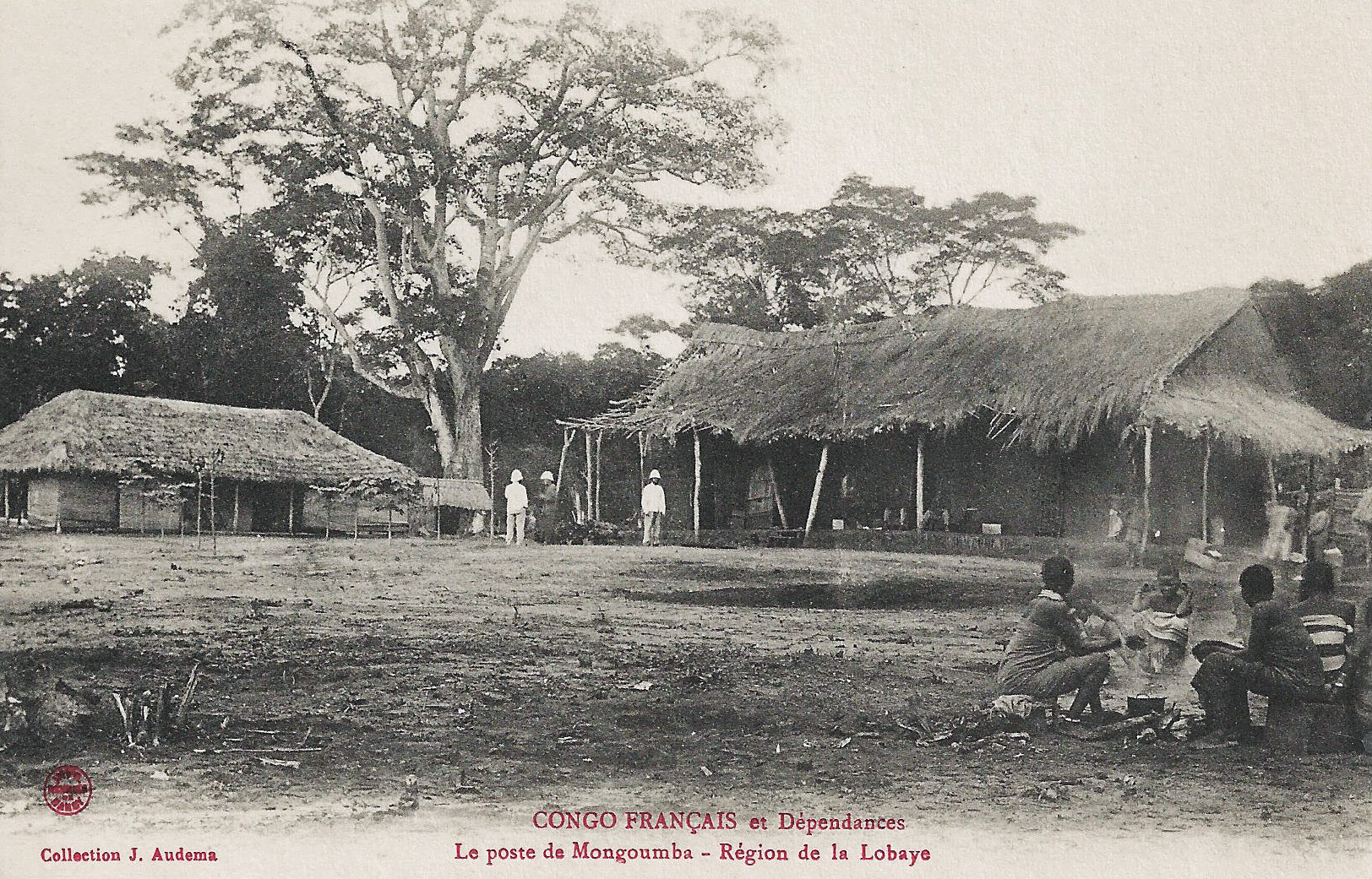
Mongoumba, 1900s

In 1905, Mongoumba became part of Moyen-Congo. Mongoumba was handed over to Germany in 1911. During World War I, French Army captured Mongoumba from Germany on 9 August 1914. French colonial government established a customs post in Mongoumba on 17 May 1923. On 1 January 1933, Mongoumba was ceded to Ubangi-Shari.

=== Central African Republic era (1960-present) ===
In 1976, Mongoumba received electricity.

On 5 March 2003, Movement for the Liberation of the Congo attacked Mongoumba to avenge FACA action who seized MLC logistics and detained its members. They freed their members and killed civilians. Moreover, MLC militias raped women and pillaged the hospital and houses.

== Healthcare ==
The town has one health center.
