= Cercina =

Coordinates: 43°50′41″N 11°15′44″E

- Frazione
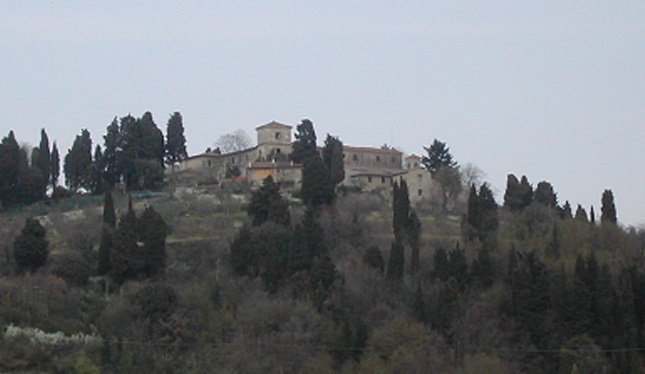
- Pieve di Sant'Andrea

- Location of Cercina in Italy
- Country: Italy
- Region: Tuscany
- Province: Florence
- Comune: Sesto Fiorentino
- Time zone: UTC+1 (CET)
  - Summer (DST): UTC+2 (CEST)
- Postal code: 50019

Cercina (Italian pronunciation: [tʃerˈtʃiːna]) is a frazione (rural borough) of the municipality of Sesto Fiorentino, in the Metropolitan City of Florence, central Italy, located on the slopes of Mount Morello.

Sights include the Pieve di Sant'Andrea, and the Castle of Castiglione, a former possession of the Catellini Castiglione family.
