= Darius Assandé Ekou =

Ivorian Catholic prelate (born 1968)

The Most Reverend Darius Assandé Ekou
- Bishop of Agboville, Ivory Coast
- Church: Catholic Church
- Archdiocese: Roman Catholic Archdiocese of Abidjan
- See: Diocese of Agboville
- Appointed: 27 February 2026
- Installed: 18 April 2026
- Predecessor: Alexis Youlo Touabli (14 October 2006 - 22 October 2025)
- Successor: Incumbent

Orders
- Ordination: 7 September 1996
- Consecration: 18 April 2026 by Mauricio Rueda Beltz
- Rank: Bishop

Personal details
- Born: Darius Assandé Ekou; 27 April 1968 (age 57) Bongouanou, Diocese of Abengourou, Ivory Coast

Styles of Darius Assandé Ekou
- Reference style: Your Lordship; The Most Reverend
- Spoken style: His Lordship
- Religious style: Bishop

Darius Assandé Ekou (born 27 April 1968) is an Ivorian Catholic prelate who was appointed bishop of the Roman Catholic Diocese of Agboville, in the Ecclesiastical Metropolitan Province of Abidjan in the Ivory Coast on 27 February 2026. Before that, from 7 September 1996 until 27 February 2026, he was a priest of the Diocese of Abengourou, in Ivory Coast. He was appointed bishop by Pope Leo XIV. He was consecrated and installed at Agboville on 18 April 2026.

== Background and education ==
Darius Assandé Ekou was born on 27 April 1968 at Bongouanou, Diocese of Abengourou, Ivory Coast. He studied philosophy and theology at the Saint-Coer-de-Marie Major Seminary in Anyama, in the archdiocese of Abidjan. From 2002 until 2009 he studied at the Pontifical Lateran University, in Rome, Italy where he graduated with a Doctorate in the social doctrine of the Church.

== Priest ==
He was ordained a priest for the Diocese of Abengourou, Ivory Coast on 7 September 1996. He served as a priest until 27 February 2026. While a priest, he served in various roles and locations, including:

- Vicar at the Cathedral of Sainte Thérèse de l'Enfant Jésus in Abengourou from 1996 until 1998.
- Head of the quasi-parish Saint Bernadette d'Ebilassokro from 1998 until 2001.
- Vicar of Sacré Coeur in Koun-Abronso from 2001 until 2001.
- Studies in Rome, Italy at the Pontifical Lateran University, leading to the award of a doctorate in the social doctrine of the Church, from 2002 until 2009.
- Provider of pastoral service at the parish of San Lorenzo Martire in Formello, Diocese of Civita Castellana from 2002 until 2009.
- Provider of pastoral services at the Abbey Sanctuary of Montevergine, Diocese of Avellino from 2002 until 2009.
- Secretary of the Curia of Abengourou from 2009 until 2010.
- Parish priest of Sacré Coeur in Arrah, Ivory Coast from 2010 until 2011.
- Parish priest of Notre Dame de la Paix in Abengourou-Plateau from 2011 until 2014.
- Episcopal vicar for the Sector of Moronou and the Central Sector of Abengourou from 2011 until 2014.
- Director of diocesan Catholic Works from 2011 until 2014.
- Diocesan director of the Pontifical Mission Societies from 2011 until 2014.
- Professor at the Grande Séminaire Notre Dame de Guessihio-Gagnoa from 2011 until 2014.
- Parish priest of Christ Roi Parish in Abengourou in 2014.
- Rector of the Grande Séminaire Notre Dame de Guessihio-Gagnoa from 2014 until 2025.
- Rector of the parish-sanctuary of Sainte Famille de Nazareth from 2025 until 2026.
- Director of the Saint Kizito Diocesan Centre of Abengourou from 2025 until 2026.
- Member of the Commission for the Clergy, Seminaries and vocational pastoral care within the Episcopal Conference of Cote d'Ivoire.

== Bishop ==
On 27 February 2026, Pope Leo XIV appointed him bishop of the Catholic Diocese of Agboville. He succeeded Bishop Alexis Youlo Touabli, who was transferred to the Roman Catholic Diocese of San Pedro-en-Côte d'Ivoire, on 22 October 2025. The consecration of the new bishop took place on 18 April 2026. He was consecrated and installed at Agboville, on 18 April 2026 by Mauricio Rueda Beltz, Titular Archbishop of Cingoli assisted by Jean-Jacques Koffi Oi Koffi, Archbishop of Gagnoa and Jean-Pierre Tanoh Tiémélé, Bishop of Abengourou.

== See also ==
- Catholic Church in Ivory Coast

== Succession table ==
Catholic Church titles
Preceded by Alexis Youlo Touabli (14 October 2006 - 22 October 2025)	Bishop of Agboville (since 27 February 2026)	Succeeded by (Incumbent)
