= Joseph Niangoran Teky =

Ivorian Roman Catholic prelate (born 1932)

Rev. Monsignor Joseph Niangoran Teky
- Bishop Emeritus of Man
- Church: Roman Catholic Church
- Archdiocese: Gagnoa
- Diocese: Man
- Installed: 17 December 1992
- Term ended: 18 December 2007
- Predecessor: Bernard Agré
- Successor: Gaspard Béby Gnéba

Orders
- Ordination: 19 March 1961 by Bernard Yago
- Consecration: 14 March 1993 by Bernard Yago, Bernard Agré and Alexandre Kouassi

Personal details
- Born: Joseph Niangoran Teky; 21 December 1932 (age 93) Bonoua, French West Africa (now Ivory Coast)

Joseph Niangoran Teky (born 21 December 1932) is an Ivorian Roman Catholic prelate. He served as the Bishop of the Diocese of Man from 1992 until his retirement in 2007.

== Early life and priesthood ==
Joseph Niangoran Teky was born on 21 December 1932 in Bonoua, Ivory Coast. After studying for the priesthood, he was ordained a priest on 19 March 1961. Following his ordination, he served in various pastoral and diocesan roles within the Archdiocese of Abidjan, where he served as the second Vicar General.

== Episcopate ==
On 17 December 1992, Pope John Paul II appointed Niangoran Teky as the Bishop of the Diocese of Man, succeeding Bernard Agré, who had been appointed Bishop of Yamoussoukro. He received his episcopal consecration on 14 March 1993 from Cardinal Bernard Yago with Bishops Bernard Agré and Alexandre Kouassi serving as co-consecrators.

During his tenure, Niangoran Teky guided his diocese through periods of immense socio-political volatility, particularly before and during the First Ivorian Civil War. The western region of Ivory Coast, where the Diocese of Man is located, experienced significant conflict. In 2000, following the physical assault of local priests and religious sisters by armed militias, Niangoran Teky publicly denounced the prevailing climate of insecurity and lawlessness, appealing to authorities to protect vulnerable communities. He also collaborated with international organizations, such as the United Nations Operation in Côte d'Ivoire (UNOCI), to secure financing for community development and social micro-projects aimed at rehabilitating the war-torn region.

== Retirement ==
On 18 December 2007, Pope Benedict XVI accepted Niangoran Teky's resignation from the pastoral governance of the Diocese of Man, upon him reaching the statutory age limit of 75. He was succeeded by Gaspard Béby Gnéba. Following his retirement, he assumed the title of Bishop Emeritus of Man.
