= Gaspard Béby Gnéba =

Ivorian Catholic prelate (born 1963)

The Most Reverend Gaspard Béby Gnéba
- Auxiliary Bishop of Abidjan, Ivory Coast
- Church: Catholic Church
- Archdiocese: Roman Catholic Archdiocese of Abidjan
- See: Abidjan
- Appointed: 19 February 2026
- Installed: 19 February 2026
- Other posts: Bishop of Man, Ivory Coast (18 December 2007 - 19 February 2026); Apostolic Administrator of Odienné, Ivory Coast (29 May 2019 - 24 September 2022)

Orders
- Ordination: 12 July 1992
- Consecration: 8 March 2008 by Barthélémy Djabla
- Rank: Bishop

Personal details
- Born: Gaspard Béby Gnéba; 6 January 1963 (age 63) Tehiri Guitry, Archdiocese of Gagnoa, Gôh Region, Ivory Coast

Styles of Gaspard Béby Gnéba
- Reference style: Your Lordship; The Most Reverend
- Spoken style: His Lordship
- Religious style: Bishop

Gaspard Béby Gnéba (born 6 January 1963) is an Ivorian Catholic prelate who serves as Auxiliary Bishop of the Roman Catholic Archdiocese of Abidjan in Ivory Coast since 19 February 2026. Before that, from 18 December 2007 until 19 February 2026, he served as the bishop of the Roman Catholic Diocese of Man, Ivory Coast. He was appointed bishop by Pope Benedict XVI. He received his episcopal consecration at Man, Ivory Coast, on 8 March 2008 by the hands of Barthélémy Djabla, Archbishop of Gagnoa. While bishop, from 29 May 2019 until 24 September 2022, he served as Apostolic Administrator of the Roman Catholic Diocese of Odienné, Ivory Coast. Pope Leo XIV transferred him to Abidjan Metropolitan Province on 19 February 2026 and appointed him auxiliary bishop there. He was contemporaneously assigned the Titular See of Putia in Numidia.

== Background and education ==
He was born on 6 January 1963 at Tehiri Guitry, Archdiocese of Gagnoa, Gôh Region, Ivory Coast. He studied philosophy at Yopougon Seminary. He then studied theology at the Abidjan Major Seminary in Abidjan. Later he studied at the Pontifical Theological Faculty Teresianum in Rome, Italy where he earned a Doctorate in spiritual theology.

== Priest ==
He was ordained a priest for the Archdiocese of Gagnoa, Ivory Coast on 12 July 1992. He served as a priest until 18 December 2007. While a priest, he served in various roles and locations, including:

- Parish Vicar at Sainte-Anne Cathedral in Gagnoa Archdiocese.
- Director of a catechetical center in Gagnoa Archdiocese.
- Studies at the Teresianum in Rome, Italy, leading to the award of a doctorate in spiritual theology.
- Lecturer in spiritual theology and Liturgy at the Notre Dame Major Seminary in Gagnoa from 2004 until 2007.

== Bishop ==
On 18 December 2007, Pope Benedict XVI appointed him bishop of the Diocese of Man, Ivory Coast. He was consecrated at Man, Ivory Coast on 8 March 2008 by Barthélémy Djabla, Archbishop of Gagnoa assisted by Joseph Niangoran Teky, Bishop Emeritus of Man and Jean-Pierre Kutwa, Archbishop of Abidjan. While local ordinary at Man, Ivory Coast, Bishop Gaspard Béby Gnéba served as apostolic administrator of the Catholic Diocese of Odienné, Ivory Coast from 29 May 2019 until 24 September 2022.

On 19 February 2026, Pope Leo XIV transferred him to Abidjan Archdiocese and appointed him auxiliary bishop. He concurrently assigned him Titular Bishop of Putia in Numidia.

== See also ==
- Catholic Church in Ivory Coast

== Succession table ==
Catholic Church titles
Preceded by	Auxiliary Bishop of Abidjan (since 19 February 2026)	Succeeded by
Preceded by Joseph Niangoran Teky (17 December 1992 - 18 December 2007)	Bishop of Man, Ivory Coast (18 December 2007 - 19 February 2026)	Succeeded by (Vacant)
