= Alexis Youlo Touabli =

Ivorian Catholic prelate (born 1959)

The Most Reverend Alexis Youlo Touabli
- Bishop of San Pedro-en-Côte d'Ivoire
- Church: Catholic Church
- Archdiocese: Roman Catholic Archdiocese of Gagnoa
- See: Diocese of San Pedro-en-Côte d'Ivoire
- Appointed: 22 October 2025
- Installed: 20 October 2025
- Predecessor: Jean-Jacques Koffi Oi Koffi (Apostolic Administrator)
- Successor: Incumbent
- Other post: Bishop of the Roman Catholic Diocese of Agboville (14 October 2006 - 22 October 2025)

Orders
- Ordination: 8 August 1987 by Noël Kokora-Tekry
- Consecration: 16 December 2006 by Barthélémy Djabla
- Rank: Bishop

Personal details
- Born: Alexis Youlo Touabli; 17 November 1959 (age 67) Bereblo, Tabou Department, San-Pédro Region, Diocese of San Pedro-en-Côte d'Ivoire, Bas-Sassandra District, Ivory Coast
- Motto: "Viens Esprit Saint" (Come, Holy Spirit)

Styles of Alexis Youlo Touabli
- Reference style: Your Lordship; The Most Reverend
- Spoken style: His Lordship
- Religious style: Bishop

Alexis Youlo Touabli (also Alexis Touably Youlo) (born 17 November 1959) is an Ivorian Catholic prelate who was appointed Bishop of the Roman Catholic Diocese of San Pedro-en-Côte d'Ivoire, in Ivory Coast on 22 October 2025. Before that, from 14 October 2006 until 22 October 2025, he was the Bishop of the Roman Catholic Diocese of Agboville, Ivory Coast. He was appointed bishop of Agboville, by Pope Benedict XVI. He was consecrated and installed at Agboville, Diocese of Agboville on 16 December 2006 by Barthélémy Djabla, Archbishop of Gagnoa. On 22 October 2025, Pope Leo XIV transferred him to the Diocese of San Pedro-en-Côte d'Ivoire, Ivory Coast and appointed him the local ordinary there. He was installed at San-Pédro, Ivory Coast, on 20 December 2025.

== Background and education ==
Alexis Youlo Touabli was born on 17 November 1959 at Bereblo, Tabou Department, San-Pédro Region, Diocese of San Pedro-en-Côte d'Ivoire, Bas-Sassandra District, Ivory Coast. This is located in extreme south-western Ivory Coast, close to the border with Liberia. He holds a Licentiate in philosophy from the Catholic Institute of Paris, where he studied from 1992 until 1995. From 1999 until 2001, he studied at the Pontifical University of the Holy Cross, in Rome, Italy, where he graduated with a Licentiate in canon law.

== Priesthood ==
On 8 August 1987, he was ordained a priest of the Archdiocese of Gagnoa. In 1992, he was incardinated in the diocese of San Pedro-en-Côte d'Ivoire. He served as a priest until 14 October 2006. While a priest, he served in various roles including as:

- Teacher in the minor seminary of Gagnoa from 1987 until 1990.
- Teacher in the minor seminary of Yopougon from 1990 until 1992.
- Studies at the Catholic Institute of Paris, leading to the award of a licentiate in philosophy from 1992 until 1995.
- Vicar of the Cathedral of San Pedro from 1995 until 1997.
- Professor in the Daloa Major Seminary from 1997 until 1999.
- Studies at the Pontifical University of the Holy Cross in Rome, Italy, leading to the award of a licentiate in canon law from 1999 until 2001.
- Parish administrator of Saint André, in Sassanra from 2001 until 2002.
- Parish priest of Saint Paul in San Pedro, from 2003 until 2006.
- Vicar general of the diocese of San Pedro in Ivory Coast from 2003 until 2006.

== As bishop ==
On 14 October 2006, Pope Benedict XVI created the Roman Catholic Diocese of Agboville, by taking territory from the Diocese of Yopougon. The new diocese was a made a suffragan of the Ecclesiastical Metropolitan Province of Archdiocese of Abidjan. The Holy Father appointed Father Alexis Youlo Touabli, previously the Vicar General of the diocese of San Pedro-en-Côte d’Ivoire as the pioneer bishop at Agboville.

He was consecrated and installed at Agboville, Ivory Coast on 16 December 2006 by the hands of Barthélémy Djabla, Archbishop of Gagnoa assisted by Laurent Akran Mandjo, Bishop of Yopougon and Boniface Nyema Dalieh, Bishop of Cape Palmas. While local ordinary at Agboville, he served in several concurrent roles including:

- President of the Episcopal Conference of Côte d’Ivoire from 2011 until 2017.
- Apostolic administrator of the Diocese of Yamoussoukro from 19 June 2018 until 19 February 2023.
- Elected president of the Regional Episcopal Conference of West Africa (RECOWA) on 5 May 2022.

On 22 October 2025, Pope Leo XIV transferred Bishop Youlo Alexis Touabli, previously Bishop of Agboville to the diocese of San Pedro-en-Côte d'Ivoire and appointed him the local ordinary there. His installation at San Pedro, Ivory Coast took place on 20 December 2025. He continues to function as Apostolic Administrator of the diocese od Agboville until a suitable bishop is appointed.

== See also ==
- Catholic Church in Ivory Coast

== Succession table ==
Catholic Church titles
Preceded by None (Diocese created)	Bishop of Agboville (14 October 2006 - 22 October 2025)	Succeeded by Vacant (since 22 October 2025)
Preceded by Jean-Jacques Koffi Oi Koffi (3 January 2009 - 8 April 2025)	Bishop of San Pedro-en-Côte d'Ivoire (since 22 October 2025)	Succeeded by Incumbent
