= Pierre-Marie Coty =

Ivorian Catholic priest (1927–2020)

- Bishop of Daloa
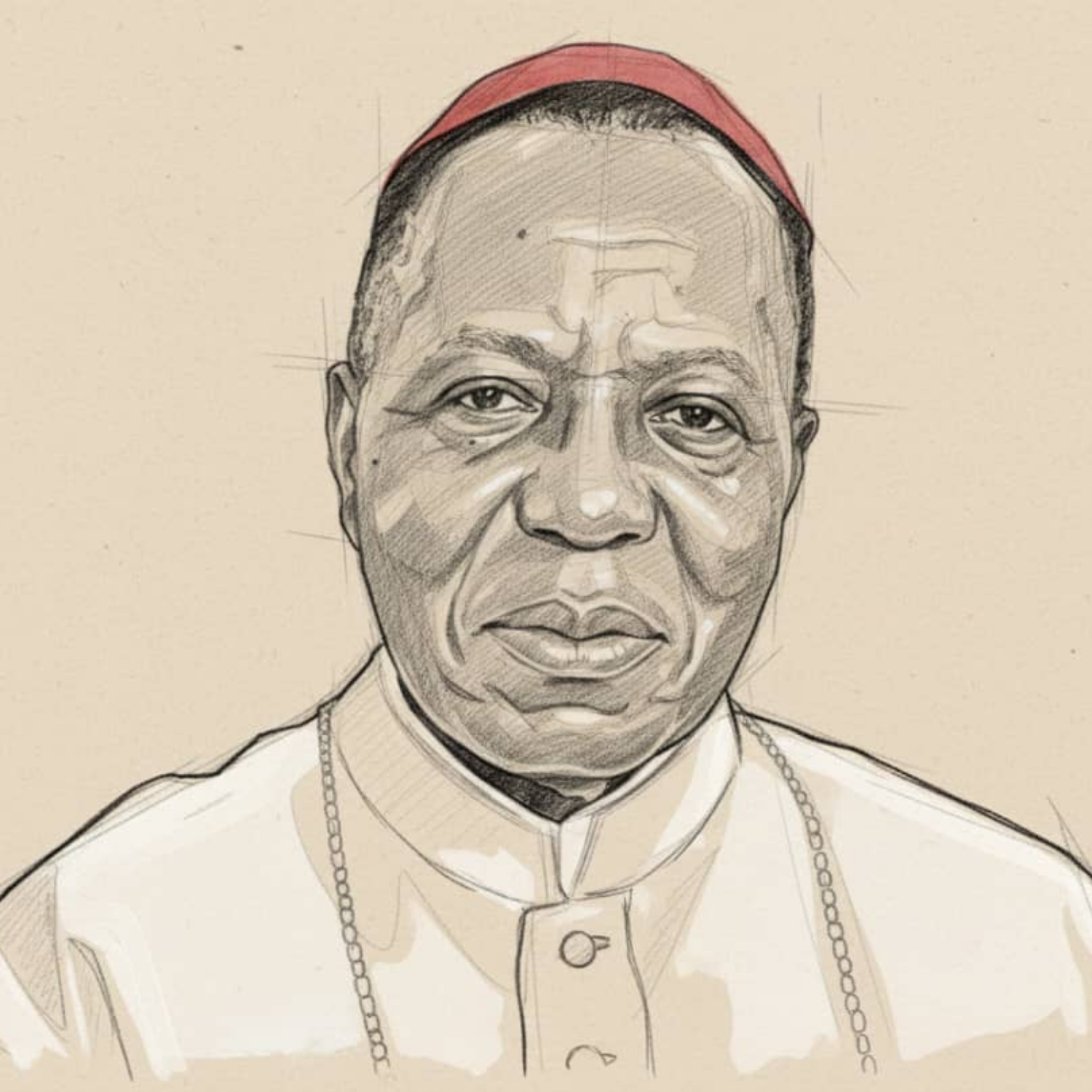
- Church: Catholic Church
- Diocese: Diocese of Daloa
- In office: 20 November 1975 – 22 March 2005
- Predecessor: Pierre-Eugène Rouanet
- Successor: Maurice Konan Kouassi

Orders
- Ordination: 19 July 1955
- Consecration: 4 January 1976 by Bernard Yago

Personal details
- Born: 22 November 1927 Anyama, Colony of Ivory Coast, French West Africa, French Empire
- Died: 17 July 2020 (aged 92) Abidjan, Côte d'Ivoire

Pierre-Marie Coty (22 November 1927 – 17 July 2020) was an Ivorian Roman Catholic bishop.

Coty was born in the Ivory Coast and was ordained to the priesthood in 1955. He served as bishop of the Roman Catholic Diocese of Daloa, Ivory Coast from 1975 to 2005.

== Biography ==
Pierre-Marie Coty is also the author of the lyrics of L'Abidjanaise, the national anthem of Ivory Coast since 1960, while the composer of the music of L'Abidjanaise was Abbé Pierre-Michel Pango.

== Decoration ==

Commander: during the celebrations of the 20th anniversary of the death of Abbé Pierre-Michel Pango, posthumously, and together with Pierre-Marie Coty, they were elevated to the rank of Commander of the National Order.
