= Jean-Pierre Tanoh Tiémélé =

Ivorian Catholic prelate (born 1969)

The Most Reverend Jean-Pierre Tanoh Tiémélé
- Bishop of Abengourou, Côte d'Ivoire
- Church: Catholic Church
- Archdiocese: Roman Catholic Archdiocese of Bouaké
- See: Diocese of Abengourou
- Appointed: 22 October 2025
- Installed: 3 January 2026
- Predecessor: Boniface Ziri Gbaya (1 July 2009 - 22 October 2025)
- Successor: Incumbent

Orders
- Ordination: 29 January 2011
- Consecration: 3 January 2026
- Rank: Bishop

Personal details
- Born: Jean-Pierre Tanoh Tiémélé; 22 February 1969 (age 57) Treichville, Abidjan, Ivory Coast

Styles of Jean-Pierre Tanoh Tiémélé
- Reference style: Your Lordship; The Most Reverend
- Spoken style: His Lordship
- Religious style: Bishop

Jean-Pierre Tanoh Tiémélé (born 22 February 1969) is an Ivorian Catholic prelate who was appointed Bishop of the Roman Catholic Diocese of Abengourou, in Ivory Coast on 22 October 2025. Before that, from 29 January 2011 until 22 October 2025, he was a priest of the Diocese of Grand-Bassam, Ivory Coast. He was appointed bishop by Pope Leo XIV. He was consecrated and installed at Abengourou, Diocese of Abengourou, Ivory Coast on 3 January 2026 by Mauricio Rueda Beltz, Titular Archbishop of Cingoli and Papal Nuncio to the Ivory Coast.

== Background and education ==
He was born on 22 February 1969 in Treichville, a suburb of Abidjan, the largest city in Ivory Coast. After attending elementary and secondary school locally, he studied at the Félix-Houphouët-Boigny University in Abidjan, where he graduated with a Master in Business Administration (MBA) degree. He also obtained a degree in engineering from the École supérieure de commerce Castaing, also in Abidjan. He studied philosophy at the Saint Coer de Marie Seminary in Anyama. He then studied theology at the Saint Paul VI Major Seminary of Abidjan, where he graduated with a licentiate in theology.

== Priesthood ==
On 29 January 2011, he was ordained a priest. He served as a priest until 22 October 2025. While a priest, he served in various roles including as:

- Director general and administrator of the Centre Père Mathieu Ray de Koumassi from 2011 until 2015.
- Diocesan chaplain for Catholic Scouts from 2013 until 2015.
- Advisor of the Diocesan Council for Economic Affairs from 2014 until 2015.
- Secretary for Social Pastoral Care of the Episcopal Conference from 2015 until 2016.
- National executive secretary of Caritas Côte d'Ivoire from 2015 until 2024.
- Sunday vicar of the parish of Ascension de Notre Seigneur Jésus-Christ from 2024 until 2025.

== As bishop ==
On 22 October 2025, Pope Leo XIV appointed him as bishop of the Roman Catholic Diocese of Abengourou, Ivory Coast, a suffragan of the Ecclesiastical Metropolitan Province of Bouaké. He succeeded Bishop Boniface Ziri Gbaya, whose age-related retirement was accepted by The Holy Father on the same day. Bishop Tiémélé was consecrated bishop and installed at Abengourou, Ivory Coast on 3 January 2026.

== See also ==
- Catholic Church in Ivory Coast

== Succession table ==
Catholic Church titles
Preceded by Boniface Ziri Gbaya (1 July 2009 - 22 October 2025)	Bishop of Abengourou (since 22 October 2025)	Succeeded by Incumbent
