= Jean-Pierre Kutwa =

Ivorian Catholic prelate

His Eminence Jean-Pierre Kutwa
- Cardinal; Archbishop Emeritus of Abidjan
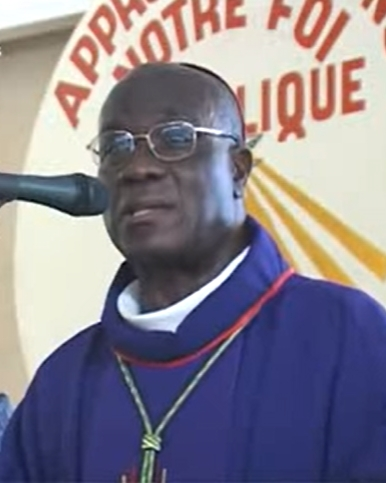
- Cardinal Kutwa.
- Archdiocese: Abidjan
- See: Abidjan
- Appointed: 2 May 2006
- Installed: 18 June 2006
- Term ended: 20 May 2024
- Predecessor: Bernard Agré
- Successor: Ignace Bessi Dogbo
- Other post: Cardinal-Priest of Santa Emerenziana a Tor Fiorenza
- Previous post: Archbishop of Gagnoa (2001–2006)

Orders
- Ordination: 11 July 1971 by Bernard Yago
- Consecration: 16 September 2001 by Bernard Agré
- Created cardinal: 22 February 2014 by Pope Francis
- Rank: Cardinal-Priest

Personal details
- Born: 22 December 1945 (age 80) Blockhauss, Ivory Coast
- Denomination: Roman Catholic
- Motto: Sinite parvulos venire ad me (Let the little children come to me)
- Coat of arms: Jean-Pierre Kutwa's coat of arms

Ordination history of Jean-Pierre Kutwa
History
Episcopal consecration
- Principal consecrator: Bernard Agre
- Co-consecrators: Laurent Akran Mandjo; Barthelemy Djabla
Cardinalate
- Elevated by: Pope Francis

Styles of Jean-Pierre Kutwa
- Reference style: His Eminence
- Spoken style: Your Eminence
- Religious style: Cardinal
- Informal style: Cardinal

Jean-Pierre Kutwa (born 22 December 1945) is an Ivorian Catholic prelate who served as Archbishop of Abidjan from 2006 to 2024. Pope Francis made him a cardinal in 2014.

== Biography ==
Kutwa was born on 22 December 1945 in Blockhauss (Abidjan). He had initial studies the school St Jean-Bosco, Treichville, in 1950; on 18 September 1955, he entered the "Petit-Clerc", Bingerville in class of CMI; in 1957, he entered the Minor Seminary in Bingerville, where he completed his secondary studies. Kutwa is also a composer.

=== Education ===
On 2 October 1964, he entered the Grand Seminary of Anyama, where he studied philosophy and theology; on 22 December 1967, he received the cassock and the ecclesiastical tonsure; he received the diaconate on 20 December 1970, from Archbishop Bernard Yago of Abidjan, in the church of Notre Dame du Perpétuel Secours in Treichville; also, he studied at the Catholic Institute of Occidental Africa (I.C.A.O.), where he obtained a maîtrise in Biblical theology; and at the Pontifical Urbaniana University, Rome, where he earned a doctorate in Biblical theology.

== Priesthood and Episcopate ==
He was ordained a priest on 11 July 1971 by Cardinal Bernard Yago. Pope John-Paul II named him archbishop of the archdiocese of Gagnoa on 15 May 2001. He was consecrated bishop on 16 September by Cardinal Bernard Agré, Archbishop of Abidjan.

He took part in the Synod of Bishops that met at the Vatican in October 2005 as a delegate of the bishops of the Ivory Coast.

In May 2006, Pope Benedict XVI transferred him to the metropolitan see of Abidjan to succeed the retiring Cardinal Agré.

Following the violence in the Ivory Coast that followed the November 2010 elections and ended in April 2011, he called for reconciliation: "Yes, the Ivory Coast must be a land of friendship and brotherhood, from the North or from the South, black or white, from here or elsewhere." In January 2012, speaking on behalf of the National Forum of Religious Groups, he called for Alassane Ouattara, President of the Ivory Coast and a Muslim, to release political prisoners, supporters of his defeated rival for the presidency, in order to facilitate the process of national reconciliation.

Kutwa served as vice-president of the Regional Episcopal Conference of Francophone West Africa.

== Cardinal ==
On 12 January 2014, Pope Francis announced that he would name Kutwa a cardinal at the papal consistory scheduled for 22 February 2014, along with 18 others. He was created Cardinal-Priest of Santa Emerenziana a Tor Fiorenza in February 2014.

In September 2014, he was appointed a member of the Congregation for the Evangelization of Peoples, the Congregation for Institutes of Consecrated Life and Societies of Apostolic Life, the Pontifical Council for the Laity, and the Pontifical Council for Justice and Peace.

Pope Francis accepted his resignation as archbishop of Abidjan on 20 May 2024.

He participated as a cardinal elector in the 2025 papal conclave that elected Pope Leo XIV.

== See also ==
- Cardinals created by Francis

Catholic Church titles
Preceded by Noel Kokora-Tekry	Archbishop of Gagnoa; 15 May 2001-2 May 2006	Succeeded by Barthelemy Djabla
Preceded by Bernard Agre	Archbishop of Abidjan; 2 May 2006–20 May 2024	Succeeded by Ignace Bessi Dogbo
Preceded by Medardo Joseph Mazombwe	Cardinal Priest of Santa Emerenziana a Tor Fiorenza; 22 February 2014–present	Incumbent
