= Félix Kouadjo =

- Bishop of Bondoukou
- Church: Catholic Church
- Diocese: Diocese of Bondoukou
- In office: 22 April 1996 – 6 May 2012
- Predecessor: Alexandre Kouassi
- Successor: Bruno Essoh Yedoh

Orders
- Ordination: 16 March 1969
- Consecration: 20 July 1996 by Laurent Akran Mandjo

Personal details
- Born: 1939 Binao, Colony of Ivory Coast, French West Africa, French Empire
- Died: 6 May 2012 (aged 72–73) Bondoukou, Zanzan District, Ivory Coast

Félix Kouadjo (1939 – 6 May 2012) was the Roman Catholic bishop of the Roman Catholic Diocese of Bondoukou, Côte d'Ivoire.

He was born in the village of Binao in 1939. Ordained to the priesthood in 1969, Kouadjo became a bishop in 1996. He died at the Bondoukou Regional Hospital from cardiac issues while in office.
