= Marie-Daniel Dadiet =

Ivorian Roman Catholic archbishop (1952–2023)

His Excellency Marie-Daniel Dadiet
- Archbishop Emeritus of Korhogo
- Appointed: 12 May 2004
- Term ended: 12 October 2017
- Predecessor: Auguste Nobou
- Successor: Ignace Bessi Dogbo
- Previous posts: Auxiliary Bishop of Korhogo and Titular Bishop of Sitipa (1998–2002); Bishop of Katiola (2002–2004)

Orders
- Ordination: 8 July 1979
- Consecration: 11 October 1998 by Auguste Nobou

Personal details
- Born: 9 September 1952 Bolilié, French West Africa
- Died: 2 October 2023 (aged 71) Paris, France

Marie-Daniel Dadiet (9 September 1952 – 2 October 2023) was an Ivorian clergyman and emeritus Roman Catholic Archbishop of Korhogo.

== Life ==
Marie-Daniel Dadiet was ordained a priest on 8 July 1979.

Dadiet was appointed titular bishop of Sitipa and auxiliary bishop of Korhogo on 22 May 1998 by Pope John Paul II. His consecrators were the Archbishop of Korhogo, Auguste Nobou, Maurice Konan Kouassi, Bishop of Odienné, and Jean-Marie Kélétigui, Bishop of Katiola.

The Pope appointed him Bishop of Katiola on 10 October 2002. He was appointed the second Archbishop of Kohrogo on 12 May 2004.

Pope Francis accepted his early resignation on 12 October 2017.

Dadiet died on 2 October 2023, at the age of 71.

Catholic Church titles
Preceded by Auguste Nobou	Archbishop of Korhogo; 2004–2017	Succeeded by Ignace Bessi Dogbo
Preceded by Jean-Marie Kélétigui	Bishop of Katiola; 2002–2004	Succeeded by Ignace Bessi Dogbo
Preceded by Tulio Duque Gutiérrez	Titular Bishop of Sitipa; 1998–2002	Succeeded by Ignatius C. Wang
Preceded by —	Auxiliary Bishop of Korhogo; 1998–2002	Succeeded by —
