= Diocese of Odienné =

Roman Catholic diocese in Ivory Coast

Coordinates: 9°30′N 7°34′W

Diocese of Odienné Dioecesis Odiennensis

Location
- Country: Côte d'Ivoire
- Metropolitan: Korhogo

Statistics
- Area: 51,220 km^{2} (19,780 sq mi)
- Population: Total; Catholics: (as of 2004); 670,200; 6,700 (1.0%)

Information
- Denomination: Catholic Church
- Sui iuris church: Latin Church
- Rite: Roman Rite
- Established: 19 December 1994; 31 years ago
- Cathedral: Cathedral of Saint-Augustin of Odienné

Current leadership
- Pope: Leo XIV
- Bishop: Alain Clément Amiézi

The Roman Catholic Diocese of Odienné (Latin: Odiennen(sis)) is a diocese located in the city of Odienné in the ecclesiastical province of Korhogo in Côte d'Ivoire.

== History ==
- December 19, 1994: Established as Diocese of Odienné from the Diocese of Daloa, Diocese of Korhogo and Diocese of Man

== Special churches ==
The Cathedral is the Cathédrale Saint-Augustin in Odienné.

== Leadership ==
- Bishops of Odienné (Roman rite)
  - Bishop Maurice Konan Kouassi (1994.12.19 – 2005.03.22), appointed Bishop of Daloa
  - Bishop Salomon Lezoutié (2005.07.29 – 2009.01.03), appointed Coadjutor Bishop of Yopougon
  - Bishop Antoine Koné (2009.07.01 – 2019.05.08)
    - Apostolic Administrator Gaspard Béby Gnéba (2019.05.29 – 2022.09.24), while Bishop of Man
  - Bishop Alain Clément Amiézi (2022.06.30 – Present)

== See also ==
- Roman Catholicism in Côte d'Ivoire
- List of Roman Catholic dioceses in Côte d'Ivoire

== Sources ==
- GCatholic.org
- Catholic Hierarchy
