= Paul-Siméon Ahouanan Djro =

Ivorian Roman Catholic prelate (1952–2024)

His Excellency Paul-Siméon Ahouanan Djro O.F.M.
- Archbishop of Bouaké
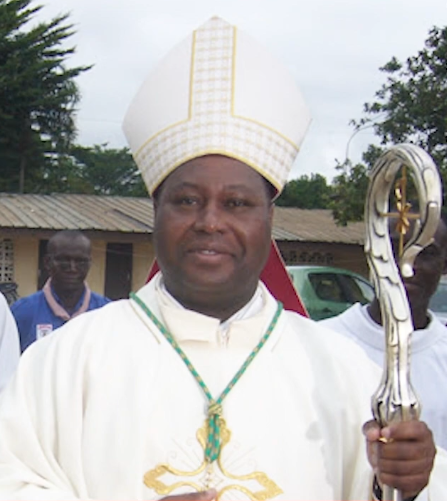
- Installed: 22 September 2006
- Term ended: 12 February 2024
- Predecessor: Vital Komenan Yao
- Successor: Jacques Assanvo Ahiwa
- Previous posts: Bishop of Yamoussoukro (1995–2006); Coadjutor Bishop of Bouaké (2006)

Orders
- Ordination: 19 July 1981
- Consecration: 16 March 1996 by Bernard Yago

Personal details
- Born: 19 December 1952 Bingerville, Colony of Côte d'Ivoire, French West Africa
- Died: 12 February 2024 (aged 71) Abidjan, Ivory Coast
- Motto: Nuntiare Evangelium vitae

Paul-Siméon Ahouanan Djro O.F.M. (19 December 1952 – 12 February 2024) was an Ivorian Roman Catholic prelate. He was bishop of Yamoussoukro from 1996 to 2006 and archbishop of Bouaké from 2006 until his death. Ahouanan Djro died on 12 February 2024, at the age of 71.

Catholic Church titles
Preceded by Vital Komenan Yao	Archbishop of Bouaké; 2006–2024	Succeeded by Vacant
Preceded by Bernard Agré	Bishop of Yamoussoukro; 1995–2006	Succeeded by Joseph Yapo Aké
