= Paulin Kouabénan N'Gnamé =

Ivorian Roman Catholic bishop

- Bishop of San-Pédro
- Church: Catholic Church
- Diocese: Diocese of San-Pédro
- In office: 1 March 2007 – 21 March 2008
- Predecessor: Barthélémy Djabla
- Successor: Jean-Jacques Koffi Oi Koffi

Orders
- Ordination: 6 August 1989
- Consecration: 12 May 2007 by Barthélémy Djabla

Personal details
- Born: 12 May 1962 Mérékou, Côte d'Ivoire
- Died: 21 March 2008 (aged 45)

Paulin Kouabénan N'Gnamé (12 May 1962 − 21 March 2008) was an Ivorian Roman Catholic bishop.

Ordained to the priesthood in 1989, N'Gnamé was named bishop of Roman Catholic Diocese of San Pedro-en-Côte d'Ivoire, Ivory Coast in 2007 and died in 2008 while still in office.
