= Aguia Jean Martial Arnaud Kouamé =

Ivorian Catholic prelate (born 1977)

The Most Reverend Aguia Jean Martial Arnaud Kouamé
- Auxiliary Bishop-Elect of Abidjan, Ivory Coast
- Church: Catholic Church
- Archdiocese: Roman Catholic Archdiocese of Abidjan
- See: Diocese of Abidjan
- Appointed: 13 May 2026
- Installed: 11 July 2026 Expected

Orders
- Ordination: 15 January 2005
- Consecration: 11 July 2026 Expected
- Rank: Bishop

Personal details
- Born: Aguia Jean Martial Arnaud Kouamé; 26 March 1977 (age 49) Abidjan, Archdiocese of Abidjan, Ivory Coast
- Motto: Noli negligere gratiam in te

Styles of Aguia Jean Martial Arnaud Kouamé
- Reference style: Your Lordship; The Most Reverend
- Spoken style: His Lordship
- Religious style: Bishop

Aguia Jean Martial Arnaud Kouamé (born 26 March 1977), is an Ivorian Catholic prelate who was appointed Auxiliary Bishop of the Roman Catholic Archdiocese of Abidjan, Ivory Coast on 13 May 2026. Before that, from 15 January 2005 until 13 May 2026, he served as a priest of the same Ecclesiastical Metropolitan Province. He was appointed by Pope Leo XIV. He was contemporaneously assigned Titular Bishop of Sutunurca. His episcopal consecration is scheduled on 11 July 2026 at Abidjan.

== Early life and education ==
Aguia Jean Martial Arnaud Kouamé was born on 26 March 1977 in Abidjan, Ivory Coast. He studied at the Saint Paul VI University Seminary, in Abidjan, graduating with a licentiate in philosophy and a bachelor's degree in theology. He holds a licentiate in canon law and a Master's degree in philosophy and in history and philosophy of science awarded by the University of Strasbourg, in France. He graduated with a licentiate in moral theology from the University of Lille in France, having studied there from 2012 until 2013. He studied at the University of Strasbourg from 2013 until 2018, graduating with Doctorate in "Ethique, Option Ethique et Religion" (Ethics, Ethics and Religion Option).

== Priest ==
He was ordained a priest for the Archdioese of Abidjan, Côte d'Ivoire on 15 January 2005. He served as a priest until 13 May 2026. While a priest he served in various roles and locations, including:

- Parish vicar of Saint Paul's Cathedral in Abidjan from 2005 until 2008.
- Parish vicar of Saint François d'Assise de la Zinsel in Strasbourg, France from 2008 until 2010.
- Studies in France at the University of Strasbourg, leading to the award of a licentiate in canon law and a master's degree in philosophy and in history and philosophy of science.
- Parish vicar of Bonne Nouvelle in Hem from 2010 until 2011.
- Parish vicar of Saint Fiacre in Dunkerque from 2011 until 2013.
- Studies at the University of Lille, in France leading to the award of a licentiate in moral theology from 2012 until 2013.
- Studies at the University of Strasbourg leading to the award of a doctorate in Ethique, Option Ethique et Religion from 2013 until 2018.
- Parish vicar of Notre Dame du Chêne du Pays de Fleckenstein in Strasbourg from 2013 until 2018.
- Parish priest of Saint François Xavier d'Abobo, Abidjan from 2018 until 2022.
- Parish priest of Saint Ambroise Ma vigne Ma Vie, Abidjan from 2022 untik 2026.

== Bishop ==
On 13 May 2013, Pope Leo XIV appointed him auxiliary bishop of the Roman Catholic Archdiocese of Abidjan. He is expected to work with and assist the Metropoliltan Archbishop Cardinal Ignace Bessi Dogbo, to administer to the faithful in that province. The episcopal concecration of the auxiliary bishop-elect is scheduled for 11 July 2026.

== See also ==
- Catholic Church in Ivory Coast

== Succession table ==
Catholic Church titles
| Preceded by | Auxiliary Bishop of Abidjan (since 13 May 2026) | Succeeded by (Auxiliary Bishop-Elect) |
