= Archdiocese of Korhogo =

Roman Catholic archdiocese in Ivory Coast

Coordinates: 9.4524°N 5.6299°W

Archdiocese of Korhogo Archidiœcesis Korhogoensis

Location
- Country: Ivory Coast

Statistics
- Population: Total; Catholics: (as of 2023); 850,000; 55,057 (6.5%%)
- Parishes: 26

Information
- Established: 15 October 1971; 54 years ago

Current leadership
- Pope: Leo XIV
- Archbishop: Armand Koné

The Roman Catholic Archdiocese of Korhogo (Latin: Korhogoën(sis)) is the Metropolitan See for the ecclesiastical province of Korhogo in Côte d'Ivoire.

== History ==
In 1952, this jurisdiction was changed from prefecture apostolic of Korhogo to vicariate apostolic of Katiola (Father Durrheimer becoming a titular Bishop and continuing as Ordinary), and then became a diocese in 1955. The Korhogo name was revived in 1971 as the name of a diocese, and it became a metropolitan archdiocese in 1994 with Katiola as one of its suffragans.

- 1911.11.17: Established as Apostolic Prefecture of Korhogo from the Apostolic Prefecture of Costa d'Avorio
- 1952.05.15: Suppressed to the Apostolic Vicariate of Katiola
- 1971.10.15: Restored as Diocese of Korhogo from the Diocese of Katiola
- 1994.12.19: Promoted as Metropolitan Archdiocese of Korhogo

== Special churches ==
The seat of the archbishop is the Cathedral of Saint John the Baptist. The church conducts educational programs and meetings with high-ranking guests from the Catholic Church, including archbishop Joseph Spiteri.

== Leadership ==
Prefects Apostolic of Korhogo

- Fr. Emile Durrheimer, S.M.A. (1947.10.17 – 1952.05.15), appointed titular Bishop and Vicar Apostolic of Katiola
- Fr. Louis Wach, S.M.A. (1940.02.09 – 1947)
- Fr. Joseph Diss, S.M.A. (1921.07.08 – 1938)
- Fr. Pietro Maria Kernivinen, S.M.A. (1911 – 1921)

Bishops of Korhogo

- Bishop Auguste Nobou (1971.10.15 – 1994.12.19)

Metropolitan Archbishops of Korhogo

- Archbishop Auguste Nobou (1994.12.19 – 2003.09.25)
- Archbishop Marie-Daniel Dadiet (2004.05.12 - 2017.10.12)
- Archbishop Ignace Bessi Dogbo (2021.01.03 - 2024.05.20)
- Archbishop Armand Koné (2025.03.07 – present)

=== Auxiliary bishop ===
- Marie-Daniel Dadiet (1998-2002), appointed Bishop of Katiola (later returned here as Archbishop)

== Suffragan Dioceses ==
- Katiola
- Odienné

== See also ==
- Roman Catholicism in Côte d'Ivoire
- List of Roman Catholic dioceses in Côte d'Ivoire

== Sources ==
- GCatholic.org
