= Dadiet =

Dadiet is a surname. Notable people with the surname include:

- Marie-Daniel Dadiet (1952–2023), Ivorian clergyman
- Pacôme Dadiet (born 2005), French basketball player
