= Kélétigui =

Kélétigui is both a masculine given name and surname. Notable people with the name include:

== Given name ==
- Kélétigui Diabaté (1931–2012), Malian musician

== Surname ==
- Jean-Marie Kélétigui (1932–2010), Ivorian bishop
