= Diocese of Katiola =

Roman Catholic diocese in Ivory Coast

Coordinates: 8°8′N 5°6′W

Diocese of Katiola Dioecesis Katiolaensis Diocèse de Katiola

Location
- Country: Côte d'Ivoire
- Metropolitan: Archdiocese of Korhogo
- Headquarters: Katiola, Vallée du Bandama District, Côte d'Ivoire

Statistics
- Area: 32,832 km^{2} (12,677 sq mi)
- Population: Total; Catholics: (as of 2023); 1,022,320; 110,000 (10.8%)
- Parishes: 25

Information
- Denomination: Catholic Church
- Sui iuris church: Latin Church
- Rite: Roman Rite
- Established: 17 November 1911; 114 years ago
- Cathedral: Cathédrale Sainte-Jeanne-d'Arc de Katiola
- Secular priests: 51 (42 Diocesan, 9 Religious Orders)

Current leadership
- Pope: Leo XIV
- Bishop: Honoré Beugré Dakpa
- Metropolitan Archbishop: Armand Koné

The Roman Catholic Diocese of Katiola (Latin: Katiolaën(sis)) is a Roman Catholic diocese in the ecclesiastical province of Korhogo in Côte d'Ivoire.

== History ==
- 17 November 1911: Established as Apostolic Prefecture of Korhogo
- 15 May 1952: Elevated as Apostolic Vicariate of Katiola
- 14 September 1955: Promoted as Diocese of Katiola

== Special churches ==
The seat of the bishop is the Cathédrale Jeanne d’Arc in Katiola.

== Leadership ==
Prefects of Korhogo

- Pierre Kernivinen, S.M.A. (16 January 1912 – 1919), resigned
- Joseph Diss, S.M.A. (8 July 1921 – 1 October 1938), resigned
- Edmond Édouard Wolff, S.M.A. (7 January 1939 – 4 August 1939)
- Louis Wach, S.M.A. (9 February 1940 – 26 April 1947), resigned
- Émile Durrheimer, S.M.A. (17 October 1947 – 15 May 1952 see below)

Vicar Apostolic of Katiola

- Émile Durrheimer, S.M.A. (see above 15 May 1952 – 14 September 1955 see below)

Bishops of Katiola

- Émile Durrheimer, S.M.A. (see above 14 September 1955 – 7 July 1977), resigned
- Jean-Marie Kélétigui (7 July 1977 – 10 October 2002), resigned
- Marie-Daniel Dadiet (10 October 2002 – 12 May 2004), appointed Archbishop of Korhogo
- Ignace Bessi Dogbo (19 May 2004 – 3 January 2021), appointed Archbishop of Korhogo
- Honoré Beugré Dakpa (13 May 2023 – Present)

Other priests of this diocese who became bishop

- Antoine Koné (1991-2009), appointed Bishop of Odienné in 2009

== See also ==
- Roman Catholicism in Côte d'Ivoire
- List of Roman Catholic dioceses in Côte d'Ivoire
