= St. Ann Cathedral, Gagnoa =

Coordinates: 6.1251°N 5.9431°W

St. Ann Cathedral
- Cathédrale Sainte-Anne de Gagnoa
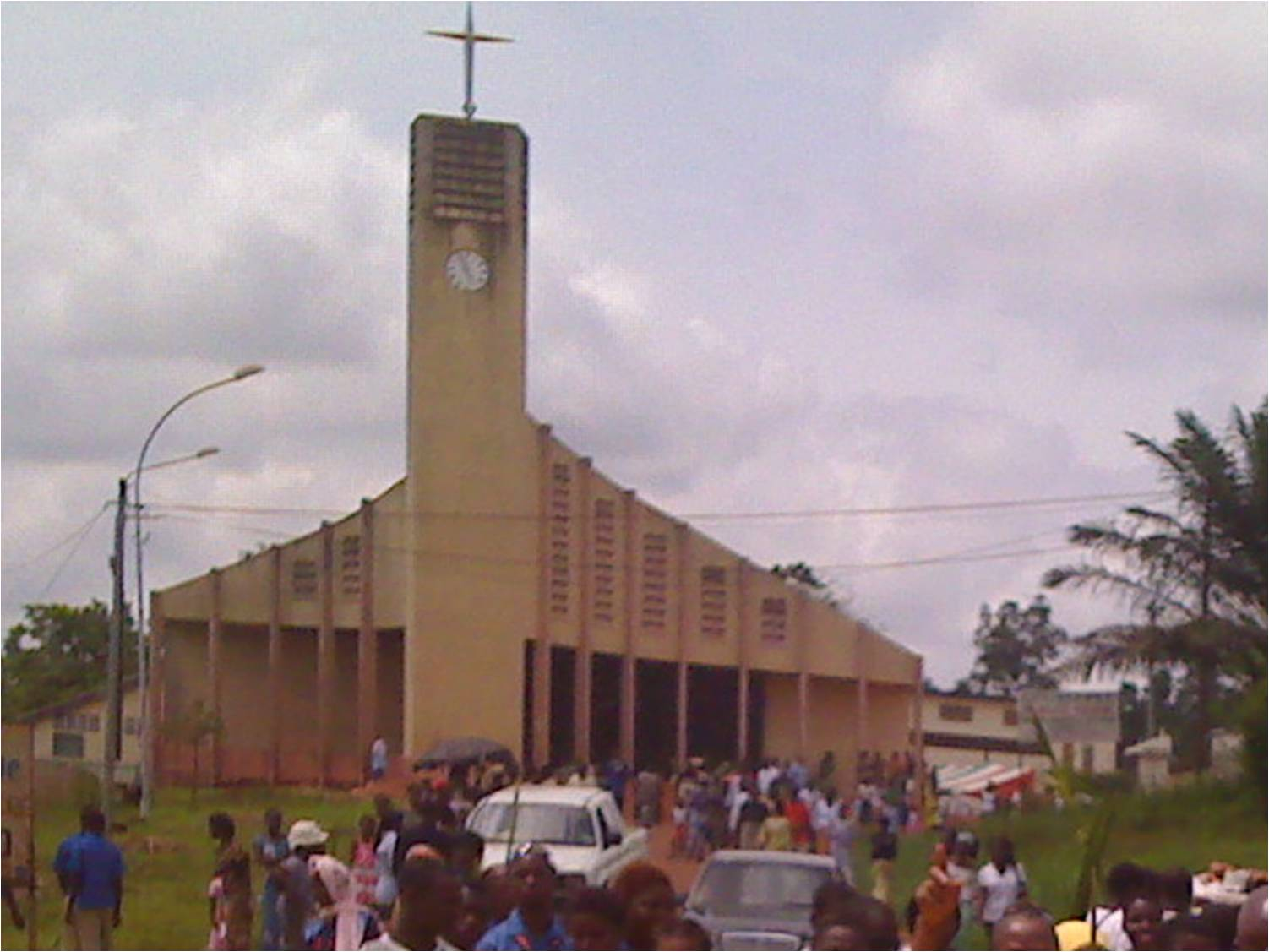
- St. Ann Cathedral
- Location: Gagnoa
- Country: Ivory Coast
- Denomination: Roman Catholic Church

The St. Ann Cathedral (French: Cathédrale Sainte-Anne de Gagnoa) is located in the town of Gagnoa, in Ivory Coast, Africa, and it is one of the country's most important religious buildings. It was a parish church that became a cathedral of the Roman Catholic Church on February 3, 1957. Monsignor Barthélémy Djabla was buried here in 2008.

St. Ann Cathedral serves as the center of the Archdiocese of Gagnoa (Archidiocèse de Gagnoa; Archidioecesis Gagnoaënsis), which is one of the four existing in Ivory Coast, and the center of the ecclesiastical province of Gagnoa.

On June 21, 2023, the church was stormed by demonstrators protesting the mismanagement of resources by Archbishop Joseph Yako Ape, who subsequently retired.

== History ==
=== Early history and construction ===
The St. Ann Cathedral originated as a parish church in Gagnoa during the period of French colonial administration in Ivory Coast. The Catholic mission in the Gagnoa region was established as part of broader evangelization efforts in West Africa during the early-to-mid 20th century. The church was dedicated to Saint Anne, the mother of the Virgin Mary, reflecting the French Catholic missionary influence in the region.

=== Elevation to cathedral status (1957) ===
On February 3, 1957, the parish church was elevated to the status of cathedral following the establishment of the Diocese of Gagnoa. This elevation corresponded with the reorganization of the Catholic Church hierarchy in Ivory Coast, which was approaching independence from France (achieved in 1960). The cathedral became the seat of the bishop of Gagnoa, marking the city's importance as a regional religious center in central Ivory Coast.

=== Late 20th century development ===
Following Ivory Coast's independence in 1960, the cathedral continued to serve as the mother church of the Gagnoa diocese. The cathedral later became part of the newly elevated Archdiocese of Gagnoa when it was raised to metropolitan status, becoming one of four archdioceses in the country.

=== Burial of Monsignor Djabla (2008) ===
In 2008, the cathedral served as the burial site for Monsignor Barthélémy Djabla, a notable religious figure in the region. His interment at the cathedral underscored the church's role as a significant religious and ceremonial site for the Catholic community in Gagnoa and the broader Gagnoa ecclesiastical province.

=== 2023 protest incident ===
On June 21, 2023, the cathedral became the site of civil unrest when demonstrators stormed the building in protest against alleged mismanagement of resources by Archbishop Joseph Yako Ape. The incident resulted in the subsequent retirement of Archbishop Yako Ape and highlighted ongoing tensions between church leadership and local communities regarding transparency and governance of religious institutions in Ivory Coast.

=== Current status ===
The St. Ann Cathedral currently serves as the seat of the Archdiocese of Gagnoa and remains one of the most important religious buildings in Ivory Coast. The cathedral continues to function as the center of the ecclesiastical province of Gagnoa, overseeing Catholic religious life in the region.

== See also ==
- Roman Catholicism in Ivory Coast
