= Armand Koné =

Ivorian Catholic prelate (born 1969)

- Archbishop of the Archdiocese of Korhogo, Ivory Coast
- Church: Catholic Church
- Archdiocese: Roman Catholic Archdiocese of Korhogo
- See: Korhogo
- Appointed: 7 March 2025
- Predecessor: Ignace Bessi Dogbo

Orders
- Ordination: 11 October 2008
- Consecration: 5 April 2025 by Ignace Bessi Dogbo

Personal details
- Born: Armand Koné; 29 July 1969 (age 56) Kouto, Bagoué Region, Ivory Coast

Styles of Armand Koné
- Reference style: Your Eminence; The Most Reverend
- Spoken style: His Eminence
- Religious style: Archbishop

Armand Koné (born 29 July 1969) is an Ivorian Roman Catholic prelate who is currently archbishop of the Roman Catholic Archdiocese of Korhogo, in Ivory Coast. He was appointed bishop by Pope Francis on 7 March 2025. Previously, he served as a priest of that same Catholic See from 11 October 2008 until 7 March 2025. He was consecrated and installed at Korhogo on 5 April 2025 by the hands of Cardinal Ignace Bessi Dogbo, Archbishop of Abidjan.

== Background and education ==
He was born in Kouto, Bagoué Region, Ivory Coast, on 29 July 1969. He studied philosophy at the Grand Séminaire Saint Pierre de Daloa in Daloa. He then studied theology at the Grand Séminaire National Saint Coeur de Marie d'Anyama in Anyama.

== Priest ==
Armand Koné was ordained a priest on 11 October 2008, for the Archdiocese of Korhogo. He served as a priest until 7 March 2025. While a priest, he served in various roles and locations including:

- Vicar of the Cathédrale Saint-Jean-Baptiste, Korhogo from 2008 until 2009.
- Parish priest of Immaculée Conception, Guiembé from 2009 until 2010.
- Head of vocational pastoral care and chaplain of Animation Rurale, Korhogo from 2009 until 2012.
- Military chaplain from 2009 until 2013.
- Parish priest of Sainte Odile, Sinématiali from 2010 until 2012.
- Vicar General of Korhogo from 2010 until 2013.
- Parish priest of Saint Michel Archange, Dikodougou from 2012 until 2013.
- Parish priest of Chaource, Diocese of Troyes, France from 2014 until 2020.
- Vicar forane of Bandama Urbain from 2020 until 2022.
- Parish priest of Notre Dame des Victoires, Korhogo from 2020 until 2025.
- Vicar general of the metropolitan archdiocese of Korhogo from 2022 until 2025.
- Vicar delegate of Korhogo from 2024 until 2025.

== Bishop ==
On 7 March 2025, Pope Francis appointed him archbishop of the Ecclasiatical Metropolitan Province of Korhogo. He succeeded Archbishop Ignace Cardinal Bessi Dogbo who was transferred to Abidjan Archdiocese on 20 May 2024.

Archbishop Armand Koné was consecrated and installed at Korhogo, on 5 April 2025 by the hands of Cardinal Ignace Bessi Dogbo, Archbishop of Abidjan assisted by Mauricio Rueda Beltz, Titular Archbishop of Cingoli and Alain Clément Amiézi, Bishop of Odienné.

== See also ==
- Catholic Church in Ivory Coast

== Succession table ==
Catholic Church titles
Preceded by Ignace Bessi Dogbo (3 January 2021 - 20 May 2024)	Archbishop of Korhogo (since 7 March 2025)	Succeeded by Incumbent
