= Marcellin Yao Kouadio =

- Bishop of Daloa
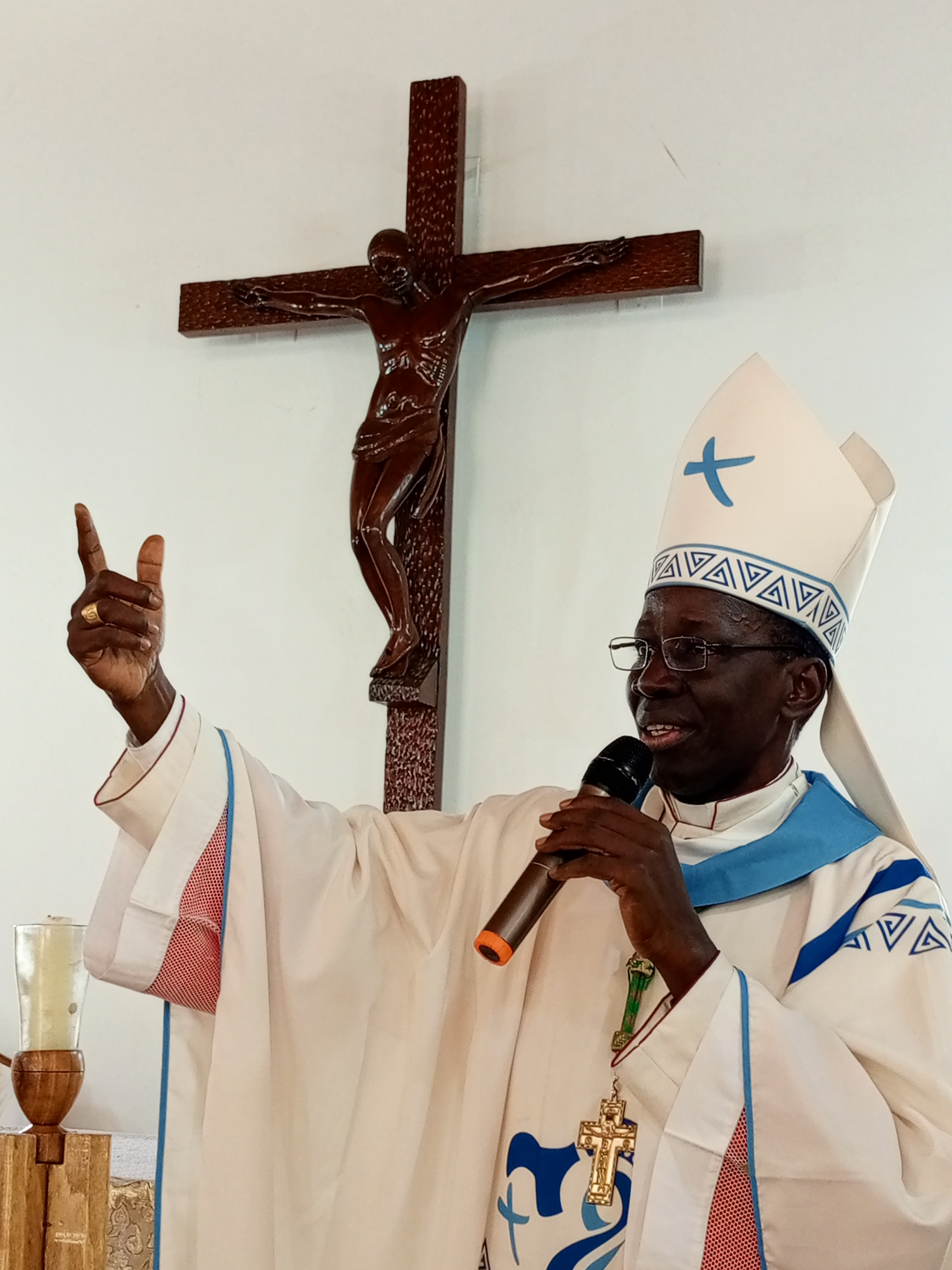
- Marcellin Yao Kouadio in April 2023
- Church: Catholic Church
- Diocese: Diocese of Daloa
- Appointed: 25 April 2018
- Predecessor: Maurice Konan Kouassi
- Previous post: Bishop of Yamoussoukro (2009-2018)

Orders
- Ordination: 29 December 1990
- Consecration: 22 August 2009 by Bernard Agré

Personal details
- Born: Yao Kouadio Marcellin; 10 January 1960 (age 66) Vavoua, Colony of Ivory Coast, French Empire

Marcellin Yao Kouadio, (born 10 January 1960), is an Ivorian Catholic prelate who is the bishop of the Diocese of Daloa since 2018. On 4 June 2023, he became president of the Catholic Bishops' Conference of Côte d'Ivoire.

== Background and priesthood ==
Marcellin Yao Kouadio was born on 10 January 1960, in Vavoua in the Haut-Sassandra region, in the central-western part of Côte d'Ivoire. He is of Ivorian nationality. After completing his primary education, he moved to the city of Daloa and finally to Collège Saint-Viateur in Bouaké, where he completed his secondary education. Marcellin Yao Kouadio first entered the major seminary of philosophy in Abadjin-Kouté (Abidjan), then studied theology at the major seminary in Anyama.

On 1 July 2009, Pope Benedict XVI appointed him bishop of the Diocese of Yamoussoukro and he was ordained 22 August 2009, by Cardinal Bernard Agré.

On 25 April 2018, Pope Francis reappointed him as the ordinary bishop of the Diocese of Daloa. He succeeded Maurice Konan Kouassi.
