= Diocese of Agboville =

Roman Catholic diocese in Côte d'Ivoire

Coordinates: 5°56′N 4°13′W

Diocese of Agboville Dioecesis Agbovillensis

Location
- Country: Côte d'Ivoire
- Metropolitan: Abidjan
- Headquarters: Agboville, Côte d'Ivoire

Statistics
- Area: 11,811 km^{2} (4,560 sq mi)
- Population: Total; Catholics: (as of 2023); 1,199,460; 797,580 (66.5%)
- Parishes: 51

Information
- Denomination: Catholic Church
- Sui iuris church: Latin Church
- Rite: Roman Rite
- Established: 14 October 2006; 19 years ago
- Cathedral: Cathédrale Saint Jean-Marie Vianney d'Agboville
- Secular priests: 117

Current leadership
- Pope: Leo XIV
- Bishop: Darius Assandé Ekou
- Metropolitan Archbishop: Ignace Bessi Dogbo
- Bishops emeritus: Alexis Youlo Touabli

The Roman Catholic Diocese of Agboville (Latin: Agbovillen(sis)) is a diocese located in the city of Agboville in the ecclesiastical province of Abidjan in Côte d'Ivoire.

== History ==
- 14 October 2006: Established as Diocese of Agboville from the Diocese of Yopougon

== Special churches ==
The Cathedral is the Cathédrale Sainte-Jean-Marie-Vianney in Agboville.

== Leadership ==
- Bishops of Agboville (Roman rite)
  - Bishop Alexis Youlo Touabli (14 October 2006 – 22 October 2025), appointed Bishop of San-Pédro, Côte d'Ivoire
    - Apostolic Administrator Alexis Youlo Touabli (22 October 2025 – 18 April 2026)
  - Bishop Darius Assandé Ekou (27 February 2026 – Present)

== See also ==
- Roman Catholicism in Côte d'Ivoire
- List of Roman Catholic dioceses in Côte d'Ivoire

== Sources ==
- GCatholic.org
- Catholic Hierarchy
