= Diocese of Abengourou =

Roman Catholic diocese in Côte d'Ivoire

Coordinates: 6°44′N 3°29′W

Diocese of Abengourou Dioecesis Abenguruensis

Location
- Country: Côte d’Ivoire
- Metropolitan: Bouaké

Statistics
- Area: 18,214 km^{2} (7,032 sq mi)
- Population: Total; Catholics: (as of 2006); 600,500; 295,000 (49.1%)

Information
- Rite: Latin Rite

Current leadership
- Pope: Leo XIV
- Bishop: Jean-Pierre Tanoh Tiémélé
- Bishops emeritus: Boniface Ziri Gbaya

The Roman Catholic Diocese of Abengourou (Latin: Abenguruen(sis)) is a diocese located in the city of Abengourou in the ecclesiastical province of Bouaké in Côte d'Ivoire.

== History ==
- September 13, 1963: Established as Diocese of Abengourou from the Metropolitan Archdiocese of Abidjan, Diocese of Bouaké and Diocese of Katiola

== Special churches ==
The Cathedral is the Cathédrale Sainte Thérèse de l’enfant Jésus in Abengourou.

== Leadership, in reverse chronogical order ==
- Bishops of Abengourou (Roman rite), below
  - Bishop Jean-Pierre Tanoh Tiémélé (since 22 October 2025)
  - Bishop Boniface Ziri Gbaya (1 July 2009 - 22 October 2025)
  - Bishop Jean-Jacques Koffi Oi Koffi (21 November 2003 - 3 January 2009), appointed Bishop of San Pedro-en-Côte d'Ivoire
  - Bishop Bruno Kouamé (26 March 1981 – 21 November 2003)
  - Bishop Laurent Yapi (12 January 1979 – 17 August 1980)
  - Bishop Eugène Abissa Kwaku (13 September 1963 – 10 August 1978)

== See also ==
- Roman Catholicism in Côte d'Ivoire
- List of Roman Catholic dioceses in Côte d'Ivoire

== Sources ==
- GCatholic.org
- Catholic Hierarchy
