= Akichi =

Akichi is a surname. Notable people with the surname include:

- Edmond Akichi (born 1990), Ivorian footballer
- Joseph Akichi (born 1933), Ivorian clergyman
