= List of Catholic dioceses in Ivory Coast =

The Roman Catholic Church in Côte d'Ivoire is composed of 4 ecclesiastical provinces and 11 suffragan dioceses.

== List of dioceses ==
=== Episcopal Conference of Côte d’Ivoire ===
==== Ecclesiastical Province of Abidjan ====
- Archdiocese of Abidjan
  - Diocese of Agboville
  - Diocese of Grand-Bassam
  - Diocese of Yopougon

==== Ecclesiastical Province of Bouaké ====
- Archdiocese of Bouaké
  - Diocese of Abengourou
  - Diocese of Bondoukou
  - Diocese of Yamoussoukro

==== Ecclesiastical Province of Gagnoa ====
- Archdiocese of Gagnoa
  - Diocese of Daloa
  - Diocese of Man
  - Diocese of San Pedro-en-Côte d'Ivoire

==== Ecclesiastical Province of Korhogo ====
- Archdiocese of Korhogo
  - Diocese of Katiola
  - Diocese of Odienné
