= Kossihouen =

- Village
- Location in Ivory Coast
- Coordinates: 5°31′N 4°17′W
- Country: Ivory Coast
- District: Abidjan
- Sub-prefecture: Songon
- Time zone: UTC+0 (GMT)

Kossihouen is a village in southern Ivory Coast. It is located in the sub-prefecture of Songon in the Autonomous District of Abidjan. Prior to 2011, it was in the Abidjan Department, Lagunes Region.

Kossihouen was a commune until March 2012, when it became one of 1,126 communes nationwide that were abolished.
