= Pierre Fakhoury =

Lebanese/Ivorian architect

Pierre Fakhoury (born 1943 in Dabou) is a Lebanese/Ivorian architect. He graduated at the School of Architecture at Tournai, Belgium.

His notable work includes the Basilica of Our Lady of Peace in Yamoussoukro, Côte d'Ivoire. The Palais du bord de mer of Gabon was designed by him.

Since 1983, Fakhoury has been involved in the relocation of the capital of Côte d'Ivoire from Abidjan to Yamoussoukro. His daughter in law, Cécile Fakhoury, is a gallery owner who opened three locations for her eponymous gallery in Abidjan, Dakar, and Paris.
