= Joseph Akichi =

Ivorian clergyman and bishop

- Bishop of Grand-Bassam
- Church: Catholic Church
- Diocese: Diocese of Grand-Bassam
- In office: 8 June 1982 – 5 April 1993
- Predecessor: Diocese erected
- Successor: Paul Dacoury-Tabley

Orders
- Ordination: 25 March 1963
- Consecration: 18 September 1982 by Bernard Yago

Personal details
- Born: 1933 Memni, Colony of Ivory Coast, French West Africa, French Empire
- Died: 5 April 1993 (aged 59–60)

Joseph Akichi (1933 – 5 April 1993) was an Ivorian clergyman and bishop for the Roman Catholic Diocese of Grand-Bassam. He became ordained in 1963. He was appointed bishop in 1982. He died in 1993.
