= Jean-Jacques Koffi Oi Koffi =

Ivorian Catholic prelate (born 1962

The Most Reverend Jean-Jacques Koffi Oi Koffi
- Archbishop of Gagnoa, Ivory Coast
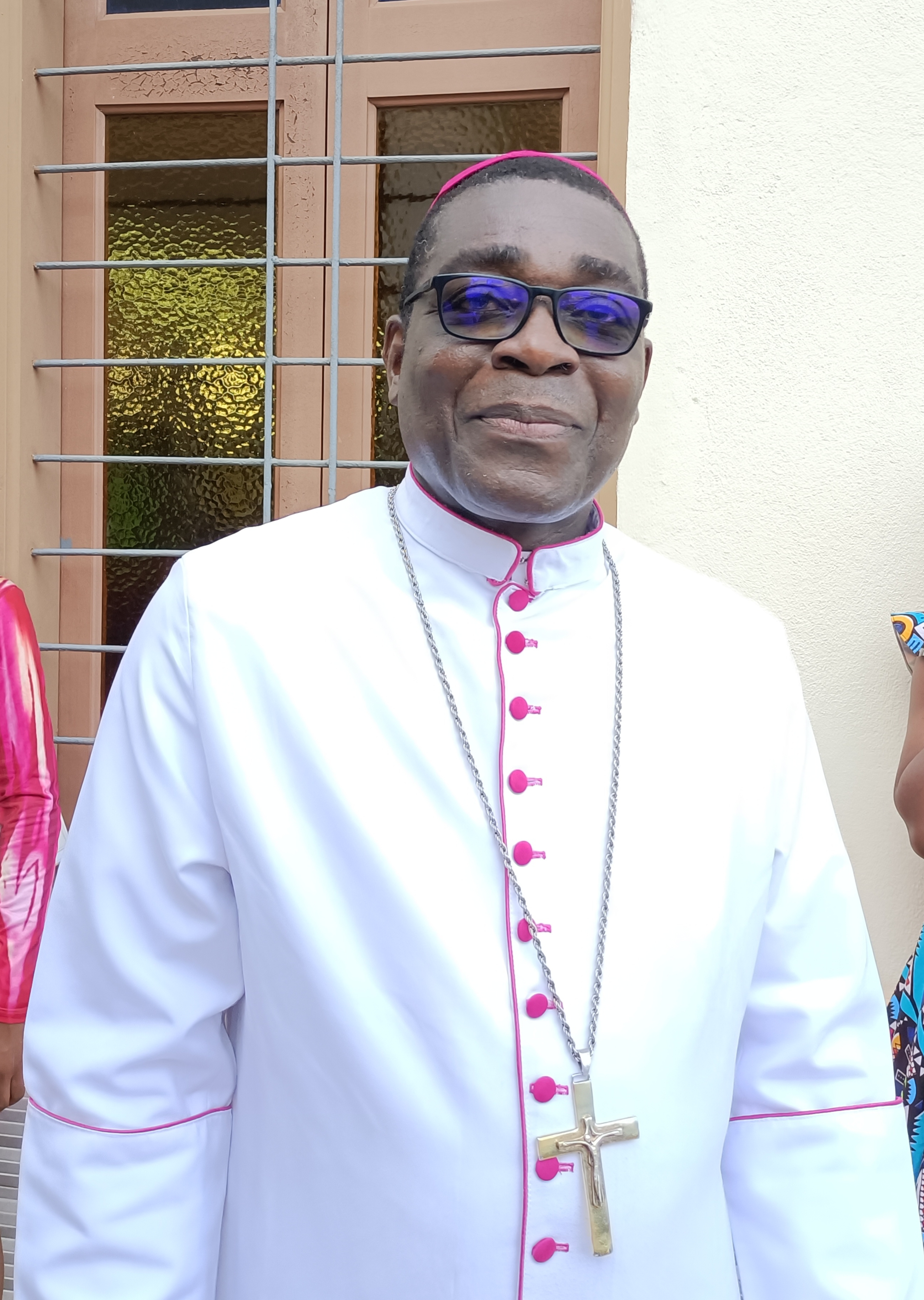
- Archbishop Jean-Jacques Koffi Oi Koffi
- Church: Catholic Church
- Archdiocese: Roman Catholic Archdiocese of Gagnoa
- See: Gagnoa
- Appointed: 8 April 2025
- Installed: 17 May 2025
- Predecessor: Joseph Yapo Aké
- Successor: Incumbent

Orders
- Ordination: 4 August 1990
- Consecration: 21 December 2003 by Bruno Kouamé
- Rank: Archbishop

Personal details
- Born: Jean-Jacques Koffi Oi Koffi; 22 March 1962 (age 64) Bongouanou, Moronou Region, Ivory Coast

Styles of Jean-Jacques Koffi Oi Koffi
- Reference style: Your Lordship; The Most Reverend
- Spoken style: His Lordship
- Religious style: Bishop

Jean-Jacques Koffi Oi Koffi, (born 22 March1962) is an Ivorian Catholic prelate who serves as the Archbishop of the Roman Catholic Archdiocese of Gagnoa, in Ivory Coast. He was appointed to that position on 8 April 2025 and was installed at Gagnoa on 17 May 2025. Before that, from 3 January 2009 until 8 April 2025, he was the Bishop of the Diocese of San-Pédro in Ivory Coast. He previously served as the Bishop of the Diocese of Abengourou, Ivory Coast from 21 November 2003 until 3 January 2009. He was appointed bishop on 21 November 2003 by Pope John Paul II. He received his episcopal consecration on 21 December 2003 at Abengourou, by the hands of Bruno Kouamé, Bishop Emeritus of Abengourou.

== Background and education ==
He was born on 22 March 1962 in Bongouanou, Moronou Region, in Ivory Coast. He studied both philosophy and theology at seminary. He holds a Licentiate in canon law, awarded by the Pontifical Urban University in Rome, Italy.

== Priest ==
He was ordained a priest on 4 August 1990, for the Diocese of Abengourou. He served as a priest until 21 November 2003. While a priest, he served in various capacities and locations including:

- Parish vicar and diocesan head of catechesis for children.
- Parish priest.
- Vicar General and spiritual assistant of the Association of Christian Families.
- President of the diocesan ecclesiastical tribunal of first instance.

== Bishop ==
On 21 November 2003, Pope John Paul II appointed him bishop of the Diocese of Abengourou. He was consecrated and installed at Abengourou on 21 December 2003 by the hands of Bruno Kouamé, Bishop Emeritus of Abengourou assisted by Mario Zenari, Titular Archbishop of Iulium Carnicum and Paul Dacoury-Tabley, Bishop of Grand-Bassam.

On 3 January 2009 Pope Benedict XVI, transferred him to the Diocese of San-Pédro. He served there until 8 April 2025. While a bishop at San-Pédro, he concurrent served as Apostolic Administrator of the Archdiocese of Gagnoa from 4 October 2023 until 8 April 2025. On that day, Pope Francis transferred to Gagnoa and appointed Ecclesiastical Metropolitan Archbishop of the Archdiocese of Gagnoa. He was installed there on 17 May 2025. While archbishop at Gagnoa, he was apostolic administrator of the Diocese of San-Pédro from 8 April 2025 until 20 December 2025.

== See also ==
- Catholic Church in Ivory Coast

== Succession table ==
Catholic Church titles
Preceded by Bruno Kouamé (26 March 1981 - 21 November 2003)	Bishop of Abengourou (21 November 2003 - 3 January 2009)	Succeeded by Gbaya Boniface Ziri (1 July 2009 - 22 October 2025)
Preceded by Paulin Kouabénan N`Gnamé (1 March 2007 - 21 March 2008)	Bishop of San-Pédro (3 January 2009 - 8 April 2025)	Succeeded by Alexis Youlo Touabli (since 22 October 2025)
Preceded by Joseph Aké Yapo (22 November 2008 - 4 October 2023)	Archbishop of Gagnoa (since 8 March 2025)	Succeeded by Incumbent
