= Diocese of Bondoukou =

Roman Catholic diocese in Côte d'Ivoire

Coordinates: 8°2′N 2°48′W

Diocese of Bondoukou Dioecesis Bondukuensis

Location
- Country: Côte d'Ivoire
- Metropolitan: Bouaké

Statistics
- Area: 40,000 km^{2} (15,000 sq mi)
- Population: Total; Catholics: (as of 2006); 680,000; 97,800 (14.4%)

Information
- Rite: Latin Rite

Current leadership
- Pope: Leo XIV
- Bishop: Bruno Essoh Yedoh

Sainte-Odile Cathedral of the Bondoukou Diocese

The Roman Catholic Diocese of Bondoukou (Latin: Bondukuen(sis)) is a diocese located in the city of Bondoukou in the ecclesiastical province of Bouaké in Côte d'Ivoire. It was established on July 3, 1987. Its cathedral is the Cathédrale Saints Odile in Bondoukou. The first two Bishops of Bondoukou (Roman rite) were Alexandre Kouassi (August 28, 1987 – December 12, 1994) and Félix Kouadjo (April 22, 1996 – May 6, 2012). The current bishop was appointed on June 28, 2019.

== Bishops ==
=== Ordinaries ===
- Alexandre Kouassi (1987-1994)
- Félix Kouadjo (1996-2012)
- Bruno Essoh Yedoh (2019- )

=== Other priest of this diocese who became bishop ===
- Paulin Kouabénan N`Gnamé, appointed Bishop of San Pedro-en-Côte d'Ivoire in 2007

== See also ==
- Roman Catholicism in Côte d'Ivoire
- List of Roman Catholic dioceses in Côte d'Ivoire

== Sources ==
- GCatholic.org
- Catholic Hierarchy
