= Antoine Koné =

Ivorian Roman Catholic bishop (1963–2019)

- Bishop of Odienné
- Church: Catholic Church
- Diocese: Diocese of Odienné
- In office: 1 June 2009 – 8 May 2019
- Predecessor: Jean Salomon Lezoutié
- Successor: Alain Clément Amiézi

Orders
- Ordination: 28 December 1991
- Consecration: 22 August 2009 by Bernard Agré

Personal details
- Born: 10 January 1963 Ferkessédougou, Côte d'Ivoire
- Died: 8 May 2019 (aged 56)

Antoine Koné (10 January 1963 – 8 May 2019) was an Ivorian Roman Catholic bishop.

Koné was born in the Republic of the Ivory Coast and was ordained to the priesthood on 28 December 1991. He taught French literature, Latin, and theology at Saint John's Seminary (Katiola) in Ivory Coast during the early 1990s. He served as bishop of the Roman Catholic Diocese of Odienné, Ivory Coast, from 2009 until his death in 2019.
