= Laurent Akran Mandjo =

Ivorian Roman Catholic bishop (1940–2020)

Monsignor Laurent Akran Mandjo
- Bishop emeritus of Yopougon
- Installed: 8 June 1982
- Term ended: 28 November 2015
- Predecessor: position established

Orders
- Ordination: 11 July 1971
- Consecration: 18 September 1982 by Bernard Yago

Personal details
- Born: 5 November 1940 Songon, French West Africa
- Died: 25 August 2020 (aged 79) Abidjan, Ivory Coast
- Motto: Non ministrari sed ministrare
- Coat of arms

Laurent Akran Mandjo (5 November 1940 – 25 August 2020) was an Ivorian Roman Catholic bishop. He served as Bishop of Yopougon from 1982 to 2015.

== Biography ==
Mandjo was ordained a priest on 11 July 1971 by Monsignor Bernard Yago in the Diocese of Abidjan. He served as a vicar in Memni, then in Plateau. From 1978 to 1982, he studied Canon law at the Pontifical Urban University in Rome, where he obtained a doctoral degree. He defended a thesis titled L'éducation chrétienne des jeunes en Côte d'Ivoire à la lumière du magistère récent de l'Église.

The Diocese of Yopougon was created in 1982 and Mandjo was selected to be its first bishop by Pope John Paul II. He was consecrated on 18 September 1982 by Yago, assisted by Justo Mullor García and Bernard Agré. He became President of the Conférence des évêques catholiques de Côte d'Ivoire, serving from 2002 to 2008. He retired as Bishop of Yopougon in 2015.

Laurent Akran Mandjo died on 25 August 2020 in Abidjan at the age of 79.
