= Santa Emerenziana a Tor Fiorenza =

Church of Saint Emerentiana on Tor Fiorenza
- Santa Emerenziana a Tor Fiorenza (in Italian); S. Emerentianae ad locum vulgo Tor Fiorenza (in Latin)
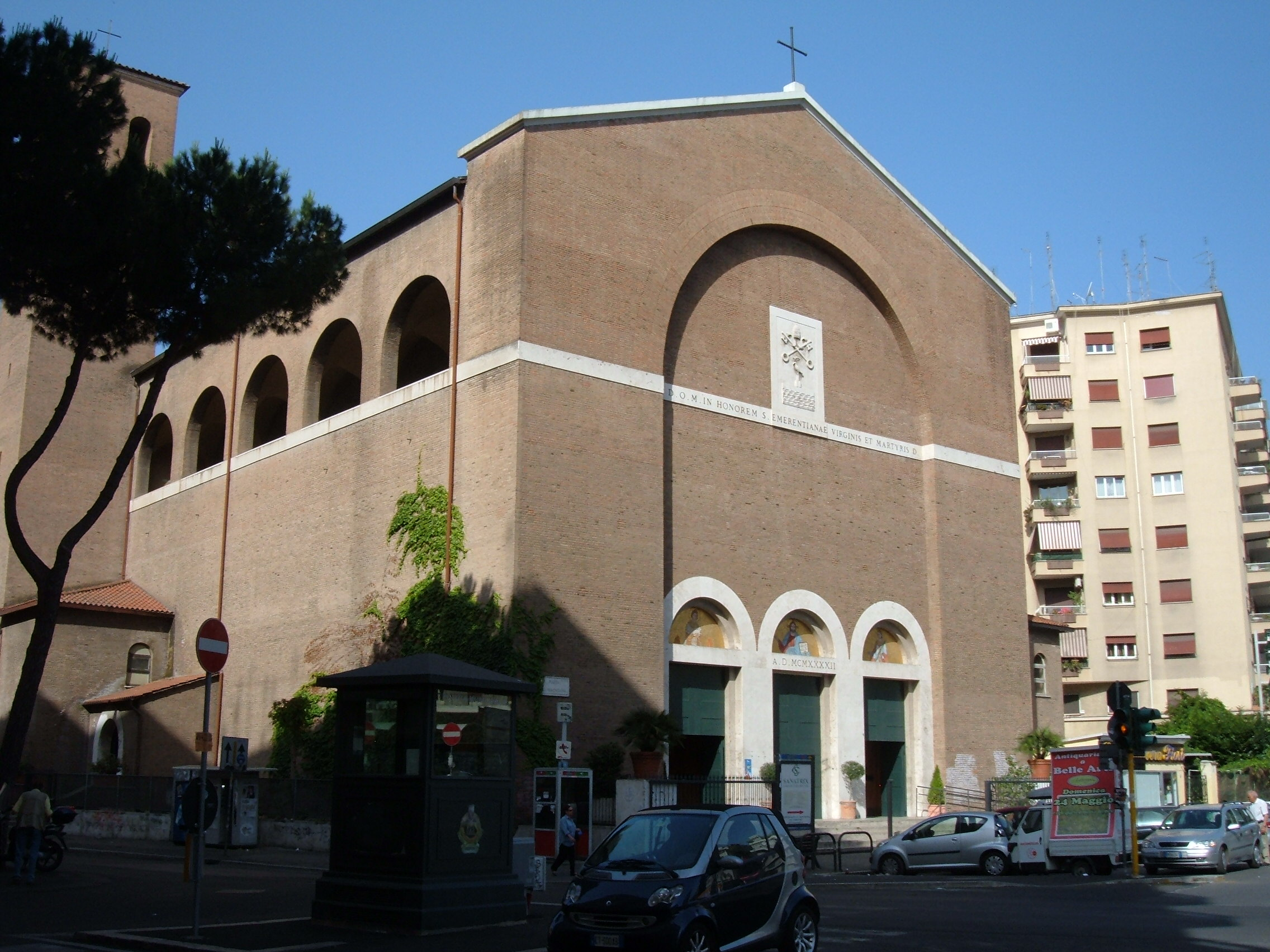
- Facade of Santa Emerenziana a Tor Fiorenza.
- Click on the map for a fullscreen view
- 41°55′43.90″N 12°30′56.85″E
- Location: Via Lucrino 53, Rome
- Country: Italy
- Denomination: Roman Catholic
- Tradition: Roman Rite
- Website: Official website

History
- Status: Titular church
- Dedication: Emerentiana
- Consecrated: 1942

Architecture
- Architect: Tullio Rossi
- Architectural type: Church
- Groundbreaking: 1940
- Completed: 1942

The Church of Saint Emerentiana on Tor Fiorenza (Italian: Santa Emerenziana a Tor Fiorenza, Latin: S. Emerentianae ad locum vulgo Tor Fiorenza) is a Roman Catholic titular church in Rome, built as a parish church, by decree of Cardinal Francesco Marchetti Selvaggiani. It is named for Saint Emerentiana, a 4th-century martyr. On 5 March 1973 Pope Paul VI granted it a titular church as a seat for Cardinals.

At present the Titulus Sancta Emerentianae ad locum vulgo Tor Fiorenza is held by Jean-Pierre Kutwa.

== Architecture ==
The facade has three doors which are framed by travertine marble. The church has three naves separated by pillars, with six side chapels. The apse is dominated by a large mosaic depicting the Triumph of the Church, by the Franciscan Belluno Ugolino.

== List of Cardinal Priests ==
- José Salazar López (5 March 1973 – 9 July 1991)
- Peter Seiichi Shirayanagi (26 November 1994 – 30 December 2009)
- Medardo Joseph Mazombwe (20 November 2010 – 29 August 2013)
- Jean-Pierre Kutwa (22 February 2014 - incumbent)
