= Basilica of Our Lady of Peace =

Basilica of Our Lady of Peace (EFO)
- Yamoussoukro Basilica
- French: Basilique Notre-Dame de la Paix
- The basilica in 2007

- Location within Ivory Coast
- 6°48′40″N 5°17′49″W
- Location: Rue de St. France, Yamoussoukro
- Country: Ivory Coast
- Denomination: Catholic Church
- Sui iuris church: Latin Church

History
- Status: Minor basilica
- Dedication: Our Lady of Peace
- Consecrated: September 10, 1990; 36 years ago

Architecture
- Architect: Pierre Fakhoury
- Architectural type: Basilica
- Style: Renaissance Revival and Baroque Revival
- Groundbreaking: August 10, 1985; 41 years ago
- Completed: 1990; 36 years ago
- Construction cost: US$175–600 million

Specifications
- Capacity: 18,000
- Length: 195 metres (640 ft)
- Width: 150 metres (490 ft)
- Height: 158 metres (518 ft)
- Materials: marble

Administration
- Province: Bouaké
- Diocese: Yamoussoukro

The Basilica of Our Lady of Peace (French: Basilique Notre-Dame de la Paix, pronounced [bazilik nɔtʁə dam də la pɛ]) is a Catholic minor basilica dedicated to Our Lady of Peace in Yamoussoukro, the administrative capital of Ivory Coast. Guinness World Records lists it as the largest church in the world, having surpassed the previous record holder, Saint Peter's Basilica, upon completion. It has an area of 30,000 square metres (320,000 sq ft) and is 158 metres (518 ft) tall. However, it also includes a rectory and a villa (counted in the overall area), which are not strictly part of the church. It can accommodate 18,000 worshippers, compared to 60,000 for St. Peter's.

The basilica was constructed between 1985 and 1989 with different cost estimates given by various groups. Some stated that it cost US$175 million, US$300 million, or as high as US$600 million. The designs of the dome and encircled plaza were inspired by the Basilica of Saint Peter in Vatican City, although it is not an outright replica. The cornerstone was laid on 10 August 1985, and it was consecrated on 10 September 1990 by Pope John Paul II, who had just formally accepted the basilica as a gift from Félix Houphouët-Boigny on behalf of the Catholic Church. The basilica is administered by Polish Pallottines at a cost of US$1.5 million annually.

The basilica is not to be confused with a cathedral. Our Lady of Peace is located in the Diocese of Yamoussoukro; the Cathedral of Saint Augustine—less than 3 km (2 mi) away—is smaller in size than the basilica but the principal place of worship and seat of the bishop of the diocese.

== Architecture ==
While designing it after the Vatican basilica, the Lebanese architect Pierre Fakhoury constructed the dome to be slightly lower than the Basilica of Saint Peter, but topped with a larger cross. The finished height is 158 metres (518 ft). The dome is more than twice the diameter of St. Peter's in Rome, 90 metres (300 ft) versus 41 metres (135 ft). The base of the dome is much lower than Saint Peter's, so the overall height is slightly less. The basilica is constructed with marble imported from Italy and is furnished with 8,400 square metres (90,000 sq ft) of contemporary stained glass from France. France Vitrail International near Paris handmade the stained glass for the Basilica which was the largest such order ever placed and comprised 8,400 square metres (90,000 sq ft) of material assembled in 18,500 panels.

The choir

Columns are plentiful throughout the basilica but are not uniform in style; the smaller columns are structural, while the larger ones are decorative and contain elevators, rainwater conduits from the roof and other building mechanical devices. The nave contains enough space to seat 7,000 people, with standing room for an additional 11,000 people. Apart from the basilica are two identical villas. One of the villas accommodates the clergy who operate the basilica. A room in the other villa is reserved for papal visits, of which only one has occurred, when the basilica was consecrated.

The wood chosen for the pews in the Basilica was iroko wood.

== Construction ==
The basilica was built by the French company Dumez.

The cost of the basilica was met with some controversy globally when construction began, especially as Ivory Coast was going through an economic and fiscal crisis at the time. Pope John Paul II agreed to consecrate the basilica on the condition that a hospital also be built nearby. This hospital, whose construction was frozen during the First Ivorian Civil War, was finally completed in 2014 and opened in January 2015, at a cost of €21.3 million.

== Memorial ==
Ivory Coast President Félix Houphouët-Boigny chose his birthplace of Yamoussoukro to be the site of the new capital city of his country in 1983. As part of the plan of the city, the president wanted to memorialize himself with the construction of the basilica. Houphouët-Boigny is even pictured kneeling beside Jesus at his triumphal entry into Jerusalem in one stained glass panel. Due to the location of the Basilica, it was dubbed by the media as "basilica in the bush". Houphouët-Boigny believed it would become a pilgrimage site for African Catholics.

== See also ==
- List of largest church buildings
- List of tallest church buildings
- List of tallest domes
