= Diocese of Yamoussoukro =

Roman Catholic diocese in Côte d'Ivoire

Coordinates: 6°49′N 5°17′W

Diocese of Yamoussoukro Dioecesis Yamussukroensis Diocèse de Yamoussoukro
- The Cathédrale Saint-Augustin in Yamoussoukro

Location
- Country: Côte d'Ivoire
- Metropolitan: Archdiocese of Bouaké
- Headquarters: Yamoussoukro, Côte d'Ivoire

Statistics
- Area: 19,890 km^{2} (7,680 sq mi)
- Population: Total; Catholics: (as of 2023); 1,457,000; 154,500 (10.6%)
- Parishes: 27

Information
- Denomination: Catholic Church
- Sui iuris church: Latin Church
- Rite: Roman Rite
- Established: 6 March 1992; 34 years ago
- Cathedral: Cathédrale Saint-Augustin in Yamoussoukro
- Secular priests: 89 (64 Diocesan, 25 Religious Orders)

Current leadership
- Pope: Leo XIV
- Bishop: Joseph Kakou Aka
- Metropolitan Archbishop: Jacques Assanvo Ahiwa

The Roman Catholic Diocese of Yamoussoukro (Latin: Yamussukroën(sis)) is a diocese located in the city of Yamoussoukro in the ecclesiastical province of Bouaké in Côte d'Ivoire.

== History ==
- 6 March 1992: Established as Diocese of Yamoussoukro from the Diocese of Bouaké

== Special churches ==
The Cathedral is the Cathédrale Saint-Augustin in Yamoussoukro. The Minor Basilica Basilique Notre-Dame de la Paix in Yamoussoukro is the largest church in the world according to the Guinness World Records having surpassed St Peter's Basilica in the Vatican

== Leadership ==
Bishops of Yamoussoukro (Roman rite)

- Bernard Agré (6 March 1992 – 19 December 1994), appointed Archbishop of Abidjan
- Paul-Siméon Ahouanan Djro, O.F.M. (6 December 1995 – 12 January 2006), appointed Coadjutor Archbishop of Bouaké
- Joseph Aké Yapo (21 July 2006 – 22 November 2008), appointed Archbishop of Gagnoa
- Marcellin Yao Kouadio (1 July 2006 – 25 April 2018), appointed Bishop of Daloa
  - Apostolic Administrator Alexis Youlo Touabli (19 June 2018 – 19 February 2023), Bishop of Agboville
- Joseph Kakou Aka (28 December 2022 – Present)

== See also ==
- Roman Catholicism in Côte d'Ivoire
- List of Roman Catholic dioceses in Côte d'Ivoire

== Sources ==
- GCatholic.org
- Catholic Hierarchy
