= Archdiocese of Bouaké =

Roman Catholic archdiocese in Ivory Coast

Coordinates: 7°41′N 5°1′W

Archdiocese of Bouaké Archidioecesis Buakensis Archidiocèse de Bouaké
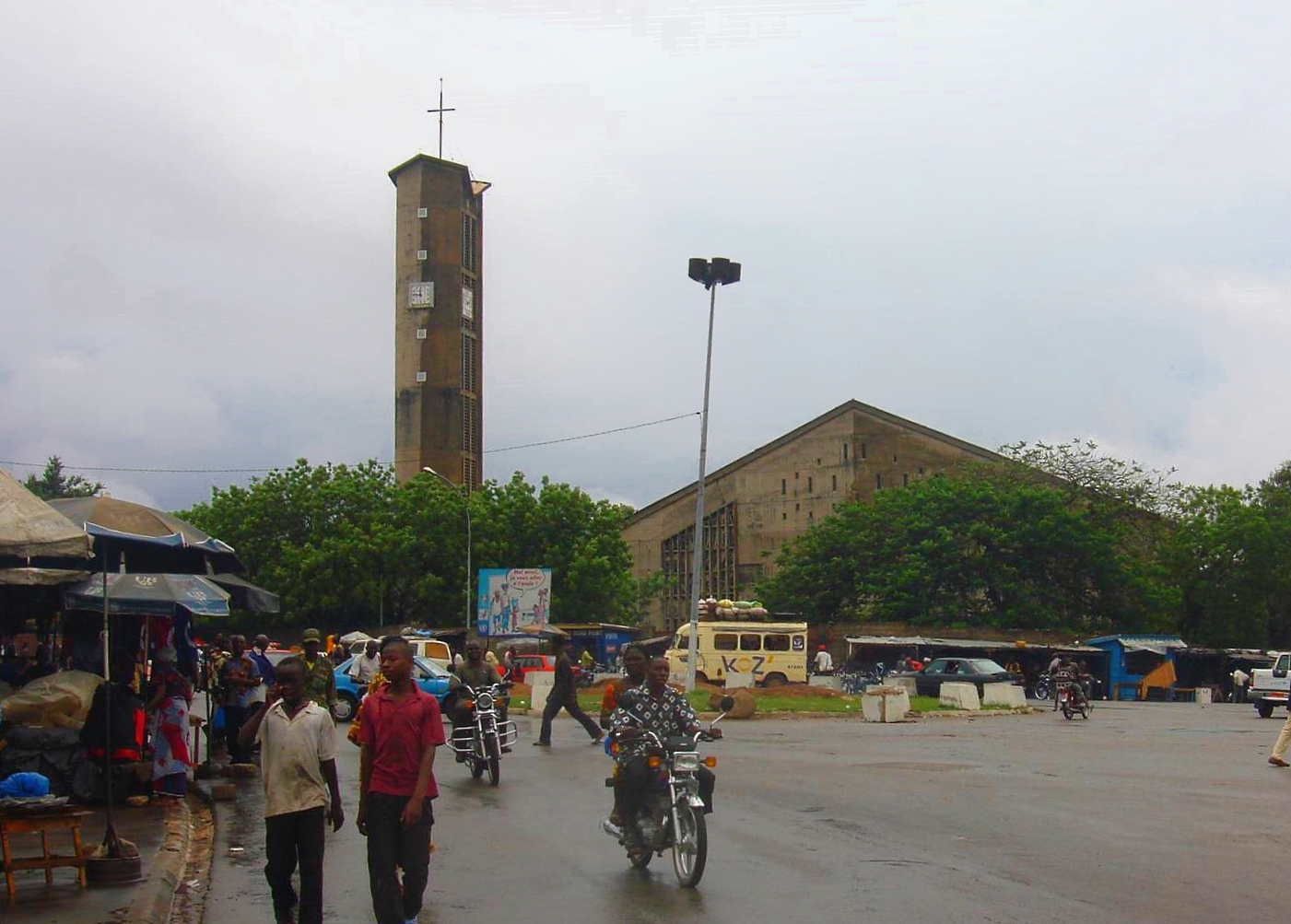
- Cathédrale Sainte-Thérèse-de-l'Enfant-Jésus de Bouaké in 2008

Location
- Country: Côte d'Ivoire
- Headquarters: Bouaké, Vallée du Bandama District, Côte d'Ivoire

Statistics
- Area: 20,000 km^{2} (7,700 sq mi)
- Population: Total; Catholics: (as of 2023); 1,364,929; 267,130 (19.6%)
- Parishes: 39

Information
- Denomination: Catholic Church
- Sui iuris church: Latin Church
- Rite: Roman Rite
- Established: 17 May 1951; 75 years ago
- Cathedral: Cathédrale Sainte-Thérèse-de-l'Enfant-Jésus de Bouaké
- Secular priests: 88 (65 Diocesan, 23 Religious Orders)

Current leadership
- Pope: Leo XIV
- Metropolitan Archbishop: Jacques Assanvo Ahiwa

The Roman Catholic Archdiocese of Bouaké (Latin: Buaken(sis)) is the Metropolitan See for the ecclesiastical province of Bouaké in Côte d'Ivoire.

== History ==
- 17 May 1951: Established as Apostolic Prefecture of Bouaké from the Apostolic Vicariate of Abidjan
- 14 September 1955: Promoted as Diocese of Bouaké
- 19 December 1994: Promoted as Metropolitan Archdiocese of Bouaké

== Special churches ==
The seat of the archbishop is Cathédrale Sainte Thérèse in Bouaké.

== Leadership ==
Prefect of Bouaké (Roman rite)

- André-Pierre Duirat, S.M.A. (26 October 1951 – 14 September 1955 see below)

Bishops of Bouaké (Roman rite)

- André-Pierre Duirat, S.M.A. (see above 14 September 1955 – 17 May 1973), resigned
- Vital Komenan Yao (17 May 1973 – 19 December 1994 see below)

Metropolitan Archbishops of Bouaké (Roman rite)

- Vital Komenan Yao (see above 19 December 1994 – 22 September 2006)
- Paul-Siméon Ahouanan Djro, O.F.M. (22 September 2006 – 12 February 2024)
  - Apostolic Administrator Jacques Assanvo Ahiwa (13 February 2024 – 25 July 2024), Auxiliary Bishop of Bouaké
- Jacques Assanvo Ahiwa (25 July 2024 – Present)

=== Coadjutor Archbishop ===
- Paul-Siméon Ahouanan Djro, O.F.M. (2006)

=== Auxiliary Bishop ===
- Jacques Assanvo Ahiwa (2020-2024)

=== Other priest of this diocese who became bishop ===
- Auguste Nobou (1959-1971), appointed Bishop of Korhogo in 1971

== Suffragan Dioceses ==
- Abengourou
- Bondoukou
- Yamoussoukro

== See also ==
- Roman Catholicism in Côte d'Ivoire
- List of Roman Catholic dioceses in Côte d'Ivoire

== Sources ==
- GCatholic.org
