= Diocese of Grand-Bassam =

Roman Catholic diocese in Côte d'Ivoire

Coordinates: 5°12′N 3°44′W

Diocese of Grand-Bassam Dioecesis Bassam Maioris

Location
- Country: Côte d'Ivoire
- Metropolitan: Abidjan

Statistics
- Area: 8,354 km^{2} (3,225 sq mi)
- Population: Total; Catholics: (as of 2004); 962,886; 230,841 (24.0%)

Information
- Rite: Latin Rite

Current leadership
- Pope: Leo XIV
- Bishop: Raymond Ahoua, F.D.P.
- Bishops emeritus: Paul Dacoury-Tabley

The Roman Catholic Diocese of Grand-Bassam (Latin: Bassam Maioris) is a diocese located in the city of Grand-Bassam in the ecclesiastical province of Abidjan in Côte d'Ivoire.

== History ==
- June 8, 1982: Established as Diocese of Grand-Bassam from the Metropolitan Archdiocese of Abidjan

== Special churches ==
The Cathedral is the Cathédrale Sacré Cœur in Grand-Bassam.

== Bishops ==
- Bishops of Grand-Bassam (Roman rite)
  - Bishop Joseph Akichi (1982.06.08 – 1993.04.05)
  - Bishop Paul Dacoury-Tabley (1994.12.19 - 2010.03.27)
  - Bishop Raymond Ahoua, F.D.P. (since 2010.03.27)

=== Other priest of this diocese who became bishop ===
- Jacques Assanvo Ahiwa, appointed auxiliary bishop of Bouaké in 2020

== See also ==
- Roman Catholicism in Côte d'Ivoire
- List of Roman Catholic dioceses in Côte d'Ivoire

== Sources ==
- GCatholic.org
- Catholic Hierarchy
