= Ignatius C. Wang =

Chinese American Catholic prelate (born 1934)

His Excellency, The Most Reverend Ignatius Chung Wang 汪中璋
- Auxiliary Bishop Emeritus of San Francisco
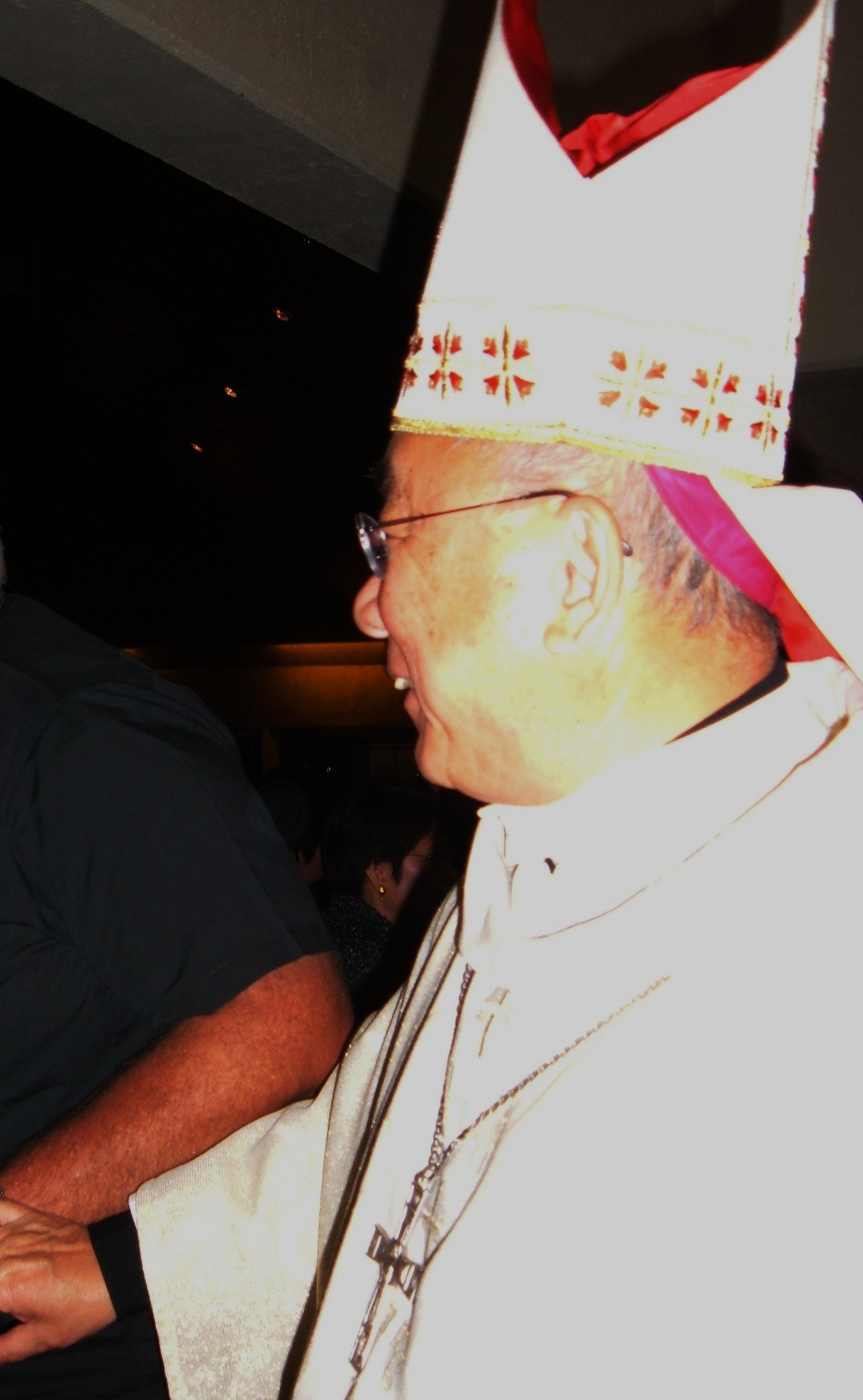
- Wang in February 2008
- Archdiocese: San Francisco
- Appointed: December 13, 2002
- Installed: January 30, 2003
- Retired: May 16, 2009
- Other post: Titular Bishop of Sitipa (2003–)

Orders
- Ordination: July 4, 1959
- Consecration: January 30, 2003 by William Levada, Patrick Joseph McGrath, and John Charles Wester

Personal details
- Born: February 27, 1934 (age 92) Peking, Republic of China
- Motto: Quid retribuam Domino (Latin for 'What shall I repay the Lord?')
- Styles
- Reference style: His Excellency; The Most Reverend
- Spoken style: Your Excellency
- Religious style: Bishop

Ignatius Chung Wang (born February 27, 1934) is a Chinese American Catholic prelate who served as an auxiliary bishop of the Archdiocese of San Francisco in California from 2002 to 2009. Wang is the first Asian-American and Chinese-American to be appointed as a Catholic bishop.

== Biography ==
=== Early life ===
Chung Wang was born in Beijing in what was then the Republic of China on February 27, 1934. He attended Catholic schools in the former British Colony of Hong Kong, then started his studies for the priesthood at the Regional Seminary for South China in Hong Kong.

=== Priesthood ===
On July 4, 1959, Wang was ordained into the priesthood for the Apostolic Prefecture of Jian'ou (Kienow) at the Church of St. Francis of Assisi in Hong Kong. However, the People's Republic of China refused to allow Wang to serve as a priest in Kienow.

In 1962, Wang began studies in Rome, receiving a Doctor of Canon Law degree. His first assignment was as a parish priest and vicar general of the Diocese of Saint George's in Grenada.

In 1974, the Vatican allowed Wang to transfer to San Francisco, the home of his sister and her children. When she died of cancer, Wang became the children's guardian. Wang's first assignment in the archdiocese was as parochial vicar for some of the parishes.

In 1981, Wang was appointed as director of the Office of Chinese Catholic Ministry. He initiated a ritual blessing of ancestors at the Chinese New Year's Mass. In 1982, he was posted as pastor of St. Francis of Assisi Parish in San Francisco, becoming the first Chinese-American Catholic pastor in San Francisco. He also became a member of the archdiocesan Tribunal and coordinator of the Chinese Apostolate.

In 1989, Pope John Paul II named Wang as a Prelate of Honor with the title of Monsignor.

=== Auxiliary Bishop of San Francisco ===
On December 13, 2002, John Paul II appointed Wang as an auxiliary bishop of the Archdiocese of San Francisco and titular bishop of Sitipa. He was consecrated by Cardinal Levada on January 30, 2003.

On May 16, 2009, Pope Benedict XVI received Wang's letter of resignation as auxiliary bishop of San Francisco, having reached the mandatory retirement age of 75 for bishops.

== See also ==
- Catholic Church hierarchy
- Catholic Church in the United States
- Historical list of the Catholic bishops of the United States
- List of Catholic bishops of the United States
- Lists of patriarchs, archbishops, and bishops

== Episcopal succession ==
Catholic Church titles
Preceded by -	Auxiliary Bishop of San Francisco; 2003-2009	Succeeded by -
