= Binao, Ivory Coast =

Binao Bianu
- Village
- Location in Ivory Coast
- Coordinates: 5°48′N 4°40′W
- Country: Ivory Coast
- District: Lagunes
- Region: Agnéby-Tiassa
- Department: Tiassalé
- Sub-prefecture: Gbolouville
- Time zone: UTC+0 (GMT)

Binao (also known as Bianu) is a village in southern Ivory Coast. It is in the sub-prefecture of Gbolouville, Tiassalé Department, Agnéby-Tiassa Region, Lagunes District.

Until 2012, Binao was in the commune of Binao-Boussoué. In March 2012, Binao-Boussoué became one of 1,126 communes nationwide that were abolished.
