= Bruno Kouamé =

Ivorian Roman Catholic bishop (1927–2021)

Bruno Kouamé (16 December 1927 – 17 May 2021) was an Ivorian Roman Catholic bishop.

Koaumé was born in the Ivory Coast and was ordained to the priesthood in 1956. He served as bishop of the Roman Catholic Diocese of Abengourou, Ivory Coast, from 1981 to 2003.
