= Archdiocese of Gagnoa =

Roman Catholic archdiocese in Ivory Coast

Coordinates: 6.1333°N 5.9333°W

Archdiocese of Gagnoa Archidioecesis Gagnoaensis Archidiocèse de Gagnoa

Location
- Country: Côte d'Ivoire
- Headquarters: Gagnoa, Gôh-Djiboua District, Côte d'Ivoire

Statistics
- Area: 19,949 km^{2} (7,702 sq mi)
- Population: Total; Catholics: (as of 2023); 2,589,000; 515,800 (19.9%)
- Parishes: 43

Information
- Denomination: Catholic Church
- Sui iuris church: Latin Church
- Rite: Roman Rite
- Established: 25 June 1956; 70 years ago
- Cathedral: St. Ann Cathedral, Gagnoa
- Secular priests: 111 (107 Diocesan, 4 Religious Orders)

Current leadership
- Pope: Leo XIV
- Metropolitan Archbishop: Jean-Jacques Koffi Oi Koffi
- Bishops emeritus: Joseph Aké Yapo

The Roman Catholic Archdiocese of Gagnoa (Latin: Gagnoaën(sis)) is the Metropolitan See for the ecclesiastical province of Gagnoa in Côte d'Ivoire.

== History ==
- 25 June 1956: Established as Diocese of Gagnoa from the Diocese of Daloa
- 19 December 1994: Promoted as Metropolitan Archdiocese of Gagnoa

== Special churches ==
The seat of the archbishop is Cathédrale Sainte-Anne in Gagnoa.

== Leadership ==
=== Ordinaries ===
Bishops of Gagnoa (Roman rite)

- Jean-Marie Étrillard, S.M.A. (4 July 1956 – 11 March 1971), resigned
- Noël Kokora-Tekry (11 March 1971 – 19 December 1994 see below)

Metropolitan Archbishops of Gagnoa (Roman rite)

- Noël Kokora-Tekry (see above 19 December 1994 – 15 May 2001), retired
- Jean-Pierre Kutwa (15 May 2001 – 2 May 2006), appointed Archbishop of Abidjan
- Barthélémy Djabla (21 July 2006 – 15 September 2008)
- Joseph Aké Yapo (22 November 2008 – 4 October 2023), resigned
  - Apostolic Administrator Jean-Jacques Koffi Oi Koffi (4 October 2023 – 8 April 2025), Bishop of San-Pédro
- Jean-Jacques Koffi Oi Koffi (8 April 2025 – Present)

=== Other priests of this diocese who became bishops ===
- Alexis Youlo Touabli (1987-1992), appointed Bishop of Agboville in 2006
- Gaspard Béby Gnéba (1992-2007), appointed Bishop of Man in 2007
- Honoré Beugré Dakpa (1998-2023), appointed Bishop of Katiola in 2023

== Suffragan Dioceses ==
- Daloa
- Man
- San Pedro-en-Côte d'Ivoire

== See also ==
- Roman Catholicism in Côte d'Ivoire
- List of Roman Catholic dioceses in Côte d'Ivoire

== Sources ==
- GCatholic.org
