= Diocese of Daloa =

Roman Catholic diocese in Côte d'Ivoire

Coordinates: 6°53′N 6°27′W

Diocese of Daloa Dioecesis Daloaensis

Location
- Country: Côte d'Ivoire
- Metropolitan: Gagnoa

Statistics
- Area: 22,637 km^{2} (8,740 sq mi)
- Population: Total; Catholics: (as of 2019); 1790000; 38,000 (3.2%)

Information
- Rite: Latin Rite

Current leadership
- Pope: Leo XIV
- Bishop: Marcellin Yao Kouadio
- Bishops emeritus: Maurice Konan Kouassi

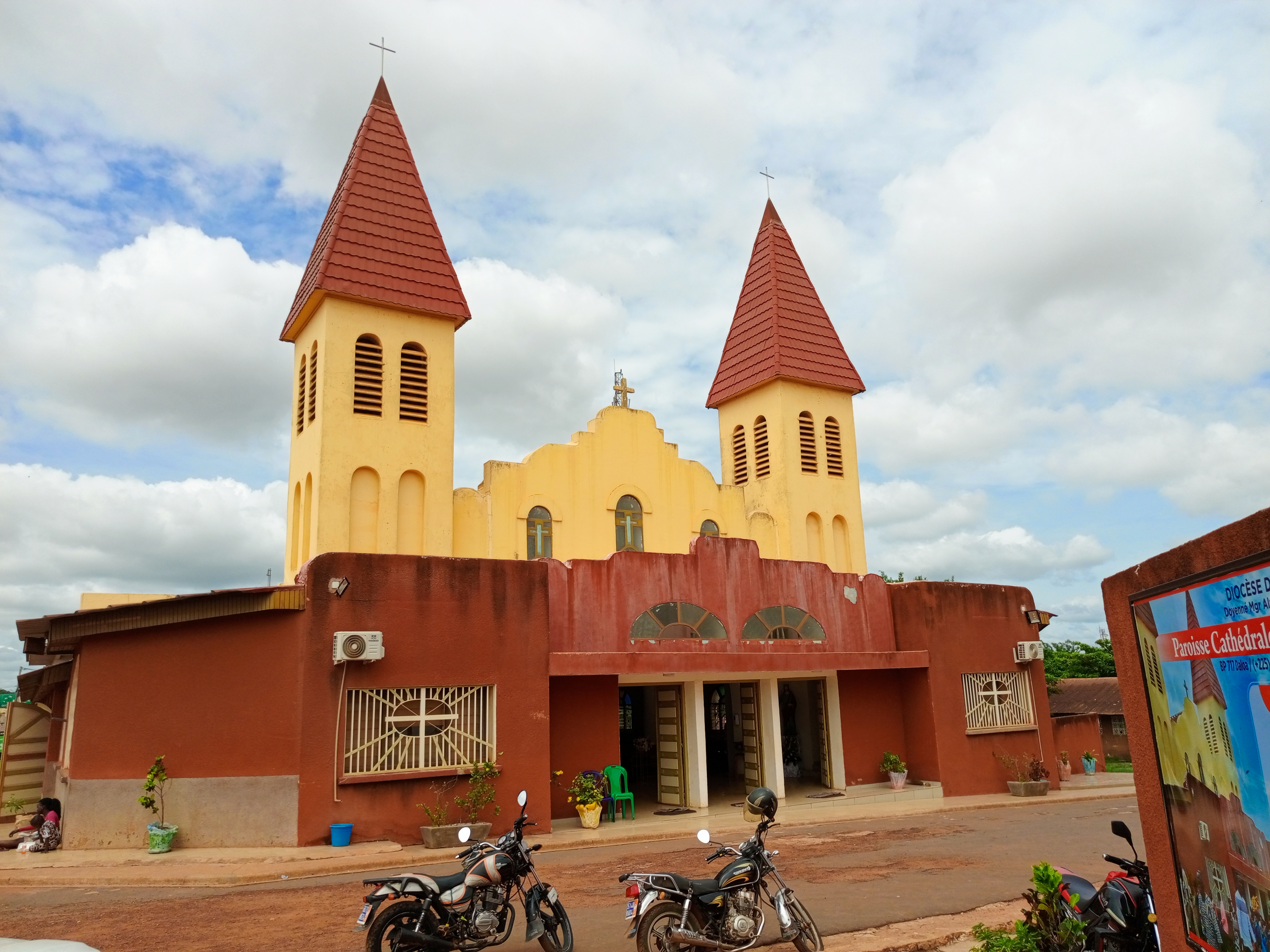
Christ the King Cathedral of Daloa, 2023

The Roman Catholic Diocese of Daloa (Latin: Dalaoaën(sis)) is a diocese located in the city of Daloa in the ecclesiastical province of Gagnoa in Côte d'Ivoire.

== History ==
- April 9, 1940: Established as Apostolic Vicariate of Sassandra from the Apostolic Vicariate of Costa d’Avorio
- September 14, 1955: Promoted as Diocese of Daloa

== Special churches ==
The cathedral of the diocese is the Cathédrale du Christ-Roi in Daloa.

== Leadership, in reverse chronological order ==
- Bishops of Daloa (Roman rite), below
  - Bishop Marcellin Yao Kouadio (since 2018.04.25)
  - Bishop Maurice Konan Kouassi (2005.03.22 - 2018.04.25)
  - Bishop Pierre-Marie Coty (1975.11.20 – 2005.03.22)
  - Bishop Pierre-Eugène Rouanet, S.M.A. (1956.07.04 - 1975.11.20)
  - Bishop Jean Marie Etrillard, S.M.A. (1956.02.29 – 1956.07.04), appointed Bishop of Gagnoa
- Vicar Apostolic of Sassandra (Roman rite), below
  - Bishop Alphonse Charles Kirmann, S.M.A. (1940.04.09 – 1955.03.25)

== See also ==
- Roman Catholicism in Côte d'Ivoire
- List of Roman Catholic dioceses in Côte d'Ivoire

== Link ==
- GCatholic.org
- Catholic Hierarchy
