= Jean-Marie Kélétigui =

Ivorian bishop (1932–2010)

- Bishop of Katiola
- Church: Catholic Church
- Diocese: Diocese of Katiola
- In office: 7 July 1977 – 10 October 2002
- Predecessor: Émile Durrheimer
- Successor: Marie-Daniel Dadiet

Orders
- Ordination: 2 July 1960
- Consecration: 30 October 1977 by Émile Durrheimer

Personal details
- Born: 12 May 1932 Gnénankaha, Colony of Ivory Coast, French West Africa, French Empire
- Died: 31 August 2010 (aged 78)

Jean-Marie Kélétigui (12 May 1932, Gnénankaha, French West Africa – 31 August 2010) was the Ivorian bishop of the Roman Catholic Diocese of Katiola from 7 July 1977, until his retirement on 10 October 2002. He was named Bishop Emeritus of Katiola until his death in 2010, aged 78.
