= Ignace Bessi Dogbo =

Ivorian Roman Catholic prelate

His Eminence Ignace Bessi Dogbo
- Cardinal; Archbishop of Abidjan
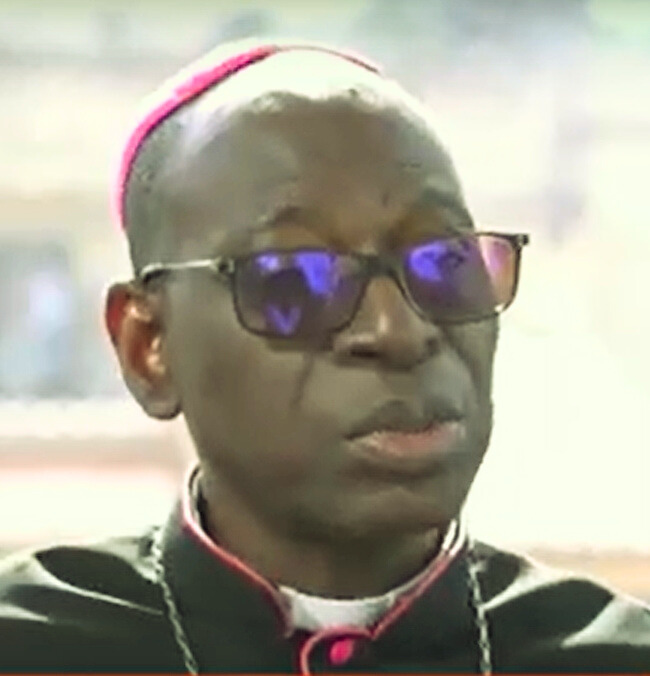
- Archdiocese: Abidjan
- Appointed: 20 May 2024
- Installed: 3 August 2024
- Predecessor: Jean-Pierre Kutwa
- Other post: Cardinal-Priest of Santi Mario e Compagni Martiri (2024–)
- Previous posts: Bishop of Katiola (2004–2021); Apostolic Administrator of Kohogo (2017–); President of the Conference of Catholic Bishops of Ivory Coast (2017–2023); Archbishop of Korhogo (2021–2024)

Orders
- Ordination: 2 August 1987 by Laurent Akran Mandjo
- Consecration: 12 May 2004 by Pope John Paul II
- Created cardinal: 7 December 2024 by Pope Francis
- Rank: Cardinal-Priest

Personal details
- Born: 17 August 1961 (age 64) Niangon-Adjamé, Abidjan, Ivory Coast
- Coat of arms

Ignace Bessi Dogbo (born 17 August 1961) is an Ivorian prelate of the Catholic Church who has been the Archbishop of Abidjan since 2024. He was previously Bishop of Katiola from 2004 to 2021 and Archbishop of Korhogo from 2021 to 2024, having served there as apostolic administrator since 2017. He was made a cardinal on 7 December 2024 by Pope Francis.

== Biography ==
Ignace Bessi Dogbo was born on 17 August 1961 in Niangon-Adjamé, a village in the District of Abidjan. He was ordained a priest on 2 August 1987 by Laurent Akran Mandjo Bishop of the diocese of Yopougon and fulfilled parish assignments in that diocese for two years. Beginning in 1989, he studied for four years at the Pontifical Biblical Institute in Rome and earned a degree in exegesis. Returning to Yopougon, he was diocesan director of the Pontifical Mission Societies from 1993 to 1995 and vicar general of the diocese from 1995 to 1997. In 1997, he was appointed parish priest of the Saint-André Cathedral in Yopougon. From 1993 to 1997 he was also professor of biblical languages at Saint Paul major seminary in Abadjin Kouté (Songon) and diocesan spiritual assistant to the Young Christian Students.

On 12 May 2004, Pope John Paul II named him bishop of Katiola. He received his episcopal consecration on 4 July from Bishop Mandjo and was installed there on 10 July.

In October 2015, as an elected representative of the Ivorian bishops, he participated in the Synod of Bishops, at the Vatican.

In 2017, he became Apostolic Administrator of Korhogo. On 3 January 2021, Pope Francis appointed him Archbishop of Korhogo.

From 2017 to June 2023, he was president of the Conference of Catholic Bishops of the Ivory Coast.

On 20 May 2024, Francis named Bessi Dogbo Archbishop of Abidjan. He was installed on 3 August in the Cathedral of Saint Paul in Abidjan.

On 6 October 2024, Pope Francis announced that he planned to make Bessi Dogbo a cardinal on 8 December, a date that was later changed to 7 December.

On 7 December 2024, Pope Francis made him a cardinal, assigning him as a member of the order of cardinal priests the title of Santi Mario e Compagni Martiri.

He participated as a cardinal elector in the 2025 papal conclave that elected Pope Leo XIV.

== See also ==
- Catholic Church in Ivory Coast
- Cardinals created by Pope Francis
