= Diocese of Man =

Roman Catholic diocese in Côte d'Ivoire

Coordinates: 7°24′N 7°33′W

Diocese of Man Dioecesis Manensis

Location
- Country: Côte d'Ivoire
- Metropolitan: Gagnoa

Statistics
- Area: 30,750 km^{2} (11,870 sq mi)
- Population: Total; Catholics: (as of 2004); 1,445,243; 72,567 (5.0%)

Information
- Rite: Latin Rite

Current leadership
- Pope: Leo XIV
- Bishop: vacant
- Bishops emeritus: Joseph Niangoran Teky

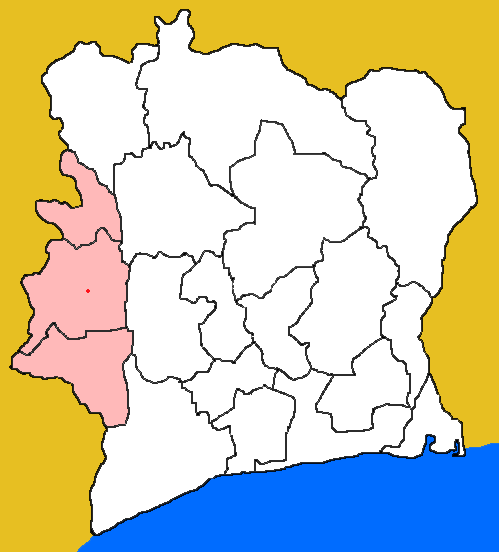

The Roman Catholic Diocese of Man (Latin: Manen(sis)) is a diocese located in the city of Man in the ecclesiastical province of Gagnoa in Côte d'Ivoire.

== History ==
- June 8, 1968: Established as Diocese of Man from the Diocese of Daloa

== Special churches ==
The Cathedral is the Cathédrale Saint-Michel in Man.

== Leadership ==
Bishops of Man

- Bishop Bernard Agré (1968.06.08 – 1992.03.06), appointed Bishop of Yamoussoukro; later Cardinal
- Bishop Joseph Niangoran Teky (1992.12.17 – 2007.12.18)
- Bishop Gaspard Béby Gnéba (2007.12.18 – 2026.02.19), named auxiliary of Abidjan

== See also ==
- Roman Catholicism in Côte d'Ivoire
- List of Roman Catholic dioceses in Côte d'Ivoire

== Sources ==
- GCatholic.org
- Catholic Hierarchy
- Diocèse de Man (Site officiel)
