= Diocese of San-Pédro =

Roman Catholic diocese in Ivory Coast

Coordinates: 4°45′N 6°38′W

Roman Catholic Diocese of San-Pédro Dioecesis Sancti Petri in Litore Eburneo

Location
- Country: Ivory Coast
- Metropolitan: Gagnoa

Statistics
- Area: 30,375 km^{2} (11,728 sq mi)
- Population: Total; Catholics: (as of 2004); 1,100,000; 60,000 (5.5%)

Information
- Rite: Latin Rite

Current leadership
- Pope: Leo XIV
- Bishop: Alexis Youlo Touabli
- Bishops emeritus: Jean-Jacques Koffi Oi Koffi

The Roman Catholic Diocese of San-Pédro (Latin: Sancti Petri in Litore Eburneo) is a diocese located in the city of San-Pédro in the ecclesiastical province of Gagnoa in Ivory Coast.

== History ==
- October 23, 1989: Established as Diocese of San-Pédro Diocese of Gagnoa

== Special churches ==
The Cathedral is the Cathédrale St. Pierre in San-Pédro.

== Leadership ==
Bishops of San-Pédro (Roman rite)

- Barthélémy Djabla (23 October 1989 – 21 July 2006), appointed Archbishop of Gagnoa
- Paulin Kouabénan N'Gnamé (1 March 2007 – 21 March 2008)
- Jean-Jacques Koffi Oi Koffi (3 January 2009 - 8 April 2025)
- Alexis Youlo Touabli (since 22 October 2025)

== See also ==
- Catholic Church in Ivory Coast
- List of Catholic dioceses in Ivory Coast

== Sources ==
- GCatholic.org
- Catholic Hierarchy
