= Sitipa =

Africa Proconsularis (125 AD).

Sitipa also known as Sitipensis is a titular see of the Roman Catholic Church centered in North Africa.

Very little is known of the history of the bishopric. A Catholic Bishop Argyrius was present at the Council of Carthage (411) but the actual location of the seat of the diocese (a town called Sitipensis Plebs) is unknown.

The titular bishopric was only added to the list of titular bishops in 1989.

The current bishop is Ignatius Chung Wang of San Francisco.
