= Pierre-Eugène Rouanet =

French Roman Catholic bishop

Pierre-Eugène Rouanet, S.M.A.
- Bishop of Diocese of Daloa (Emeritus)
- Church: Roman Catholic Church
- See: Diocese of Daloa
- In office: 1956 - 1975
- Predecessor: Jean Marie Etrillard
- Successor: Pierre-Marie Coty
- Previous post: Priest

Orders
- Ordination: July 4, 1948

Personal details
- Born: November 16, 1917 Mazamet, France
- Died: February 4, 2012 (aged 94)

Pierre-Eugène Rouanet, S.M.A. (16 November 1917 – 4 February 2012) was a French bishop of the Roman Catholic Church.

Rouanet was born in Mazamet, France and ordained a priest in the society of apostolic life, the Society of African Missions on 4 July 1948. He was appointed bishop of the Diocese of Daloa on 4 July 1956 and ordained bishop on 29 November 1956. He resigned from governance of the see on 20 November 1975.
