= Songon =

Town in Abidjan, Ivory Coast

- Town, sub-prefecture, and commune
- Location in Ivory Coast
- Coordinates: 5°19′N 4°15′W
- Country: Ivory Coast
- District: Abidjan

Population (2014)
  - Total: 56,038
- Time zone: UTC+0 (GMT)

Songon is a town in southeastern Ivory Coast. It is a suburb of Abidjan and is one of four sub-prefectures of Abidjan Autonomous District. Songon is also a commune. The town is located about 20 kilometres west of Abidjan city.

Villages in the sub-prefecture include Kossihouen.
