= Barthélémy Djabla =

- Archbishop of Gagnoa
- Church: Catholic Church
- Archdiocese: Archdiocese of Gagnoa
- In office: 21 July 2006 – 15 September 2008
- Predecessor: Jean-Pierre Kutwa
- Successor: Joseph Aké Yapo
- Previous post: Bishop of San-Pédro (1989-2006)

Orders
- Ordination: 15 March 1964
- Consecration: 7 January 1990 by Bernard Yago

Personal details
- Born: 1936 Mahibouo (in present-day Gôh-Djiboua District), Colony of Ivory Coast, French West Africa, French Empire
- Died: 15 September 2008 (aged 71–72) Abidjan, Abidjan Department, Côte d'Ivoire

Barthélémy Djabla (1936 – 15 September 2008) was the Ivorian Archbishop of the Roman Catholic Archdiocese of Gagnoa, based in Gagnoa, Côte d'Ivoire.

== Biography ==
Djabla was born in Mahibouo, Côte d'Ivoire. He was ordained a Roman Catholic priest on 15 March 1964, and became a bishop of the Roman Catholic Diocese of San Pedro-en-Côte d'Ivoire on 7 January 1990. He was further installed as the Archbishop of the Roman Catholic Archdiocese of Gagnoa on 24 September 2006.

Djabla remained Archbishop of Gagnoa until his death on 15 September 2008 in Abidjan at the age of 72, and was interred in Gagnoa's cathedral. He was succeeded as Archbishop of Gagnoa by Archbishop Joseph Ake Yabo.
