= Bernard Agré =

Ivorian Catholic prelate

His Eminence Bernard Agré
- Cardinal, Archbishop Emeritus of Abidjan
- Archdiocese: Abidjan
- See: Abidjan
- Appointed: 19 December 1994
- Installed: 26 February 1995
- Term ended: 2 May 2006
- Predecessor: Bernard Yago
- Successor: Jean-Pierre Kutwa
- Other post: Cardinal-Priest of San Giovanni Crisostomo a Monte Sacro Alto
- Previous posts: Bishop of Man (1968–1992); Bishop of Yamoussoukro (1992–1994)

Orders
- Ordination: 20 July 1953 by Jean-Baptiste Boivin
- Consecration: 3 October 1968 by Bernard Yago
- Created cardinal: 21 February 2001
- Rank: Cardinal-Priest

Personal details
- Born: 2 March 1926 Monga, Ivory Coast
- Died: 9 June 2014 (aged 88) Paris, France
- Denomination: Roman Catholic
- Motto: être tout à tous
- Coat of arms

Styles of Bernard Agré
- Reference style: His Eminence
- Spoken style: Your Eminence
- Religious style: Cardinal
- Informal style: Cardinal
- See: Abidjan (emeritus)

Bernard Agré (2 March 1926 – 9 June 2014) was an Ivorian Catholic prelate who served as Archbishop of Abidjan from 1994 to 2006. He was made a cardinal in 2001.

== Biography ==
He was born in Monga, Côte d'Ivoire. He was educated at the Seminary of Bingerville where he studied philosophy, then the Major Seminary of Quidah, Dahomey, now Benin (theology) then finally from 1957 to 1960 at the Pontifical Urbaniana University in Rome where he earned a doctorate summa cum laude in theology.

He was ordained to the priesthood on 20 July 1953, Bishop Jean Baptiste Boivin, S.M.A. Fr Agré served as a vicar in Dabou, teacher and director of the school, 1953–1956. Rector of the pre-seminary in Bingerville, 1956–1957. Pastor of Notre Dame in Treichville, 1960–1962. He was created Domestic prelate on 8 December. He also served as vicar general of Abidjan, in charge of private education and of the Seminaries, 1963–1968.

He was appointed bishop of Man on 8 June 1968 by Pope Paul VI. He served as president of the Regional Episcopal Conference of Western Africa, 1985–1991. Transferred to see of Yamoussoukro, 6 March 1992. Promoted to metropolitan see of Abidjan, 19 December 1994. He was created Cardinal-Priest of San Giovanni Crisostomo a Monte Sacro Alto on 21 February 2001 by Pope John Paul II.

As a cardinal under the age of 80 Agré was one of the cardinal electors who participated in the 2005 papal conclave that selected Pope Benedict XVI. His resignation from the pastoral government of the archdiocese was accepted on 2 May 2006, in conformity to canon 401 § 1 of the Code of Canon Law.

He was a member of the Mbatto people. Agré died in Paris on 9 June 2014.
