= Archdiocese of Abidjan =

Roman Catholic archdiocese in Ivory Coast

Coordinates: 5.3328°N 4.0200°W

Archdiocese of Abidjan Archidioecesis Abidianensis Archidiocèse d'Abidjan
- St. Paul's Cathedral in Abidjan

Location
- Country: Côte d'Ivoire
- Headquarters: Abidjan, Côte d'Ivoire

Statistics
- Area: 3,810 km^{2} (1,470 sq mi)
- Population: Total; Catholics: (as of 2023); 3,982,000; 2,622,000 (65.8%)
- Parishes: 72

Information
- Denomination: Catholic Church
- Sui iuris church: Latin Church
- Rite: Roman Rite
- Established: 28 June 1895; 131 years ago
- Cathedral: St. Paul's Cathedral, Abidjan
- Secular priests: 585 (439 Diocesan, 146 Religious Orders)

Current leadership
- Pope: Leo XIV
- Metropolitan Archbishop: Ignace Bessi Dogbo
- Auxiliary Bishops: Gaspard Béby Gnéba; Aguia Jean Martial Arnaud Kouamé
- Bishops emeritus: Jean-Pierre Kutwa

The Roman Catholic Archdiocese of Abidjan (Latin: Abidianen(sis)) is the Metropolitan See for the ecclesiastical province of Abidjan in Côte d'Ivoire.

== History ==
- 28 June 1895: Established as Apostolic Prefecture of Costa d'Avorio from the Apostolic Prefecture of Gold Coast in Ghana
- 17 November 1911: Promoted as Apostolic Vicariate of Costa d'Avorio
- 9 April 1940: Renamed as Apostolic Vicariate of Abidjan
- 14 September 1955: Promoted as Metropolitan Archdiocese of Abidjan

== Special churches ==
The seat of the archbishop is St. Paul's Cathedral in Abidjan.

== Leadership ==
Prefect of Costa d'Avorio

- Jules Moury, S.M.A. (18 January 1910 – 17 November 1911 see below)

Vicars Apostolic of Costa d’Avorio

- Jules Moury, S.M.A. (see above 17 November 1911 – 29 March 1935)
- François Person, S.M.A. (9 December 1935 – 8 July 1938)
- Jean-Baptiste Boivin, S.M.A. (15 March 1939 – 9 April 1940 see below)

Vicar Apostolic of Abidjan

- Jean-Baptiste Boivin, S.M.A. (see above 9 April 1940 – 14 September 1955 see below)

Metropolitan Archbishops of Abidjan

- Jean-Baptiste Boivin, S.M.A. (see above 14 September 1955 – 10 June 1959), resigned
- Bernard Yago (5 April 1960 – 19 December 1994), retired
- Bernard Agré (19 December 1994 – 2 May 2006), retired
- Jean-Pierre Kutwa (2 May 2006 – 20 May 2024), retired
  - Apostolic Administrator Jean-Pierre Kutwa (20 May 2024 – 3 August 2024), Archbishop Emeritus of Abidjan
- Ignace Bessi Dogbo (20 May 2024 – Present)

=== Auxiliary bishops ===
- Laurent Yapi (1970-1979), appointed Bishop of Abengourou
- Paul Dacoury-Tabley (1979-1994), appointed Bishop of Grand-Bassam
- Joseph Aké Yapo (2001-2006), appointed Bishop of Yamoussoukro
- Gaspard Béby Gnéba (2026-Present), former bishop of Man
- Aguia Jean Martial Arnaud Kouamé (2026-Present)

=== Other priest of this diocese who became bishop ===
- Bernard Agré (1953-1968), appointed Bishop of Man in 1968; later returned here as Archbishop; future Cardinal
- Joseph Niangoran Teky (1961-1992), appointed Bishop of Man

== Suffragan dioceses ==
- Agboville
- Grand-Bassam
- Yopougon

== See also ==
- Roman Catholicism in Côte d'Ivoire
- List of Roman Catholic dioceses in Côte d'Ivoire

== Sources ==
- GCatholic.org
