= Bernard Yago =

Ivorian cardinal

His Eminence Bernard Yago
- Archbishop Emeritus of Abidjan
- Church: Roman Catholic Church
- Archdiocese: Abidjan
- See: Abidjan
- Appointed: 5 April 1960
- Term ended: 19 December 1994
- Predecessor: Jean-Baptiste Boivin
- Successor: Bernard Agré
- Other post: Cardinal-Priest of San Crisogono (1983-97)

Orders
- Ordination: 1 May 1947
- Consecration: 8 May 1960 by Pope John XXIII
- Created cardinal: 2 February 1983 by Pope John Paul II
- Rank: Cardinal-Priest

Personal details
- Born: Bernard Yago; July 1916 Pass, Côte d'Ivoire
- Died: 5 October 1997 (aged 81) Abidjan, Cote d'Ivoire
- Education: Institut Catholique de Paris
- Motto: Ut omnes Unum sint
- Coat of arms

Styles of Bernard Yago
- Reference style: His Eminence
- Spoken style: Your Eminence
- Informal style: Cardinal
- See: Abidjan (emeritus)

Bernard Yago (July 1916 – 5 October 1997) was an Ivorian Catholic prelate who served as Archbishop of Abidjan from 1960 to 1994. He was made a cardinal in 1983.

== Biography ==
Bernard Yago was born in Pass, Yopougon, and studied at the seminary in Abidjan before being ordained to the priesthood on 1 May 1947, the second African priest to do so after Rene Kouassi. He then served as a professor at the Minor Seminary of Bingerville and as director of the Pre-Seminary École de Petit Clerics until 1956, whence he began pastoral work in Abidjan until 1957. Yago furthered his studies at the Catholic Institute of Paris from 1957 to 1959. Upon his return to Côte d'Ivoire, he was Counselor of Catholic Action in Abidjan from until 1960.

On 5 April 1960, Yago was appointed Archbishop of Abidjan by Pope John XXIII. He received his episcopal consecration on the following 8 May from Pope John himself, with Bishops Napoléon-Alexandre Labrie, CIM and Fulton John Sheen serving as co-consecrators, in St. Peter's Basilica. Yago attended the Second Vatican Council from 1962 to 1965, and sat on the Council's Central Preparatory Commission.

Pope John Paul II made him Cardinal-Priest of San Crisogono in the consistory of 2 February 1983. Yago, who was the first cardinal from Côte d'Ivoire, resigned his post as Archbishop on 19 December 1994, after 34 years. He lost the right to participate in a papal conclave upon reaching the age of eighty in July 1996.

Cardinal Yago died in Abidjan at age 81. He is buried in the metropolitan cathedral of Abidjan.

== Legacy ==
Yago was one of the only clergy in Côte d'Ivoire who openly opposed the construction of the gargantuan basilica, modeled on St. Peter's Basilica in Vatican City, built by the former president Félix Houphouët-Boigny in his home village of Yamoussoukro because of the enormous waste of hundreds of millions of dollars, and attempted to persuade Pope John Paul II from consecrating it during his visit to the country.

Catholic Church titles
| Preceded by Jean-Baptiste Boivin, SMA | Archbishop of Abidjan; 1960–1994 | Succeeded by Bernard Agré |
