= Catholic Church in Ivory Coast =

- The Cathédrale Saint-Augustin in Yamoussoukro
- Type: National polity
- Classification: Catholic
- Orientation: Latin, Maronite
- Pope: Leo XIV
- Apostolic Nuncio: Mauricio Rueda Beltz
- Region: Ivory Coast
- Members: ca. 2,800,000

Interior of the Basilica of Our Lady of Peace in Yamoussoukro, Ivory Coast.

The Catholic Church in Ivory Coast is part of the worldwide Catholic Church, under the spiritual leadership of the Pope in Rome. Catholicism arrived in Ivory Coast through the arrival of French settlers.

The Catholic Church is the world's largest Christian church, and its largest religious grouping. There are an estimated 2.8 million baptised Catholics in Ivory Coast, 17.2% of the population (according to the 2014 Census), in 15 dioceses. There are 2,000 priests and 1,200 men and women in religious orders.

The Basilica of Our Lady of Peace of Yamoussoukro in Yamoussoukro, is the largest church in the world, larger even than St. Peter's Basilica in Rome.

== History ==
=== Origins ===
In 1634, the first missionaries, six Capuchin firars from Saint-Malo, landed at Abiany, today called Assinie. Though they were initially welcomed by the locals, the mission failed as four of the priests died due to fever and the remaining two fled to the Portuguese fort in Axim in 1638.

=== Modernity ===
In 1961, upon invitation from local Catholics participating at the "International Meetings" at the monastery of Toumliline, the Benedictine established the monastery of St. Marie de Bouake. The Capuchins maintain again a presence in the country since December 1976, and the mission was proclaimed a Custody on 1 January 1984. Bernard Yago became the first cardinal of the country on 2 February 1983 when he was consecrated by Pope John Paul II as Cardinal-Priest of San Crisogono. He was one of the few priests in the Ivory Coast who openly opposed the construction of the gargantuan basilica, modeled on St. Peter's Basilica in Vatican City, built by the former president Félix Houphouët-Boigny in his home village of Yamoussoukro because of the enormous waste of hundreds of millions of dollars, and attempted to persuade Pope John Paul II from consecrating it during his visit to the country.

Due to the presence of around 3,000 Lebanese Maronites, there is also a Maronite parish in Abidjan that was founded in 1954 by the Lebanese Maronite Order. The parish belongs to the Maronite Catholic Eparchy of the Annunciation.

== Organisation ==
Within Ivory Coast the hierarchy consists of:

- Roman Catholic Archdiocese of Abidjan
  - Roman Catholic Diocese of Agboville
  - Roman Catholic Diocese of Grand-Bassam
  - Roman Catholic Diocese of Yopougon
- Roman Catholic Archdiocese of Bouaké
  - Roman Catholic Diocese of Abengourou
  - Roman Catholic Diocese of Bondoukou
  - Roman Catholic Diocese of Yamoussoukro
- Roman Catholic Archdiocese of Gagnoa
  - Roman Catholic Diocese of Daloa
  - Roman Catholic Diocese of Man
  - Roman Catholic Diocese of San Pedro-en-Côte d'Ivoire
- Roman Catholic Archdiocese of Korhogo
  - Roman Catholic Diocese of Katiola
  - Roman Catholic Diocese of Odienné
- Maronite Catholic Eparchy of the Annunciation

== See also ==
- Mario Roberto Cassari
- Monsignor Ambrose Madtha
- Joseph Spiteri
