= List of Catholic dioceses in Senegal =

The (Roman) Catholic Church in Senegal is composed solely of a Latin hierarchy,
comprising a single ecclesiastical province, coinciding with the country,
consisting of the Metropolitan see (in the capital Dakar) and six suffragan dioceses.

There is no national Episcopal Conference of Senegal but capital Dakar hosts and its episcopate partakes in the transnational Romance languages West African Conférence des Evêques du Sénégal, de la Mauritanie, du Cap-Vert et de Guinée-Bissau, jointly with two francophone neighbours (fellow ex-French colonies) Sénégal and Mauritania, and with lusophone (ex-Portuguese colonies) Cape Verde and Guinea-Bissau.
The Anglophone Gambia (an enclave in Senegal) however forms a conference with (also ex-British) Sierra Leone.

There are no Eastern Catholic, pre-diocesan or other exempt jurisdictions.

There are no titular sees. All defunct jurisdictions are predecessors of current sees.

There is an Apostolic Nunciature to Senegal (in national capital Dakar) as embassy-level papal diplomatic representation. In it are also vested to Apostolic Nunciatures to episcopal conference-partners Cape Verde and Guinea-Bissau as well as the Apostolic Delegation (lower level) the last partner Mauritania.

== Current Latin dioceses ==
=== Ecclesiastical Province of Dakar ===
- Metropolitan Archdiocese of Dakar
  - Diocese of Kaolack
  - Diocese of Kolda
  - Diocese of Saint-Louis du Sénégal
  - Diocese of Tambacounda
  - Diocese of Thiès
  - Diocese of Ziguinchor.

== See also ==
- Catholic Church in Senegal
- List of Catholic dioceses (structured view)

== Sources and external links ==
- GCatholic.org - data for all sections.
- Catholic-Hierarchy entry.
