= Joseph Francis Badji =

Senegalese Catholic prelate (born 1966)

The Most Reverend Joseph Francis Badji
- Coadjutor Bishop of Kolda, Senegal
- Church: Catholic Church
- Archdiocese: Roman Catholic Archdiocese of Dakar
- See: Diocese of Kolda
- Appointed: 10 January 2026
- Installed: 11 April 2026

Orders
- Ordination: 28 December 1994
- Consecration: 11 April 2026
- Rank: Bishop

Personal details
- Born: Joseph Francis Badji; 1 January 1966 (age 60) Ziguinchor, Diocese of Ziguinchor, Ziguinchor Region, Senegal
- Motto: "Humility and trust"

Styles of Joseph Francis Badji
- Reference style: Your Lordship; The Most Reverend
- Spoken style: His Lordship
- Religious style: Bishop

Joseph Francis Badji (born 1 January 1966) is a Senegalese Catholic prelate who was appointed Coadjutor Bishop the Roman Catholic Diocese of Kolda, in Senegal, on 10 January 2026. Before that, he served as a priest of the Diocese of Ziguinchor, in Senegal from 28 December 1994 until 10 January 2026. He was appointed bishop by Pope Leo XIV. He was consecrated bishop at Kolda, Senegal on 11 April 2026. The Principal Consecrator was André Guèye, Archbishop of Dakar.

== Background and education ==
He was born on 1 January 1966 in Ziguinchor, Diocese of Ziguinchor, Ziguinchor Region, Senegal. He studied philosophy at the Interdiocesan Major Seminary of Saint Jean Marie Vianney, in Brin, Senegal. He then studied theology at the Grand Séminaire François Libermann in Sebikhotane. He holds a Master's degree in philosophy from the Catholic University of West Africa, in Abidjan, Ivory Coast.

== Priest ==
He was ordained a priest on 28 December 1994 for the Diocese of Ziguinchor. He served as a priest until 10 January 2026 by Maixent Coly, Coadjutor Bishop of Ziguinchor. While a priest, he served in various roles and locations, including:

- Vicar of the Cathédrale Notre-Dame des Victoires, in Kolda from 1994 until 1997.
- Formator and professor of philosophy at the Interdiocesan Major Seminary of Saint Jean Marie Vianney, in Brin, Senegal from 2001 until 2026.
- Head of the ongoing formation of priests from 2011 until 2016.
- Rector of the Interdiocesan Major Seminary of Saint Jean Marie Vianney in Brin from 2017 until 2026.

== Bishop ==
On 10 January 2026, Pope Leo XIV appointed Reverend Father Monsignor Joseph Francis Badji, previously a member of the clergy of Ziguinchor, Senegal as Coadjutor Bishop of the Diocese of Kolda, in Senegal. He is expected to work with Bishop Jean-Pierre Bassène, the current Local Ordinary of Kolda Diocese, who is close to attaining the mandatory retirement age for Catholic Bishops. Bishop-Elect Joseph Francis Badji, shall succeed at Kolda, when the seat falls vacant in the future.

His episcopal consecration and installation took place on 11 April 2026, at Kolda, Senegal. The Principal Consecrator was André Guèye, Archbishop of Dakar assisted by Jean-Pierre Bassène, Bishop of Kolda and Waldemar Stanisław Sommertag, Titular Archbishop of Traiectum ad Mosam.

== See also ==
- Catholic Church in Senegal

== Succession table ==
Catholic Church titles
Preceded by	Coadjutor Bishop-Elect of Kolda (since 10 January 2026)	Succeeded by
