= Augustin Simmel Ndiaye =

Senegalesse Roman Catholic prelate (born 1959)

The Most Reverend Augustin Simmel Ndiaye
- Bishop of Saint-Louis du Sénégal
- Church: Catholic Church
- Archdiocese: Roman Catholic Archdiocese of Dakar
- See: Roman Catholic Diocese of Saint-Louis du Sénégal
- Appointed: 2 April 2025
- Installed: 12 July 2025
- Predecessor: Ernest Sambou
- Successor: Incumbent

Orders
- Ordination: 9 April 1983
- Consecration: 12 July 2025. by Benjamin Ndiaye
- Rank: Bishop

Personal details
- Born: Augustin Simmel Ndiaye; 2 January 1959 (age 66); Fadiouth, Thiès Region, Senegal

Styles of Augustin Simmel Ndiaye
- Reference style: Your Lordship; The Most Reverend
- Spoken style: His Lordship
- Religious style: Bishop

Augustin Simmel Ndiaye (born 2 January 1959) is a Senegalese Roman Catholic who was appointed Bishop of the Roman Catholic Diocese of Saint-Louis du Sénégal in Senegal on 2 April 2025 by Pope Francis. He previously served a priest of the Roman Catholic Archdiocese of Dakar. He was consecrated and installed at Saint-Louis on 12 July 2025.

== Background and education ==
He was born on 2 January 1959 in Fadiouth, Thiès Region, Senegal. He attended the François Libermann Interdiocesan Major Seminary in Sébikhotane, near Dakar, where he studied both Philosophy and theology. He also holds a Doctor of Philosophy in Canon Law, awarded by the Pontifical Urban University in Rome, Italy. He was ordained a priest of the Archdiocese of Dakar on 9 April 1983.

== Priesthood ==
He was ordained a priest of the Archdiocese of Dakar on 9 April 1983. He served in that capacity until 2 April 2025.

He served in various roles and locations while a priest, including as:

- Vicar at the Cathedral of Notre-Dame des Victoires in Dakar from 1983 until 1988.
- Professor of Canon law at the François Libermann Major Seminary at Sébikhotane, Senegal from 1992 until 2014.
- Rector of the François Libermann Major Seminary at Sébikhotane from 1998 until 2005.
- President of the Union of Senegalese Clergy from 1996 until 1999.
- Rector of the Catholic University of West Africa (UCAO) in Ouagadougou, Burkina Faso from 2020 until 2025.

== As bishop ==
On 2 April 2025, Pope Francis appointed him as Bishop of the Roman Catholic Diocese of Saint-Louis du Sénégal. He succeeded Bishop Emeritus Ernest Sambou, whose age-related retirement took effect on 12 January 2023. On that day, Archbishop André Guèye of the Archdiocese of Dakar was appointed Apostolic Administrator of the Catholic Diocese of Saint-Louis du Sénégal. Reverend Augustin Simmel Ndiaye was consecrated and installed as bishop of Saint-Louis, Senegal on 12 July 2025. The Principal Consecrator was Benjamin Ndiaye, Archbishop Emeritus of Dakar assisted by Victor Ndione, Bishop of Nouakchott and Dèr Raphaël Kusiélé Dabiré, Bishop of Diébougou.

== See also ==
- Catholic Church in Senegal

== Succession table ==
Catholic Church titles
Preceded by Ernest Sambou (22 February 2003 - 12 January 2023)	Bishop of Saint-Louis du Sénégal (since 2 April 2025)	Succeeded by Incumbent
