= Jean-Pierre Bassène =

Senegalese Roman Catholic prelate (born 1951)

The Most Reverend Jean-Pierre Bassène
- Bishop of Kolda, Senegal
- Church: Catholic Church
- Archdiocese: Roman Catholic Archdiocese of Dakar
- See: Kolda
- Appointed: 22 December 1999
- Installed: 29 April 2000
- Successor: Incumbent
- Other post: Apostolic Administrator the Roman Catholic Diocese of Tambacounda (5 August 2017 - 6 February 2022)

Orders
- Ordination: 11 April 1980
- Consecration: 29 April 2000 by Augustin Sagna
- Rank: Bishop

Personal details
- Born: Jean-Pierre Bassène; 1 August 1951 (age 74) Essyl, Apostolic Vicariate of Ziguinchor, Ziguinchor Region, Senegal

Styles of Jean-Pierre Bassène
- Reference style: Your Lordship; The Most Reverend
- Spoken style: His Lordship
- Religious style: Bishop

Jean-Pierre Bassène (born 5 December 1960) is a Senegalese Catholic prelate who is the Bishop of the Roman Catholic Diocese of Tambacounda, Senegal since 4 November 2021. Before that, from 25 January 2012 until 4 November 2021, he was the Bishop of the Roman Catholic Diocese of Ziguinchor, Senegal. Prior to then he served as Apostolic Administrator of the Roman Catholic Diocese of Ziguinchor from 21 July 2010 until 25 January 2012. He was appointed bishop on 25 January 2012 by Pope Benedict XVI and was consecrated at Ziguinchor on 21 April 2012. His installation as Bishop of Tambacounda, took place on 6 February 2022.

== Background and education ==
He was born on 5 December 1960, at Cabrousse, Diocese of Ziguinchor, Ziguinchor Region, Senegal. He studied at Saint Louise Minor Seminary Ziguinchor from 1975 until 1982. He then studied at the Sebikhotane Major Seminary in the Archdiocese of Dakar, Senegal. He was ordained priest on 8 April 1988.

== Priesthood ==
On 8 April 1988 he was ordained a priest of the Diocese of Ziguinchor, Senegal. He served in that capacity until 25 Jan 2012. While still a priest, he was appointed Apostolic Administrator of the Roman Catholic Diocese of Ziguinchor on 21 July 2010.

== As bishop ==
Pope John Paul II appointed him as Bishop of the Roman Catholic Diocese of Kolda on 22 December 1999. He was consecrated and installed at Kolda, Senegal on 29 April 2000 by the hands of Bishop Augustin Sagna, Bishop Emeritus of Ziguinchor assisted by Archbishop Bernard Agré, Archbishop of Abidjan and Archbishop Robert Sarah, Archbishop of Conakry.

On 5 August 2017, Pope Francis appointed him Apostolic Administrator of the Roman Catholic Diocese of Tambacounda. That apostolic administration ceased on 6 February 2022, the day Bishop Paul Abel Mamba Diatta was installed at Tambacounda as the new Local Ordinary for that diocese.

Bishop Jean-Pierre Bassène was the president of Caritas Senegal in 2015.

== See also ==
- Catholic Church in Senegal

== Succession table ==
Catholic Church titles
Preceded by None (Diocese erected)	Bishop of Kolda (since 22 December 1999)	Succeeded by Incumbent
