= Benjamin Ndiaye =

Senegalese Catholic prelate (born in 1948)

The Most Reverend Benjamin Ndiaye
- Archbishop Emeritus of Dakar, Senegal
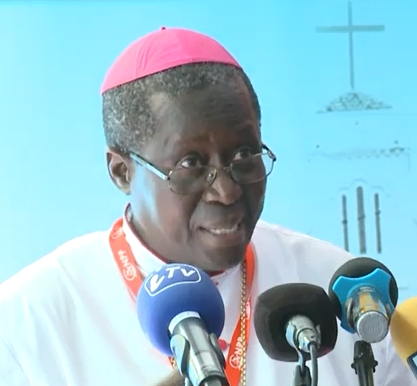
- Church: Catholic Church
- Archdiocese: Roman Catholic Archdiocese of Dakar
- See: Dakar
- Appointed: 22 December 2014
- Installed: 21 February 2015
- Term ended: 22 February 2025
- Predecessor: Théodore-Adrien Sarr
- Successor: André Guèye

Orders
- Ordination: 21 August 1977
- Consecration: 24 November 2001 by Théodore-Adrien Sarr
- Rank: Archbishop

Personal details
- Born: Benjamin Ndiaye; 28 October 1948 (age 77) Fadiouth, Thiès Region, Senegal

Styles of Benjamin Ndiaye
- Reference style: Your Lordship; The Most Reverend
- Spoken style: His Lordship
- Religious style: Archbishop

Benjamin Ndiaye (born 28 October 1948) is a Senegalese Catholic prelate who served as Archbishop of the Roman Catholic Archdiocese of Dakar, Senegal, from 22 December 2014 until his age-related retirement on 22 February 2025. Before that, from 15 June 2001 until 22 December 2014, he was the bishop of the Roman Catholic Diocese of Kaolack, Senegal. He was appointed bishop on 15 June 2001 by Pope John Paul II. He was consecrated and installed at Kaolack, on 24 November 2001 by Archbishop Théodore-Adrien Sarr, Archbishop of Dakar. His age-related request to retire from the pastoral care of the metropolitan archdiocese of Dakar, Senegal, was accepted on 22 February 2025 by Pope Francis, and Bishop André Guèye was appointed as his successor as the archbishop of Dakar.

== Background and education ==
He was born on 28 October 1948, in Fadiouth, Thiès Region, Senegal. He studied at seminaries and universities in Senegal, Fribourg in Switzerland, Jerusalem and Paris, France.

== Priest ==
He was ordained a priest on 21 August 1977 by Cardinal Hyacinthe Thiandoum. He served as a priest until 15 June 2001. As a priest he served in many positions of responsibility including as Vicar General of the Archdiocese of Dakar.

== As bishop ==
On 15 Jun 2001, Pope John Paul II appointed him as bishop of the Roman Catholic Diocese of Kaolack, Senegal. He was consecrated and installed at Kaolack on 24 November 2001 by the hands of Archbishop Théodore-Adrien Sarr, Archbishop of Dakar assisted by Bishop Pierre Sagna, Bishop of Saint-Louis du Sénégal and Bishop Jacques Yandé Sarr, Bishop of Thiès.

On 22 December 2014, Pope Benedict XVI appointed him archbishop of the ecclesiastical province of Dakar. He succeeded Cardinal Théodore-Adrien Sarr, who retired. Archbishop Benjamin Ndiaye was installed at Dakar on 21 February 2015. He served there as archbishop until 22 February 2025.

On 22 February 2025, Pope Francis accepted the age-related resignation from the pastoral care of the metropolitan archdiocese of Dakar, Senegal, presented by Archbishop Benjamin Ndiaye. The Holy Father appointed Bishop André Guèye, formerly of the Roman Catholic Diocese of Thiès, Senegal, as the new archbishop at Dakar.

== See also ==
- Catholic Church in Senegal

== Succession table ==
Catholic Church titles
Preceded by Théodore-Adrien Sarr (1 July 1974 - 2 June 2000)	Bishop of Kaolack (15 June 2001 - 22 December 2014)	Succeeded by Martin Boucar Tine (since 25 July 2018)
Preceded by Théodore-Adrien Sarr (2 June 2000 - 22 December 2014))	Archbishop of Dakar (22 December 2014 - 22 February 2025)	Succeeded by André Guèye (since 22 February 2025)
