= Jean Baptiste Valter Manga =

Senegalese Roman Catholic prelate (born 1972)

The Most Reverend Jean Baptiste Valter Manga
- Bishop of Ziguinchor, Senegal
- Church: Catholic Church
- Archdiocese: Roman Catholic Archdiocese of Dakar
- See: Ziguinchor
- Appointed: 20 June 2024
- Installed: 24 November 2024
- Predecessor: Paul Abel Mamba Diatta
- Successor: Incumbent

Orders
- Ordination: 20 December 2000
- Consecration: 23 November 2024 by Jean-Pierre Bassène
- Rank: Bishop

Personal details
- Born: Jean Baptiste Valter Manga; 18 June 1972 (age 52); Oussouye, Diocese of Ziguinchor, Ziguinchor Region, Senegal

Styles of Jean Baptiste Valter Manga
- Reference style: Your Lordship; The Most Reverend
- Spoken style: His Lordship
- Religious style: Bishop

Jean Baptiste Valter Manga (born 18 June 1972) is a Senegalese Catholic prelate who is the Bishop of the Roman Catholic Diocese of Ziguinchor, Senegal since 20 June 2024. Before that, from 20 December 2000 until 20 June 2024, he was a priest of the Catholic Diocese of Ziguinchor. He was appointed bishop on 20 June 2024 by Pope Francis and was consecrated on 23 November 2024. He was installed as Bishop of Ziguinchor on 24 November 2024.

== Background and education ==
He was born on 18 June 1972, at Oussouye, Diocese of Ziguinchor, Ziguinchor Region, Senegal. He studied at the Philosophical Seminary of Brin from 1993 until 1995 where he studied philosophy. He then transferred to the Major Seminary of Sebikhotane near Dakar, where he studied theology, from 1995 until 2000. In 2009, he graduated with a degree in biblical theology from the Collège des Bernardins in Paris, France. He also holds a Doctorate in ethnology and anthropology from the Ecole des Hautes Etudes en Sciences Sociales (EHESS), also in Paris, obtained in 2015.

== Priesthood ==
On 20 December 2000 he was ordained a priest of the Diocese of Ziguinchor, Senegal. He served in that capacity until 20 June 2024.

While a priest, he served in various roles and locations, including:

- Professor of mathematics and natural sciences at the Ziguinchor Minor Seminary from 2000 until 2006.
- Head of the vocations commission at the Ziguinchor Minor Seminary from 2000 until 2006.
- Parish priest of St. Benedict Parish in Nema, Senegal from 2015 until 2021.
- Professor at the Major Seminary of Brin, Senegal since 2015.
- Professor at the Assane Seck University of Ziguinchor since 2015.
- Vicar of the parish of Nyassia, Diocese of Ziguinchor from 2021 until 2023.
- Secretary General of the Diocesan Office of Pastoral Care and responsible for the ongoing formation of priests, since 2021.
- Vice-rector of the Interdiocesan Major Seminary of Saint Jean Marie Vianney de Brin from 2023 until 2024.
- Vicar of the parish of the Good Shepherd of Enampore FROM 2023 until 2024.

== As bishop ==
Pope Francis appointed him as Bishop of the Roman Catholic Diocese of Ziguinchor on 20 June 2024. He was consecrated on 23 November 2024 by the hands of Bishop Jean-Pierre Bassène, Bishop of Kolda assisted by Bishop Paul Abel Mamba Diatta, Bishop of Tambacounda and Archbishop Éric Marie de Moulins d'Amieu de Beaufort, Archbishop of Reims. Bishop Jean Baptiste Valter Manga was installed at Ziguinchor, Senegal the next day, on 24 November 2024.

== See also ==
- Catholic Church in Senegal

== Succession table ==
Catholic Church titles
Preceded by Paul Abel Mamba Diatta (25 January 2012 - 4 November 2021)	Bishop of Ziguinchor (since 20 June 2024)	Succeeded by Incumbent
