= Paul Abel Mamba Diatta =

Senegalese Roman Catholic prelate (born 1967)

The Most Reverend Paul Abel Mamba Diatta
- Bishop of Tambacounda, Senegal
- Church: Catholic Church
- Archdiocese: Roman Catholic Archdiocese of Dakar
- See: Tambacounda
- Appointed: 4 November 2021
- Installed: 6 February 2022
- Predecessor: Jean-Noël Diouf
- Successor: Incumbent
- Other posts: Apostolic Administrator the Roman Catholic Diocese of Ziguinchor (21 July 2010 - 25 Jan 2012); Bishop of the Roman Catholic Diocese of Ziguinchor (25 January 2012 - 4 November 2021)

Orders
- Ordination: 8 April 1988
- Consecration: 21 April 2012 by Théodore-Adrien Sarr
- Rank: Bishop

Personal details
- Born: Paul Abel Mamba Diatta; 5 December 1960 (age 65) Cabrousse, Diocese of Ziguinchor, Ziguinchor Region, Senegal
- Motto: "Rien n'est impossible à Dieu" (Nothing is impossible for God)

Styles of Paul Abel Mamba Diatta
- Reference style: Your Lordship; The Most Reverend
- Spoken style: His Lordship
- Religious style: Bishop

Paul Abel Mamba Diatta (born 5 December 1960) is a Senegalese Catholic prelate who is the Bishop of the Roman Catholic Diocese of Tambacounda, Senegal since 4 November 2021. Before that, from 25 January 2012 until 4 November 2021, he was the Bishop of the Roman Catholic Diocese of Ziguinchor, Senegal. Prior to then he served as Apostolic Administrator of the Roman Catholic Diocese of Ziguinchor from 21 July 2010 until 25 January 2012. He was appointed bishop on 25 January 2012 by Pope Benedict XVI and was consecrated at Ziguinchor on 21 April 2012. His installation as Bishop of Tambacounda, took place on 6 February 2022.

== Background and education ==
He was born on 5 December 1960, at Cabrousse, Diocese of Ziguinchor, Ziguinchor Region, Senegal. He studied at Saint Louise Minor Seminary Ziguinchor from 1975 until 1982. He then studied at the Sebikhotane Major Seminary in the Archdiocese of Dakar, Senegal. He was ordained priest on 8 April 1988.

== Priesthood ==
On 8 April 1988 he was ordained a priest of the Diocese of Ziguinchor, Senegal. He served in that capacity until 25 Jan 2012. While still a priest, he was appointed Apostolic Administrator of the Roman Catholic Diocese of Ziguinchor on 21 July 2010.

== As bishop ==
Pope Benedict XVI appointed him as Bishop of the Roman Catholic Diocese of Ziguinchor, on 25 January 2012. He was consecrated and installed at Ziguinchor, Senegal on 21 April 2012 by the hands of Cardinal Théodore-Adrien Sarr, Archbishop of Dakar assisted by Bishop Jean-Noël Diouf, Bishop of Tambacounda and Bishop Jean-Pierre Bassène, Bishop of Kolda.

On 4 November 2021, Pope Francis appointed him Bishop of the Roman Catholic Diocese of Tambacounda. He was installed at Tambacounda on 6 February 2022.

== See also ==
- Catholic Church in Senegal

== Succession table ==
Catholic Church titles
Preceded by Maixent Coly (23 October 1995 - 24 August 2010)	Bishop of Ziguinchor (25 January 2012 - 4 November 2021)	Succeeded by Jean Baptiste Valter Manga (since 20 June 2024)
Preceded by Jean-Noël Diouf (17 April 1989 - 5 August 2017)	Bishop of Tambacounda (since 4 November 2021)	Succeeded by Incumbent
