= Alexandre Le Roy =

French archbishop

Alexandre Le Roy, C.S.Sp.
- Titular Archbishop of Caria (13 May 1921 – 21 April 1938)
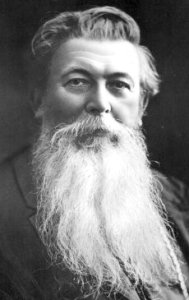
- See: Apostolic Vicariate of Gabon
- Installed: 3 June 1892
- Term ended: 24 May 1896
- Predecessor: Pierre-Marie Le Berre
- Successor: Jean Martin Adam
- Other post: Superior General of the Congregation of the Holy Spirit (1896 – 1926)

Orders
- Ordination: 10 August 1876
- Consecration: 9 October 1892 by Abel-Anastase Germain

Personal details
- Born: 19 January 1854 Saint-Senier-de-Beuvron, France
- Died: 21 April 1938 (aged 84)
- Denomination: Roman Catholic Church

Alexandre-Louis-Victor-Aimé Le Roy, C.S.Sp. (19 January 1854 – 21 April 1938) was a French-born archbishop of the Roman Catholic Church, and the Superior General of the Congregation of the Holy Spirit. He served as Vicar Apostolic of Gabon (now the Archdiocese of Libreville) from 1892 until 1896. He was later consecrated Titular Archbishop of Caria in 1921.

== Life ==
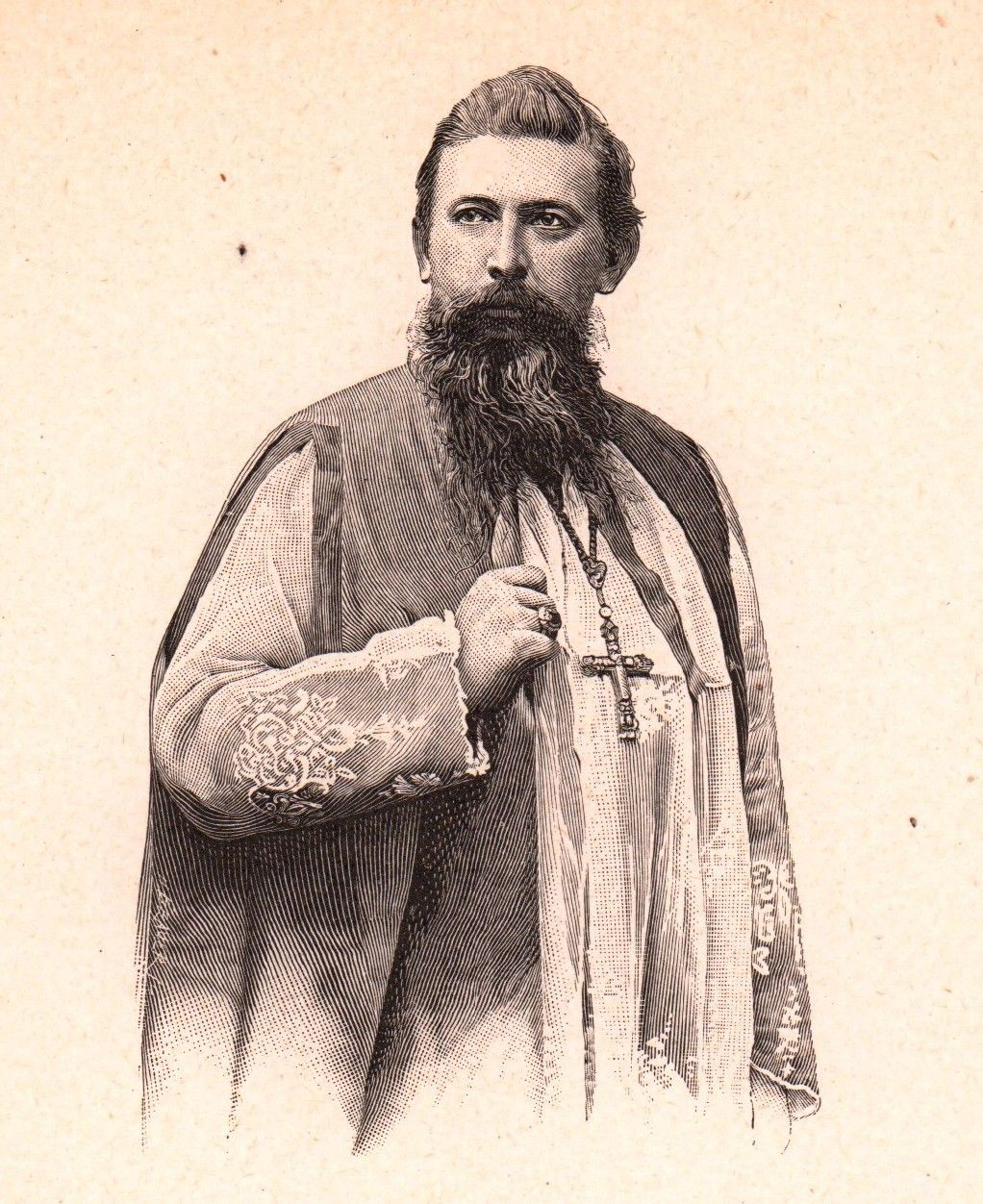
Bishop Le Roy in 1903

Alexandre Le Roy was born on 19 January 1854 in Saint-Senier-de-Beuvron, France, the son of Norman farmers. Le Roy received a secondary education at the Abbaye Blanche in Mortain. He went on to study philosophy at the Seminary of the Diocese of Coutances.

On 10 August 1876, at the age of 22, he was ordained a priest of the Congregation of the Holy Spirit. After his ordination, he worked as an educator in the Collège Saint-Denis in Réunion, the Collège de Cellule, France and Pondicherry, India. Le Roy first traveled to Africa in 1881—he accompanied an expedition to Bagamoyo, Tanzania, scouting for potential mission sites; he took the opportunity to write books and magazine articles, which were highly appreciated in Europe.

He was appointed Vicar Apostolic of Gabon on 3 July 1892, with a titular bishopric (Alinda); on 9 October 1892 he was consecrated as apostolic vicar, which he held until 24 May 1896. On 24 May 1896 he was appointed Superior General of his order. He was granted a titular archbishopric (Caria) on 13 May 1921. He retired as superior general on 18 June 1926, and died on 21 April 1938 at the age of 84.

The Collège Saint-Alexandre in Gatineau, Canada, was named in honor of Archbishop Le Roy. It was Le Roy who sent Father Amet Limbour to Canada, with a mission to found a school of agriculture for French emigrants to Quebec.

== Coat of arms ==
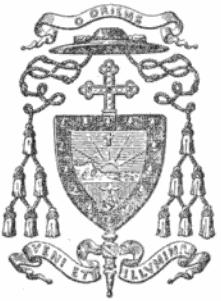

The following blazon for Archbishop Le Roy's coat of arms is taken from Armorial des prélats français du XIXe siècle.

Shield: Au 1 d'azur à la falaise d'argent mouvant du flanc dextre d l'écu, baignée d'une mer du même mouvant du flanc sénestre, de laquelle naît un soleil d'or surmonté d'une croisette latine du même (symbole de la lumière de l'Evangile qui se lève sur l'Afrique); au 2 de gueules aux emblèmes du S. E. d'argent (moins le rinceau et la gloire); à la bordure du tout de sable chargée de 14 coquilles d'argent (rappelant la Basse-Normandie et le Mont-Saint-Michel).

Motto: O Oriens veni et illumina.

== Bibliography ==
- Le Roy, Alexandre (1922). The Religion of the Primitives. New York: MacMillan Company.

Catholic Church titles
Preceded by Pierre-Marie Le Berre	Vicar Apostolic of Gabon; 1892–1896	Succeeded by Jean Martin Adam
Preceded by Ambroise Emonet	Superior General of the Congregation of the Holy Spirit; 1896–1926	Succeeded by Louis Le Hunsec
