= Jacques Sarr =

Senegalese Roman Catholic bishop

- Bishop of Thiès
- Church: Catholic Church
- Diocese: Diocese of Thiès
- In office: 17 October 1986 – 18 January 2011
- Predecessor: François-Xavier Dione
- Successor: André Guèye

Orders
- Ordination: 28 May 1964 by Hyacinthe Thiandoum
- Consecration: 1 March 1987 by Hyacinthe Thiandoum

Personal details
- Born: 11 October 1934 Fadiouth, French Senegal, French West Africa, French Empire
- Died: 18 January 2011 (aged 76)

Jacques Yandé Sarr (11 October 1934 – 18 January 2011) was the Roman Catholic bishop of the Roman Catholic Diocese of Thiès, Senegal.

Ordained to the priesthood in 1964, Sarr was appointed bishop of the Thiès Diocese in 1987 dying in office.
