= Martin Boucar Tine =

Senegalese Roman Catholic prelate (born 1966)

The Most Reverend Martin Boucar Tine
- Bishop of Kaolack, Senegal
- Church: Catholic Church
- Archdiocese: Roman Catholic Archdiocese of Dakar
- See: Kaolack
- Appointed: 25 July 2018
- Installed: 24 November 2018
- Predecessor: Benjamin Ndiaye
- Successor: Incumbent

Orders
- Ordination: 6 July 1996
- Consecration: 24 November 2018 by Michael Wallace Banach
- Rank: Bishop

Personal details
- Born: Martin Boucar Tine; 16 September 1966 (age 58); Koudiadiène, Diocese of Thiès, Thiès Region, Senegal

Styles of Martin Boucar Tine
- Reference style: Your Lordship; The Most Reverend
- Spoken style: His Lordship
- Religious style: Bishop

Martin Boucar Tine S.S.S. (born 16 September 1966) is a Senegalese Roman Catholic prelate who serves as the Bishop of the Roman Catholic Diocese of Kaolack, Senegal. He was appointed bishop of Kaolack, on 25 July 2018 by Pope Francis. He was consecrated and installed at Kaolack on 24 November 2018. He is a member of the Order of the Congregation of the Blessed Sacrament.

== Background and education ==
He was born on 16 September 1966, at Koudiadiène, Diocese of Thiès, Thiès Region, Senegal. He attended Ngasobil Minor Seminary before he entered Sacraments Fathers College Saint Gabriel and Le collège Sacré-cœur de Dakar, where he began his priestly formation. He studied Philosophy at Saint Augustin Centre Sénégal in Dakar.

He studied at Lonzo, in the Democratic Republic of the Congo, graduating with a Bachelor's degree in Theology from the l'Institut Saint Eugène de Mazenod de Kinshasa. He then graduated with a Licentiate in Dogmatic Theology from the Catholic University of the Congo in Kinshasa. He was ordained a priest on 6 July 1996.

== Priesthood ==
He took his perpetual vows as a member of the Order of the Congregation of the Blessed Sacrament on 6 October 1995. He was then ordained a priest of that religious order on 6 July 1996. He served in that capacity until 25 July 2018. He served in various roles and locations while a priest, as detailed in the reference at the end of this paragraph. While a priest, he served as the Vicar General of the Congregation of the Blessed Sacrament.

== As bishop ==
On 25 Jul 2018, Pope Francis appointed him as Bishop of the Roman Catholic Diocese of Kaolack. He was consecrated at Kaolack, Diocese of Kaolack, Senegal on 25 November 2018 by the hands of Archbishop Michael Wallace Banach, Titular Archbishop of Memphis, assisted by Archbishop Benjamin Ndiaye, Archbishop of Dakar and Cardinal Théodore-Adrien Sarr, Archbishop Emeritus of Dakar. As of March 2025, he is the Ordinary Bishop of the Diocese of Kaolack, Senegal.

== See also ==
- Catholic Church in Senegal

== Succession table ==
Catholic Church titles
Preceded by Benjamin Ndiaye (15 June 2001 - 22 December 2014)	Bishop of Kaolack (since 25 July 2018)	Succeeded by Incumbent
