= Our Lady of Victories Cathedral, Dakar =

Coordinates: 14.6653°N 17.4378°W

Our Lady of Victories Cathedral
- Cathédrale de Dakar
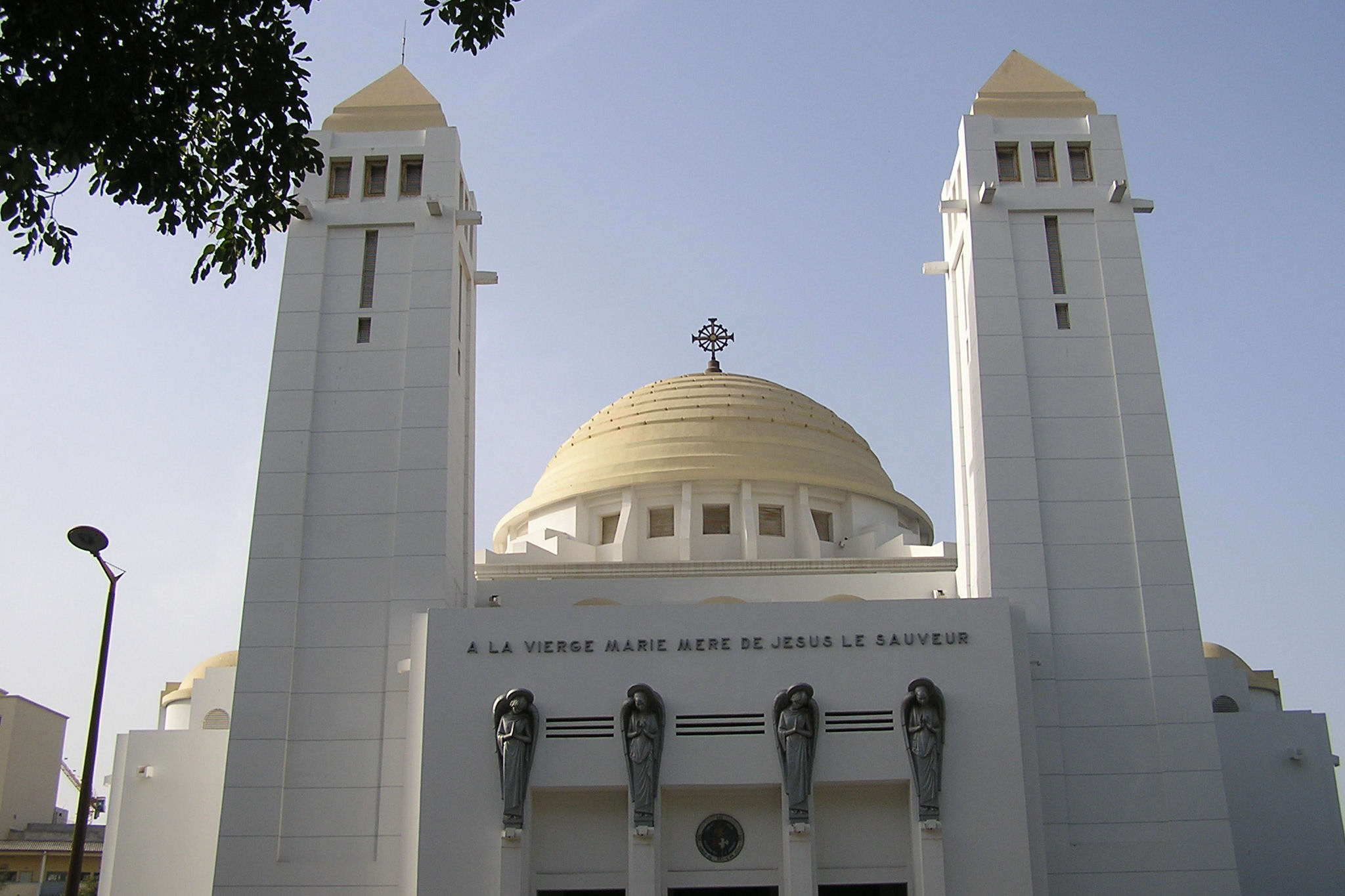
- Our Lady of Victories Cathedral
- Location: Dakar
- Country: Senegal
- Denomination: Roman Catholic Church

The Our Lady of Victories Cathedral (French: Cathédrale Notre Dame des Victoires) or Cathedral of Dakar, is a religious building that serves as the Catholic cathedral in the city of Dakar, the capital of the African country of Senegal, which is the seat of the Archdiocese of Dakar (Latin: Archidioecesis Dakarensis).

The sanctuary was built on the site of an ancient Lebu cemetery, whose land was granted by the government to the church. The construction began in 1924 and the cathedral was consecrated 12 years later, on 2 February 1936, by Cardinal Jean Verdier, archbishop of Paris. In 1964, initial the inscription above the entrance was changed into the current one. In 2001 in the church the funeral of former President Leopold Senghor was performed.

Cardinal Hyacinthe Thiandoum, who died in 2004, is buried in the back of the altar, next to the statue of Our Lady of Victories, patron of the cathedral.

== See also ==
- Roman Catholicism in Senegal
- Our Lady of Victories Cathedral, Yaoundé

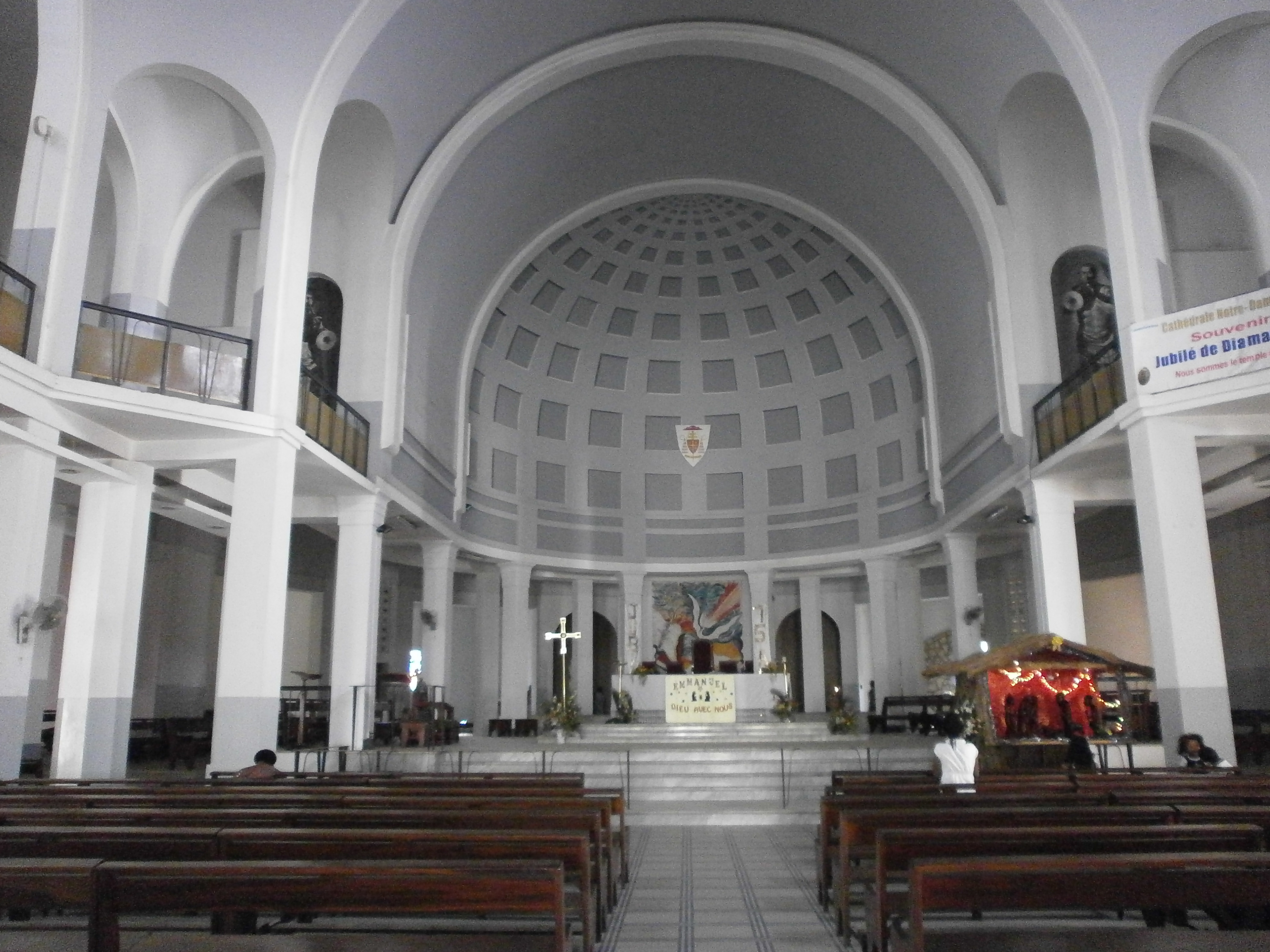
Internal View
