= St. Louis Cathedral (Saint-Louis, Senegal) =

Catholic cathedral in Senegal

Coordinates: 16.0248°N 16.5044°W

- Cathédrale Saint Louis
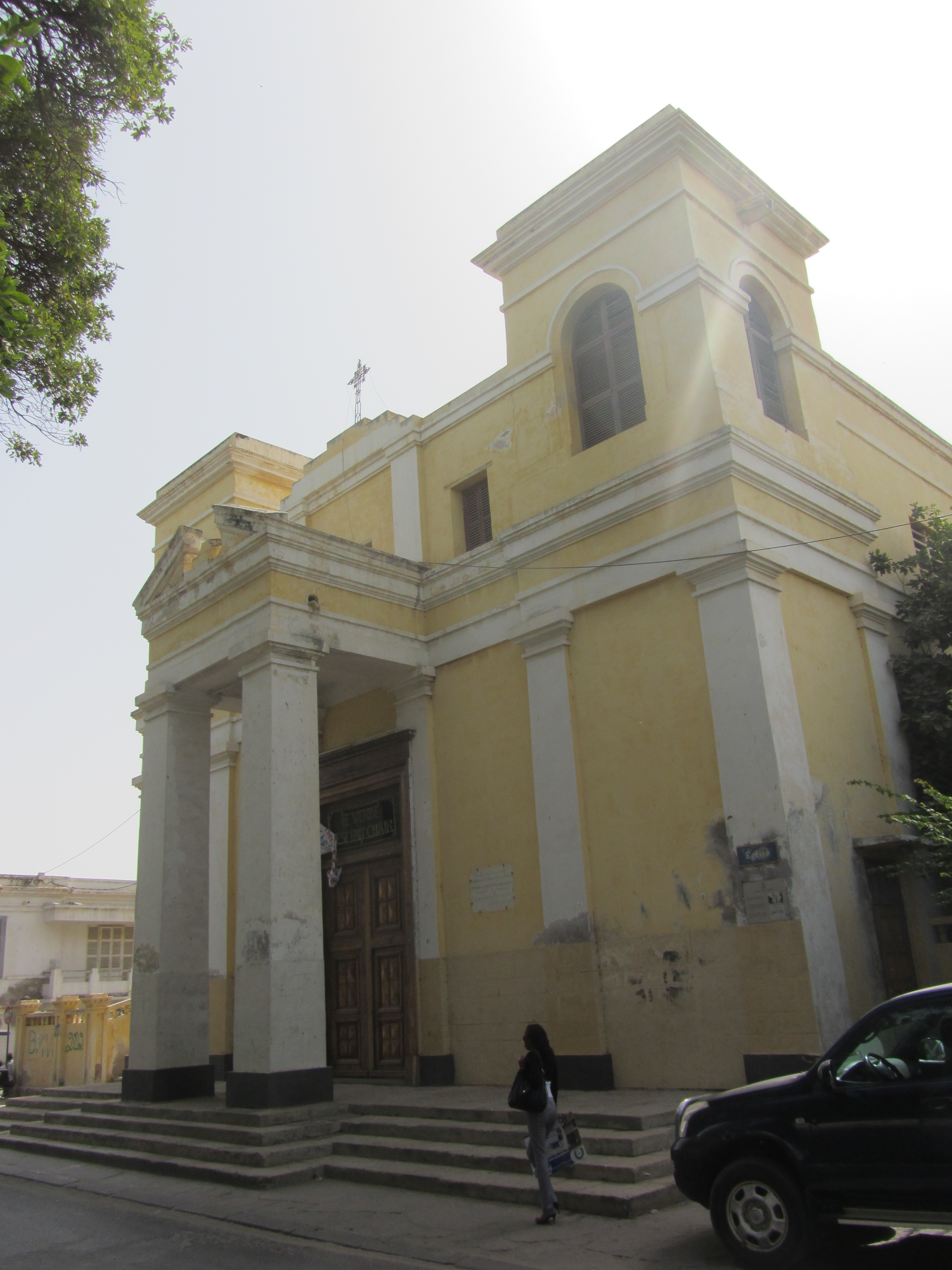
- St. Louis Cathedral
- Location: Saint-Louis
- Country: Senegal
- Denomination: Catholic Church
- Sui iuris church: Latin Church

The Cathedral of St. Louis (French: Cathédrale Saint Louis), located in Saint-Louis, Senegal, is the seat of the Diocese of St-Louis du Sénégal. The nineteenth-century cathedral church is located on the place d'armes in the southern district of Saint-Louis Island.

== History ==
St. Louis Christians did not have a real church for many years; they gathered in several places within the fort, in the military hospital, or homes of individuals, such as John Thevenot, who was mayor from 1765 to 1778. The British captured Senegal during the Seven Years' War and occupied it, during which time they forbade priests and banned all expressions of Catholicism.

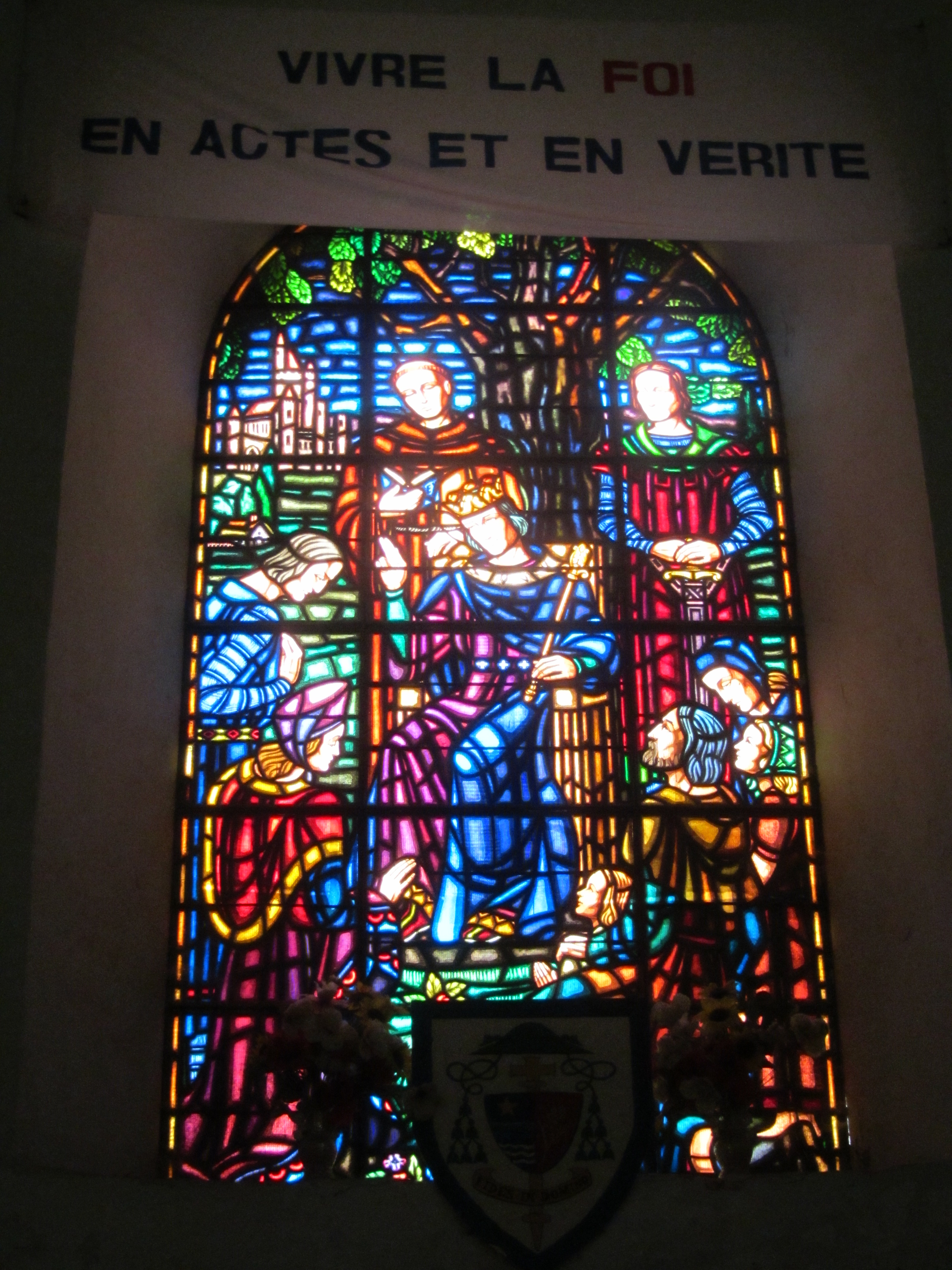
Internal view

The recovery of the colony by the French in January 1817 changed the situation. Anne-Marie Javouhey, founder of the Sisters of St. Joseph of Cluny, arrived in 1822 and promoted construction of a true church. The colonial governor, Baron Jacques-François Roger, laid the foundation stone on 11 February 1827. The building was opened to the faithful on 4 November 1828.

== See also ==
- Catholic Church in Senegal
