= Francis Griffin (priest) =

Irish Spiritan priest (1893–1983)

Francis Griffin C.S.Sp. (1893-1983) was an Irish Spiritan priest who served as Superior General of the Congregation of the Holy Spirit (Spiritans) in the years 1950-1962.

Born in Kilmurray, County Clare in 1893, he was educated locally in Kilmurray and Mullagh and then at Rockwell College from 1907 until 1911, Griffin went to Kimmage Manor to join the Spiritans. Attending University College Dublin studying Irish and French. He taught in Blackrock College from 1913 until 1916, when he moved to Switzerland.

He was ordained in 1920 in Switzerland, Fr. Griffin studied at University of Fribourg in Switzerland, earning a STL in 1921.

Fr Griffin was elected Superior General of the Congregation of the Holy Spirit in 1950, the first non-Frenchman to hold that post.

Catholic Church titles
Preceded by Louis Le Hunsec	Superior General of the Congregation of the Holy Spirit; 1950–1962	Succeeded by Marcel Lefebvre
