= Diocese of Thiès =

Roman Catholic diocese in Senegal

Coordinates: 14.8007°N 16.9304°W

Diocese of Thiès Dioecesis Thiesinus Diocèse de Thiès
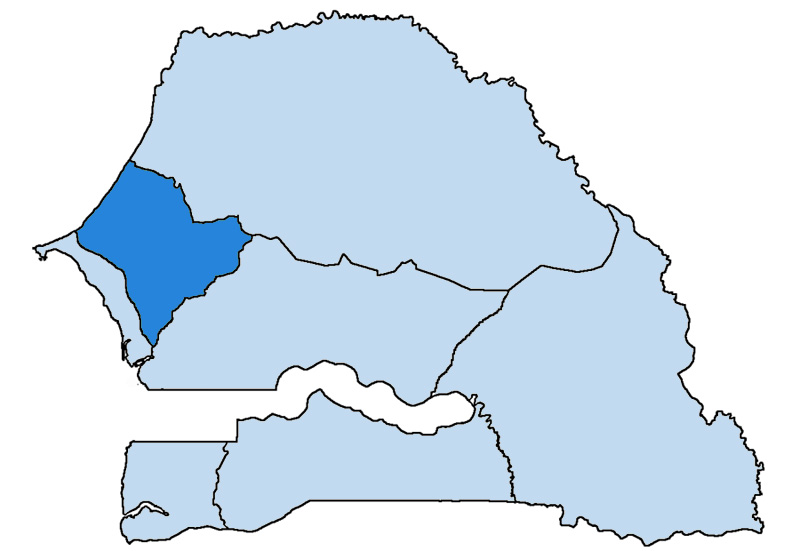
- Diocese of Thiès

Location
- Country: Senegal
- Metropolitan: Archdiocese of Dakar
- Headquarters: Thiès, Thiès region, Senegal

Statistics
- Area: 9,055 km^{2} (3,496 sq mi)
- Population: Total; Catholics: (as of 2023); 4,328,600; 66,830 (1.5%)
- Parishes: 25

Information
- Denomination: Catholic Church
- Sui iuris church: Latin Church
- Rite: Roman Rite
- Established: 6 February 1969; 57 years ago
- Cathedral: Cathédrale Sainte Anne in Thiès
- Secular priests: 83 (76 Diocesan, 7 Religious Orders)

Current leadership
- Pope: Leo XIV
- Bishop: Martin Boucar Tine, S.S.S.
- Metropolitan Archbishop: André Guèye

The Roman Catholic Diocese of Thiès (Latin: Thiesin(us), French: Diocèse catholique romain de Thiès) is a diocese located in the city of Thiès in the ecclesiastical province of Dakar in Senegal.

On Friday, 18 January 2013, Pope Benedict XVI named the Rev. André Gueye as Bishop-designate of the Roman Catholic Diocese of Thiès, to be ordained and installed at a date in the near future (which would be 25 May). Up until then, he had been serving as a member of the Thiès diocesan clergy, and as a professor of philosophy at the Major Seminary of Saint Jean Marie Vianney in Bris, Senegal (in the Roman Catholic Diocese of Ziguinchor in Ziguinchor, Senegal).

== History ==
- 6 February 1969: Established as Diocese of Thiès from the Metropolitan Archdiocese of Dakar

== Special churches ==
- The cathedral is Cathédrale Sainte Anne in Thiès.

== Leadership ==
=== Bishops of Thiès (Roman rite) ===
- François-Xavier Dione (6 February 1969 – 4 February 1985)
- Jacques Sarr (17 October 1986 – 18 January 2011)
- André Guèye (18 January 2013 – 22 February 2025), appointed Archbishop of Dakar
- Martin Boucar Tine, S.S.S. (12 November 2026 – Present)

=== Another priest of this diocese who became bishop ===
- Victor Ndione (2001-2014), appointed Bishop of Nouakchott in 2024

== See also ==
- Roman Catholicism in Senegal
