= Chambaron-sur-Morge =

- Commune
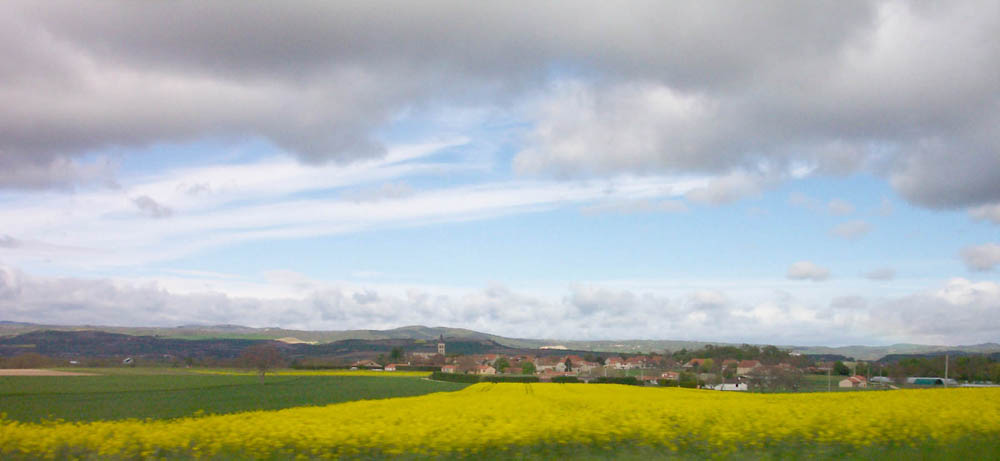
- A general view of La Moutade
- Location of Chambaron-sur-Morge
- Location within France Location within Auvergne-Rhône-Alpes
- Coordinates: 45°57′58″N 3°09′36″E
- Country: France
- Region: Auvergne-Rhône-Alpes
- Department: Puy-de-Dôme
- Arrondissement: Riom
- Canton: Riom
- Intercommunality: CA Riom Limagne et Volcans

Government
  - Mayor (2020–2026): Philippe Gaillard
- Area^{1}: 14.05 km^{2} (5.42 sq mi)
- Population (2023): 1,766
  - Density: 125.7/km^{2} (325.5/sq mi)
- Time zone: UTC+01:00 (CET)
  - Summer (DST): UTC+02:00 (CEST)
- INSEE/Postal code: 63244 /63200
- ^{1} French Land Register data, which excludes lakes, ponds, glaciers > 1 km^{2} (0.386 sq mi or 247 acres) and river estuaries.

Chambaron-sur-Morge (French pronunciation: [ʃɑ̃baʁɔ̃ syʁ mɔʁʒ]; Auvergnat: Chambaron de Mòrja) is a commune in the Puy-de-Dôme department of central France. The municipality was established on 1 January 2016 and consists of the former communes of La Moutade and Cellule.

== Geography ==
The Chambaron‑sur‑Morge commune is located in the Puy‑de‑Dôme department within the Auvergne‑Rhône‑Alpes region in central France. The commune covers an area of approximately 14 km², including agricultural lands and small residential areas. It is situated near the historic city of Riom and a short distance from the regional capital, Clermont‑Ferrand, with the Morge River running through it, forming part of the local landscape.

== Population ==
Year	Residents
1975	796
1982	874
1990	1,076
1999	1,042
2007	1,373
2015	1,676
2023	1,766

== See also ==
- Communes of the Puy-de-Dôme department
