= Diocese of Tambacounda =

Roman Catholic diocese in Senegal

Coordinates: 13.7626°N 13.6742°W

Diocese of Tambacounda Dioecesis Tambacundanus
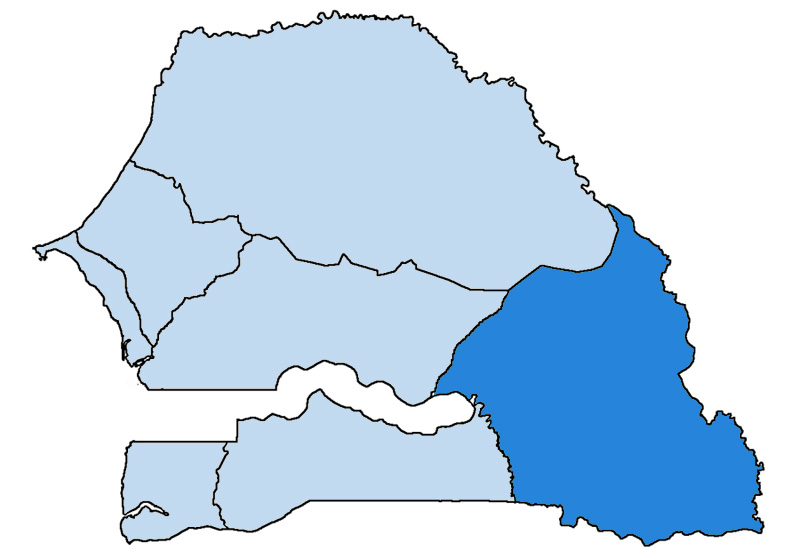
- Diocese of Tambacounda

Location
- Country: Senegal
- Metropolitan: Dakar

Statistics
- Area: 59,602 km^{2} (23,012 sq mi)
- Population: Total; Catholics: (as of 2004); 409,000; 7,500 (1.8%)

Information
- Rite: Latin Rite

Current leadership
- Pope: Leo XIV
- Bishop: Paul Abel Mamba Diatta
- Bishops emeritus: Jean-Noël Diouf

The Roman Catholic Diocese of Tambacounda (Latin: Tambacundan(us), French: Diocèse catholique romain de Tambacounda) is a diocese located in the city of Tambacounda in the ecclesiastical province of Dakar in Senegal.

== History ==
- August 13, 1970: Established as Apostolic Prefecture of Tambacounda from the Diocese of Kaolack and Diocese of Saint-Louis du Sénégal
- April 17, 1989: Promoted as Diocese of Tambacounda

== Special churches ==
- The cathedral is Cathédrale Marie Reine de l’Univers in Tambacounda, which is located in the Medina Coura neighborhood of the town.

== Leadership ==
- Prefect Apostolic of Tambacounda (Roman rite)
  - Fr. Clément Cailleau, C.S.Sp. (1970.08.13 – 1986.04.24)
- Bishops of Tambacounda (Roman rite)
  - Bishop Jean-Noël Diouf (1989.04.17 – 2017.08.05)
  - Bishop Paul Abel Mamba Diatta (2021.11.04 – ...)

== See also ==
- Roman Catholicism in Senegal
