= Louis Le Hunsec =

Louis Le Hunsec C.S.Sp.
- Superior General of the Congregation of the Holy Spirit
- Church: Catholic Church
- In office: 26 July 1926 – 26 July 1950
- Predecessor: Alexandre Le Roy
- Successor: Marcel Lefebvre
- Other post: Titular Bishop of Marcianopolis (1945-1954)
- Previous posts: Titular Bishop of Europus (1920-1945); Prefect of Sénégal (1920-1926); Vicar Apostolic of Senegambia (1920-1926)

Orders
- Ordination: 21 September 1901
- Consecration: 30 May 1920 by Alexandre Le Roy

Personal details
- Born: 6 January 1878 Ploemeur, France
- Died: 25 December 1954 (aged 76) Paris, France

Louis Le Hunsec, C.S.Sp. (6 January 1878 – 25 December 1954) was a French missionary bishop who served as Superior General of the Congregation of the Holy Spirit from 1926 to 1950. He spent most of his earlier career as a missionary in Senegal from 1903 to 1919.

== Biography ==
Louis Le Hunsec was born in Ploemeur, Brittany, France, the son of Louis Pierre Le Hunsec et his wife Marie-Thérèse Le Gouhir, who were bakers. He attended the minor seminary of Sainte-Anne d'Auray. In October 1897 he joined the Congregation of the Holy Spirit in Orlu and then earned a diploma in philosophy and a licentiate in theology in Rome. He was ordained a priest on 21 September 1901 and took his final vows on 2 July 1902.

He taught philosophy in the seminary in Chevilly for a year and then received permission to work as a missionary in Senegal, where he worked until 1919. (Note: He spent April to November 1910 in France.) In his first assignment he tutored the children of Admiral Paul Albert de Gueydon, commandant of the French naval station in Senegal, for a year, which allowed him time to get his footing. He then spent five years as an active missionary among the Diolas in Casamance, the southern region of Senegal. After a sojourn of several months in France, he worked again in Dakar and Casamance before settling in Dakar where he worked as a curate, financial administrator, and eventually vicar general. On 4 September 1919, he was appointed councillor general of his order. He returned to Paris to head his order's community there and its colonial seminary.

On 23 April 1920, Pope Benedict XV appointed him titular bishop of Europus and Vicar Apostolic of Senegambia.

He received his episcopal consecration in Paris on 30 May 1920 from Bishop Alexandre-Louis-Victor-Aimé Le Roy, Superior General of the Holy Ghost Fathers, assisted by Raymond-René Lerouge, Vicar Apostolic of French Guinea, who had just been ordained a bishop on 25 May 1920, and Father Alfred Louis Keiling, Prefect Apostolic of Upper Cimbebasia. At the time, a priest could participate as a co-consecrator in cases of necessity. On 26 June 1920, Le Hunsec was given the additional responsibilities of the Prefect Apostolic of Senegal. (Note: Le Hunsec's work as Prefect and Vicar is detailed in Benoist, pp. 323–40.)

On 26 July 1926, he was elected to a twelve-year term as superior general of the Holy Ghost Fathers and he resigned his other positions. He was elected to a second term in 1938.

On 24 February 1945, in recognition of his 25 years as a bishop, he was named titular archbishop of Marcianopolis.

He resigned as superior general in July 1950. In retirement he continued to live in the motherhouse of the Holy Ghost Fathers in Paris and he died there on 25 December 1954 at the age of 76.

== See also ==
- Roman Catholicism in Senegal

Catholic Church titles
Preceded by Tranquillo Guarneri	Titular Bishop of Europus; 30 May 1920 – 24 February 1945	Succeeded by Franciscus Gerard Constantin Kramer
Preceded by Alexandre Le Roy	Superior General of the Congregation of the Holy Spirit; 26 July 1926 – 26 July 1950	Succeeded by Francis Griffin
Preceded by Giuseppe di Girolamo	Titular Archbishop of Marcoanopolis; 24 February 1945 – 25 December 1954	Succeeded by Giovanni Sismondo
