= Clément Cailleau =

Clément Cailleau C.S.Sp.
- Prefect of Tambacounda
- Church: Catholic Church
- See: Apostolic Prefecture of Tambacounda
- In office: 13 August 1970 – 24 April 1986
- Predecessor: Prefecture erected
- Successor: Jean-Noël Diouf

Orders
- Ordination: 1 October 1950

Personal details
- Born: 27 July 1923 Nueil-sur-Layon, Maine-et-Loire, France
- Died: 21 July 2011 (aged 87)

Clément Cailleau C.S.Sp. (27 July 1923 – 21 July 2011) was a French-born prelate. Cailleau served as the prefect of what is now the Roman Catholic Diocese of Tambacounda in Senegal from 13 August 1970 until 24 April 1986. Tambacounda was elevated to a full Catholic diocese in 1989.

Cailleau was born in Nueil-sur-Layon, France, on 27 July 1923. He was ordained a Catholic priest of the Holy Ghost Fathers on 1 October 1950. He died as the prefect emeritus of Tambacounda on 21 July 2011, at the age of 87.
