= Santa Lucia a Piazza d'Armi =

St. Lucia at Piazza D‘Armi
- Santa Lucia a Piazza d‘Armi (in Italian); S. Luciæ ad locum vulgo Piazza d‘Armi (in Latin)
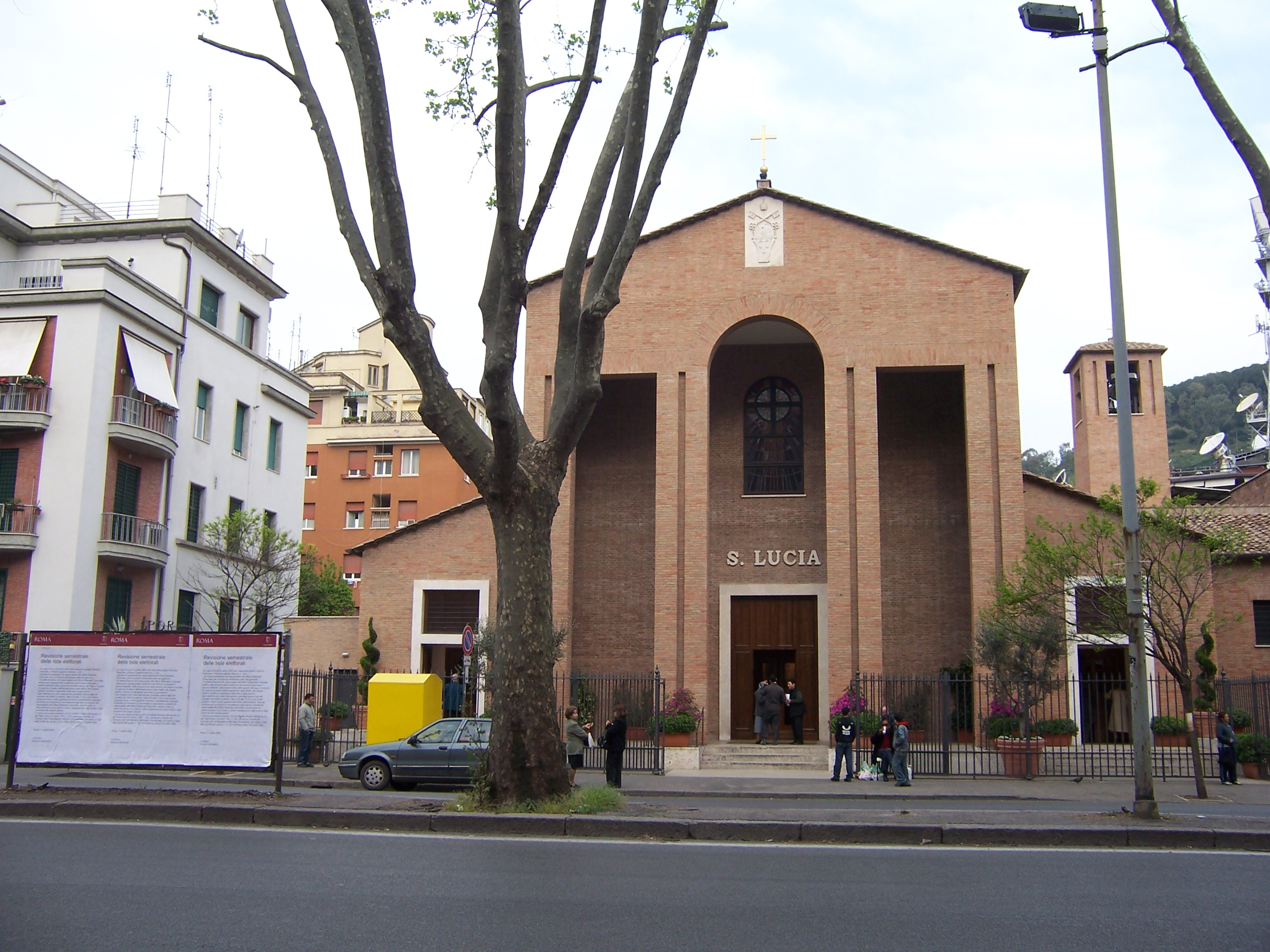
- Facade
- Click on the map for a fullscreen view
- 41°55′10″N 12°27′24″E
- Location: Via di Santa Lucia 5, Rome
- Country: Italy
- Denomination: Roman Catholic
- Tradition: Roman Rite
- Website: Official website

History
- Status: Titular church
- Dedication: Saint Lucy

Architecture
- Architect: Tullio Rossi
- Architectural type: Church
- Style: Modernist
- Completed: 1938

Administration
- District: Lazio
- Province: Rome

The church of Saint Lucia is a place of Catholic worship in Rome, seat of the parish belonging to the diocese of Rome and, since 1973 the cardinal's title of "Saint Lucia at the Yard."

The building is located in the stretch of the ring road Clodia between Piazzale Clodius and Marshal Square Garden, in Della Vittoria district falling within the boundaries of the Municipality of Rome I.

== List of Cardinal Protectors ==
- Timothy Manning 5 March 1973 - 23 June 1989
- Frédéric Etsou-Nzabi-Bamungwabi 28 June 1991 - 6 January 2007
- Theodore Adrien Sarr 24 November 2007 - present
