= Pierre Sagna (bishop) =

Senegalese Roman Catholic bishop

Pierre Sagna C.S.Sp.
- Bishop of Saint-Louis du Sénégal
- Church: Catholic Church
- Diocese: Diocese of Saint-Louis du Sénégal
- In office: 19 December 1974 – 22 February 2003
- Predecessor: Prosper Dodds
- Successor: Ernest Sambou

Orders
- Ordination: 4 October 1959 by Pierre Brot
- Consecration: 11 May 1975 by Augustin Sagna

Personal details
- Born: 11 July 1932 Ziguinchor, Colony of Sénégal, French West Africa, French Empire
- Died: 24 May 2008 (aged 75)

Pierre Sagna (11 July 1932 − 24 May 2008) was a Senegalese Roman Catholic bishop.

Ordained to the priesthood in 1959, Sagna was named bishop of Roman Catholic Diocese of Saint-Louis du Sénégal, Senegal in 1974 and resigned in 2003.
