= La Moutade =

- Part of Chambaron-sur-Morge
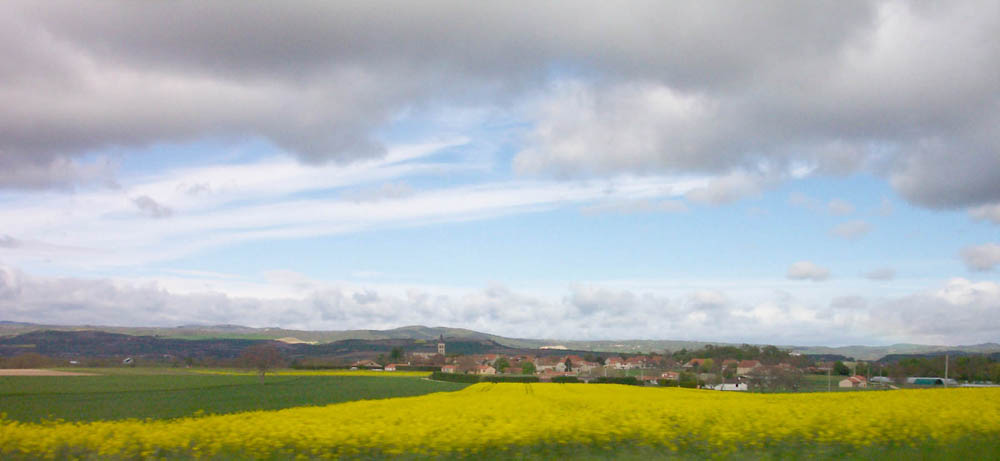

- Coat of arms
- Location of La Moutade
- Location within France Location within Auvergne-Rhône-Alpes
- Coordinates: 45°58′05″N 3°09′40″E
- Country: France
- Region: Auvergne-Rhône-Alpes
- Department: Puy-de-Dôme
- Arrondissement: Riom
- Canton: Riom
- Commune: Chambaron-sur-Morge
- Area^{1}: 5.31 km^{2} (2.05 sq mi)
- Elevation: 335 m (1,099 ft)
- Highest elevation: 356 m (1,168 ft)
- Lowest elevation: 323 m (1,060 ft)
- Population (2019): 536
  - Density: 101/km^{2} (261/sq mi)
- Time zone: UTC+01:00 (CET)
  - Summer (DST): UTC+02:00 (CEST)
- Postal code: 63200
- ^{1} French Land Register data, which excludes lakes, ponds, glaciers > 1 km^{2} (0.386 sq mi or 247 acres) and river estuaries.

La Moutade (French pronunciation: [la mutad]; Auvergnat: La Motada) is a former commune in the Puy-de-Dôme department in Auvergne in central France. On 1 January 2016, it was merged into the new commune of Chambaron-sur-Morge.

== See also ==
- Communes of the Puy-de-Dôme department
