= Maixent Coly =

- Bishop of Ziguinchor
- Church: Catholic Church
- Diocese: Diocese of Ziguinchor
- In office: 23 October 1995 – 24 August 2010
- Predecessor: Augustin Sagna
- Successor: Paul Abel Mamba Diatta
- Previous post: Coadjutor Bishop of Ziguinchor (1993-1995)

Orders
- Ordination: 30 December 1980
- Consecration: 11 December 1993 by Augustin Sagna

Personal details
- Born: 10 September 1949 Affiniam, Senegal Territory, French West Africa, French Empire
- Died: 24 August 2010 (aged 60)

Maixent Coly (September 10, 1949 – August 24, 2010) was the Roman Catholic bishop of the Roman Catholic Diocese of Ziguinchor, Senegal.

Born in Affiniam, Coly was ordained to the priesthood on December 30, 1980. He was appointed coadjutor bishop of the Ziguinchor Diocese by Pope John Paul II on April 11, 1993 and was consecrated on December 11, 1993 succeeding on October 23, 1995. Bishop Coly died in office in 2010, aged 60, from undisclosed causes.
