= Cellule =

- Part of Chambaron-sur-Morge
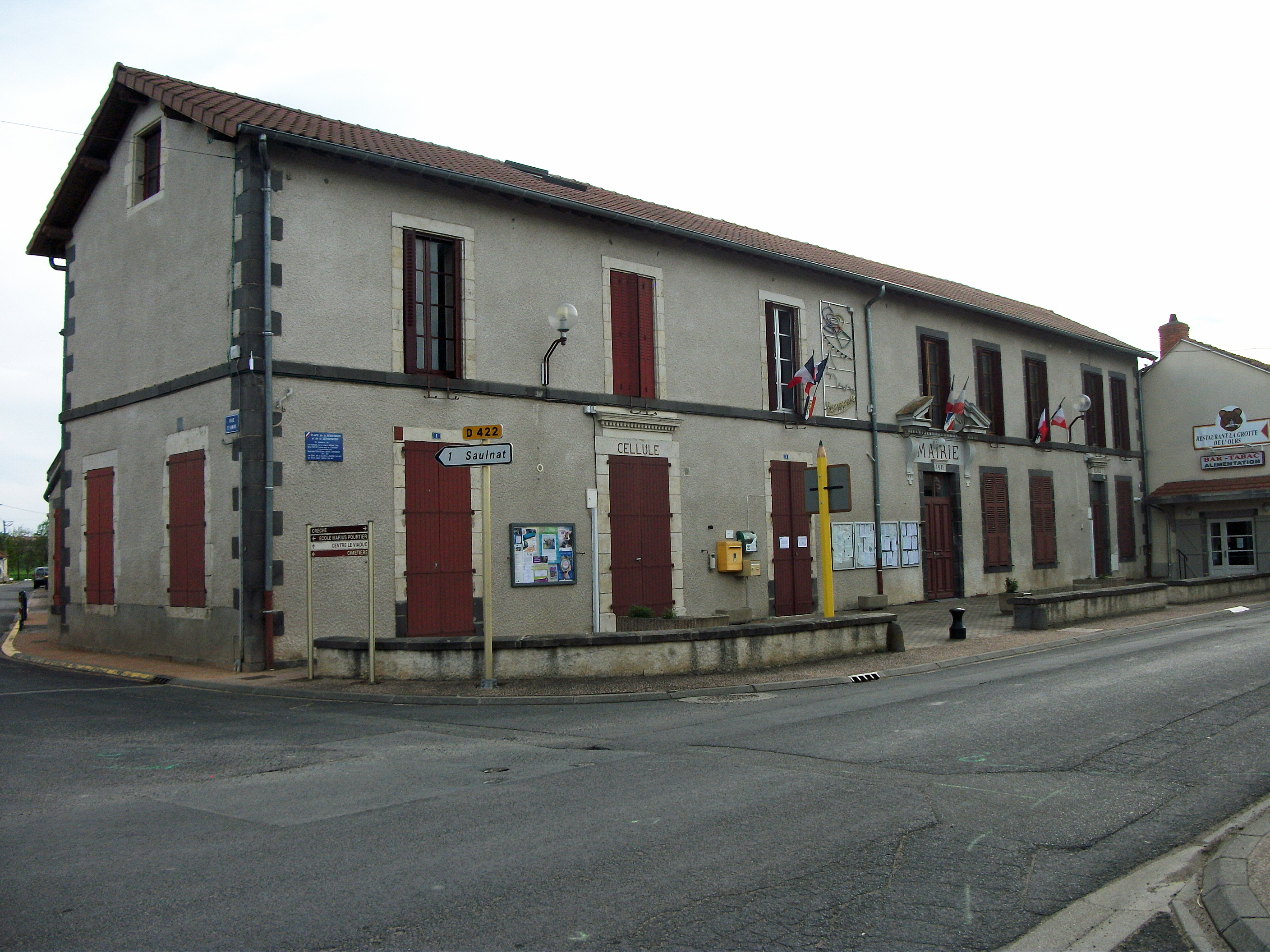
- Town hall
- Location of Cellule
- Location within France Location within Auvergne-Rhône-Alpes
- Coordinates: 45°56′53″N 3°08′23″E
- Country: France
- Region: Auvergne-Rhône-Alpes
- Department: Puy-de-Dôme
- Arrondissement: Riom
- Canton: Riom
- Commune: Chambaron-sur-Morge
- Area^{1}: 8.74 km^{2} (3.37 sq mi)
- Elevation: 330 m (1,080 ft)
- Highest elevation: 364 m (1,194 ft)
- Lowest elevation: 310 m (1,020 ft)
- Population (2019): 1,250
  - Density: 143/km^{2} (370/sq mi)
- Time zone: UTC+01:00 (CET)
  - Summer (DST): UTC+02:00 (CEST)
- Postal code: 63200
- ^{1} French Land Register data, which excludes lakes, ponds, glaciers > 1 km^{2} (0.386 sq mi or 247 acres) and river estuaries.

Cellule (Auvergnat: La Cellaula) is a former commune in the Puy-de-Dôme department in Auvergne in central France. On 1 January 2016, it was merged into the new commune of Chambaron-sur-Morge.

== See also ==
- Communes of the Puy-de-Dôme department
