= Diocese of Kolda =

Roman Catholic diocese in Senegal

Coordinates: 12.8914°N 14.9371°W

Diocese of Kolda Dioecesis Koldaensis
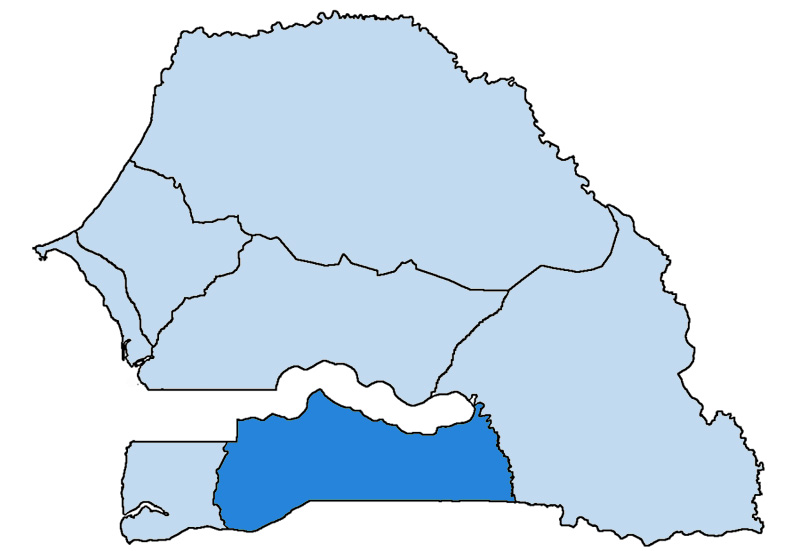
- Map of the Diocese of Kolda

Location
- Country: Senegal
- Metropolitan: Dakar

Statistics
- Area: 21,011 km^{2} (8,112 sq mi)
- Population: Total; Catholics: (as of 2004); 833,760; 36,840 (4.4%)

Information
- Rite: Latin Rite

Current leadership
- Pope: Leo XIV
- Bishop: Jean-Pierre Bassène

The Roman Catholic Diocese of Kolda (Latin: Koldaën(sis), French: Diocèse catholique romain de Kolda) is a diocese located in the city of Kolda in the ecclesiastical province of Dakar in Senegal.

== History ==
- December 22, 1999: Established as Diocese of Kolda from Diocese of Ziguinchor

== Special churches ==
- The cathedral is Cathédrale Notre Dame des Victoires in Kolda.

== Leadership ==
- Bishops of Kolda (Roman rite)
  - Bishop Jean-Pierre Bassène (since December 22, 1999)

== See also ==
- Roman Catholicism in Senegal
