= Diocese of Kaolack =

Roman Catholic diocese in Senegal

Coordinates: 14.1384°N 16.0743°W

Diocese of Kaolack Dioecesis Kaolackensis
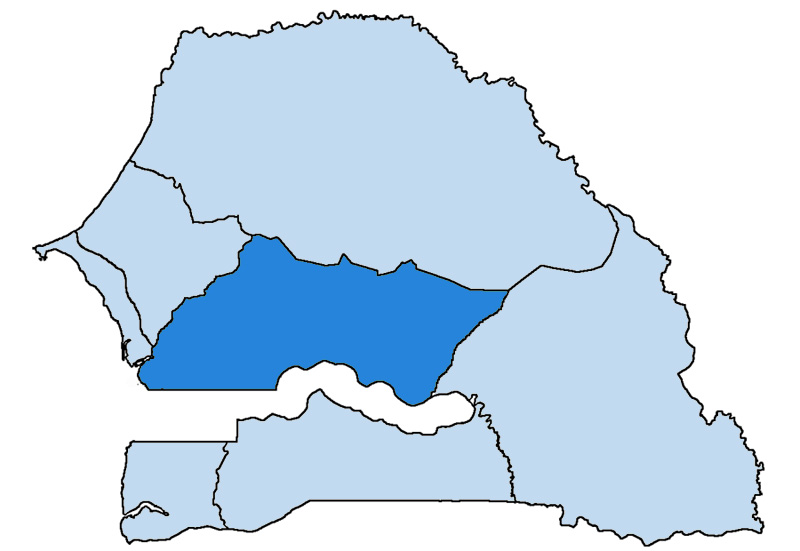
- Map of the Diocese of Kaolack

Location
- Country: Senegal
- Metropolitan: Dakar

Statistics
- Area: 21,299 km^{2} (8,224 sq mi)
- Population: Total; Catholics: (as of 2004); 1,741,000; 14,450 (0.8%)

Information
- Rite: Latin Rite

Current leadership
- Pope: Leo XIV
- Bishop: Martin Boucar Tine, S.S.S.

The Roman Catholic Diocese of Kaolack (Latin: Kaolacken(sis), French: Diocèse catholique romain de Kaolack) is a diocese located in the city of Kaolack in the ecclesiastical province of Dakar in Senegal.

== History ==
- February 21, 1957: Established as Apostolic Prefecture of Kaolack from the Metropolitan Archdiocese of Dakar and Diocese of Ziguinchor
- July 6, 1965: Promoted as Diocese of Kaolack

== Special churches ==
- The cathedral is Cathédrale Saint-Théophile in Kaolack.

== Leadership ==
- Prefect Apostolic of Kaolack (Roman rite)
  - Fr. Théophile Albert Cadoux, M.S.C. (1957.03.29 – 1965.07.06 see below)
- Bishops of Kaolack (Roman rite)
  - Théophile Albert Cadoux, M.S.C. (see above 1965.07.06 – 1974.07.01)
  - Théodore-Adrien Sarr (1974.07.01 – 2000.06.02), appointed Archbishop of Dakar (Cardinal in 2007)
  - Benjamin Ndiaye (2001.06.15 - 2014.12.22), appointed Archbishop of Dakar
  - Martin Boucar Tine, S.S.S. (2018.07.25 –)

== See also ==
- Roman Catholicism in Senegal

== Sources ==
- GCatholic.org
- Catholic Hierarchy ^{[self-published]}
