= Saint-Senier-de-Beuvron =

- Commune
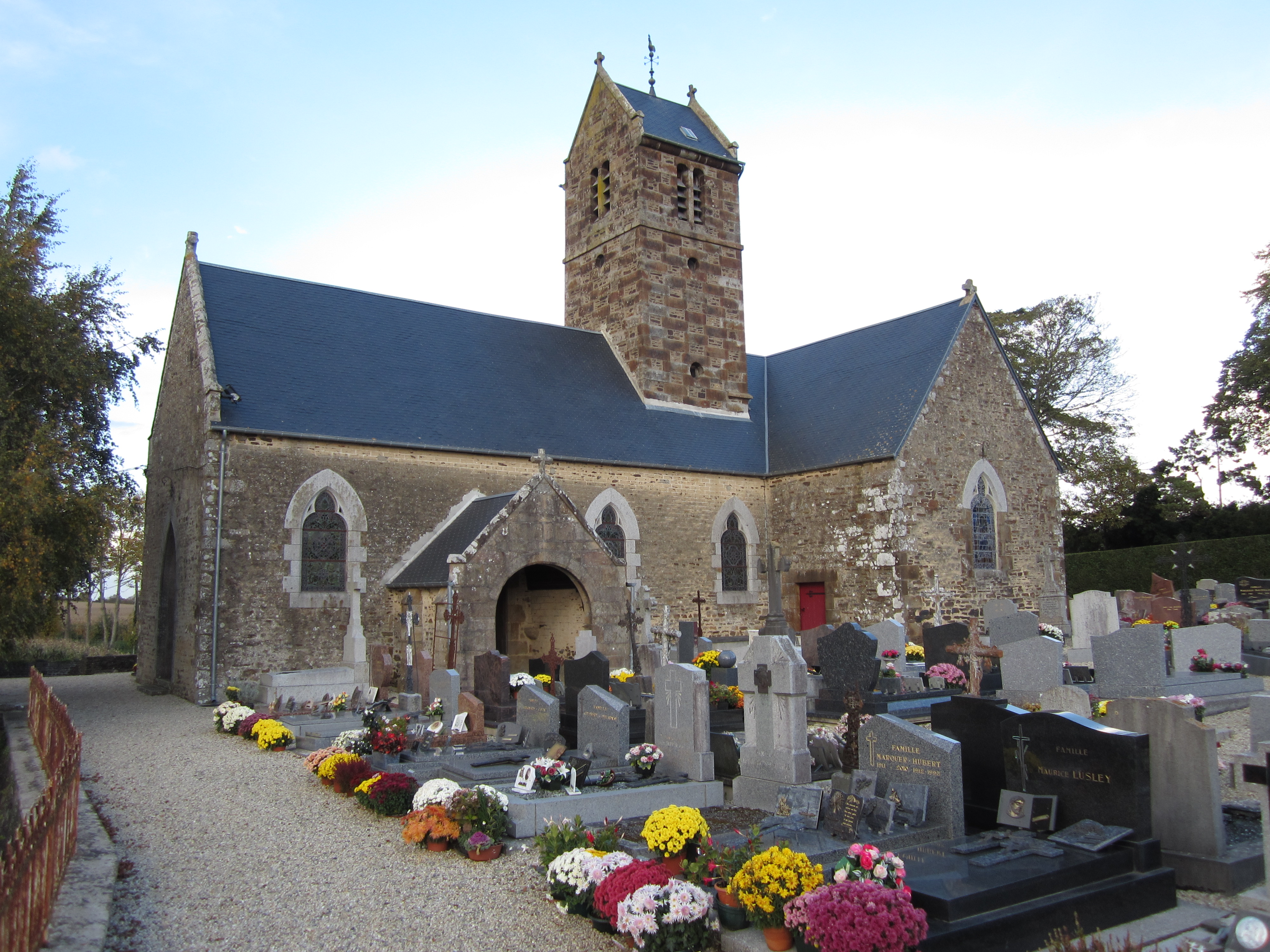
- The church of Saint-Senier
- Location of Saint-Senier-de-Beuvron
- Location within France Location within Normandy
- Coordinates: 48°34′35″N 1°18′33″W
- Country: France
- Region: Normandy
- Department: Manche
- Arrondissement: Avranches
- Canton: Saint-Hilaire-du-Harcouët
- Intercommunality: CA Mont-Saint-Michel-Normandie

Government
  - Mayor (2020–2026): Benoît Hamard
- Area^{1}: 11.21 km^{2} (4.33 sq mi)
- Elevation: 41 m (135 ft)
- Highest elevation: 170 m (560 ft)
- Lowest elevation: 17 m (56 ft)
- Population (2023): 324
  - Density: 28.9/km^{2} (74.9/sq mi)
- Time zone: UTC+01:00 (CET)
  - Summer (DST): UTC+02:00 (CEST)
- INSEE/Postal code: 50553 /50240
- ^{1} French Land Register data, which excludes lakes, ponds, glaciers > 1 km^{2} (0.386 sq mi or 247 acres) and river estuaries.

Saint-Senier-de-Beuvron is a commune in the Manche department in Normandy in north-western France.

== See also ==
- Communes of the Manche department
