= André Guèye =

Senegalese Roman Catholic prelate (born 1967)

The Most Reverend André Guèye
- Archbishop of Dakar, Senegal
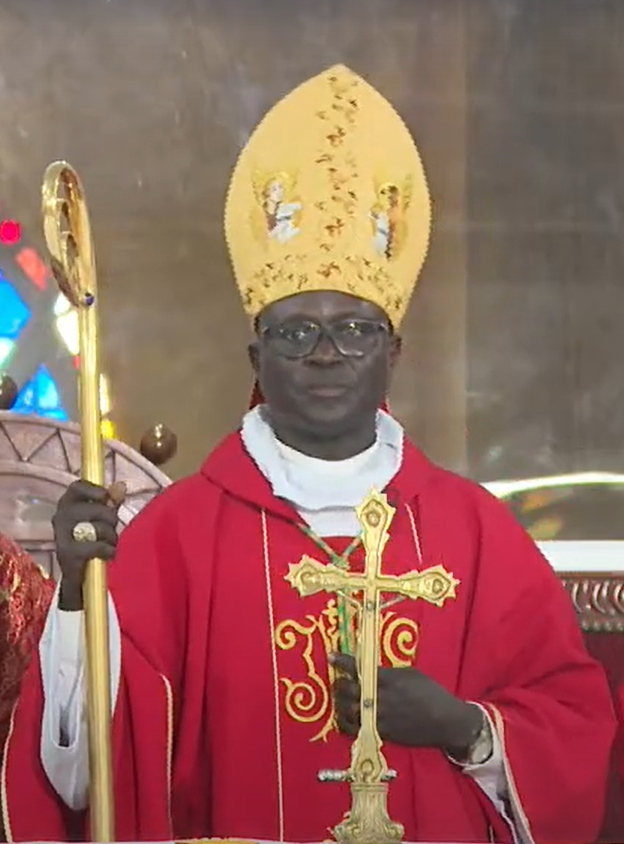
- Church: Catholic Church
- Archdiocese: Roman Catholic Archdiocese of Dakar
- See: Dakar
- Appointed: 22 February 2025
- Installed: 3 May 2025
- Predecessor: Benjamin Ndiaye
- Successor: Incumbent
- Other posts: Bishop of the Roman Catholic Diocese of Thiès (18 January 2013 - 22 February 2025); Apostolic Administrator of the Roman Catholic Diocese of Saint-Louis du Sénégal (since 12 January 2023)

Orders
- Ordination: 27 June 1992
- Consecration: 25 May 2013 by Théodore-Adrien Sarr
- Rank: Archbishop

Personal details
- Born: André Guèye; 6 January 1967 (age 59) Pallo-Younga, Mont-Rolland Commune, Thiès Region, Senegal
- Motto: "In him life and light"

Styles of André Guèye
- Reference style: Your Lordship; The Most Reverend
- Spoken style: His Lordship
- Religious style: Bishop

André Guèye (born 6 January 1967) is a Senegalese Catholic prelate who was appointed as the 5th Archbishop of the Roman Catholic Archdiocese of Dakar, Senegal on 22 February 2025. Before that, from 18 January 2013 until 22 February 2025, he was the Bishop of the Roman Catholic Diocese of Thiès, Senegal. He serves as the Apostolic Administrator of the Roman Catholic Diocese of Saint-Louis du Sénégal since 12 January 2023. He was appointed bishop on 18 January 2013 by Pope Benedict XVI and was consecrated at Thiès on 25 May 2013. His installation as Archbishop of Dakar took place on 3 May 2025.

== Background and education ==
He was born on 6 January 1967, at Pallo-Younga, a village in the commune of Mont-Rolland, in the Thiès Region, Senegal. He studied philosophy at Sébikotane Major Seminary, about 45 kilometres (28 mi), east of Dakar, the country's capital city. He studied also at the seminary at Brin, in Ziguinchor Region in the southwest of the country. He then studied Theology at the Pontifical Urban University in Rome, Italy. He was ordained a priest of the Diocese of Thiès, Senegal on 27 June 1992.

== Priesthood ==
On 14 December 1991, he was ordained a deacon. He was ordained a priest of the Diocese of Thiès, Senegal on 27 June 1992. He served in that capacity until 18 January 2013.

== As bishop ==
On 18 January 2013, Pope Benedict XVI appointed him as Bishop of the Roman Catholic Diocese of Thiès, Senegal. He was consecrated and installed at Thiès, Senegal on 25 May 2013 by the hands of Cardinal Théodore-Adrien Sarr, Archbishop of Dakar assisted by Bishop Benjamin Ndiaye, Bishop of Kaolack and Archbishop Ludwig Schick, Archbishop of Bamberg. On 12 January 2023 The Holy Father Pope Francis appointed him Apostolic Administrator of the Diocese of Saint-Louis du Sénégal, in the extreme north of the country.

Pope Francis appointed him Archbishop of the Metropolitan Province of Dakar on 22 February 2025. His was installed there as planned on 3 May 2025.

== See also ==
- Catholic Church in Senegal

== Succession table ==
Catholic Church titles
Preceded by Jacques Yandé Sarr (17 October 1986 - 18 January 2011)	Bishop of Thiès (18 January 2013 - 22 February 2025)	Succeeded by Vacant
Preceded by Benjamin Ndiaye (22 December 2014 - 22 February 2025)	Archbishop of Dakar (since 22 February 2025)	Succeeded by Incumbent
