= Théodore-Adrien Sarr =

Senegalese Catholic cardinal

His Eminence Théodore-Adrien Sarr
- Cardinal, Archbishop emeritus of Dakar
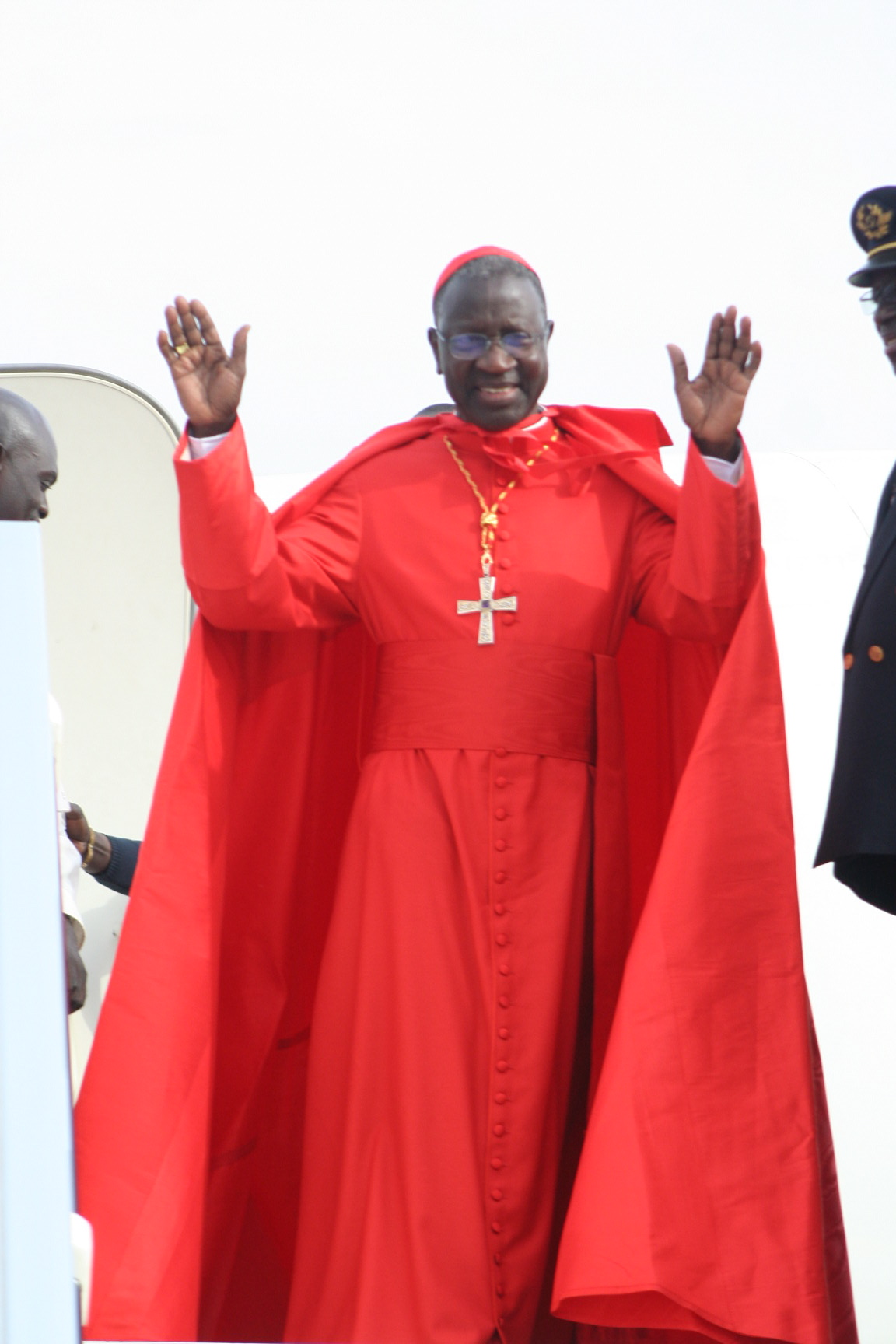
- Cardinal Théodore Adrien Sarr in 2008
- Church: Catholic Church
- Archdiocese: Dakar
- Appointed: 2 June 2000
- Term ended: 22 December 2014
- Predecessor: Hyacinthe Thiandoum
- Successor: Benjamin Ndiaye
- Other post: Cardinal-Priest of Santa Lucia a Piazza d’Armi
- Previous post: Bishop of Kaolack (1974–2000)

Orders
- Ordination: 28 May 1964 by Hyacinthe Thiandoum
- Consecration: 24 November 1974 by Hyacinthe Thiandoum
- Created cardinal: 24 November 2007 by Benedict XVI
- Rank: Cardinal-Priest

Personal details
- Born: 28 November 1936 (age 89) Fadiouth, Senegal
- Denomination: Roman Catholic
- Motto: "Domine ad quem ibimus" (Lord, to whom shall we go?)
- Coat of arms

Styles of Théodore-Adrien Sarr
- Reference style: His Eminence
- Spoken style: Your Eminence
- Informal style: Cardinal
- See: Dakar (Emeritus)

Théodore-Adrien Sarr (born 28 November 1936) is a Senegalese cardinal of the Catholic Church. He served as Archbishop of Dakar from 2000 to 2014, and before that as Bishop of Kaolack from 1974 to 2000. He was elevated to the cardinalate in 2007 by Pope Benedict XVI.

== Biography ==
=== Early life and ordination ===
Théodore-Adrien Sarr was born in Fadiouth to Rôg (baptised Edouard or Roger) and Louise (maiden name : Louise Diakher Diouf) Sarr, as one of seven children (including two sons and four daughters). He was born to a Serer family and has many family members in Gambia. He completed his secondary studies at the minor seminary in Hann, where he received a baccalaureate. Sarr then studied philosophy and theology at the Major Seminary of Sébikhotane and the University of Dakar.

He was ordained to the priesthood by Archbishop Hyacinthe Thiandoum on 28 May 1964, and furthered his studies at the University of Dakar, from where he obtained his licentiate in the classical languages of Latin and Greek.

=== Pastoral work ===
Sarr then did pastoral work at the parish of Saint-Thérèse in Dakar, as assistant to the groups of Catholic Action. He also served as a professor at the Minor Seminary of N'Gasobil, later as its superior from 1970 to 1974.

=== Bishop ===
On 1 July 1974, Sarr was appointed the second Bishop of Kaolack by Pope Paul VI. He received his episcopal consecration on the following 24 November from Archbishop Thiandoum, with Bishops Théophile Cadoux, MSC, and Augustin Sagna serving as co-consecrators, in an open-air ceremony at the grand square of Collège Pie XII in Kaolack. Bishop Sarr was later named the third Archbishop of Dakar on 2 June 2000.

In addition to his duties as archbishop, he also serves as president of the Episcopal Conference of Senegal, Mauritania, Cape Verde, and Guinea-Bissau, and the first vice-president of the Symposium of Episcopal Conferences of Africa and Madagascar.

=== Cardinal ===
Pope Benedict XVI created him Cardinal-Priest of Santa Lucia a Piazza d'Armi in the consistory of 24 November 2007. On 17 January 2009 he was appointed a member of the Pontifical Council for Culture by Pope Benedict.

Cardinal Sarr was one of the cardinal electors who participated in the 2013 papal conclave that selected Pope Francis. However, he is no longer eligible to participate in any future papal conclaves as he reached the age of eighty on 28 November 2016.

== Views ==
=== Abortion ===
Sarr discourages abortion, noting that the synod fathers affirmed that life must be respected from beginning to its natural end. He further stated that pastoral ministers in Africa must seek to help women with unwanted pregnancies, and that there are ways to deal with a difficult pregnancy other than abortion.

=== HIV/AIDS and condoms ===
In 2009, Cardinal Sarr defended the Pope over a controversy surrounding the latter's refusal to approve any sort of condom use in the fight against AIDS.

Catholic Church titles
Preceded by Théophile Cadoux	Bishop of Kaolack; 1 July 1974 – 2 June 2000	Succeeded by Benjamin Ndiaye
Preceded by Hyacinthe Thiandoum	Archbishop of Dakar; 2 June 2000 – 22 December 2014	Succeeded by Benjamin Ndiaye
Preceded by Frédéric Etsou-Nzabi-Bamungwabi	Cardinal-Priest of Santa Lucia a Piazza d'Armi; 24 November 2007 –	Incumbent
