= Diocese of Saint-Louis du Sénégal =

Roman Catholic diocese in Senegal

Coordinates: 16.0248°N 16.5044°W

Diocese of Saint-Louis du Sénégal Dioecesis Sancti Ludovici Senegalensis
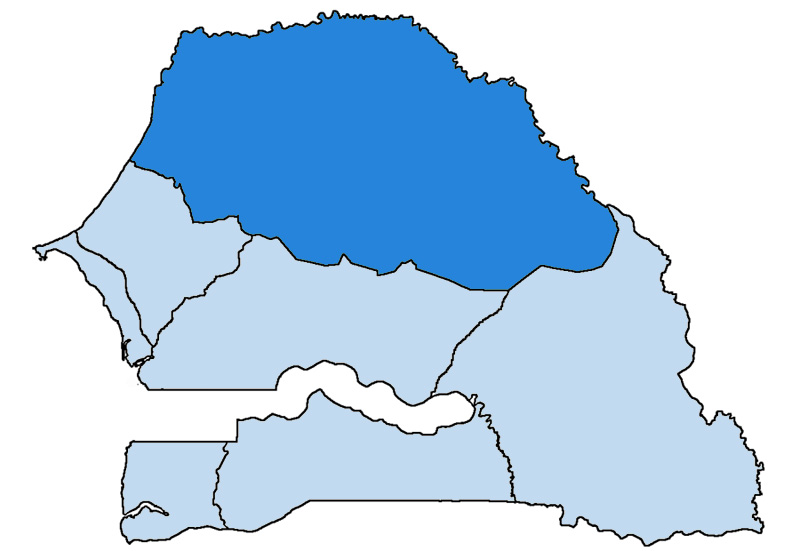
- Map of the Diocese of Saint-Louis du Sénégal

Location
- Country: Senegal
- Metropolitan: Dakar

Statistics
- Area: 73,315 km^{2} (28,307 sq mi)
- Population: Total; Catholics: (as of 2004); 1,578,853; 4,850 (0.3%)

Information
- Rite: Latin Rite

Current leadership
- Pope: Leo XIV
- Bishop: Augustin Simmel Ndiaye (Bishop-Elect)
- Apostolic Administrator: André Guèye
- Bishops emeritus: Ernest Sambou

The Roman Catholic Diocese of Saint-Louis du Sénégal (Latin: Sancti Ludovici Senegalen(sis), French: Diocèse catholique romain de Saint-Louis du Sénégal) is a diocese located in the city of Saint-Louis in the ecclesiastical province of Dakar in Senegal.

== History ==
- 1763: Established as Apostolic Prefecture of Sénégal from the Diocese of Funchal in Portugal
- January 27, 1936: Renamed as Apostolic Prefecture of Saint-Louis du Sénégal
- February 15, 1966: Promoted as Diocese of Saint-Louis du Sénégal

== Special churches ==
- The cathedral is Cathédrale Saint Louis.

== Leadership ==
- Prefects Apostolic of Sénégal (Roman rite)
  - Fr. Jean-Claude Duret, C.S.Sp. (1856 – 1873.08.22), appointed Vicar Apostolic of Senegambia and Titular Bishop of Antigonea
  - Bishop François-Marie Duboin, C.S.Sp. (1876.07.20 – 1883.07)
  - Bishop François-Xavier Riehl (1883.11.23 – 1886.07.23)
  - Bishop Mathurin Picarda (1887.07.14 – 1889.01.22)
  - Bishop Joachim-Pierre Buléon, C.S.Sp. (1899.06.06 – 1900.06.13)
  - Bishop François-Nicolas-Alphonse Kunemann, C.S.Sp. (1901.02.27 – 1908.03.20)
  - Bishop Hyacinthe-Joseph Jalabert, C.S.Sp. (1909.02.13 – 1920.01.12)
  - Bishop Louis Le Hunsec, C.S.Sp. (1920.06.26 – 1926.07.26), appointed Superior General of Congregation of the Holy Spirit; future Archbishop
- Prefect Apostolic of Saint-Louis du Sénégal (Roman rite)
  - Fr. Joseph Landreau, C.S.Sp. (1955 – 1965)
- Bishops of Saint-Louis du Sénégal (Roman rite)
  - Bishop Prosper Dodds, C.S.Sp. (1966.02.15 – 1973.01.12)
  - Bishop Pierre Sagna, C.S.Sp. (1974.12.19 – 2003.02.22)
  - Bishop Ernest Sambou (22 February 2003 - 12 January 2023)
  - Bishop-Elect Augustin Simmel Ndiaye (since 2 April 2025)

== See also ==
- Roman Catholicism in Senegal
- Timeline of Saint-Louis, Senegal

== Sources ==
- GCatholic.org
- Catholic Hierarchy
