= Hyacinthe Thiandoum =

His Eminence Hyacinthe Thiandoum
- Archbishop Emeritus of Dakar
- Church: Roman Catholic Church
- Archdiocese: Dakar
- See: Dakar
- Appointed: 24 February 1962
- Term ended: 2 June 2000
- Predecessor: Marcel Lefebvre
- Successor: Théodore-Adrien Sarr
- Other post: Cardinal-Priest of Santa Maria del Popolo (1976-2004)
- Previous posts: President of the Conference of Bishops of Senegal, Mauritania, Cape Verde, and Guinea-Bissau (1970-87); President of the Symposium of Episcopal Conferences of Africa and Madagascar (1979-81)

Orders
- Ordination: 18 April 1949 by Marcel Lefebvre
- Consecration: 20 May 1962 by Jean Émile André Marie Maury
- Created cardinal: 24 May 1976 by Pope Paul VI
- Rank: Cardinal-Priest

Personal details
- Born: Hyacinthe Thiandoum; 2 February 1921 Poponguine, Senegal
- Died: 18 May 2004 (aged 83) Saint Thomas de Villeneuve hospital, Aix-en-Provence, France
- Buried: Dakar Cathedral
- Parents: François Ndiémé; Anna Ndiémé Sène
- Education: Pontifical Gregorian University
- Motto: In verbo Tuo laxabo rete
- Coat of arms

Hyacinthe Thiandoum (2 February 1921 – 18 May 2004) was the first native Archbishop of Dakar (Senegal) and who was elevated to the cardinalate in mid-1976 by Pope Paul VI.

Born 1921 in Poponguine, Senegal, his father was a catechist. After finishing his secondary studies, he entered the regional seminary of Dakar and was ordained a priest on 18 April 1949, did parish work for two years and then went to Rome for further study at the Pontifical Gregorian University. He returned to Senegal in 1953 and, after working as a chaplain to Catholic action groups, became parish priest of the Dakar cathedral in 1960 and Vicar General the following year.

On 20 May 1962 he was consecrated as Archbishop of Dakar by Archbishop Marcel Lefebvre, his predecessor in the see. He was made a Cardinal-Priest by Paul VI in the Consistory of 24 May 1976, receiving the titular church of Santa Maria del Popolo.

Until 1987, he was president of the Bishops’ Conference of Senegal-Mauritania, and an elected member of the Council of the World Synod of Bishops. He has been the President of CEPACS (the Pan-African Episcopal Commission for Social Communications). He also took part in Vatican Council II.

Has been a member of the Council of the General Secretariat of the Synod of Bishops; President Delegate of the 4th General Assembly of the Synod of Bishops (1977); Relator of the 7th General Assembly of the Synod of Bishops (1987); and, General Relator of the Special Assembly for Africa of the Synod of Bishops (1994).

Cardinal Thiandoum died in 2004 at the age of 82.
