= Augustin Sagna =

Senegalese Roman Catholic prelate

- Bishop of Diocese of Ziguinchor Emeritus
- Church: Roman Catholic Church
- See: Diocese of Ziguinchor
- In office: 1966 - 1995
- Predecessor: Prosper Dodds
- Successor: Maixent Coly

Orders
- Ordination: 17 March 1950

Personal details
- Born: 23 October 1920 Ziguinchor, Senegal
- Died: 12 December 2012 (aged 92)

Augustin Sagna (23 October 1920 – 12 December 2012) was a Senegalese prelate of the Roman Catholic Church.

Sagna was born in Ziguinchor, Senegal and ordained a priest on 17 March 1950, for the Diocese of Ziguinchor. Sagna was appointed bishop of the Diocese of Ziguinchor on 29 September 1966, and consecrated on 15 January 1967. Sagna served the Diocese of Ziguinchor until his retirement on his 75th birthday.
