= Archdiocese of Dakar =

Roman Catholic archdiocese in Senegal

Coordinates: 14.6928°N 17.4467°W

Archdiocese of Dakar Archidioecesis Dakarensis Archidiocèse de Dakar
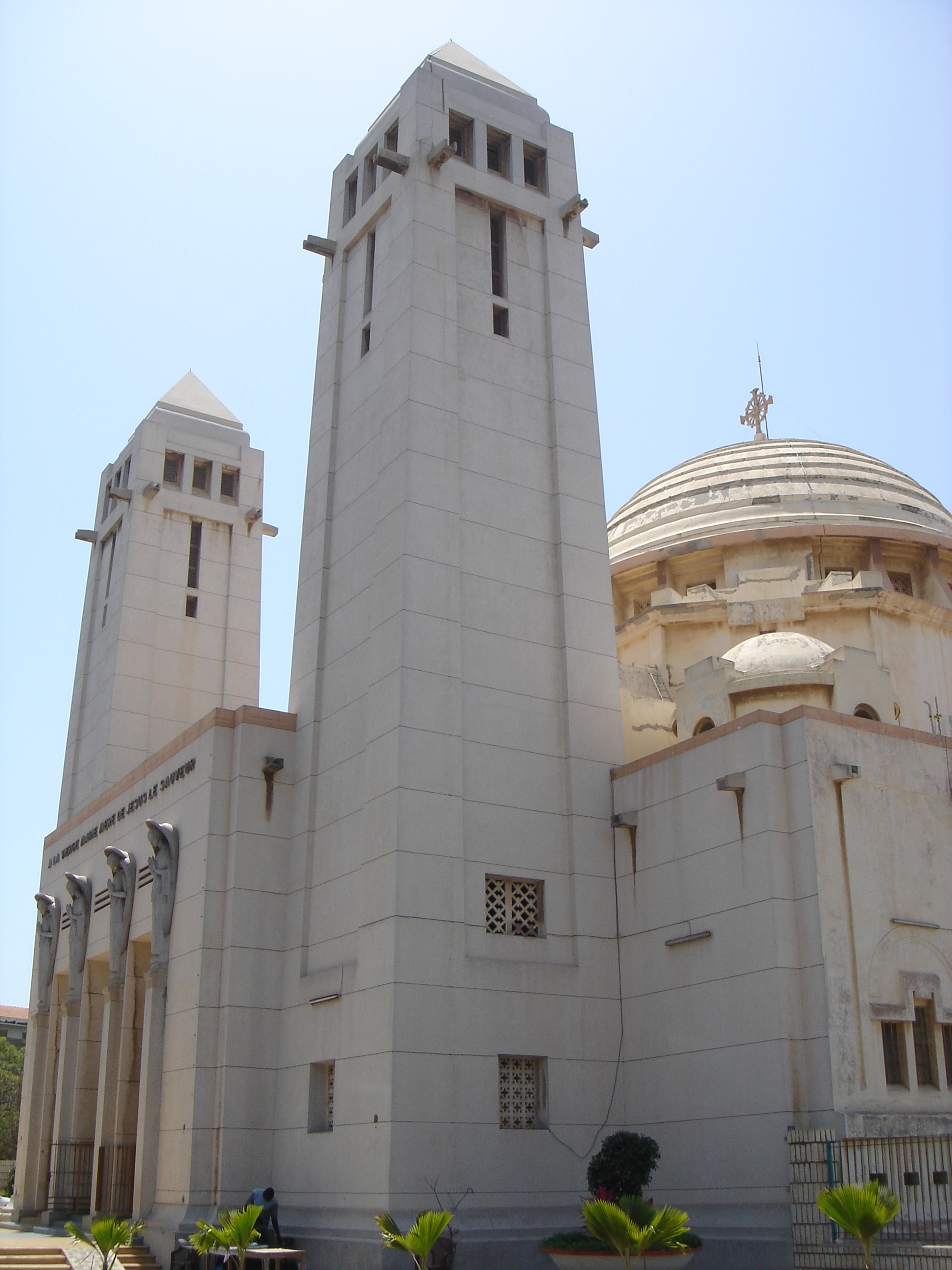
- Cathédrale Notre Dame des Victoires, the seat of the archbishop

Location
- Country: Senegal
- Headquarters: Dakar

Statistics
- Area: 4,803 km^{2} (1,854 sq mi)
- Population: Total; Catholics: (as of 2023); 5,093,320; 538,940 (10.6%)
- Parishes: 62

Information
- Denomination: Catholic Church
- Sui iuris church: Latin Church
- Rite: Roman Rite
- Established: 6 February 1863
- Cathedral: Our Lady of Victories Cathedral, Dakar

Current leadership
- Pope: Leo XIV
- Metropolitan Archbishop: André Guèye
- Bishops emeritus: Benjamin Ndiaye; Théodore-Adrien Sarr

Map
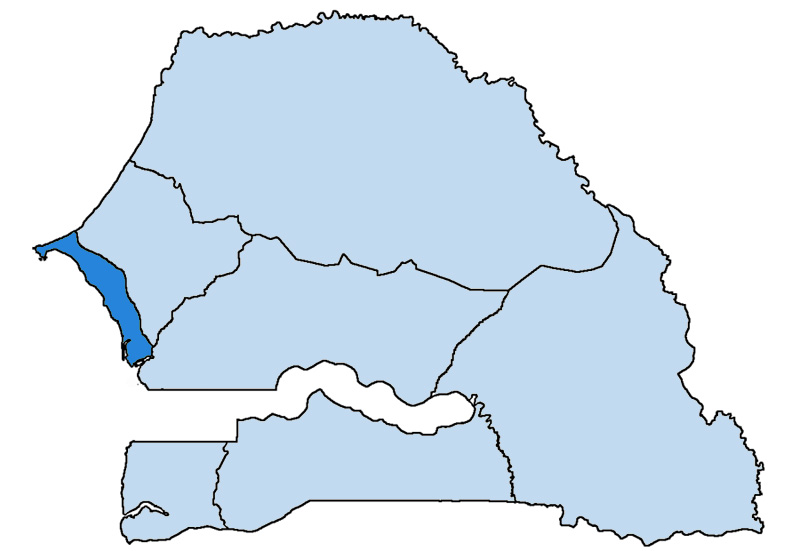
- Map of the Archdiocese of Dakar

The Roman Catholic Archdiocese of Dakar (Latin: Dakaren(sis), French: Archidiocèse catholique romain de Dakar) is the Metropolitan See for the ecclesiastical province of Dakar in Senegal.

== History ==
- February 2, 1863: Established as Apostolic Vicariate of Senegambia from the Apostolic Vicariate of Two Guineas and Senegambia in Gabon
- January 27, 1936: Renamed as Apostolic Vicariate of Dakar
- September 14, 1955: Promoted as Metropolitan Archdiocese of Dakar

== Special churches ==
The seat of the archbishop is Cathédrale Notre Dame des Victoires in Dakar. There is a Minor Basilica at Basilique Notre-Dame de la Délivrance in Poponguine.

== Bishops ==
=== Ordinaries ===
==== Vicars Apostolic of Senegambia ====
- Magloire-Désiré Barthet (1889-1898)
- Joachim-Pierre Buléon, C.S.Sp. (1899-1900)
- François-Nicolas-Alphonse Kunemann, C.S.Sp. (1901-1908)
- Hyacinthe-Joseph Jalabert, C.S.Sp. (1909-1920)
- Louis Le Hunsec, C.S.Sp. (1920-1926), appointed Superior General of the Congregation of the Holy Spirit

==== Vicars Apostolic of Dakar ====
- Auguste Grimault, C.S.Sp. (1927-1946)
- Marcel-François Lefebvre, C.S.Sp. (1947-1955 see below)

==== Archbishops of Dakar ====
- Marcel-François Lefebvre, C.S.Sp. (see above 1955–1962), appointed Archbishop (personal title) of Tulle, France
- Hyacinthe Thiandoum (1962-2000) (Cardinal in 1976)
- Théodore-Adrien Sarr (2000-2014) (Cardinal in 2007)
- Benjamin Ndiaye (22 December 2014 - 22 February 2025)
- André Guèye (since 22 February 2025)

=== Auxiliary Bishop ===
- Georges-Henri Guibert, C.S.Sp. (1949-1960), appointed Bishop of Saint-Denis-de-La Réunion

== Suffragan Dioceses ==
- Kaolack
- Kolda
- Saint-Louis du Sénégal
- Tambacounda
- Thiès
- Ziguinchor

== See also ==
- Roman Catholicism in Senegal
- List of Roman Catholic dioceses in Senegal

== Sources ==
- GCatholic.org
