= Diocese of Ziguinchor =

Roman Catholic diocese in Senegal

Coordinates: 12.5833°N 16.2724°W

Diocese of Ziguinchor Dioecesis Ziguinchorensis
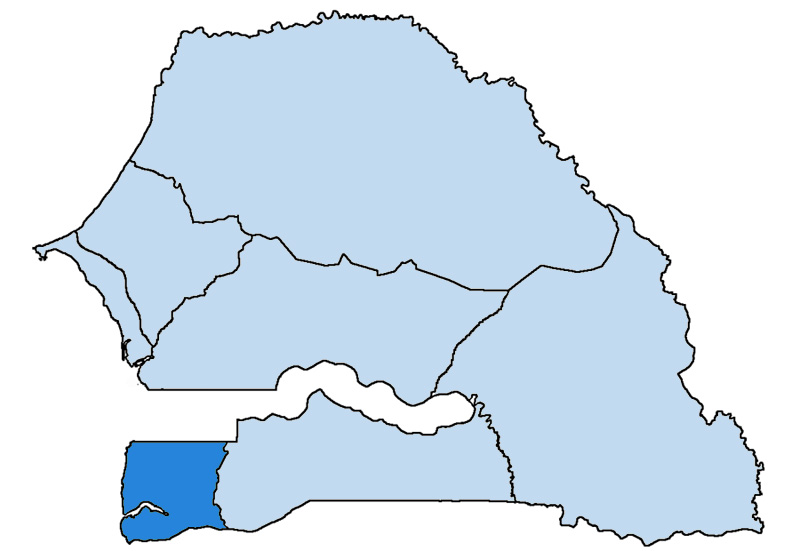
- Map of the Diocese of Ziguinchor

Location
- Country: Senegal
- Metropolitan: Dakar

Statistics
- Area: 7,339 km^{2} (2,834 sq mi)
- Population: Total; Catholics: (as of 2004); 562,000; 93,750 (16.7%)

Information
- Rite: Latin Rite

Current leadership
- Pope: Leo XIV
- Bishop: Jean Baptiste Valter Manga

Senegal - Diocesi di Ziguinchor.jpg

The Roman Catholic Diocese of Ziguinchor (Latin: Ziguinchoren(sis), French: Diocèse catholique romain de Ziguinchor) is a diocese located in the city of Ziguinchor in the ecclesiastical province of Dakar in Senegal.

== History ==
- April 25, 1939: Established as Apostolic Prefecture of Ziguinchor from Apostolic Vicariate of Dakar
- July 10, 1952: Promoted as Apostolic Vicariate of Ziguinchor
- September 14, 1955: Promoted as Diocese of Ziguinchor

== Special churches ==
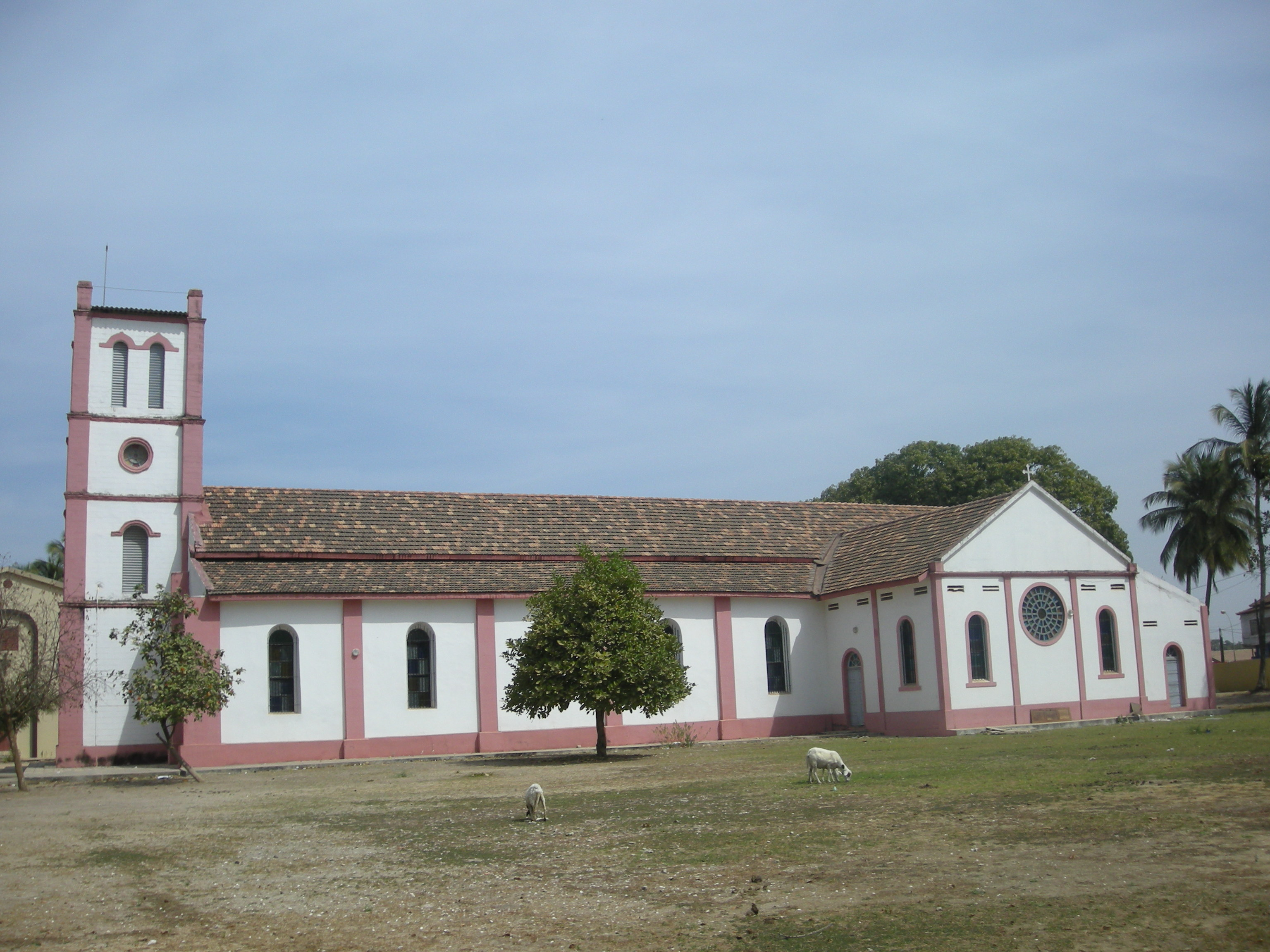
The Cathedral of Ziguinchor

- The cathedral is Cathédrale Saint Antoine de Padoue in Ziguinchor.

== Bishops ==
- Prefects Apostolic of Ziguinchor (Roman rite)
  - Fr. Giuseppe Fayec, C.S.Sp. (1939.05.31 – 1947)
  - Fr. Prosper Dodds, C.S.Sp. (1947.06.13 – 1952.07.10 see below)
- Vicar Apostolic of Ziguinchor (Roman rite)
  - Bishop Prosper Dodds, C.S.Sp. (see above 1952.07.10 – 1955.09.14 see below)
- Bishops of Ziguinchor (Roman rite)
  - Bishop Prosper Dodds, C.S.Sp. (see above 1955.09.14 – 1966.02.15)
  - Bishop Augustin Sagna (1966.09.29 – 1995.10.23)
  - Bishop Maixent Coly (1995.10.23 – 2010.08.24)
  - Bishop Paul Abel Mamba Diatta (2012.01.25 – 2021.11.04)
  - Bishop Jean Baptiste Valter Manga (since 20 June 2024)

=== Coadjutor Bishop ===
- Maixent Coly (1993-1995)

== See also ==
- Roman Catholicism in Senegal

== Sources ==
- GCatholic.org
- Catholic Hierarchy
