= Catholic Church in Senegal =

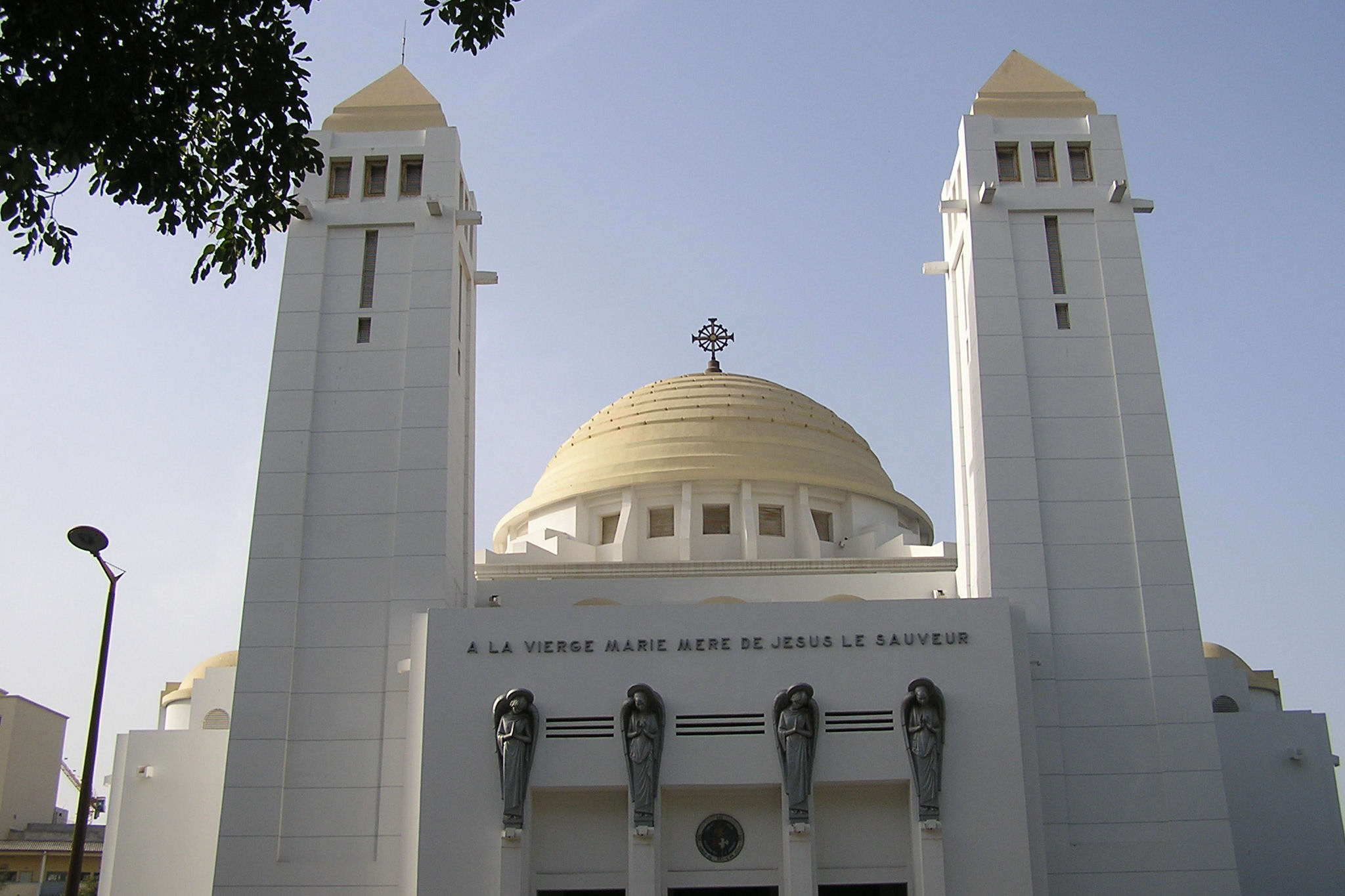
Our Lady of Victories Cathedral, Dakar, seat of the Archdiocese of Dakar

The Catholic Church has been active in Senegal since the 1630s, with an earlier attempt by the Portuguese. An apostolic prefecture was established in Saint-Louis, Senegal, in 1779. The Maronite Church is active in Senegal.

== History ==
=== Organisation ===
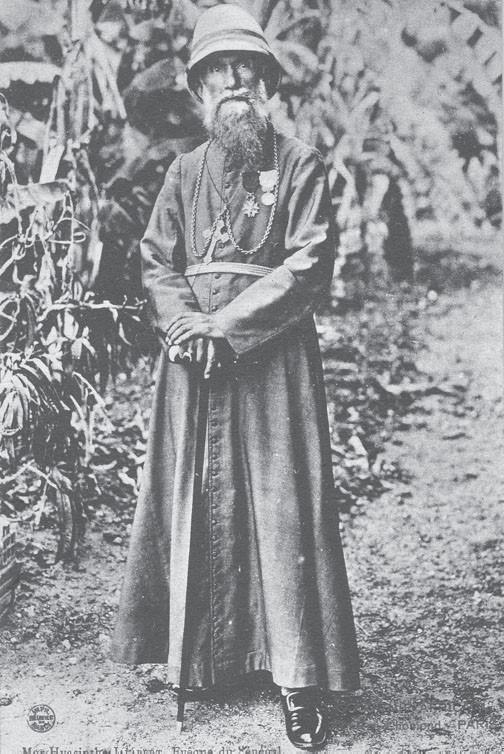
Hyacinthe-Joseph Jalabert served as the bishop of Senegambia from 1909 to 1920. During his tenure secularisation rules were relaxed and the first work on the first cathedral in French West Africa started.

The Portuguese unsuccessfully attempted to spread Catholicism in the Jolof Empire. Members of the Order of Friars Minor Capuchin established a missionary effort at the Petite Côte in the 1630s.

The Apostolic Prefecture of Saint-Louis was established in 1779. The Vicariate of the Two Guineas and Sierra Leone was established in 1842. The Vicariate of Senegambia was separated from the Vicariate of the Two Guineas and Sierra Leone in 1863. The Roman Catholic Diocese of Saint-Louis du Sénégal was established in 1966.

Funding from the Association of the Holy Childhood for church activies in Senegal declined in the early 1900s. Funding declined from 40,000 francs per year from 1901 to 1908, to 35,000 francs from 1909 to 1914, and 11,000 francs in 1915. A local branch of the Oeuvre du denier du culte, a public fund for religious services, was established in 1915.

The church in Dakar, which was used by the bishop, was destroyed in 1907, due to the foundation shifting. Bishop Hyacinthe-Joseph Jalabert launched construction on the first Catholic cathedral in French West Africa in 1911. The project, Our Lady of Victories Cathedral (also Cathédrale du Souvenir Africain, "African Cathedral of Remembrance"), was located in Dakar, and was consecrated on 25 January 1936.

Vatican officials appointed Joseph Faye as the chief executive of the Spiritan mission in Casamance in 1938, despite opposition from both Spiritan leaders and Faye himself. Pope Pius XII allowed Faye, who disliked his job, to retire in 1946. There would not be another black person in the leadership of the Catholic Church in Senegal until Hyacinthe Thiandoum, who came from a Muslim family, was appointed archbishop of Dakar in 1962.

The Maronite Church is active in Senegal. Lebanese people arrived in Senegal during its time under French rule. Abbot Augustin Sarkis constructed Notre Dame du Liban, the first Maronite institution in West Africa, in Dakar in 1952.

=== People ===
For the 59 year timeframe between 1758 and 1817, there were no priests in Saint-Louis for 44 years and none in Gorée for 30 years. A mission sent by Francis Libermann in 1845 established a base in Dakar. Libermann's mission merged with the Congregation of the Holy Spirit and the Spiritans would oversee the church in Senegal until 1962.

Abbé Lambert, a priest in the 1840s, learned the Wolof language. Jean-Pierre Moussa became the first black priest in Senegal in 1841. Moussa ministered to former slaves in the area before being invited by Emperor Faustin Soulouque to serve as a parish priest in Port-au-Prince, where he died on 23 July 1860. Prosper Dodds was the first Senegalese person to serve as a bishop.

All of the priests in Senegal eligible for service in World War I, 14 of the 41 priests, were mobilised by 7 August 1914. Priests with language skills were taken out of Senegal in 1916.

=== Suppression ===
A petition from sent from Senegal to London on 22 August 1775, claimed that Charles O'Hara was attempting to abolish the Catholic Church and preventing proper Catholic burials.

The Chamber of Deputies passed a resolution on 22 January 1903, which called for secularism to be instituted in the colonies. All of the public schools were secular and nuns were no longer employed at hospitals in Senegal by 1905. Interim Governor Joost van Vollenhoven cancelled the state salaries for Spiritan clergy in 1907. Bishop François-Nicolas-Alphonse Kunemann considered moving the headquarters of the church to the British-held Gambia Colony and Protectorate.

On 2 August 1914, Interior Minister Louis Malvy issued an order to suspend anti-religious laws. The flag of the Fourth Senegalese Battalion was blessed by Hyacinthe-Joseph Jalabert in 1916. Nuns were employed at hospitals during the Spanish flu epidemic.

== Education ==
Members of the Brothers of Christian Instruction came to Saint-Louis in 1841, and Gorée in 1849. They provided aid to schools in Senegal until being driven out by anti-clerical legislation in 1903.

The Fonds d'Investissements pour le Developpement Economique et Social was launched in 1946, and its funding resulted in an expansion of Catholic schools in Senegal. Enrollment in these schools rose from 1,457 (8.6% of the total student body of Senegal) in 1937, to 3,631 (14%) in 1948, and 21,739 (15%) in 1962. As of 2021, there were 316 registered Catholic schools in Senegal with around 120,000 students.

== Population ==
Catholics were a majority of the population in Saint-Louis until the late 19th century. There were 400 to 500 Lebanese Maronites in 2013.

Léopold Sédar Senghor, the first President of Senegal from 1960 to 1980, was Catholic.

== Divisions ==
- Dakar
  - Kaolack
  - Kolda
  - Saint-Louis du Sénégal
  - Tambacounda
  - Thiès
  - Ziguinchor

== Leadership ==
- François-Nicolas-Alphonse Kunemann, bishop of Senegambia (1880s)
- Magloire-Désiré Barthet, bishop of Senegambia (1889–1898)
- Alphonse Kunemann, bishop of Senegambia (1900s)
- Hyacinthe-Joseph Jalabert, bishop of Senegambia (1909–1920)

== See also ==
- Religion in Senegal

== Works cited ==
=== Books ===
- Foster, Elizabeth (2013). Faith in Empire: Religion, Politics, and Colonial Rule in French Senegal, 1880–1940. Stanford University Press. ISBN 9780804786225.
- Jones, Hilary (2013). The Métis of Senegal: Urban Life and Politics in French West Africa. Indiana University Press. ISBN 9780253007056.

=== Journals ===
- Jones, D. (1980). "The Catholic Mission and Some Aspects of Assimilation in Senegal, 1817-1852". The Journal of African History. 21 (3). Cambridge University Press: 323–340. doi:10.2307/181187. JSTOR 181187.
- Kantrowitz, Rachel (2018). "Catholic Schools as 'A Nation in Miniature': Catholic Civism in Senegal and Benin, 1960-1970s". The Journal of African History. 59 (2). Cambridge University Press: 221–239. doi:10.2307/26846804. JSTOR 26846804.
- Leichtman, Mara (2013). "From the Cross (and Crescent) to the Cedar and Back Again: Transnational Religion and Politics Among Lebanese Christians in Senegal". Anthropological Quarterly. 86 (1). George Washington University: 35–75. doi:10.2307/41857311. JSTOR 41857311.
- Stepan, Alfred (2012). "Rituals of Respect: Sufis and Secularists in Senegal in Comparative Perspective". Comparative Politics. 44 (4). New York University: 379–401. doi:10.2307/23211818. JSTOR 23211818.

=== News ===
- Isenjia, Silas (12 January 2023). "Pope Francis Accepts Retirement of Catholic Bishop of Saint-Louis Diocese in Senegal". Catholic News Agency. Archived from the original on 11 July 2025.

=== Web ===
- "2021 Report on International Religious Freedom: Senegal". United States Department of State. Archived from the original on 10 July 2025.
