= List of Catholic dioceses in Paraguay =

The diocesan system of Catholic church government in Paraguay comprises only a Latin hierarchy, joint in the nation episcopal conference, no Eastern Catholic jurisdiction:

- one ecclesiastical province, headed by a Metropolitan archbishop. The provinces are in turn subdivided into eleven suffragan dioceses, each headed by a bishop.
- two missionary, pre-diocesan (exempt) Apostolic Vicariates
- the also exempt military Ordinariate.

All defunct jurisdictions are direct precursors of current ones.

There is also an Apostolic Nunciature to Paraguay as papal diplomatic representation (embassy level).

== Current Latin Dioceses ==
=== Ecclesiastical province of Asunción ===
- Metropolitan Archdiocese of Asunción
  - Diocese of Benjamín Aceval
  - Diocese of Caacupé
  - Diocese of Canindeyú
  - Diocese of Carapeguá
  - Diocese of Ciudad del Este
  - Diocese of Concepción en Paraguay
  - Diocese of Coronel Oviedo
  - Diocese of Encarnación
  - Diocese of San Juan Bautista de las Misiones
  - Diocese of San Lorenzo
  - Diocese of San Pedro
  - Diocese of Villarrica del Espíritu Santo

=== Latin Sui iuris Jurisdictions ===
- Military Bishopric of Paraguay (for armed forces and paramilitary police)

=== Pre-diocesan ===
- Apostolic Vicariate of Chaco Paraguayo
- Apostolic Vicariate of Pilcomayo

== See also ==
- List of Catholic dioceses (structured view)

== Sources and external links ==
- GCatholic.org.
- Catholic-Hierarchy entry.
