= Estigarribia (surname) =

Estigarribia is a surname of Basque origin. Notable people with the surname include:

== First surname ==
- Antonio de la Cruz Estigarribia, Paraguayan military officer
- Carlos Estigarribia, Paraguayan footballer
- Germán Estigarribia, Argentine footballer
- José Félix Estigarribia, Paraguayan military officer and President
- Julio César Estigarribia, Paraguayan footballer
- Richard Estigarribia, Paraguayan footballer
- Marcelo Estigarribia, Paraguayan footballer

== Second surname ==
- Bernardino Soto Estigarribia, Paraguayan military officer and minister
- Celso Yegros Estigarribia, Paraguayan Roman Catholic cleric
- José Félix Fernández Estigarribia, Paraguayan diplomat
- Leticia Gonzalez Estigarribia, Welsh politician

== See also ==
- Juan Eulogio Estigarribia, a populated place in Caaguazú Department, Paraguay
- Mariscal Estigarribia (Asunción), a neighbourhood in Asunción, Paraguay
- Mariscal Estigarribia, a populated place in Boquerón Department, Paraguay
