= Episcopal Conference of Paraguay =

Assembly of Catholic bishops

The Paraguayan Episcopal Conference (Spanish: Conferencia Episcopal Paraguaya, CEP) is an agency of the Catholic Church which gathers the bishops of Paraguay.

== History ==
Since 1929 some bishops of the country are beginning to exercise a collegial teaching by issuing joint pastoral letters and decrees, and agree to meet regularly since 1955. The following year he founded the Episcopal Conference in Paraguay, which then becomes Venerable Episcopado Paraguayo, and finally assumed its present name in 1960.

== Members and bodies ==
They are part of the PEC archbishops and bishops (owners, retired, brothers) of the Catholic Church in Paraguay, including the ordinary soldier.

== List of presidents ==
- 1958–1970: Juan José Aníbal Mena Porta
- 1970–1973: Pastor Ramon Bogarín Argana
- 1973–1985: Felipe Santiago Benítez Avalos
- 1985–1989: Ismael Blas Rolón Silvero
- 1989–1990: Felipe Santiago Benítez Avalos
- 1990–1994: Jorge Adolfo Carlos Livieres Banks
- 1994–1999: Oscar Páez Garcete
- 1999–2002: Jorge Adolfo Carlos Livieres Banks
- 2002–2005: Claudio Giménez Medina
- 2005–2009: Ignacio Gogorza Izaguirre
- 2009–2011: Pastor Cuquejo
- 2011–2015: Claudio Giménez Medina
- 2015–2018: Edmundo Valenzuela
