= Cándido Cárdenas Villalba =

Paraguayan Roman Catholic prelate (1941–2026)

- Bishop Emeritus of Benjamín Aceval
- Archdiocese: Asunción
- Diocese: Benjamín Aceval
- Appointed: 6 July 1998
- Term ended: 16 June 2018
- Predecessor: Mario Melanio Medina Salinas
- Successor: Amancio Francisco Benítez Candia

Orders
- Ordination: 12 July 1970
- Consecration: 20 September 1998 by Felipe Santiago Benítez Ávalos, Celso Yegros Estigarribia and Mario Melanio Medina Salinas

Personal details
- Born: 3 October 1941 Sapucaí, Paraguay
- Died: 16 August 2026 (aged 84) Villa Hayes, Paraguay
- Motto: Semina et irriga

Cándido Cárdenas Villalba (3 October 1941 – 18 August 2026) was a Paraguayan Roman Catholic prelate. He served as bishop of the Roman Catholic Diocese of Benjamín Aceval from 1998 to 2018.

Cárdenas Villalba died in Villa Hayes on 18 August 2026, at the age of 84.

Catholic Church titles
Preceded by Mario Melanio Medina Salinas	Bishop of Benjamín Aceval; 1998–2018	Succeeded by Amancio Francisco Benítez Candia
