= Sebelio Peralta Álvarez =

- Bishop of San Lorenzo
- Church: Catholic Church
- Diocese: Diocese of San Lorenzo
- In office: 27 December 2008 – 19 November 2014
- Predecessor: Adalberto Martínez Flores
- Successor: Joaquín Hermes Robledo Romero
- Previous posts: Bishop of Villarrica del Espíritu Santo (1990-2008); Auxiliary Bishop of Villarrica del Espíritu Santo (1990); Titular Bishop of Iunca in Mauretania (1979-1990); Auxiliary Bishop of Villarrica (1979-1990)

Orders
- Ordination: 19 December 1964
- Consecration: 1 May 1979 by Felipe Santiago Benítez Ávalos

Personal details
- Born: 19 September 1939 Borja, Guairá Department, Paraguay
- Died: 19 November 2014 (aged 75)

Sebelio Peralta Álvarez (19 September 1939 – 19 November 2014) was a Roman Catholic bishop.

Ordained to the priesthood in 1964, Peralta Álvarez was named auxiliary bishop of the Roman Catholic Diocese of Villarrica, Paraguay in 1979. He was then named bishop of the Diocese of Villerrica del Espíritu Santo in 1990. In 2008, he was named bishop of the Roman Catholic Diocese of San Lorenzo.
