= Faustino Casas Hernández =

Spanish Roman Catholic prelate

Most Reverend Faustino Casas Hernández
- Bishop of Paraguay
- Church: Catholic Church
- Diocese: Diocese of Asunción
- In office: 1674–1686
- Predecessor: Ferdinandus de Valcácer
- Successor: Sebastián de Pastrana

Orders
- Consecration: 1675

Personal details
- Born: 1604 Casarrubuelos, Spain
- Died: 2 August 1686 (age 82)

Faustino Casas Hernández, O. de M. (1604–1686) was a Roman Catholic prelate who served as Bishop of Paraguay (1674–1686).

== Biography ==
Faustino Casas Hernández was born in Casarrubuelos, Spain in 1604 and ordained a priest in the Order of the Blessed Virgin Mary of Mercy. On 7 December 1674, he was appointed during the papacy of Pope Clement X as Bishop of Paraguay. In 1675, he was consecrated bishop. He served as Bishop of Paraguay until his death on 2 August 1686.

== External links and additional sources ==
- Cheney, David M. "Archdiocese of Asunción". Catholic-Hierarchy.org. (for Chronology of Bishops) ^{[self-published]}
- Chow, Gabriel. "Metropolitan Archdiocese of Asunción (Paraguay)". GCatholic.org. (for Chronology of Bishops) ^{[self-published]}

Catholic Church titles
Preceded by Ferdinandus de Valcácer	Bishop of Paraguay; 1674–1686	Succeeded by Sebastián de Pastrana
