= Roman Catholic Diocese of Villarrica =

Roman Catholic Diocese of Villarrica may refer to:

- Roman Catholic Diocese of Villarrica in Chile
- Roman Catholic Diocese of Villarrica del Espíritu Santo in Paraguay
