= Military Ordinariate of Paraguay =

Roman Catholic ecclesiastical jurisdiction in Paraguay

Military Bishopric of Paraguay Obispado de las Fuerzas Armadas y la Policia Nacional del Paraguay

Location
- Country: Paraguay

Information
- Denomination: Roman Catholic
- Rite: Latin Rite
- Established: 20 December 1961 (64 years ago)

Current leadership
- Pope: Leo XIV
- Bishop: Sede vacante

The Military Bishopric of Paraguay (Spanish: Obispado de las Fuerzas Armadas y la Policia Nacional del Paraguay) is a military ordinariate of the Roman Catholic Church. Immediately subject to the Holy See, it provides pastoral care to Roman Catholics serving in the Paraguayan Armed Forces and their families.

== History ==
It was established as a military vicariate on 20 December 1961, but the first military vicar was not appointed until 7 December 1965. It was elevated to a military ordinariate on 21 July 1986.

== Office holders ==
=== Military vicars ===
- Augustin Rodríguez (appointed 7 December 1965 – died 1969)
- Juan Moleón Andreu (appointed 1 February 1972 – died 20 September 1980 )
- No military vicars (1980–1986).

=== Military ordinaries ===
- No military ordinaries (1986–1992).
- Pastor Cuquejo, C.Ss.R. (appointed 5 May 1992 – transferred to the Archdiocese of Asunción 15 June 2002)
- Ricardo Valenzuela Rios (appointed 24 May 2003 – transferred to the Diocese of Villarrica del Espíritu Santo 25 Jun 2010)
- Adalberto Martínez Flores (appointed 14 Mar 2012 - transferred to the Diocese of Villarrica del Espíritu Santo 23 Jun 2018)
