= Diocese of Canindeyú =

Roman Catholic diocese in Paraguay

Location
- Country: Paraguay
- Metropolitan: Asunción

Statistics
- Area: 14,667 km^{2} (5,663 sq mi)
- Population: Total; Catholics: (as of 2024); 239,386; 211,138 (88.1%)

Information
- Sui iuris church: Latin Church
- Rite: Roman Rite
- Established: February 10, 2024; 20 months ago
- Cathedral: Iglesia Catedral Sagrado Corazón De Jesús

Current leadership
- Pope: Leo XIV
- Bishop: Roberto Zacarías

The Roman Catholic Diocese of Canindeyú is a diocese of the Roman Catholic Church based in the city of Katueté, in the Ecclesiastical Province of Asunción in Paraguay.

== History ==
The diocese was created by Pope Francis on February 10, 2024, from territory of the Diocese of Ciudad del Este. The new diocese covers the entire civil Canindeyú Department. In the same decree which erected the diocese, the Pope named Roberto Carlos Zacarías López as the diocese's first bishop. Zacarías was consecrated bishop by Cardinal Adalberto Martínez of Asunción, Bishop Pedro Collar Noguera of Ciudad del Este, and Bishop Wilhelm Steckling auxiliary for Ciudad del Este.

== Leadership ==
No.	Name	Episcopacy
1	Roberto Zacarías (b. 1972)	10 February 2024 – Incumbent
