= Reginaldo de Lizárraga =

Spanish prelate

The Most Reverend Reginaldo de Lizárraga
- Bishop of Paraguay
- Church: Catholic Church
- Diocese: Diocese of Paraguay
- In office: 1609
- Predecessor: Martín Ignacio de Loyola
- Successor: Lorenzo Pérez de Grado
- Previous post: Bishop of Concepción (1598–1609)

Orders
- Consecration: 24 October 1599 by Toribio Alfonso de Mogrovejo

Personal details
- Born: 1535 Lizarraga, Spain
- Died: 10 November 1609 (aged 73–74) Asunción, Paraguay

Reginaldo de Lizárraga, O.P. (1535 – 10 November 1609) was a Roman Catholic prelate who served as Bishop of Paraguay (1609) and Bishop of Concepción in Chile (1598–1609).

== Biography ==
Reginaldo de Lizárraga was born in Lizarraga, Spain and ordained a priest in the Order of Preachers. On 31 August 1598, he was confirmed by Pope Clement VIII as Bishop of Concepción and installed in December 1602. On 24 October 1599, he was consecrated bishop by Toribio Alfonso de Mogrovejo, Archbishop of Lima. On 20 July 1609, he was appointed during the papacy of Pope Paul V as Bishop of Paraguay. He served as Bishop of Paraguay until his death on 10 November 1609.

== External links and additional sources ==
- Cheney, David M. "Archdiocese of Concepción (Santissima Concezione)". Catholic-Hierarchy.org. (for Chronology of Bishops) ^{[self-published]}
- Chow, Gabriel. "Titular Episcopal See of La Imperial (Chile)". GCatholic.org. (for Chronology of Bishops) ^{[self-published]}
- Chow, Gabriel. "Metropolitan Archdiocese of Concepción (Chile)". GCatholic.org. (for Chronology of Bishops) ^{[self-published]}
- Cheney, David M. "Archdiocese of Asunción". Catholic-Hierarchy.org. (for Chronology of Bishops) ^{[self-published]}
- Chow, Gabriel. "Metropolitan Archdiocese of Asunción (Paraguay)". GCatholic.org. (for Chronology of Bishops) ^{[self-published]}

Catholic Church titles
Preceded by Agustín de Cisneros Montesa	Bishop of Concepción; 1598–1609	Succeeded by Carlos Marcelo Corni Velazquez
Preceded by Martín Ignacio de Loyola	Bishop of Paraguay; 1609	Succeeded by Lorenzo Pérez de Grado
