= Diocese of Caazapá =

Roman Catholic diocese in Paraguay

Coordinates: 26.2000°S 56.3800°W

Diocese of Caazapá Dioecesis Caazapá

Location
- Country: Paraguay
- Metropolitan: Asunción

Statistics
- Area: 9,496 km^{2} (3,666 sq mi)
- Population: Total; Catholics: (as of 2025); 194,512; 171,170 (88.0%)

Information
- Rite: Latin Rite

Current leadership
- Pope: Leo XIV
- Bishop: Marcelo Benítez Martínez

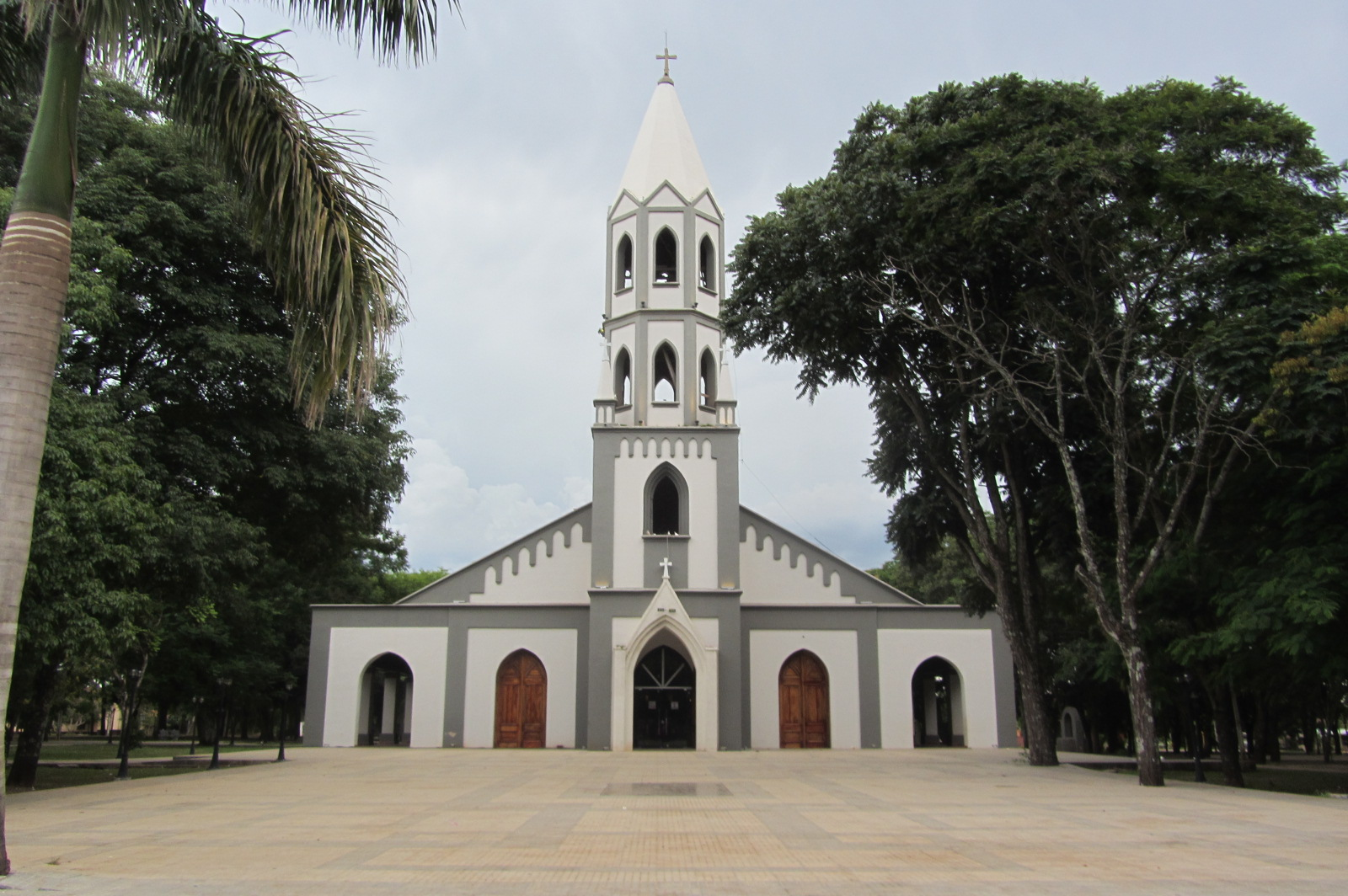
Iglesia de San Pablo, Caazapá.

The Roman Catholic Diocese of Caazapá (Latin: Dioecesis Caazapá) is a diocese located in the city of Caazapá in the ecclesiastical province of Asunción in Paraguay.

== History ==
- On March 25, 2025, Pope Francis established the Diocese of Caazapá from the Diocese of Villarrica.

== Bishops ==
No.	Name	Episcopacy
1	Marcelo Benítez Martínez (b. 1956)	22 March 2025 – Incumbent
