= Diocese of Paraguay =

Diocese of Paraguay may refer to:

- the Anglican Church of South America Diocese of Paraguay
- the Roman Catholic Archdiocese of Asunción (known as the Diocese of Paraguay, 1547–1929)
