= Boreum =

Boreum may refer to:

- Bo-reum, a Korean given name
- Daeboreum, a Korean holiday and festival occasion
- Boreum, meaning 15 days in Korea
- Boreum, Cyrenaica, an Ancient city and bishopric in Roman Libya, now a Catholic titular see
- Planum Boreum, the northern polar plain on Mars
  - Mare Boreum quadrangle, a geographic quadrangle named after Planum Boreum
