= Rogelio Ricardo Livieres Plano =

Argentine prelate

- Bishop of Ciudad del Este
- Church: Catholic Church
- Diocese: Diocese of Ciudad del Este
- In office: 12 July 2004 – 25 September 2014
- Predecessor: Ignacio Gogorza Izaguirre
- Successor: Wilhelm Steckling

Orders
- Ordination: 15 August 1978 by Franz König
- Consecration: 3 October 2004 by Pastor Cuquejo

Personal details
- Born: 30 August 1945 Corrientes, Argentina
- Died: 14 August 2015 (aged 69) Buenos Aires, Argentina

Rogelio Ricardo Livieres Plano (30 August 1945 – 14 August 2015) was an Argentine prelate of the Catholic Church who was Bishop of Ciudad del Este, Paraguay, from 2004 to 2014.

== Biography ==
Born in Corrientes, Argentina, on 30 August 1945, Rogelio Ricardo Livieres Plano attended Goethe and San José Colleges in Asunción. He joined Opus Dei as a numerary member in 1964. He then studied in Paraguay, Italy and Spain, earning a law degree at the Catholic University "Nuestra Señora de la Asunción", a theology degree at the International Roman College of the Holy Cross in Rome, a Master's in Administrative Law at the Complutense University of Madrid and a doctorate in canon law at the University of Navarra.

Livieres Plano was ordained to the priesthood on 15 August 1978 at the Shrine of Torreciudad, Spain. He was responsible for training numerary members of Opus Dei in Buenos Aires from 1978 to 1983. He was Vicar of the Prelature of the Holy Cross and Opus Dei in Buenos Aires and the surrounding area from 1983 to 1991. He taught moral theology in the Faculty of Law and Engineering of the Austral University of the Argentine Capital and, at the same time, Chaplain of the university students from 1991 to 2002. He then moved to the Archdiocese of Asunción where he was chaplain of the "Ykuá" University Center.

On 12 July 2004, Pope John Paul II appointed him Bishop of Ciudad del Este in Paraguay. He received his episcopal consecration on 3 October from Pastor Cuquejo, Archbishop of Asunción.

On 25 September 2014, when Livieres Plano was 69 years old, Pope Francis removed him as Bishop of Ciudad del Este and appointed Ricardo Jorge Valenzuela Rios, Bishop of Villarrica del Espíritu Santo, as apostolic administrator of the diocese.

On 29 July 2015, two bishops visited him in the hospital: Heinz Wilhelm Steckling, his successor in Ciudad del Este, and Edmundo Valenzuela, Archbishop of Asunción.

He died of liver disease and diabetes in a Buenos Aires hospital on 14 August 2015.
