= Melchor Maldonado y Saavedra =

Most Reverend Melchor Maldonado y Saavedra
- Bishop of Córdoba
- Church: Catholic Church
- Diocese: Diocese of Córdoba
- In office: 1635–1662
- Predecessor: Tomás de la Torre Gibaja
- Successor: Francisco de Borja y Miguel

Orders
- Consecration: 1633 by Hernando de Arias y Ugarte

Personal details
- Born: 1588 Río de la Hacha
- Died: 11 February 1662 (age 74) Córdoba, Argentina

Melchor Maldonado y Saavedra, O.S.A. (1588–1662) was a Roman Catholic prelate who served as Bishop of Córdoba (1635–1662).

== Biography ==
Melchor Maldonado y Saavedra was born in Río de la Hacha in 1588 and ordained a priest in the Order of Saint Augustine. On 20 September 1631, he was selected as Bishop of Córdoba and confirmed by Pope Urban VIII on 8 March 1632. In 1633, he was consecrated bishop by Hernando de Arias y Ugarte, Archbishop of Lima. He was installed on 27 June 1635. He served as Bishop of Córdoba until his death on 11 February 1662. While bishop, he was the principal consecrator of Bernardino de Cárdenas Ponce, Bishop of Paraguay (1641); and the principal co-consecrator of Pedro de Villagómez Vivanco, Bishop of Arequipa (1633).

Catholic Church titles
Preceded by Tomás de la Torre Gibaja	Bishop of Córdoba; 1635–1662	Succeeded by Francisco de Borja (bishop)
