= Tomás de la Torre Gibaja =

Most Reverend Tomás de la Torre Gibaja
- Bishop of Córdoba
- Church: Catholic Church
- Predecessor: Julián de Cortázar
- Successor: Melchor Maldonado y Saavedra
- Previous post: Bishop of Paraguay (1620–1628)

Orders
- Consecration: 15 August 1621 by Pedro Carranza Salinas

Personal details
- Born: 1570 Madrid, Spain
- Died: 17 July 1630 (age 60) Córdoba, Argentina

Tomás de la Torre Gibaja, O.P. or Tomás de Torres (1570–1630) was a Catholic prelate who served as Bishop of Córdoba (1628–1630) and Bishop of Paraguay (1620–1628).

== Biography ==
Tomás de la Torre Gibaja was born in Madrid, Spain in 1570 and ordained a priest in the Order of Preachers. On 30 March 1620, he was appointed during the papacy of Pope Paul V as Bishop of Paraguay. On 15 August 1621, he was consecrated bishop by Pedro Carranza Salinas, Bishop of Buenos Aires. On 3 September 1628, he was selected as Bishop of Córdoba and confirmed by Pope Urban VIII on 11 December 1628. He served as Bishop of Córdoba until his death on 17 July 1630.

== External links and additional sources ==
- Cheney, David M. "Archdiocese of Asunción". Catholic-Hierarchy.org. (for Chronology of Bishops) ^{[self-published]}
- Chow, Gabriel. "Metropolitan Archdiocese of Asunción (Paraguay)". GCatholic.org. (for Chronology of Bishops) ^{[self-published]}
- Cheney, David M. "Archdiocese of Córdoba". Catholic-Hierarchy.org. (for Chronology of Bishops) ^{[self-published]}
- Chow, Gabriel. "Diocese of Santiago del Estero (Argentina)". GCatholic.org. (for Chronology of Bishops) ^{[self-published]}

Catholic Church titles
Preceded by Lorenzo Pérez de Grado	Bishop of Paraguay; 1620–1628	Succeeded by Cristóbal de Aresti Martínez de Aguilar
Preceded by Julián de Cortázar	Bishop of Córdoba; 1628–1630	Succeeded by Melchor Maldonado y Saavedra
