= Hexamili =

Hexamili may refer to the following places :

- the modern site of Chersonesus in Europa, an ancient city in Turkish Thrace
- Examilia, a town in the municipality of Corinth, Greece
