= Ramón Bogarín Argaña =

Paraguayan writer and bishop

Ramón Pastor Bogarín Argaña
- Bishop of San Juan Bautista de las Misiones
- Church: Catholic Church
- Diocese: Diocese of San Juan Bautista de las Misiones
- In office: 19 January 1957 – 3 September 1976
- Predecessor: Diocese erected
- Successor: Carlos Milcíades Villalba Aquino
- Previous posts: Titular Bishop of Bagis (1954-1957); Auxiliary Bishop of Asunción (1954-1957)

Orders
- Ordination: 16 April 1938
- Consecration: 19 March 1955 by Juan José Aníbal Mena Porta

Personal details
- Born: 30 March 1911 Ypacaraí, Eastern Region, Paraguay
- Died: 3 September 1976 (aged 65) San Juan Bautista, Misiones Department, Paraguay

Ramón Bogarín Argaña (30 March 1911 – 3 September 1976) was a Paraguayan writer and bishop and keynote speaker of Paraguay. He was born in the Central Department of Ypacaraí, Paraguay on 30 March 1911, and died in San Juan Bautista, Department of Missions on 3 September 1976. He was a bishop, a writer and keynote speaker of Paraguay.

== Early years ==
His parents were José María González and Patricio Bogarín de las Nieves Argaña. He was the nephew of Bishop Juan Sinforiano Bogarín and younger brother of another famous minister, Agustín Bogarín with over fifty years of priesthood, many of which were served as head of the parish of Encarnación.

He is from a line of missionaries, martyrs and heroes, among them San Roque Gonzalez of Santa Cruz, Amancio González y Escobar, towns founder and Francisco Javier Bogarín, independence leader and member of the Superior Governing Board of 1811.

== Education and career ==
In 1930 he took up residence in Asunción, where he was an officer candidate in the military movements prior to the Chaco War. In 1931 he posted as a student of the Faculty of Medicine, but a trip to Europe, organized by his family, interrupted his studies.

In France he started a career in mechanical engineering, but left soon after, deciding to lead a life in the priesthood.

He entered the Delayed Vocations Seminary of Saint Llan and then the Pius Latin American Pontifical College in Rome.

He graduated with a Bachelor of Canon Law and Master of Theology. He was ordained as a priest on 16 April 1938, in Rome, the following year he returned to his homeland.

== Work ==
In Asunción he organized the local Catholic Action, of whose Central Board he was appointed Ecclesiastical Advisor, and simultaneously Rector of the Oratory of Our Lady of the Assumption and National Pantheon of Heroes.

He created in 1940 the "Young Workers," and in the years of the totalitarian government of General Higinio Morínigo he founded and directed the weekly newspaper Trabajo, he edited in the Catholic Press, closed because of threats received from sectors loyal to the government in the hectic first half of the decade.

In 1957 the Vatican granted him the degree of primacy of the newly created Diocese of Misiones in Paraguay. He went to reside in San Juan Bautista in Misiones, where he consolidated the episcopal see. In this city he created a seminary, a parochial school and a model farm.

He also participated in other progressive initiatives for the community, making urban improvements. He maintained a permanent and restless activity, including manual or advisory tasks way beyond his ecclesiastical training, especially in the form of building and social development.

Thus contributed significantly to the progress and beautification of the city of San Juan Bautista.

In order to encourage reading he created the Catholic Action Library providing access to books and magazines with the idea of expanding the horizons of young missionaries.

Archbishop Ramon Bogarín is mentioned among those who promoted the founding of the Catholic University of Asunción, together with doctor and priest Juan Moleón Andreu and Professor Mario Luis De Finis, both professors at the Faculty of Medicine, National University.

He also served in the ecumenical work of the Church, especially in Latin America, speaking in 1965 on the establishment of the Episcopal Conference in Medellín, Colombia, consolidated later as CELAM, which was a subsidiary of the CEP, Paraguayan Episcopal Conference, of which he was the first secretary.

== Death ==
He died suddenly on 3 November 1976, in the diocese of San Juan Bautista in Misiones, at 65 years old, as a result of a myocardial infarction.

The priest was known for his leadership of Catholic youth movements, his work as a speaker and writer, and his opposition to dictatorial governments.
