= Apostolic Vicariate of Pilcomayo =

Latin Catholic missionary jurisdiction in Paraguay

Apostolic Vicariate of Pilcomayo Apostolicus Vicariatus Pilcomayoënsis

Location
- Country: Paraguay
- Ecclesiastical province: Immediately exempt to the Holy See

Statistics
- Area: 125,000 km^{2} (48,000 sq mi)
- Population: Total; Catholics: (as of 2010); 83,000; 38,700 (46.6%)
- Parishes: 5

Information
- Denomination: Catholic Church
- Sui iuris church: Latin Church
- Rite: Roman Rite
- Established: 14 July 1950 (75 years ago)

Current leadership
- Pope: Leo XIV
- Vicar Apostolic: Miguel Fritz, O.M.I.
- Bishops emeritus: Lucio Alfert, O.M.I.

The Vicariate Apostolic of Pilcomayo (Latin: Apostolicus Vicariatus Pilcomayoënsis) is a Latin Church missionary territory or apostolic vicariate of the Catholic Church in Paraguay.

It is exempt to the Holy See, specifically the Roman Congregation for the Evangelization of Peoples, and is not part of any ecclesiastical province.

Its cathedral episcopal see is the (Marian) Catedral Santa María, in Mariscal Estigarribia an area around national capital Asunción, Boquerón department.

== Statistics ==
As per 2014, it pastorally cared for 41,400 Catholics (46.5% of 89,000 total) on 125,000 km² in 6 parishes and 3 missions with 11 priests (3 diocesan, 8 religious), 32 lay religious (12 brothers, 20 sisters) and 4 seminarians.

== History ==
On 14 July 1950, Pope Pius XII established the Apostolic Prefecture of Pilcomayo, on Andean territory named after the Pilcomayo River, split off from the Apostolic Vicariate of Camiri.

It lost territory on 1 May 1929 with the creation of the Diocese of Concepción y Chaco.

Pope Pius XII elevated the prefecture to Apostolic Vicariate of Pilcomayo on 14 July 1950, thus entitling it to a titular bishop.

It lost territory again on 28 June 1980 when the Diocese of Benjamín Aceval was created.

== Ordinaries ==
Apostolic Prefects of Pilcomayo

- Father Giuseppe Rose, Missionary Oblates of Mary Immaculate (O.M.I.) (1925 – death 1927)
- Enrico Breuer, O.M.I. (1927 – death 1932)

Apostolic Vicars of Pilcomayo

- Karl Walter Vervoort, O.M.I. (born Germany) (27 February 1932 – retired 24 August 1962), Titular Bishop of Barica (1950.07.15 – death 1979.07.12)
- Sinforiano Lucas Rojo, O.M.I. (born Spain) (24 August 1962 – retired 24 Jan 1981), Titular Bishop of Boreum (1962.08.24 – death 1990.05.04)
- Pedro Shaw, O.M.I. (born Belgium) (22 April 1981 – death 21 June 1984), Titular Bishop of Crepedula (1981.04.22 – 1984.06.21)
- Lucio Alfert, O.M.I. (born Germany) (24 January 1986 – 18 November 2022), Titular Bishop of Tubyza (1986.01.24 – ...)
- Miguel Fritz, O.M.I. (born Germany) (15 April 2025 – Present)

== See also ==
- Roman Catholicism in Paraguay
- Roman Catholic dioceses in Paraguay

== Sources and external links ==
- GCatholic, with Google satellite photo - data for all sections
