= Zacarías Ortiz Rolón =

Paraguayan Roman Catholic bishop (1934–2020)

Zacarías Ortiz Rolón SDB
- Bishop of Concepción en Paraguay
- Church: Catholic Church
- Diocese: Diocese of Concepción en Paraguay
- In office: 12 July 2003 – 11 July 2013
- Predecessor: Juan Bautista Gavilán Velásquez
- Successor: Miguel Ángel Cabello Almada
- Previous posts: Titular Bishop of Minora (1988-2003); Vicar Apostolic of Chaco Paraguayo (1988-2003)

Orders
- Ordination: 14 August 1965
- Consecration: 26 June 1988 by Ismael Rolón

Personal details
- Born: 6 September 1934 Arroyos y Esteros, Caraguatay Department, Paraguay
- Died: 6 January 2020 (aged 85) Asunción, Paraguay

Zacarías Ortiz Rolón (6 September 1934 – 6 January 2020) was a Paraguayan Roman Catholic bishop.

Ortiz Rolón was born in Paraguay and was ordained to the priesthood in 1965. He served as bishop of the Apostolic Vicariate of Chaco Paraguayo, Paraguay, from 1988 to 2003 and as bishop of the Roman Catholic Diocese of Concepción en Paraguay, Paraguay, from 2003 to 2013.
