= Sebastián de Pastrana =

Most Reverend Sebastián de Pastrana
- Bishop of Paraguay
- Church: Catholic Church
- Diocese: Diocese of Paraguay
- In office: 1693–1700
- Predecessor: Faustino Casas Hernández
- Successor: Pedro Díaz de Durana

Orders
- Consecration: 1697 by Melchor de Liñán y Cisneros

Personal details
- Born: 1633 Lima, Peru
- Died: 4 November 1700 (age 67) Asunción, Paraguay

Sebastián de Pastrana, O. de M. (1633–1700) was a Roman Catholic prelate who was Bishop of Paraguay (1693–1700).

== Biography ==
Sebastián de Pastrana was born in Lima, Peru, in 1633 and ordained a priest in the Order of the Blessed Virgin Mary of Mercy. On 24 August 1693, he was appointed during the papacy of Pope Innocent XII as Bishop of Paraguay. In 1697, he was consecrated bishop by Melchor de Liñán y Cisneros, Archbishop of Lima. He was Bishop of Paraguay until his death on 4 November 1700.

== External links and additional sources ==
- Cheney, David M. "Archdiocese of Asunción". Catholic-Hierarchy.org. (for Chronology of Bishops) ^{[self-published]}
- Chow, Gabriel. "Metropolitan Archdiocese of Asunción (Paraguay)". GCatholic.org. (for Chronology of Bishops) ^{[self-published]}

Catholic Church titles
Preceded by Faustino Casas Hernández	Bishop of Paraguay; 1693–1700	Succeeded by Pedro Díaz de Durana
