= Diocese of Caacupé =

Roman Catholic diocese in Paraguay

Coordinates: 25.3861°S 57.1412°W

Diocese of Caacupé Dioecesis Caacupensis

Catholic

Location
- Country: Paraguay
- Metropolitan: Asunción

Statistics
- Area: 4,948 km^{2} (1,910 sq mi)
- Population: Total; Catholics: (as of 2004); 234,803; 230,125 (98.0%)

Information
- Rite: Latin Rite

Current leadership
- Pope: Leo XIV
- Bishop: Ricardo Valenzuela
- Bishops emeritus: Claudio Giménez

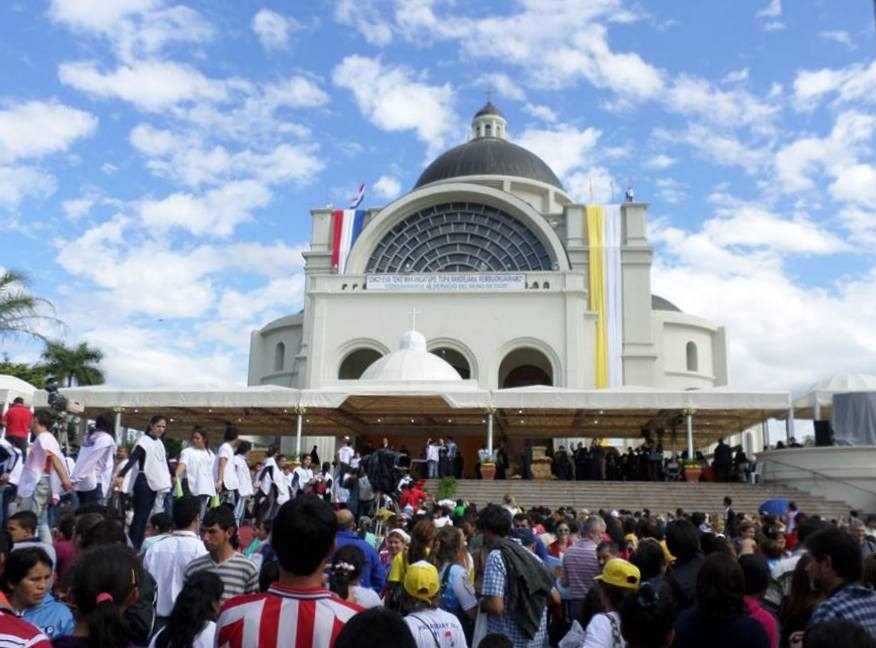
View of the Basilica of Caacupé before the mass officiated by Pope Francis.

The Roman Catholic Diocese of Caacupé (Latin: Dioecesis Caacupensis) is a Latin Rite suffragan diocese in the ecclesiastical province of Archdiocese of Asunción, which covers all and only Paraguay.

Its cathedral episcopal see is a Minor Basilica and National Shrine: Catedral Basílica Nuestra Señora de los Milagros, dedicated to Our Lady of Miracles, in the city of Caacupé, in Cordillera Department.

== History ==
- On 2 August 1960, the Territorial Prelature of Caacupé was established on territories split off from the Archdiocese of Asunción (still its Metropolitan) and from the Diocese of Concepción
- Promoted on 29 March 1967 as Diocese of Caacupé
- It enjoyed Papal visits from Pope John Paul II in May 1988 and Pope Francis in July 2015.

== Statistics ==
As per 2014, it pastorally served 262,724 Catholics (93.0% of 282,481 total) on 4,984 km^{2} in 20 parishes and 2 missions with 29 priests (24 diocesan, 5 religious), 2 deacons, 44 lay religious (7 brothers, 37 sisters), 6 seminarians.

== Leadership ==
No.	Name	Episcopacy
1	Ismael Rolón (Note: As bishop-prelate of the Territorial Prelate of Caacupé from 2 August 1960 to 29 March 1967) (1914–2010)	2 August 1960 – 16 June 1970
2	Demetrio Aquino (1926–2003)	12 June 1971 – 1 November 1994
3	Pastor Cuquejo (Note: As apostolic administrator) (1939–2023)	1 November 1994 – 3 June 1995
4	Claudio Giménez (b. 1940)	3 June 1995 – 29 June 2017
5	Ricardo Valenzuela (b. 1954)	29 June 2017 – Incumbent
