= Lorenzo Pérez de Grado =

Paraguayan Roman Catholic bishop

Most Reverend Lorenzo Pérez de Grado
- Bishop of Cuzco
- Church: Catholic Church
- In office: 1619–1627
- Predecessor: Fernando Mendoza González
- Successor: Fernando de Vera y Zuñiga
- Previous post: Bishop of Paraguay (1615–1619)

Orders
- Consecration: 1616 by Agustín de Carvajal

Personal details
- Died: 4 September 1627 Cuzco, Peru

Lorenzo Pérez de Grado (died 1627) was a Roman Catholic prelate who served as Bishop of Cuzco (1619–1627) and Bishop of Paraguay (1615–1619).

== Biography ==
On 16 September 1615, Lorenzo Pérez de Grado was appointed during the papacy of Pope Paul V as Bishop of Paraguay. In 1616, he was consecrated bishop by Agustín de Carvajal, Bishop of Ayacucho o Huamanga. On 18 March 1619, he was appointed during the papacy of Pope Paul V as Bishop of Cuzco. He served as Bishop of Cuzco until his death on 4 September 1627.

While bishop, he was the principal consecrator of Julián de Cortázar, Bishop of Córdoba (1618).

== External links and additional sources ==
- Cheney, David M. "Archdiocese of Asunción". Catholic-Hierarchy.org. (for Chronology of Bishops) ^{[self-published]}
- Chow, Gabriel. "Metropolitan Archdiocese of Asunción (Paraguay)". GCatholic.org. (for Chronology of Bishops) ^{[self-published]}
- Cheney, David M. "Archdiocese of Cuzco". Catholic-Hierarchy.org. (for Chronology of Bishops) ^{[self-published]}
- Chow, Gabriel. "Metropolitan Archdiocese of Cusco (Peru)". GCatholic.org. (for Chronology of Bishops) ^{[self-published]}

Catholic Church titles
Preceded by Reginaldo de Lizárraga	Bishop of Paraguay; 1615–1619	Succeeded by Tomás de la Torre Gibaja
Preceded by Fernando Mendoza González	Bishop of Cuzco; 1619–1627	Succeeded by Fernando de Vera y Zuñiga
