= Cristóbal de Aresti Martínez de Aguilar =

Catholic bishop in the Spanish Empire

Most Reverend Cristóbal de Aresti Martínez de Aguilar
- Bishop of Buenos Aires
- Church: Catholic Church
- Diocese: Diocese of Buenos Aires
- In office: 1635–1641
- Predecessor: Pedro Carranza Salinas
- Successor: Cristóbal de la Mancha y Velazco
- Previous post: Bishop of Paraguay (1629–1635)

Orders
- Ordination: 10 October 1585

Personal details
- Born: 1578 Valladolid, Spain
- Died: 1641 (aged 62–63) Buenos Aires

Cristóbal de Aresti Martínez de Aguilar, O.S.B. (1578–1641) was a Catholic prelate who served as Bishop of Buenos Aires (1635–1641) and Bishop of Paraguay (1629–1635).

== Biography ==
Cristóbal de Aresti Martínez de Aguilar was born in Valladolid, Spain in 1578 and ordained a priest in the Order of Saint Benedict on 10 October 1585. On 12 February 1629, he was appointed during the papacy of Pope Urban VIII as Bishop of Paraguay. On 3 December 1635, he was appointed during the papacy of Pope Urban VIII as Bishop of Buenos Aires. He served as Bishop of Buenos Aires until his death in 1641.

== External links and additional sources ==
- Cheney, David M. "Archdiocese of Asunción". Catholic-Hierarchy.org. (for Chronology of Bishops) ^{[self-published]}
- Chow, Gabriel. "Metropolitan Archdiocese of Asunción (Paraguay)". GCatholic.org. (for Chronology of Bishops) ^{[self-published]}
- Cheney, David M. "Archdiocese of Buenos Aires". Catholic-Hierarchy.org. (for Chronology of Bishops) ^{[self-published]}
- Chow, Gabriel. "Metropolitan Archdiocese of Buenos Aires (Argentina)". GCatholic.org. (for Chronology of Bishops) ^{[self-published]}

Catholic Church titles
Preceded by Tomás de la Torre Gibaja	Bishop of Paraguay; 1629–1635	Succeeded by Francisco de la Serna
Preceded by Pedro Carranza Salinas	Bishop of Buenos Aires; 1635–1641	Succeeded by Cristóbal de la Mancha y Velazco
