= Carlos Milcíades Villalba Aquino =

Paraguayan Roman Catholic bishop

- Bishop of San Juan Bautista de las Misiones
- Church: Catholic Church
- Diocese: Diocese of San Juan Bautista de las Misiones
- In office: 25 July 1978 – 22 July 1999
- Predecessor: Ramón Bogarín Argaña
- Successor: Mario Melanio Medina

Orders
- Ordination: 28 November 1948
- Consecration: 3 September 1978 by Joseph Mees

Personal details
- Born: 22 August 1924 San Pedro de Ycuamandiyú, San Pedro Department, Paraguay
- Died: 8 January 2016 (aged 91) Asunción, Paraguay

Carlos Milcíades Villalba Aquino (22 August 1924 – 8 January 2016) was a Catholic bishop.

Villalba Aquino was born on 22 August 1924 in San Pedro de Ycuamandiyú, Paraguay. He was ordained to the priesthood on 28 November 1948.

On 25 July 1978, Villalba Aquino was appointed bishop of the Diocese of San Juan Bautista de las Misiones by Pope Paul VI. He was consecrated a bishop on 3 September 1978. He served as bishop of San Juan Bautista de las Misiones until his retirement on 22 July 1999.

Villalba Aquino was also involved in the social and communications work of the Catholic Church in Paraguay. He served as vice president of the Paraguayan Episcopal Conference and represented the Paraguayan episcopate before the Episcopal Conference of Latin America (CELAM). He was also involved in promoting the creation of Radio San Roque González in Ayolas.

Villalba Aquino died in Asunción on 8 January 2016 at the age of 91. He had been hospitalized since December 2015. His remains were taken to San Pedro de Ycuamandiyú and subsequently to the Cathedral of San Juan Bautista, where he was buried.
