= Chersonesus in Europa =

Chersonesus in Europa was an Ancient city and bishopric and is now a Latin Catholic titular see in Turkish Thrace, near modern Hexamili.

== History ==
Hereclea was important enough in the Roman province of Europa to become a suffragan bishopric of its capital Perinthus's Metropolitan Archbishopric. Yet it would fade.

=== Titular see ===
The diocese was nominally restored as a Latin Catholic titular bishopric in 1933.

It is vacant since decades, having had only these two consecutive incumbents :

- Carlos María Cafferata (1956.05.22 – 1961.07.11), as Auxiliary Bishop of Rosario (Argentina) (1956.05.22 – 1961.07.11), later Bishop of San Luis (Argentina) (1961.07.11 – 1971.07.06
- Felipe Santiago Benítez Avalos (1961.08.10 – 1965.12.04) as Auxiliary Bishop of Asunción (Paraguay) (1961.08.10 – 1965.12.04), later Bishop of Villarrica (Paraguay) (1965.12.04 – 1989.05.20), President of Episcopal Conference of Paraguay (1973 – 1985), First Vice-President of Latin American Episcopal Council (1983 – 1987), President of Episcopal Conference of Paraguay (1989 – 1990), Metropolitan Archbishop of Asunción (Paraguay) (1989.05.20 – 2002.06.15)

== See also ==
- Catholic Church in Turkey
