= Diocese of San Lorenzo =

Roman Catholic diocese in Paraguay

Diocese of San Lorenzo Dioecesis Sancti Laurentii Diócesis de San Lorenzo

Catholic
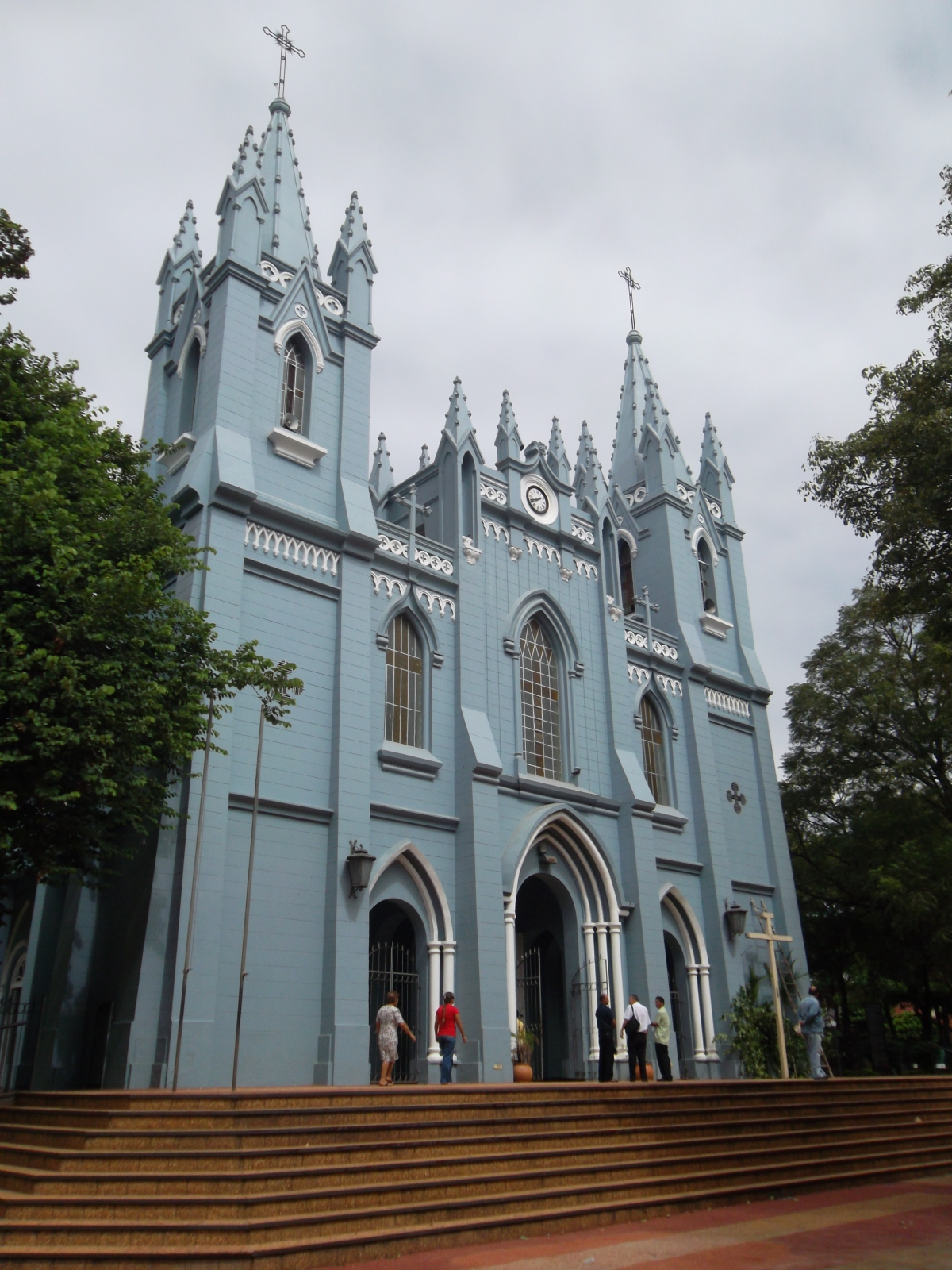
- Cathedral of San Lorenzo

Location
- Country: Paraguay
- Metropolitan: Archdiocese of Asunción
- Headquarters: San Lorenzo, Central Department, Paraguay

Statistics
- Area: 2,045 km^{2} (790 sq mi)
- Population: Total; Catholics: (as of 2023); 1,383,100; 1,244,140 (90.0%)
- Parishes: 22

Information
- Denomination: Catholic Church
- Sui iuris church: Latin Church
- Rite: Roman Rite
- Established: 18 May 2000; 26 years ago
- Cathedral: Catedral San Lorenzo
- Secular priests: 43 (20 Diocesan, 23 Religious Orders)

Current leadership
- Pope: Leo XIV
- Bishop: Pierre Jubinville
- Metropolitan Archbishop: Adalberto Martínez Flores
- Bishops emeritus: Joaquín Hermes Robledo Romero

Map

The Roman Catholic Diocese of San Lorenzo (Latin: Dioecesis Sancti Laurentii) is a diocese located in the city of San Lorenzo in the ecclesiastical province of Asunción in Paraguay.

== History ==
- On 18 May 2000, the Diocese of San Lorenzo was established from the Metropolitan Archdiocese of Asunción

== Leadership ==
=== Bishops of San Lorenzo ===
- Adalberto Martínez Flores (18 May 2000 – 19 February 2007), appointed Bishop of San Pedro
- Sebelio Peralta Álvarez (27 December 2008 – 19 November 2014)
- Joaquín Hermes Robledo Romero (4 July 2015 – 7 November 2026), retired
- Pierre Jubinville, C.S.Sp. (7 November 2026 – Present)
