= Marcelo Benítez Martínez =

Paraguayan Catholic bishop

Marcelo Benítez Martínez OFM
- Bishop of Caazapá
- Church: Catholic Church
- Diocese: Caazapá
- Appointed: 22 March 2025

Orders
- Ordination: 9 April 1994
- Consecration: 10 May 2025 by Vincenzo Turturro

Personal details
- Born: 6 September 1956 (age 69) Santa María, Paraguay
- Education: Universidad Católica "Nuestra Señora de la Asunción" (LTh)

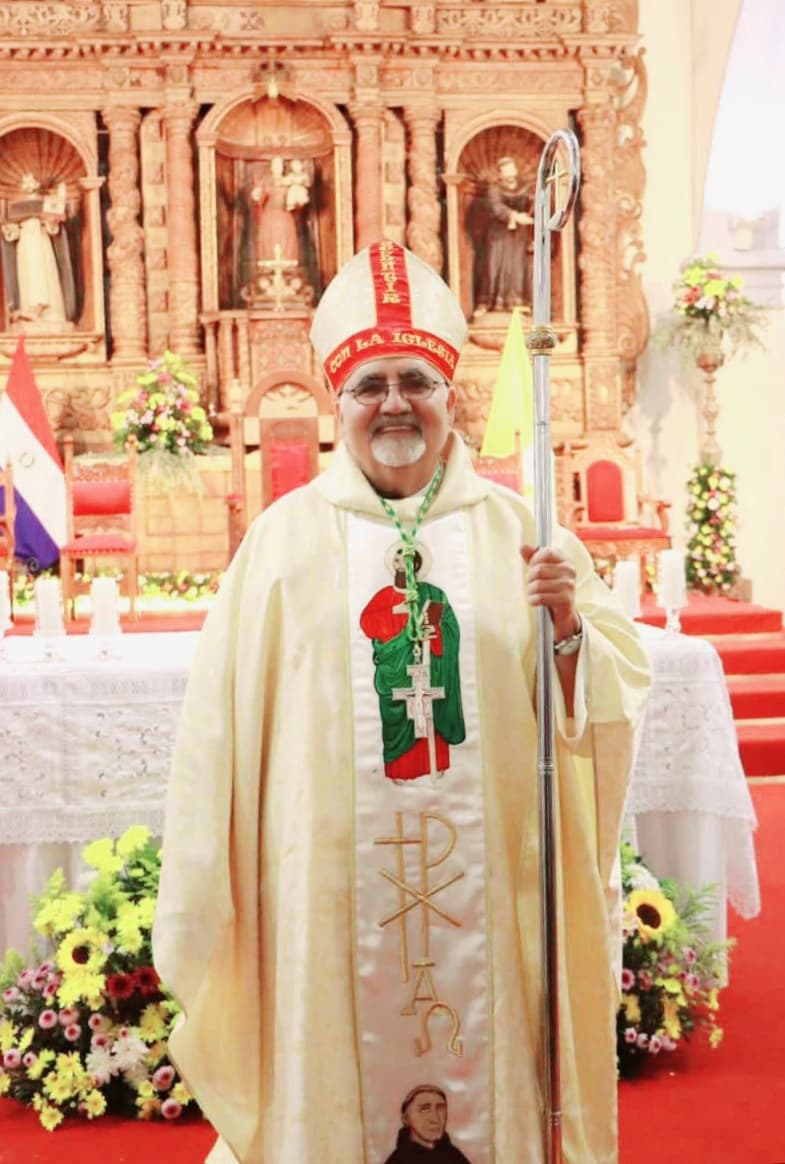

Marcelo Benítez Martínez (born 6 September 1956) is a Paraguayan Roman Catholic prelate who has been the bishop of the Roman Catholic Diocese of Caazapá since 2025.
