= Pastor Cuquejo =

Paraguayan priest (1939–2023)

His Excellency Pastor Cuquejo
- Archbishop Emeritus of Asunción
- Appointed: 15 June 2002
- Term ended: 6 November 2014
- Predecessor: Felipe Santiago Benítez Ávalos
- Successor: Edmundo Ponziano Valenzuela Mellid
- Previous posts: Auxiliary Bishop of Asunción and Titular Bishop of Budua (1982–1990); Prelate of Alto Paraná and Military Bishop of Paraguay (1990–1992); Titular Bishop of Aufinium (1992–1998)

Orders
- Ordination: 21 June 1964
- Consecration: 15 August 1982 by Ismael Blas Rolón Silvero

Personal details
- Born: 20 September 1939 San Estanislao, Paraguay
- Died: 22 August 2023 (aged 83)

Eustaquio Pastor Cuquejo Verga C.Ss.R. (20 September 1939 – 22 August 2023) was a Paraguayan Roman Catholic prelate who was the Archbishop of the Roman Catholic Archdiocese of Asunción.

== Biography ==
Cuquejo was born on San Estanislao on 20 September 1939. He joined the Congregation of the Most Holy Redeemer in 1957. From 1959 to 1964 he studied theology and philosophy at the Redemptorist priest's seminar in Esopus, New York. There he received his holy orders on 21 June 1964. He then studied pastoral psychology in Annapolis, Maryland. After a short time as a vicar in Paraguay, he became professor and apostolic prefect at the seminar of the Redemptorists in Ponta Grossa, Brazil on 21 July 1968, and from 1973 professor of moral theology at the Theologicum de Curitiba. From 1975 to 1977, he completed a postgraduate degree in Moral Theology at the Academia Alfonsiana in Rome, belonging to the Pontifical Lateran University.

On 6 January 1978, he was elected provincial superior of the Redemptorists in Paraguay; in 1981 he was re-elected. From 1978 to 1982 he was vice president of the Confederación de Religiosos del Paraguay, and from 1981 he was president of the Conferencia de Puebla.

In 1982, he was appointed Bishop of Budua by Pope John Paul II and appointed as auxiliary bishop in Asunción. The Archbishop of Asunción, Ismael Rolón Silvero gave him his holy orders in the Metropolitan Cathedral on 15 August 1982; co-consecrators were the then Auxiliary Bishop of Asunción Jorge Adolfo, Carlos Livieres Banks, and Aloísio Ariovaldo (Tarcísio) Amaral, then Bishop of Limeira, São Paulo.

In 1983, he was elected to the Permanent Council of the Paraguayan Episcopal Conference, became Chairman of the Economic Committee of the CEP from 1984, and became a member of the Congregación para los Religiosos y los Institutos Seculares in 1986. In 1986–1987 he was chairman of the CEP for the second National Eucharistic Congress and the visit of John Paul II to Paraguay. In 1987, he became a member of the Latin American Episcopal Conference (CELAM), and from 1991 he was chairman of the Education Commission.

In 1989, he was elected administrator of the Archbishopric of Asunción "ad interim", shortly thereafter in 1990 to prelate the Roman Catholic Diocese of Ciudad del Este. In 1992, John Paul II appointed him titular bishop of Aufinium and appointed him to the Military Ordinariate of Paraguay during the presidency of Andrés Rodríguez. During the annual CEP 1994, he was elected CEP General Secretary. In November of that same year, Pope John Paul II appointed him Apostolic Administrator of Caacupé. In 2000, he was appointed Bishop and Apostolic Administrator of Alto Paraná.

In 2002 he was appointed Archbishop of the Archdiocese of Asunción. Since 2002 he was Vice-President of the Paraguayan Episcopal Conference.

Cuquejo was considered as a potential cardinal for a time; had he been selected, he would have been the first Paraguayan cardinal. His suffragan bishop, Rogelio Livieres Plano publicly claimed in 2014 that Cuquejo was homosexual, which caused a scandal in Paraguay. As a result, a visitation to Livieres Plano's diocese was arranged, and Livieres Plano was expelled from office by Pope Francis.

In November 2014, Cuquejo resigned as archbishop of the Archdiocese of Asunción due to age, and Pope Francis appointed Edmundo Valenzuela as the new archbishop on 6 November.

Pastor Cuquejo died on 22 August 2023, at the age of 83.

Catholic Church titles
| Preceded by Felipe Santiago Benítez Ávalos | Archbishop of Asunción; 2002–2014 | Succeeded by Edmundo Ponziano Valenzuela Mellid |
| Preceded by Juan Moleón Andreu | Military Bishop of Paraguay; 1992–2002 | Succeeded by Ricardo Jorge Valenzuela Rios |
| Preceded by Luis Héctor Villalba | Titular Bishop of Aufinium; 1992–1998 | Succeeded by José Luis Redrado Marchite |
| Preceded by Augustín Van Aaken | Prelate of Alto Paraná; 1990–1992 | Succeeded by Oscar Páez Garcete |
| Preceded by Ruben Tolentino Profugo | Titular Bishop of Budua; 1982–1990 | Succeeded by Fabio de Jesús Morales Grisales |
| Preceded by — | Auxiliary Bishop of Asunción; 1982–1990 | Succeeded by — |
