= Adalberto Martínez Flores =

Paraguayan Catholic archbishop (born 1951)

His Eminence Adalberto Martínez Flores
- Cardinal, Archbishop of Asunción
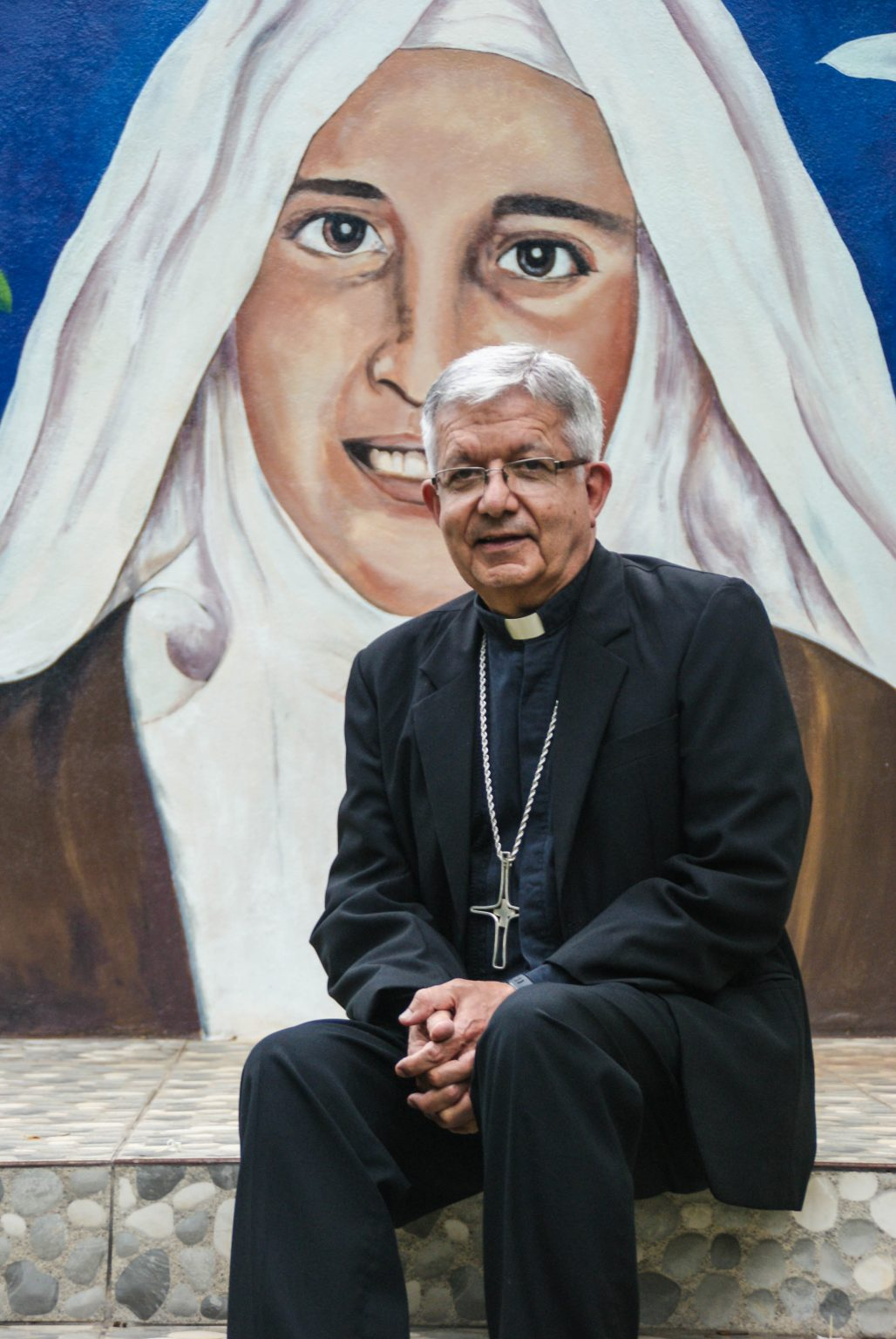
- Church: Catholic Church
- Archdiocese: Asunción
- Appointed: 17 February 2022
- Installed: 6 March 2022
- Predecessor: Edmundo Ponziano Valenzuela Mellid
- Other posts: President of the Paraguayan Episcopal Conference (2018-); Apostolic Administrator of the Military Ordinariate of Paraguay (2018-)
- Previous posts: Titular Bishop of Tatilti (1997-2000); Auxiliary Bishop of Asunción (1997-2000); Bishop of San Lorenzo (2000-07); Bishop of San Pedro (2007-12); General Secretary of the Paraguayan Episcopal Conference (2011-15); Military Ordinary of Paraguay (2012-18); Bishop of Villarrica (2018-22)

Orders
- Ordination: 24 August 1985 by Seán Patrick O'Malley
- Consecration: 8 November 1997 by Felipe Santiago Benítez Ávalos
- Created cardinal: 27 August 2022 by Francis
- Rank: Cardinal Priest

Personal details
- Born: Adalberto Martínez Flores; 8 July 1951 (age 75) Asunción, Paraguay
- Education: Universidad Nacional de Asunción; Pontifical Lateran University
- Motto: Ut omnes unum sint ("That they may all be one")
- Coat of arms

Adalberto Martínez Flores (born 8 July 1951) is a Paraguayan Catholic prelate who has served as Archbishop of Asunción since 2022. He has been a bishop since 1997. Flores became the first Paraguayan cardinal in 2022, in a consistory led by Pope Francis.

== Biography ==
Adalberto Martínez Flores was born in Asunción, Paraguay, on 8 July 1951. He studied economics at the National University of Asunción for three years and then studied advanced English in Washington, D.C., and then philosophy at Oblate College in San Antonio, Texas. In 1977, he moved to Frascati to study at the International School for Priests of the Focolare Movement. He completed his studies in philosophy and theology at the Pontifical Lateran University in 1981. He was ordained a priest on 24 August 1985 by Seán O'Malley, then bishop coadjutor of St. Thomas.

He served as priestly minister in the Diocese of Saint Thomas in the U.S. Virgin Islands from 1985 to 1994, first on St. Croix and then on St. Thomas. He was then incardinated in the Archdiocese of Asunción in 1994, he was parish priest of the Sacred Hearts of Jesus and Mary parish from 1994 to 1997.

On 14 August 1997, Pope John Paul II appointed him as an auxiliary bishop of Asunción. He received his episcopal consecration on 8 November from Felipe Santiago Benitez Avalos, Archbishop of Asunción.

On 18 May 2000, he was appointed the first bishop of the new Diocese of San Lorenzo. On 19 February 2007, he was transferred to the Diocese of San Pedro and on 14 March 2012 appointed to the Military Ordinariate of Paraguay. On 23 July 2018, he was transferred to Villarrica del Espíritu Santo while continuing as apostolic administrator of the Military Ordinariate. In November 2018, he was elected to a three-year term as president of the Episcopal Conference of Paraguay and he was elected to another term in November 2021.

On 17 February 2022, Pope Francis appointed him Archbishop of Asunción.

On 27 August 2022, Pope Francis made him a cardinal priest, assigning him the title of San Giovanni a Porta Latina. He participated as a cardinal elector in the 2025 papal conclave that elected Pope Leo XIV.

== See also ==
- Cardinals created by Pope Francis

Catholic Church titles
Preceded by Renato Corti	Cardinal-Priest of San Giovanni a Porta Latina; 27 August 2022—Present	Succeeded by Incumbent
