= Leticia Gonzalez (politician) =

Welsh politician

Leticia Gonzalez MS
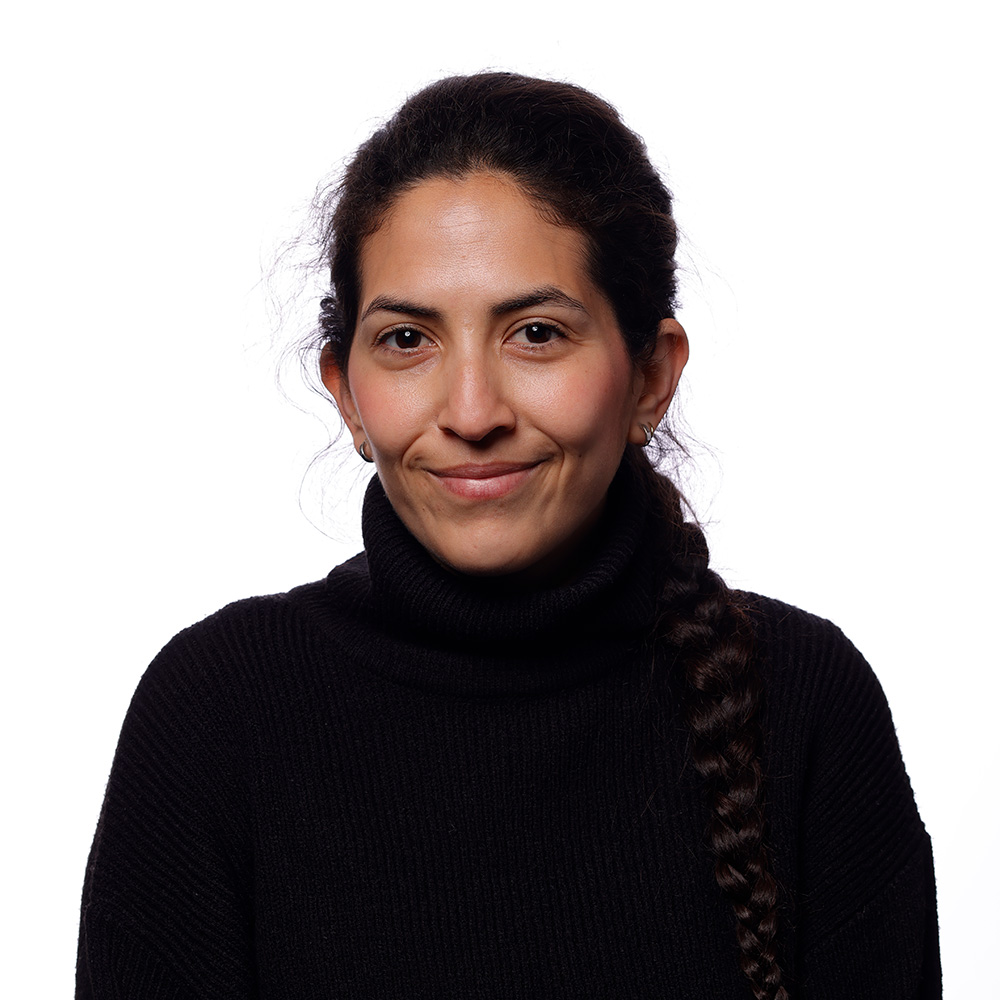
- Official portrait, 2026

Member of the Senedd for Caerdydd Penarth
- Incumbent
- Assumed office 8 May 2026
- Preceded by: Constituency established

Personal details
- Born: Leticia Andrea Gonzalez Estigarribia; 1989 or 1990 (age 36–37) Buenos Aires, Argentina
- Party: Plaid Cymru

Leticia Andrea Gonzalez Estigarribia (Note: In this Hispanic American name, the first or paternal surname is Gonzalez and the second or maternal family name is Estigarribia.) (born 1989 or 1990) is an Argentinian-Welsh politician for Plaid Cymru, representing Caerdydd Penarth in the Welsh Senedd.

== Political career ==
Gonzalez fought and lost a 2024 by-election to the Cardiff Council division of Splott, coming in 6th place with 88 votes. In the 7 May 2026 election to the Senedd, she was placed third on Plaid Cymru's list for the Caerdydd Penarth constituency. With Plaid taking three of the constituency's six seats with 41.0% of the vote, she was elected. As a result, she became the first Senedd member from South America.

== Personal life ==
Gonzalez was born in Buenos Aires, Argentina, and moved to London age 27. At the time of her election to the Senedd, she had lived in Cardiff for eight years and was a resident of its Riverside district.
