= Julián de Cortázar =

Spanish-born prelate

The Most Reverend Julián de Cortázar
- Archbishop of Santafé en Nueva Granada
- Church: Catholic Church
- Archdiocese: Santafé en Nueva Granada
- Appointed: 7 April 1625
- Installed: 4 July 1627
- Term ended: 16 October 1630
- Predecessor: Hernando de Arias y Ugarte
- Successor: Bernardino de Almansa Carrión
- Previous post: Bishop of Córdoba (1618–1627)

Orders
- Consecration: 25 December 1618 by Lorenzo Pérez de Grado

Personal details
- Born: 15 January 1576 Durango, Biscay, Spain
- Died: 31 October 1630 (aged 54) Bogotá, Viceroyalty of Peru
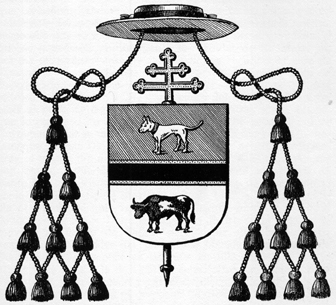
- Coat of arms

Julián de Cortázar y Carrillo (15 January 1576 – 31 October 1630) was a Spanish-born prelate of the Catholic Church in the part of New Spain that is now Colombia. From 1618 to 1627 he served as Bishop of Córdoba in Argentina, and from 1627 to 1630 as Archbishop of Santafé en Nueva Granada in New Spain.

== Biography ==
Julián de Cortázar y Carrillo was born on 15 January 1576 in Durango, Biscay, Spain. His father was Juan Martínez de Cortázar.

=== Education and priesthood ===
Cortázar graduated from the University of Oñati, and then taught theology there. He later worked as a professor at the Colegio de Santa Cruz in Valladolid, Castile, and later was the canon of Santo Domingo de la Calzada.

=== Bishop of Córdoba ===
In 1617, King Philip III of Spain proposed Cortázar to be Bishop of Córdoba, and Pope Paul V appointed him on 10 April 1617. He immediately sailed to the Argentina, landing in Buenos Aires in March 1618. He then traveled to Asunción, Paraguay, where he was consecrated as bishop by Bishop Lorenzo Pérez de Grado, Bishop of Paraguay. He then returned to Argentina, beginning his term as bishop with a pastoral visit to many of the cities in his diocese.

Cortázar arrived on 28 September 1617 in Santiago del Estero, the seat of the diocese, where he found the cathedral destroyed by fire and only half rebuilt. He spent the first few years of his episcopacy there, rebuilding the cathedral and correcting certain customs of the local clergy. He then moved on to Córdoba, the namesake of the diocese, where he helped develop the recently founded Jesuit-run University of Córdoba. In March 1620, back in Santiago de Estero, Cortázar was the principal consecrator of Pedro Carranza Salinas, the first bishop of Buenos Aires.

In 1620, Cortázar continued his pastoral trip throughout his diocese, visiting La Rioja, Londres, San Miguel de Tucumán. During a visit to Calchaquí Valleys, the presence of an armed escort with Cortázar alarmed indigenous people, causing them to flee and refuse to meet with him. From there, he visited Salta, San Salvador de Jujuy, and Nuestra Señora de Talavera. He returned to Santiago de Estero in 1621. In the capital, he founded a seminary for the diocese and entrusted its administration to the Society of Jesus.

Throughout his tenure as bishop, Cortázar came into frequent conflict with the governor of Tucumán Province, Juan Alonso de Vera y Zárate, with it once reaching the extent of Cortázar excommunicating him for several weeks.

=== Archbishop of Bogotá ===
On 9 January 1625, King Philip IV of Spain presented Cortázar to be Archbishop of Santafé in Nueva Granada (now the Archdiocese of Bogotá), and Pope Urban VIII appointed him on 7 April of that year. He traveled through Peru and arrived in Bogotá on 4 July 1627, and was installed as archbishop that day. As archbishop, Cortázar expanded the episcopal palace and made a pastoral trip throughout part of the archdiocese.

After three years as archbishop, Cortázar died in Bogotá on 31 October 1630, at the age of 54. He was buried in the Bogotá Cathedral. His legacy includes a street in Córdoba, Argentina, that bears his name.

== Episcopal lineage ==
- Bishop Agustín de Carvajal, OSA
- Bishop Lorenzo Pérez de Grado (1616)
- Archbishop Julián de Cortázar (1618)

== External links and additional sources ==
- Cheney, David M. "Archdiocese of Bogotá". Catholic-Hierarchy.org. (for Chronology of Bishops) ^{[self-published]}
- Chow, Gabriel. "Metropolitan Archdiocese of Bogotá (Colombia)". GCatholic.org. (for Chronology of Bishops) ^{[self-published]}
