= Jerome Arthur Pechillo =

Catholic bishop (1919–1991)

Most Reverend Jerome A. Pechillo, T.O.R.
- Auxiliary Bishop of Newark
- Church: Catholic Church
- See: Titular See of Nova Sparsa
- Appointed: March 6, 1976
- In office: March 6, 1976 - January 1, 1991
- Previous post: Prelate of Coronel Oviedo (1961-1976)

Orders
- Ordination: June 10, 1941
- Consecration: January 25, 1966 by Joseph Carroll McCormick

Personal details
- Born: May 16, 1919 Brooklyn, New York
- Died: January 1, 1991 (aged 71)

Jerome Arthur Pechillo, T.O.R. (May 16, 1919 – January 1, 1991) was an American missionary and bishop of the Catholic Church. He served as the Prelate of Coronel Oviedo in Paraguay from 1961 to 1976, and auxiliary bishop of the Archdiocese of Newark from 1976 to 1991.

== Biography ==
Born in Brooklyn, New York, Pechillo was ordained a priest for the Third Order Regular of St. Francis of Penance on June 10, 1941. He was named the Prelate of Coronel Oviedo, Paraguay on September 10, 1961. Pechillo attended three of the four sessions of the Second Vatican Council (1962-1965).

While remaining prelate of Coronel Oviedo, Pope Paul VI appointed him as the Titular Bishop of Nova Sparsa on October 20, 1965. He was consecrated by Bishop Joseph McCormick of Altoona-Johnstown on January 25, 1966. The principal co-consecrators were Bishop Anthony Mussio of Steubenville and Brooklyn Auxiliary Bishop John Boardman.

Pope Paul named him the Auxiliary Bishop of Newark, in the U.S., on March 6, 1976. Pechillo continued to serve as an auxiliary bishop until his death at the age of 71 on January 1, 1991.
