= Boreum, Cyrenaica =

See Boreum for namesakes

Boreum was a city and diocese in Roman Libya. Its Greek name is Boreion or Borion (Βόρειον). It is now a Roman Catholic titular see.

There were two sites with this name, which contributed to some confusion regarding their identification. One was mentioned by Pliny (Natural History 5.28–29), who placed the western border of Cyrenaica at the northern Borion, located at Ra's Tāwīnis (Ras Taiunes, Ras Teyonas) in northeastern Libya, today the place of a modern port of Al Mressa (Muraysaa, Murisi, رصيف المريسى), approximately 23 km SW of Benghazi, next to the village and resort of Al Nakhil (al-Nakheel). It seems that in antiquity this place never had any permanent settlement in the form of a village or fort.

The second Boreum is situated some 160 km to the south of Ra's Tāwīnis. The identity of this southern Boreum, a city of some importance in late antiquity, was conclusively established by Richard Goodchild in 1951. Its exact site is Bu Grada, 12 km NE of Old Brega (Marsa al-Brayqah), just SW of New Brega. Some early explorers (F.W. and H.W. Beechey, Heinrich Barth) mentioned the location as Tabilba or Tabilbê. The site has not been excavated, but several remains are clearly visible between its two harbors, like a wall with a moat, a pier, a tunnel from the citadel to the eastern harbor, rock chambers, and a large structure that has been called "bastion".

== History ==
Boreum was important enough in the Roman province of Libya Superior (Libya Pentapolitana; part of Cyrenaica) to become one of the suffragan sees in this province, which depended directly on the Patriarchate of Alexandria (in Egypt) without a proper Metropolitan, but faded like most bishoprics in Roman Africa. Only one ancient bishop is known, the Arian bishop Sentianus, mentioned in 325.

In the 5th century, Sozomen (Ecclesiastical History, II, 3) quotes Boreion as the westernmost place in the African regions that were subject to Constantinople.

According to Procopius (Περὶ Κτισμάτων / Buildings 6.2), the city had been exempt from taxation since time immemorial. He says Boreion had temples dedicated to Amun, and to Alexander of Macedon, but the Emperor Justinian I converted all the citizens to Christianity, built them a church of the Virgin, and enclosed the city with a very strong rampart. Justinian compelled the ancient Jewish community of Boreion to become Christian and turned their temple, that was claimed to be built by the King Solomon, into church. Shimon Applebaum assumes that, regardless of the term used by Procopius, this was an ordinary synagogue, unlike the temple in Elephantine.

== Titular see ==
In 1933 the diocese was nominally restored as a Latin titular bishopric of Boreum (Latin) / Borien(sis) (Latin adjective) / Boreo (Curiate Italian).

It is vacant, having had only these incumbents, all of the fitting Episcopal (lowest) rank:

- Louis-Joseph-Ephrem Groshenry, Society of African Missions [S.M.A.) (1937.06.17 – death 1962.05.18) as first Apostolic Vicar of Bobo-Dioulasso (Burkina Faso, then French Upper Volta) (1937.06.17 – 1941.05.15) and as emeritate
- Sinforiano Lucas Rojo, Missionary Oblates of Mary Immaculate (O.M.I.) (1962.08.24 – death 1990.05.04) as Apostolic Vicar of Pilcomayo (Paraguay) (1962.08.24 – 1981.01.24) and as emeritate.

== See also ==
- List of Catholic dioceses in Libya

== Sources and external links ==
- GCatholic - data for all sections
- Applebaum, Shimon. Jews and Greeks in Ancient Cyrene. Leiden: E. J. Brill, 1979.
- Beechey, F.W. and H.W.: Proceedings of the Expedition to Explore the Northern Coast of Africa: From Tripoly Eastward; in MDCCCXXI. and MDCCCXXII., Comprehending an Account of the Greater Syrtis and Cyrenaica; and of the Ancient Cities Composing the Pentapolis. London: J. Murray, 1828.
- Goodchild, Richard George (1951). "Boreum of Cyrenaica". Journal of Roman Studies 41. Pp. 11–16.
- Goodchild, Richard George: Libyan studies: select papers of the late R. G. Goodchild. Edited by J. Reynolds. London: P. Elek, 1976.
- Lendering, Jona: Boreum (Bu Grada)
- Procopius. On Buildings. General Index. Translated by H. B. Dewing, Glanville Downey. Loeb Classical Library 343. Cambridge, MA: Harvard University Press, 1940.
- Ruprechtsberger, Erwin. Die römische Limeszone in Tripolitanien und der Kyrenaika, Tunesien - Libyen. Aalen: Limes Museum, 1993.
- Sheldrick, Nichole. Building the Countryside: Rural Architecture and Settlement in Tripolitania during the Roman and Late Antique Periods. London: Society for Libyan Studies, 2021.
