= Diocese of San Juan Bautista de las Misiones =

Roman Catholic diocese in Paraguay

Diocese of San Juan Bautista de las Misiones Dioecesis Sancti Ioannis Baptistae a Missionibus

Catholic

Location
- Country: Paraguay
- Metropolitan: Asunción

Statistics
- Area: 21,703 km^{2} (8,380 sq mi)
- Population: Total; Catholics: (as of 2004); 201,000; 198,000 (98.5%)

Information
- Rite: Latin Rite

Current leadership
- Pope: Leo XIV
- Bishop: Osmar López Benítez
- Bishops emeritus: Mario Melanio Medina; Pedro Collar

Map

The Roman Catholic Diocese of San Juan Bautista (de las Misiones) (Latin: Dioecesis Sancti Ioannis Baptistae a Missionibus) is a southern suffragan Latin Catholic diocese in the ecclesiastical province of Asunción, which covers all of Paraguay (except the pre-diocesan missions).

== History ==
- On January 19, 1957, the Diocese of San Juan Bautista (de Las Misiones) was established on territories split off from the Metropolitan Archdiocese of Asunción and from the Diocese of Villarrica.

== Special churches ==
Its cathedral episcopal see is Catedral San Juan Bautista, dedicated to John the Baptist, in the city of San Juan Bautista de las Misiones in Misiones Department

It also has a Minor Basilica : the Marian Basílica Nuestra Señora del Pilar, dedicated to Our Lady of Pilar, in Pilar, Paraguay, Ñeembucu.

== Statistics ==
As per 2014, it pastorally served 227,000 Catholics (98.3% of 231,000 total) on 21,700 km^{2} in 30 parishes and 139 missions with 35 priests (19 diocesan, 16 religious), 2 deacons, 63 lay religious (18 brothers, 45 sisters) and 5 seminarians.

== Leadership ==
No.	Name	Episcopacy
1	Ramón Bogarín Argaña (1911–1976)	19 January 1957 – 3 September 1973
2	Carlos Milcíades Villaba (1924–2016)	25 July 1978 – 22 July 1999
3	Mario Melanio Medina (Note: Coadjutor bishop from 1997 to 1999.) (b. 1939)	22 July 1999 – 16 February 2017
4	Pedro Collar (b. 1963)	21 January 1957 – 19 December 2023
5	Osmar López Benítez (b. 1975)	5 May 2025 – Incumbent

== See also ==
- List of Catholic dioceses in Paraguay
