= Bo-reum =

- Hangul: 보름
- RR: Boreum
- MR: Porŭm
- IPA: [poɾɯm]

Bo-reum is a Korean given name. The word itself is a native Korean word meaning "half-month", "two weeks", "fortnight" and "fifteen days" and does not have corresponding hanja. However, since Korean given names can be created arbitrarily, it may also be a name with hanja (e.g. 普凜).

== People ==
People with this name include:

- Han Bo-reum (born 1987), South Korean actress and model
- Kim Bo-reum (born 1993), South Korean speed skater

== Fictional characters ==
Fictional characters with this name include:

- Yoon Bo-reum, in the 2017 South Korean television series Confession Couple

== See also ==
- List of Korean given names
