= Jorge Adolfo Carlos Livieres Banks =

Paraguayan Roman Catholic bishop (1929–2018)

Jorge Adolfo Carlos Livieres Banks (22 February 1929 – 17 December 2018) was a Paraguayan Roman Catholic bishop.

== Biography ==
Livieres Banks was born in Paraguay and was ordained to the priesthood in 1956. He served as titular bishop of Utimmira and as auxiliary bishop of the Roman Catholic Archdiocese of Asunción, Paraguay, from 1976 to 1987. He then served as bishop of the Territorial Prelature of Encaranación from 1987 to 1990 and as bishop of the Roman Catholic Diocese of Encarnación, Paraguay, from 1990 to 2003.
