= Diocese of Ciudad del Este =

Roman Catholic diocese in Paraguay

Coordinates: 25.5179°S 54.6079°W

Diocese of Ciudad del Este Dioecesis Urbis Orientalis

Catholic

Location
- Country: Paraguay
- Metropolitan: Asunción

Statistics
- Area: 27,451 km^{2} (10,599 sq mi)
- Population: Total; Catholics: (as of 2004); 600,100; 500,000 (83.3%)

Information
- Sui iuris church: Latin Church
- Rite: Roman Rite
- Cathedral: Catedral San Blas

Current leadership
- Pope: Leo XIV
- Bishop: Pedro Collar

The Roman Catholic Diocese of Ciudad del Este (Latin: Dioecesis Urbis Orientalis) is a diocese of the Roman Catholic Church based in the city of Ciudad del Este, in the Ecclesiastical Province of Asunción in Paraguay.

== History ==
On March 25, 1968, the Territorial Prelature of Alto Paraná was established from the Territorial Prelature of Encarnación y Alto Paraná.

On July 10, 1993, the territorial prelature was established as the Diocese of Alto Paraná.

On February 3, 2001, the diocese as renamed as the Diocese of Ciudad del Este.

On February 10, 2024, the diocese lost territory to form the Diocese of Canindeyú.

In 2014, Pope Francis dismissed the diocese's bishop, Rogelio Ricardo Livieres Plano, due to Livieres's alleged promotion of a diocesan priest who had been accused of the sexual abuse of a minor while serving in the United States. Livieres was then barred from presiding at public celebrations of the Mass. Since then, accusations of major financial mismanagement of the finances of the diocese by Livieres have also surfaced, with the diocese reportedly close to a million United States dollars in debt.

== Leadership ==
| No. | Name | Episcopacy |
|---|---|---|
| 1 | Francisco Cedzich (Note: As bishop-prelate of the Territorial Prelate of Alto Paraná.) (1911–1971) | 11 May 1968 – 23 December 1971 |
| 2 | Agustín Van Aaken (Note: As bishop-prelate of the Territorial Prelate of Alto Paraná.) (1914–1990) | 25 July 1972 – 19 April 1990 |
| 3 | Pastor Cuquejo (Note: As bishop-prelate of the Territorial Prelate of Alto Paraná.) (1939–2023) | 19 April 1990 – 5 May 1992 |
| 4 | Oscar Páez (1937–2016) | 10 July 1993 – 5 February 2000 |
| 5 | Ignacio Gogorza (b. 1936) | 3 February 2001 – 12 July 2004 |
| 6 | Rogelio Livieres (1945–2015) | 12 July 2004 – 25 September 2014 |
| 7 | Wilhelm Steckling (b. 1947) | 15 November 2014 – 3 February 2024 |
| 8 | Pedro Collar (Note: Auxiliary bishop from 2016 to 2017) (b. 1963) | 3 February 2024 – Incumbent |
