= Diocese of Encarnación =

Roman Catholic diocese in Paraguay

Coordinates: 27.3391°S 55.8672°W

Diocese of Encarnación Dioecesis Sanctissimae Incarnationis

Catholic

Location
- Country: Paraguay
- Metropolitan: Asunción

Statistics
- Area: 16,525 km^{2} (6,380 sq mi)
- Population: Total; Catholics: (as of 2006); 546,000; 441,000 (80.8%)

Information
- Rite: Latin Rite

Current leadership
- Pope: Leo XIV
- Bishop: Francisco Javier Pistilli Scorzara, P. Schönstatt
- Bishops emeritus: Ignacio Gogorza Izaguirre, S.C.I. Claudio Silvero Acosta, S.C.I.

Map

The Roman Catholic Diocese of Encarnación (Latin: Dioecesis Sanctissimae Incarnationis) is a diocese located in the city of Encarnación in the ecclesiastical province of Asunción in Paraguay.

== History ==
- On 21 January 1957, the Territorial Prelature of Encarnación y Alto Paraná was established from the Diocese of Concepción and Diocese of Villarrica.
- On 25 March 1968, the territorial prelature was renamed as the Territorial Prelature of Encarnación.
- On 19 April 1990: Promoted as Diocese of Encarnación.

== Leadership ==
No.	Name	Episcopacy
1	Johannes Wiesen (Note: As bishop-prelate of the Territorial Prelate of Encarnación and Alto Paraná.) (1904–1972)	21 January 1957 – 11 May 1968
2	Juan Bockwinckel (Note: As bishop-prelate of the Territorial Prelate of Encarnación.) (1910–1999)	11 May 1968 – 24 July 1987
3	Jorge Livieres Banks (Note: As bishop-prelate of the Territorial Prelate of Encarnación until 19 April 1990.) (Note: Alongside Auxiliary Bishop Claudio Silvero Acosta from 1998 to 2014.) (1929–2018)	24 July 1987 – 5 July 2003
4	Ignacio Gogorza (Note: Alongside Auxiliary Bishop Claudio Silvero Acosta from 1998 to 2014.) (b. 1936)	12 July 2004 – 15 November 2014
5	Javier Pistilli (b. 1965)	15 November 2014 – Incumbent
