= Edmundo Valenzuela =

The Most Reverend Edmundo Valenzuela S.D.B.
- VI Archbishop (Emeritus) of Asunción; XXXVII Bishop of Paraguay
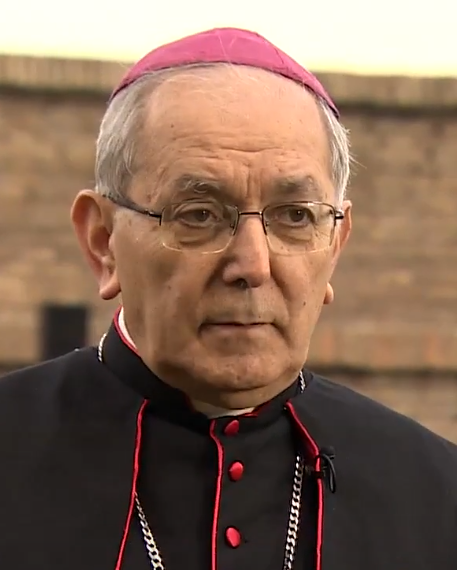
- Valenzuela in 2017
- Church: Roman Catholic Church
- Archdiocese: Asunción
- See: Asunción
- Appointed: 6 November 2014
- Predecessor: Eustaquio Pastor Cuquejo Verga
- Successor: Adalberto Martínez Flores
- Previous posts: Titular Bishop of Uzalis (2006-11); Vicar Apostolic of Chaco Paraguayo (2006-11); Vice-President of the Paraguayan Episcopal Conference (2011-15); Coadjutor Archbishop of Asunción (2011-14); President of the Paraguayan Episcopal Conference (2015-18)

Orders
- Ordination: 3 April 1971 by Antonio Samorè
- Consecration: 22 April 2006 by Eustaquio Pastor Cuquejo Verga

Personal details
- Born: Edmundo Ponziano Valenzuela Mellid; 19 November 1944 (age 81) Villarrica, Paraguay
- Education: Pontifical Salesian University
- Motto: Por Cristo al Padre en el Espíritu
- Coat of arms

Archbishop Edmundo Ponziano Valenzuela Mellid SDB (born 19 November 1944) is a Roman Catholic missionary who served in Paraguay as the sixth Metropolitan Archbishop of the Archdiocese of Asunción. On February 13, 2006, he was appointed by Pope Benedict XVI as Apostolic Vicar to Chaco Paraguayo, an area with a population of 18,000 but only 5 ordained priests. As a result of this appointment, he was consecrated to the episcopate 22 April 2006. Prior to this appointment, Valenzuela served as a high-profile missionary in Angola. Valenzuela was ordained a priest of the Salesians of Don Bosco in 1977.

Upon the resignation of Metropolitan Archbishop of the Archdiocese of Asunción Pastor Cuquejo due to age, Valenzuela, as Coadjutor, became the new Metropolitan Archbishop of Asunción on 6 November 2014, as the 44th bishop of Asunción and the 6th metropolitan archbishop. He received the archiepiscopal pallium from Pope Francis on 29 June 2015 at St. Peter's Basilica, Vatican City.

On 6 March 2022 he was succeeded by Adalberto Martínez Flores who became the VII Archbishop of Asunción and Valenzuela, after his resignation, became Archbishop Emeritus.
