= Casarrubuelos =

Municipality in Spain

Coordinates: 40°10′N 3°50′W

- Municipality
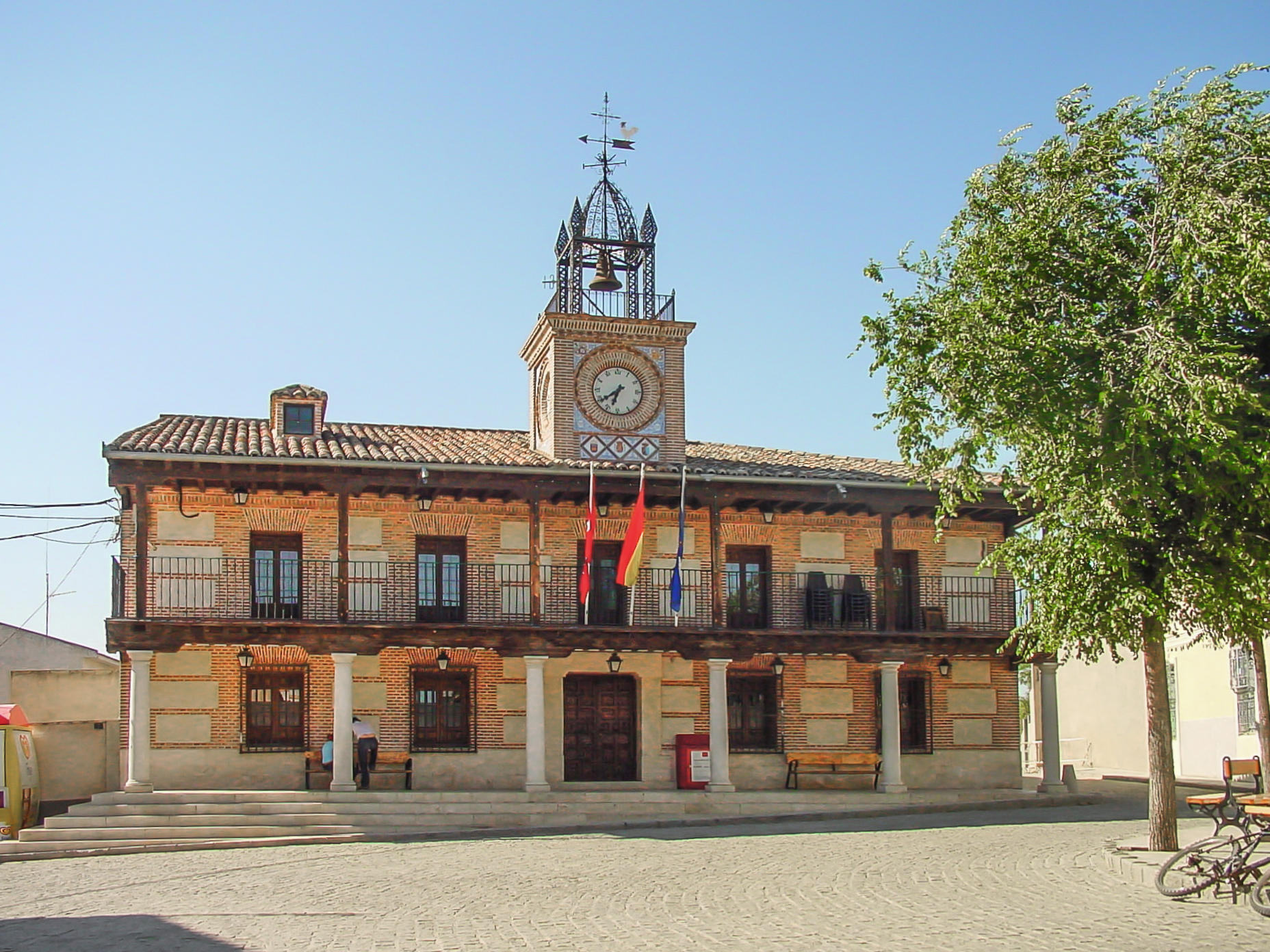
- Casarrubelos City Hall

- Flag Coat of arms

- Municipal location within the Community of Madrid.
- Country: Spain
- Autonomous community: Community of Madrid
- Elevation: 622 m (2,041 ft)

Population (2025-01-01)
  - Total: 4,323
- Time zone: UTC+1 (CET)
  - Summer (DST): UTC+2 (CEST)

Casarrubuelos (Spanish pronunciation: [kasaruˈβwelos]) is a municipality of the autonomous community of Madrid in central Spain. It belongs to the comarca of Comarca Sur.
