= Diocese of Benjamín Aceval =

Roman Catholic diocese in Paraguay

Coordinates: 24.9905°S 57.5541°W

Diocese of Benjamín Aceval Dioecesis Beniaminacevalensis

Catholic

Location
- Country: Paraguay
- Metropolitan: Asunción

Statistics
- Area: 44,000 km^{2} (17,000 sq mi)
- Population: Total; Catholics: (as of 2004); 83,100; 77,950 (93.8%)

Information
- Rite: Latin Rite

Current leadership
- Pope: Leo XIV
- Bishop: Amancio Benítez
- Bishops emeritus: Cándido Cárdenas

Map

The Roman Catholic Diocese of Benjamín Aceval (Latin: Dioecesis Beniaminacevalensis) is a diocese located in the city of Benjamín Aceval in the ecclesiastical province of Asunción in Paraguay.

== History ==
- On June 28, 1980 the Diocese of Benjamín Aceval was established from the Diocese of Concepción and Apostolic Vicariate of Pilcomayo

== Leadership ==
No.	Name	Episcopacy
1	Mario Melanio Medina (b. 1939)	28 June 1980 – 6 July 1998
2	Cándido Cárdenas Villalba (1941-2026)	6 July 1998 – 16 June 2018
3	Amancio Benítez (b. 1973)	16 June 2018 – Incumbent
