= Diocese of San Pedro =

Roman Catholic diocese in Paraguay

Diocese of San Pedro Dioecesis Sancti Petri Apostoli

Catholic

Location
- Country: Paraguay
- Metropolitan: Asunción

Statistics
- Area: 20,002 km^{2} (7,723 sq mi)
- Population: Total; Catholics: (as of 2004); 380,787; 350,000 (91.9%)

Information
- Rite: Latin Rite

Current leadership
- Pope: Leo XIV
- Bishop: Pierre Jubinville

Map

The Roman Catholic Diocese of San Pedro (Latin: Dioecesis Sancti Petri Apostoli) is a diocese located in the city of San Pedro in the ecclesiastical province of Asunción in Paraguay.

== History ==
- On 5 June 1978, the Diocese of San Pedro was established from the Diocese of Concepción.

== Leadership ==
No.	Name	Episcopacy
1	Oscar Páez (1937–2016)	5 June 1978 – 10 July 1993
2	Fernando Lugo (b. 1951)	5 March 1994 – 11 January 2005 (Note: Bishop Lugo requested laicization in 2005 to allow him to run for President of Paraguay. The Church at first refused, going so far as to suspend him as bishop when he ran for office anyway, but eventually granted lay status after he was elected.)
3	Adalberto Martínez (b. 1951)	19 February 2007 – 14 March 2012
4	Pierre Jubinville (b. 1960)	6 November 2013 – Incumbent
