= Pierre Jubinville =

Pierre Laurent Jubinville, CSSp
- Bishop of San Pedro
- Church: Roman Catholic Church
- Diocese: San Pedro, Paraguay
- Installed: December 21, 2013
- Predecessor: Adalberto Martínez Flores
- Previous posts: First General Assistant, Congregation of the Holy Spirit (2012–2013)

Orders
- Ordination: September 17, 1988
- Consecration: December 21, 2013

Personal details
- Born: August 5, 1960 (age 66) Ottawa, Ontario, Canada
- Denomination: Roman Catholic
- Education: Institut Catholique de Paris

Pierre Laurent Jubinville CSSp (born August 5, 1960, in Ottawa, Ontario) is a Canadian-born Paraguayan Roman Catholic bishop.

== Education ==
In 2012, he took courses in religious studies at the Institut Catholique de Paris.

== Career ==
=== Priesthood ===
Pierre was ordained and appointed as a priest by Bishop Roger Ebacher in 1988. Roger described Jubinville as a “very bright poet". He served in Mexico, then Lima, Paraguay. Since 2012 he has been in Rome as First General Assistant in the Congregation of the Holy Spirit.

=== As a Bishop ===
Jubinville was appointed bishop of the Roman Catholic Diocese of San Pedro, Paraguay on November 6, 2013.
