= Apostolic Vicariate of Chaco Paraguayo =

Latin Catholic ecclesiastical jurisdiction in Paraguay

Apostolic Vicariate of Chaco Paraguayo Apostolicus Vicariatus Ciachensis in Paraquaria Natione
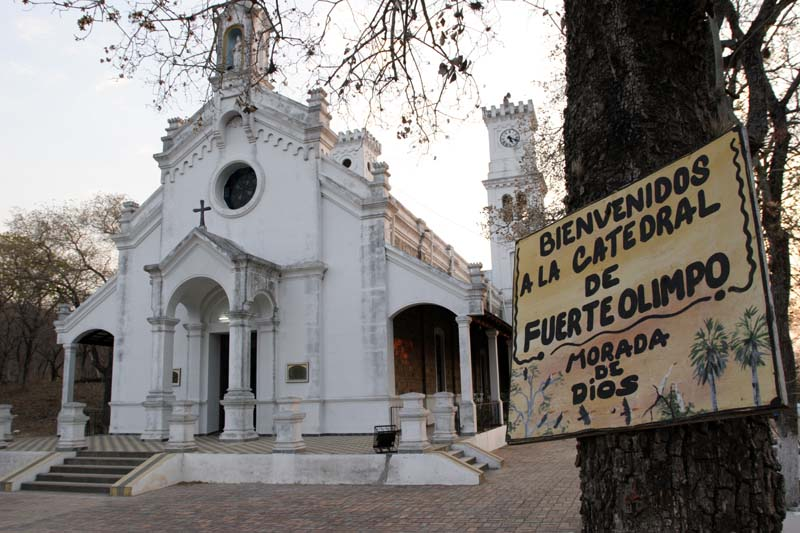
- Cathedral in Fuerte Olimpo

Location
- Country: Paraguay

Statistics
- Area: 96,300 km^{2} (37,200 sq mi)
- Population: Total; Catholics: (as of 2010); 27,000; 24,500 (90.7%)
- Parishes: 10

Information
- Denomination: Catholic Church
- Sui iuris church: Latin Church
- Rite: Roman Rite
- Established: 11 March 1948 (77 years ago)

Current leadership
- Pope: Francis
- Vicar Apostolic: Gabriel Narciso Escobar Ayala, SDB

Map

The Vicariate Apostolic of Chaco Paraguayo (Latin: Apostolicus Vicariatus Ciachensis in Paraquaria Natione) is a Latin Church ecclesiastical territory or apostolic vicariate of the Catholic Church located in the city of Fuerte Olimpo in Paraguay.

== History ==
On 11 March 1948, Pope Pius XII established the Vicariate Apostolic of Chaco Paraguayo from the Diocese of Concepción y Chaco.

== Ordinaries ==
1. Ángel Muzzolón, SDB † (11 March 1948 – 6 March 1969)
2. Alejo del Carmen Obelar Colman, SDB † (6 March 1969 – 13 September 1986)
3. Zacarías Ortiz Rolón, SDB (12 March 1988 – 12 July 2003), appointed Bishop of Concepción (Santissima Concezione) en Paraguay
4. Edmundo Valenzuela, SDB (13 February 2006 – 8 November 2011), appointed Coadjutor Archbishop of Asunción
5. Gabriel Narciso Escobar Ayala, SDB (18 June 2013 – )

== See also ==
- Roman Catholicism in Paraguay
