= Ergoiena =

Coordinates: 42.8753°N 2.02389°W

- Town
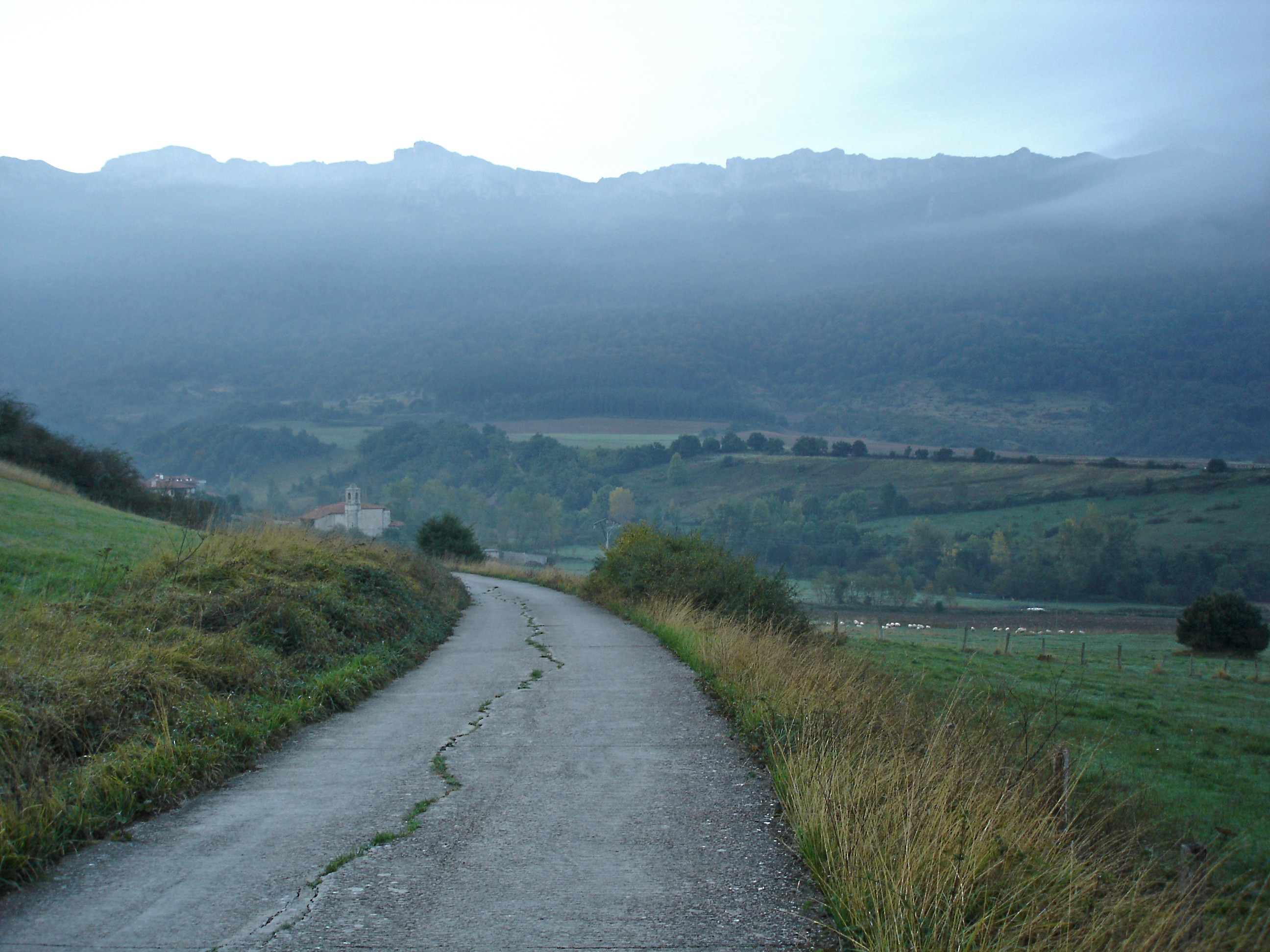
- Valley of Ergoiena

- Coat of arms

- Ergoiena, Navarra
- Country: Spain
- Province: Navarra

Population (2025-01-01)
  - Total: 392

Ergoiena is a municipality located in the province and autonomous community of Navarre, northern Spain. The Basque municipality numbers three villages, Lizarraga, Unanu and Dorrao. It bounds with the range Urbasa on the west and south, and with Andia on the east.
