= Celso Yegros Estigarribia =

- Bishop of Carapeguá
- Church: Catholic Church
- Diocese: Diocese of Carapeguá
- In office: 6 April 1983 – 10 July 2010
- Predecessor: Angel Nicolás Acha Duarte
- Successor: Joaquín Hermes Robledo Romero

Orders
- Ordination: 18 December 1960
- Consecration: 29 May 1983 by Ismael Rolón

Personal details
- Born: 11 July 1935 Itauguá, Central Department, Paraguay
- Died: 6 April 2013 (aged 77)

Celso Yegros Estigarribia (11 July 1935 – 6 April 2013) was the Roman Catholic bishop of the Roman Catholic Diocese of Carapequá, Paraguay.

Ordained to the priesthood in 1960, Yegros Estigarribia was named bishop in 1983 and retired in 2010.
