= Julio César Estigarribia =

Paraguayan footballer (born 1989)

Personal information
- Full name: Julio César Estigarribia
- Date of birth: 1 September 1989 (age 37)
- Place of birth: Asunción, Paraguay
- Height: 1.80 m (5 ft 11 in)
- Position: Midfielder

Senior career*
Years	Team	Apps	(Gls)
2009	Lota Schwager	19	(2)
2012	Salto del Guairá	–	(–)
2018	Capitán Troche	–	(–)
- * Club domestic league appearances and goals

Julio César Estigarribia is a Paraguayan former footballer who played as a midfielder.

== Club career ==
Born in Asunción, Paraguay, Estigarribia played as a midfielder for Chilean club Lota Schwager during 2009. He scored a game-winning goal in Lota Schwager's 2009 Copa Chile fourth round victory against Fernández Vial.

In his homeland, Estigarribia played for clubs such as Salto del Guairá and Capitán Troche.
