= Diocese of Carapeguá =

Roman Catholic diocese in Paraguay

Coordinates: 25.7670°S 57.2439°W

Diocese of Carapeguá Dioecesis Carapeguana

Catholic

Location
- Country: Paraguay
- Metropolitan: Asunción

Statistics
- Area: 8,705 km^{2} (3,361 sq mi)
- Population: Total; Catholics: (as of 2004); 226,514; 206,000 (90.9%)

Information
- Rite: Latin Rite

Current leadership
- Pope: Leo XIV
- Bishop: Celestino Ocampo

Map

The Roman Catholic Diocese of Carapeguá (Latin: Dioecesis Carapeguana) is a diocese located in the city of Carapeguá in the ecclesiastical province of Asunción in Paraguay.

== History ==
- On March 29, 1967, the Diocese of Carapeguá was established from the Diocese of Villarrica

== Bishops ==
| No. | Name | Episcopacy |
|---|---|---|
| 1 | Ángel Acha (1930–1982) | 5 June 1978 – 24 June 1982 |
| 2 | Celso Yegros (1935–2013) | 5 June 1983 – 9 July 2010 |
| 3 | Joaquín Robledo (Note: Coadjutor bishop from 2009 to 2010) (b. 1950) | 9 July 2010 – 4 July 2015 |
| 4 | Celestino Ocampo (b. 1961) | 16 June 2018 – Incumbent |
