= Diocese of Coronel Oviedo =

Roman Catholic diocese in Paraguay

Coordinates: 25.4467°S 56.4395°W

Diocese of Coronel Oviedo Dioecesis Oviedopolitana

Catholic

Location
- Country: Paraguay
- Metropolitan: Asunción

Statistics
- Area: 12,327 km^{2} (4,759 sq mi)
- Population: Total; Catholics: (as of 2004); 450,000; 412,000 (92.2%)

Information
- Rite: Latin Rite
- Cathedral: Catedral Nuestra Señora del Rosario

Current leadership
- Pope: Leo XIV
- Bishop: Juan Bautista Gavilán

Map

The Roman Catholic Diocese of Coronel Oviedo (Latin: Dioecesis Oviedopolitana) is a diocese located in the city of Coronel Oviedo in the ecclesiastical province of Asunción in Paraguay.

== History ==
- On September 10, 1961, the Territorial Prelature of Coronel Oviedo was established from the Diocese of Concepción.
- On March 6, 1976, the territorial prelature was promoted as the Diocese of Coronel Oviedo.

== Leadership ==
No.	Name	Episcopacy
1	Jerome Arthur Pechillo (Note: As bishop-prelate of the Territorial Prelate of Coronel Oviedo.) (1919–1991)	10 September 1961 – 6 March 1976
2	Claudio Silvero Acosta (b. 1935)	15 March 1976 – 26 March 1998
3	Ignacio Gogorza (b. 1936)	26 March 1998 – 3 February 2001
4	Juan Bautista Gavilán (b. 1951)	18 December 2001 – Incumbent
