= Oscar Páez Garcete =

Paraguayan Roman Catholic bishop

- Bishop of Alto Paraná
- Church: Catholic Church
- Diocese: Diocese of Alto Paraná
- In office: 10 July 1993 – 5 February 2000
- Predecessor: Pastor Cuquejo
- Successor: Ignacio Gogortza
- Previous post: Bishop of San Pedro (1978-1993)

Orders
- Ordination: 23 December 1961
- Consecration: 19 August 1978 by Joseph Mees

Personal details
- Born: 1 September 1937 Loreto, Concepción Department, Paraguay
- Died: 29 March 2016 (aged 78)

Oscar Páez Garcete (1 September 1937 – 29 March 2016) was a Roman Catholic bishop.

Ordained to the priesthood in 1961, Páez Garcete was named bishop of the Roman Catholic Diocese of San Pedro, Paraguay, in 1978. He was then named bishop of the Roman Catholic Diocese of Alto Paraná in 1998 and served as bishop until 2000.
