= Felipe Santiago Benítez Ávalos =

Catholic archbishop (1926–2009)

- Archbishop of Asunción
- Church: Catholic Church
- Archdiocese: Archdiocese of Asunción
- In office: 20 May 1989 – 15 June 2002
- Predecessor: Ismael Rolón
- Successor: Pastor Cuquejo
- Previous posts: Bishop of Villarrica (1965-1989); Titular Bishop of Chersonesus in Europa (1961-1965); Auxiliary Bishop of Asunción (1961-1965)

Orders
- Ordination: 7 June 1952
- Consecration: 24 September 1961 by Juan José Aníbal Mena Porta

Personal details
- Born: 21 May 1926 Piribebuy, Caraguatay Department, Paraguay
- Died: 19 March 2009 (aged 82) Asunción, Paraguay

Felipe Santiago Benítez Ávalos (1 May 1926 – 19 March 2009) was the Paraguayan Catholic Archbishop of the Archdiocese of Asuncion from his appointment on 20 May 1989, until his retirement on 12 June 2002.

Benítez Avalos was born in Piribebuy on 1 May 1926, to parents Angel del Rosario Benítez García and Juana Avalos Rodríguez.

He remained the Archbishop Emeritus until his death at the Hospital Universitario in Asunción on 19 March 2009, at the age of 82.
