= Mariscal Estigarribia (Asunción) =

- Barrio
- Interactive map of Mariscal Estigarribia
- Country: Paraguay
- Autonomous Capital District: Gran Asunción
- City: Asunción

Area
  - Total: 2.30 km^{2} (0.89 sq mi)
- Elevation: 43 m (141 ft)

Population
  - Total: 8,540

Mariscal Estigarribia is a neighbourhood (barrio) of Asunción, Paraguay. The suburb is the home of both the South Korea embassy and the honorary consulate of the Commonwealth of Australia.
