= Diocese of Villarrica del Espíritu Santo =

Roman Catholic diocese in Paraguay

Diocese of Villarrica del Espíritu Santo Dioecesis Villaricensis Spiritus Sancti

Catholic
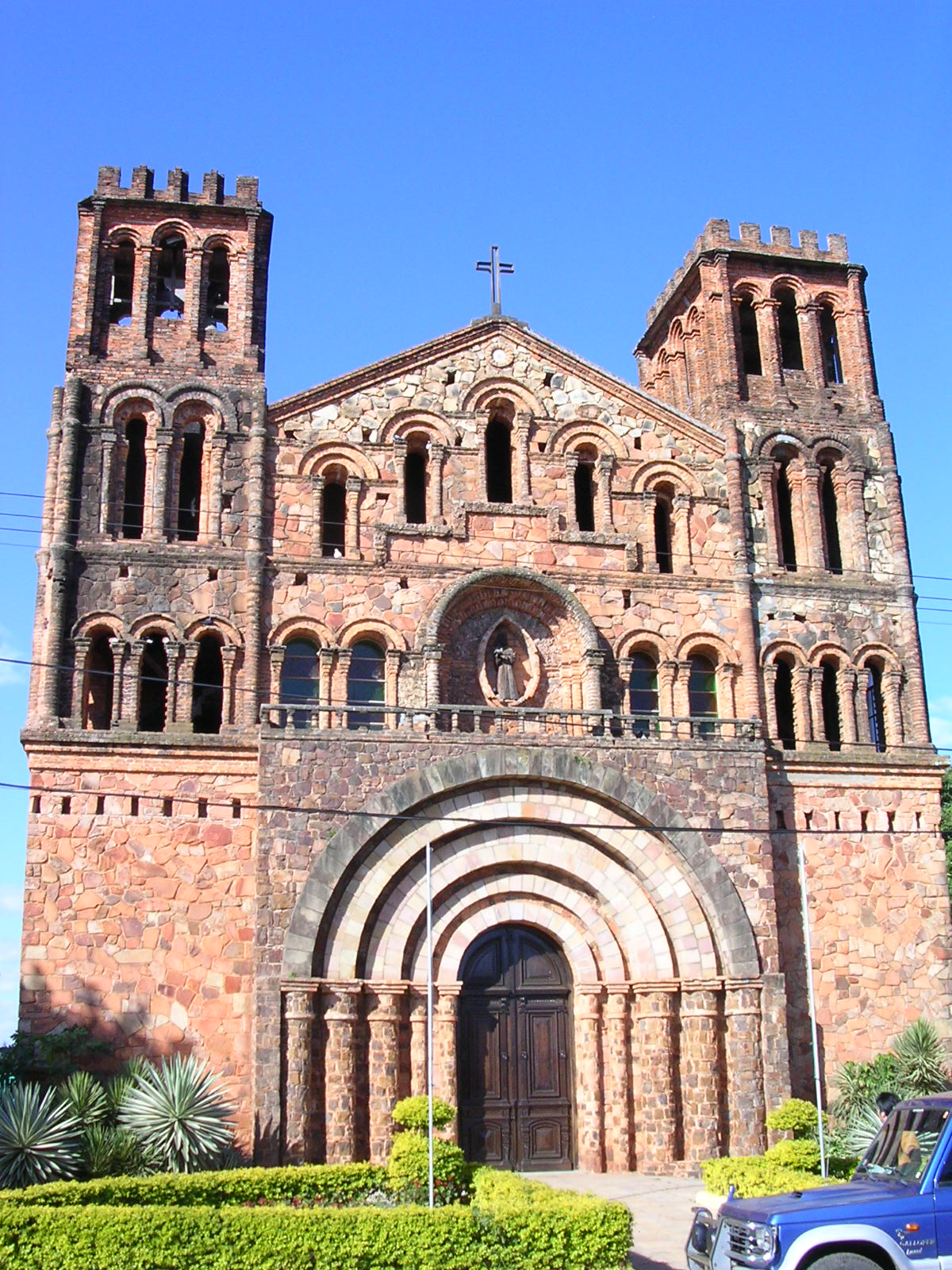

Location
- Country: Paraguay
- Metropolitan: Asunción

Statistics
- Area: 3,946 km^{2} (1,524 sq mi)
- Population: Total; Catholics: (as of 2025); 225,410; 198,360 (88%)

Information
- Rite: Latin Rite

Current leadership
- Pope: Leo XIV
- Bishop: Miguel Ángel Cabello

Map

The Roman Catholic Diocese of Villarrica del Espíritu Santo (Latin: Dioecesis Villaricensis Spiritus Sancti) is a Latin Rite suffragan diocese in the ecclesiastical province of the Metropolitan Archdiocese of Asunción, which covers all of and only Paraguay.

Its cathedral episcopal see is Catedral Santa Clara, dedicated to Saint Clara, in the city of Villarrica, Guairá Department.

== Statistics ==
As of 22 March 2025, it had 198,360 Catholics (88% of 225,410 total) on 3,946 km² in 25 parishes, 42 priests (35 diocesan, 7 religious), 43 deacons, and 12 seminarians.

== History ==
On 1 May 1929, the Diocese of Villarrica was established on territory split off from the then Diocese of Paraguay.

It received a papal visit from Pope John Paul II in May 1988.

On 13 January 1990, the Diocese was renamed, or more precisely given an alternative name, as Diocese of Villarrica del Espíritu Santo to avoid being confused with its Chilean namesake.

Villarrica del Espíritu Santo has been split to create other dioceses:

- 19 January 1957, to establish the Diocese of San Juan Bautista.
- 21 January 1957, to establish the Territorial Prelature of Encarnación and Alto Paraná (now a diocese).
- 5 June 1978, to establish the Diocese of Carapeguá.
- 22 March 2025, to establish the Diocese of Caazapá.

== Leadership ==
No.	Name	Episcopacy
1	Agustín Rodríguez Argüello (1900–1968)	19 October 1931 – 4 December 1965
2	Felipe Santiago Benítez (Note: Alongside Auxiliary Bishop Ángel Acha from 1975 to 1978.) (1926–2009)	4 December 1965 – 20 May 1989
3	Sebelio Peralta (Note: Auxiliary bishop from 1979 to 1990.) (1939–2014)	19 April 1990 – 27 December 2008
4	Ricardo Valenzuela (b. 1954)	25 June 2010 – 29 June 2017
5	Adalberto Martínez (b. 1951)	23 June 2018 – 17 February 2022
6	Miguel Ángel Cabello (b. 1965)	5 December 2024 – Incumbent

== See also ==
- List of Catholic dioceses in Paraguay
