= Ismael Rolón =

Paraguayan prelate

Ismael Blas Rolón Silvero, S.D.B.
- Bishop of Archdiocese of Asuncion
- Church: Roman Catholic Church
- See: Archdiocese of Asuncion
- In office: 1970–1989
- Predecessor: Juan Mena Porta
- Successor: Felipe Benitez Avalos
- Previous post: Priest

Orders
- Ordination: November 23, 1941

Personal details
- Born: January 24, 1914 Caazapá, Paraguay
- Died: June 8, 2010 (aged 96)

Ismael Blas Rolón Silvero S.D.B. (January 24, 1914 – June 8, 2010) was a Paraguayan prelate of the Roman Catholic Church. At the time of his death, he was one of the oldest Catholic bishops and the oldest bishop from Paraguay.

== Early life ==
Rolón Silvero was born in Caazapá, Paraguay in 1914. He was ordained a priest on November 23, 1941, from the religious institute of the Salesians of Don Bosco.

== Priest and Bishop ==
He was appointed prelate to the Caacupé Diocese on August 2, 1960. On October 20, 1965, he was appointed Titular Bishop of Furnos Maior and ordained January 23, 1966. Rolón Silvero was appointed bishop of the Caacupé Diocese and then appointed to the Archdiocese of Asunción on June 16, 1970. Rolón retired from the Archdiocese of Asuncion on May 20, 1989.

== Death ==
Silvero died at the age of 96.
