= Archdiocese of Asunción =

Roman Catholic archdiocese in Paraguay

Coordinates: 25.2816°S 57.6325°W

Archdiocese of Asunción Archidioecesis Sanctissimae Assumptionis Arquidiócesis de la Santísima Asunción

Catholic
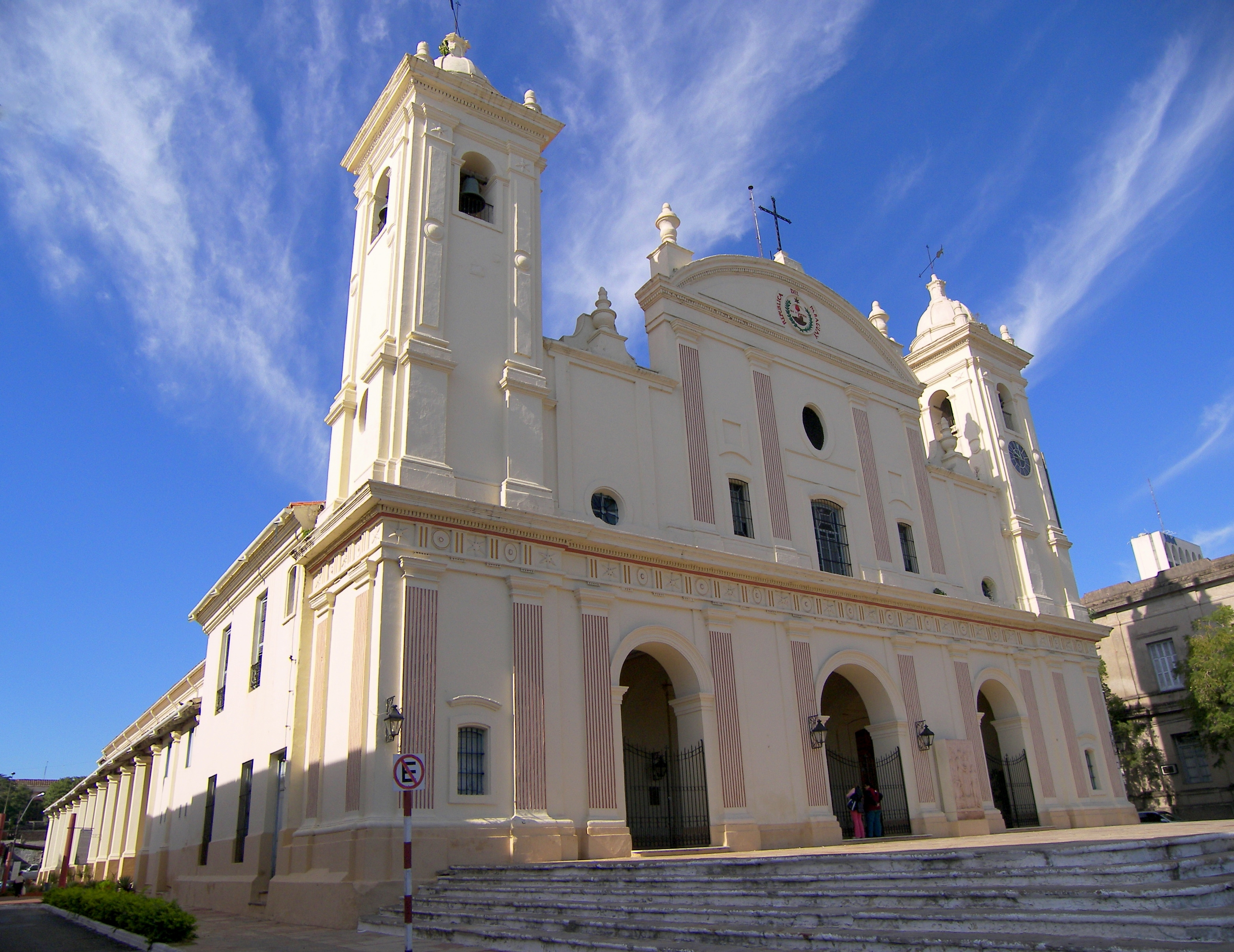
- Cathedral of Our Lady of the Assumption, Asunción

Location
- Country: Paraguay
- Territory: Asunción
- Ecclesiastical province: Asunción

Statistics
- Area: 997 sq mi (2,580 km^{2})
- Population: Total; Catholics: (as of 2015); 1,839,000; 1,664,000 (90.5%)
- Parishes: 76

Information
- Denomination: Roman Catholic
- Rite: Roman Rite
- Established: 1 July 1547
- Cathedral: Cathedral of Our Lady of the Assumption
- Secular priests: 81

Current leadership
- Pope: Leo XIV
- Metropolitan Archbishop: Adalberto Martínez Flores
- Bishops emeritus: Edmundo Valenzuela, SDB

Map

Website
- www.arzobispado.org.py

The Roman Catholic Archdiocese of the Blessed Assumption (Latin: Archidioecesis Sanctissimae Assumptionis) is an ecclesiastical territory or diocese of the Roman Catholic Church in Paraguay.

It was created as the Diocese of Paraguay by Pope Paul III on July 1, 1547, and was elevated to the rank of a metropolitan archdiocese by Pope Pius XI on May 1, 1929, with the suffragan sees of Benjamín Aceval, Caacupé, Carapeguá, Ciudad del Este, Concepción, Coronel Oviedo, Encarnación, San Juan Bautista de las Misiones, San Lorenzo, San Pedro, and Villarrica del Espíritu Santo.

The archdiocese's mother church and thus seat of its archbishop is the Cathedral of Our Lady of the Assumption. As the only metropolitan in Paraguay, it is the principal episcopal see of that country. The archdiocese has 1.58 million Catholics (90.6%) in 2012.

Archbishop Flores succeeded to the see on March 6, 2022.

== Bishops ==
=== Ordinaries ===
Diocese of Paraguay

Erected: 1 July 1547
Latin Name: de Paraguay

1. Juan de los Barrios, O.F.M. (1547–1552), appointed Bishop of Santa Marta, Colombia
2. Pedro de la Torre, O.F.M. (1554–1573)
3. Alfonso Guerra (bishop), O.P. (1579–1592), appointed Bishop of Michoacán, México
4. Thomas Vásquez de Liaño (1596–1599)
5. Martín Ignacio de Loyola (1601–1608)
6. Reginaldo de Lizárraga, O.P. (1609)
7. Lorenzo Pérez de Grado (1615–1619), appointed Bishop of Cuzco, Peru
8. Tomás de la Torre Gibaja, O.P. (1620–1628), appointed Bishop of Córdoba (Tucumán), Argentina
9. Cristóbal de Aresti Martínez de Aguilar, O.S.B. (1629–1635), appointed Bishop of Buenos Aires, Argentina
10. Francisco de la Serna, O.E.S.A. (1635–1638), appointed Bishop of Popayán, Colombia
11. Bernardino de Cárdenas Ponce, O.F.M. (1640–1666), appointed Bishop of Santa Cruz de la Sierra, Bolivia
12. Gabriel de Guilléstegui, O.F.M. (1666–1670), appointed Bishop of La Paz, Bolivia
13. Ferdinandus de Valcácer (1672)
14. Faustino Casas Hernández, O. de M. (1674–1686)
15. Sebastián de Pastrana, O. de M. (1693–1700)
16. Pedro Díaz de Durana (1704–1718)
17. José Luis Palos Bord, O.F.M. (1724–1738)
18. José Cayetano Paravicino, O.F.M. (1738–1747), appointed Bishop of Trujillo, Peru
19. Bernardo José Pérez de Oblitas (1747–1756), appointed Bishop of Santa Cruz de la Sierra, Bolivia
20. Manuel Antonio de la Torre (1756–1762), appointed Bishop of Buenos Aires, Argentina
21. Emmanuel López de Espinosa (1762–1770)
22. Juan José Priego y Caro, O.P. (1772–1779)
23. Luis Velasco y Maeda, O.F.M. (1779–1792)
24. Lorenzo Suarez de Cantillana (1797–1799)
25. Nicolás Videla del Pino (1802–1806), appointed Bishop of Salta, Argentina
26. Pedro García de Panés, O.F.M. (1807–1838)
27. Basilio López (1844–1859)
28. Juan Gregorio Urbieta (1860–1865)
29. Manuel Antonio Palacios (1865–1868)
30. Pietro Giovanni Aponte (1879–1891)
31. Juan Sinforiano Bogarín (1894–1929), elevated along with the diocese (see below)

Archdiocese of Asunción

Elevated: 1 May 1929
Latin Name: Sanctissimae Assumptionis

1. Juan Sinforiano Bogarín (1929–1949)
2. Juan José Aníbal Mena Porta (1949–1970)
3. Ismael Blas Rolón Silvero, S.D.B. (1970–1989)
4. Felipe Santiago Benítez Ávalos (1989–2002)
5. Pastor Cuquejo, C.Ss.R. (2002–2014)
6. Edmundo Valenzuela, S.D.B. (2014–2022)
7. Adalberto Martínez Flores (2022–present)

=== Coadjutor bishops ===
- Martín de Sarricolea y Olea (1720), did not take effect
- José Luis Palos Bord, O.F.M. (1721–1724)
- Manuel Antonio Palacios (1863–1865)
- Juan José Aníbal Mena Porta (1941–1949)
- Edmundo Ponziano Valenzuela Mellid, S.D.B. (2011–2014)

=== Auxiliary bishops ===
- Marco Antonio Maiz (1844–1848)
- Juan Gregorio Urbieta (1856–1860), appointed Bishop here
- Juan José Aníbal Mena Porta (1936–1941), appointed Coadjutor here
- Ramón Pastor Bogarín Argaña (1954–1957), appointed Bishop of San Juan Bautista de las Misiones
- Aníbal Maricevich Fleitas (1957–1965), appointed Bishop of Concepción y Chaco
- Felipe Santiago Benitez Avalos (1961–1965), appointed Bishop of Villarrica (later returned here as Archbishop)
- Julio Benigno Laschi González (1965–1969)
- Juan Moleón Andreu (1967–1972), appointed Bishop of Paraguay, Military
- Jorge Adolfo Carlos Livieres Banks (1976–1987), appointed Prelate of Encarnación
- Eustaquio Pastor Cuquejo Verga, C.Ss.R. (1982–1992), appointed Bishop of Paraguay, Military (later returned here as Archbishop)
- Claudio Giménez Medina, P. Schönstatt (1991–1995), appointed Bishop of Caacupé
- Ricardo Jorge Valenzuela Rios (1993–2003), appointed Bishop of Paraguay, Military
- Adalberto Martínez Flores (1997–2000), appointed Bishop of San Lorenzo

=== Other priests of this diocese who became bishops ===
- Juan González Melgarejo, appointed Bishop of Santiago de Chile in 1743
- Joaquín Hermes Robledo Romero (priest here, 1975–2000), appointed Coadjutor Bishop of Carapeguá in 2009

== See also ==
- Roman Catholicism in Paraguay
- List of Roman Catholic dioceses in Paraguay
