= Priority urbanization area =

French new town development programme

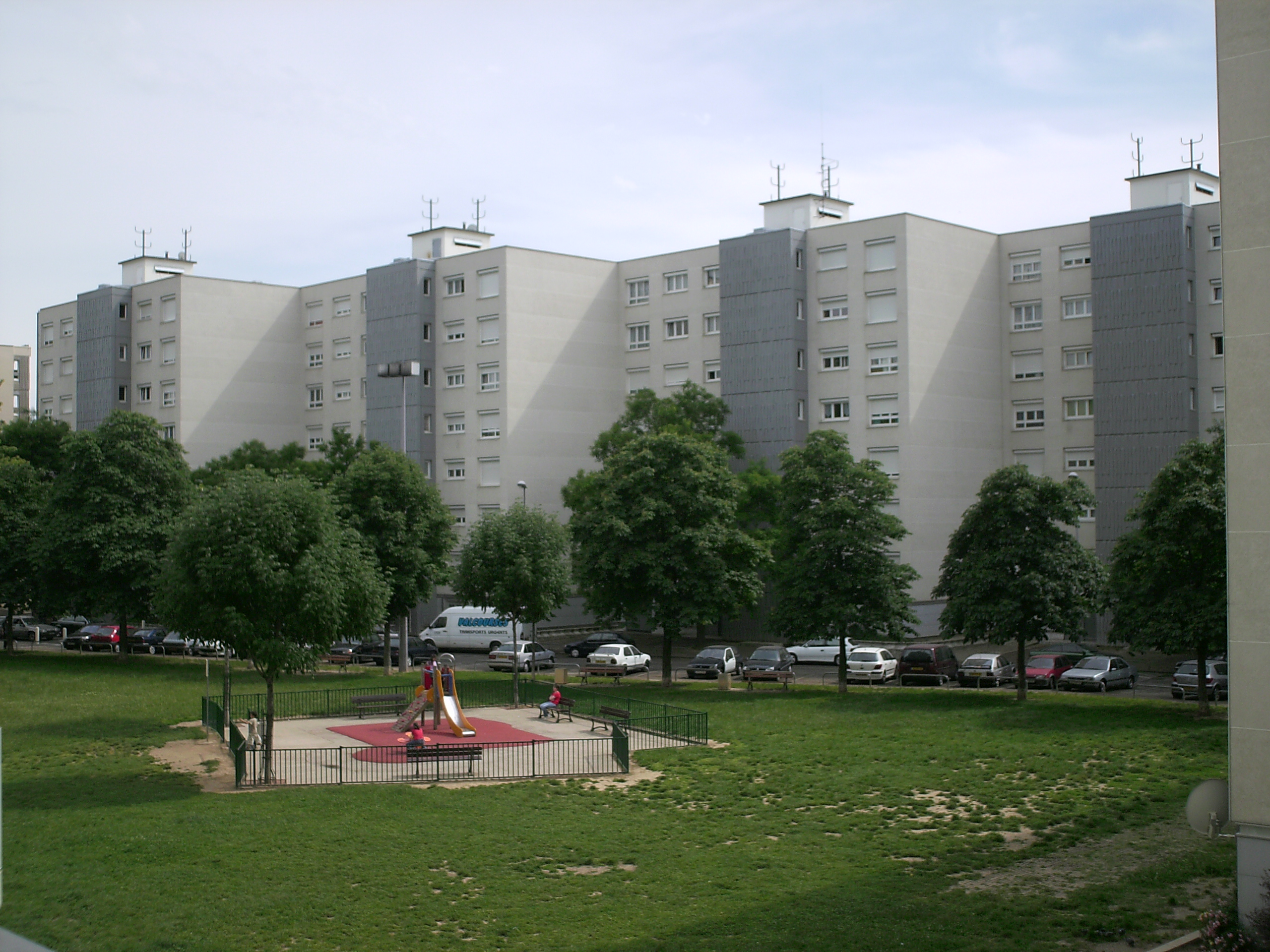
The Minguettes district in Vénissieux, an example of a ZUP development.

A Priority Urbanization Zone (ZUP; French: Zone à urbaniser par priorité), was an administrative urban planning procedure used in France between 1959 and 1967 to address the growing demand for housing. ZUPs were designed to create new districts from initial inception, including residential buildings, commercial and community facilities.

Taking the form of large housing estates, ZUPs helped alleviate housing shortages but are generally considered to have fallen short of creating vibrant, dynamic neighborhoods. By metonymy, the term "ZUP" also refers to the districts and urban complexes resulting from this planning process.

ZUPs are frequently targeted by France's "urban policy" initiatives and the national urban renewal program led by the National Agency for Urban Renewal (ANRU).

== Background ==
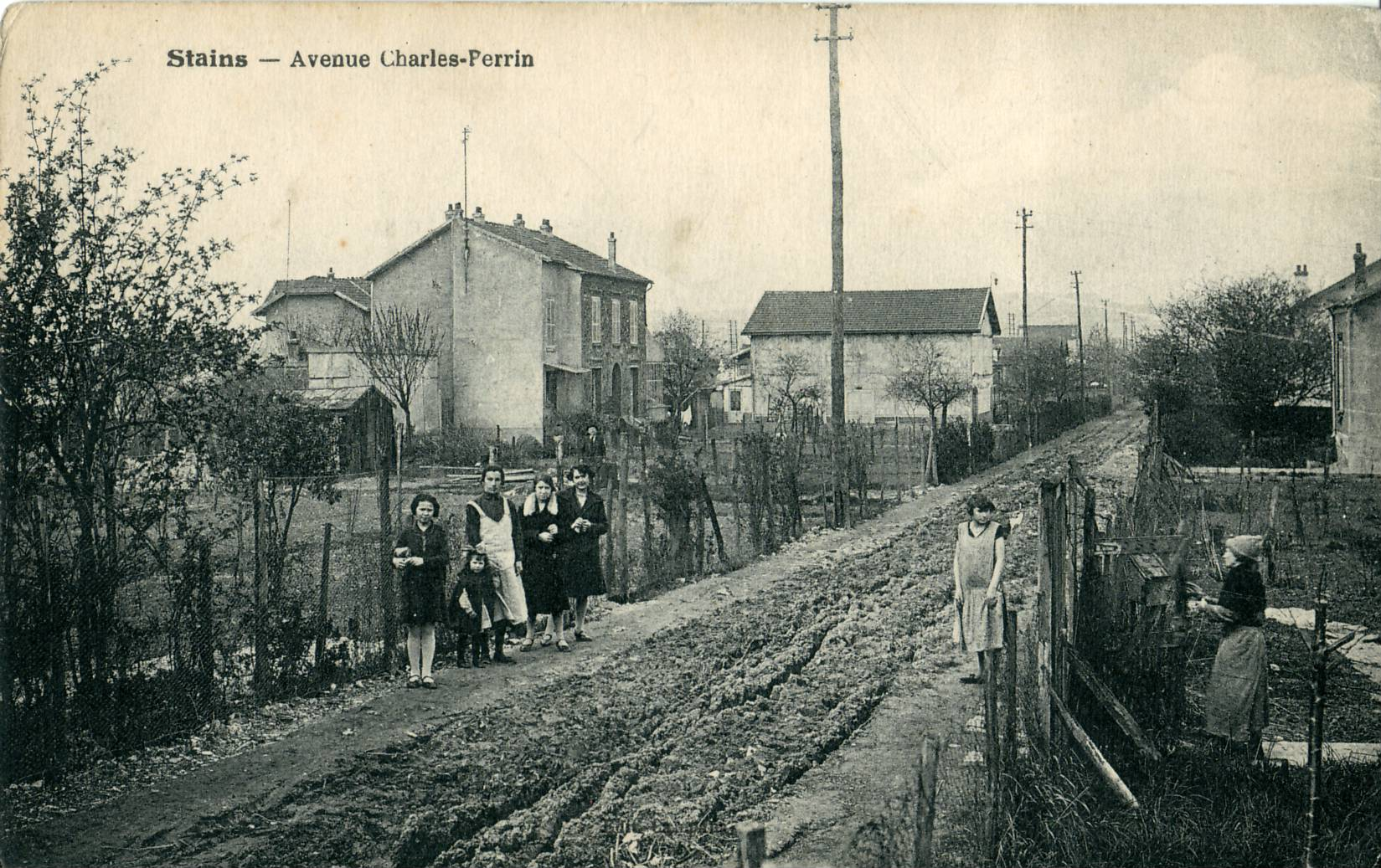
A pre-World War I housing estate in Stains, where the street is merely a muddy path.

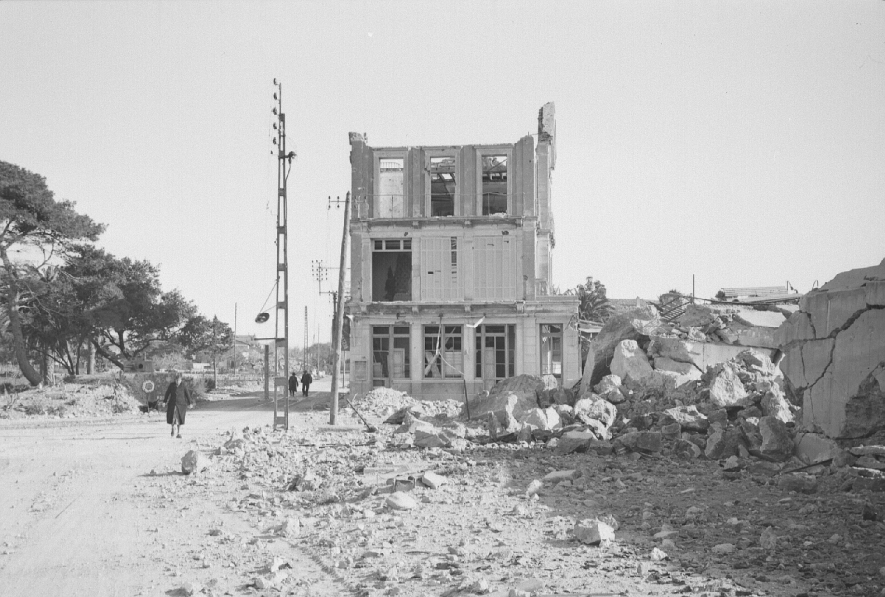
War-related destruction in Brest, illustrating the need for post-war reconstruction.

Urban development between the world wars primarily occurred through suburban housing estates, subdivided and sold by speculators. These developments often suffered from limited scale, poor integration with urban plans established under the 1919 and 1924 laws, and inadequate infrastructure, resulting in makeshift constructions by low-income populations.

Post-World War II, France faced a severe housing crisis. Of the 12.6 million housing units in 1946, one-third were overcrowded, and half lacked running water. In Paris, 42% of residents lived in substandard or overcrowded conditions. The crisis was exacerbated by the destruction of approximately 500,000 homes during the war, coupled with population growth from the rural flight, the baby boom, and the arrival of immigrant populations and repatriates from Algeria.

The push for new housing led to a steady increase in France's housing stock, growing from 18.2 million units in 1968 to 21.078 million in 1975, 23.7 million in 1982, 26.2 million in 1990, and 28.7 million in 1999. ZUPs significantly contributed to this growth, providing millions of people access to modern amenities.

== Definition and implementation ==
The ZUP framework was established by Decree No. 58-1464 on 31 December 1958. It aimed to facilitate the rapid development of new urban areas by planning and financing housing and community infrastructure in "municipalities or agglomerations where the scale of housing construction programs necessitates the creation, reinforcement, or expansion of collective facilities." The goal was to address housing shortages driven by population growth, improve urban planning, and eliminate substandard housing.

ZUPs enabled the swift equipping of land designated for new urban projects. The responsible local authority, often a commune or the state, partnered with a public entity or a mixed economy company to expropriate land, develop infrastructure, and sell it to developers. Funding was partially provided by the state, with the local prefect approving key elements such as master plans and programs.

To maximize construction efforts, ZUPs required a minimum of 500 housing units, though most exceeded this threshold. Between 1957 and 1969, 197 ZUPs were developed, resulting in 2.2 million housing units. In Dunkirk, heavily impacted by wartime destruction, local officials secured the creation of one of the first ZUPs in 1959 at "Nouvelles Synthes," alongside the development of a large industrial-port zone to accommodate major industries like Usinor Dunkerque.

However, the large housing estate model quickly revealed its limitations. Despite intentions to avoid creating dormitory towns, ZUPs often resulted in standardized architecture (notably the "crane path" design) and a predominance of social housing. Recognizing these shortcomings, ZUPs were replaced by Concerted Development Zones (ZACs) under the Land Planning Law of 1967. After 1969, no new ZUPs could be created, and existing ones were either phased out or transitioned to other planning mechanisms.

In the 1970s, France shifted to a new towns policy, aiming to create fully functional cities rather than mere planned neighborhoods. A notable exception is the ZUP of Les Ulis in Essonne, established in 1960, which became an independent municipality in 1977.

== ZUPs in France ==
Below is a non-exhaustive list of ZUPs, organized by region.

In 1959, two ZUPs were created in French Algeria, in the city of Algiers:

- Les Annassers
- Rouiba-Reghaia

These projects were abandoned in 1962 following Algerian independence.

=== Alsace ===
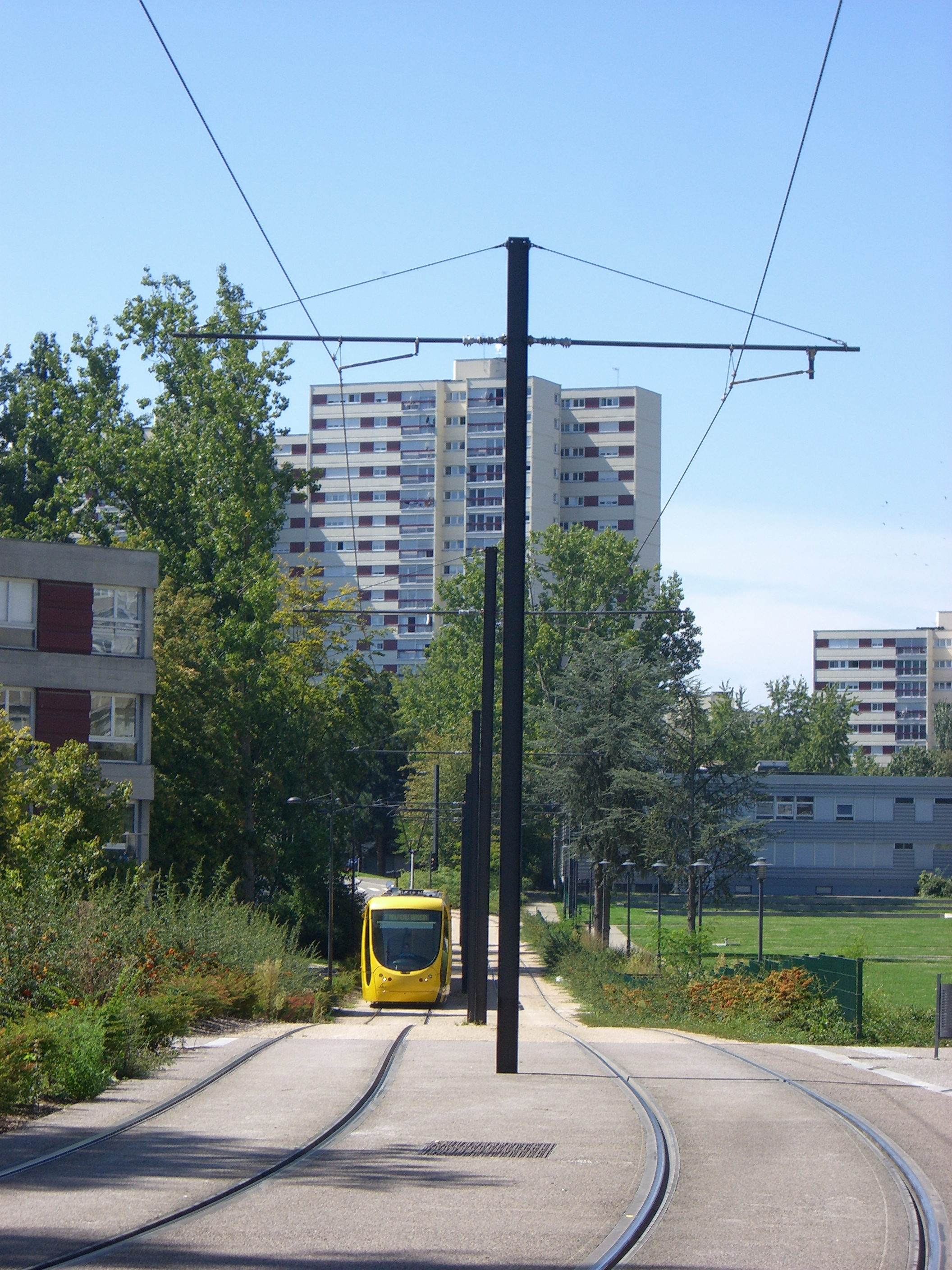
Les Coteaux in Mulhouse, a prominent ZUP.

- Europe, Colmar (Haut-Rhin): Established in 1960, with 3,400 housing units built from 1959. Architect-urbanist: Charles-Gustave Stoskopf.
- Les Coteaux, Mulhouse (Haut-Rhin), commonly called the "ZUP de Mulhouse": Established in 1960, with 3,200 housing units. Architect-urbanist: Marcel Lods.
- Volgelsheim, near Neuf-Brisach (Haut-Rhin): Established in 1966.
- Hautepierre, Strasbourg (Bas-Rhin): Established in 1964, with 4,971 housing units built from 1964 to 1981. Architect-urbanists: Pierre Vivien.

=== Aquitaine ===
- Sainte-Croix/Saint-Esprit, Bayonne: 1,100 housing units built from 1963 to 1974. Architect-urbanist: Marcel Breuer.
- Biscarrosse (Landes): Established in 1964.
- Hauts de Garonne, Cenon (Palmer district), Floirac, and Lormont (Genicart district), on the right bank of the Garonne, in the Bordeaux agglomeration: 7,000 housing units built from 1960 to 1975. Architect-urbanists: Jean Fayeton and Francisque Perrier.
- Tourasse-Buros, Pau: Architect-urbanist: André Remondet.
- Thouars, Talence and Villenave-d'Ornon, Bordeaux agglomeration: Established in 1961.

=== Auvergne ===
- Les-Cézeaux-Les-Landais, Clermont-Ferrand (Puy-de-Dôme): Established in 1960.
- Croix de Neyrat and Flamina, Clermont-Ferrand (Puy-de-Dôme): Established in 1965.
- La Plaine, Clermont-Ferrand (Puy-de-Dôme): Established in 1960.
- Champins, Moulins (Allier): Established in 1967.
- Guitard, Le Puy-en-Velay (Haute-Loire): Established in 1967.

=== Burgundy ===
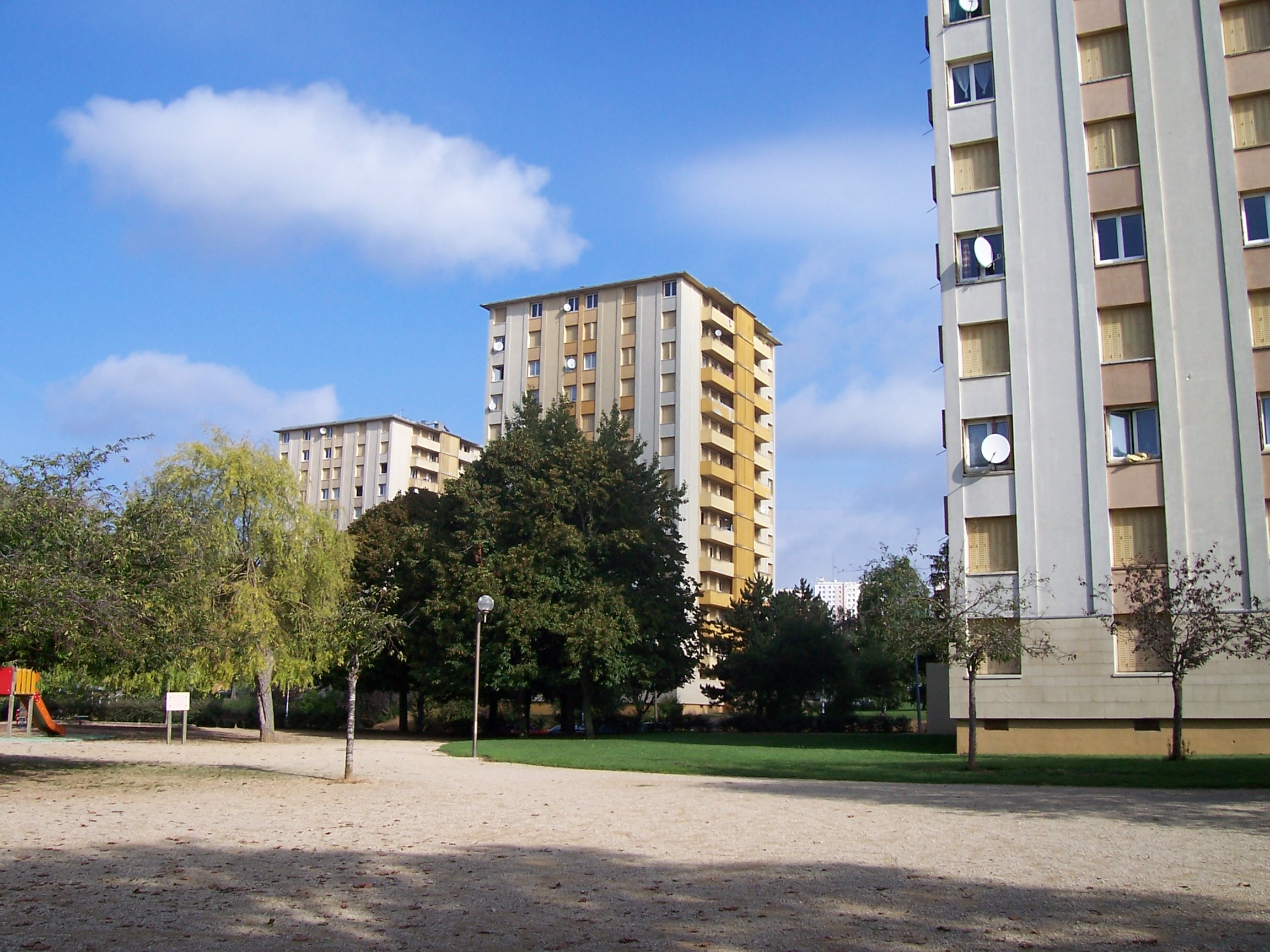
Les Brichères in the Hauts d'Auxerre district.

- Saint-Pantaléon, Autun (Saône-et-Loire): Established in 1964, with 1,200 housing units.
- Sainte-Geneviève, Auxerre (Yonne): Established in 1960, with 2,500 housing units.
- Mignottes, Migennes, near Auxerre (Yonne): Established in 1966.
- Derrière-Cluny, Beaune (Côte-d'Or): Established in 1966.
- Prés-Saint-Jean, Chalon-sur-Saône (Saône-et-Loire): Established in 1966, completed in 1979, with 3,100 housing units. Architect-urbanist: Daniel Petit.
- Le Mail, Chenôve, near Dijon (Côte-d'Or): Established in 1960, with 4,600 housing units built from 1960 to 1969. Architect-urbanist: Henri-Jean Calsat.
- Fontaine d'Ouche, Dijon (Côte-d'Or): Established in 1962, with 4,200 housing units.
- Nord, Mâcon-Flacé (Saône-et-Loire): Established in 1962.
- L'Etang-du-Plessis, Montceau-les-Mines (Saône-et-Loire): Established in 1966.
- Grahuches, now Champs-Plaisants, Sens (Yonne): Established in 1960.

=== Brittany ===
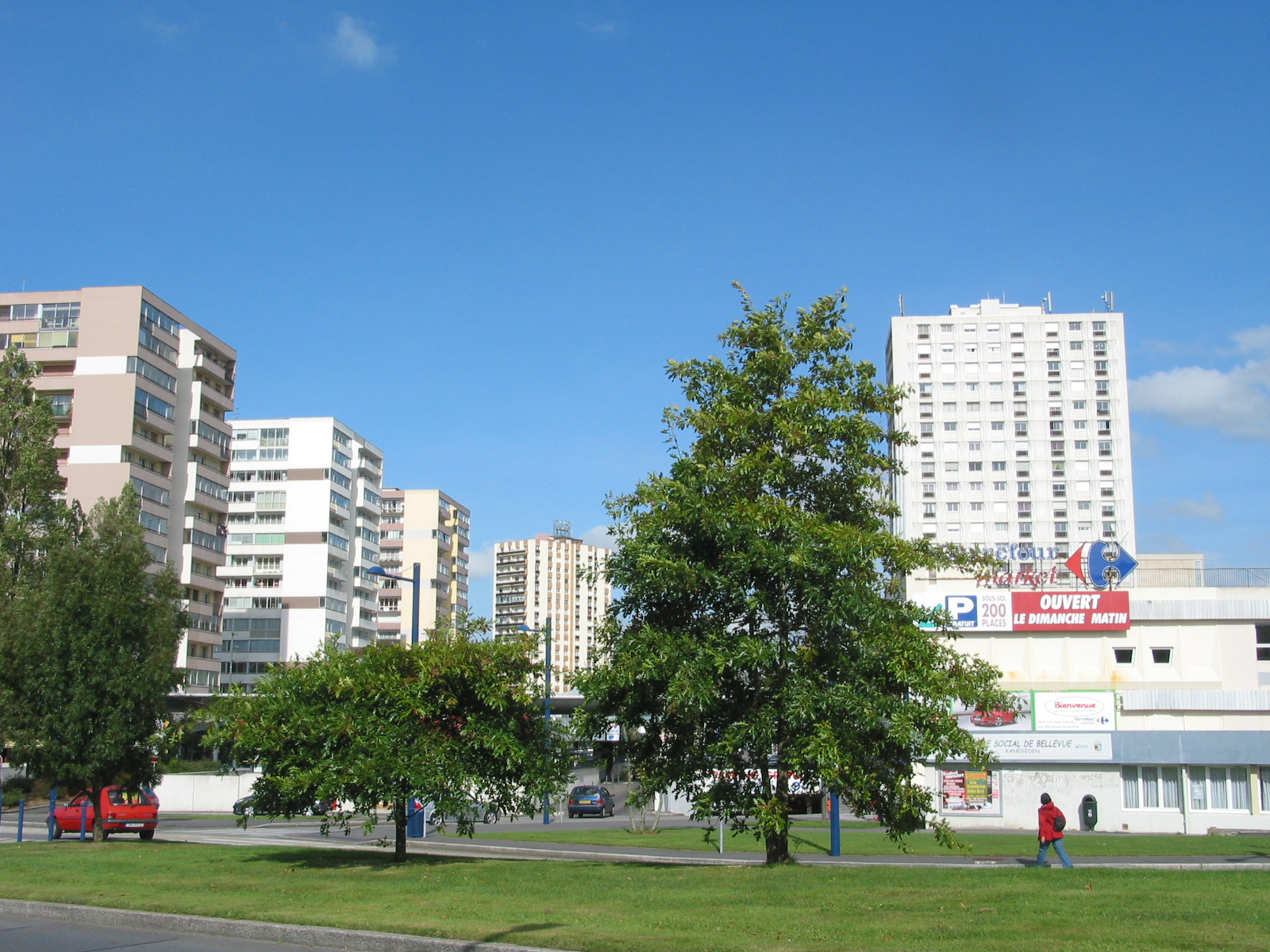
Bellevue district in Brest.

- Bellevue (B2 or Brest 2), now Bellevue, Brest: 8,300 housing units built from 1958 to 1977, housing 20,287 residents. Architect-urbanist: Henry Auffret. See Canton de Brest-Bellevue.
- Zone Nord, now Ker-huel, Lannion (Côtes-d'Armor): Established 1962–1971, with 586 housing units. Architect-urbanist: Michel Marty.
- Kervénanec, Lorient and Ploemeur: Established in 1962, built from 1966 to 1976. Architect-urbanist: André Schmitz.
- Maurepas, Rennes: 4,200 housing units, built from 1955 to 1966. Architect-urbanists: Jean-Michel Legrand and Jacques Rabinel.
- Villejean-Malifeu, Rennes: Established in 1959, with 6,000 housing units built from 1963 to 1975. Architect-urbanist: Louis Arretche.
- Blosne, also ZUP Sud, Rennes, in the Le Blosne and Bréquigny districts: Established between 1959 and 1975, with 14,000 housing units. Architect-urbanist: Michel Marty.
- Kermoysan, Quimper: Established in 1962, built from 1960 to 1977. Architect-urbanist: Henry Auffret.
- Plateau-Central, Saint-Brieuc: Established in 1960.
- La-Croix-Saint-Lambert, Saint-Brieuc: Established in 1967.
- Ménimur, Vannes: Established in 1966. Architect-urbanist: Henry Auffret.

=== Centre-Val de Loire ===
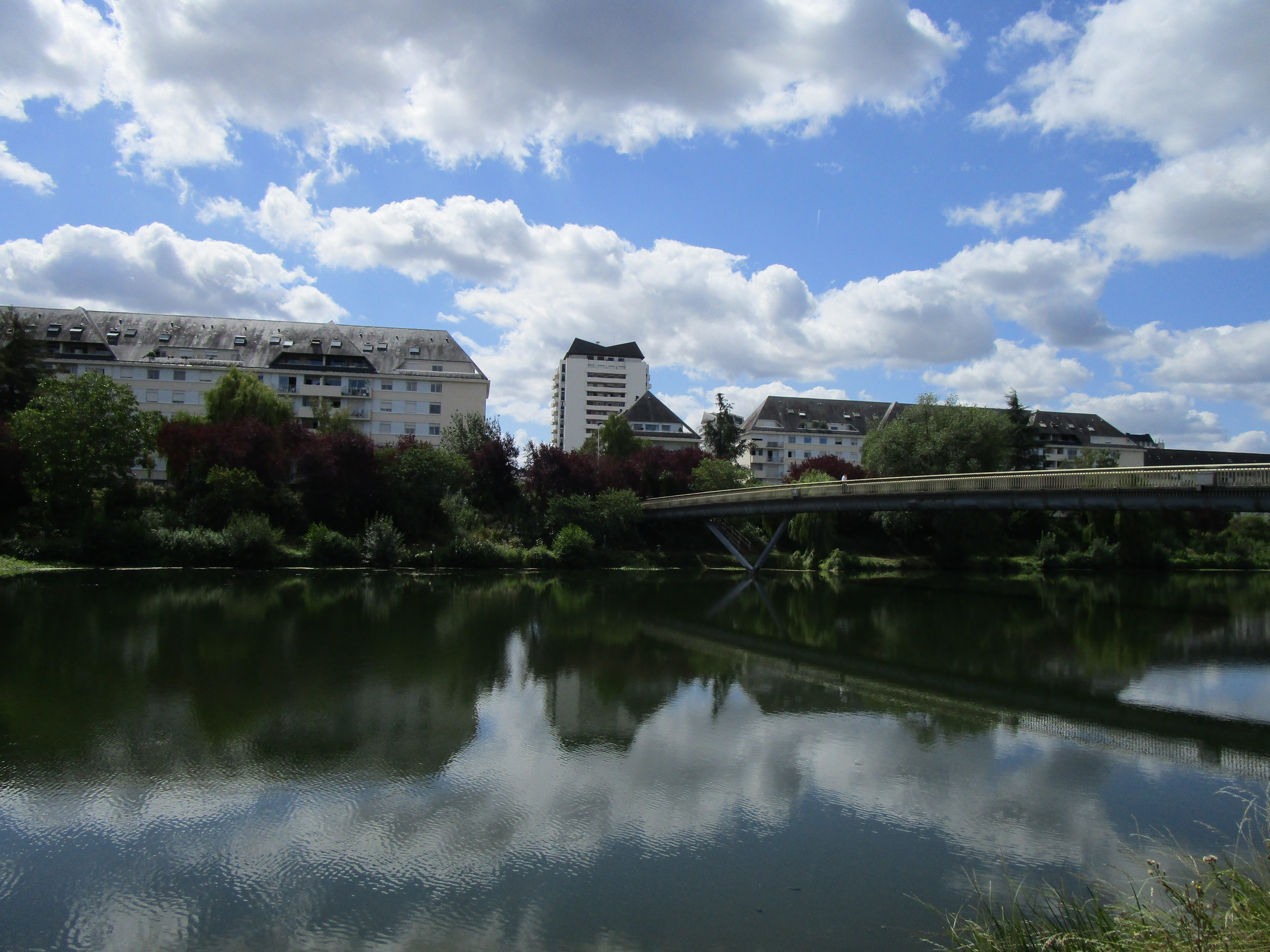
The Fontaines district in Tours.

- Nord, also "quartiers nord," Blois: Established on 3 August 1959, with 6,450 housing units and 19,547 residents.
- Gibjoncs, northern districts, Bourges: Established in 1960, with 4,935 housing units built from 1961 to 1976. Architect-urbanist: Guy Pison.
- Madeleine, Chartres (Eure-et-Loir): Established in 1964. Architect-urbanist: Henri-Pierre Maillard.
- Champ-Auger (ZUP No. 1) or Saint-Jean, Châteauroux (Indre): Established in 1961, with 2,200 housing units built from 1961 to 1972. Architect-urbanist: Jean-Pierre Allain.
- Chemin du Grand Poirier (ZUP No. 2), Châteauroux (Indre): 2,200 housing units built from 1966 to 1975. Architect-urbanist: Jean Lasry.
- Chaussée, Montargis: Established in 1962.
- Fleury-les-Aubrais, Orléans agglomeration (Loiret): Established in 1960. Architect-urbanist: Jean Bossu.
- Argonne, Orléans: Established in 1960.
- La Rabière, Joué-lès-Tours (Indre-et-Loire): Established in 1960, with 3,000 housing units. Architect-urbanist: Jacques Poirrier.
- Vallée du Cher (ZUP No. 1), Tours and Saint-Pierre-des-Corps: Established in 1967, with 5,000 housing units, now the Fontaines and Rochepinard districts. Architect-urbanists: Joël Hardion and Pierre Dalloz.
- Clos-du-Roy, Vierzon (Cher): Established in 1967.

=== Champagne-Ardenne ===
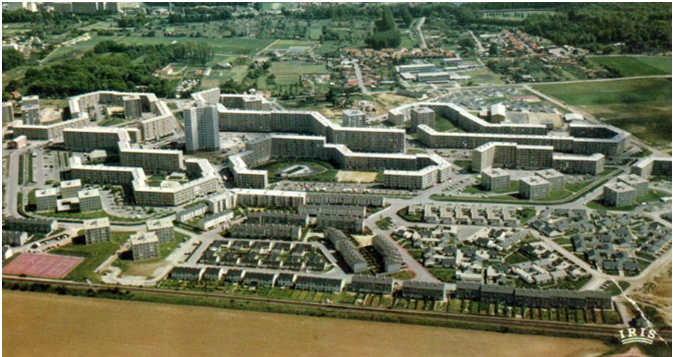
Châtillons district in Reims.

- Corvées, Chalons-sur-Marne/Saint-Memmie: Established in 1962.
- Ronde-Couture, Charleville-Mézières (Ardennes), formerly Mohon: Established in 1963, with 10,500 residents. Architect-urbanist: Michel Folliasson.
- La Citadelle, Charleville-Mézières (Ardennes): Established in 1960.
- La Rochotte, Chaumont (Haute-Marne): Established in 1965.
- Mont-Bernon, Épernay (Marne): Established in 1963. Architect-urbanists: Michel Andrault and Pierre Parat.
- Laon-Neufchâtel, now Orgeval district, Reims (Marne): Established in 1960, with 2,600 housing units from 1960.
- Bocquaine, now Châtillons district, Reims (Marne): Established in 1963, with 3,000 housing units built from 1966 to 1970. Architect-urbanists: Tremblot and Clauzier.
- Orzy, Revin (Ardennes): Established in 1959, with 3,000 residents.
- Saint-Dizier (Haute-Marne), now Le Vert-Bois-Le Grand Lachat: Established in 1967.
- La Chapelle-Saint-Luc-Les Noës-près-Troyes, Troyes agglomeration (Aube): Established in 1963. Architect-urbanist: Michel Colle.
- Prairie, Sedan (Ardennes): Established in 1960, now Lac district, with 4,100 residents.
- Torcy-cités, Sedan (Ardennes): 3,000 residents.
- Vitry-Nord, Vitry-le-François (Marne): Established in 1962, built from 1966.

=== Franche-Comté ===
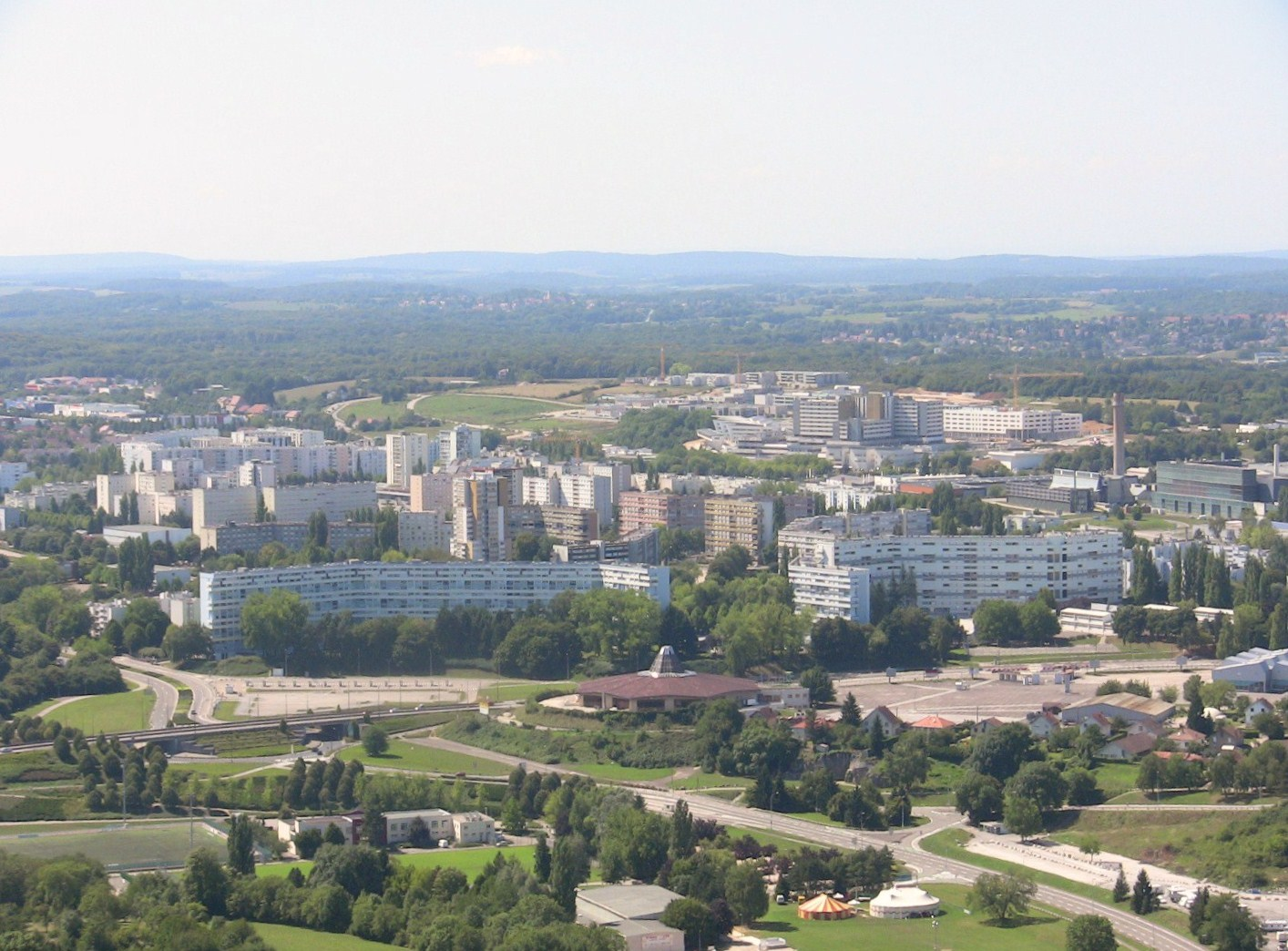
The Planoise district in Besançon.

- Résidences Bellevue, Belfort: Established in 1959, with 2,000 housing units built from 1959 to 1970. Architect-urbanist: Jean Fayeton.
- Avenue-d'Altkirch, Belfort: Established in 1963.
- Planoise, Besançon (Doubs): Established in 1962, with 8,600 housing units built from 1960 to 1977, housing over 20,000 residents. Architect-urbanist: Maurice Novarina.
- Saint-Ylie, now Mesnils Pasteur, Dole (Jura): Established in 1962, with 1,850 housing units built from 1962 to 1978. Architect-urbanist: Maurice Novarina.
- Petite-Hollande, Montbéliard (Doubs): Established in 1963.

=== Île-de-France ===
The ZUP procedure was applied to 22 sites in the region between 1958 and 1969, covering 5,900 ha (15,000 acres) (roughly half the area of Paris) to create 140,000 housing units.

With the exception of Seine-et-Marne, the departments listed below, established under the law of 10 July 1964, did not exist when most ZUPs were created.

==== Seine-et-Marne ====
- Plaine du Lys, Dammarie-lès-Lys: 2,359 housing units built from 1959 to 1970. Architect-urbanist: Louis Arretche.
- Beauval, Meaux: 8,300 housing units built from 1960 to 1968. Architect-urbanist: Marcel Lods.
- L'Almont, Melun: 3,129 housing units built from 1962 to 1976. Architect-urbanist: Léon Bazin.
- Surville, Montereau-Fault-Yonne: 3,800 housing units built from 1961 to 1972. Architect-urbanist: Xavier Arsène-Henry.
- Mont-Saint-Martin, Nemours: 1,591 social housing units built from 1963 to 1981. Architect-urbanist: Henri-Jean Calsat.

==== Yvelines ====
- Le Val-Fourré, Mantes-la-Jolie: 8,300 housing units built from 1959 to 1977. Architect-urbanists: Raymond Lopez, Henri Longepierre, and M. Gojard.
- Bel-Air, Saint-Germain-en-Laye: Established in 1965, with 500 housing units.
- Sartrouville: Established in 1964. Architect-urbanist: Roland Dubrulle.
- Vélizy-Villacoublay (initially planned to include Meudon, Jouy-en-Josas, Clamart, and Bièvres in 1959, but only Vélizy was realized): Built from 1961 to 1967 (decree of 11 October 1961). Architect-urbanists: Robert Auzelle, Ivan Jankovic, and Alain Gillot.

==== Essonne ====
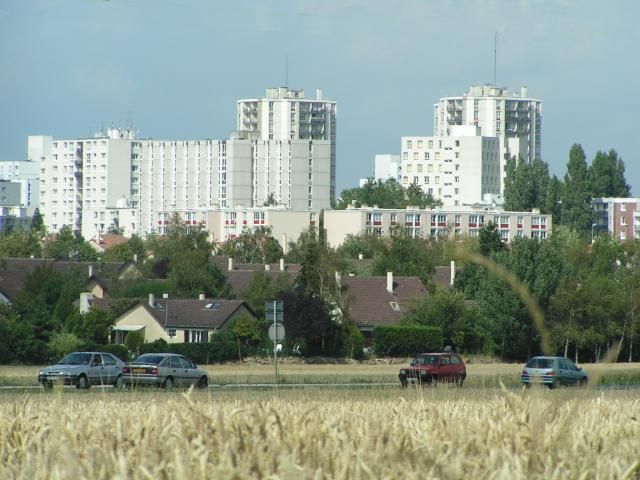
Les Ulis, designed by architect Robert Camelot.

- Villaine, Massy and Antony (Hauts-de-Seine): Established in 1959, with 9,400 housing units built from 1962 to 1968. Architect-urbanists: Louis de Hoym de Marien, Pierre Sonrel, and Jean Duthilleul.
- Les Ulis, Bures-sur-Yvette and Orsay, becoming an independent municipality in 1977: Established in 1960, built from 1963 to 1979. Architect-urbanists: François Prieur and Robert Camelot, later Georges-Henri Pingusson (1967–1969).

==== Hauts-de-Seine ====
- Gennevilliers, now Luth district: Established in 1965. Architect-urbanists: C. Auzolle and Otello Zavaroni.
- Meudon-la-Forêt, Meudon: Established in 1959.

==== Seine-Saint-Denis ====
- Sablons, Bobigny: Established in 1967. Architect-urbanist: Raymond Lopez.
- Intercommunal ZUP of Aulnay-sous-Bois, Sevran, Tremblay-en-France, Villepinte, and Mitry-Mory (Seine-et-Marne), covering 700 ha (1,700 acres): Established in 1960. Architect-urbanists: Michel Colle, Paul Herbé, and Jean Le Couteur. Reduced to specific projects, including Centre-Ville in Tremblay-en-France (3,000 housing units from 1960 to 1975) and Rose des Vents in Aulnay-sous-Bois (1969–1970).

==== Val-de-Marne ====
- New Créteil, Créteil (and parts of Bonneuil-sur-Marne and Maisons-Alfort): 6,000 housing units built from 1961 to 1974. Architect-urbanists: Jean Fayeton and Michel Folliasson, later Pierre Dufau (from 1967).
- La Plaine, now Val de Fontenay, Fontenay-sous-Bois: Established in 1960. Architect-urbanist: Marcel Lods.
- Vitry-sur-Seine: Planned for 8,930 housing units, established on 8 March 1960. Architect-urbanists: Mario Capra and André Remondet (consulting architect).

==== Val-d'Oise ====
- Val Notre-Dame, now Val d'Argent, Argenteuil: Established on 11 October 1961, with 8,000 housing units built from 1961 to 1972. Architect-urbanist: Roland Dubrulle.
- Ermont, Franconville, Sannois: Established in 1964. Architect-urbanists: Raymond Gravereaux and Prévert.
- Saint-Leu-la-Forêt-Le Plessis-Bouchard: Established in 1964. Architect-urbanists: Guy Pison and Clérin.
- Taverny: Established in 1964, completed in 1980 (mostly as a ZAC). Architect-urbanist: Atelier LWD.

=== Languedoc-Roussillon ===
- La Moulinelle, Beaucaire (Gard): Established in 1963.
- La Paillade, Montpellier (Hérault): Established on 23 January 1962. Architect-urbanists: Pierre Vetter, Claude Damery, and G.H. Weil, with 25,000 residents.
- La Devèze, Béziers (Hérault): Established in 1961.
- Pissevin, now Pissevin-Valdegour, Nîmes (Gard): Established in 1961. Architect-urbanist: Xavier Arsène-Henry.
- Pointe du Barrou (Ile de Thau), near Bassin de Thau, Sète (Hérault): Established in 1966. Architect-urbanist: Borja Huidobro.
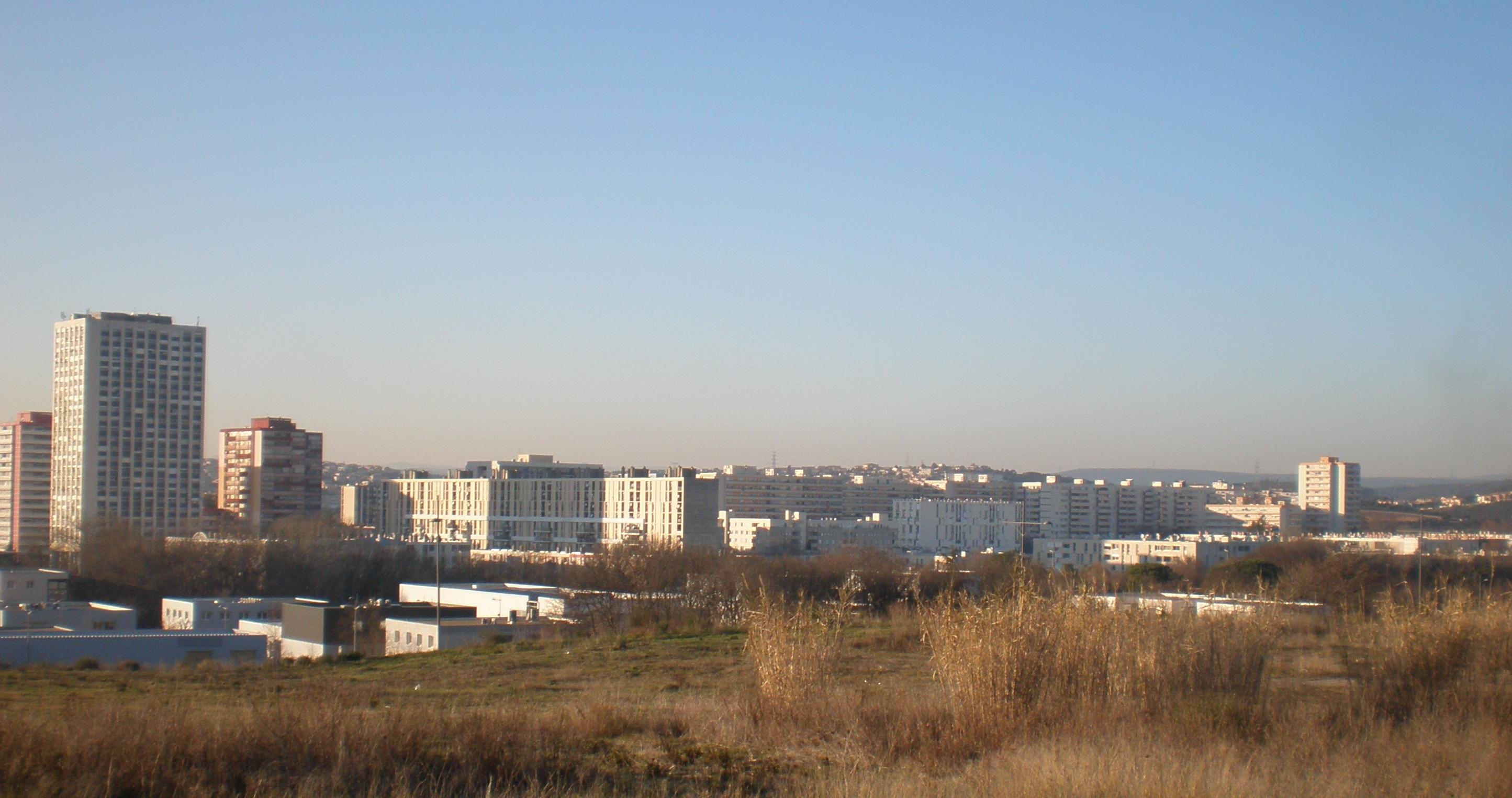
La Paillade in Montpellier.

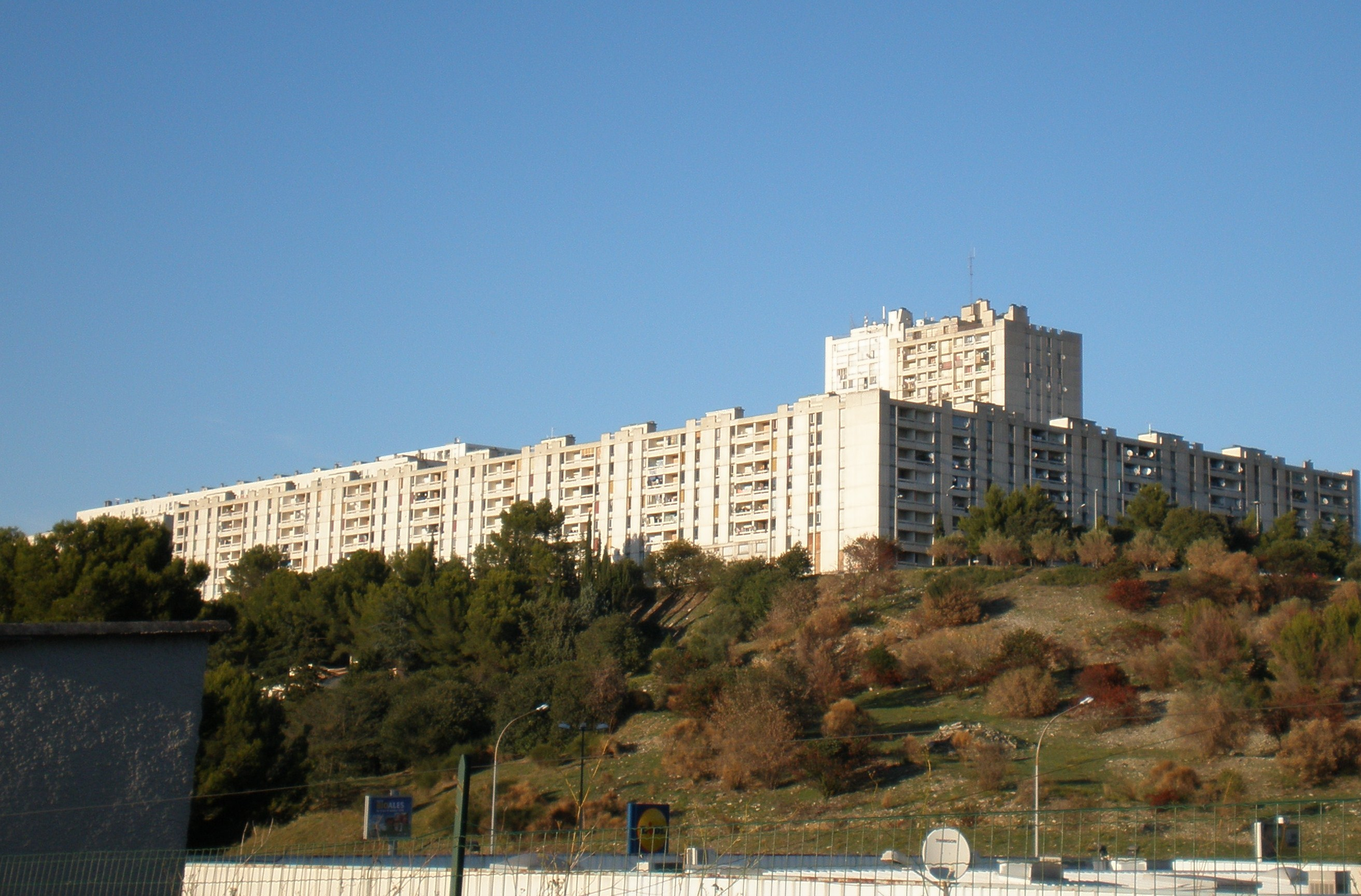
ZUP Nord Valdegour in Nîmes.

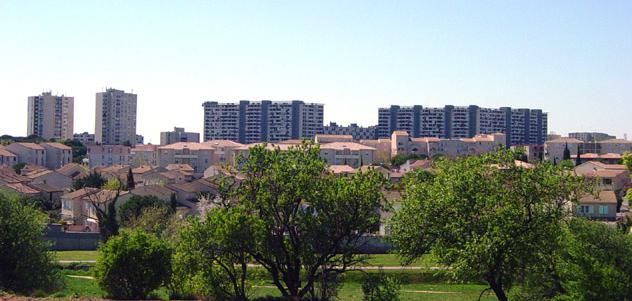
La Devèze in Béziers.

=== Limousin ===
- Tujac, Brive-la-Gaillarde: Established in 1963.
- Vallée des Chers, Guéret: Established in 1966.
- Aurence, Limoges: Established in 1961, built from 1965 to 1970. Architect-urbanist: Clément Tambuté.

=== Lorraine ===
- Faubourg d'Ambrail, Épinal: Architect-urbanist: Émile Deschler.
- Plateau de la Justice, Épinal: Established in 1959, with 1,000 housing units from 1960.
- Rémelange, Fameck (Moselle): Built from 1959 to 1969. Architect-urbanist: Henri-Jean Calsat.
- Wiesberg, Forbach: From 1960.
- Cité-des-Provinces, Laxou, Nancy agglomeration: Established in 1959. Architect-urbanist: Jean-Louis Fayeton.
- Borny, Metz (Moselle): Established on 6 January 1960, with 6,000 housing units built from 1964 to 1973. Architect-urbanist: Jean Dubuisson.
- Val Saint-Martin, Mont-Saint-Martin, near Longwy (Meurthe-et-Moselle): Established in 1961, with 1,600 housing units from 1959. Architect-urbanist: Paul La Mache.
- Vandœuvre-lès-Nancy: Established in 1959, with 8,000 housing units from 1960. Architect-urbanist: Henri-Jean Calsat.
- Cité Verte, Verdun (Meuse): Built from 1957 to 1962 by Jean Fayeton.

=== Midi-Pyrénées ===
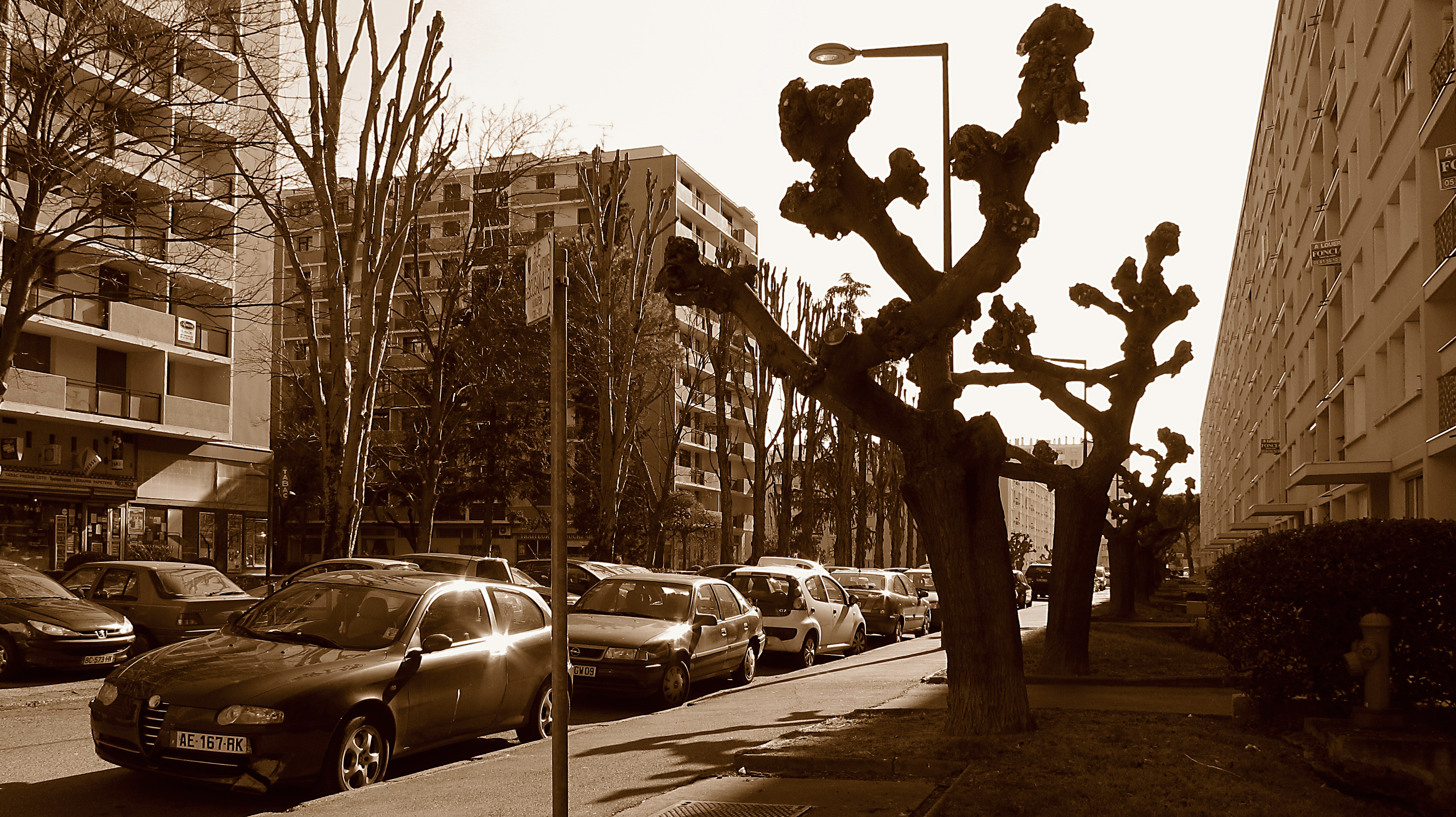
Rangueil district in Toulouse.

- Cantepau, Albi (Tarn): Established in 1967, with 2,000 housing units.
- Garros, Auch (Gers): Established in 1962.
- Labarre, Foix (Ariège): Established in 1968.
- Mazamet and Aussilon (Tarn): Established in 1963.
- Bagatelle, Toulouse: Established in 1961.
- Mirail, Toulouse: Established in 1962. Architect-urbanist: Georges Candilis.
- Rangueil, Toulouse: Established in 1961.

=== Nord-Pas-de-Calais ===
- Mont-Liébaut, Béthune: Established in 1960.
- Beau-Marais, Calais: Established in 1962, completed in 1969, with 6,325 housing units. Architect-urbanist: Yervante Toumaniantz.
- Barre-Vert, Dunkirk: Established in 1960.
- Nouvelles Synthes, Grande-Synthe, near Dunkirk: Established in 1961, with 6,200 housing units built from 1959 to 1980. Architect-urbanists: Gérard Deldique and Yervante Toumaniantz.
- Malo-Centre, now Malo-les-Bains, Dunkirk: Established in 1963.
- Grande-Résidence, Lens: Established in 1964. Architect-urbanist: Jean de Mailly.
- Plaine de Mons, Mons-en-Barœul: Established in 1960. Architect-urbanists: Henri Chomette and Gérard Perpère.
- Petit-Ronchin, Ronchin, Lille agglomeration: Established in 1960.
- Trois Ponts, Roubaix: Established in 1961. Architect-urbanist: Guillaume Gillet.
- Bourgogne, Tourcoing: Established in 1962, built from 1965 to 1975.
- Valenciennes and Aulnoy-lez-Valenciennes: Established in 1960.
- Plaine-de-Beaulieu, Wattrelos: Established in 1960.
- Blanc Riez, Wattignies: Established in 1960. Architect-urbanist: Gérard Deldique.

=== Lower Normandy ===
- Saint-Paterne, now Perseigne, Alençon: Established in 1960.
- Provinces, Octeville, Cherbourg-en-Cotentin: Established in 1960, with 3,233 housing units built from 1963 to 1980. Architect-urbanist: Paul Vimond.
- Chemin Vert, Caen: Established on 19 October 1960, with 4,000 housing units. Architect-urbanist: Marcel Clot.
- La Pierre-Heuzé, Caen: Established on 19 October 1960, with 1,500 housing units.
- Saint-Sauveur, Flers: Established in 1963.
- Hérouville-Saint-Clair, Caen agglomeration: Established on 19 October 1960, with 10,000 housing units.
- Plateau Saint-Jacques, now Hauteville, Lisieux: Established in 1961. Architect-urbanist: Georges Duval.
- Saint-Georges, Saint-Lô: Established in 1960.

=== Upper Normandy ===
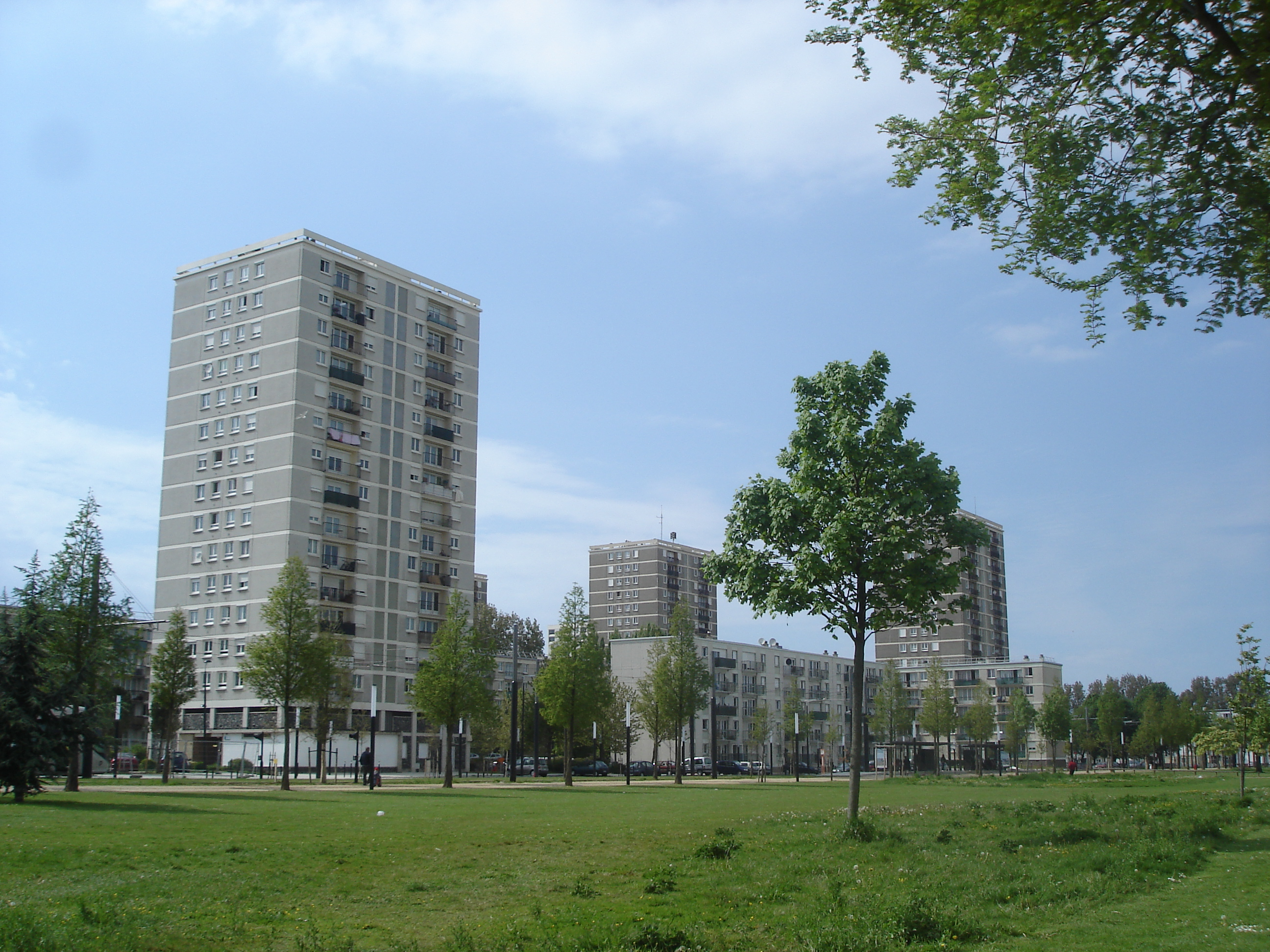
Caucriauville district in Le Havre.

- Bourg Lecomte, Bernay: Established in 1968.
- Canteleu, Rouen agglomeration: Established in 1960. Architect-urbanists: Adrien Brelet and Raoul Leroy.
- La Madeleine, Évreux: Established in 1961. Architect-urbanist: Adrien Brelet.
- Caucriauville or Cité Saint-Pierre, Le Havre: Established in 1960, with 6,000 housing units built from 1959 to 1970. Architect-urbanist: Sonrel-Duthilleul firm.
- Mont-Gaillard, Le Havre: Established in 1968. Architect-urbanist: Gérard Ernoult.
- Belleville-et-Hamelet, Louviers: Established in 1966. Architect-urbanist: Imanuel Wiener.
- Petits Prés, Pont-Audemer: Established in 1966.
- Grand'Mare, Rouen and Bihorel: Established in 1960, expanded in 1964, built from 1960 to 1968.
- Grand-Quevilly, near Rouen: Established in 1961. Architect-urbanists: Louis Arretche and H. Tougard.
- Valmeux, Vernon: Established in 1962.

=== Pays de la Loire ===
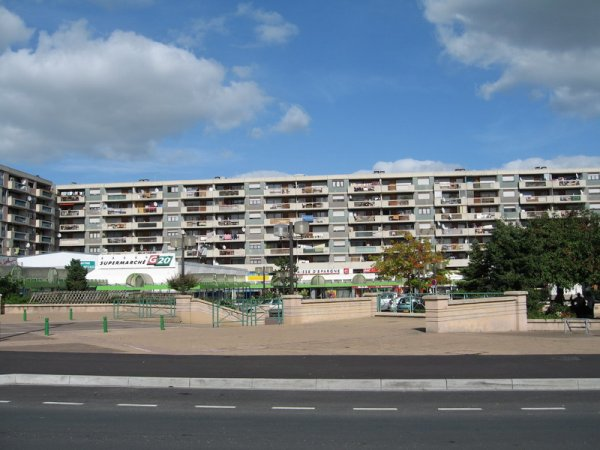
A social housing block in the ZUP of Angers-Sud (La Roseraie district).

- Monplaisir (ZUP Nord-Briollay), Angers: Established on 16 March 1960, covering 83 ha (210 acres), with 2,650 planned housing units; 2,300 built from 1963.
- La Roseraie (ZUP Sud), Angers: Established on 8 July 1965, covering 158 ha (390 acres), with 6,000 planned housing units; 6,500 built from 1966.
- Les Fourches, Laval: Established in 1959.
- Saint-Nicolas-Chartière, now Saint-Nicolas, Laval: Established in 1963. Architect-urbanist: Favette.
- Allonnes, near Le Mans: Established in 1959. Architect-urbanists: Paul Herbé and Jean Le Couteur.
- Sablons-Gazonfier, Le Mans: Established in 1959. Architect-urbanist: Roger Faraut.
- Éraudière and Beaujoire, Nantes: Established in 1963.
- Bellevue, Nantes/Saint-Herblain: Established in 1959. Architect-urbanist: Marcel Favraud.
- Ile-Beaulieu-Malakoff, Nantes: Established in 1961. Architect-urbanist: Fernand Riehl.

=== Picardy ===
- Henriville, also ZUP Sud, Amiens: Established in 1967.
- Nord, Amiens: Established in 1959. Architect-urbanist: Yervante Toumaniantz.
- Nord-Ouest, Etouvie-Montières, Amiens: Architect-urbanists: Yervante Toumaniantz and Claude Guislain.
- Argentine, Beauvais: Architect-urbanist: Jean de Mailly.
- La-Glacière, Compiègne, now Maréchaux: Established in 1960.
- L'Obier, Nogent-sur-Oise, near Creil: Established in 1960.
- Nord, Saint-Siméon, Noyon: Established in 1966.
- Zone Nord-Est, now Europe, Saint-Quentin: Established in 1961.

=== Poitou-Charentes ===
- Ma Campagne, Angoulême: Established in 1966.
- La Forêt, Châtellerault: Established in 1967.
- Plaine-d'Ozon, Châtellerault: Established in 1960. Architect-urbanist: Jean Maneval.
- Saint-Liguaire, now Clou-Bouchet, Niort: Established in 1962. Architect-urbanist: Clade Le Cœur.
- Couronneries, Poitiers: Established on 16 January 1960. Architect-urbanist: André Remondet.
- La Rochelle/Périgny/Aytré, now Villeneuve-les-Salines, La Rochelle: Established in 1966.
- Mireuil-Saint-Maurice, La Rochelle: Established in 1959. Architect-urbanists: Louis Simon and Borja Huidobro.
- Boiffiers, Saintes: Established in 1967.

=== Provence-Alpes-Côte d'Azur ===
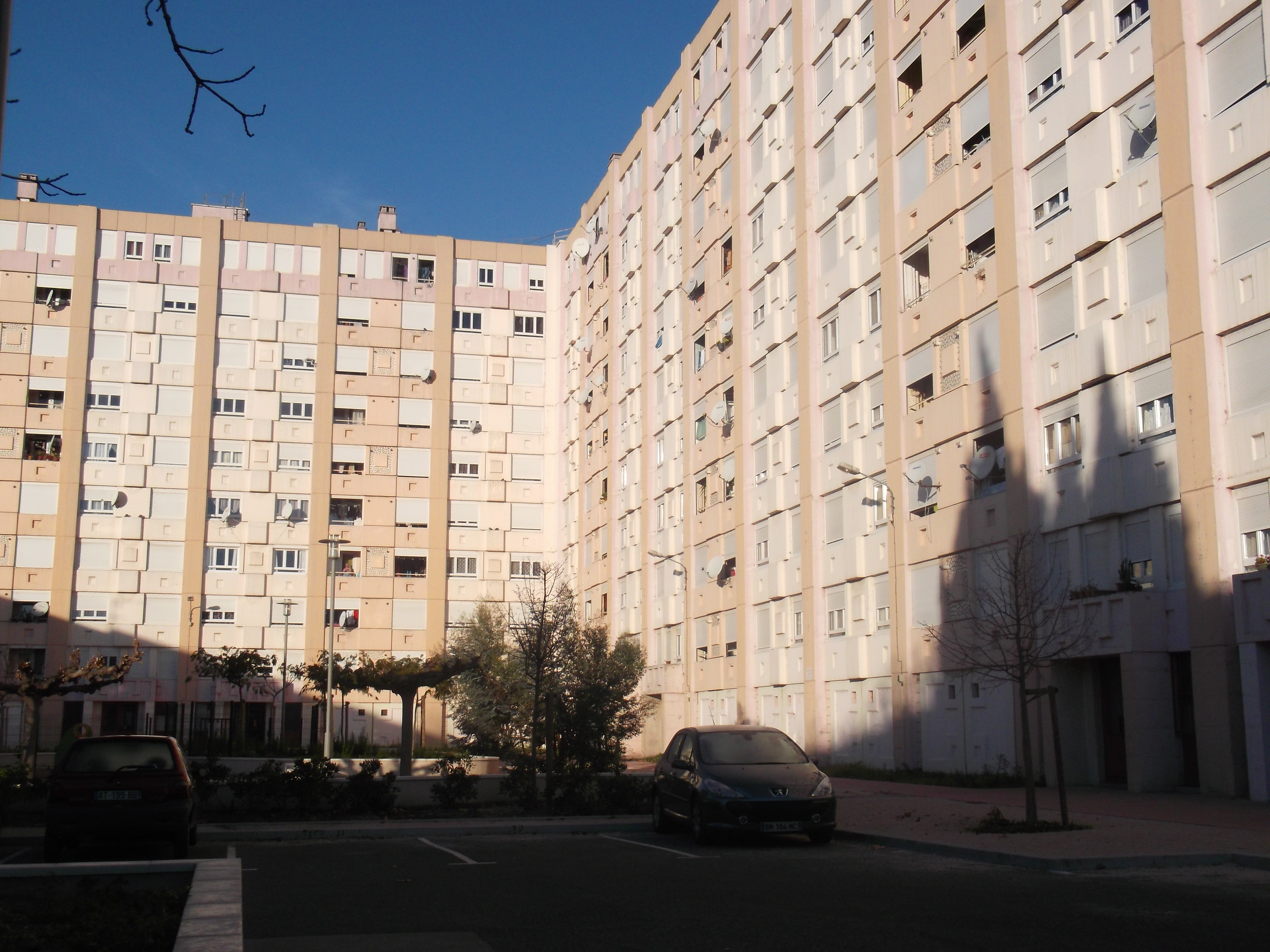
Monclar district in Avignon.

- L'Encagnane, Aix-en-Provence: Built from 1965 to 1971.
- Plan du Bourg, Arles: Established in 1968.
- Monclar, Avignon: Established on 15 April 1960. Architect-urbanist: André Remondet.
- Plateau-Napoléon, Grasse: Established in 1962.
- Le Canet-Malpassé, now Frais-Vallon, Marseille: Built from 1961 to 1970. Architect-urbanist: Guillaume Gillet.
- Les Caillols, Marseille: Established in 1966.
- Canto-Perdrix, Martigues (Bouches-du-Rhône): Established in 1961, built from 1962 to 1970. Architect-urbanists: Michel Ecochard and Guillaume Gillet.
- L'Arenas/Saint-Augustin, Nice, now Moulins district: Established in 1960. Architect-urbanists: Daniel Badani and Paul D'Outreligne.
- Les Canourgues, Salon-de-Provence (Bouches-du-Rhône): Established in 1966.
- Berthe, La Seyne-sur-Mer: Established in 1960.
- La Rode, Toulon: 1,520 housing units built from 1960. Architect-urbanist: S. Mikelian.

=== Rhône-Alpes ===
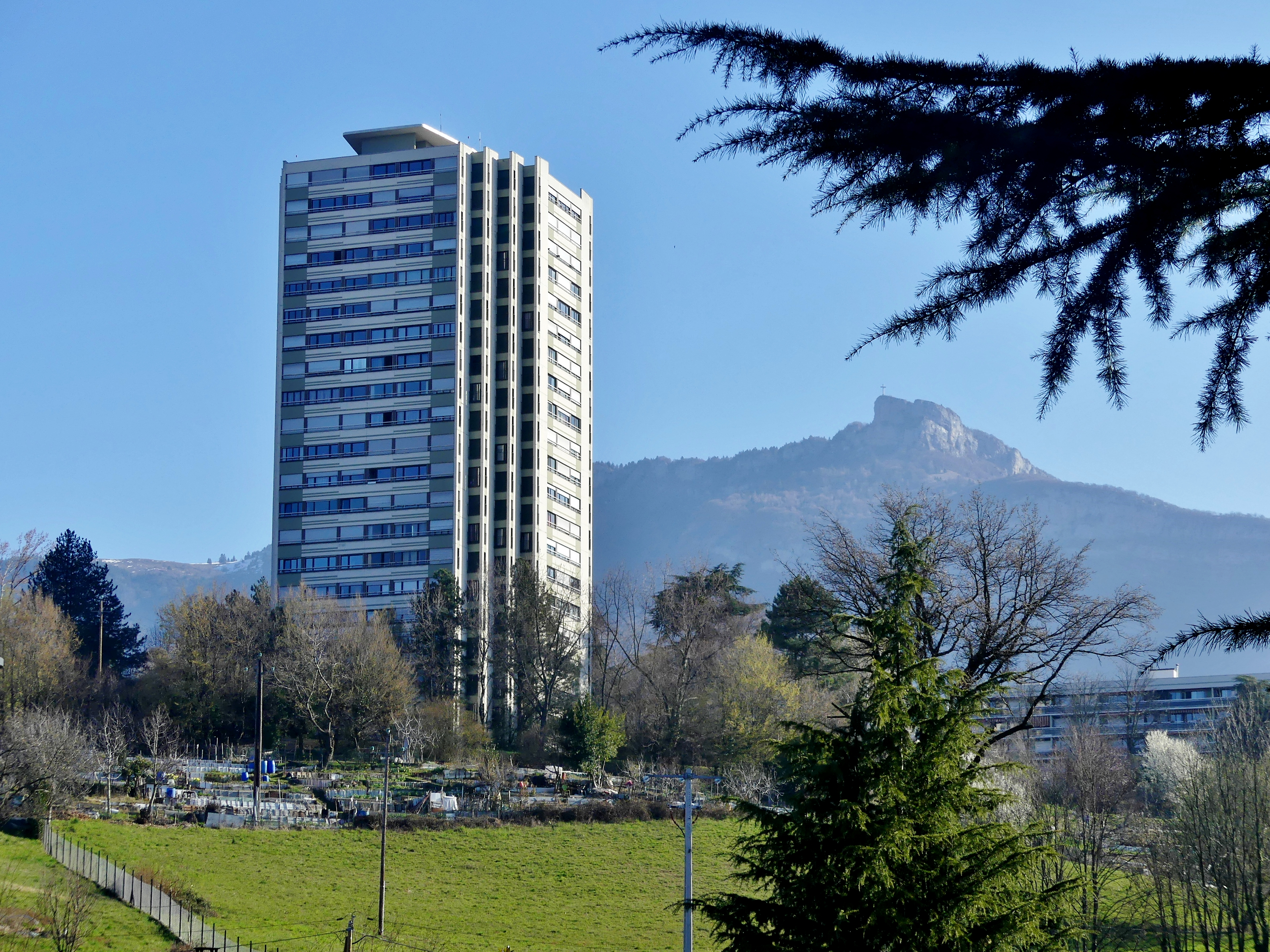
Hauts-de-Chambéry district in Chambéry.

- Novel-Teppes, Annecy: Architect-urbanist: Maurice Novarina.
- La Varde, Annecy-le-Vieux, Annecy agglomeration: Established in 1966.
- Reyssouze, Bourg-en-Bresse (Ain): Established in 1959, expanded in 1964. Architect-urbanist: Jean Royer.
- Chambéry-le-Haut, Chambéry: Built from 1963 to 1977. Architect-urbanist: Jean Dubuisson.
- Chazeau-Bruneaux, Firminy, Saint-Étienne agglomeration: Established in 1968.
- Villeneuve, Grenoble and Échirolles: Established in 1961, with 6,650 housing units (4,200 in Grenoble, 2,450 in Échirolles) built from 1973 to 1980. Urbanist: Henry Bernard; architects for Échirolles: Georges Bovet, Joly, Guy Pison; architects for Grenoble’s Arlequin: AUA, Loiseau, and Tribel.
- Guilherand, now Guilherand-Granges, Valence agglomeration: Established in 1964.
- Pierrelatte (Drôme): 2,400 housing units built from 1960. Architect-urbanist: J.M. Lafon.
- Fonsala, Saint-Chamond (Loire): Built from 1965.
- Montreynaud, Saint-Étienne (Loire): Built from 1966 to 1977.
- Saint-Genis-Pouilly (Ain): Established in 1967.
- Champ-Fleuri, Seynod, Annecy agglomeration: Built from 1969.
- Valence-le-Haut (Fontbarlette-Le Plan), Valence: 1,917 housing units built from 1963 to 1976. Architect-urbanist: André Gomis.
- Rillieux-Crépieux, now Ville Nouvelle, Rillieux-la-Pape (Rhône): Established in 1959, built in the 1970s, with 6,275 housing units. Architect-urbanists: Joseph Maillet and Jean Poupon.
- Vaulx-en-Velin (Rhône): Established in 1963, with 8,300 housing units built from 1970 to 1980. Architect-urbanists: Carrot and Charles Delfante.
- Minguettes, Vénissieux: 9,200 housing units built from 1965 to 1973. Architect-urbanist: Eugène Beaudouin, with Bornarel and Frank Grimal.
- Vernaison, Lyon agglomeration: Established in 1963. Architect-urbanist: Eugène Beaudouin.

== See also ==
- Social housing in France
- Housing estate
- Urban planning
- Public housing
- Planned community
- Le Corbusier
- Urban renewal
- Slum clearance
- Suburb
- Modern architecture

== Bibliography ==
- Monnier, Gérard; Klein, Richard (2002). Les années ZUP, architectures de la croissance (1960-1973) [The ZUP Years, Architectures of Growth (1960–1973)] (in French). Picard. p. 302. ISBN 978-2-7084-0657-5.
- Biarez, S. (1972). "Les zones à urbaniser en priorité : logique et contradictions" [Priority Urbanization Zones: Logic and Contradictions]. Bulletin de l'Institut international d'administration publique (in French) (24): 756.
