= Church of Saint Louis (Oran) =

- Église Saint-Louis
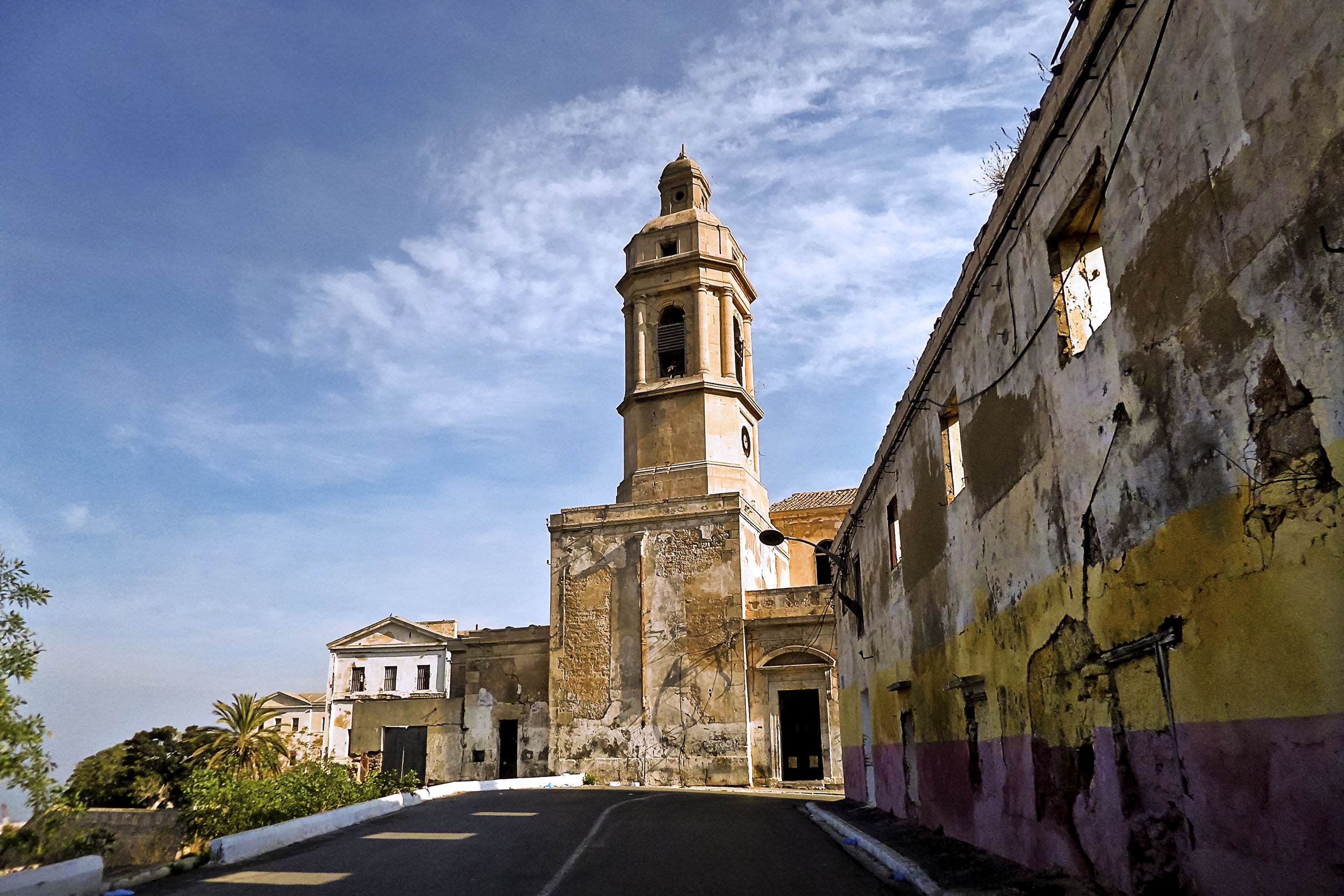
- Church of Saint Louis
- 35.70519°N 0.65444°W
- Location: Oran
- Country: Algeria
- Denomination: Catholic Church

History
- Former name(s): Santa Maria de las Victorias; Sainte-Marie-de-la-Patience

Architecture
- Architectural type: Church

The Church of Saint Louis (French: L'église Saint-Louis) is a Catholic church in the city of Oran, Algeria, formerly a mosque before its conversion by the Spaniards.

== History ==
It was formerly a mosque, converted into a church by Cardinal Cisneros in 1509, as a result of the Spanish conquest of Oran. It was then named Santa-Maria-de-las-Victorias and underwent renovations to become a chapel. The first capture of the city by the Regency of Algiers (1708–1732) led it back towards Muslim or Jewish worship, according to some sources.

The second cathedral of Oran, le Sacré-Cœur, inaugurated in 1913, supplanted as the city's cathedral the building which henceforth became known as the Saint Louis d'Oran church.

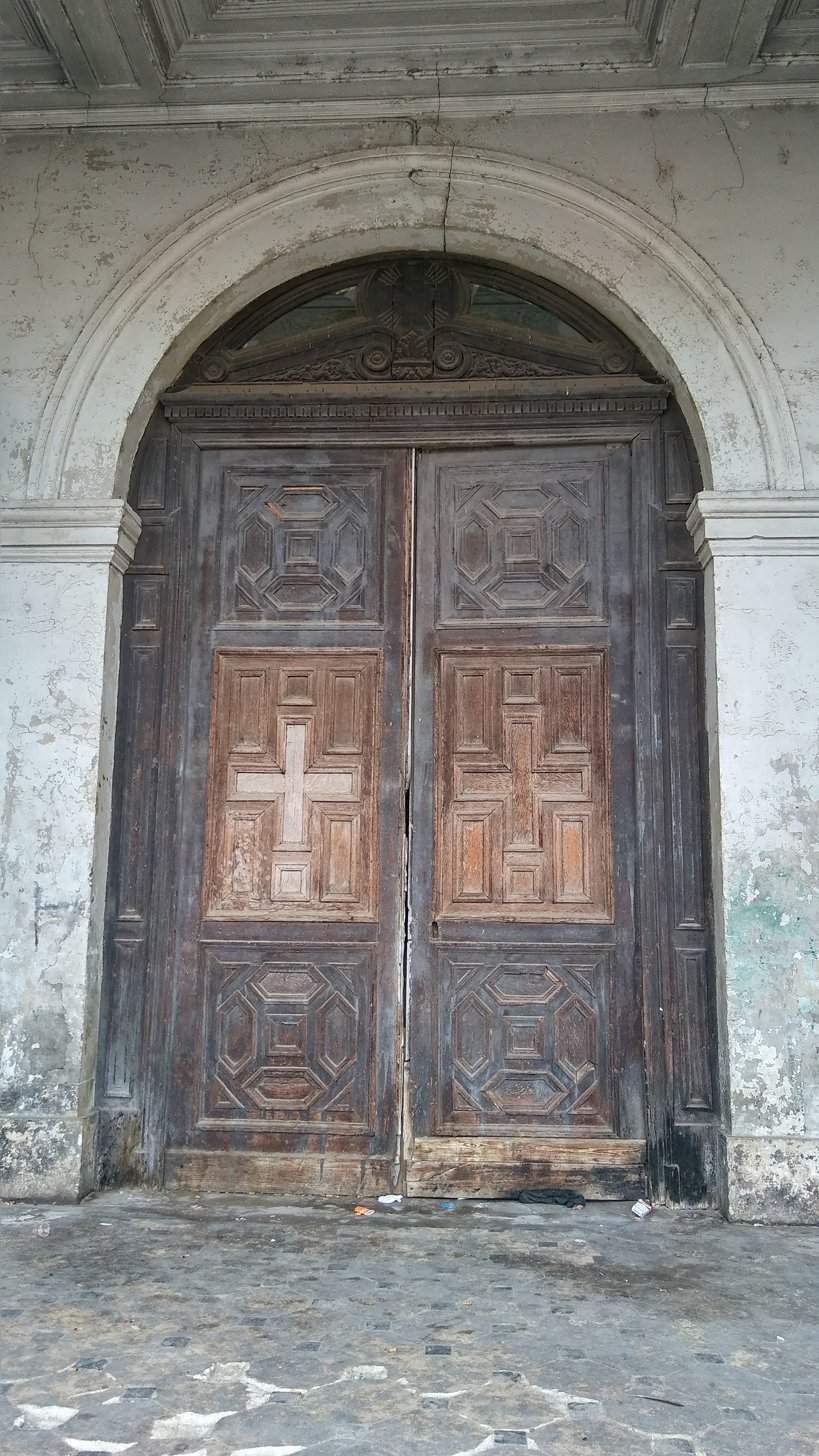
Entrance

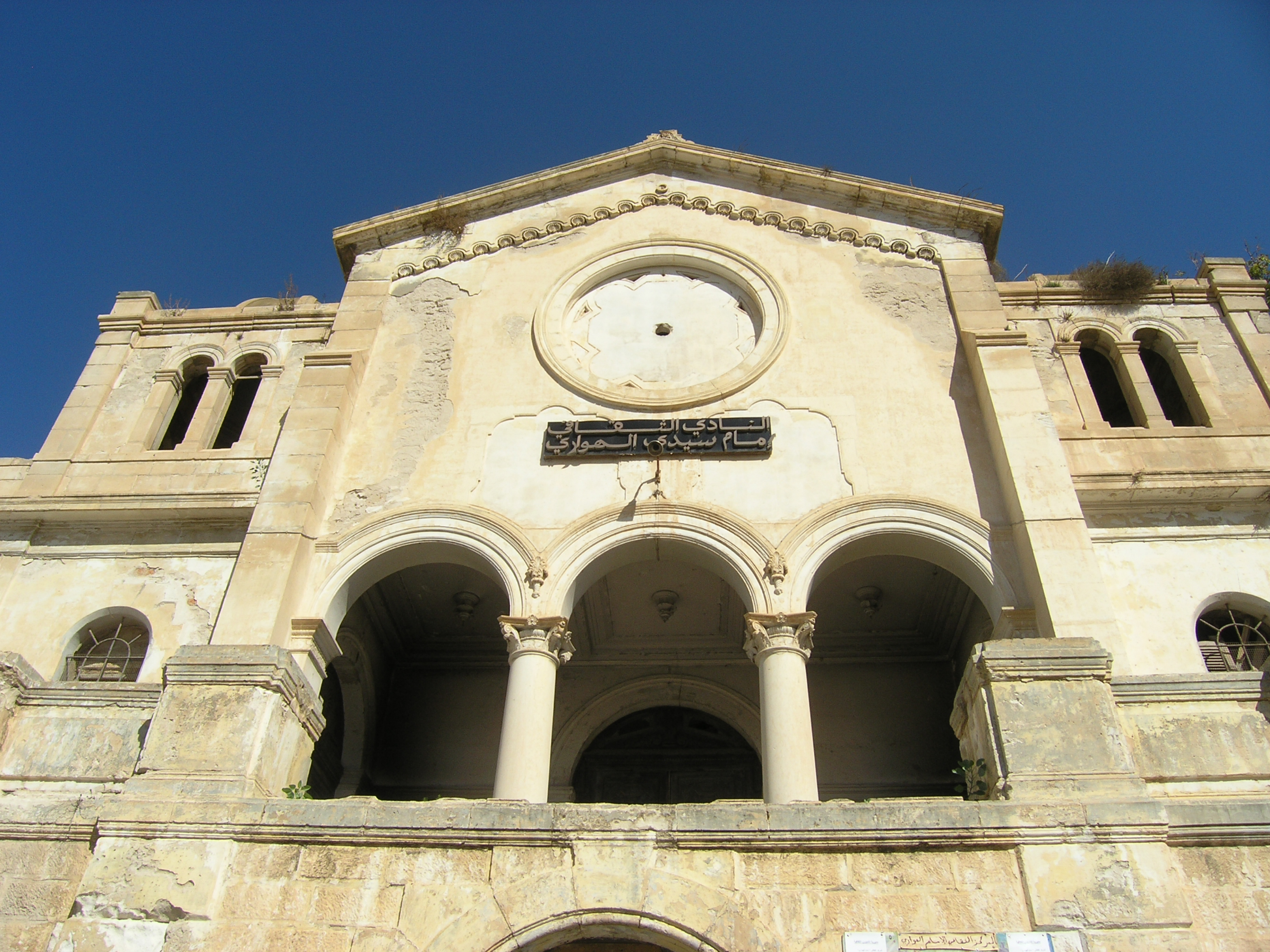
Main façade

== Bibliography ==
- Abadie, Louis (2002). Oran et Mers el Kebir (in French). SERRE EDITEUR. p. 128. ISBN 978-2-906431-53-9.
- Senhadji, Dalila (15 January 2019), "L'église Saint-Louis, un site « fantôme » de l'histoire d'Oran. Note de recherche", Fabrique du tourisme et expériences patrimoniales au Maghreb, XIXe – XXIe siècles, Description du Maghreb, Centre Jacques-Berque, ISBN 979-10-92046-37-3
- Terki Hassaine, Ismet (2004-06-30). "Oran au xviiie siècle : du désarroi à la clairvoyance politique de l'Espagne". Insaniyat / إنسانيات. Revue algérienne d'anthropologie et de sciences sociales (in French). 23–24 (23–24): 197–222. doi:10.4000/insaniyat.5625. ISSN 1111-2050.
