= Cathédrale du Sacré-Cœur d'Alger =

Cathedral in Algiers, Algeria

Sacred Heart Cathedral of Algier كاتدرائية القلب الأقدس Cathédrale du Sacré-Cœur d'Alger
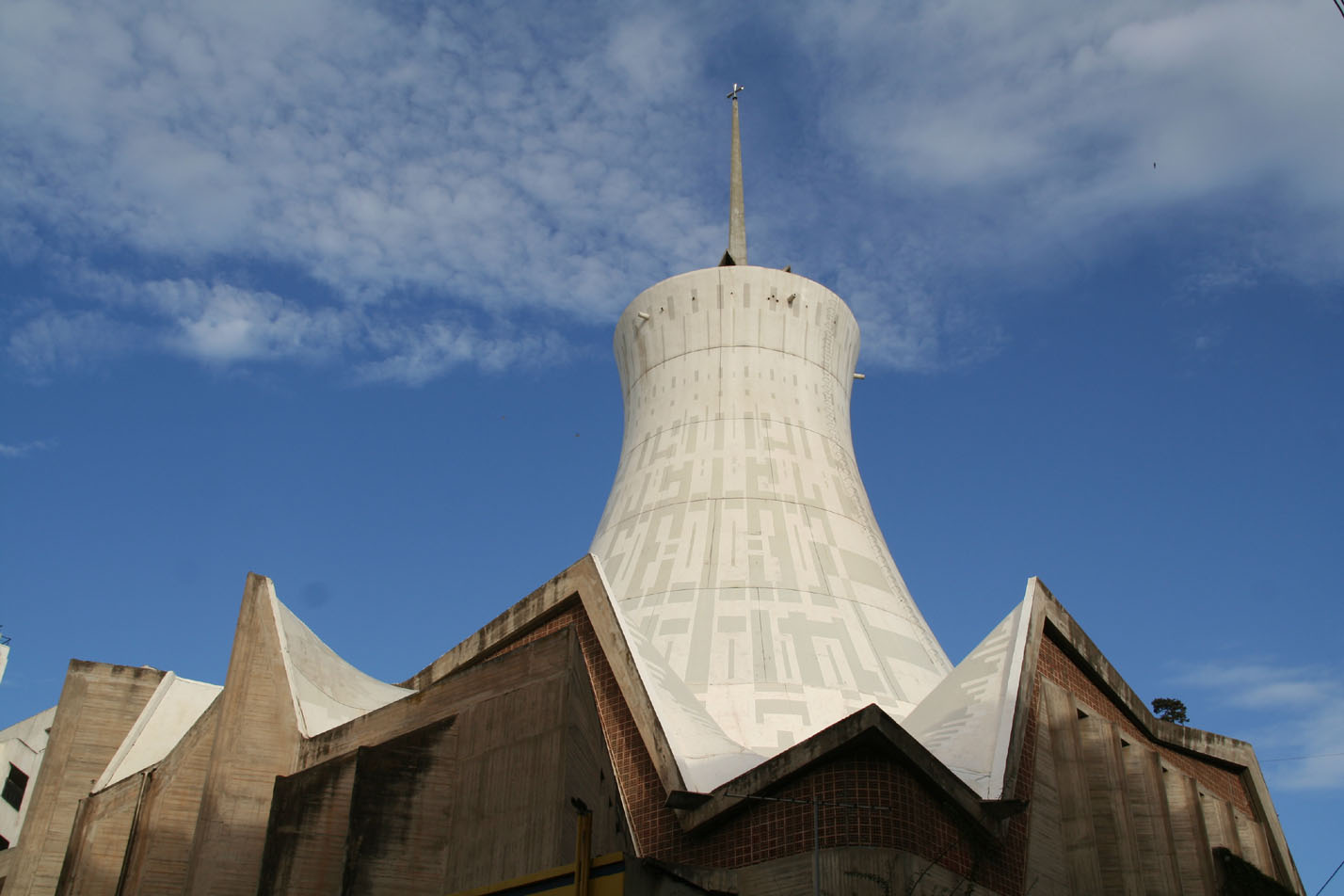
- Sacred Heart Cathedral of Algiers

Religion
- Affiliation: Roman Catholic Church
- Province: Archdiocese of Alger
- Rite: Roman Rite
- Ecclesiastical or organizational status: Cathedral
- Leadership: Jean-Paul Vesco
- Year consecrated: 1963

Location
- Location: Algiers, Algeria
- Interactive map of Sacred Heart Cathedral of Algier كاتدرائية القلب الأقدس; Cathédrale du Sacré-Cœur d'Alger
- Coordinates: 36°45′51″N 03°02′52″E

Architecture
- Architects: Paul Herbé, Jean Le Couteur
- Type: Church
- Style: Modern
- Completed: 1956

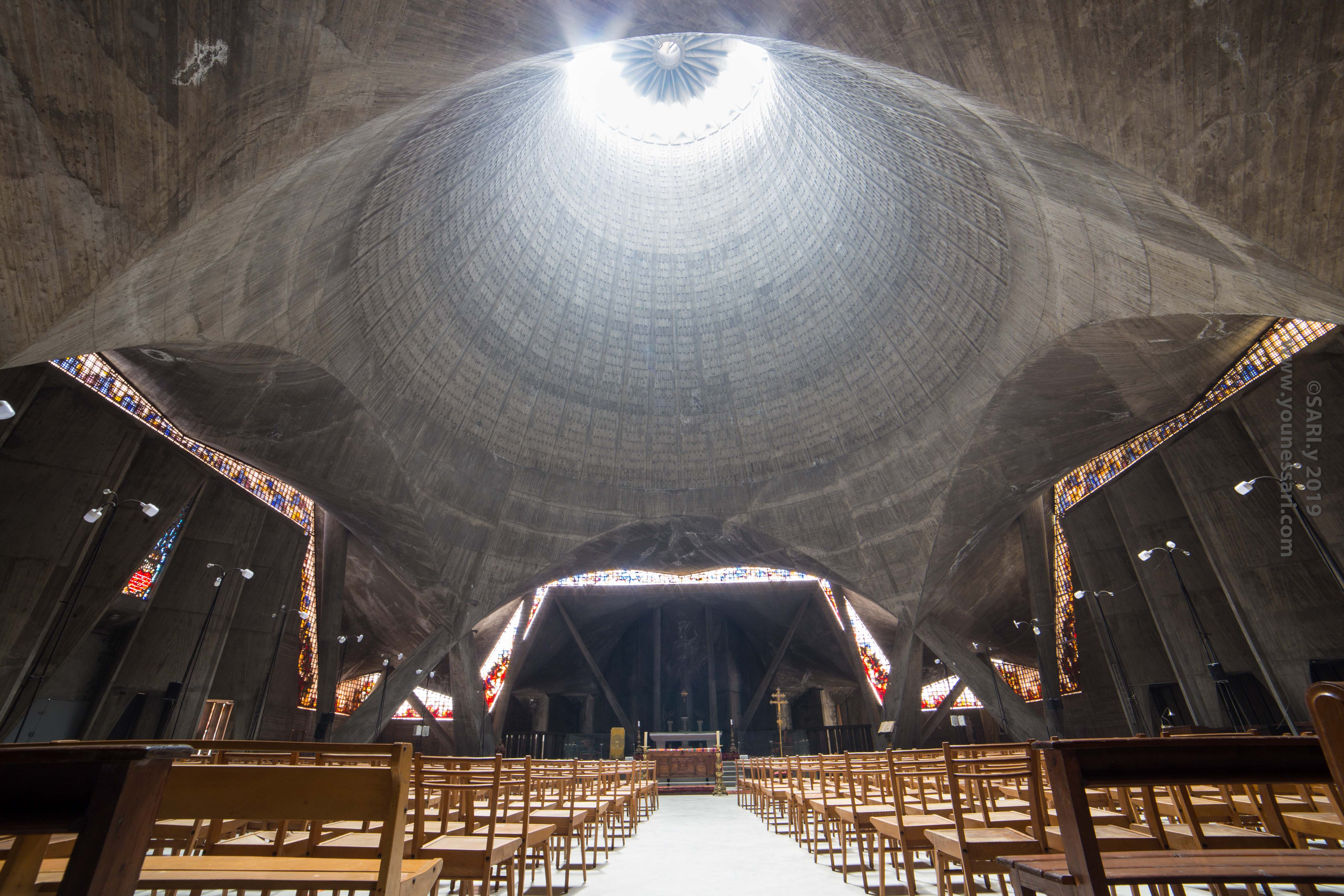
The dome

Cathédrale du Sacré-Cœur d'Alger (Sacred Heart Cathedral of Algiers) is a Roman Catholic church located in Algiers, Algeria. Completed in 1956, it became the new cathedral in the capital after the Cathedral of Saint Philip of Algiers reconverted into a Muslim Ketchaoua Mosque. The Cathédrale du Sacré-Cœur d'Alger is the cathedral church of the Archdiocese of Algiers.

Construction of the church began after a wish of Bishop Leynaud in 1944. It was elevated to a cathedral in December 1962 and consecrated in 1963. The designers of the building, Paul Herbé and Jean Le Couteur, along with engineer René Sarger, were inspired by the Gospel of John. Its nave measures 52 metres (171 feet) long and 35 metres (115 feet) wide. The church is noted for its central tower.

At the entrance to the nave there are small organs offered by the parish of Boufarik opposite which is a mosaic. The mural dates to 324, from the first Roman basilica of Castellum Tingitanum (Chlef). The altar is made of Carrara marble, and houses the relics of numerous African saints.

== See also ==
- Cathédrale du Sacré-Cœur d'Oran
- Pro-Cathedral of Ghardaïa
