= Musée national des Arts et Traditions Populaires (France) =

Museum in Paris, France, 1937–2005

Coordinates: 48°52′38″N 2°16′4″E

The Musée national des Arts et Traditions Populaires was a museum of the popular arts and traditions of France. It was located in a building at 6, avenue du Mahatma Gandhi, Paris, France, which was closed to the public in 2005. Its collections were transferred to the Musée des Civilisations de l'Europe et de la Méditerranée in Marseille.

The museum was created in 1937 by Georges-Henri Rivière as the French section of the Trocadéro's Musée de l'Homme, in the basement of which it was open in 1951. In 1969 it moved to its own building, designed by architect Jean Dubuisson and set beside the Jardin d'Acclimatation (Porte des Sablons) in the Bois de Boulogne. Over the years its initial focus on traditional agricultural France broadened to include contemporary urban culture and popular entertainment (notably circus) with collections of French crafts and peasant civilisation, home furniture, agricultural tools, industrial and artisanal items, photographs and printed materials, and costumes.

In 2017, the City of Paris decided to revamp and partially redesign its original building in the Bois de Boulogne (which had been left vacant), and relocate the collections of the Musée des Arts et Traditions Populaires in their original home. The work on the building will be privately financed by the Group LVMH, and led by the architect Frank Gehry, with the collaboration of Thomas Dubuisson, grandson of the original architect, Jean Dubuisson. The building was slated to reopen in 2020, but as of 2026 it remains under construction.

== See also ==
- List of museums in Paris
