= Paul Herbé =

French architect

Paul Charles Auguste Herbé
- Born: October 15, 1903; Reims, Champagne-Ardenne, France
- Died: August 25, 1963 (aged 59); Paris, France
- Occupation: Architect
- Known for: Cathédrale du Sacré-Cœur d'Alger

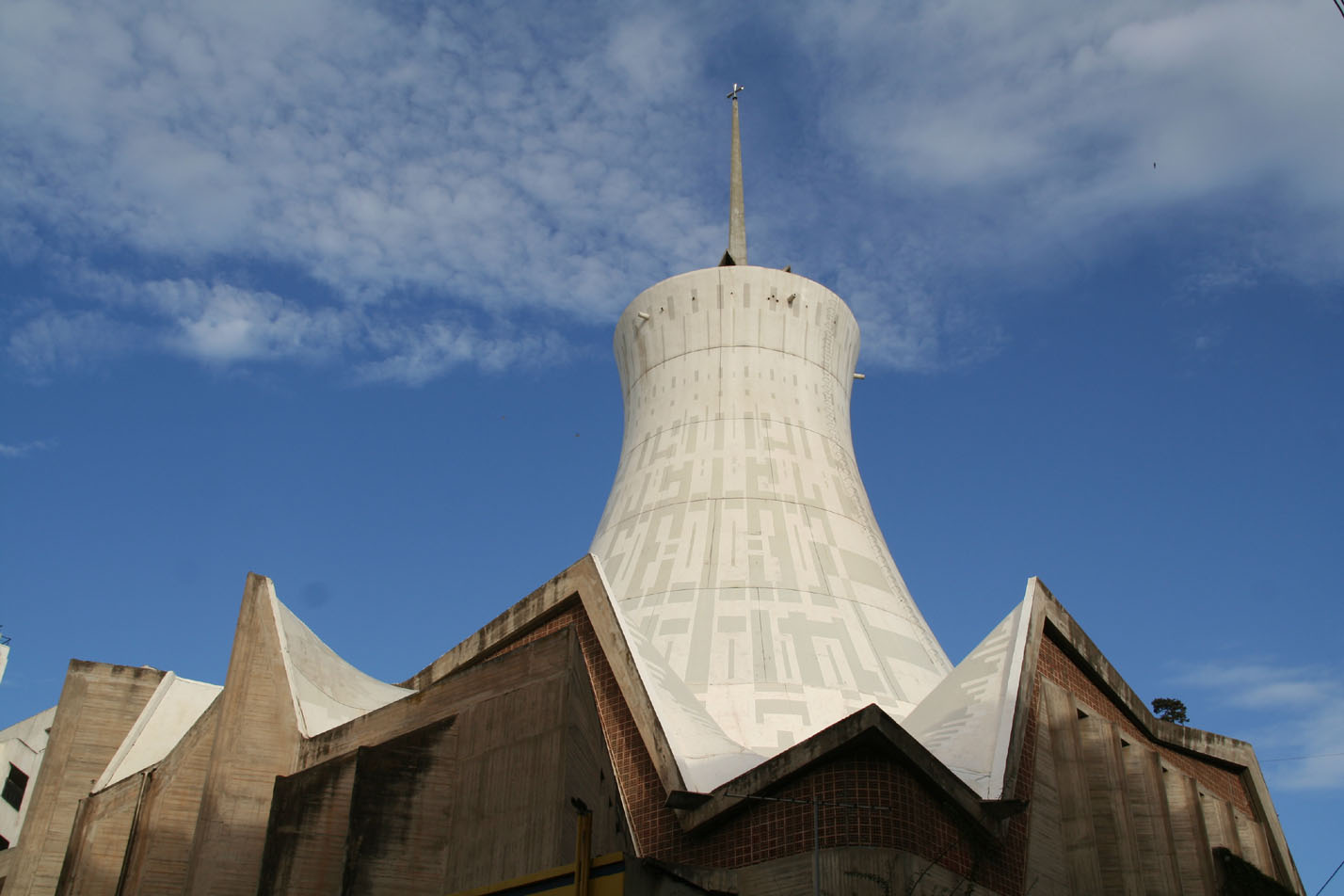
Cathédrale du Sacré-Cœur d'Alger created with Jean Le Couteur

Paul Charles Auguste Herbé (15 October 1903 - 25 August 1963) was a French architect.

== Early years ==
Paul Charles Augustus Herbé was born in Reims on 15 October 1903, son of Edmond Herbé and brother of Jacques Herbé, also architects. He studied under Emmanuel Pontremoli at the École nationale supérieure des Beaux-Arts in Paris. He gained his certificate as an architect and town planner in 1934.

== Career ==
Herbé's first significant project as an independent architect was in 1933 when he and Robert Camelot he won the design competition for a girls' school in Beaune, France. He won second prize in a competition for the Exhibition of 1937 in la Défense, Paris, with Robert Auzelle, Robert Camelot, Jean de Mailly and Bernard Zehrfuss. He and Camelot designed the Ceramics pavilion for this fair.

During World War II Herbé moved to Tunisia, where in 1943 he collaborated with Bernard Zehrfuss. From 1945 he was the chief consulting architect in the Tunisian government's department of architecture and town planning, headed by Bernard Zehrfuss, where he directed reconstruction work in keeping with traditional architectural styles. He later worked with Michael Patout for two years at Sidi-Bou-Said in Tunisia. In 1948 he and Patout created the Villa Kagan-Renaud at Sidi-Bou-Said. After World War II he built a mock Roman Villa in Thuburnica, Tunisia, which he built for a wealthy farmer.

In 1948 Herbé was appointed the city planner for Sudan and Niger. Working with Jean Le Couteur, with whom he continued to be associated until his death, he worked on projects such as Bamako and Niamey (1949–1950), Villeneuve-la-Garenne (1949–1950), a college in Dakar (1951). After returning to France in 1951 he became chief architect of the Ministry of Reconstruction and Urbanism. Herbé was the main architect for the exhibition center of Lille in 1951, with Jean Prouvé. With Jean Le Couteur he was responsible for the hospital at Fort Lamy in Chad (1953) and the Cathédrale du Sacré-Cœur d'Alger of Algiers (1955–1961).

Herbé was responsible for several groups of housing in Bagneux, Massy, Louveciennes, Sevran and Ermont. He was one of the authors of the first development plan for la Défense, in Paris, submitted in 1958. He succeeded Auguste Perret as a studio head at the National School of Fine Arts. The studio headed by Herbé and Edouard Albert was one of the more progressive of those at the Beaux-Arts, and it was there that Jean-Paul Jungmann and Antoine Stinco of "pneumatique" fame were taught in the early 1960s. He was also a member of the UAM.
