= Albert Ballu =

French architect (1849-1939)

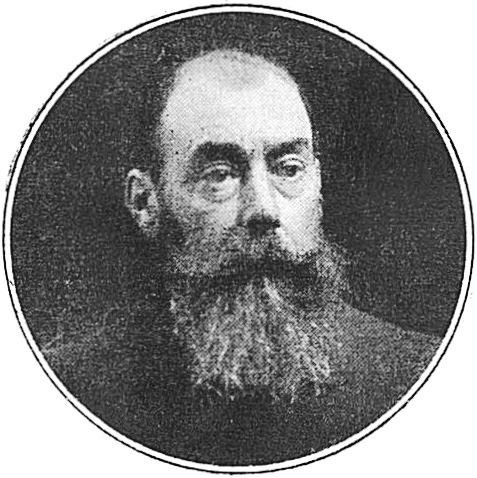
- Born: 1 June 1849; Paris, France
- Died: 3 November 1939 (aged 90); Paris, France
- Education: École nationale supérieure des Beaux-Arts
- Occupation: Architect
- Parent: Théodore Ballu

Signature
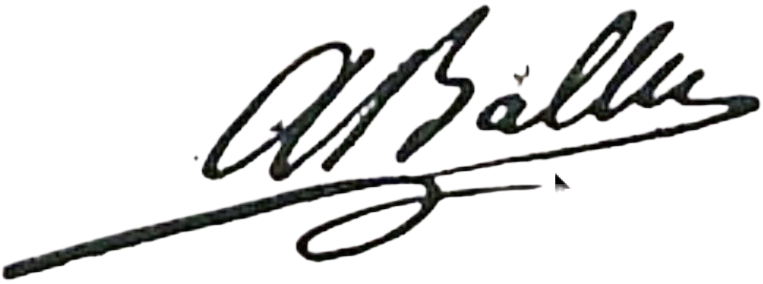

Albert Ballu (1 June 1849 - 3 November 1939) was a French architect. He designed many buildings in French Algeria, including the Cathédrale du Sacré-Cœur d'Oran.

== Education and early career ==
Albert Ballu was the son of an architect, Théodore Ballu (1817–1885), who designed several churches in Paris and who from 1860 was head of public works for the city of Paris. Albert entered the École nationale supérieure des Beaux-Arts in 1868. He was a student of Auguste Magne and his father. After graduating he assisted his father and participated in various competitions for public architecture. He was employed by the Church for the restoration of religious buildings, first in Aix-en-Provence and then in Algiers, where in the 1880s he conducted a survey of local architecture, notably mosques and palaces.

== Work in Algeria ==
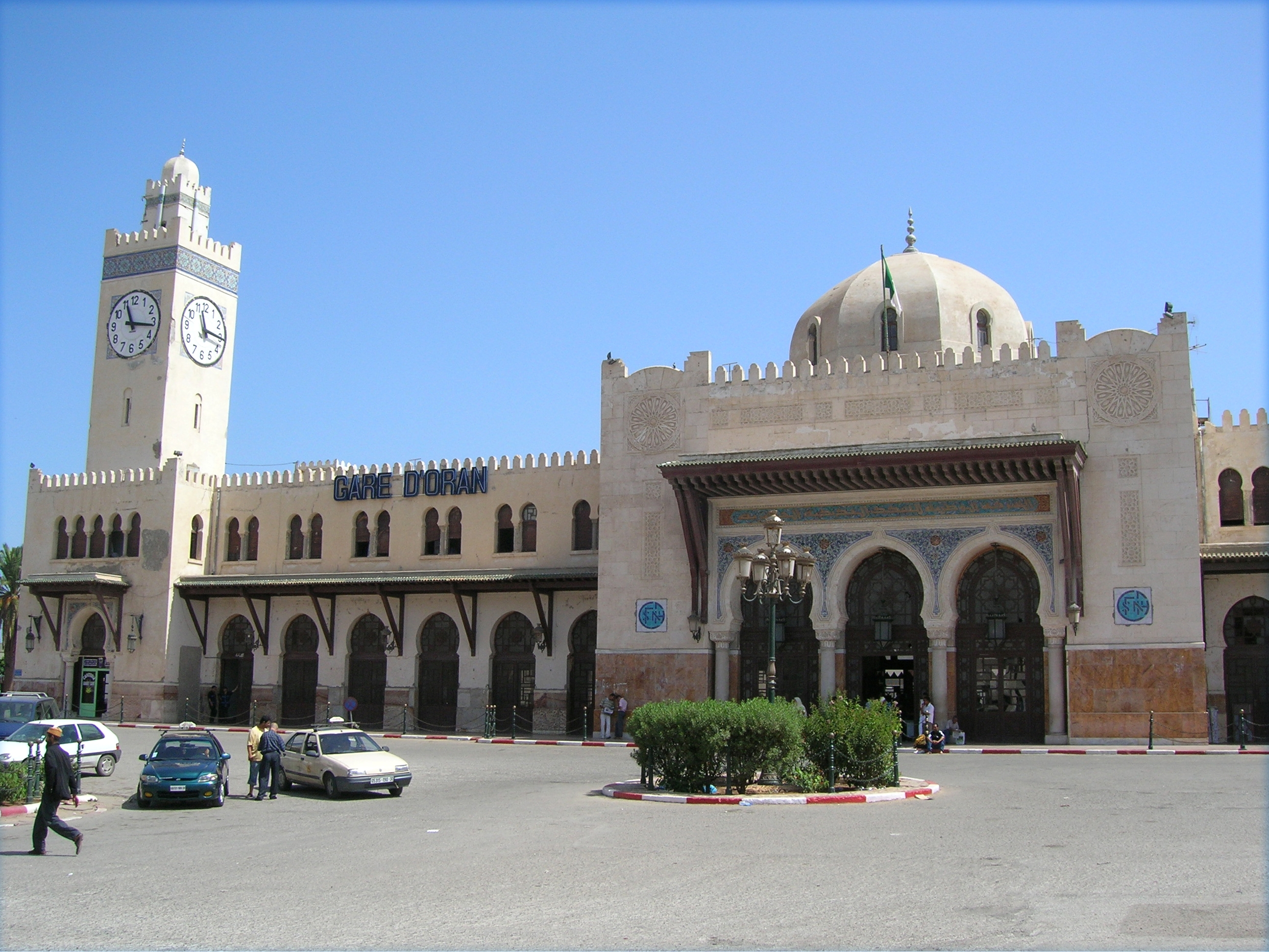
Railway station in Oran

In 1889 he succeeded Edmond Duthoit as chief architect of the historical monuments department in Algeria, a position which he held for 30 years. Like his predecessor, Ballu was an advocate of regionalism and protection of the local heritage. He designed the Algerian pavilions and a reproduction of an Algerian town for the Paris Expositions 1889 and 1900. He participated in and from 1889 directed the excavations of the ancient Roman cities of Djémila and Timgad.

Among his major architectural works in Algeria were the central railway station and cathedral in Oran, both of which were early works in reinforced concrete built by the firm of Auguste Perret and brothers. In the 1890s he also designed the French Renaissance Revival style Palace of Justice in Bucharest.

== Selected publications ==
- Le monastère byzantin de Tébessa. Paris: Ernest Leroux. 1897. p. 38.
- Les ruines de Timgad (antique Thamugadi). Vol. 1. Paris: Ernest Leroux. 1897. OL 7186011M.
- Les ruines de Timgad (antique Thamugadi). Vol. 2. Paris: Ernest Leroux. 1903.
- Guide illustré de Timgad (antique Thamugadi). Paris: Neurdein frères. 1910.
- Ruines de Djemila (antique Cuicul). Algiers: Impr.-libr. Jules Carbonel. 1921.
