= Jean Le Couteur =

French architect

John Le Couteur
- Born: June 10, 1916; Brest, Brittany, France
- Died: May 30, 2010 (aged 93); Paris, France
- Occupation: Architect
- Known for: Cathédrale du Sacré-Cœur d'Alger

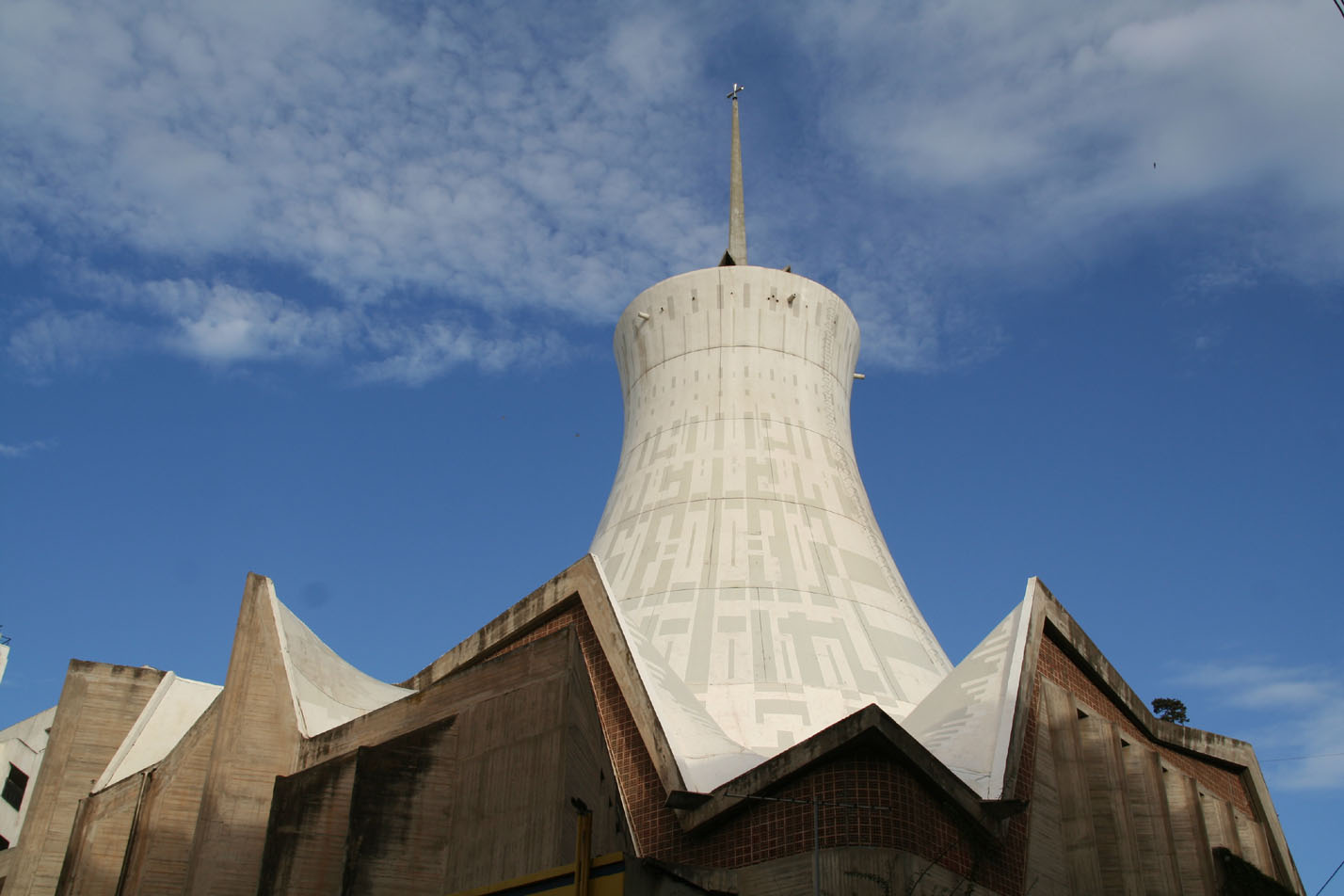
Cathédrale du Sacré-Cœur d'Alger created with Paul Herbé

John Le Couteur (10 June 1916 – 30 May 2010) was a notable French architect, a long-time associate of Paul Herbé.

== Early years ==
Le Couteur was born in Brest, Brittany, on 10 June 1916, the son of a naval doctor. He had a talent for drawing and enrolled in the school of Georges Lefort in Rennes. In 1939 he joined the studio of Auguste Perret at the École nationale supérieure des Beaux-Arts in Paris, but the outbreak of World War II interrupted his schooling. After being mobilized, he returned to the occupied zone and returned to the studio before joining a community of students from the Beaux-Arts in the abandoned village of Oppède in the Vaucluse. He returned to Paris in 1943, where he met Bernard Zehrfuss. He qualified as an architect in 1944, and became a friend of Zehrfuss's friend Paul Herbé.

== Later career ==
In 1945 Zehrfuss, then heading the department of Architecture and Urban Planning in Tunisia, hired Le Couteur as an architect to work on a series of public buildings using standard plans. He kept this position until the end of 1946. He then established his own firm in Bizerte, building his first major work, the Notre-Dame-de-France (1948-1953), which was inspired by Auguste Perret. Between 1947 and 1948 he worked with Herbé in sub-Saharan Africa on projects in Bamako (Sudan) and Niamey (Niger). The two architects suggested to Jean Prouvé the prefabricated "Tropic" metal house design to meet the requirements of tropical climates.

Le Couteur and Herbé formed an official partnership in 1949, working on a variety of projects while based in the Ministry of Reconstruction and Urbanism (MRU). The MRU provided a reliable source of work. Working with Herbé he created works such as the hospital in N'Djamena (1953) and in 1955 the Cathedral of the Sacred Heart of Algiers. The two created the design for the 100,000-seat stadium at Vincennes (1962-1963).

In 1962 he participated in the development of Languedoc-Roussillon as planner and chief architect of the resort of Cap d'Agde. After Herbé died in 1963, Le Couteur created the French Pavilion at the Osaka World Fair (1969), and built many housing estates. Other achievements included the Maison de la Culture at Reims (1961-1969), the University of Antananarivo in Madagascar (1961-1972), the University of Amiens and the Agora in Évry. Married in 1954, he had four children. Jean Le Couteur died in Paris on 30 May 2010.
