= Cathédrale du Sacré-Cœur d'Oran =

Former cathedral in Oran, Algeria

Coordinates: 35°42′01″N 00°38′47″W

Sacred Heart Cathedral of Oran Cathédrale du Sacré-Cœur d'Oran
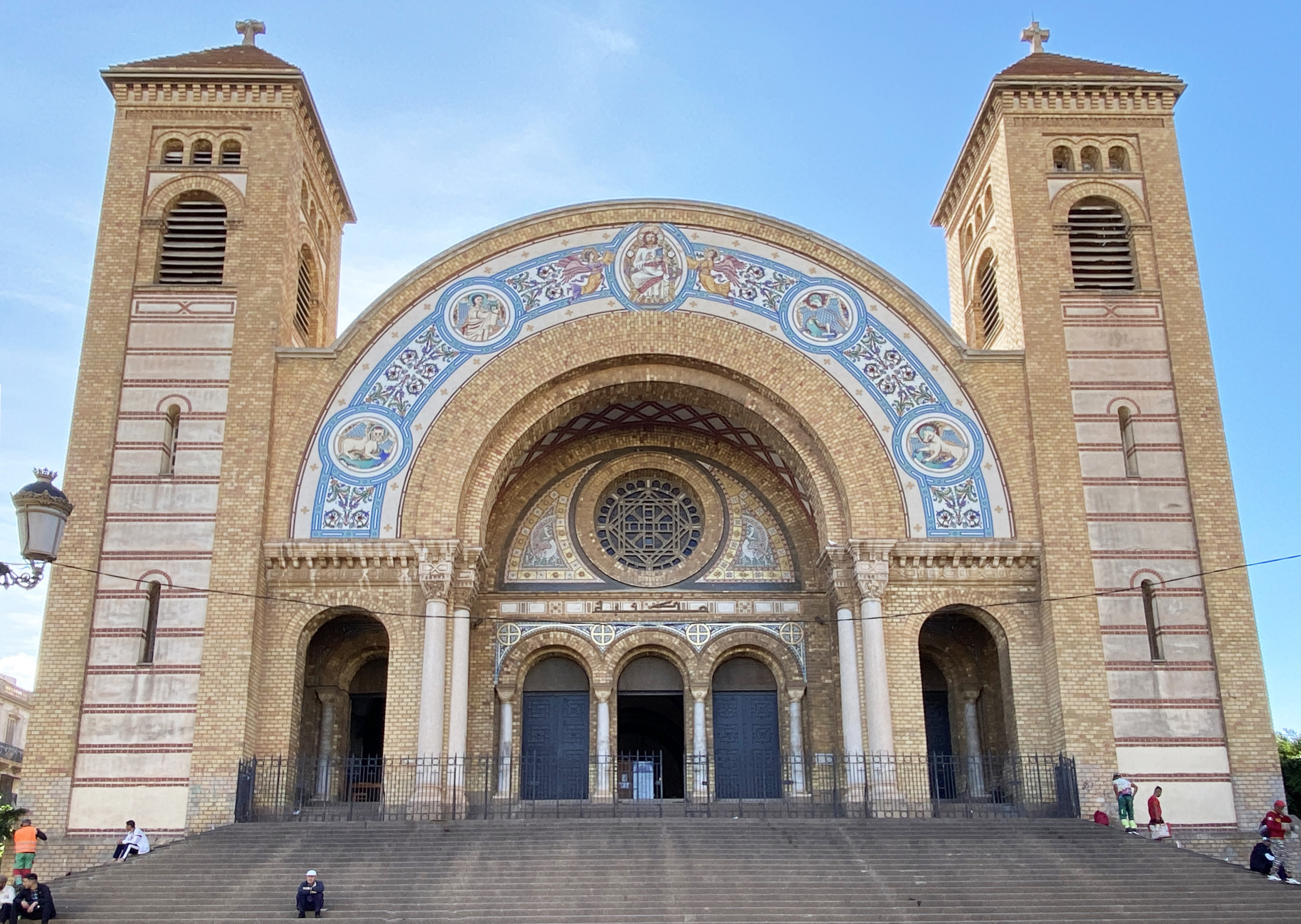
- Oran Cathedral

Religion
- Affiliation: Roman Catholic Church
- Ecclesiastical or organisational status: Cathedral
- Year consecrated: 30 April 1930
- Status: Deconsecrated

Location
- Location: Oran, Algeria
- Interactive map of Sacred Heart Cathedral of Oran; Cathédrale du Sacré-Cœur d'Oran

Architecture
- Type: Church
- Style: Neo-Byzantine
- Completed: 1913

Cathédrale du Sacré-Cœur d'Oran (Sacred Heart Cathedral of Oran) is a former Roman Catholic church located at Place de la Kahina, on Boulevard Hammou-boutlelis, in Oran, Algeria.

== History ==
The church building was built between 1903 and 1913 to the design of Albert Ballu, the architect of the Government of Algeria, and by the company of Auguste and Gustave Perret. The structure of the church itself is of reinforced concrete, which made it the first church built out of this in French overseas territories. It was dedicated on 30 April 1930.

The cathedral became a regional library in 1984, then a public library in 1996.

== Gallery ==
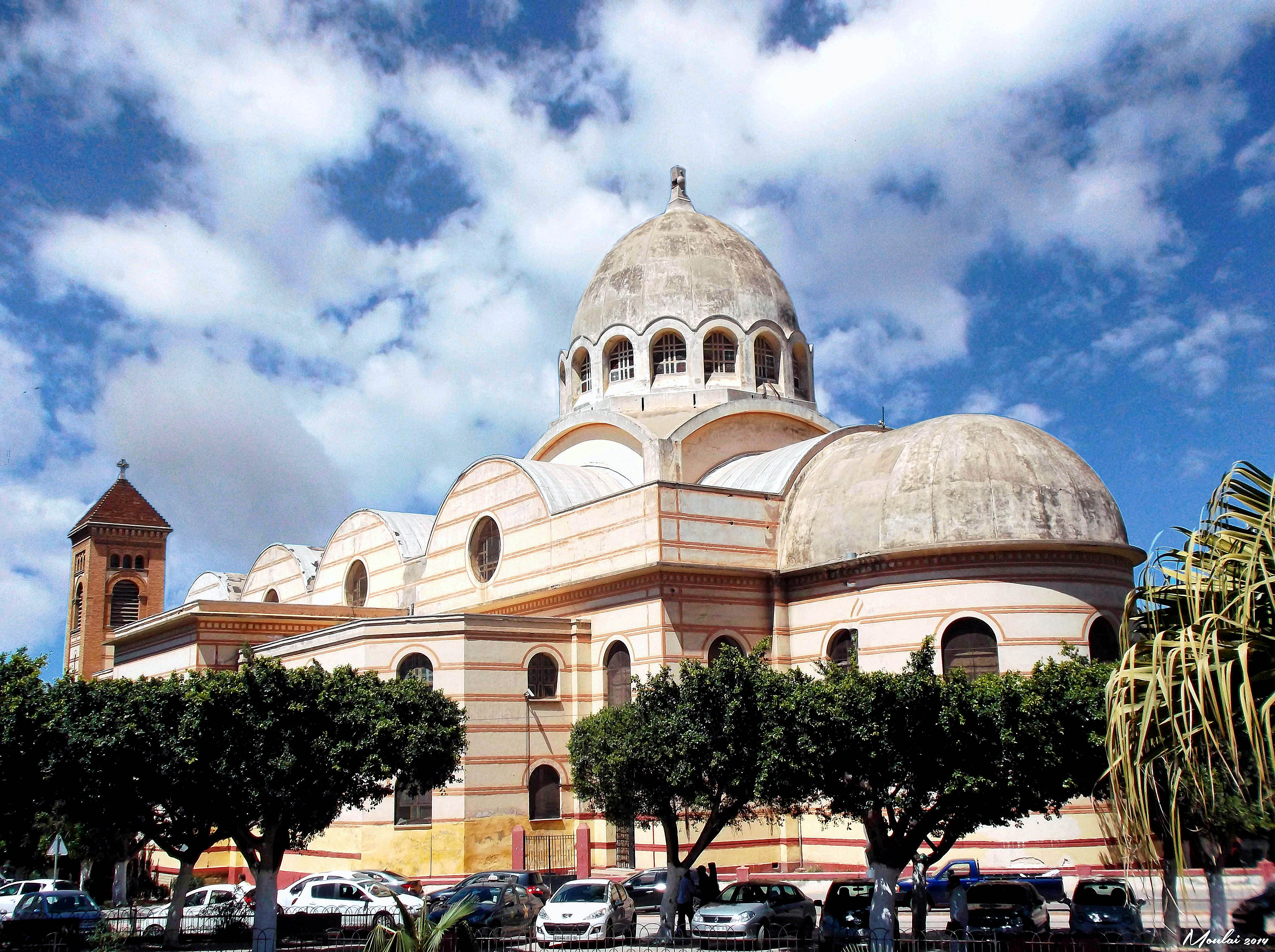
Apse

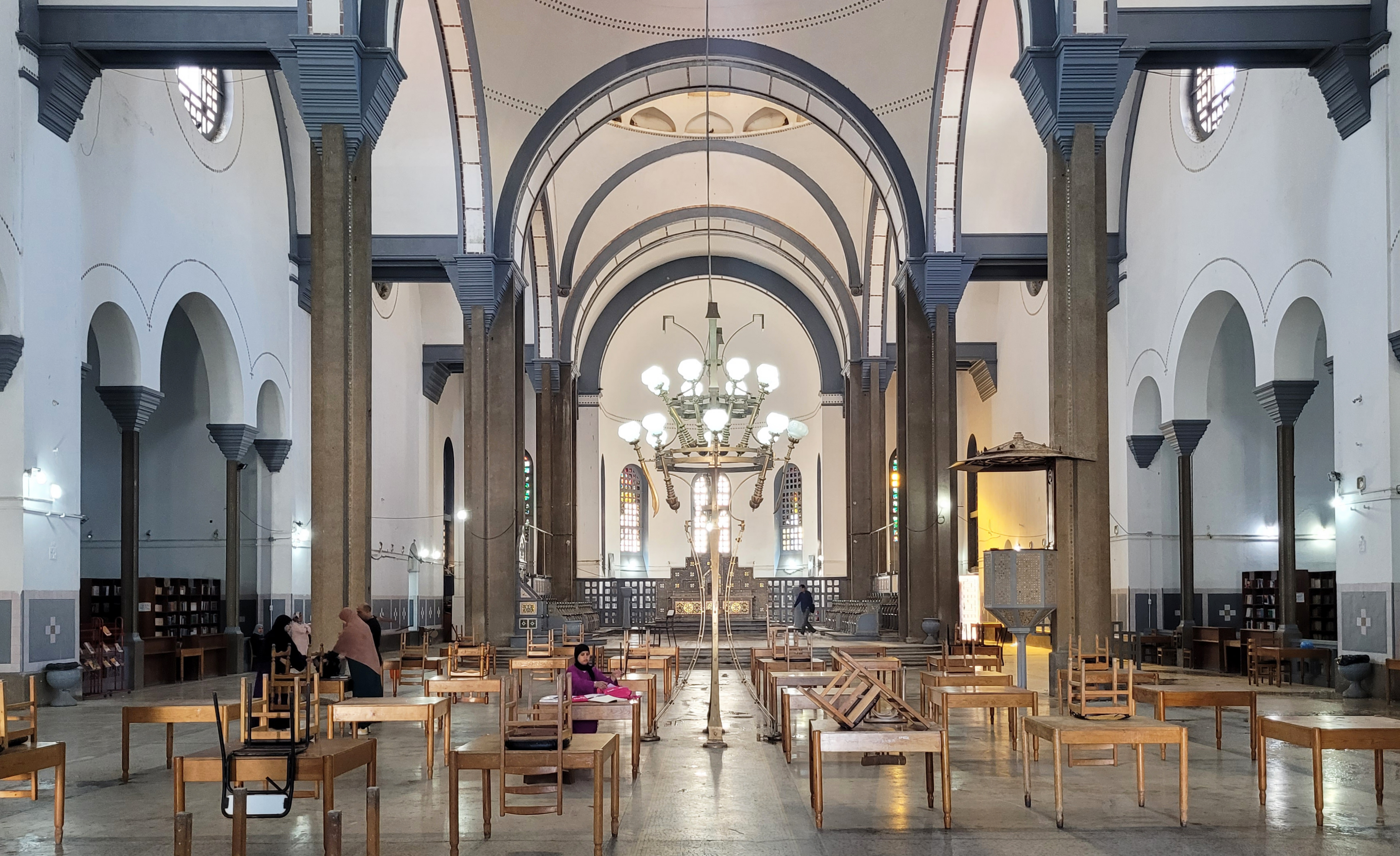
Interior of the Library

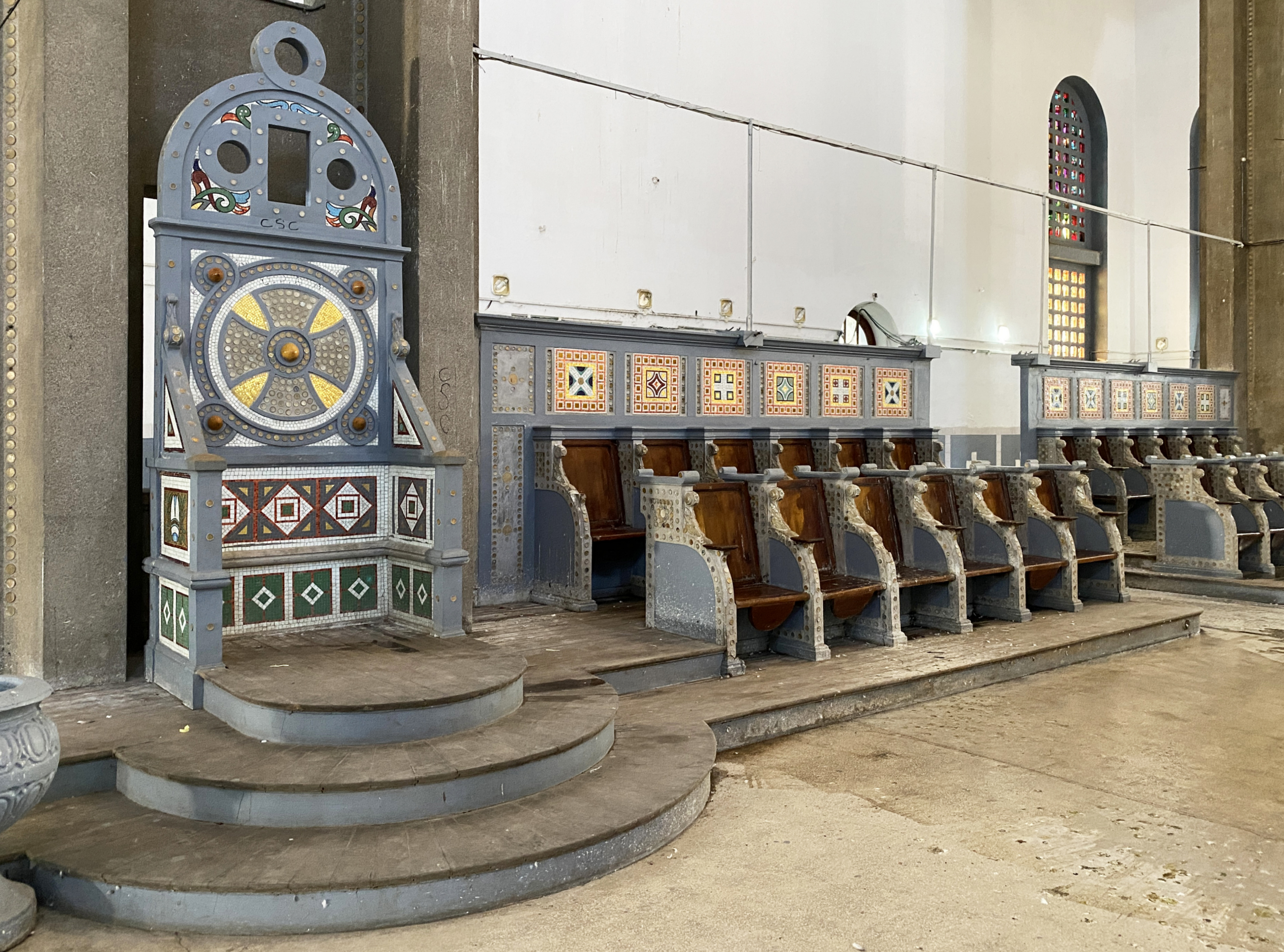
Cathedra and stalls

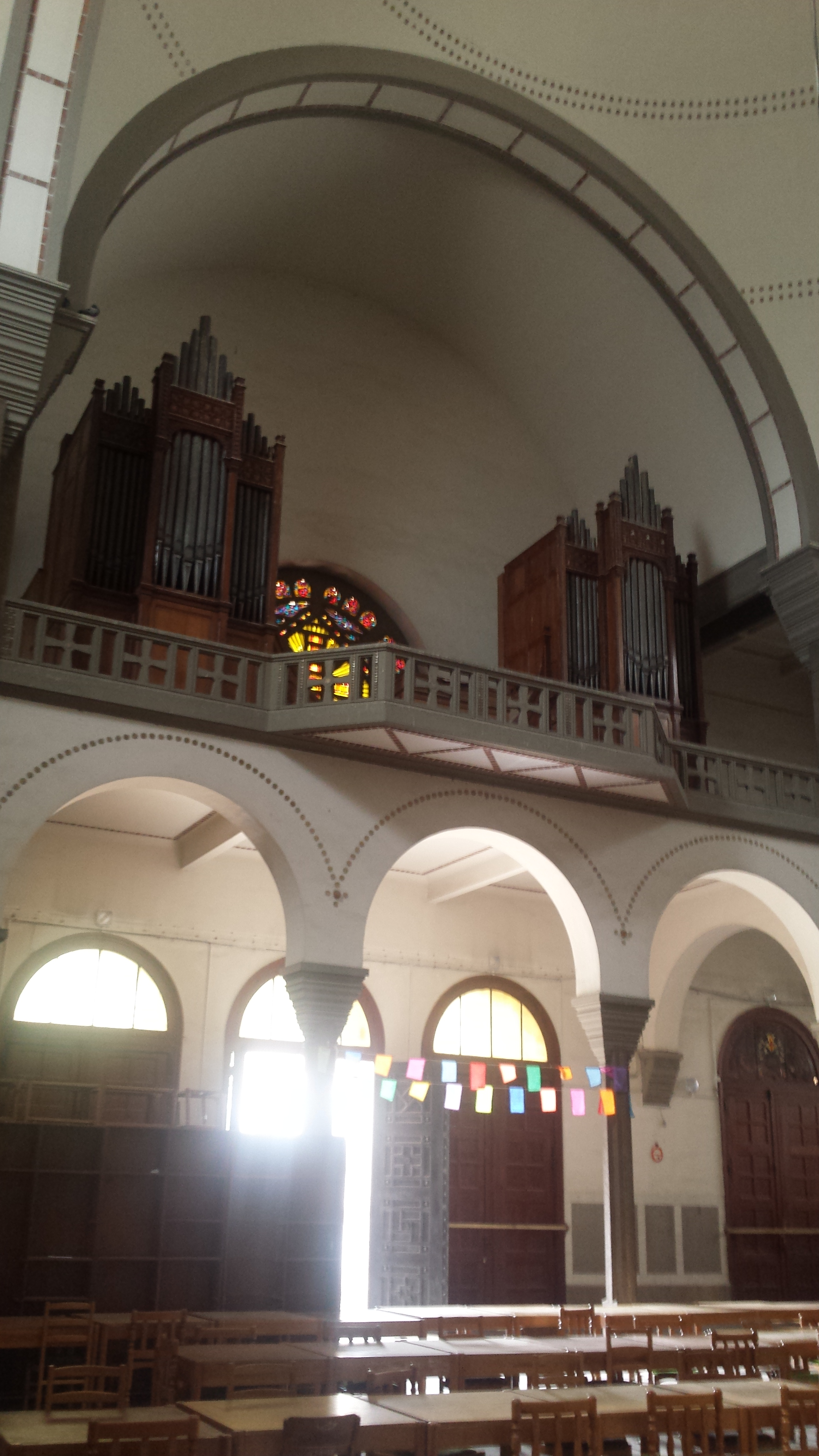
The organ

== See also ==
- Cathédrale du Sacré-Cœur d'Alger
