= Jean Dubuisson =

French architect

- Born: Jean René Julien Dubuisson; 18 September 1914; Lille, France
- Died: 22 October 2011 (aged 97); Nîmes, France
- Occupation: Architect
- Buildings: Musée National des Arts et Traditions Populaires

Jean Dubuisson (18 September 1914 – 22 October 2011) was a French architect who is regarded as one of the leading practitioners of the French post-World War II years.

== Biography ==
Jean René Julien Dubuisson was born in Lille, France. He was the son of the architect Émile Dubuisson (1873–1947).

He began his architecture studies in the École des Beaux Arts in Lille, before continuing at the École des Beaux Arts in Paris. He received his diploma in 1939, in the studio of Emmanuel Pontremoli. He was Second Grand Prix de Rome in 1943 and First Grand Prix de Rome in 1945, following which he lived in Rome, in the Villa Medici, and in Athens from 1946 to 1949. Upon returning to France, he joined in the rebuilding of France after the massive destruction during World War II.

His submission in the Strasbourg competition of 1951, won by Eugène Beaudouin, secured him a place as one of the limited number of architects commissioned by the national government to build housing projects.

Beyond a classical culture gained at the École des Beaux Arts and on his travels in Italy and Greece, Dubuisson was strongly influenced by Mies van der Rohe, Arne Jacobsen, and Walter Gropius. His numerous projects are characterized by the search for a personal language to resolve the drastic constraints of the immense programs of the time. He alone designed approximately 20,000 units of social housing.

Dubuisson is remembered as one of the major figures of the post-World War II period in France, especially as related to housing: the Shape Village in Saint-Germain-en-Laye (1951–1952), La Caravelle in Villeneuve-la-Garenne (1959–1967) and the apartment blocks of Maine-Montparnasse in Paris (1959–1964). He is also known for the National Museum of Folk Arts and Traditions in Paris He won the Grand Prix National de l'Architecture in 1996.

His son is designer Sylvain Dubuisson (born in 1946).

== Selected buildings ==
- 1948: Botanical Garden in Lille
- 1951: SHAPE Village in Saint-Germain-en-Laye (Yvelines) (263 units)
- 1952-1956: "Résidence du parc" housing project in rue Lacépède in Croix (Nord)
- 1953: Housing project in the railway station neighborhood and rue de la Marne in Saint-Lô
- 1954-1962: "Les Hauts-Champs" and "Terrains Cavrois" housing projects in Roubaix
- 1955-1964: Housing project in les Basses-Terres in Pierrefitte-Stains (Seine-Saint-Denis)
- 1957-1973: Crédit Lyonnais Tower, in la Défense, Puteaux (demolished)
- 1958-1966: Mouchotte building in rue du Commandant-René-Mouchotte in Paris
- 1959-1967: Housing project in La Caravelle in Villeneuve-la-Garenne
- 1961-1964: Cormontaigne residence in Thionville
- 1961-1967: Parc Saint-Maur residence in rue Réaumur in Lille (726 units)
- 1962 : Building at 63 avenue de la Bourdonnais in Paris with Michel Jausserand et Olivier Vaudou
- 1962-1980: "Les Hauts de Chambéry" urban development
- 1964-1973: Borny urban development in Metz
- 1964: Saint-Louis Church in Belfort
- 1964-1967: "Les Érables" housing in la Duchère, Lyon
- 1965-1977: CFS headquarters in Rocquencourt, Yvelines
- 1966-1970: André-Weill residential building in Pontpoint, Oise
- 1967: High school (currently Madame de Staël High School) in Montluçon
- 1969: National Museum of Folk Arts and Traditions in the Bois de Boulogne, Paris
- 1969: Exhibition pavilion at the Parc des Expositions de Lac, Bordeaux in collaboration with Francisque Perrier
- 1969: Athéna Port Residence, 1390 boulevard des Graviers, Bandol, Var
- 1969-1971: Advisory architect for the building of the Saint-Laurent nuclear plant in Saint-Laurent-Nouan, Loir-et-Cher, in collaboration with Jean de Mailly.
- 1972: Porte-Verte housing project, 13 avenue du Général-Pershing, in Versailles
