= Robert Camelot =

French architect

Robert Édouard Camelot
- Born: 20 May 1903; Reims
- Died: 4 November 1992 (aged 89); Le Chesnay
- Occupation: Architect
- Years active: 1932 - 1977

Robert Édouard Camelot (20 May 1903 – 4 November 1992) was a French architect and urban planner.

== Biography ==
Robert Édouard Camelot was born in the house known as the Tapis-Rouge, at 57 Rue de Vesle, where his parents ran a novelty shop. Based in Paris, he practised from 1932 to 1977.

== Education ==
In accordance with the teaching methods that had become established at the École des Beaux-Arts during the 19th century, the study of architecture took place within a studio under the authority of a master who prepared his students for architectural entrance examinations.

Robert Camelot was admitted to the École des Beaux-Arts on 14 February 1921, and he entered the first year of architecture on 2 November 1923 in Emmanuel Pontremoli’s studio. The finesse, simplicity and expressive clarity that characterised this studio had a lasting influence on Robert Camelot’s career.
