= Blasphemy law in Algeria =

The People's Democratic Republic of Algeria prohibits blasphemy against Islam by using legislation rather than by using Sharia. The penalty for blasphemy may be years of imprisonment as well as a fine. Every Algerian child has an opportunity to learn what blasphemy is because Islam is a compulsory subject in public schools, which are regulated jointly by the Ministry of Education and the Ministry of Religious Affairs.

== Constitution and laws ==
More than ninety-nine percent of Algeria's population is Sunni Muslim. The Constitution of Algeria declares that Islam is the state religion but Article 36 of the Constitution provides for freedom of belief. The Constitution does not provide for Sharia courts in Algeria's court system. Article 35 guarantees freedom of conscience and of opinion. Article 41 says all citizens are entitled to the freedom of expression. Algeria has signed and ratified the International Covenant on Civil and Political Rights (ICCPR).

Despite the provisions of the Constitution, Algeria severely restricts what anyone can say or what anyone can do as a religious practice. The penal code forbids anyone from insulting, or inciting hatred against, anyone who belongs to an ethnic or philosophical group or to a religion. Freedom of speech must be exercised with respect for "individual dignity, the imperatives of foreign policy, and the national defense."

Algeria uses a 1990 law to protect Islam from defamation, to control access to information from outside the country, and to outlaw writing that threatens national unity. In 2001, the government amended some laws to criminalize writing, cartoons, and speech that insult or offend the president, the parliament, the judiciary, the armed forces, or "any other authority of public order." Those convicted of giving offense face prison sentences that range from three to twenty-four months and fines of 50,000 to 500,000 dinars.

The Ministry of Religious Affairs (MRA) operates to ban publications and broadcasting that might be blasphemous. At the October 2008 Algiers Book Fair, the MRA banned the sale of 1,471 religious titles. Shortly before the book fair, the government banned the printing of author and vocal government critic Mohamed Benchicou's latest book, The Diary of a Free Man. During the 2007 book fair, government officials confiscated and banned a previous book by Benchicou, The Jailhouses of Algiers. Algeria banned the Arab news network Al Jazeera in 2004.

Article 144(2) of the Algerian Penal Code states that "whoever offends the prophet (peace be upon him) and God's other prophets and messengers or the precepts of Islam (whether by writing, drawing, declaration or any other way), is sentenced to 3-5 years imprisonment and fined 50,000 DZD to 100,000 DZD, or one of these two penalties. Criminal proceedings are initiated by the public authorities."

Article 160(1) of the Penal Code states that “any damage or desecration of the Holy Book is punishable by 5 to 10 years in prison."

The government monitors e-mail and the Internet for material that is offensive to the authorities. Internet service providers can face criminal penalties for the material and the websites they host. Providers are not permitted to give access to material "incompatible with morality or public opinion."

== Recent history ==
In 1991, a war began between the Algerian government and several Islamist groups. Fighters on both sides conducted campaigns of torture and murder that were sometimes indiscriminate and sometimes aimed at the intellectual and educated community. The victims included many teachers, students, journalists, writers, artists, musicians, the defenders of human rights, lawyers, civil servants, and foreigners. Hostilities abated after 2006 but a state of emergency remains in effect.

== Selected cases ==
In February 2008, authorities arrested Christian converts Yousef Ourahmane, Rachid Seghir (or Esseghir), and Hamid Ramdani for blasphemy and for uttering threats against a man who allegedly converted from Islam to Christianity to Islam. At the trial, which began on 21 October 2008, the prosecutor asked the court for three years imprisonment and a fine of 50,000 dinars for each man. The court acquitted the men on 29 October because the prosecution did not prove that the men had committed a crime.

In 2008, authorities arrested six residents of the town of Biskra for eating and playing cards during the daylight hours of Ramadan. On 5 October 2008, a judge found all six guilty and fined them 120,000 dinars each ($1,770 US). Six days later an appeals court judge overruled the decision on the ground that the original sentence violated the Constitution. In a separate incident, the Algiers appeals court on 18 November reduced the sentence of three years' imprisonment to two months of time served for three men convicted of smoking during Ramadan. Authorities arrested the men on 21 September and detained them for the duration of their trial.

In 2007, a court dropped charges of blasphemy against Lotfi Chriet and Houria Khatir and six journalists. Chriet and Khatir were the managers of two television channels. The alleged blasphemy was the broadcast of cartoons which were published originally in 2005 in the Danish magazine Jyllands-Posten. The court ruled that the broadcast's purpose was not to ridicule Prophet Muhammad.

In September 2007, a court in the city of Biskra sentenced 26-year-old Samia Smets to ten years imprisonment for violating the Quran. On 28 October 2008, a judge of the Criminal Division of the court in Biskra acquitted Smets. The judge found that Smets, while in jail because of a civil matter, had accidentally dropped a copy of the Quran into water during an argument with other prisoners. Those prisoners had accused Smets of tearing up a Quran but the prosecution did not produce a torn Quran.

== See also ==
- Apostasy in Islam
- Education in Algeria
- Freedom of religion in Algeria
- Islam and blasphemy
- Islam in Algeria
- Religion in Algeria
- Religious freedom in Algeria
