= Protestantism in Algeria =

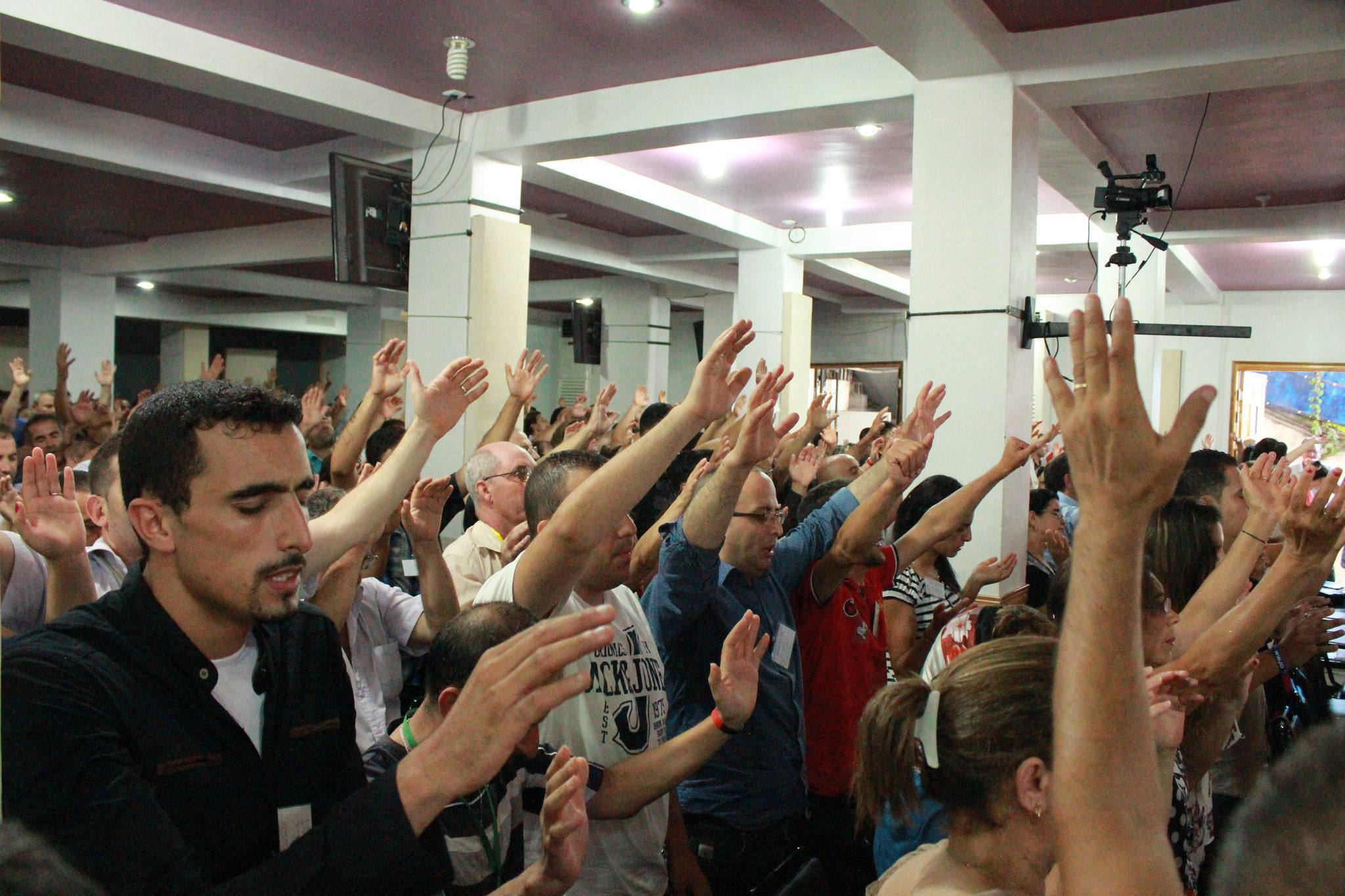
Kabyle Protestants from Algeria.

Protestants are a religious minority in Algeria. Figures in 2020 suggest that Protestants make up 0.03% of the country's population (or one in 10 Christians).

The Protestant Church of Algeria, a Reformed Church, likely has tens of thousands of followers. The Protestant Church of Algeria is one of only two officially recognized Christian organizations in the country. The Minister of Religious Affairs has called the evangelical Church "dangerous".

Missionary groups are permitted to conduct humanitarian activities without government interference as long as they are discreet and do not proselytize openly. Algerian Christians are concentrated in Kabylie. Since, 2006 proselytizing to Muslims can be punished with up to five years of prison.

Since November 2017, 17 churches, members of the Protestant Church of Algeria, have been closed by the Algerian authorities, who justify these closures by a lack of authorisation from the National Commission for the exercise of non-Muslim worship. According to the Protestant Church of Algeria, this Commission has always refused to grant any authorisation to evangelical Protestant communities. The Church of the Full Gospel in Tizi Ouzou, which is described as the largest Algerian Protestant church was closed by police in 2019; in March 2023, a court sentenced the president of the Protestant Church of Algeria (EPA), Pastor Salaheddine Chalah, to 18 months in prison for proselytizing on social media, although this was later reduced to non-custodial sentence.

Algeria is included in the episcopal area of North Africa of the Anglican Diocese of Egypt, though there is only one current congregation in the country, Holy Trinity Anglican Church, in Algiers. The church mainly serves sub-Saharan African students from such areas as Zimbabwe, Zambia, Namibia, South Africa, Nigeria, Kenya, Equatorial Guinea, Ghana, Uganda and Burundi.

== List of denominations ==
Denominations in Algeria include

- Anglican Diocese of Egypt
- Armée du Salut
- Assemblées de Dieu
- Eglise Adventiste du Séptieme Jour
- Eglise Evangélique Copte
- Eglise Protestante d'Algérie
- Frères Larges
- Mission Baptiste Evangélique
- Mission Biblique de Ghardaia
- Mission d'Afrique du Nord
- Mission Evangélique au Sahara
- Mission Evangélique de Médéa
- Mission Evangélique du Sahara
- Mission Rolland

== See also ==
- Status of religious freedom in Algeria
- Christianity in Algeria
