= Saïd Djabelkhir =

Algerian journalist (born 1964)

- Born: December 17, 1964; Boufarik, Algeria
- Occupation: Journalist

Saïd Djabelkhir, born on December 17, 1964, at Boufarik, is an Algerian journalist and an Islamic scholar specializing in Sufism. In 2021, he was sentenced to prison on the charge of "offending Islam".

== Biography ==
Saïd Djabelkhir learned Islamic studies and philosophy at the University of Algiers and then taught Arabic language and philosophy for ten years.

After that, he worked as a journalist at El Khabar and Parcours maghrébin. He then took charge of the cultural section in Arabic-speaking dailies: El-Fadjr, Djazair News and Echourouk. Saïd Djabelkhir was then a journalist for the Emirati daily: El-Khalidj. He contributed to articles on Sufism in the Algerian press, for example in El Watan.

In 2014, he founded the “Circle of Lights for Free Thought” (Moultaqa al Anouar), which invites thinkers to give lectures on religion, history, culture and Algerian society. He is particularly concerned about the issue of the diversity of society: "la démocratisation, la condition des femmes, l’école, la nécessité de préserver le religieux des manipulations" ("democratization, the condition of women, school, the need to protect religion from manipulation").

He campaigns for an update of the interpretation of the Quran: "Ce sont des textes qui ont été édictés dans un contexte historique bien défini. Ces textes répondent à des besoins anciens" ("These are texts that were enacted in a well-defined historical context. These texts respond to ancient needs.")

== Threats because of his views ==
On his Facebook page, he shares his analyses and critiques of various aspects of Islam and Algerian society. Calling himself a supporter of an "Enlightenment Islam", he attacks the dogmatic reading of religious texts by the Salafis and the Wahhabis. He holds that it is necessary, when reading the Qu'ran, to distinguish between history and myths, and that much of the Quranic stories must be taken from a symbolic point of view. He speaks out for a separation of politics and religion in Algeria, whose official religion is Islam.

In May 2019, he declared that fasting in Ramadan was not an Islamic obligation, which earned him death threats from Islamists. He has supported the right to celebrate Yennayer, the Berber New Year. Saïd has said that the ritual sacrifice of the sheep and the pilgrimage to Mecca existed before Islam and therefore have a pagan origin.

== Sentenced to jail ==
In April 2021 he was sentenced to three years in prison and a fine for "offending islam" by the Sidi M'Hamed court. The trial took place after a computer teacher filed a complaint because he felt offended by the remarks of the Islamologist. He appealed this decision. But the new trial, scheduled for July, was postponed in September, due to the absence of the complainant.

After the trial, he said to the AFP French agency: "The fight for freedom of conscience is non-negotiable. It is a fight which must continue."

He received support from Amnesty International who described this sentence as "outrageous", from the Algerian League for the Defense of Human Rights, and the Humanist international association. Razika Adnani, a writer, islamologist and philosopher wrote an article titled "Is Algeria struck by the curse?". The verdict generated reactions also in France, as Ghaleb Bencheikh, the President of the Foundation for the Islam of France, said he was scandalized.

In February 2023, he was acquitted by the Court of Appeal of Algiers.

== Works ==
(ar) Sufim and creation (El Mahroussa, Cairo 2007)

(ar) Sufism, religion and religious referent (Fairouz, 2010)

(ar) The Sufi Confraternities in Algeria, (Fairouz, Algeria 2011)
