= Freedom of religion in Asia by country =

The status of religious freedom in Asia varies from country to country. States can differ based on whether or not they guarantee equal treatment under law for followers of different religions, whether they establish a state religion (and the legal implications that this has for both practitioners and non-practitioners), the extent to which religious organizations operating within the country are policed, and the extent to which religious law is used as a basis for the country's legal code.

There are further discrepancies between some countries' self-proclaimed stances of religious freedom in law and the actual practice of authority bodies within those countries: a country's establishment of religious equality in their constitution or laws does not necessarily translate into freedom of practice for residents of the country. Additionally, similar practices (such as having citizens identify their religious preference to the government or on identification cards) can have different consequences depending on other sociopolitical circumstances specific to the countries in question. Most countries in Asia officially establish the freedom of religion by law, but the extent to which this is enforced varies. Some countries have anti-discrimination laws, and others have anti-blasphemy laws. Legal religious discrimination is present in many countries in Asia. Some countries also have significantly restricted the activities of Islamic groups that they have identified as fundamentalist. Several countries ban proselytization, either in general or for specific religious groups. Tajikistan has significant restrictions against the practice of religion in general, and other countries like China discourage it on a wide basis. Several countries in Asia establish a state religion, with Islam (usually Sunni Islam) being the most common, followed by Buddhism. Lebanon and Iran, as well as the Democratic Federation of Northern Syria have established confessionalist political systems which guarantee set levels of representation in government to specific religious groups in the country. Some majority Muslim countries have Islamic religious courts, with varying degrees of jurisdiction. The governments of some Muslim countries have played an active role in overseeing and directing forms of Muslim religious practice within their country.

Societal levels of religious tolerance vary greatly across Asia. Groups negatively affected include Muslims, Christians, Buddhists and Hindus.

Religious violence is present in several countries, with varying degrees of support or intervention from local governments. Groups including Muslims, Christians, Buddhists and Hindus face religiously motivated violence.

== Afghanistan ==
Afghanistan is an Islamic republic where Islam is practiced by 99.7% of its population. Roughly 90% of the Afghans follow Sunni Islam, with the rest practicing Shia Islam. Apart from Muslims, there are also small minorities of Sikhs and Hindus.

The Constitution of Afghanistan established on January 23, 2004, mandates that:

1. Afghanistan shall be an Islamic Republic, independent, unitary, and an indivisible state.
2. The sacred religion of Islam shall be the religion of the Islamic Republic of Afghanistan. Followers of other faiths shall be free within the bounds of law in the exercise and performance of their religious rights.
3. No law shall contravene the tenets and provisions of the holy religion of Islam in Afghanistan.

In practice, the constitution limits the political rights of Afghanistan's non-Muslims, and only Muslims are allowed to become the President.

In March 2015, a 27-year-old Afghan woman was murdered by a mob in Kabul over false allegations of burning a copy of the Koran. After beating and kicking Farkhunda, the mob threw her over a bridge, set her body on fire and threw it in the river.

=== Taliban controlled regions ===
Historically, the Taliban, which controlled Afghanistan from 1996 to 2001, prohibited free speech about religious issues or discussions that challenge orthodox Sunni Muslim views. Repression by the Taliban of the Hazara ethnic group, which is predominantly Shia Muslim, was particularly severe. Although the conflict between the Hazaras and the Taliban was political and military as well as religious, and it is not possible to state with certainty that the Taliban engaged in its campaign against the Shi'a solely because of their religious beliefs, the religious affiliation of the Hazaras apparently was a significant factor leading to their repression. After the United States invasion of Afghanistan in 2001, the Taliban was forced out of power and began an insurgency against the new government and allied US forces. The Taliban continues to prohibit music, movies, and television on religious grounds in areas that it still holds.

According to the U.S. Military, the Taliban controls 10% of Afghanistan as of December 2017. There are also pockets of territory controlled by Islamic State affiliates. On October 14, 2017, The Guardian reported that there were then between 600 and 800 ISIL-KP militants left in Afghanistan, who are mostly concentrated in Nangarhar Province.

== Armenia ==
As of 2011, most Armenians are Christians (94.8%) and members of Armenia's own church, the Armenian Apostolic Church.

The Constitution of Armenia as amended in December 2005 provides for freedom of religion; however, the law places some restrictions on the religious freedom of adherents of minority religious groups, and there were some restrictions in practice. The Armenian Apostolic Church which has formal legal status as the national church, enjoys some privileges not available to other religious groups. Some denominations reported occasional discrimination by mid- or low-level government officials but found high-level officials to be tolerant. Societal attitudes toward some minority religious groups were ambivalent, and there were reports of societal discrimination directed against members of these groups.

The law does not mandate registration of nongovernmental organizations (NGOs), including religious groups; however, only registered organizations have legal status. Only registered groups may publish newspapers or magazines, rent meeting places, broadcast programs on television or radio, or officially sponsor the visas of visitors, although there is no prohibition on individual members doing so. There were no reports of the Government refusing registration to religious groups that qualified for registration under the law. To qualify for registration, religious organizations must "be free from materialism and of a purely spiritual nature," and must subscribe to a doctrine based on "historically recognized holy scriptures." The Office of the State Registrar registers religious entities. The Department of Religious Affairs and National Minorities oversees religious affairs and performs a consultative role in the registration process. A religious organization must have at least 200 adult members to register.

The Law on Freedom of Conscience prohibits "proselytizing" but does not define it. A criminal code passed in July 2022 prohibits any obstruction of the right to exercise freedom of religion.

== Azerbaijan ==
The Constitution of Azerbaijan provides that persons of all faiths may choose and practice their religion without restriction, although, some sources state that there have been some abuses and restrictions. Azerbaijan is a majority Muslim country. Various estimates calculate that upwards of 95% of the population identify as Muslim. Most are adherents of Shia branch with a minority (15%) being Sunni Muslim, although differences traditionally have not been defined sharply. For many Azerbaijanis, Islam tends toward a more ethnic/nationalistic identity than a purely religious one.

Religious groups are required by law to register with the State Committee on Religious Associations of the Republic of Azerbaijan. Organizations which fail to register may be considered illegal and may be forbidden to operate within Azerbaijan. Some religious groups reported delays in and denials of their registration attempts. There are limitations upon the ability of groups to import religious literature, although these have improved over time. Most religious groups met without government interference; however, local authorities monitored religious services, and officials at times harassed and detained members of "nontraditional" religious groups. There were some reports of societal abuses or discrimination based on religious belief or practice. In the past the US. State Department has reported prejudice against Muslims who convert to other faiths, hostility toward groups that proselytize, particularly evangelical Christian and other missionary groups, as well as Iranian groups and Salafists, who are seen as a threat to security.

== Bahrain ==
The constitution of Bahrain states that Islam is the official religion and that Shari'a (Islamic law) is a principal source for legislation. Article 22 of the Constitution provides for freedom of conscience, the inviolability of worship, and the freedom to perform religious rites and hold religious parades and meetings, in accordance with the customs observed in the country; however, the government has placed some limitations on the exercise of this right in the past. Shi'a Muslims are discriminated against by the government socially and economically, although the government still supports Shi'a religious institutions financially.

In the past, the government of Bahrain has allowed religion-based, political nongovernmental organizations to register as political "societies", which operate somewhat like parties with the legal authority to conduct political activities. The law prohibits the publication of anti-Islamic publications; other religious groups have reported that they have faced no obstacles buying or selling their own religious texts.

Holding a religious meeting without a permit is illegal; however, there have been no reports of religious groups being denied a permit to gather. The High Council for Islamic Affairs is charged with the review and approval of all clerical appointments within both the Sunni and Shi'a communities and maintains program oversight for all citizens studying religion abroad. Historically there is evidence of discrimination against Shi'a Muslims in recruitment for the country's military and domestic security services.

The government funds all official religious institutions, including Shi'a and Sunni mosques, Shi'a ma`tams (religious community centers), Shi'a and Sunni waqfs (religious endowments), and the religious courts, which represent both the Ja'afari (Shi'a) and Maliki (Sunni) schools of Islamic jurisprudence. The Government has permitted public religious events, most notably the large annual commemorative marches by Shi'a Muslims during the Islamic months of Ramadan and Muharram.

Islamic studies are a part of the curriculum in government schools and mandatory for all public school students. The decades-old curriculum is based on the Maliki school of Sunni theology. Proposals to include the Ja'afari traditions of Shi'a Islam in the curriculum have been rejected. The civil and criminal legal systems consist of a complex mix of courts based on diverse legal sources, including Sunni and Shi'a Shari'a, tribal law, and other civil codes and regulations.

=== Interventions against the Shi'a community ===
During the 2011–2012 Arab Spring uprising and crackdown against Shia protest in Bahrain, "dozens" of Shia mosques [were] leveled by the government according to a report in McClatchy newspapers. According to Shiite leaders interviewed by the reporter, work crews have often arrived "in the dead of night, accompanied by police and military escorts", to demolish the mosques, and in many cases, have hauled away the buildings' rubble before townspeople awake so as to leave no trace. Sheikh Khalid bin Ali bin Abdulla al Khalifa, the minister of justice and Islamic affairs for Bahrain, defended the demolitions stating: "These are not mosques. These are illegal buildings." However the McClatchy reporter found that photos taken of several mosques before their destruction by the government "showed they were well maintained, decades-old structures."

In 2016, Sheikh Isa Qassim, a leading Shi'a figure, was placed under house arrest. Protests around his home in June 2016 resulted in 5 deaths, 286 arrests, and 31 injured police officers.

In 2017, militant groups attacked police forces with improvised explosive devices, killing four. The militant groups justified their attacks with Shi'a rhetoric, and in response the government prosecuted members of the Shi'a community, as well as blaming Iran for providing material aid to the militant groups.

=== Status of Jewish community ===
Jewish people in Bahrain regularly practice their faith privately without interference from the government or fear of harassment. While some anti-Zionist political commentary and editorial cartoons appeared, usually linked to the Israeli–Palestinian conflict, outside of a political context the Jewish minority is fully respected and allowed to operate freely. In 2008 Bahrain named Houda Ezra Ebrahim Nonoo, a Jewish female lawmaker, ambassador to the United States.

== Bangladesh ==
Bangladesh was founded as a secular state, but Islam was made the state religion in the 1980s. However, in 2010, the High Court held up the secular principles of the 1972 constitution. The Constitution of Bangladesh establishes Islam as the state religion but also allows other religions to be practiced in harmony.

While the government of Bangladesh does not interfere in the free practice of religion by people within its borders, incidences of individual violence against minority groups are common. In particular, Chakma Buddhists, Hindus, Christians, and Ahmadiyya Muslims are subject to persecution. Additionally, atheists face persecution, with prominent bloggers having been assassinated by radical groups, such as the Ansarullah Bangla Team.

Family law concerning marriage, divorce, and adoption has separate provisions for Muslims, Hindus, and Christians. These laws are enforced in the same secular courts. A separate civil family law applies to mixed faith families or those of other faiths or no faith.

In 2013 the government operated training academies for imams, and monitored the content of religious education in Islamic religious schools, or madrassahs.

In 2022, religious studies are compulsory for public school pupils in grades 3–10. Muslim, Hindu, Buddhist, and Christian pupils will receive instruction in their own religious beliefs.

In 2013, Supreme Court deregistered the Jamaat-e-Islami, the largest Islamist political party, for violating the constitution, thereby banning it from participating in elections. However, the ban was not enforced in practice.

=== Persecution of religious minorities ===
==== Hindus ====
Hindus in Bangladesh have faced violence throughout the country's history, having been subjected to what most academics consider to be a genocide during the Bangladesh Liberation War in 1971. There have been more recent instances of violence in the 2010s.

In 2016 violence over blasphemy accusations lead to the destruction of 15 Hindu temples and 100 homes, although authorities suggest only 8 temples and 22 houses were damaged. According to a report by the Bangladesh Jatiya Hindu Mohajote, in 2017 alone, at least 107 people of the Hindu community were killed and 31 fell victims to enforced disappearances, while 782 Hindus were either forced to leave the country or faced threats demanding that they leave. A further 23 were forced to convert. At least 25 Hindu women and children were raped, while 235 temples and statues vandalized during the year. According to the BJHM, the total number of distinct "atrocities" that affected the Hindu community in 2017 is 6474. During the 2019 Bangladesh elections, eight houses belonging to Hindu families were set on fire in Thakurgaon District alone.

==== Chakma people ====
In June 2017, hundreds of Bengali Muslim villagers in the southeastern part of the country set fire to 300 houses belonging to members of the Chakma people, a mostly Buddhist minority. A 70-year-old woman died during the attacks. The arson followed the killing of a local Muslim resident.

==== Christians ====
In 2018, Bangladesh was number 41 on the World Watch List for religious persecution of Christians, between the United Arab Emirates and Algeria; in 2022, the country was ranked at number 30. In 2016, four people were murdered for their Christian faith. The growing Christian population is met by growing persecution.

==== Ahmadiyya ====
Ahmadis have been targeted by various protests and acts of violence, and fundamentalist Islamic groups have demanded that Ahmadis be officially declared kafirs (infidels).

==== Atheists ====
Several Bangladeshi atheists have been assassinated, and a "hit list" exists issued by the Bangladeshi Islamic organisation, the Ansarullah Bangla Team. Activist atheist bloggers have left Bangladesh under threat of assassination.

== Bhutan ==
The Bhutanese Constitution of 2008 and previous law provide for freedom of religion in Bhutan; however, the government has limited non-Buddhist missionary activity, barring non-Buddhist missionaries from entering the country, limiting construction of non-Buddhist religious buildings, and restricting the celebration of some non-Buddhist religious festivals. Drukpa Kagyu (Mahayana) Buddhism is the state religion, although in the southern areas many citizens openly practice Hinduism, and there is an increasing acceptance of Hinduism as a religion in Bhutan, including support from the royal family of Bhutan.

There are reports of discrimination against Christians in the country; in 2022, leaders reported that their main difficulty lay in acquiring land for burials, rather than the traditional cremations.

Religious political parties are forbidden by the constitution of Bhutan.

== Brunei ==
The constitution of Brunei states, "The religion of Brunei Darussalam shall be the Muslim religion according to the Shafi'i sect of that religion: Provided that all other religions may be practiced in peace and harmony by the person professing them in any part of Brunei Darussalam." The government enforces the Sharia Penal Code; apostasy and blasphemy are criminal offences, punishable by corporal and capital punishment.

Since the early 1990s, the government has reinforced the legitimacy of the hereditary monarchy and the observance of traditional and Muslim values by asserting a national ideology known as the Melayu Islam Beraja (MIB), or Malay Islamic Monarchy, the genesis of which reportedly dates from the 15th century. MIB principles have been adopted as the basis for government, and all meetings and ceremonies commence with a Muslim prayer. In the past, citizenship ceremonies required non-Muslims to wear national dress, which included Muslim head coverings for men and women. There is no legal requirement for women to wear head coverings in public, and government officials are portrayed regularly, if infrequently, in the media without head coverings. There is social pressure for women to wear head coverings in public.

=== Law enforcement ===
The government routinely censors magazine articles on other faiths, blacking out or removing photographs of crucifixes and other Christian religious symbols. Government officials also guard against the distribution and sale of items that feature photographs of undesirable or religious symbols. There have been reports that government agents monitored religious services at Christian churches and that senior church members believed that they were under intermittent surveillance.

Religious authorities regularly participated in raids to confiscate alcoholic beverages and non-halal meats. They also monitored restaurants and supermarkets to ensure conformity with halal practice. Restaurants and service employees that served a Muslim in daylight hours during the fasting month were subjected to fines. Non-halal restaurants and non-halal sections in supermarkets were allowed to operate without interference from religious authorities.

=== Education ===
MIB is a compulsory subject for students in both public and private schools and universities. Ugama is a seven-year education system that teaches Islam under the Sunni Shafi'i school of thought; Muslim citizenships are required to go through ugama at until the age of 14. Most school textbooks were illustrated to depict Islam as the norm, and often all women and girls were shown wearing the Muslim head covering. There were no depictions of practices of other religions in textbooks. The Ministry of Education prohibits the teaching of other religions and comparative religious studies. In the past, one private school that offered Islam instruction during regular school hours allowed Christian students to attend church during those periods when Muslim students receive instruction about Islam.

=== Marriage and conversions ===
Marriage between Muslims and those of other faiths is not permitted, and non-Muslims must convert to Islam if they wish to marry a Muslim. Muslims are not allowed to convert to another religion and some non-Muslims say that they face pressure to convert to Islam.

== Cambodia ==
Article 43 of the Constitution of the Kingdom of Cambodia reads: "Khmer citizens of either sex shall have the right to freedom of belief. Freedom of religious belief and worship shall be guaranteed by the State on the condition that such freedom does not affect other religious beliefs or violate public order and security. Buddhism shall be the State religion."

== China ==
The Constitution of the People's Republic of China provides for freedom of religious belief; however, the government restricts religious practice to government-sanctioned organizations; the government recognizes five religious groups including the Buddhist Association of China, the Chinese Taoist Association, the Islamic Association of China, the Three-Self Patriotic Movement (a Protestant group) and the Chinese Patriotic Catholic Association.

Members of the governing Communist Party are strongly discouraged from holding religious faith.

A significant number of non-sanctioned churches and temples exist, attended by locals and foreigners alike. Unregistered or underground churches are not officially banned, but are not permitted to openly conduct religious services. These bodies may face varying degrees of interference, harassment, and persecution by state and party organs. In some instances, unregistered religious believers and leaders have been charged with "illegal religious activities" or "disrupting social stability." Religious believers have also been charged under article 300 of the criminal code, which forbids using heretical organizations to "undermine the implementation of the law."

=== Falun Gong ===
Following a period of meteoric growth of Falun Gong in the 1990s, the Communist Party launched a campaign to "eradicate" Falun Gong on 20 July 1999. The suppression is characterised by multifaceted propaganda campaign, a program of enforced ideological conversion and re-education, and a variety of extralegal coercive measures such as arbitrary arrests, forced labor, and physical torture, sometimes resulting in death.

An extra-constitutional body called the 6-10 Office was created to lead the suppression of Falun Gong. The authorities mobilized the state media apparatus, judiciary, police, army, the education system, families and workplaces against the group. The campaign is driven by large-scale propaganda through television, newspaper, radio and internet. There are reports of systematic torture, illegal imprisonment, forced labor, organ harvesting and abusive psychiatric measures, with the apparent aim of forcing practitioners to recant their belief in Falun Gong.

=== Tibetan Buddhism ===
Prior to Tibet's incorporation into China, Tibet was a theocracy with the Dalai Lama functioning as the head of government. Since incorporation into China, Dalai Lama have at times sanctioned Chinese control of the territory, while at other times they have been a focal point of political and spiritual opposition to the Chinese government. As various high-ranking Lamas in the country have died, the Chinese government has proposed their own candidates for these positions, which has led at times to rival claimants to the same position. In an effort to further control Tibetan Buddhism and thus Tibet, the Chinese government passed a law in 2007 requiring a Reincarnation Application be completed and approved for all lamas wishing to reincarnate.

=== Treatment of Muslims ===
Ethnicity plays a large role in the Chinese government's attitude toward Muslim worship. Authorities in Xinjiang impose strict restrictions on Uyghur Muslims: mosques are monitored by the government, Ramadan observance is restricted, and the government has run campaigns to discourage men from growing beards which are associated with fundamentalist Islam. Uyghur Muslims face discrimination and detention for practicing their religion. However, this persecution is largely due to the association of Islam with Uyghur separatism. Hui Muslims living in China do not face the same degree of persecution, and the government has at times been particularly lenient toward Hui practitioners. Although religious education for children is officially forbidden by law in China, the Communist party allows Hui Muslims to violate this law and have their children educated in religion and attend Mosques while the law is enforced on Uyghurs. After secondary education is completed, China then allows Hui students who are willing to embark on religious studies under an Imam. China does not enforce the law against children attending Mosques on non-Uyghurs in areas outside of Xinjiang.

=== Support for traditional religions ===
Toward the end of the 20th century, China's government began to more openly encourage the practice of various traditional cults, particularly the state cults devoted to the Yellow Emperor and the Red Emperor. In the early 2000s, the Chinese government became open especially to traditional religions such as Mahayana Buddhism, Taoism and folk religion, emphasising the role of religion in building a "Harmonious Society" (hexie shehui), a Confucian idea. Aligning with Chinese anthropologists' emphasis on "religious culture", the government considers these religions as integral expressions of national "Chinese culture" and part of China's intangible cultural heritage.

== Cyprus ==
The Republic of Cyprus largely upholds and respects religious freedom within its territory. However, individual cases of religious discrimination against Muslims have occurred. In 2016, a 19th-century mosque was attacked by arsonists, an action condemned by the government.

In 2018, the Cyprus Humanist Association accused the Ministry of Education of promoting anti-atheist educational content on its government website.

=== Northern Cyprus ===
While freedom of religion is constitutionally protected in Turkish occupied Northern Cyprus, the government has at times restricted the practice of Greek Orthodox Churches. A controversial 2016 decision restricts most Orthodox churches to celebrate a single religious service per year.

== India ==
The Indian constitution's preamble states that India is a secular state. Freedom of religion is a fundamental right guaranteed by the constitution. According to Article 25 of the Indian Constitution, every citizen of India has the right to "profess, practice and propagate religion", "subject to public order, morality and health" and also subject to other provisions under that article.

Article 25 (2b) uses the term "Hindus" for all classes and sections of Hindus, Jains, Buddhists and Sikhs. Sikhs and Buddhists objected to this wording that makes many Hindu personal laws applicable to them. However, the same article also guarantees the right of members of the Sikh faith to bear a Kirpan.

Religions require no registration. The government can ban a religious organisation if it disrupts communal harmony, has been involved in terrorism or sedition, or has violated the Foreign Contributions Act. The government limits the entry of any foreign religious institution or missionary and since the 1960s, no new foreign missionaries have been accepted though long term established ones may renew their visas. Many sections of the law prohibit hate speech and provide penalties for writings, illustrations, or speech that insult a particular community or religion.

Some major religious holidays like Diwali (Hindu), Christmas (Christian), Eid (Muslim) and Guru Nanak's birth anniversary (Sikh) are considered national holidays. Private schools offering religious instruction are permitted while government schools are non-religious.

The government has set up the Ministry of Minority Affairs, the National Human Rights Commission (NHRC) and the National Commission for Minorities (NCM) to investigate religious discrimination and to make recommendations for redressal to the local authorities. Though they do not have any power, local and central authorities generally follow them. These organisations have investigated numerous instances of religious tension including the implementation of "anti-conversion" bills in numerous states, the 2002 Gujarat violence against Muslims, the Exodus of Kashmiri Hindus from the state (now a union territory since August 5, 2019) of Jammu and Kashmir in the 1990s and the 2008 attacks against Christians in Orissa.

=== Jammu and Kashmir ===
The Grand Ashura Procession In Kashmir where Shia Muslims mourn the death of Husayn ibn Ali has been banned by the Government of Jammu and Kashmir since the 1990s. People taking part in it are detained, and injured by Jammu and Kashmir Police every year. According to the government, this restriction was placed due to security reasons. Local religious authorities and separatist groups condemned this action and said it is a violation of their fundamental religious rights. The decades-old ban was partially lifted in July 2023 when the Lieutenant Governor's administration permitted the traditional 8th Muharram procession to move from Guru Bazar to Dalgate for the first time in 34 years. The processions have continued to happen peacefully every year after 2023. Following the historic shift, the Jammu and Kashmir administration has permanently integrated these permissions into their annual calendar.

== Indonesia ==
The Indonesian Constitution states "every person shall be free to choose and to practice the religion of his/her choice" and "guarantees all persons the freedom of worship, each according to his/her own religion or belief". It also states that "the nation is based upon belief in one supreme God." The first tenet of the country's national ideology, Pancasila, similarly declares belief in one God. Government employees are required to swear allegiance to the nation and to the Pancasila ideology. While there are no official laws against atheism, a lack of religious belief is contrary to the first tenet of Pancasila, and atheists have been charged and prosecuted for blasphemy.

The government officially only recognises six religions, namely Islam, Protestantism, Catholicism, Hinduism, Buddhism and Confucianism.

== Iran ==
The Iranian constitution was drafted during the Iranian Constitutional Revolution in 1906; While the constitution was modelled on Belgium's 1831 constitution, the provisions guaranteeing freedom of worship were omitted. Subsequent legislation provided some recognition to the religious minorities of Zoroastrians, Jews and Christians, in addition to majority Muslim population, as equal citizens under state law, but it did not guarantee freedom of religion and "gave unprecedented institutional powers to the clerical establishment." The Islamic Republic of Iran, that was established after the Iranian revolution, recognizes four religions, whose status is formally protected: Zoroastrianism, Judaism, Christianity, and Islam. Members of the first three groups receive special treatment under law, and five of the 270 seats in parliament are reserved for members of these religious groups. However, senior government posts including the presidency are reserved exclusively for followers of Shia Islam.

Additionally, adherents of the Baháʼí Faith, Iran's largest religious minority, are not recognized and are targeted for persecution. Baháʼís have been subjected to unwarranted arrests, false imprisonment, executions, confiscation and destruction of property owned by individuals and the Baháʼí community, denial of civil rights and liberties, and denial of access to higher education. Since the Islamic Revolution of 1979, Iranian Baháʼís have regularly had their homes ransacked or been banned from attending university or holding government jobs, and several hundred have received prison sentences for their religious beliefs. Baháʼí cemeteries have been desecrated and property seized and occasionally demolished, including the House of Mírzá Buzurg, Bahá'u'lláh's father. The House of the Báb in Shiraz has been destroyed twice, and is one of three sites to which Baháʼís perform pilgrimage.

== Iraq ==
The government of Iraq is a constitutional democracy with a republican, federal, pluralistic governmental system consisting of 18 provinces or "governorates.". Although the Constitution recognizes Islam as the official religion and states that no law may be enacted that contradicts the established provisions of Islam, it also guarantees freedom of thought, conscience, and religious belief and practice.

While the Government generally endorses these rights, political instability during the Iraq War and the 2014—2017 Iraqi Civil War and the prevented effective governance in parts of the country not controlled by the Government, and the Government's ability to protect religious freedoms has been handicapped by insurgency, terrorism, and sectarian violence. Since 2003, when the government of Saddam Hussein fell, the Iraqi government has generally not engaged in state-sponsored persecution of any religious group, calling instead for tolerance and acceptance of all religious minorities. However, some government institutions have continued their long-standing discriminatory practices against the Baháʼí and Sunni Muslims.

Beginning in 2017, an Iraqi insurgency by the Islamic State of Iraq and the Levant (IS, formerly ISIL or ISIS) led to violations of religious freedom in certain parts of Iraq. IS is a Sunni jihadist group that claims religious authority over all Muslims across the world and aspires to bring most of the Muslim-inhabited regions of the world under its political control beginning with Iraq. The IS follows an extreme anti-Western interpretation of Islam, promotes religious violence and regards those who do not agree with its interpretations as infidels or apostates. Concurrently, IS aims to establish a Salafist-orientated Islamist state in Iraq, Syria and other parts of the Levant.

== Israel ==
Israel's Basic Law of Human Dignity and Liberty promises freedom and full social and political equality, regardless of political affiliation, while also describing the country as a "Jewish and democratic state". However, the Pew Research Center has identified Israel as one of the countries that places high restrictions on religion, and the U.S. State Department notes that while the government generally respects religious freedom in practice, governmental and legal discrimination against non-Jews and non-Orthodox Jews exist, including arrests, detentions, and the preferential funding of Jewish schools and religious organizations over similar organizations serving other religious groups. On July 18, 2018, Israel adopted a law defining itself as "the homeland of the Jewish people in which the Jewish people fulfill their self-determination according to their cultural and historical legacy."

Various observers have objected that archaeological and construction practices funded by the Israeli government are used to bolster Jewish claims to the land while ignoring other sites of archaeological importance, some going as far as to claim that Israel systematically disrespected sites of Christian and Muslim cultural and historical importance.

Several influential political parties within Israel's Knesset have explicitly religious character and politics (Shas, The Jewish Home, United Torah Judaism). Shas and United Torah Judaism represent different ethnic subgroups of the Haredi Jewish community in Israel. These parties seek to strengthen Jewish religious laws in the country and enforce more ultra-orthodox customs on the rest of the population, among other political platforms specific to their voterbase. Historically the state's treatment of Haredi Jewish communities has been an issue of political contention, and different Haredi communities are divided on their attitude toward the Israeli state itself. The Jewish Home represents the religious right-wing Israeli settler communities in the West Bank.

While Israel's legal tradition is based on English Common Law, not Jewish Halakha, Halakha is applied in many civil matters, such as laws relating to marriage and divorce, and legal rulings concerning the Temple Mount. Israeli authorities have codified a number of religious laws in the country's political laws, including an official ban on commerce on Shabbat and a 1998 ban on the importation of nonkosher meat.

=== Law of Return ===
The Israeli Law of Return provides that any Jew, or the child or grandchild of a Jew, may immigrate to Israel with their spouse and children. Israel's process for determining the validity of a prospective immigrant's claim to Judaism has changed over time, and has been subject to various controversies.

=== Management of holy sites ===
Israel's 1967 Protection of Holy Sites Law protects the holy sites of all religious groups in the country. The government also provides for the maintenance and upkeep of holy sites, although The U.S. State Department has noted that Jewish sites receive considerably more funding than Muslim sites, and that the government additionally provides for the construction of new Jewish synagogues and cemeteries.

==== Temple Mount / Haram al-Sharif / Al-Aqsa Mosque compound ====
The government of Israel has repeatedly upheld a policy of not allowing non-Muslims to pray at the Temple Mount/Haram al-Sharif since their annexation of East Jerusalem and the Temple Mount/Haram al-Sharif site in 1967. The government has ruled to allow access to the compound for individuals regardless of faith, but removes non-Muslims if they appear to be praying and sometimes restricts access for non-Muslims and young Muslim men, citing security concerns. Since 2000, the Jerusalem Islamic Waqf that manages the Al-Aqsa Mosque compound has restricted non-Muslims from entering the Dome of the Rock shrine and Jami'a Al-Aqsa, and prohibits wearing or displaying non-Muslim religious symbols.

==== Western Wall ====
The religious practices allowed at the Western Wall are established by the Rabbi of the Western Wall, appointed jointly by the Prime Minister of Israel and chief rabbis. Mixed-gender prayer is forbidden at the Western Wall, in deference to Orthodox Jewish practice. Women are not allowed to wear certain prayer shawls, and are not allowed to read aloud from the Torah at the Wall.

== Japan ==
The constitution provides for freedom of religion; it prohibits religious organizations from exercising political authority.

In 2020, religious affiliation was approximately 48.5% Shinto, 46.3% Buddhist, 1% Christian and 4.3% 'other; religious groups do not have to register with the government, but can access tax benefits if they do so.

Government schools are prohibited from teaching religious education; private schools may do so if they wish.

In July 2022, former prime minister Shinzo Abe was assassinated by a man who stated that he resented the Unification Church; it was announced in October 2022 that the Japanese government would start an investigation into the extent of Abe's relationship with the Unification Church. The Liberal Democratic Party ordered all members to leave the UC, while UC members have reported high level of intolerance as well governmental and societal pressures.

Historically, Japan had a long tradition of mixed religious practice between Shinto and Buddhism since the introduction of Buddhism in the 7th century. Though the Emperor of Japan is supposed to be the direct descendant of Amaterasu Ōmikami, the Shinto sun goddess, all Imperial family members, as well as almost all Japanese, were Buddhists who also practiced Shinto religious rites as well. Christianity flourished when it was first introduced by Francis Xavier, but was soon violently suppressed.

After the Meiji Restoration, Japan tried to reform its state to resemble a European constitutional monarchy. The Emperor, Buddhism, and Shintoism were officially separated and Shintoism was set as the state religion. The Constitution specifically stated that Emperor is "holy and inviolable" (Japanese: 天皇は神聖にして侵すべからず, romanized: tennou wa shinsei nishite okasu bekarazu). During the period of Hirohito, the status of emperor was further elevated to be a living god (Japanese: 現人神, romanized: Arahito gami). This ceased at the end of World War II, when the current constitution was drafted. (See Ningen-sengen.)

In 1946, during the Occupation of Japan, the United States drafted Article 20 of the constitution of Japan (still in use), which mandates a separation of religious organizations from the state, as well as ensuring religious freedom: "No religious organization shall receive any privileges from the State, nor exercise any political authority. No person shall be compelled to take part in any religious act, celebration, rite or practice. The State and its organs shall refrain from religious education or any other religious activity."

The New Komeito Party is a political party associated with the religion Sōka Gakkai, a minor religion in Japan.

== Jordan ==
The Constitution of Jordan provides for the freedom to practice the rights of one's religion and faith in accordance with the customs that are observed in the kingdom, unless they violate public order or morality. The state religion is Islam. The Government prohibits conversion from Islam and proselytizing to Muslims; authorities have the power to prosecute individuals who proselytize Muslims with a potential punishment of up to three years imprisonment or a fine of up to 200 dinars.

Members of unrecognized religious groups and converts from Islam face legal discrimination and bureaucratic difficulties as well as societal intolerance.

== Kazakhstan ==
Kazakhstan's constitution notes that the country as a secular state and provides for freedom of religion and belief.

In 2007, the Hare Krishna movement, a registered group, suffered the demolition of 25 homes as part of the Karasai local government's campaign to seize title to its land based on alleged violations of property laws.

In 2022, religious groups noted a reduction in discrimination and anti-religious propaganda, although some groups continued to face societal scrutiny.

== North Korea ==
The North Korean constitution guarantees freedom of belief; however, a 2014 UN Commission of Inquiry report found that authorities almost completely denied the rights to freedom of religion and determined the government reportedly executed, tortured, arrested, and physically abused individuals for their religious activities.

While many Christians in North Korea fled to the South during the Korean War, and former North Korean president Kim Il Sung criticized religion in his writings, it is unclear the extent to which religious persecution was enacted, as narratives about persecution faced by Christians are complicated by evidence of pro-Communist Christian communities that may have existed since at least the 1960s, and that many Christian defectors from North Korea were also of a high socioeconomic class and thus would have had other reasons to oppose and face persecution from the government. The Federation of Korean Christians and Korea Buddhist Federation are the official representatives of those faith groups in government, but it is unclear to what extent they are actually representative of religious practitioners in the country.

== South Korea ==
The constitution of the Republic of Korea provides for religious freedom and mandates separation of religion and state.

In the Pew Research Center's Government Restrictions Index 2015, the country was categorized as having moderate levels of government restrictions on the freedom of religion, up from previous categorizations of low levels of government restrictions.

Since the 1980s and the 1990s there have been acts of hostility committed by Protestants against Buddhists and followers of traditional religions in South Korea. This include the arson of temples, the beheading of statues of Buddha and bodhisattvas, and red Christian crosses painted on either statues or other Buddhist and other religions' properties. Some of these acts have even been promoted by churches' pastors.

In 2018, a mass protest broke out in support of freedom of religion and against the government's inaction on widespread programs of violent forced conversion carried out by Christian churches under the guide of the Christian Council of Korea (CCK), just after a woman named Ji-In Gu, one among approximately a thousand victims of the churches, was kidnapped and killed while being forced to convert. Before being killed, Ji-In Gu dedicated herself in exposing the conversion treatments, and for such reason she had become a target of the Christian churches. Ji was a member of the controversial Shincheonji Church of Jesus the Temple of the Tabernacle of the Testimony, which is considered by most South Koreans to be a deceptive cult.

In 2022, the government gave over US$10m to seven religious groups to fund religious and cultural events.

== Kuwait ==
The constitution of Kuwait provides for religious freedom, although it also establishes Islam as the state religion; however, the government does not recognize any non-Abrahamic religions.

=== Restrictions and safeguards ===
The law requires fines or jail terms for anyone convicted of defaming any Abrahamic religions. The law also prohibits publications that discuss insulting religion or sorcery, as well as some forms of proselytizing, the import or sell of pork or alcohol, and public consumption of food during Ramadan.

The government appoints and pays the salaries of Sunni imams as well as providing the basic texts for sermons; it does not oversee Shia imams in this way, although it does pay the salaries of some Shia imams and mosque staff.

=== Education ===
Sunni Islamic religion studies is mandatory at all levels for all Muslim students in schools with at least one Muslim student; non-Muslim students are not required to attend these classes.

=== Marriage and family law ===
Religious courts administer personal status law. Shia Muslims follow their own jurisprudence in matters of personal status and family law at the first instance and appellate levels. In 2003 the government approved a Shia request to establish a court of cassation to oversee Shia personal status issues, but as of 2017 the court was not yet been established due to the lack of Shia clergy in the country properly trained to officiate it.

The law states that Muslim apostates lose certain legal rights, including the right to inherit property from Muslim relatives or spouses, but it does not specify any criminal penalty. The marriage of a Muslim man is annulled if he converts from Islam. If a Muslim woman married to a Muslim man leaves Islam, the marriage is automatically annulled, unless she converts to Christianity or Judaism.

The law prohibits the naturalization of non-Muslims but allows male citizens of any religion to transmit citizenship to their descendants. Female citizens, regardless of religion, are unable to transmit nationality to their children. An individual’s religion is included on birth and marriage certificates, but no other national identity documents.

=== Treatment of Shia Muslims ===
The Shia make up an estimated 30 percent of the population, but remain underrepresented in all segments of government and have disproportionately lower numbers of senior officers in the military and police force. Shia community leaders report a 'glass ceiling' in promotions and difficulties in getting jobs, as well as a lack of places to worship. Shia worshippers are allowed to celebrate Ashura privately and the government provides security to Shia neighborhoods.

=== Treatment of followers non-Abrahamic religions ===
Members of non-Abrahamic faiths state that they are free to practice their religion in private, but faced harassment and potential prosecution if they practiced their faith in public. In the past, expatriates of non-Abrahamic religions could not have public places of worship nor marry in Kuwait, and remained subject to sharia if family matters were taken to court. Most members of these communities indicated they were able to practice their faith within their communities, but practiced a discreet form of self-censorship that allowed them to avoid conflict with authorities.

== Kyrgyzstan ==
The Constitution of Kyrgyzstan provides for the freedom of religion in Kyrgyzstan, and the government generally respects this right in practice. The Constitution provides for the separation of religion and state, and it prohibits discrimination based on religion or religious beliefs. The Government does not officially support any religion; however, a May 6, 2006 decree recognized Islam and Russian Orthodoxy as traditional religious groups. Government estimates in 2022 showed that 90% of citizens had an Islamic background and 7% had a Christian background (with almost have of these belonging to the Russian Orthodox Church).

The State Agency for Religious Affairs (SARA), formerly called the State Commission on Religious Affairs (SCRA), is responsible for promoting religious tolerance, protecting freedom of conscience, and overseeing laws on religion. All religious organizations, including schools, must apply for approval of registration from SARA. The Muftiate (or Spiritual Administration of Muslims of Kyrgyzstan-SAMK) is the highest Islamic managing body in the country. The Muftiate oversees all Islamic entities, including institutes and madrassahs, mosques, and Islamic organizations.

The law requires religious groups to register with the government, as well as forbidding proselytizing on behalf of a banned organization, and proselytizing a minor without their parent's consent; it also restricts the registration of groups it considered to be a threat.

== Laos ==
The Constitution of Laos provides for freedom of religion and the government recognises Buddhism, Christianity, Islam and the Baha’i Faith; the Prime Minister's Decree on Religious Practice (Decree 315) is the principal legal document defining rules for religious practice.

In the past, local officials have pressured minority Protestants to renounce their faith on threat of arrest or forceful eviction from their villages. Such cases occurred in Bolikhamsai, Houaphanh Province, and Luang Namtha provinces. Arrests and detentions of Protestants occurred in Luang Namtha, Oudomxay, Salavan, Savannakhet, and Vientiane provinces. In some areas, minority Protestants were forbidden from gathering to worship. In areas where Protestants were actively proselytizing, local officials sometimes subjected them to "reeducation." Two Buddhist monks were also arrested in Bolikhamsai Province for having been ordained without government authorization.

In 2022, Lao Evangelical Church (LEC) Pastor Sy Sengmanee was found beaten to death several days after he was abducted; he had faced harassment before his death.

== Lebanon ==
The Constitution of Lebanon provides for freedom of religion and the freedom to practice all religious rites provided that the public order is not disturbed. The Constitution declares equality of rights and duties for all citizens without discrimination or preference but establishes a balance of power among the major religious groups through a confessionalist system, largely codified by the National Pact. Family matters such as marriage, divorce and inheritance are still handled by the religious authorities representing a person's faith. Calls for civil marriage are unanimously rejected by the religious authorities but civil marriages conducted in another country are recognized by Lebanese civil authorities, although in 2022, it was unclear if virtual online weddings were recognized.

=== National Pact ===
The National Pact is an agreement that specifies that specific government positions must go to members of specific religious groups, splitting power between the Maronite Christians, Greek Orthodox Christians, Sunni Muslims, Shia Muslims, and Druze, as well as stipulating some positions for the country's foreign policy. The first version of the pact, established in 1943, gave Christians a guaranteed majority in Parliament, reflecting the population of the country at the time, and specified that the highest office, the President of Lebanon, must be held by a Maronite Christian. Over the following decades, sectarian unrest would increase due to dissatisfaction with the greater power given to the Christian population and the refusal of the government to take another census that would provide the basis for a renegotiation of the National Pact eventually led to the Lebanese Civil War in 1975. The National Pact was renegotiated as part of the Taif Agreement to end the civil war, with the new conditions guaranteeing parliamentary parity between Muslim and Christian populations and reducing the power of the position of the Maronite President of Lebanon relative to the Sunni Prime Minister of Lebanon.

== Malaysia ==
The status of religious freedom in Malaysia is a controversial issue. Islam is the official state religion and the Constitution of Malaysia provides for limited freedom of religion, notably placing control upon proselytization of religions other than Islam to Muslims. Non-Muslims who wish to marry Muslims and have their marriage recognized by the government must convert to Islam. However, questions including whether Malays can convert from Islam and whether Malaysia is an Islamic state or secular state remains unresolved. For the most part the multiple religions within Malaysia interact peacefully and exhibit mutual respect. This is evident by the continued peaceful co-existence of cultures and ethnic groups, although sporadic incidences of violence against Hindu temples, Muslim prayer halls, and Christian churches have occurred as recently as 2010.

Restrictions on religious freedom are also in place for Muslims who belong to denominations of Islam other than Sunni Islam, such as Shia Muslims and Ahmaddiya Muslims.

=== Illegal words in Penang state ===
In 2010, a mufti in Penang decreed a fatwa that would forbid non-Muslims to use of 40 words related to Muslim religious practice. Under the Penang Islamic Religious Administration Enactment of 2004, a mufti in Penang state could propose fatwa that would be enforceable by law. The list included words such as "Allah", "Imam", "Sheikh", and "Fatwa", and purported to also make illegal the use of translations of these words into other languages. This decree caused uproar, particularly in the Sikh community, as Sikh religious texts use the term "Allah", with members of the community calling the law unconstitutional. The ban was overturned in 2014, as Penang lawmakers decreed that the Penang Islamic Religious Administration Enactment law only gave the Mufti permission to pass fatwas for the Muslim community, and that these bans were not enforceable on non-Muslim individuals.

== Maldives ==
The constitution of Maldives designates Islam as the state religion, requires citizens of Maldives to be Muslim, and requires public office holders, including the president, to be followers of Sunni Islam. The constitution provides for limitations on rights and freedoms “to protect and maintain the tenets of Islam.” Propagation of any religion other than Islam is a criminal offense. The law criminalizes speech breaking Islamic tenets, breaching social norms, or threatening national security. Antiterror legislation bans the promotion of “unlawful” religious ideologies. The penal code permits the administration of certain Sharia punishments, such as stoning and amputation of hands, although such punishments are rarely used in sentencing.

The Ministry of Islamic Affairs (MIA) maintains control over all matters pertaining to religion, and oversees the content of sermons given by imams at Friday services, as well as enforcing strict rules on who is allowed to legally preach within the country.

The law prohibits importation of any items deemed contrary to Islam by the MIA, including religious literature, religious statues, alcohol, pork products, and pornographic materials. Foreigners visiting the country are not allowed to publicly display religious symbols for religions other than Islam.

The constitution states education shall strive to “inculcate obedience to Islam” and “instill love for Islam.” In accordance with the law, the MIA regulates Islamic instruction in schools, while the Ministry of Education funds salaries of religious instructors in schools.

=== Societal attitudes ===
In 2022, non-governmental organizations reported incidents of people who are seen as “secularists” or “apostates” receiving death threats, as well as community pressure on women to wear hijabs and self-censorship by media outlets on matters related to Islam.

=== Incidents ===
Following the killing of secular blogger Yameen Rasheed in 2017, the president Abdulla Yameen issued a statement that criticized "anti-Islamic" bloggers and condoned the killing, saying that "hate speech" could cause "certain elements" within society to "do anything to these people".

In the past, the government of Maldives has issued court summons to expatriates for posting "anti-Islamic" content online.

== Mongolia ==
The Constitution of Mongolia provides for freedom of religion, and the Mongolian Government generally respects this right in practice; however, the law limits proselytism, and some religious groups have faced bureaucratic difficulties regarding registration. There have been few reports of societal abuses or discrimination based on religious belief or practice.

In 2023, the country was scored 4 out of 4 for religious freedom.

== Myanmar ==
Every year since 1999 the U.S. State Department has designated Myanmar as a country of particular concern with regard to religious freedom. Religious minorities, and particularly Muslims of the Rohingya ethnic group, face discrimination at the hands of the Buddhist majority, often with governmental indifference or even active encouragement.

=== Genocide of Rohingya Muslims ===
The Rohingya people have been denied Burmese citizenship since the Burmese nationality law (1982 Citizenship Act) was enacted. The Government of Myanmar claims that the Rohingya are illegal immigrants who arrived during the British colonial era, and were originally Bengalis. The Rohingya that are allowed to stay in Myanmar are considered 'resident foreigners' and not citizens. They are not allowed to travel without official permission and were previously required to sign a commitment not to have more than two children, though the law was not strictly enforced. Many Rohingya children cannot have their birth registered, thus rendering them stateless from the moment they are born. In 1995, the Government of Myanmar responded to UNHCR's pressure by issuing basic identification cards, which does not mention the bearer's place of birth, to the Rohingya. Without proper identification and documents, the Rohingya people are officially stateless with no state protection and their movements are severely restricted. As a result, they are forced to live in squatter camps and slums.

Starting in late 2016, the Myanmar military forces and extremist Buddhists began a major crackdown on the Rohingya Muslims in the country's western region of Rakhine State. The crackdown was in response to attacks on border police camps by unidentified insurgents, and has resulted in wide-scale human rights violations at the hands of security forces, including extrajudicial killings, gang rapes, arsons, and other brutalities. Since 2016, the military and the local Buddhists have killed at least 10,000 Rohingya people, burned down and destroyed 354 Rohingya villages in Rakhine state, and looted many Rohingya houses. The United Nations has described the persecution as "a textbook example of ethnic cleansing". In late September 2017, a seven-member panel of the Permanent Peoples' Tribunal found the Myanmar military and the Myanmar authority guilty of the crime of genocide against the Rohingya and the Kachin minority groups. The Myanmar leader and State Counsellor Aung San Suu Kyi was criticized for her silence over the issue and for supporting the military actions. Subsequently, in November 2017, the governments of Bangladesh and Myanmar signed a deal to facilitate the return of Rohingya refugees to their native Rakhine state within two months, drawing a mixed response from international onlookers.

According to the United Nations reports, as of January 2018, nearly 690,000 Rohingya people had fled or had been driven out of Rakhine state who then took shelter in the neighboring Bangladesh as refugees. By the end of 2022, the UNHCR reported that approximately 148,000 Rohingya were being held in displacement camps in the country.

On February 1, 2021, Prime Minister Aung San Suu Kyi was arrested and deposed by the military and the country came under military rule; over the next two years, 20,000 people were arrested, 1.3 million people were displaced and many churches, temples and mosques were destroyed.

== Nepal ==
Nepal has been a secular state since the end of the Nepalese Civil War in 2006, and the Constitution of Nepal adopted in 2015 guarantees religious freedom to all people in Nepal. The Constitution also defines Nepal as a secular state that is neutral toward the religions present in the country. The Constitution also bans actions taken to convert people from one religion to another, as well as acts that disturb the religion of other people.

There have been sporadic incidents of violence against the country's Christian minority. In 2009 and 2015, Christian churches were bombed by anti-government Hindu nationalist groups such as the Nepal Defence Army.

In 2022, there were several reports of individuals being arrested during their expression of religious freedom; this was mainly in regard to proselytizing or the law on killing cattle.

== Oman ==
The Basic Law of Oman declares that Islam is the state religion, that Shari'a is the source of legislation, and that the Sultan of Oman must be a Muslim. It also prohibits discrimination based on religion and provides for the freedom to practice religious rites as long as doing so does not disrupt public order. The government generally respects this right, but within defined parameters that placed limitations on the right in practice.

=== Government practices ===
Religious gatherings in locations other than government-approved houses of worship are forbidden, although this is not enforced in practice. Religious organizations seeking to import religious texts must request approval from the Ministry of Endowments and Religious Affairs (MERA).

Omani law prohibits the defamation of any Abrahamic religion. Public proselytization is also forbidden. The MERA monitors sermons to ensure that their content is politically acceptable to the government.

Civil courts adjudicate cases according to the nonsectarian civil code. The law states Shia Muslims may resolve family and personal status cases according to Shia jurisprudence outside the courts, and retain the right to transfer their cases to civil courts if they cannot find a resolution within the Shia religious tradition. The law allows non-Muslims to seek adjudication of matters pertaining to family or personal status under the religious laws of their faith or under civil law.

Citizens may sue the government for violations of their right to practice religious rites that do not disrupt public order; there are no known cases of anyone pursuing this course in court.

=== Education ===
Islamic studies are mandatory for Muslim students in public schools from kindergarten through 12th grade. Non-Muslim students are exempt from this requirement if they notify school administrators they do not wish to attend such instruction. The classes take a historical perspective in comparing the evolution of Islamic religious thinking, and teachers are prohibited from proselytizing or favoring one Islamic group over another. Many private schools provide alternative religious studies courses.

=== Societal attitudes ===
Conversion from Islam was reportedly viewed extremely negatively within the Muslim community; in 2017, the Anti-Defamation League and Simon Wiesenthal Center reported separate occasions of an antisemitic cartoon and article published in the Alwatan newspaper.

== Pakistan ==
Pakistan's penal code includes provisions that forbid blasphemy against any religion recognized by the government of Pakistan. Punishments are more severe for blasphemy against Islam: while acts insulting others' religion can carry a penalty of up to 10 years in prison and a fine, desecration of the Quran can carry a life sentence and insulting or otherwise defiling the name of Muhammad can carry a death sentence. The death sentence for blasphemy has never been implemented, however, 51 people charged under the blasphemy laws have been murdered by vigilantes before their trials could be completed.

The Pakistan government does not formally ban the public practice of the Ahmadi Muslim sect, but its practice is restricted severely by law. A 1974 constitutional amendment declared Ahmadis to be a non-Muslim minority because, according to the Government, they do not accept Muhammad as the last prophet of Islam. However, Ahmadis consider themselves to be Muslims and observe Islamic practices. In 1984, under Ordinance XX the government added Section 298(c) into the Penal Code, prohibiting Ahmadis from calling themselves Muslim or posing as Muslims; from referring to their faith as Islam; from preaching or propagating their faith; from inviting others to accept the Ahmadi faith; and from insulting the religious feelings of Muslims.

== Palestinian territories ==
=== The West Bank ===
In the West Bank, Israel and the Palestinian National Authority (PA) enforce varying aspects of religious freedom. The laws of both Israel and the Palestinian National Authority protect religious freedom, and generally enforce these protections in practice. The PA enforces the Palestinian Basic Law, which provides for the freedom of religion, belief, and practice within the territories it administers. It also holds that Islam is the official religion of the Palestinian Territories, and that legislation should be based on interpretations of Islamic Law. Six seats in the 132-member Palestinian Legislative Council are reserved for Christians, while no other religious guarantees or restrictions are enforced. The PA recognizes a Friday-Saturday weekend, but allows Christians to work on Saturday in exchange for a day off on Sunday. Heightened tensions exist between Jewish and non-Jewish residents of this territory, although relations between other religious groups are relatively cordial.

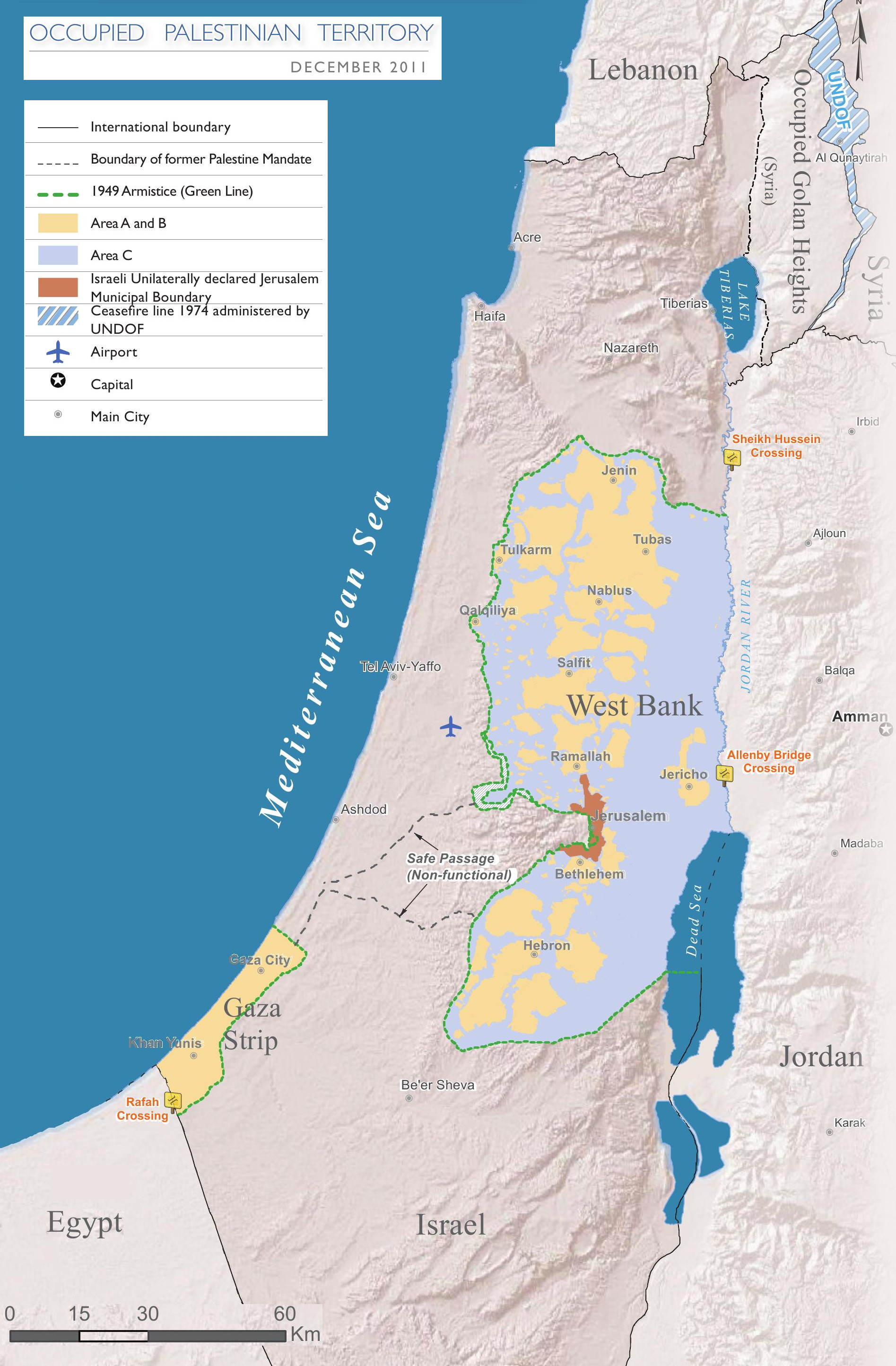
Map showing Palestinian territories and part of Israel.

The Palestinian Authority provides funding for Muslim and Christian holy sites in the West Bank and has been noted to give preferential treatment to Muslim sites, while the Israeli Government funds Jewish sites. Matters of inheritance, marriage, and dowry are handled by religious courts of the appropriate religion for the people in question, with members of faiths unrecognized by the PA are often advised to go abroad to resolve their affairs. Religious education is mandatory for grades 1 through 6 in schools funded by the PA, with separate courses available for Muslims and Christians.

While it is not strictly a religious ban, Israeli policies restricting the freedom of movement of Palestinians throughout the West Bank and between the West Bank and Israel restrict the ability for Palestinians to visit certain religious sites, such as the Church of the Holy Sepulchre, the Masjid Al-Aqsa, and the Church of the Nativity. These restrictions are sometimes relaxed for portions of the population on specific holidays. Christian groups have complained that an extended visa application process for the West Bank has impeded their ability to operate there. Jews are routinely provided access to specific holy sites in territories under the control of the PA, and holy sites that are significant to both Jews and Muslims, such as the Cave of the Patriarchs, enforce restricted access to either group on different days, with Jews often facing less restricted access and lighter security screening.

==== Gaza Strip ====
Despite nominally being a part of the territory administered by the Palestinian National Authority, the Gaza Strip has been de facto controlled by Hamas since the 2006 Palestinian civil skirmishes. Religious freedom in Gaza is curtailed by Hamas, which imposes a stricter interpretation of Islamic law and at times has broadcast explicitly anti-Jewish propaganda. Due to the blockade of the Gaza Strip, Muslim residents of Gaza are not allowed by the Israeli government to visit holy sites in Israel or the West Bank, and Christian clergy from outside Gaza are not allowed access to the region. However, some Christian residents of Gaza have been issued permits by Israel to enter Israel and the West Bank during Christmas to visit family and holy sites.

Hamas largely tolerates the Christian population of the Gaza Strip and does not force Christians to follow Islamic law. However, Christians at times face harassment, and there are concerns that Hamas does not sufficiently protect them from religiously motivated violence perpetrated by other groups in the Gaza Strip.

== Philippines ==
The 1987 Constitution of the Philippines mandates a separation of church and state, significantly limiting the Catholic Church's influence in the country's politics.

The Moro people are a Muslim ethnoreligious minority in the Philippines that have historically fought insurgencies against the government of the Philippines (as well as against previous occupying powers, such as Spain, the United States, and Japan). They have faced discrimination from the country's Christian majority in the 21st century, mainly in the area of employment.

== Qatar ==
In Qatar, the constitution, as well as certain laws, provide for freedom of association, public assembly, and worship in accordance with the requirements of public order and morality. Notwithstanding this, the law prohibits proselytizing by non-Muslims and places some restrictions on public worship. Islam is the state religion.

=== Legal system and restrictions ===
Both Muslims and non-Muslims are tried under the unified court system, incorporating both secular law and Shari'a (Islamic law). Convicted Muslims may earn a sentence reduction of a few months by memorizing the Qur'an.

The law provides for a prison sentence of up to seven years for defaming, desecrating, or committing blasphemy against Islam, Christianity, or Judaism.

Religious groups are required to register with the government. Unregistered religious groups that engage in worship activities are illegal, and members of those groups are subject to deportation. However, this is rarely enforced, and non-registered religious groups have been able to worship in private without disruption.

Converting to another religion from Islam is considered apostasy and is technically a capital offense; however, since the country gained independence in 1971, there has been no recorded execution or other punishment for such an act.

The government regulates the publication, importation, and distribution of all religious books and materials. However, in the past, individuals and religious institutions were not prevented from importing holy books and other religious items for personal or congregational use. Non-Muslim religious symbols are not allowed to be displayed in public, but representatives of minority religious communities in Qatar have previously reported that they were allowed to wear traditional religious garments.

From 2017 to 2020, the government discouraged Qatari citizens and residents from taking part in the Umra or annual Hajj due to the severing of relations between Qatar and Saudi Arabia, permission was again granted in 2021.

=== Education ===
Islamic instruction is compulsory for all students in state-sponsored schools. While there were no restrictions on non-Muslims providing private religious instruction for children, most foreign children attended secular private schools. Muslim children were allowed to go to secular and coeducational private schools.

=== Societal attitudes ===
Media based in the country periodically published antisemitic material, usually in the form of cartoons, although images are being removed, particularly in school textbooks.

== Saudi Arabia ==
The Kingdom of Saudi Arabia is an Islamic theocratic absolute monarchy in which Islam is the official religion. Religious status (defined as "Muslim" or "Non-Muslim") is identified on government-issued identity cards. In the past, non-Muslims have faced many restrictions, including bans on non-Muslim religious texts and the dismissal of their testimony in court, although a new law in 2021 has overturned the favoritism of evidence. Officially, the government supports the rights of non-Muslims to practice their faith in private, but non-Muslim organizations claim that there is no clear definition of what constitutes public or private, and that this leaves them at risk for punishment, which can include lashes and deportation. The government of Saudi Arabia does not allow non-Muslim clergy to enter the country for the purpose of conducting services, which further restricts practice, although they can enter to minister to their own communities.

Members of the Shi’a minority are the subjects of officially sanctioned political and economic discrimination, although the faith is not entirely banned. Shi'a Muslims are barred from employment in the government, military, and oil industries. Ahmadiyya Muslims are officially barred from the country, although many Saudi residents and citizens practice the religion privately.

It is illegal for Muslims to convert or renounce their religion, which is nominally punishable by death. Death sentences have been mandated as recently as 2015, although the most recent execution performed in Saudi Arabia solely for apostasy charges was conducted in 1994. In 2014, the government of Saudi Arabia passed new regulations against terrorism that defined "calling for atheist thought in any form, or calling into question the fundamentals of the Islamic religion on which [Saudi Arabia] is based" as a form of terrorism.

The Saudi Mutaween (Arabic: مطوعين), or Committee for the Propagation of Virtue and the Prevention of Vice (i.e., the religious police) have enforced an interpretation of Muslim religious law in public, employing both armed and unarmed officers; in the early 2020s, the Committee is focussing on developing Islamic awareness campaigns.

Islamic religious education is mandatory in public schools at all levels. All public school children receive religious instruction that conforms with the official version of Islam. Non-Muslim students in private schools are not required to study Islam. Private religious schools are permitted for non-Muslims or for Muslims adhering to unofficial interpretations of Islam.

== Singapore ==
The constitution provides for freedom of religion; this is subject to restrictions for public order, public health and morality.

In 1972 the Singapore government de-registered and banned the activities of Jehovah's Witnesses in Singapore on the grounds that its members refuse to perform military service (which is obligatory for all male citizens), salute the flag, or swear oaths of allegiance to the state; the Unification church is banned on the grounds of being a “cult” which could have detrimental effects on society.

Singapore has banned all written materials published by the International Bible Students Association and the Watchtower Bible and Tract Society, both publishing arms of the Jehovah's Witnesses. A person who possesses a prohibited publication can be fined up to $1500 (Singapore Dollars $2,000) and jailed up to 12 months for a first conviction.

== Sri Lanka ==
The Constitution of Sri Lanka provides for the freedom of practice of all religions, while reserving a higher status for Buddhism. At times, local police and government officials appeared to be acting in concert with Buddhist nationalist organizations. In the past, NGOs have alleged that government officials provided assistance, or at least tacitly supported the actions of societal groups targeting religious minorities.

Matters related to family law, e.g., divorce, child custody and inheritance are adjudicated under customary law of the applicable ethnic or religious group. For example, the minimum age of marriage for women is 18 years, except in the case of Muslims, who in the past followed their customary religious practices of girls attaining marrying age with the onset of puberty and men when they are financially capable of supporting a family. In 2023, it was reported that 10% of 18-year-old women in Sri Lanka were married.

During the Sri Lankan Civil War, conflict between Tamil separatists and the government of Sri Lanka at times resulted in violence against temples and other religious targets. However, the primary causes of the conflict were not religious.

== Syria ==
The constitution of the Syrian Arab Republic guarantees freedom of religion. Syria has had two constitutions: one passed in 1973, and one in 2012 through a referendum. Opposition groups rejected the referendum; claiming that the vote was rigged. Political instability caused by the Syrian Civil War has deepened religious sectarianism within the country, as well as creating regions in the country where the official government does not have the ability to enforce its laws.

Syria has come under international condemnation over their alleged "anti-Semitic" state media, and for alleged "sectarianism towards Sunni Muslims"; religious education in either Islam or Christianity is mandatory at public schools, while Tahrir al-Sham runs religious schools in certain parts of the country.

The government enforces several measures against what it considers to be Islamic fundamentalism. The Muslim Brotherhood, a political Sunni Muslim organization, is banned in Syria, alongside other Muslim sects that the government considers to be Salafi or Islamist. Those accused of membership in any such organization can be sentenced to long prison terms or the death penalty. In 2010, the Syrian government banned the use of the niqab in universities.

Jehovah's Witnesses in Syria face persecution, as the government banned their religion in 1964 for being a "Zionist organization".

Military situation as of August 2018. Territory in red is controlled by the Syrian Arab Republic, territory in green is controlled by the Syrian opposition (including the Free Syrian Army), territory in yellow is controlled by the Democratic Federation of Northern Syria, territory in gray is controlled by the Islamic State of Iraq and the Levant, and territory in white is controlled by Tahrir al-Sham. For a more detailed, up-to-date, and interactive map, see Template:Syrian Civil War detailed map

=== Democratic Federation of Northern Syria ===
The charter of the Democratic Federation of Northern Syria (also known as Rojava) guarantees the freedom of religion to people living within its territory. The government of this region employs various measures to ensure the representation of various ethnic and religious groups in the government, using a system that has been compared to Lebanon's confessionalist system. However, there have been numerous claims made by refugees that YPG units affiliated with the Democratic Federation have forcibly displaced Sunni Arabs from their homes, in addition to destroying businesses and crops. These claims have been denied by Syrian Kurdish authorities.

=== Free Syrian Army ===
Battalions affiliated with the Free Syrian Army have been accused of taking hostages and murdering members of religious minorities in territory held by their soldiers.

=== Jihadist groups ===
Jihadist groups, such as the Islamic State of Iraq and the Levant and Jabhat Al-Nusra have enforced very strict interpretations of Sunni religious lat thrown out by Islamists"|date=26 June 2012|access-date=15 May 2014|agency=Agenzia Fides}}

=== Jihadist groups ===
Jihadist groups, such as the Islamic State of Iraq and the Levant and Jabhat Al-Nusra have enforced very strict interpretations of Sunni religious law in their territory, executing civilians for blasphemy, adultery, and other charges. Watchdog organizations have documented extensive persecution of Yazidi people, particularly women, who have been routinely forced into sexual slavery by the Islamic State in what Human Rights Watch described as an "organized system of rape and sexual assault".

== Taiwan ==
Article 13 of the Constitution of the Republic of China provides that the people shall have freedom of religious belief.

In 2022, the country was scored 4 out of 4 for religious freedom.

== Tajikistan ==
Freedom of religion in Tajikistan is provided for in Tajikistan's constitution, which also states that the country is a secular state.

Tajikistan is unique for barring minors from attending public religious ceremonies, with the exception of funerals (where they must be accompanied by an adult guardian). In the past, Hanafi mosques bar women from attending services, a policy decreed by a religious council with support from the government; minors were allowed to practice religion in private.

Tajikistan's policies reflect a concern about Islamic extremism, a concern shared by much of the general population. The government actively monitors the activities of religious institutions to keep them from becoming overtly political. In the past, a Tajikistan Ministry of Education policy prohibited girls from wearing the hijab at public schools. In 2022, there is no law against wearing the hijab, although this may be discouraged in society.

== Thailand ==
The constitution of Thailand prohibits discrimination based on religious belief and protects religious liberty, but also stipulates that the government should promote Theravada Buddhism and that the King of Thailand is required to be Buddhist. There is an ongoing insurgency in the southern part of the country, which is motivated by ethnic and religious separatism by Malay Muslims.

=== Legal framework ===
The law officially recognizes five religious groups: Buddhism, Islam, Brahman Hinduism, Sikhism, and Christianity; the king is required to be a Buddhist.

The Ministry of Justice allows the practice of sharia as a special legal process, outside of the national civil code, for Muslim residents of the South for family law, including inheritance. Provincial courts apply this law and a sharia expert advises the judge.

Female Buddhist monks are not recognized by the government, and thus do not receive any of the privileges associated with monk status in the country.

=== Education ===
Religious education is required for all students at both the primary and secondary levels with no opting out; the curriculum must contain information about all of the five recognized umbrella religious groups in the country.

=== Insurgency ===
Because of the close ties between ethnicity and religion in Thailand, violence that is part of the ongoing insurgency in South Thailand is difficult to classify as being purely motivated by religious identity.

=== Other incidents ===
In October 2017, The Sangha Supreme Council issued an order prohibiting monks from using social media to criticize the kingdom, Buddhism, or the monarchy, or otherwise behaving in a manner inappropriate to their religious status.

== Timor-Leste ==
The constitution of Timor-Leste establishes the freedom of religion, and specifies that there is no state religion and that religious entities are separate from the state; however, a concordat with the Holy See grants the Catholic Church certain privileges. The government routinely provides funding to the Catholic Church, and other religious organizations may apply for funding.

Religious organizations are not required to register with the government, and can apply for tax-exemption status from the Ministry of Finance. Should an organization wish to run private schools or provide other community services, registration with the Ministry of Justice is required.

Religious leaders have reported incidents where individual public servants have denied service to members of religious minorities, but do not consider this to be a systematic problem. The government has, however, routinely rejected birth and marriage certificates from religious organizations other than the Catholic Church. Civil certificates are the only option that religious minorities have for government recognition of marriages and births.

Representatives of the Catholic, Protestant, and Muslim communities in Timor-Leste maintain good relations with each other.

== Turkey ==
The Constitution of Turkey establishes the country as a secular state and provides for freedom of belief and worship and the private dissemination of religious ideas. However, other constitutional provisions for the integrity of the secular state restrict these rights. The constitution prohibits discrimination on religious grounds.

The penal code prohibits imams, priests, rabbis and other religious leaders from "reproaching or vilifying" the government or the laws of the state while performing their duties, punishable by several months in prison.

Religious affiliation is noted on the chips of national identity cards. Members of some religious groups, such as the Baháʼí, are unable to state their religious affiliation on their cards because it is not included among the option, and thus must report their religion as "unknown" or "other".

=== Treatment of Muslims ===
The Turkish government oversees Muslim religious facilities and education through its Directorate of Religious Affairs, under the authority of the Prime Minister. The directorate regulates the operation of the country's 89,817 registered mosques and employs local and provincial imams (who are civil servants). Sunni imams are appointed and paid by the state. Historically, Turkey's Alevi Muslim minority has been discriminated against within the country. However, since the 2000s, various measures granting Alevis more equal recognition as a religious group have been passed at the local and national levels of government. In the past, other Muslim minorities, such as Shia Muslims, largely have not faced government interference in their religious practice, but also received no support from the state.

Since the 2000s Turkish Armed Forces have dismissed several members for alleged Islamic fundamentalism.

=== Treatment of other religious groups ===
In the 1970s, the Turkish High Court of Appeals issued a ruling allowing for the expropriation of properties acquired after 1936 from religious minorities. Later rulings in the 2000s have restored some of this property, and generally allow minorities to acquire new properties. However, the government has continued to apply an article allowing it to expropriate properties in areas where the local non-Muslim population drops significantly or where the foundation is deemed to no longer perform the function for which it was created. There is no specific minimum threshold for such a population drop, which is left to the discretion of the GDF. This is problematic for small populations (such as the Greek Orthodox community), since they maintain more properties than the local community needs; many are historic or significant to the Orthodox world.

Greek Orthodox, Armenian Orthodox and Jewish religious groups may operate schools under the supervision of the Education Ministry; Armenian asylum seekers and refugees can also attend these schools, but cannot gain a diploma. The curricula of the schools include information unique to the cultures of the groups. The Ministry reportedly verifies if the child's father or mother is from that minority community before the child may enroll. Other non-Muslim minorities do not have schools of their own.

Jehovah's Witnesses have faced imprisonment and fines, largely connected to their religiously grounded conscientious objection to obligatory military service.

In the past, churches operating in Turkey have faced administrative challenges to employ foreign church personnel, apart from the Catholic Church and congregations linked to the diplomatic community. These administrative challenges, restrictions on training religious leaders and difficulty obtaining visas have led to a decrease in the Christian communities.

== Turkmenistan ==
The Constitution of Turkmenistan provides for freedom of religion and does not establish a state religion. However, the Government imposes legal restrictions on all forms of religious expression. All religious groups must register in order to gain legal status; unregistered religious activity is illegal and may be punished by administrative fines. While the 2003 law on religion and subsequent 2004 amendments had effectively restricted registration to only the two largest groups, Sunni Muslim and Russian Orthodox, and criminalized unregistered religious activity, the presidential decrees issued in 2004 dramatically reduced the numerical thresholds for registration and abolished criminal penalties for unregistered religious activity. Civil penalties (mainly fines) remain for activities including holding religious services, teaching religious education and receiving unauthorised funds from outside the country.

Ethnic Turkmen identity is linked to Islam. Ethnic Turkmen who converted from Islam reportedly received more societal scrutiny than non-Turkmen converts, especially in rural areas.

== United Arab Emirates ==
The constitution of the United Arab Emirates establishes Islam as the state religion. While it establishes the freedom of worship (so long as it does not interfere with public policy or morals), there are laws against blasphemy, and against proselytizing by non-Muslims.

=== Legal framework ===
According to the constitution, sharia is the principal source of legislation, although the judicial system applies two types of law, depending on the case. Sharia forms the basis for judicial decisions in most family law matters for Muslims, such as marriage and divorce, and inheritance for both Muslims and non-Muslims; however, in the case of noncitizens, the parties may petition the court to have the laws of their home country apply, rather than sharia. Sharia also applies in some criminal matters. Civil law provides the basis for decisions on all other matters. Shia Muslims in Dubai may pursue Shia family law cases through a special Shia council rather than through the regular judicial system. When sharia courts try non-Muslims for criminal offenses, judges have the discretion to impose civil or sharia penalties. Higher courts may overturn or modify sharia penalties.

Authorities conduct arrests under blasphemy and antidiscrimination laws that criminalize insulting religions. The General Authority of Islamic Affairs and Endowments (Awqaf) provides weekly guidance for the content of sermons in Sunni mosques, and the Fatwa Forum regulates the issuance of all fatwas. Shia mosques are considered private and managed primarily by the Jaafari Affairs Council, located in Dubai. The government continued to allow private worship of other religious groups and granted permission to build houses of worship on a case-by-case basis.

==== General restrictions ====
The law prohibits blasphemy, defined as any act insulting God, religions, prophets, messengers, holy books, or houses of worship. Other illegal activity includes practicising sorcery, “abusing” a holy shrine, labeling someone an infidel and holding meetings for provoking religious hatred; offenders are subject to fines up to two million dirhams (approximately US$545,000).

The law previously required Muslims and non-Muslims to refrain from eating, drinking, and smoking in public during fasting hours during the month of Ramadan; however, legislation passed in January 2022 overturned this requirement.

The law prohibits the distribution of religious literature the government determines is contradictory to Islam, as well as literature it deems blasphemous or offensive towards religions; Bibles and Hindu sacred texts are available in some bookstores.

==== Restrictions on minority religions ====
The law prohibits churches from erecting bell towers or displaying crosses or other religious symbols on the outside of their premises, although they may place signs on their properties indicating they are churches. The law also restricts land ownership to citizens, or companies majority-owned by citizens. This effectively prevents most minority religious communities (which consist of noncitizens) from purchasing property to build houses of worship. Under the law, Muslim men may marry non-Muslim women who are “people of the book” (Christian or Jewish). Muslim women may not marry non-Muslim men, and such marriages are not recognized. The government has generally decriminalized consensual extramarital sex, but in some circumstances it may be punishable by six months in prison. Non-Muslim wives of citizens are eligible for naturalization in some circumstances.

=== Education ===
Islamic studies are mandatory for all students in public schools and for Muslim students in private schools. The government does not provide instruction in any religion other than Islam in public schools. In private schools, non-Muslim students are not required to attend Islamic study classes. All students must take national social studies classes, which include some teaching on Islam. A small number of Christian-affiliated schools are authorized to provide instruction tailored to the religious background of the student.

=== Societal attitudes ===
According to non-Muslim religious groups, there was a high degree of tolerance within society for minority religious beliefs and traditions, although societal attitudes and behavior discouraged conversion from Islam. Conversion to Islam was encouraged, however.

In the past, anti-Semitic materials have been frequently available for purchase at book fairs. There were continued instances of anti-Semitic remarks on social media sites.

== Uzbekistan ==
The Constitution of Uzbekistan provides for freedom of religion and for the principle of separation of church and state. However, the government restricts these rights in practice. The government permits the operation of what it considers mainstream religious groups, including approved Muslim groups, Jewish groups, the Russian Orthodox Church, and various other Christian denominations, such as Roman Catholics, Lutherans, and Baptists. Uzbek society generally tolerates Christian churches as long as they do not attempt to win converts among ethnic Uzbeks. The law prohibits or severely restricts activities such as proselytizing, importing and disseminating religious literature, and offering private religious instruction.

Religious law was revised in 2021 and the registration process has been streamlined, but is still seen as inadequate, with many delays and denials.

A number of minority religious groups, including congregations of some Christian denominations, operate without registration because they have not satisfied the strict requirements set by the law. As in previous periods, Protestant groups with ethnic Uzbek members reported operating in a climate of harassment and fear. The government has been known to arrest and sentence Protestant pastors, and to otherwise raid and harass some unregistered groups, detaining and fining their leaders and members.

The government works against unauthorized Islamic groups suspected of extremist sentiments or activities, arresting numerous alleged members of these groups and sentencing them to lengthy jail terms. Many of these were suspected members of Hizb ut-Tahrir, a banned extremist Islamic political movement, the banned Islamic group Akromiya (Akromiylar), or unspecified Wahhabi groups. The government generally does not interfere with worshippers attending sanctioned mosques and granted approvals for new Islamic print, audio, and video materials.In the past, a small number of "underground" mosques operated under the close scrutiny of religious authorities and the security service.

Religious groups enjoyed generally tolerant relations; however, neighbors, family, and employers often continued to pressure ethnic Uzbek Christians, especially recent converts and residents of smaller communities. In the past, there have been were several reports of sermons against missionaries and persons who converted from Islam.

== Vietnam ==
The constitution formally allows religious freedom. Every citizen is declared to be allowed to freely follow no, one, or more religions, practice his or her religion without violating the law, be treated equally regardless of his or her religion, be protected from being violated his or her religious freedom, but is prohibited to use religion to violate the law.

All religious groups and most clergy must join a party controlled supervisory body, religions must obtain permission to build or repair houses of worship, run schools, engage in charity or ordain or transfer clergy, and some clergy remain in prison or under serious state repression.

== Yemen ==
Current (January 2026) political and military control in ongoing Yemeni Civil War (2014–present) Controlled by the Government of Yemen (under the Presidential Leadership Council since April 2022) and Saudi-led allies Controlled by Houthis-led Supreme Political Council Controlled by Al-Qaeda (AQAP) and ISIL-affiliated Ansar al-Sharia

The constitution declares Islam the state religion and sharia the source of all legislation in Yemen. It provides for freedom of thought and expression “within the limits of the law,” but does not mention freedom of religion. The law prohibits denunciation of Islam, conversion from Islam to another religion, and proselytizing directed at Muslims.

As a consequence of the ongoing Yemeni Civil War, the Cabinet of Yemen affiliated with former president Abdrabbuh Mansur Hadi only controls a portion of the country and is unable to enforce its laws elsewhere, with the Supreme Political Council, the Southern Transitional Council, and various Islamic fundamentalist groups controlling significant portions of the country. Violence from the conflict has resulted in the bombing destruction of many religious buildings by several different factions in the conflict.

=== Legal framework ===
The constitution states the president must be Muslim (“practices his Islamic duties”); however, it allows non-Muslims to run for parliament, as long as they “fulfill their religious duties.” The law does not prohibit political parties based on religion, but it states parties may not claim to be the sole representative of any religion, oppose Islam, or restrict membership to a particular religious group.

The criminal code states “deliberate” and “insistent” denunciation of Islam or conversion from Islam to another religion is apostasy, a capital offense. The law allows those charged with apostasy three opportunities to repent; upon repentance, they are absolved from the death penalty. It is illegal to proselytize to Muslims.

Family law prohibits marriage between a Muslim and an individual whom the law defines as an apostate. Muslim women may not marry non-Muslims, and Muslim men may not marry women who do not practice one of the Abrahamic religions. By law, a woman seeking custody of a child “ought not” to be an apostate; a man “ought” to be of the same faith as the child.

=== Supreme Political Council territories ===
According to the United Nations, Baháʼí community members in Sanaa faced a “persistent pattern of persecution,” including arrest and exile.

Prior to the outbreak of the military conflict, Christian community representatives reported increased scrutiny by Houthi rebels, leading them to be more discreet, although they continued to wear religious attire that identified them as members of the community.

In northern areas traditionally under Zaydi control, there have been reports of continued Houthi efforts to impose their religious customs on non-Zaydi residents, including by banning music and requiring women to wear full veils.

Abdul-Malik al-Houthi has stated there is Israeli involvement in the Saudi-led coalition campaign against Houthi rebels in speeches featuring anti-Semitic slogans, in addition to other religiously sectarian rhetoric.
