= Christianity in Algeria =

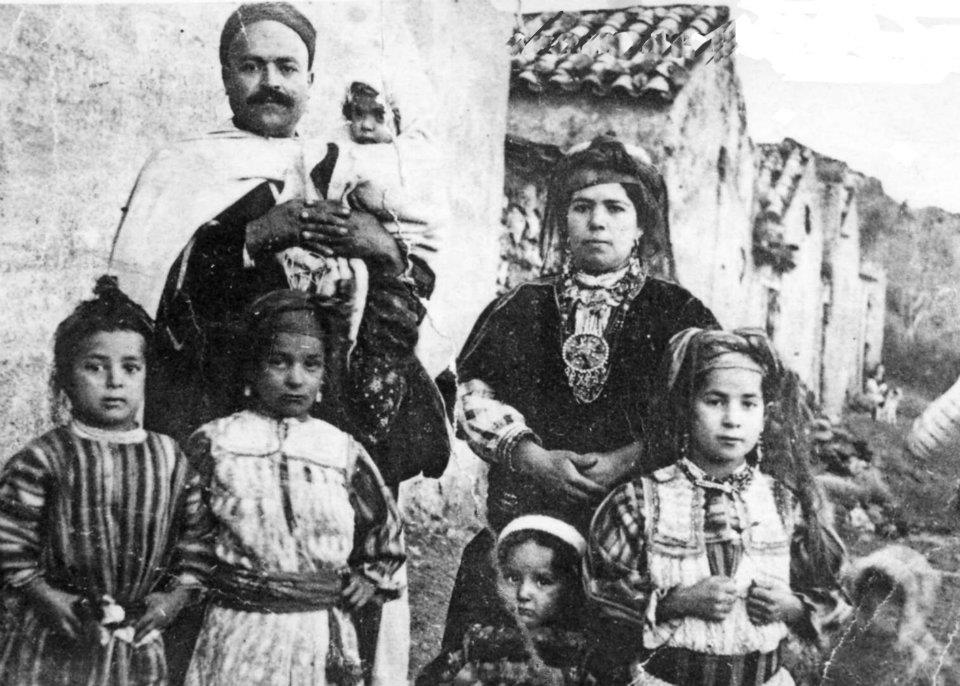
Christian Berber family from Kabylia.

Christianity came to North Africa during the Roman era. According to historian Theodor Mommsen what is now Mediterranean Algeria was fully Christian by the fifth century. A notable Berber Christian of Algeria was Saint Augustine, and his mother Saint Monica, both important saints in Christianity. Christianity's influence declined during the chaotic period of the Vandal invasions, but was strengthened in the succeeding Byzantine period. After the Arab conquests of the 7th century, Christianity began to gradually disappear.

Currently, North Africa is primarily Muslim: Islam is the state religion of Algeria, Libya, Morocco and Egypt. While the practice and expression of other faiths is guaranteed by law, the legal framework tends to restrict minority religions from proselytising, or even building and repairing churches. Converts to Christianity may be investigated, searched by the authorities, and punished. In 2009, the percentage of Christians in Algeria was less than 2%. In this same survey, the United Nations counted 100,000 Catholics and 45,000 Protestants in the country. Although Christians are a religious minority in Algeria, churches built during French rule can still be found.

In 1996, Pierre Claverie, the Bishop of Oran, was assassinated by terrorists. This murder occurred soon after the murder of the monks of Tibhirine. This terrorist act was part of a general trend of violence during the Algerian Civil War in the 1990s, commonly known as the Black Decade. During this time, between 100,000 and 200,000 Algerians lost their lives. Since 1960, an increasing number of Algerians have been converting to Christianity.

== Catholicism ==
=== Indigenous Christianity after the Arab conquest ===
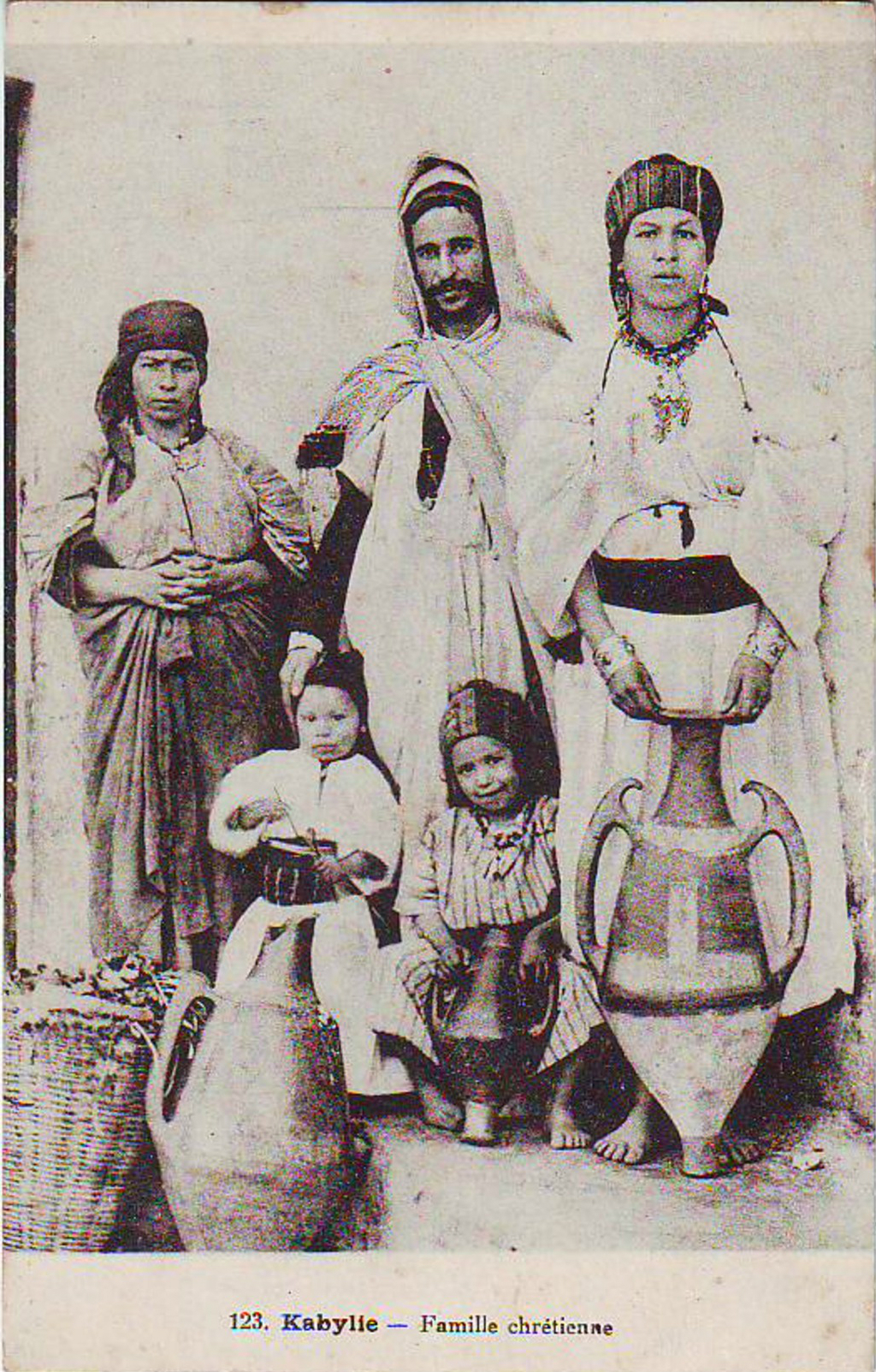
Christian Berber family from Kabylia.

The conventional historical view is that the conquest of North Africa by the Umayyad Caliphate, between 647 and 709 AD, effectively ended Christianity in North Africa for several centuries. The prevailing view is that the Church lacked the backbone of a monastic tradition and was still suffering from the aftermath of heresies including the Donatist heresy that contributed to the earlier obliteration of the Church in the present day Tamazgha.

However, new scholarship has appeared that disputes this. There are reports that the Christian faith persisted in the region from Tripolitania (present-day western Libya) to present-day Morocco for several centuries after the completion of the Arab conquest by 700 AD. A Christian community is recorded in 1114 in Qal'a in central Algeria. There is also evidence of religious pilgrimages after 850 AD to tombs of Christian saints outside of the city of Carthage, and evidence of religious contacts with Christians of Muslim Spain. In addition, calendar reforms adopted in Europe at this time were disseminated amongst the indigenous Christians of Tunis, which would have not been possible had there been an absence of contact with Rome.

Local Christianity came under pressure when the Muslim fundamentalist regimes of the Almohads and Almoravids came into power, and the record shows demands that local Christians of Tunis convert to Islam. There are reports of Christian inhabitants and a bishop in the city of Kairouan around 1150 AD - a significant report, since this city was founded by Arab Muslims around 680 AD as their administrative center after their conquest. The indigenous Christian population in M'zab persisted until the 11th century. A letter in Catholic Church archives from the 14th century shows that there were four bishoprics in North Africa, admittedly a sharp decline from the over four hundred bishoprics in existence at the time of the Arab conquest. Berber Christians continued to live in Tunis and Nefzaoua in the south of Tunisia up until the first quarter of the 15th century.

=== Reintroduction of Christianity during French colonialism ===
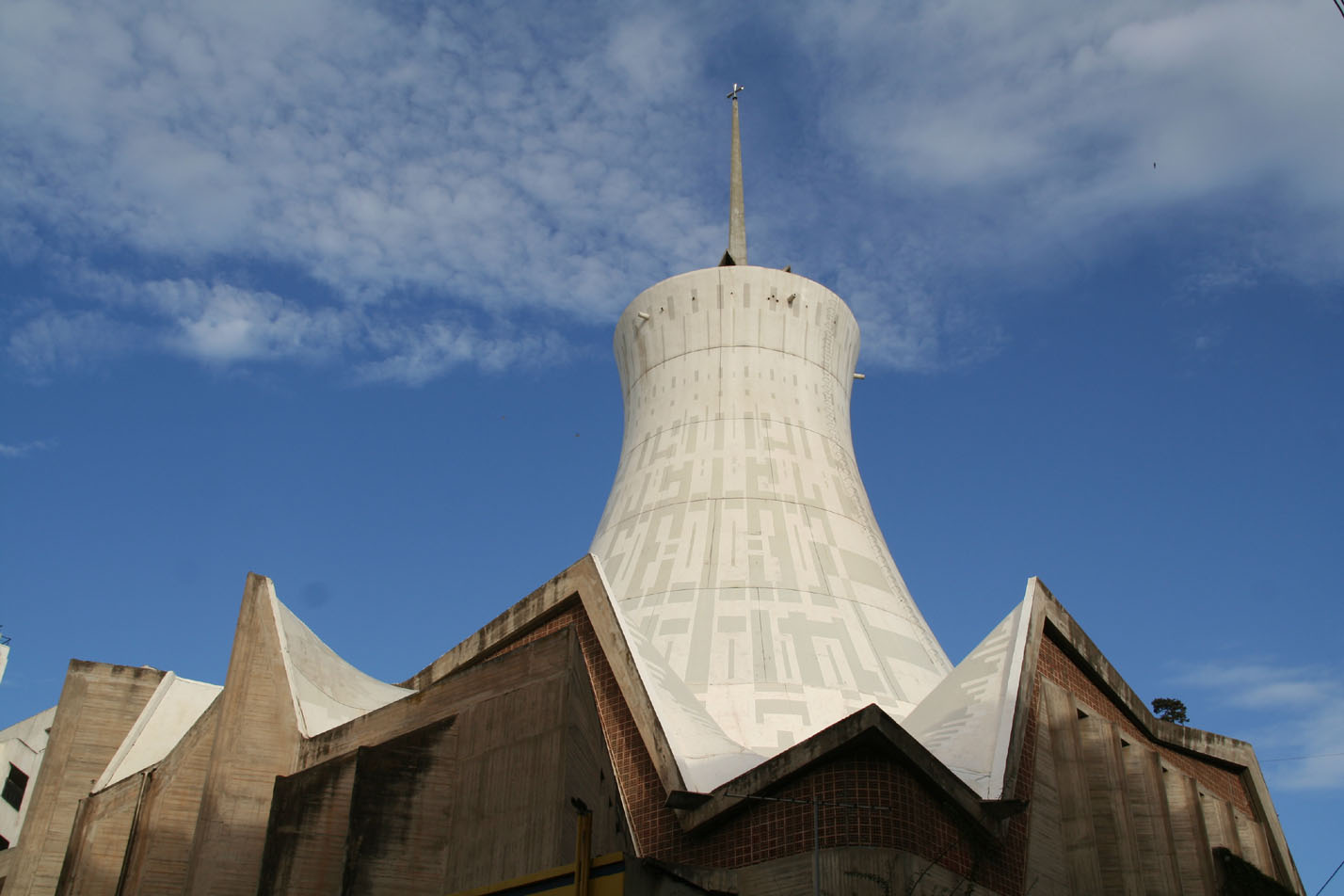
Cathédrale du Sacré-Cœur d'Alger in Algiers, Algeria

The Catholic Church was reintroduced in Algeria after the French conquest, when the Diocese of Algiers was established in 1838. As of the last census in Algeria, taken on 1 June 1960, there were 1,050,000 non-Muslim civilians (mostly Catholic) in Algeria (10 percent of the total population including 130,000 Algerian Jews). Most of them were of French, Italian or Spanish origin.

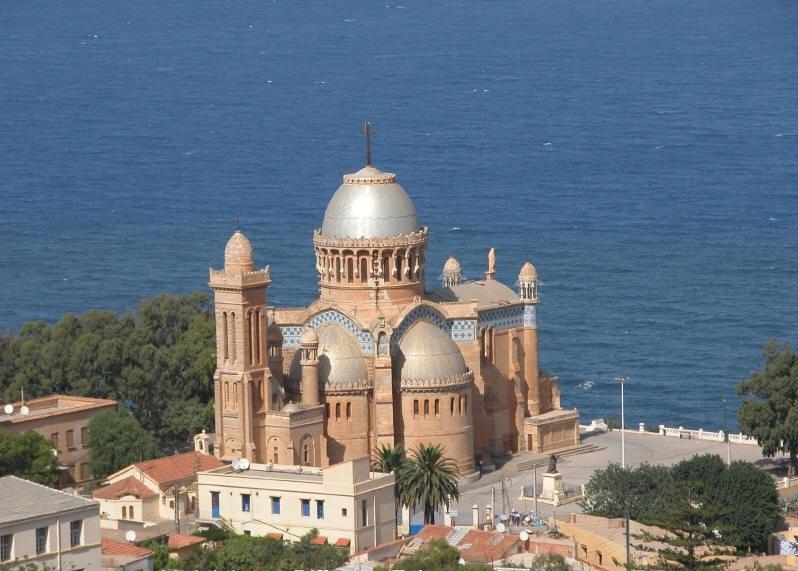
The basilica of Our Lady of Africa in Algiers.

Under French rule, the Catholic population of Algeria peaked at over one million. The country was divided into four dioceses, including one archdiocese:

- Roman Catholic Archdiocese of Algiers
  - Diocese of Constantine
  - Diocese of Oran
- Diocese of Laghouat (Immediately subject to the Holy See)

During French rule, Christianity was used as a tool of assimilation. French colonizers attempted to convert the Muslim population to Christianity as a form of modernization. Laws were put in place to establish Algerians’ rights as citizens based on religion. The Crémieux Decree of 1870 denied Muslim Algerians full citizenship status while granting local Christian and Algerian Jewish inhabitants full citizenship. Very few Algerians converted because of this law. The religion-based citizenship divides established during the French colonial rule sparked animosity between groups that would impact the stance of minority religions in Algeria for years post-colonial rule.

=== Christianity after independence ===
After Algeria became independent in 1962, about 800,000 Pieds-Noirs of French nationality were evacuated to European France. The majority of those who evacuated were Christian or Jewish. Approximately 200,000 Algerian inhabitants of French nationality chose to remain in Algeria. The number of people with French nationality has continued to decrease over the decades. There were approximately 100,000 in 1965 and about 50,000 by the end of the 1960s.

Proselytization of the Muslim population was at first strictly prohibited; later the prohibition was less vigorously enforced, but few conversions took place. The several Catholic missions established in Algeria mostly worked on charitable and relief work, the establishment of schools, workshops, and infirmaries, and the training of staff for the new establishments. Some of the missionaries of these organizations remained in the country after independence, working among the poorer segments of the population. In the early 1980s, the Catholic population numbered about 45,000, most of whom were foreigners or Algerians who had married French or Italians.

Since independence, there has been a rise of Islamic fundamentalism. The 1996 murder of Pierre Claverie, Bishop of Oran was an act of violence by Islamic extremist terrorists against the Christian community. In the same year, seven monks of the Abbey of Our Lady of Atlas were killed though it remains uncertain as to who killed them. Pierre Claverie and the seven monks were beatified in a mass also attended by Muslims at the Shrine of Our Lady of the Holy Cross in Oran on 8 December 2018.

== Protestantism ==
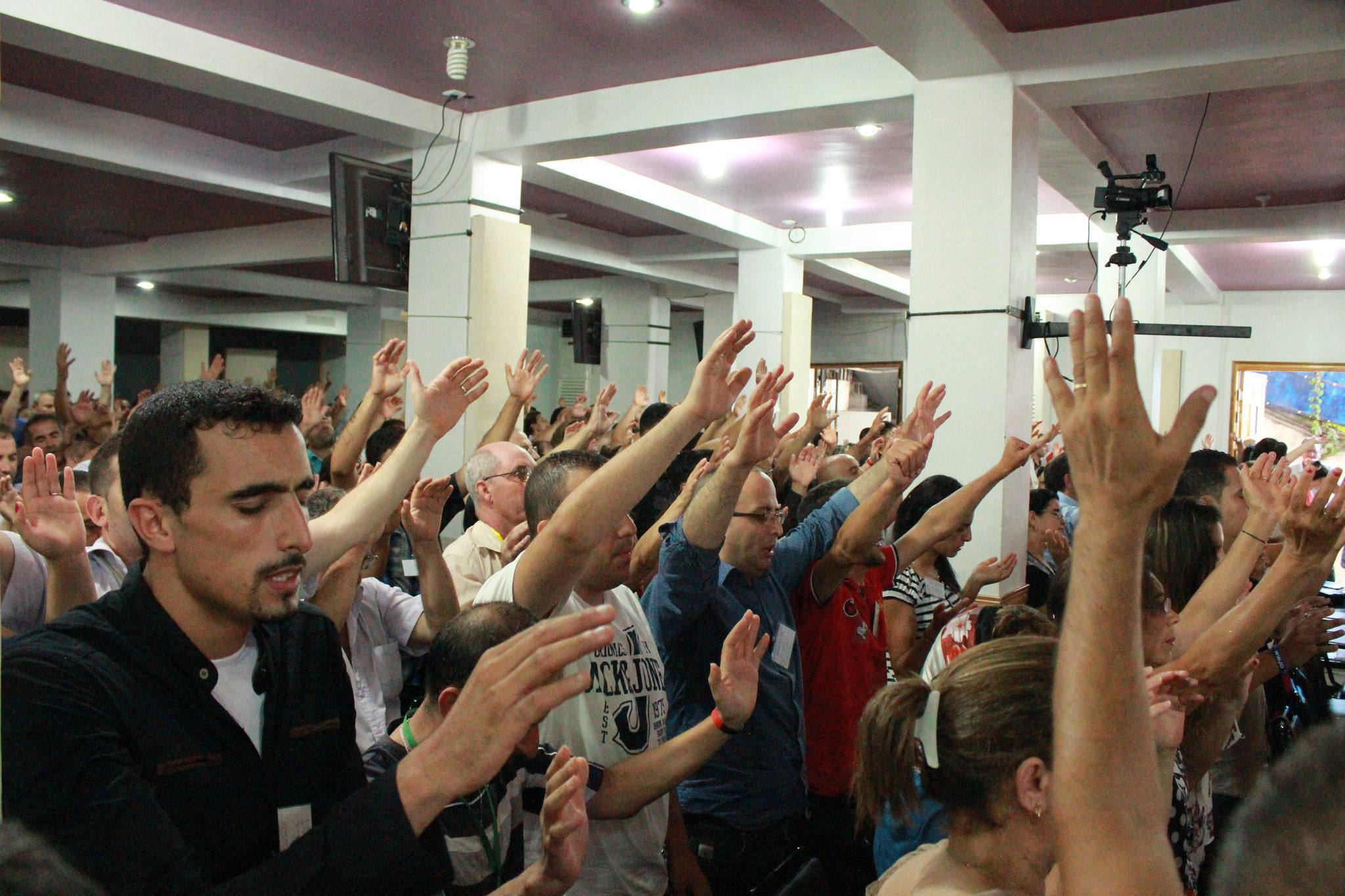
Kabyle Christians from Algeria.

Protestants numbered approximately 45,000 in Algeria in 2011, according to more conservative estimates. Figures in 2020 suggest that Protestants make up 0.03% of the country's population (or one in 10 Christians).

Since 2006 missionary outreach among Muslims can be punished with up to five years of prison. The Protestant Church of Algeria is a united church formed by the Methodist Church and Reformed Church with about 10,000 members. The Protestant Church of Algeria is one of only two officially recognized Christian organizations in the country.

According to the ICC, most Christians meet in homes, to protect themselves. The country's Minister of Religious Affairs has called the evangelical churches "dangerous." The Universal Periodic Review (UPR) in November looked at the government’s treatment of the Ahmadi Muslim and Protestant Christian communities, noting “State-inflicted harassment". Protestants and Catholics have noted long delays on obtaining visas for religious workers.

Since November 2017, 17 churches, members of the Protestant Church of Algeria, have been closed by the Algerian authorities, who justify these closures by a lack of authorisation from the National Commission for the exercise of non-Muslim worship. According to the Protestant Church of Algeria, this Commission has always refused to grant any authorisation to evangelical Protestant communities. The Church of the Full Gospel in Tizi Ouzou, which is described as the largest Algerian Protestant church was closed by police in 2019; in March 2023, a court sentenced the president of the Protestant Church of Algeria (EPA), Pastor Salaheddine Chalah, to 18 months in prison for proselytizing on social media, although this was later reduced to non-custodial sentence.

The 2018 report of the Human Rights Commission expressed the committee's concern about the risk of criminalization of non-Muslim activities, the closure of churches and attacks & intimidations against people not practicing Ramadan.

In addition, the Special Rapporteur on Freedom of Religion or Belief together with various other UN Special Rapporteurs sent two communications to the Algerian government. A first letter, dated 4 October 2018, expresses their concern about "the administrative and judicial barriers faced by members of the Christian minority" and the second, dated 2 December 2020, mentions an "administrative closure campaign". Only the second letter was answered, in two parts, in which the Algerian government stated that "the allegations concerning the situation of Protestants in Algeria are false and unfounded".

However, various joint NGO’s and international organization’s statements, including from the world evangelical alliance and the World Council of Churches, have continued to call on the government of Algeria to bring the legal framework on religious minority rights in line with its international obligations on the right to freedom of religion or belief, allow re-opening of all Protestant churches, and overturn convictions of individual Christians.

Protestant denominations in Algeria include:

- Armée du Salut
- Assemblées de Dieu
- Eglise Adventiste du Séptieme Jour
- Eglise Evangélique Copte
- Eglise Protestante d'Algérie
- Frères Larges
- Anglican Diocese of Egypt
- Mission Baptiste Evangélique
- Mission Biblique de Ghardaia
- Mission d'Afrique du Nord
- Mission Evangélique au Sahara
- Mission Evangélique de Médéa
- Mission Evangélique du Sahara
- Mission Rolland

=== Conversions in Kabylie ===
Conversions to Christianity have been most common in Kabylie, especially in the wilaya of Tizi-Ouzou. In Tizi-Ouzou, the proportion of Christians has been estimated to be between 1% and 5% compared to 0.2% for Algeria in general as of 2009. Christians have at times been subjected to religiously motivated attacks. Estimates have varied, from 20,000 to 380,000 Muslims having converted to Christianity in Algeria. However, some Christian organizations have questioned the accuracy of these figures, describing them as overstated; government estimates put the number of conversions in 2007 at approximately 140.

== See also ==
- Religion in Algeria
- Berber Christians
- Protestantism in Algeria
- Catholic Church in Algeria
