= Religion in Algeria =

Religion in Algeria (2022)
1. Islam (99.2%)
2. Christianity (0.30%)
3. Unaffiliated (0.30%)
No answer 0.2%
Would describe yourself as religious, somewhat religious, or not religious?
1. Religious (47.4%)
2. Somewhat religious (40.1%)
3. Not religious (10.0%)
4. Don't know (1.00%)
5. Refused to answer (1.50%)

Religion in Algeria is dominated by Muslims, with nearly ninety-eight of the population (over ninety-nine percent of the population that state any religion) adhering to Sunni Islam of the Maliki school of jurisprudence, as of 2020. The remainder include other Islamic schools and branches (Shias and Ibadis), Christian denominations (Roman Catholics, Seventh-day Adventists, the Protestant Church of Algeria (a federation of Reformed and Methodist groups), Lutherans, Anglicans and Egyptian Copts), Baháʼís and Jews. Estimates of the Christian population range from 71,000 (estimate for 2010) to 200,000 (2018 report). The latest available estimates suggest a Baháʼí population of 3,300 (2010 report), and a Jewish community of less than 200 people.

== History ==
=== Antiquity ===
Traditional Berber religion consisted apparently in sun worship, belief in an afterlife, animism and the idea of holy men (this idea continued in Muslim Algeria and holy men are called marabouts). Religious practice was further influenced by the Phoenicians, Greeks and Romans, who also introduced their own gods or reinterpreted certain indigenous gods as their own. Christianity is first attested in Roman Africa in 180 and produced for some time the Donatist schism before it became a major center for Catholic orthodoxy. St. Augustine of Hippo, one of the most important theologians in Roman Catholicism, was born in Thagaste (Souk Ahras) and taught in Hippo (Annaba).

=== Medieval ===
The Arab conquest of the Maghreb in the latter half of the 7th century and the early 8th century introduced Islam to parts of the area. During the initial stage of the occupation, Berbers would often return to their traditional religion, but the satisfaction of participating in the conquering Arab armies began to win Berber converts to Islam. Tensions between the Arabs and the Berbers remained, however, and many Berbers adopted the egalitarian sect of Kharijism as a means to break away from Arab control. Shiism arrived in the region at the end of the ninth century but disappeared after the Fatimids lost control over the region.

Christianity slowly declined in the meantime until the last native Christians communities disappeared from Béjaïa and Tlemcen in the eleventh century in Algeria. A new chapter for the North African church begun in the thirteenth century when newcomers from Europe took up residence in the larger coastal towns. These included Christian captives, merchants as well as mercenaries hired by local Muslim rulers.

=== Modernity ===
After the French conquest of Algeria in the 19th century, Christianity returned though few Algerians converted and the Church served mostly European settlers. Since the mid-20th-century Algerian War, also called the Algerian Revolution, regimes have sought to develop an Islamic Arab socialist state, and a cabinet-level ministry acts for the government in religious affairs. Although the Boumediene regime consistently sought, to a far greater extent than its predecessor, to increase Islamic awareness and to reduce Western influence, the rights of non-Muslims continued to be respected. The Bendjedid government pursued a similar policy.

== Islam ==
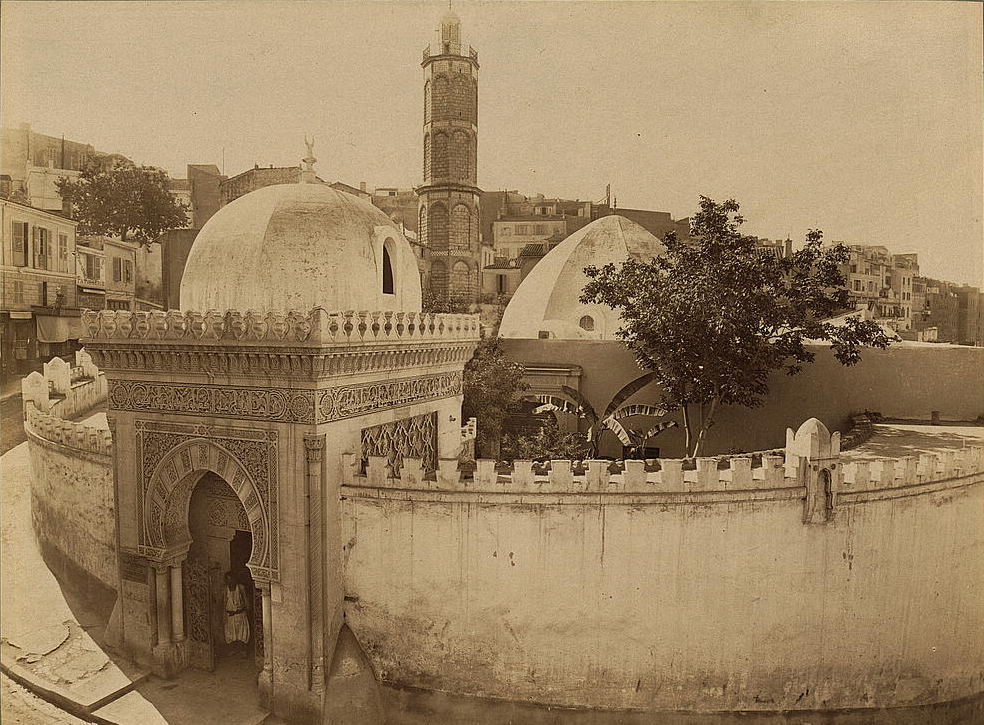
Pasha mosque in Oran

Islam, the religion of almost all of the Algerian people, pervades most aspects of life. It provides the society with its central social and cultural identity and gives most individuals their basic ethical beliefs.

During the 7th century, Muslims reached North Africa, and by the beginning of the 8th century the Berbers had been for the most part converted to Islam. Sunni Islam, the larger of the two great branches of the faith, is the form practiced by the overwhelming majority of Muslims in Algeria, while there is a small Ibadi minority. There is no significant Shia presence.

One of the dominant characteristics of Islam in North Africa was the cult of holy men, or maraboutism, which goes back to the traditional Berber religion. Marabouts were believed to have barakah, or divine grace, as reflected in their ability to perform miracles. Recognized as just and spiritual men, marabouts often had extensive followings, locally and regionally. Muslims believed that baraka could be inherited, or that a marabout could confer it on a follower.

The turuq, meaning way or path, or brotherhoods, were another feature of Islam in the Maghreb from the Middle Ages onward. Each brotherhood had its own prescribed path to salvation, its own rituals, signs, symbols, and mysteries. The brotherhoods were prevalent in the rural and mountainous areas of Algeria and other parts of North Africa. Their leaders were often marabouts or shaykhs. The more orthodox Sunni Muslims dominated the urban centers, where traditionally trained men of religion, the ulema, conducted the religious and legal affairs of the Muslim community.

=== Islam and the Algerian state ===
Jews and Christians, are according to the Qur'an recognized as the precursors of Islam and who were called "people of the book" because of their holy scriptures, were permitted to continue their own communal and religious life as long as they recognized the temporal domain of Muslim authorities, paid their taxes, and did not proselytize or otherwise interfere with the practice of Islam.

Soon after arriving in Algeria, the French colonial regime set about undermining traditional Muslim Algerian culture. The French ideas such as freedom of religion, however, vastly differed from the Islamic way of living. For this reason, Islam was a strong element of the resistance movement to the French.

After independence, the Algerian government asserted state control over religious activities for purposes of national consolidation and political control. Islam became the state religion in the new constitution and the religion of its leaders. No laws could be enacted that would be contrary to Islamic tenets or that would in any way undermine Islamic beliefs and principles. The state monopolized the building of mosques, and the Ministry of Religious Affairs controlled an estimated 5,000 public mosques by the mid-1980s. Imams were trained, appointed, and paid by the state, and the Friday khutba, or sermon, was issued to them by the Ministry of Religious Affairs. That ministry also administered religious property, the habus, provided for religious education and training in schools, and created special institutes for Islamic learning.

Those measures, however, did not satisfy everyone. As early as 1964, a militant Islamic movement, called Al Qiyam (values), emerged and became the precursor of the Islamic Salvation Front of the 1990s. Al Qiyam called for a more dominant role for Islam in Algeria's legal and political systems and opposed what it saw as Western practices in the social and cultural life of Algerians. This proved to be the most difficult challenge for the immediate post-independent regimes as they tried to incorporate an Islamic national identity alongside socialist policies. Whereas the new leaders of Algeria saw Islam and Socialism as both compatible and features of Algerian culture and society; radical Islamists saw Islam as the only defining characteristic and in fact incompatible.

Houari Boumédiène largely contained militant Islamism during his reign, although it remained throughout the 1970s under a different name and with a new organization. Following Boumediene's death, Chadli Bendjedid became president in 1979. Chadli's regime was much more tolerant with Islamists, and with Algeria in the midst of an socio-economic crisis including unemployment and inflation, social tensions were high. Policies of Arabization (increasing Arabic education and the use of Arabic in professional institutions) had failed to come to fruition: French remained the language of the political elite and French speaking students were prioritised for jobs. Thus, the movement began spreading to university campuses, where it was encouraged by the state as a counterbalance to left-wing student movements. By the 1980s, the movement had become even stronger, and in November 1982, bloody clashes erupted at the University of Algiers in Algiers. The violence resulted in the state's cracking down on the movement, a confrontation that would intensify throughout the 1980s and early 1990s (see The Islamist Factor, ch. 4).

The rise of Islamism had a significant impact on Algerian society. More women began wearing the veil, some because they had become more conservative religiously and others because the veil kept them from being harassed on the streets, on campuses, or at work. Islamists also prevented the enactment of a more liberal family code despite pressure from feminist groups and associations.

== Religious minorities ==
=== Christianity ===
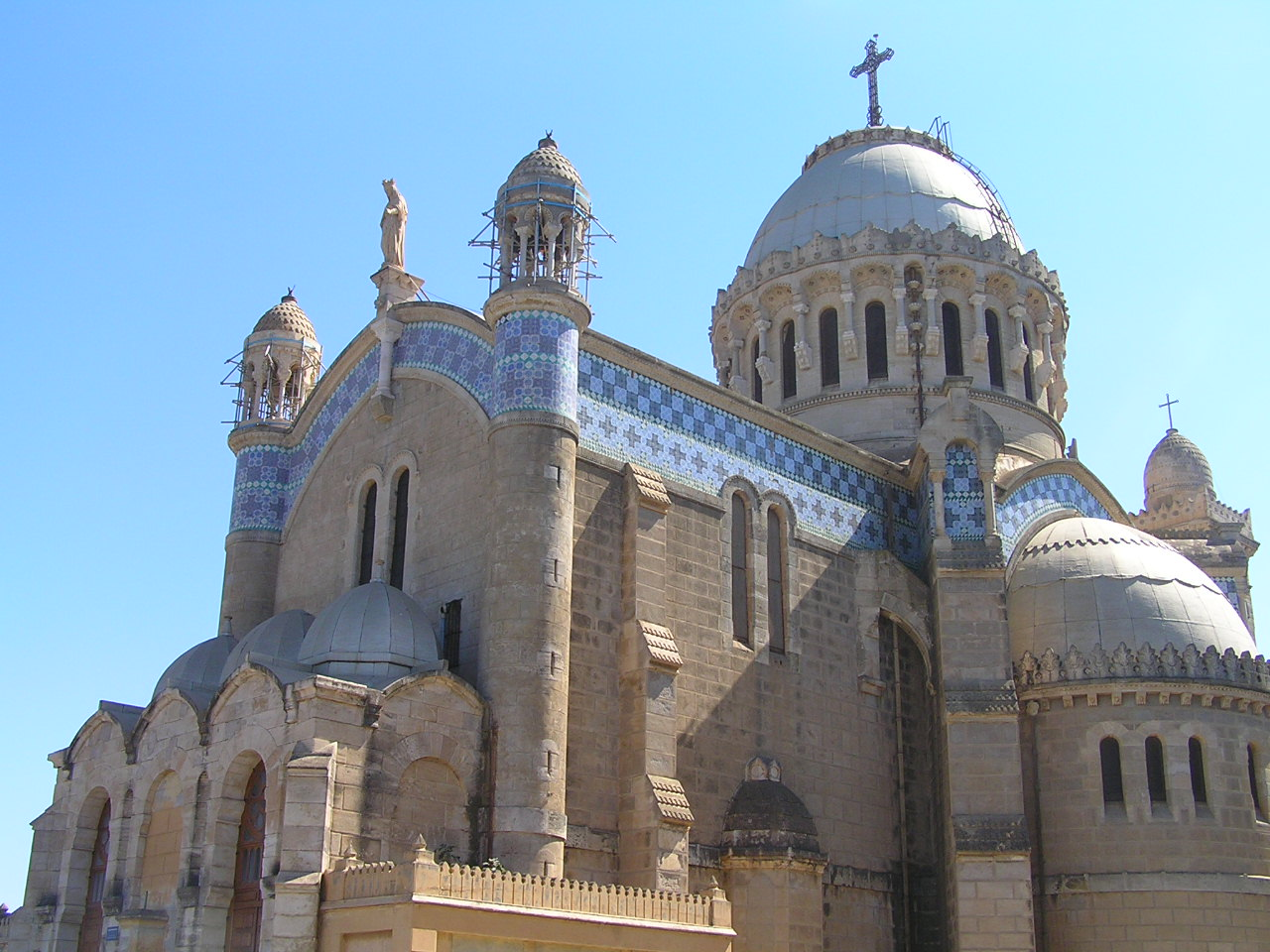
Notre Dame d'Afrique (Our Lady of Africa) is a Roman Catholic church that is the basilica of Algiers

Christianity came to North Africa in the Roman era. Its influence declined during the chaotic period of the Vandal invasions but was strengthened in the succeeding Byzantine period, only to disappear gradually after the Arab invasions of the seventh century.

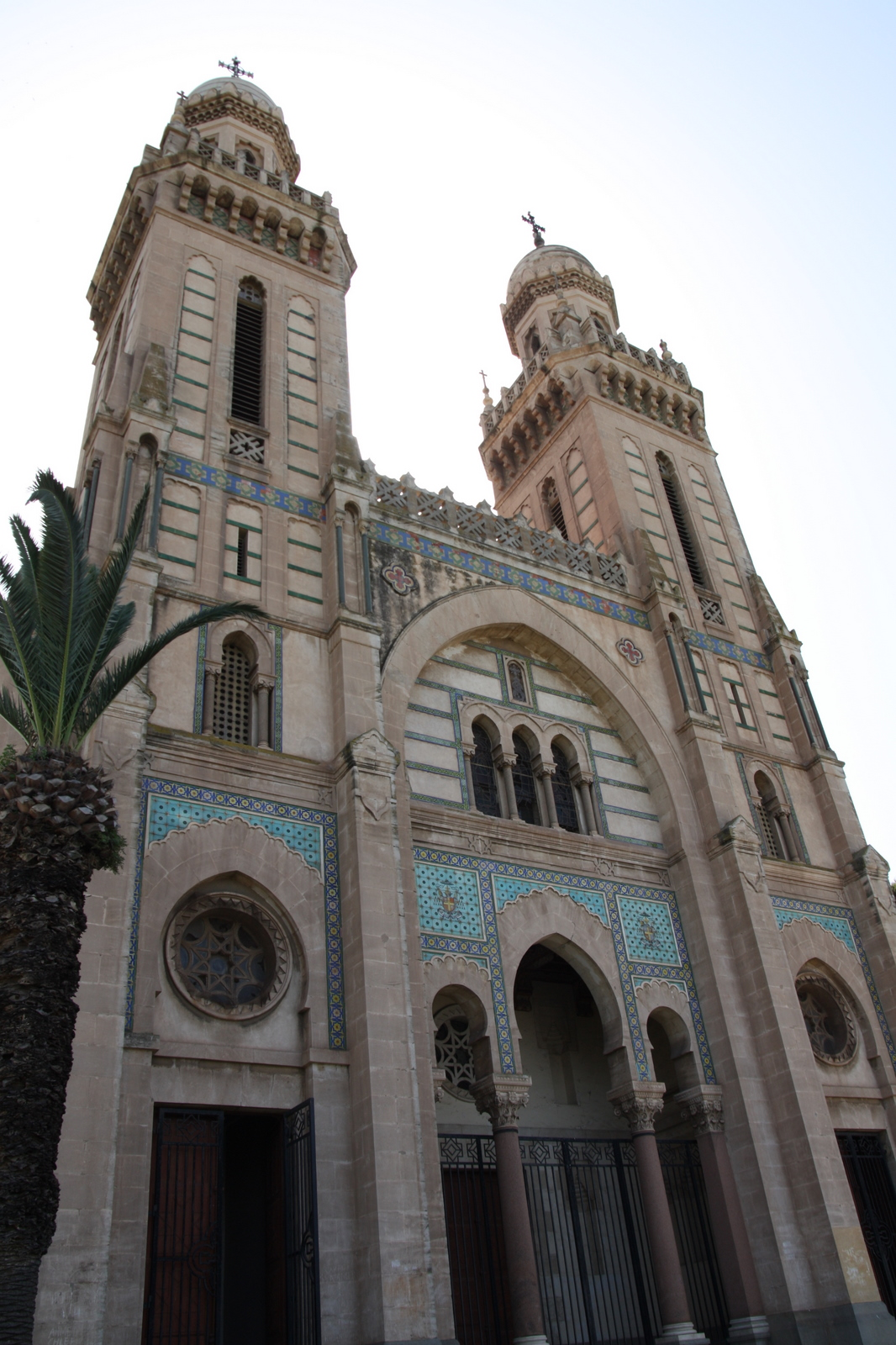
Basilica St.Augustine in Annaba built not far from the remains of his Basilica Pacis

The Roman Catholic Church was reintroduced after the French conquest, when the Diocese of Algiers was established in 1838. Proselytization of the Muslim population was at first strictly prohibited; later the prohibition was less vigorously enforced, but few conversions took place. The several Roman Catholic missions established in Algeria were concerned with charitable and relief work; the establishment of schools, workshops, and infirmaries; and the training of staff for the new establishments. Some of the missionaries of these organizations remained in the country after independence, working among the poorer segments of the population. In the early 1980s, the Roman Catholic population numbered about 45,000, most of whom were foreigners (usually ethnic French) or Algerians who had married French or Italians. In addition, there was a Protestant community. Because the government adopted a policy of not inquiring about religious affiliation in censuses or surveys to avoid provoking religious tensions, the number of Christians in the early 1990s was not known. Algerian Christians reside mostly in the main cities such as Algiers, Béjaïa, Tizi Ouzou, Annaba, and Oran, and the Kabylia region.

The government of Algeria has been known to target the Protestant Church of Algeria (EPA), closing down dozens of churches in three waves since 2008, putting the churches through rigorous processes before allowing then to re-open. This activity included eighteen churches closed between November, 2017 and October, 2019. The United States Commission on International Religious Freedom included Algeria in its 2020 report of the world's most severe religious freedom violators for a number of discriminatory actions, including the fact that, as of the report, 12 EPA churches had not yet been given permission to re-open.

A 2015 study estimates some 380,000 Christian believers from a Muslim background in the country, most of whom subscribe to some form of evangelical Christianity. There is also a small growing Pentecostal and evangelical community.

=== Baháʼí and Judaism ===
The Baháʼí Faith in Algeria dates from 1952. Though the religion achieved some growth and organization through 1967 including converts, the period of the independence of Algeria when the country adopted Islamic practices in rejection of colonial influences and subsequently the religion was effectively banned in 1968. However, by 2010, the Association of Religion Data Archives estimated the population of Baháʼís in Algeria at 3,300 followers.

The Jewish community of Algeria dates back to antiquity, with some members claiming descent from immigrants from Palestine at the time of the Romans. The majority are descendants of refugees from Spanish persecution early in the fifteenth century. They numbered about 140,000 before the Algerian War, but at independence in 1962 nearly all of them left the country. Because the 1870 Crémieux Decrees, which aimed at assimilating the colonists of Algeria to France, gave Jews full French citizenship, most members of the Jewish community emigrated to France. The small remaining Jewish population appeared to have stabilized at roughly 1,000. It was thought to be close to this number in the early 1990s. Although no untoward incidents occurred during the Arab-Israeli wars of 1967 and 1973, a group of youths sacked the only remaining synagogue in Algiers in early 1977.

== Religiosity ==
According to a survey by Arab Barometer for a June 2019 report by BBC News, the percentage of Algerians identifying themselves as non-religious increased from around 8% in 2013 to around 15% in 2018. A follow-up by Arab Barometer, released in December 2019, found that the growth in Algerians identifying themselves as non-religious is driven by young Algerians, with roughly 25% of that specific cohort describing themselves as non-religious.

The Arab Barometer survey in 2018 reported of those that responded: 99.1% of Algerians identified as Muslim, 0.4% as Christian, 0.4% as no faith and 0.1% as Jewish. However, the 2021 Arab Barometer report found that those who said they were not religious among Algerians has decreased, with just 2.6% identifying as non-religious. In that same report, 69.5% of Algerians identified as religious and another 27.8% identifying as somewhat religious. The percentage of young people who identified as not religious decreased from 24% to 17% in the 2021 Arab Barometer survey.

In 2022, Freedom House rated Algeria's religious freedom as 1 out of 4.

In 2023, the country was ranked as the 9th worst place in the world to be a Christian.

== See also ==
- Christianity in Algeria
- Catholic Church in Algeria
- Religious freedom in Algeria
- Ministry of Religious Affairs (Algeria)

== Sources ==
- Entelis, John P. (8 January 2016). Algeria: The Revolution Institutionalized. Routledge. ISBN 978-1-317-36098-8.
- Fyle, C. Magbaily (1999). Introduction to the History of African Civilization: Precolonial Africa. University Press of America. ISBN 978-0-7618-1456-6.
