= Freedom of religion in Algeria =

Freedom of religion in Algeria is regulated by the Algerian Constitution, which declares Islam to be the state religion (Article 2) but also declares that "freedom of creed and opinion is inviolable" (Article 36); it prohibits discrimination, Article 29 states "All citizens are equal before the law. No discrimination shall prevail because of birth, race, sex, opinion or any other personal or social condition or circumstance". In practice, the government generally respects this, with some limited exceptions.

The government follows a de facto policy of tolerance by allowing, in limited instances, the conduct of religious services by non-Muslim faiths in the capital which are open to the public. The small Christian and tiny Jewish populations generally practice their faiths without government interference, although there have been several instances where the Algerian government has closed non-Muslim places of worship, most recently from 2017-2019 during which time eighteen Christian churches have been forcibly shut down. The law does not recognize marriages between Muslim women and non-Muslim men; it does however recognise marriages between Muslim men and non-Muslim women. By law, children follow the religion of their fathers, even if they are born abroad and are citizens of their (non-Muslim) country of birth.

== Within Islam ==
The Government of Algeria appoints imams to mosques and provides general guidance on sermons. However, during the period covered by this report there were reports that adherents replaced government-appointed imams with ones whose views more closely aligned to the sentiments of local practitioners. The Government monitors activities in mosques for possible security-related offenses, bars the use of mosques as public meeting places outside of regular prayer hours, and convokes imams to the Ministry of Religious Affairs for "disciplinary action" when warranted.

Amendments to the Penal Code in 2001 established strict punishments, including fines and prison sentences, for anyone other than a government-designated imam who preaches in a mosque. The Ministry of Religious Affairs coordinated with imams in certain regions to reduce religious extremism following reports that Salafist members called for the boycott of specific prayers, the division of mosques between Salafi and non-Salafi members, and the right to lead religious lessons and hold religious seminars. Harsher punishments were established for any person, including government-designated imams, if such persons act "against the noble nature of the mosque" or act in a manner "likely to offend public cohesion". The amendments do not specify what actions would constitute such acts. By law, the Government is allowed to pre-screen religious sermons before they are delivered publicly. However, in practice the Government generally reviews sermons after the fact. The Government's right of review has not been exercised among non-Islamic faiths.

In 2003, the Government sanctioned a number of imams for inflammatory sermons following the May 21 earthquake and for interpretations of the Qur'an "likely to offend public cohesion". The Ministry of Religious Affairs provides some financial support to mosques and during the period covered by this report sought to expand its control over the training of imams through a government-run Islamic educational institute. At the end of the period covered by this report, no school had actually been established.

== For non-Muslims ==
People without religious affiliation tend to be particularly numerous in Kabylie (a Kabyle-speaking area) where they are generally tolerated and sometimes supported; notably, Matoub Lounes is widely seen as a hero among Kabyles, despite (or because of) his lack of religion. In most other areas of the country, the non-religious tend to be more discreet.

The majority of cases of harassment and security threats against non-Muslims come from the now nearly destroyed Armed Islamic Group, an organization fighting the government who are determined to rid the country of those who do not share their extremist interpretation of Islam. However, a majority of the population subscribes to Islamic precepts of tolerance in religious beliefs. Moderate Islamist religious and political leaders have criticized publicly acts of violence committed in the name of Islam.

Proselytizing to Muslims by non-Muslims is a criminal offence; in 2022, a Protestant pastor was imprisoned for illegally storing religious literature with the aim of proselytizing Muslims.

Many of the "home churches" in which Christians worship are in allowed and known by the Government, although there have been notable incidents of criminal charges for home-based religious practices. Algerian Christians have recently been facing a serious threat to their freedom to worship and suffered clear violations of fundamental freedoms, including the closure of places of worship which continued into 2019. Since November 2017, 17 churches, members of the Protestant Church of Algeria, have been closed by the Algerian authorities, who justify these closures by a lack of authorisation from the National Commission for the exercise of non-Muslim worship. According to the Protestant Church of Algeria, this Commission has always refused to grant any authorisation to evangelical Protestant communities. The Church of the Full Gospel in Tizi Ouzou, which is described as the largest Algerian Protestant church was closed by police in 2019; in March 2023, a court sentenced the president of the Protestant Church of Algeria (EPA), Pastor Salaheddine Chalah, to 18 months in prison for proselytizing on social media, although this was later reduced to non-custodial sentence.

In 2022, the Catholic Church noted that they were able to carry out religious services and prison visits without interference from the authorities.

The United States Commission on International Religious Freedom (USCIRF) added Algeria to its 2019 annual report of the world's most severe religious freedom violators, citing several legal barriers to the free exercise of religion, specific incidents of violence against members of the Protestant Church of Algeria, and the repression experienced by certain minority Muslim sects. The USCIRF report follows reports from the United States Department of State about the religious oppression seen throughout Algeria, and recommends that the Department of State add Algeria to its Special Watchlist.

Eating in public during Ramadan (particularly for people who "look Muslim") is legal but attracts public hostility in most areas, except for some areas of Kabylie; most restaurants close during Ramadan.

"Offending the Prophet," however, is a criminal charge. If indicted, the defendant faces up to five years' imprisonment and a heavy fine (Abdelkarim Siaghi case - May 2011).

In general noncitizens who practice faiths other than Islam enjoy a high level of tolerance within society; however, citizens who renounce Islam generally are ostracized by their families and shunned by their neighbors. The Government generally does not become involved in such disputes. Converts also expose themselves to the risk of attack by radical extremists.

== International Views ==
In 2022, Freedom House rated Algeria religious freedom as 1 out of 4, noting that members of religious minorities, including the Algerian Protestant Church and members of the Amazigh and Ahmadi communities, suffer from state persecution and interference. Religious communities may only gather to worship at state-approved locations.

In 2023, the country was ranked as the 9th worst place in the world to be a Christian.

In recent years USCIRF reported that religious freedom conditions in Algeria had continued to deteriorate and that the government was increasingly enforcing blasphemy laws and restricting worship. In 2022, the U.S. Department of State placed Algeria on its Special Watch List (SWL), following USCIRF’s recommendation.

== See also ==
- Algerian Family Code
- Human rights in Algeria
- Religion in Algeria
