= Protestant Church of Algeria =

Federation of Protestant churches in Algeria

- Logo of the Eglise protestante d'Algérie
- Classification: Protestant
- Orientation: Reformed
- Leader: Mustapha Krim
- Associations: WCC, WEA, MECC, FMEEC, All Africa Conference of Churches, WCRC, WMC
- Region: Algeria
- Headquarters: Algiers
- Origin: 1972
- Merger of: Reformed Church, Methodist Church
- Congregations: 11-14 (see article)
- Members: 100,000-150,000 (see article)
- Ministers: 21
- Other name: Eglise protestante d'Algérie

The Protestant Church of Algeria (EPA French: Eglise protestante d'Algérie) is a federation of Protestant churches from the Reformed and Methodist traditions established in 1972 in Algeria. It is officially recognised by the government of Algeria as the Association of the Protestant Church of Algeria (French: Association de l'Eglise protestante d'Algérie).

While exact numbers are not precise, estimates of members range from 100,000 to 150,000 in about 40 to 50 parishes nationwide, primarily in the northern coastal region of the country.

== History ==
Protestantism has been present in Algeria since the early days of French rule in Algeria. The first synod of the Reformed churches was held in 1843 and the French Methodists began mission work in Béjaïa around 1883. By 1914, American Methodist missionaries were also well established in Algeria. After the traumatic independence of Algeria, many local Christians fled the country and by 1970, mission run schools and properties had been nationalised.

=== Federation ===
In 1972, the French Reformed communities and the Methodist communities in Algeria federated into a single body known as the Protestant Church of Algeria. The EPA was officially recognised by the Algerian authorities in 1974 as representing the Protestant community in the country.

=== De-registration and church closures ===
In 1990, a new law, Ordinance 90–31, was passed in Algeria requiring religious organizations to update their status. The EPA attempted to do so but failed and was subsequently de-registered by the Algerian government, making it an illegal organization. In 2006, Ordinance 06-03 was passed in Algeria to regulate religious places of worship to register with the government in order to operate. This resulted in churches being closed and regular ministry to Christians being curtailed, particularly in Kabylie.

The EPA and other Christian communities in Algeria continued to receive harassment by Algerian government throughout the period with churches being closed and Christians arrested and charged for conversion, proselytization, and blasphemy The closures came in waves, including a wave that lasted from November, 2017 to October, 2019 and resulted in eighteen churches being forcibly closed.

=== Re-legalisation ===
On 18 July 2011, the EPA was granted re-registration by the Algerian government. This has opened the door for formal dialogue between the EPA and the Algerian government on the issues faced by Algerian Christians in the country, including initial discussions on reform and the possible abolition of Ordinance 06–03.

== Affiliations ==
The EPA is affiliated with the following bodies and participates in ecumenical work:

- World Council of Churches
- World Evangelical Alliance
- Middle East Council of Churches
- Fellowship of Middle East Evangelical Churches
- All Africa Conference of Churches
- World Communion of Reformed Churches
- World Methodist Council

== See also ==
- Christianity in Algeria
- Religion in Algeria
