= Algeria–Holy See relations =

- Algeria: Holy See

Diplomatic mission
- Algerian Embassy, Vatican City: Apostolic Nunciature, Algiers

The Algeria–Holy See relations are the diplomatic relations between Algeria and the Holy See, which is sovereign over the Vatican. The Holy See has an Apostolic Nunciature to Algeria.

== Algerian independence ==
Prior to independence, Algeria was home to a million Catholic settlers (10%). During the Algerian War of 1954-1962 the Holy See accepted the occupation of Algeria by the French colonial empire, and did not speak out in favor of Algerian independence despite pleas from the Algerian rebels to mediate. After Algeria became independent most of the French settlers left the country. However, Algeria generally retained close relationships with France, maintained diplomatic ties with the Holy See and allowed Roman Catholic priests to continue ministering to the remaining Catholics in Algeria.

== Official relationship ==
Although Islam is the state religion of Algeria, the Holy See has maintained a comparatively good relationship with the Algerian authorities, with Léon-Étienne Duval being famously recognized as the bishop of Muslims after the departure of French colonists.

The Algerian state has sought to clearly distinguish between the Catholic religion, which is licit in Algeria with limitations to proselytism, and between Evangelical sects, which are officially forbidden and legally repressed by state powers.

== Recent events ==
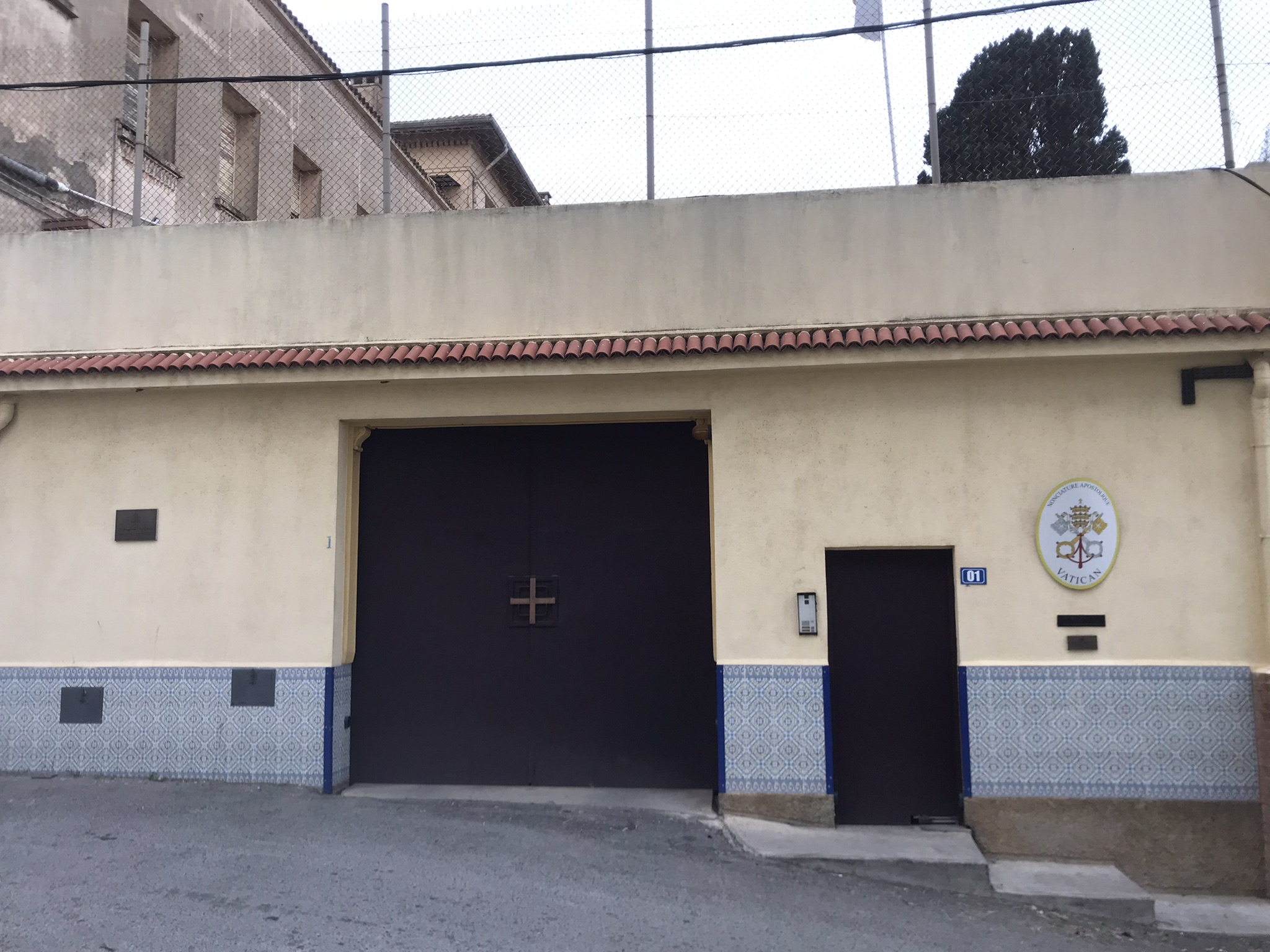
Holy See embassy in Algiers.

In 1996, seven Cistercian monks were killed by Islamist extremists, followed by the death of Roman Catholic bishop Pierre Claverie when a bomb exploded at his residence. The 19 martyrs were beatified in the city of Oran on 8 December 2018, the first such ceremony in a Muslim nation.

On the death of Pope John Paul II in April 2005, the president of Algeria Abdelaziz Bouteflika attended the funeral.

Following remarks by Pope Benedict XVI in Regensberg on 12 September 2006 which were widely interpreted as being offensive to the Muslim religion, the Foreign Affairs minister asked the Vatican's ambassador to provide explanations of these statements. The Algerian Association of Koranic Doctors called on Muslim countries to withdraw their ambassadors from Vatican City in protest.

In March 2017, Pope Francis appointed White Fathers missionary M. Afr. John MacWilliam as bishop of the Roman Catholic Diocese of Laghouat, covering the largely Saharan inland of Algeria. MacWilliaam had risen to the rank of major in the British army through 18 years of service, was ordained a priest in 1991, and joined the White Fathers after the assassination of four of its members in Tizi Ouzou, Algeria. He had become known for his efforts at building bridges with the Muslim community.

On April 13, 2026, Pope Leo XIV arrived in Algiers, marking the first papal visit to Algeria.

== See also ==
- Catholic Church in Algeria
- Foreign relations of the Holy See
- Foreign relations of Algeria
- Religion in Algeria
