= List of Catholic churches in Algeria =

This is a partial list of Catholic churches in Algeria.

== Cathedrals ==
- Cathedral of the Sacred Heart, Algiers
- Cathedral of Our Lady of the Seven Sorrows, Constantine
- St. Mary's Cathedral, Oran
- Pro-Cathedral of Ghardaïa, Ghardaïa

== Basilicas ==
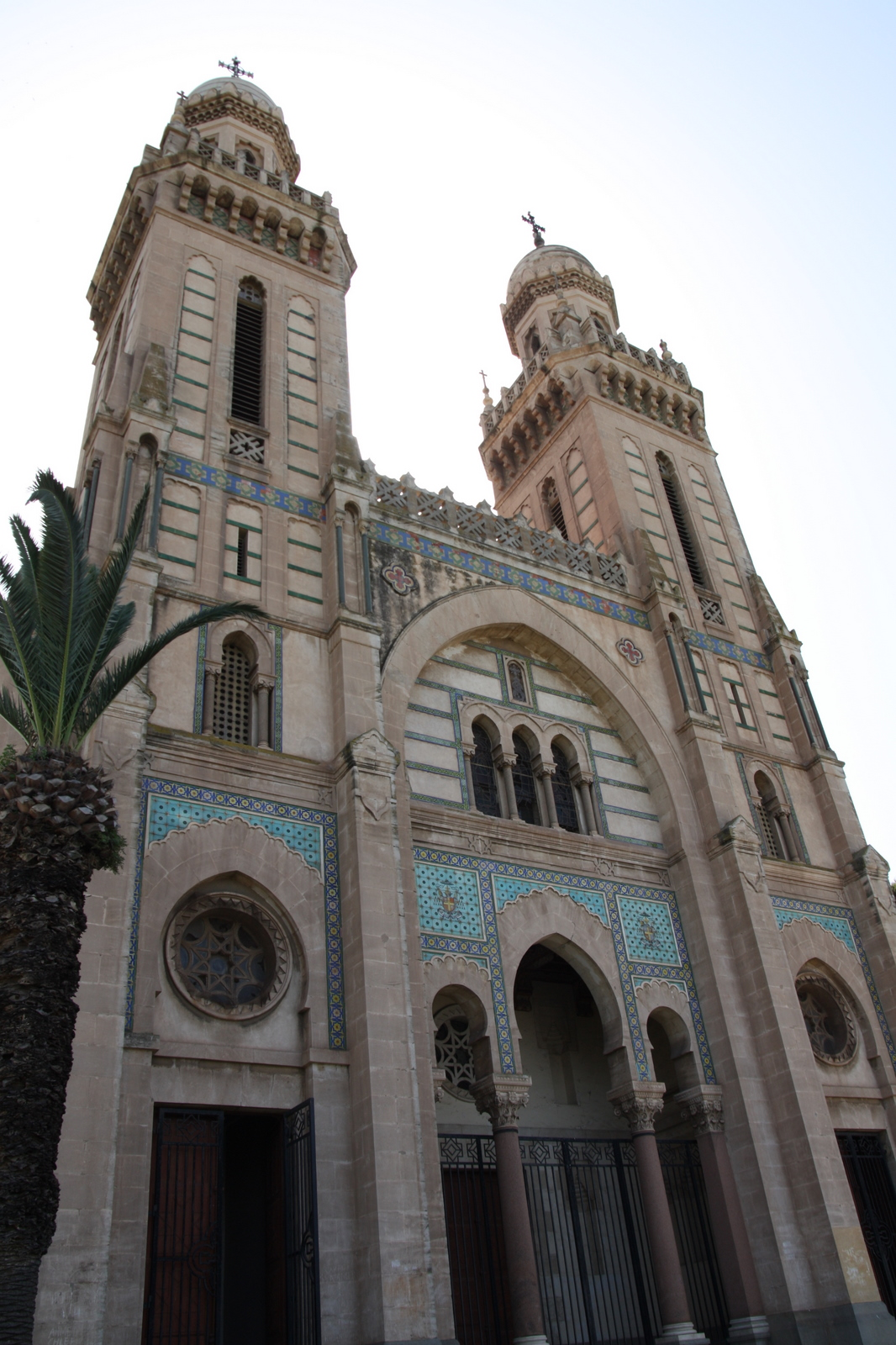
St. Augustine's Basilica contains relics of Augustine of Hippo

- St Augustine's Basilica, Annaba
- Our Lady of Africa, Algiers

== Churches ==
- St. John Church, Oran

== Sanctuaries ==
- Sanctuary of Santa Cruz

== Former churches ==
- Cathedral of the Sacred Heart, Oran (public library)
- Ketchaoua Mosque, Algiers

== See also ==
- Roman Catholicism in Algeria
