= Apostolic Nunciature to Morocco =

Diplomatic post of the Holy See

The Apostolic Nunciature to Morocco is the diplomatic mission of the Holy See to Morocco. The Apostolic Nuncio to Morocco is an ecclesiastical office of the Catholic Church in Morocco, with the rank of an ambassador. The nuncio serves both as the ambassador of the Holy See to the State of Libya and as delegate and point-of-contact between the Catholic hierarchy in Morocco and the pope.

The Vatican established the position of Delegate to Northern Africa in 1965; John Gordon held that post until 19 August 1967. Sante Portalupi succeeded him on 27 September 1967. The delegate's responsibilities were modified as the Holy See developed relationships with countries in the delegate's area of responsibility. Portalupi took on the titles of Pro-Nuncio to Algeria and to Tunisia in 1972. He added the title Pro-Nuncio to Morocco on 5 March 1976.

== List of papal representatives to Morocco ==
Apostolic Delegates to Northern Africa

- John Gordon (27 February 1965 – 14 July 1967)
- Sante Portalupi (27 September 1967 – 5 March 1976)

Apostolic Pro-Nuncios

- Sante Portalupi (5 March 1976 – 15 December 1979)
- Bernard Jacqueline (20 March 1986 – 22 May 1993)

Apostolic Nuncios

- Domenico De Luca (22 May 1993 – 17 July 2003)
- Antonio Sozzo (17 July 2003 – 16 September 2015)
- Vito Rallo (12 December 2015 – 30 June 2023)
- Alfred Xuereb (8 December 2023 – present)
