= Apostolic Nunciature to Tunisia =

Diplomatic mission of the Holy See in Northern Africa

The Apostolic Nunciature to Tunisia is the diplomatic mission of the Holy See to Tunisia. The Apostolic Nuncio to Tunisia is an ecclesiastical office of the Catholic Church in Tunisia, with the rank of an ambassador. The nuncio serves both as the ambassador of the Holy See to the State of Tunisia and as the point-of-contact between the Catholic hierarchy in Tunisia and the pope.

The Vatican established the position of Delegate to Northern Africa in 1965; John Gordon held that post until 19 August 1967. Sante Portalupi succeeded him on 27 September 1967. The delegate's responsibilities were modified as the Holy See developed relationships with countries in the delegate's area of responsibility. Portalupi took on the titles of Apostolic Pro-Nuncio to Algeria on 6 March 1972, and Pro-Nuncio to Tunisia on 22 March 1972.

The title Apostolic Nuncio to Tunisia is held by the prelate appointed Apostolic Nuncio to Algeria; he resides in Algeria.

== List of papal representatives to Tunisia ==
Apostolic Delegates to Northern Africa

- John Gordon (27 February 1965 – 14 July 1967)
- Sante Portalupi (27 September 1967 – 22 March 1972)

Apostolic Pro-Nuncios

- Sante Portalupi (22 March 1972 – 15 December 1979)
- Gabriel Montalvo Higuera (18 March 1980 – 12 June 1986)
- Giovanni De Andrea (22 November 1986 – 26 August 1989)
- Edmond Farhat (26 August 1989 – 26 July 1995)

Apostolic Nuncios

- Antonio Sozzo (5 August 1995 – 23 May 1998)
- Augustine Kasujja (26 May 1998 – 22 April 2004)
- Thomas Yeh Sheng-nan (22 April 2004 – 2015)
- Luciano Russo (14 June 2016 – 22 August 2020)
- Kurian Mathew Vayalunkal (2 February 2021 - 15 March 2025)
- Javier Herrera Corona (16 February 2026 - present)
