= Antonio Sozzo =

Italian prelate of the Catholic Church (born 1942)

His Excellency, The Most Reverend Antonio Sozzo
- Apostolic Nuncio emeritus of Morocco; Titular Archbishop of Concordia
- Appointed: 17 July 2003
- Retired: 16 September 2015
- Predecessor: Domenico De Luca
- Successor: Vito Rallo
- Other post: Titular Archbishop of Concordia
- Previous posts: Apostolic Nuncio of Costa Rica (1998-2003); Apostolic Nuncio of Algeria and Tunisia (1995-1998)

Orders
- Ordination: 28 August 1971
- Consecration: 14 October 1995 by Angelo Sodano, Mario Tagliaferri, and Attilio Nicora

Personal details
- Born: May 9, 1942 (age 84) Paola, Calabria, Italy

Styles of Antonio Sozzo
- Reference style: His Excellency; The Most Reverend
- Spoken style: Your Excellency
- Religious style: Archbishop

Antonio Sozzo (born 9 May 1942) is an Italian prelate of the Catholic Church who worked in the diplomatic service of the Holy See, including for twenty years as apostolic nuncio, before he retired in 2015.

== Biography ==
Antonio Sozzo was born on 9 May 1942 in Paola in Calabria. He was ordained a priest of the Diocese of Verona on August 28, 1971.

== Diplomatic career ==
He entered the diplomatic service of the Holy See on 12 July 1976. He worked in Panama, Uruguay, Nigeria, Chile, Germany, Morocco, and Spain, and in the nunciature in Brussels from 1991 to 1993.

On 5 August 1995, Pope John Paul II appointed him Titular Archbishop of Concordia and Apostolic Nuncio to Algeria and to Tunisia, as well as Apostolic Delegate to Libya.

On 23 May 1998, he was appointed Apostolic Nuncio to Costa Rica.

On 17 July 2003, he was appointed Apostolic Nuncio to Morocco. In 2010, after several Christians, including one Catholic priest, were forced to leave Morocco on short notice after being charged with undermining the faith of Muslims, Sozzo insisted that the Church adhere to Morocco's law against proselytizing. He resigned on 16 September 2015 at the age of 73 and was awarded the Order of Ouissam Alaouite by King Mohammed VI the next day.

== See also ==
- List of heads of the diplomatic missions of the Holy See
