= List of Catholic dioceses in Algeria =

== Current dioceses ==
Ecclesiastical province of Alger

- Metropolitan Archdiocese of Alger; united with the titular see of Iulia Caesarea (Ancient bishopric at Alger)
  - suffragan Diocese of Constantine; united with the titular see of Hippo (Regius) (Ancient bishopric at Constantine)
  - suffragan Diocese of Oran

Exempt

(Immediately subject to the Holy See)

- Diocese of Laghouat

== Source and External links ==
- Official Website of the Catholic Church in Algeria
- GCatholic
- "Catholic Church in Algeria". Catholic-Hierarchy.org. David M. Cheney. Archived from the original on 20 February 2023.

== See also ==
- Catholic Church in Algeria
