= Thomas Yeh Sheng-nan =

Taiwanese prelate

His Excellency, The Most Reverend Thomas Yeh Sheng-nan 葉勝男
- Apostolic Nuncio emeritus to Algeria and Tunisia; Titular Archbishop of Leptis Magna
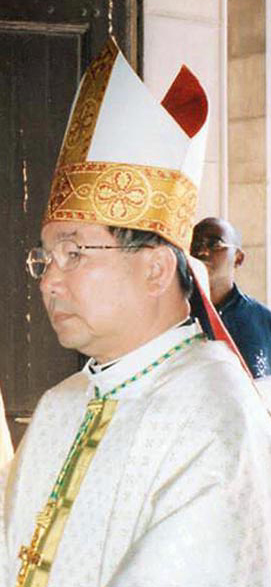
- Bishop Yeh Sheng-nan during the installing of bishop Maroun Lahham in Tunis on 30 October 2005
- Appointed: 22 April 2004
- Retired: 2015
- Predecessor: Augustine Kasujja
- Successor: Luciano Russo
- Other post: Titular Archbishop of Leptis Magna
- Previous post: Apostolic Nuncio to Sri Lanka (1998-2004)

Orders
- Ordination: 27 March 1971
- Consecration: 20 December 1998 by Edward Idris Cassidy, Stanislaus Lo Kuang and Carlo Maria Viganò

Personal details
- Born: Thomas Yeh Sheng-nan; 26 June 1941 (age 84) Takao, Japanese Taiwan
- Denomination: Roman Catholic

Styles of Thomas Yeh Sheng-nan 葉勝男
- Reference style: His Excellency; The Most Reverend
- Spoken style: Your Excellency
- Religious style: Archbishop

Thomas Yeh Sheng-nan (Chinese: 葉勝男; pinyin: Yè Shèngnán; born 26 June 1941) is a Taiwanese prelate of the Roman Catholic Church and diplomat of the Holy See.

== Biography ==
Thomas Yeh Sheng-nan was born on 26 June 1941, in Kaohsiung, Taiwan, and was ordained priest on 27 March 1971, for the Diocese of Tainan. He holds a laurea degree in philosophy.

== Diplomatic career ==
In 1972, he was admitted to the Pontifical Ecclesiastical Academy to study diplomacy.

Yeh entered the diplomatic service of the Holy See on 8 March 1976, and served in the Pontifical diplomatic missions in Nicaragua, Sri Lanka, Zambia, Algeria, Iraq, Australia, Senegal and Great Britain. He was promoted to the counselor of nunciature on 8 March 1989.

On 10 November 1998, he was elected Titular Archbishop of Leptis Magna, and at the same time named Apostolic Nuncio to Sri Lanka. His episcopal consecration took place on 20 December 1998; Cardinal Edward Idris Cassidy was the principal consecrator, with archbishops Stanislaus Lo Kuang and Carlo Maria Viganò, as principal co-consecrators.

On 22 April 2004, Yeh was named Apostolic Nuncio to Algeria and Tunisia. He retired in 2015 and was succeeded in Algeria and Tunisia by Luciano Russo in 2016.

== Gallery ==
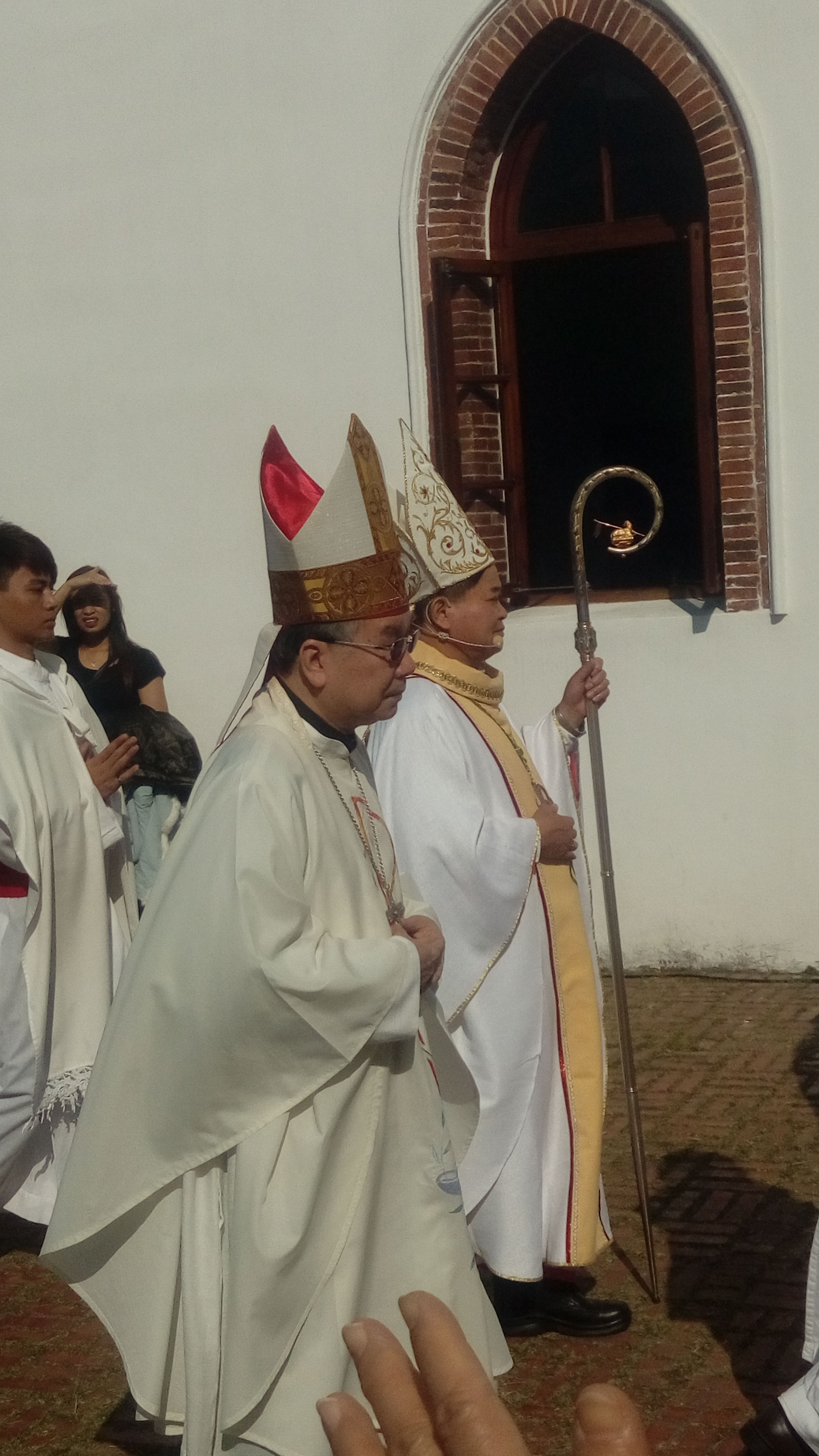
Bishop Yeh Sheng-nan in 2015

== See also ==
- List of heads of the diplomatic missions of the Holy See

Catholic Church titles
Preceded by John Buckley	Titular Archbishop of Leptis Magna; 1998–present	Incumbent
Diplomatic posts
Preceded by Osvaldo Padilla	Apostolic Nuncio to Sri Lanka; 1998–2004	Succeeded by Mario Zenari
Preceded by Augustine Kasujja	Apostolic Nuncio to Algeria; 2004–2015	Succeeded by Luciano Russo
Preceded by Augustine Kasujja	Apostolic Nuncio to Tunisia; 2004–2015	Succeeded by Luciano Russo
