= El Bey Mosque =

Mosque in Constantine City, Constantine Province, Algeria

- مسجد الباي
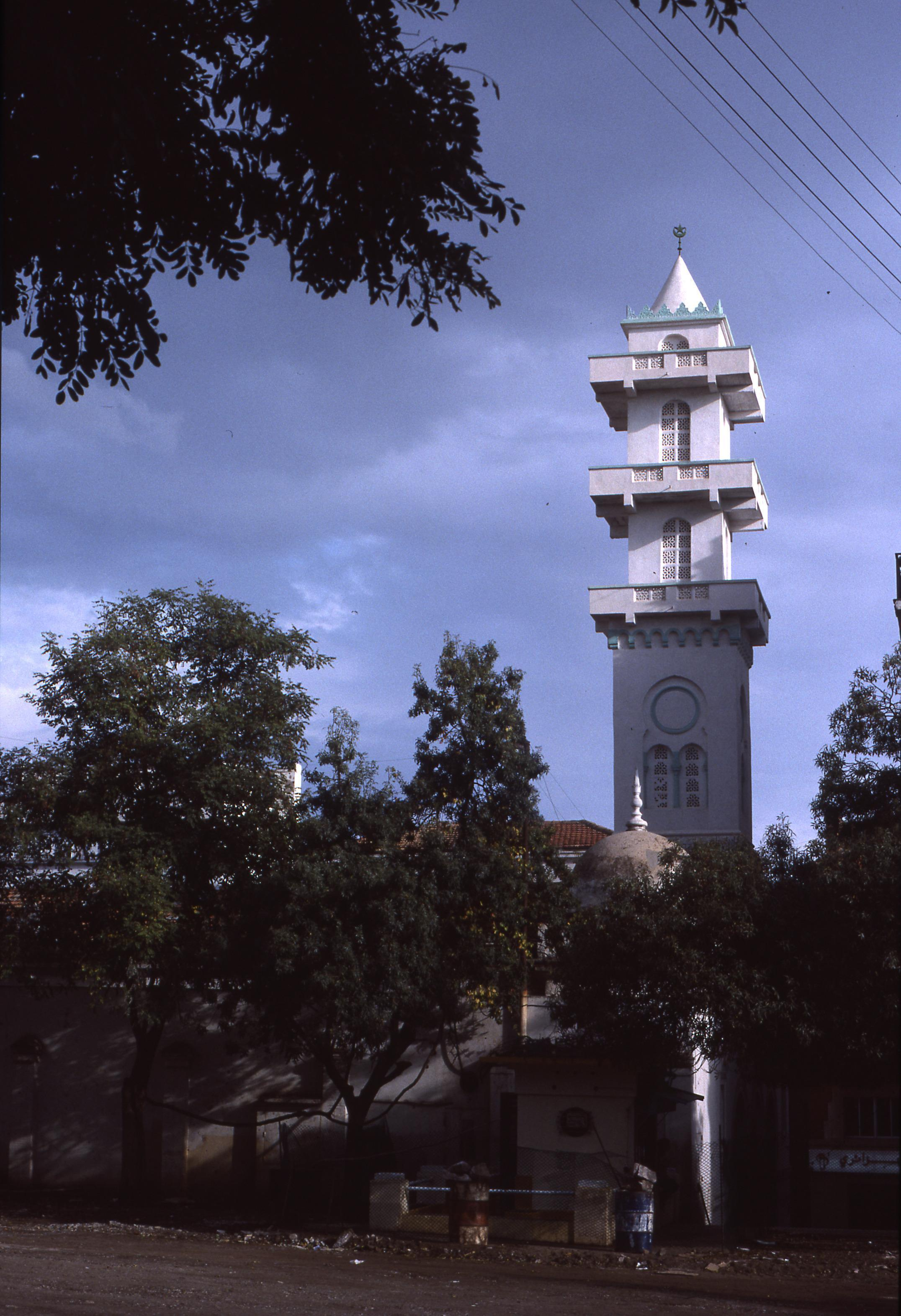
- The mosque in 1950

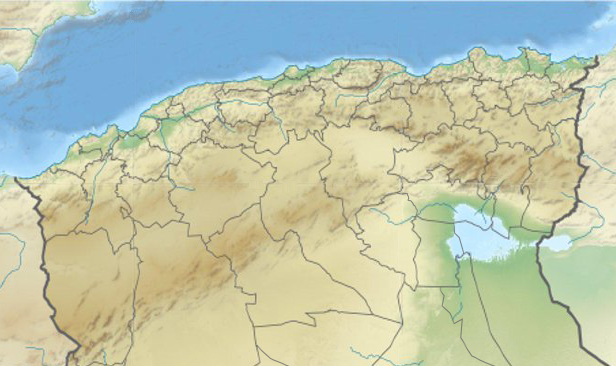
- Location of the mosque in northern Algeria

Religion
- Affiliation: Sunni Islam
- Ecclesiastical or organizational status: Mosque (1730–1838); Cathedral (1838–1962); Mosque (since 1962– )
- Status: Active

Location
- Location: Constantine, Constantine Province
- Country: Algeria
- Interactive map of El Bey Mosque
- Coordinates: 36°22′02.0″N 6°36′42.3″E

Architecture
- Type: Islamic architecture
- Style: Islamic
- Founder: Hussein Bey ibn Muhammad
- Completed: 1730 CE

Specifications
- Capacity: 1,000 worshippers
- Dome: 1
- Minaret: 2

The El Bey Mosque, officially the Hussein Bey Mosque (Arabic: مسجد الباي, romanized: Masjid EL-Bay), founded as the Souk El Ghezel Mosque and also known as the Ghazal Market Mosque, is a mosque located in the city of Constantine, in the Constantine Province of Algeria. Completed as a mosque in 1730 CE, from 1838 until 1962 the building was repurposed as the Cathedral of Our Lady of the Seven Sorrows of Constantine, and restored to its former use as a mosque in 1962.

== History ==
The Hussein Bey Mosque was originally named Souk Al-Ghazal Mosque, which means the 'spinning market mosque'. The name of the mosque dates from the market that was located in the west, where wool was sold, prepared for weaving. The mosque is located between Kerman Street, and Didouche Mourad Street. It is bordered on the north by Shushan Abdel-Baqi Square, on the west by Ahmed Bey Palace, and on the east of Didouche Mourad Street.

It was built during the reign of Hussain Kalyan, known as Abu Kamiya (1713-1736), and it is known today as the Hassan Bey Mosque in honour of its founder, Hussein Bey ibn Muhammad. He is Hussein Bey Boukamiya. He is also called Qalyan Hussein. He was born in 1073 AH (1662/1663 CE), of Turkish origin. His reign was quiet.

The inscription commemorating the construction of the Souk el-Ghazl Mosque is located in the Ahmed Bey Palace, in the northern wall of the bey kiosk, on a white marble plaque of rectangular shape, that is 1.25 by 0.62 metres (4 ft 1 in by 2 ft 0 in), and recorded the history and the founder. French researchers, including Cherbonneau, who obtained a document from Sheikh Mustafa bin Jalul, proved that his grandfather, Abbas, was the one who built the mosque with his money in the neighbourhood of Souk al-Ghazl. The latter agreed, after Abbas' death, and for fear of the bey forgetting his name and immortalising the name of Abbas, erasing the latter's name and replacing it with his own.

In 1838, during the French invasion, the mosque was modified and transformed to a Roman Catholic cathedral called the Cathedral of Our Lady of the Seven Sorrows of Constantine (French: Notre-Dame des Sept-Douleurs, lit. 'The Lady of the Seven Pains'), and served as the seat for the Bishop of Constantine.

In 1962 after Independence, it returned to its original purpose as a mosque, and is currently known as the El Bey Mosque.

== Architecture ==
The facade of doors and entrances, the mosque according to its current form, its general plan is a rectangular shape, merging in part of its northern and western facade with Ahmed Bey Palace and a ground slope. The mosque has two main entrances on the southern side of it, preceded by stone steps. The mosque has modern and original doors. The first was built to support the original doors as a fence, and the second was made of wood with two shutters, called the iron door with latch, and it was a large size that opened from the inside.

The Mosque of Souk al-Ghazl contains knotted windows overlooking the outside, the upper part of which ends with stucco decoration and is surrounded by a stucco frame on the southern side, eleven windows, and on the eastern and western sides there are three arched windows, the dome windows have three windows on each side. The southern side, and the other in the northwest corner.

From the outside, the domes of the mosque are circular in shape and are located on both sides of the minaret located on the western side of the mosque. The second type of domes is known as shallow domes, and it is a dome with a cavity less than the central dome in number.

The prayer house is rectangular, facing transversely over the mihrab. It is adorned with a half-dome of plaster with floral and geometric motifs. The cavity is covered with brightly coloured ceramic squares. On either side are two black and white marble columns on the right of the mihrab. The pulpit is made of wood, and it is 3.45 by 3.45 metres (11.3 by 11.3 ft) long and wide; and 0.96 metres (3 ft 2 in) high. It has eleven degrees, on both sides of it are two feathers adorned with a group of fillings. At the top of the pulpit there is the preacher's session. There are 30 columns, including those built into the wall, all of them resting on circular bases with cylindrical bodies.

== Gallery ==
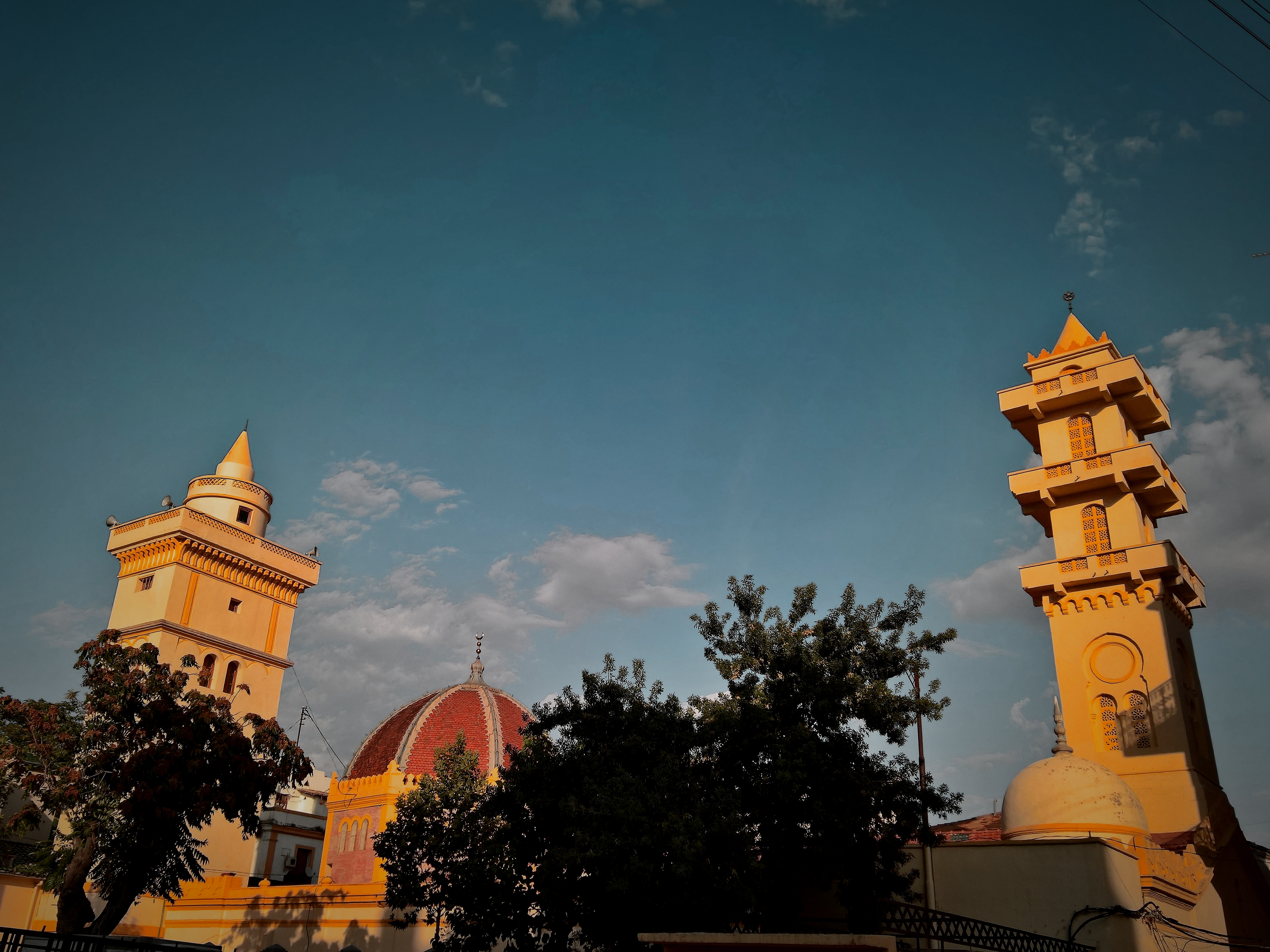
The mosque dome and its minarets, in 2018

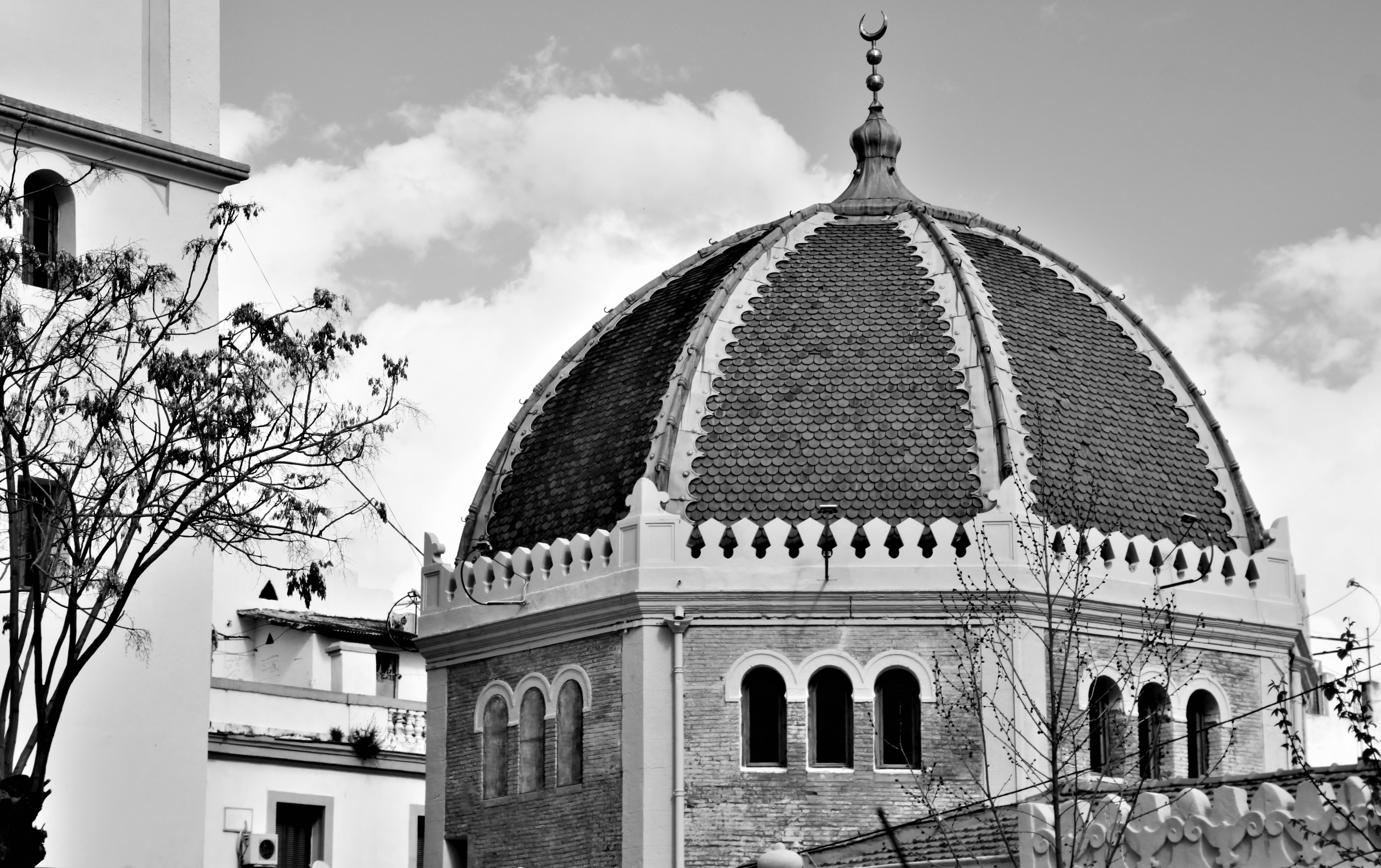
Black and white image of the dome in 2018

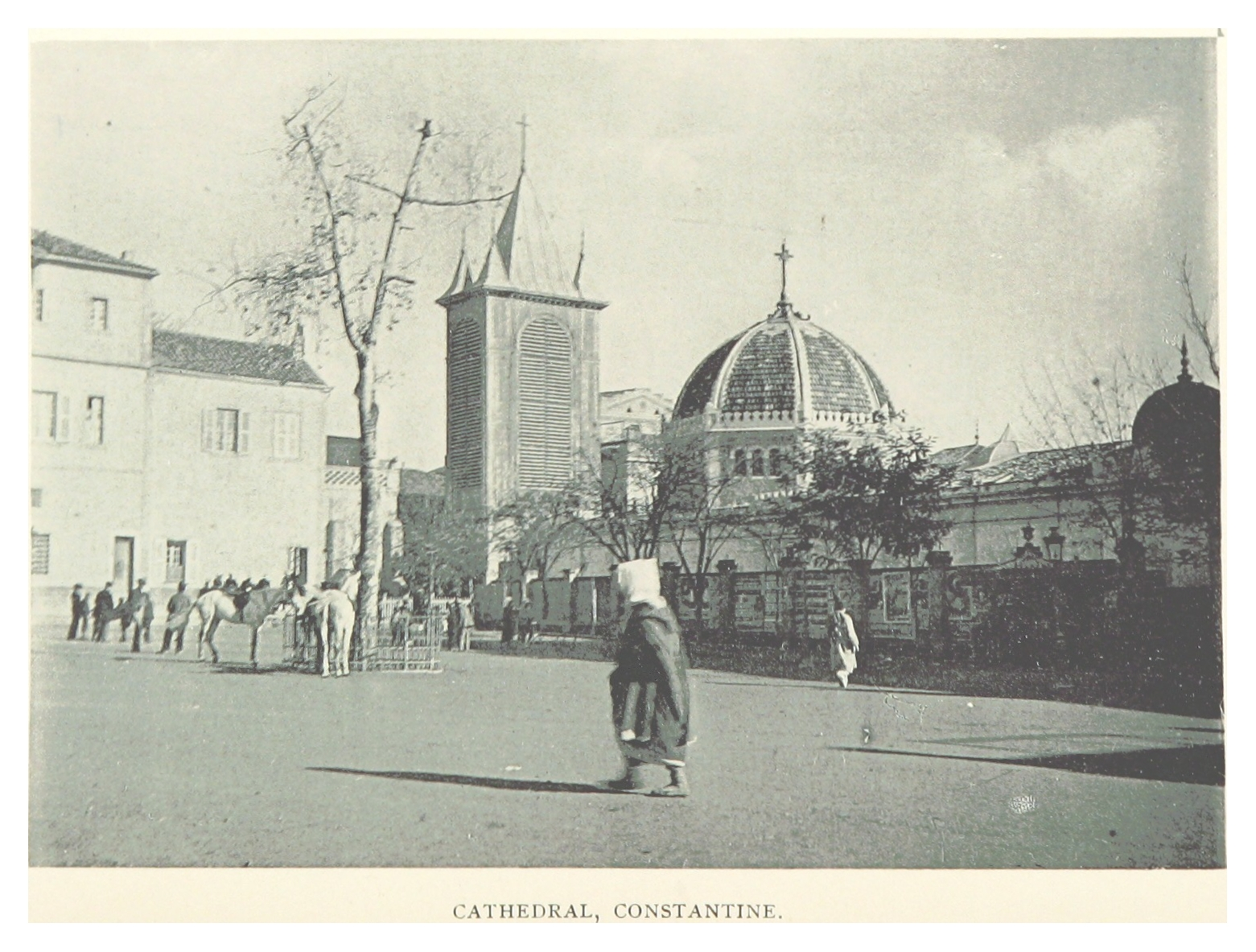
The mosque in 1895, after it was converted to a cathedral

The mosque in 1889

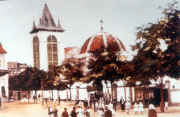
As a cathedral in 1910

== See also ==
- Islam in Algeria
- List of mosques in Algeria
