= Basilica of Saint Augustine =

Basilica of Saint Augustine may refer to:

- Basilica of Saint Augustine (Annaba), a church in Annaba, Algeria, near the ruins of Hippo Regius.
- Cathedral Basilica of St. Augustine, a cathedral in St. Augustine, Florida.
- Basilica of Saint Augustine, a minor basilica in the Camp Martius area of Rome, Italy, the mother church of the Order of Saint Augustine.
