= Pro-Cathedral of Ghardaïa =

Church in Ghardaïa, Algeria

Coordinates: 32°29′18″N 3°40′15″E

Pro-Cathedral of Ghardaïa Pro-cathédrale de Ghardaïa

Religion
- Affiliation: Roman Catholic Church
- Province: Diocese of Laghouat
- Region: Ghardaïa Province
- Rite: Roman
- Ecclesiastical or organisational status: Pro-cathedral
- Status: Active

Location
- Location: Ghardaïa, Algeria
- Interactive map of Pro-Cathedral of Ghardaïa; Pro-cathédrale de Ghardaïa

Architecture
- Type: church
- Style: modern

The Pro-Cathedral of Ghardaïa (French: Pro-cathédrale de Ghardaïa), or simply Cathedral of Ghardaia, is a Roman Catholic church located in the town of Ghardaïa, Ghardaïa Province, Algeria. It succeeded an old Catholic cathedral dedicated to Saint-Hilarion in Laghouat which was secularized.

The pro-cathedral, or temporary cathedral of his jurisdiction, follows the Roman or Latin liturgical rite. It serves as the seat of the Diocese of Laghouat (Dioecesis Laghuatensis), which was established by decision of Pope Pius XII by bull Dum Tantis.

The church is under the pastoral responsibility of Bishop John MacWilliam.

== See also ==
- Cathédrale du Sacré-Cœur d'Alger
- Roman Catholicism in Algeria
