= Portalupi =

Portalupi is an Italian surname that may refer to:

- Ambrogio Portalupi (1943–1987), Italian racing cyclist
- Piero Portalupi (1913–1971), Italian cinematographer
- Sante Portalupi (1909–1984), archbishop and Vatican diplomat
