= Vito Rallo =

Italian prelate of the Catholic Church (born 1953)

His Excellency, The Most Reverend Vito Rallo
- Apostolic Nuncio Emeritus of Morocco; Titular Archbishop of Alba
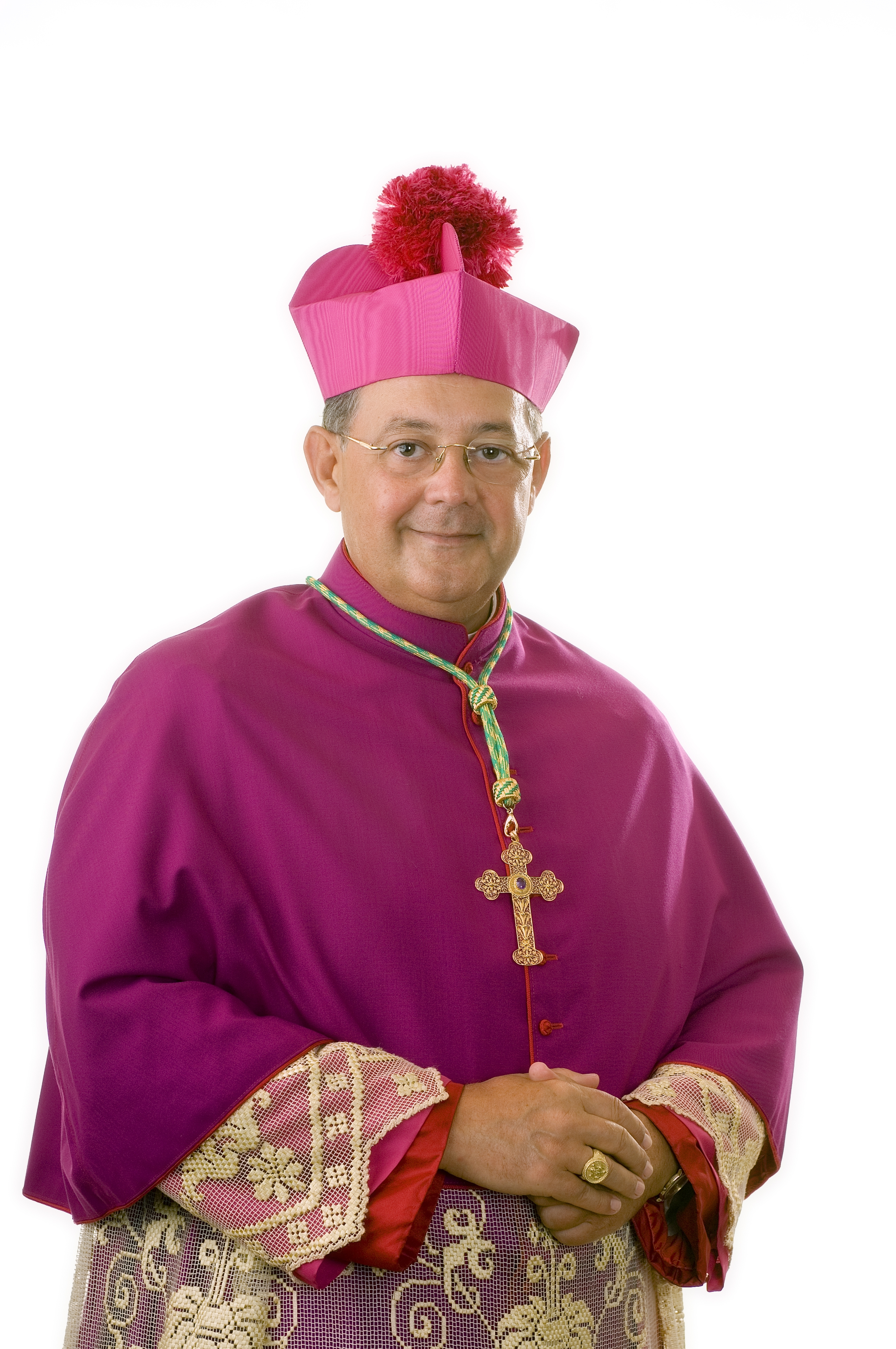
- Archbishop Vito Rallo
- Appointed: 12 December 2015
- Retired: 30 June 2023
- Predecessor: Antonio Sozzo
- Other post: Titular Archbishop of Alba
- Previous posts: Apostolic Nuncio to Morocco (2015-2023); Apostolic Nuncio to Burkina Faso and Niger (2007-2015); Permanent Observer of the Holy See to the Council of Europe (2004-2007)

Orders
- Ordination: 1 April 1979 by Costantino Trapani
- Consecration: 28 October 2007 by Tarcisio Bertone, Domenico Mogavero, and Séraphin François Rouamba

Personal details
- Born: May 30, 1953 (age 73) Mazara del Vallo, Trapani, Italy
- Motto: AD UNITATEM IN CARITATE

Styles of Vito Rallo
- Reference style: His Excellency; The Most Reverend
- Spoken style: Your Excellency
- Religious style: Archbishop

Vito Rallo (born 30 May 1953) is an Italian prelate of the Catholic Church, who worked in the diplomatic service of the Holy See. He served as Apostolic Nuncio to Morocco from 2015 to 2023 and prior to that as Apostolic Nuncio to Burkina Faso from 2007 to 2015.

== Biography ==
Vito Rallo was born in Mazara del Vallo, Trapani, on 30 May 1953. He was ordained a priest of the Diocese of Mazara del Vallo on 1 April 1979. He holds a degree in civil and canon law.

== Diplomatic career ==
In 1986 he entered the Pontifical Ecclesiastical Academy and he joined the diplomatic service of the Holy See on 20 February 1988. His postings took him to Senegal, Mexico, Canada, Lebanon, and Spain.

On 27 January 2004, Pope John Paul II appointed him special envoy and permanent observer of the Holy See to the Council of Europe in Strasbourg, a position he held until 2007.

On 12 June 2007, Pope Benedict XVI appointed him apostolic nuncio to Burkina Faso and Niger and titular archbishop of Alba. On 20 October he received his episcopal consecration in Mazara del Vallo from Cardinal Tarcisio Bertone. He ended his work in those positions in January 2015 "for unexplained health reasons".

On 12 December 2015, Pope Francis appointed him apostolic nuncio to Morocco.

On 30 June 2023, Pope Francis accepted his resignation.

== See also ==
- List of heads of the diplomatic missions of the Holy See
