= Apostolic Nunciature to Algeria =

Diplomatic Mission of the Holy See

Coordinates: 36.80076°N 3.04236°E

The Apostolic Nunciature to Algeria is an ecclesiastical office of the Catholic Church in Algeria. It is a diplomatic post of the Holy See, whose representative is called the Apostolic Nuncio to Algeria and enjoys the rank of an ambassador. The office of the nunciature is located in Bologhine-Alger.

The Vatican established the position of Delegate to Northern Africa on 27 February 1965; John Gordon held that post until 14 July 1967. Sante Portalupi succeeded him on 27 September 1967. The delegate's responsibilities were modified as the Holy See developed relationships with countries in the delegate's area of responsibility. Portalupi took on the title of Apostolic Pro-Nuncio to Algeria on 6 March 1972.

The Apostolic Nuncio to Algeria is usually also the Apostolic Nuncio to Tunisia upon his appointment to said nation.

== List of papal representatives to Algeria ==
Delegate to Northern Africa

- John Gordon (27 February 1965 – 14 July 1967)
- Sante Portalupi (27 September 1967 – 6 March 1972)

Apostolic Pro-Nuncios to Algeria

- Sante Portalupi (6 March 1972 – 15 December 1979)
- Gabriel Montalvo Higuera (18 March 1980 – 12 June 1986)
- Giovanni De Andrea (22 November 1986 – 26 August 1989)
- Edmond Farhat (26 August 1989 – 26 July 1995)

Apostolic Nuncios to Algeria

- Antonio Sozzo (5 August 1995 – 23 May 1998)
- Augustine Kasujja (26 May 1998 – 22 April 2004)
- Thomas Yeh Sheng-nan (22 April 2004 – 2015)
- Luciano Russo (14 June 2016 – 22 August 2020)
- Kurian Mathew Vayalunkal (1 January 2021 – 15 March 2025)
- Javier Herrera Corona (22 November 2025 – present)

== See also ==
- Foreign relations of the Holy See
- List of diplomatic missions of the Holy See
- Roman Catholicism in Algeria
