= Luciano Russo =

Italian prelate of the Catholic Church (born 1963)

His Excellency, The Most Reverend Luciano Russo
- Secretary for Pontifical Representations of Secretariat of State; Titular Archbishop of Monteverde
- Appointed: 10 September 2022
- Other post: Titular Archbishop of Monteverde
- Previous posts: Apostolic Nuncio to Uruguay (2021-2022); Apostolic Nuncio to Panama (2020-2021); Apostolic Nuncio to Algeria and Tunisia (2016-2020); Apostolic Nuncio to Rwanda (2012-2016)

Orders
- Ordination: 1 October 1988 by Bishop João (Giovanni) Gazza, S.X.
- Consecration: 14 April 2012 by Tarcisio Bertone, Giovanni Angelo Becciu and Angelo Spinillo

Personal details
- Born: 23 June 1963 (age 63) Lusciano Italy

Styles of Luciano Russo
- Reference style: His Excellency; The Most Reverend
- Spoken style: Your Excellency
- Religious style: Archbishop

Luciano Russo is an Italian prelate of the Catholic Church who works in the diplomatic service of the Holy See.

== Biography ==
Russo was born in Lusciano, Italy, on 23 June 1963. He was ordained priest of the Diocese of Aversa on 1 October 1988.

He entered the diplomatic service of the Holy See on 1 July 1993 and filled assignments in Papua New Guinea, Syria, Brazil, the Netherlands, the United States, Honduras and Bulgaria.

On 27 January 2012 Pope Benedict XVI appointed him Titular Archbishop of Monteverde and on 16 February named him Apostolic Nuncio to Rwanda. He received his episcopal consecration in Caserta on 14 April 2012 from Cardinal Tarcisio Bertone.

Pope Francis named him Apostolic Nuncio to Algeria and Tunisia on 14 June 2016. Pope Francis named him Apostolic Nuncio to Panama on 22 August 2020.

Pope Francis named him Apostolic Nuncio to Uruguay on 18 December 2021.

Pope Francis named him Secretary for Pontifical Representations of Secretariat of State on 10 September 2022.

== See also ==
- List of heads of the diplomatic missions of the Holy See
