= Ludovic-Henri-Marie-Ixile Julien-Laferrière =

Roman Catholic bishop

- Bishop of Constantine
- Church: Catholic Church
- Diocese: Diocese of Constantine
- In office: 18 May 1894 – 12 August 1896
- Predecessor: Clément Combes
- Successor: Jules-Étienne Gazaniol

Orders
- Ordination: 11 April 1868
- Consecration: 25 July 1894 by Edwin Bonnefoy

Personal details
- Born: 7 September 1838 Paris, Kingdom of France
- Died: 12 August 1896 (aged 57) Paris, France
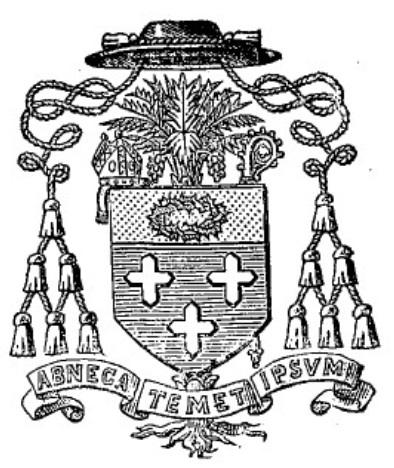
- Coat of arms

Ludovic-Henri-Marie-Ixile Julien-Laferrière (born 7 September 1838 in Paris – 12 August 1896) was a French clergyman and bishop for the Roman Catholic Diocese of Constantine. He became ordained in 1868. He was appointed bishop in 1894. He died on 12 August 1896, at the age of 58.
