= Javier Herrera Corona =

Mexican priest and diplomat (b. 1968)

His Excellency, The Most Reverend Javier Herrera Corona
- Apostolic Nuncio to Algeria and Tunisia; Titular Archbishop of Vulturaria
- Appointed: 22 November 2025
- Predecessor: Kurian Mathew Vayalunkal
- Other post: Titular Archbishop of Vulturaria
- Previous post: Apostolic Nuncio to Republic of the Congo and Gabon (2022-2025)

Orders
- Ordination: 21 September 1993 by Lázaro Pérez Jiménez
- Consecration: 23 April 2022 by Pietro Parolin, Francisco Robles Ortega, and Rafael Sandoval Sandoval

Personal details
- Born: 15 May 1968 (age 58) Autlán, Jalisco, Mexico
- Motto: Ecce ego sum mitte me (Here I am send me)
- Coat of arms

Styles of Javier Herrera Corona
- Reference style: His Excellency; The Most Reverend
- Spoken style: Your Excellency
- Religious style: Archbishop

Javier Herrera Corona (born 15 May 1968) is a Mexican prelate of the Catholic Church who works in the diplomatic service of the Holy See.

== Biography ==
Javier Herrera Corona was born on 15 May 1968 in Autlán, Mexico. He was ordained a priest for the Diocese of Autlán on 21 September 1993.

== Diplomatic career ==
He entered the diplomatic service of the Holy See on 1 July 2003 and served in the pontifical representations in Pakistan, Peru, Kenya, Great Britain, and the Philippines and as an unofficial representative in Hong Kong.

On 5 February 2022, Pope Francis appointed him Titular Archbishop of Vulturaria and Apostolic Nuncio to the Republic of the Congo and Gabon. On 23 April 2022, he was consecrated as an archbishop.

On 22 November 2025, Pope Leo XIV appointed him nuncio to Algeria.

On 16 February 2026, he was given the additional responsibilities for Tunisia.

== See also ==
- List of heads of the diplomatic missions of the Holy See
