= Monteverde, Campania =

Monteverde
- Comune
- Comune di Monteverde
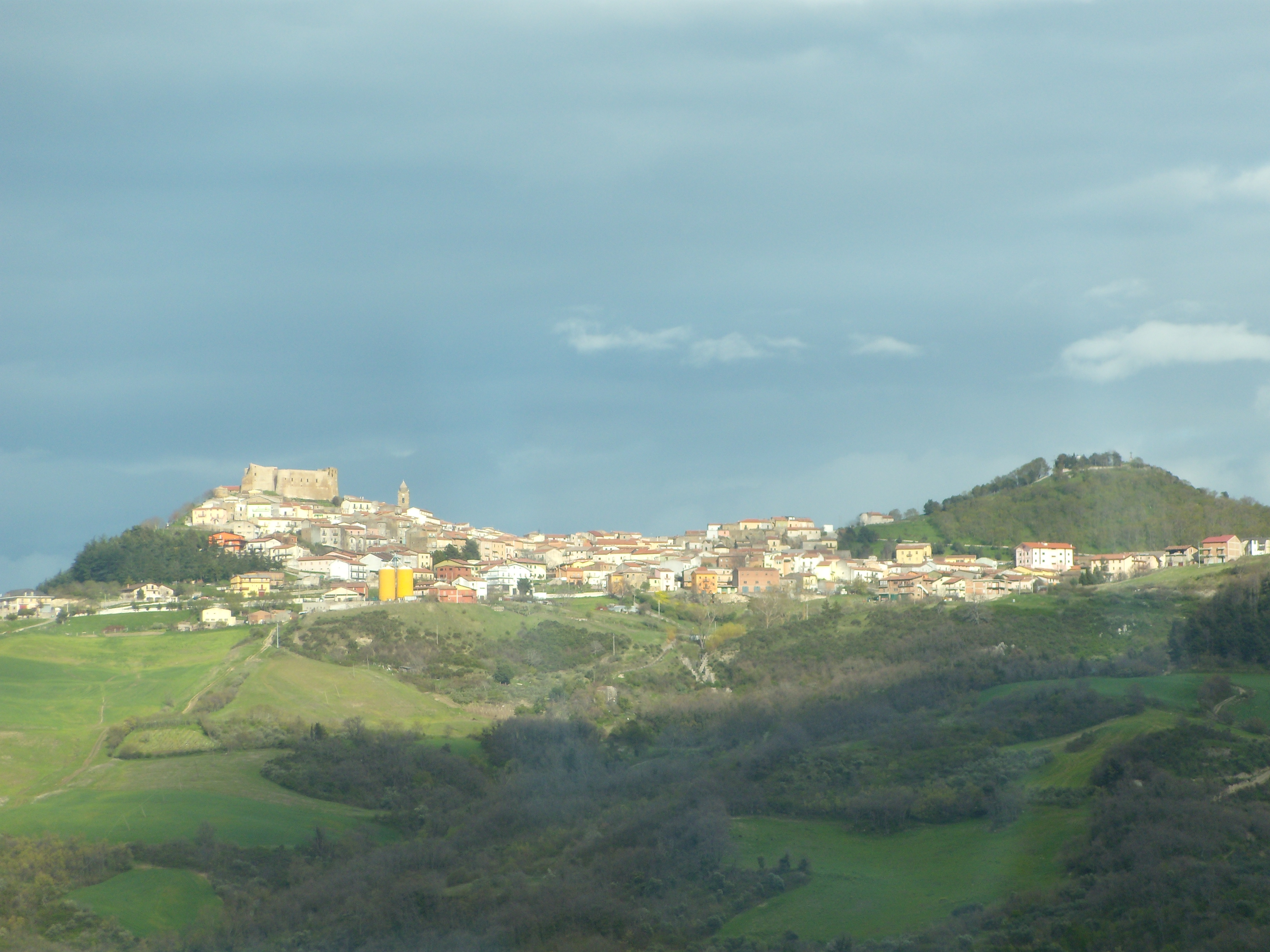

- Coat of arms

- Location within Italy Location within Campania
- Coordinates: 40°59′59″N 15°32′6″E
- Country: Italy
- Region: Campania
- Province: Avellino (AV)

Government
  - Mayor: Francesco Ricciardi

Area
  - Total: 39 km^{2} (15 sq mi)
- Elevation: 740 m (2,430 ft)

Population (30 November 2017)
  - Total: 773
  - Density: 20/km^{2} (51/sq mi)
- Demonym: Monteverdesi
- Time zone: UTC+1 (CET)
  - Summer (DST): UTC+2 (CEST)
- Postal code: 83049
- Dialing code: 0827
- Patron saint: St. Catherine of Alexandria
- Saint day: 25 November
- Website: Official website

Monteverde is a comune in the province of Avellino in Southern Italy. It is one of I Borghi più belli d'Italia ("The most beautiful villages of Italy").

== History ==
In the 11th century, Monteverde became a bishopric seat and had a bishop until 1531, when the diocese of Monteverde was merged with the diocese of Canne. From 1532 to 1641, it was a baronial seigniory, held by a branch of the Grimaldi family. The diocese was eventually cancelled in 1818.
