= Catholic Church in Algeria =

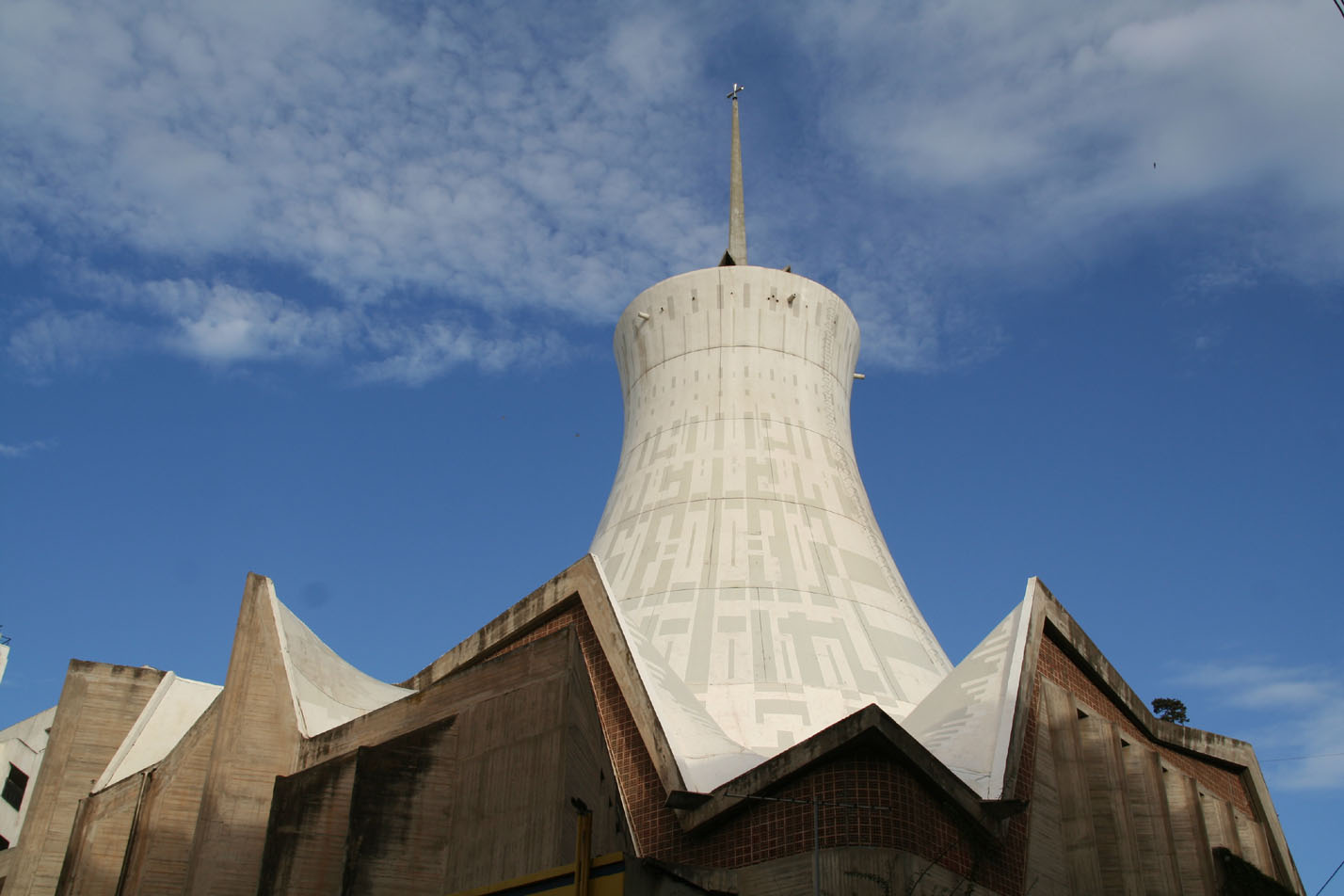
- Cathédrale du Sacré-Cœur d'Alger
- Type: National polity
- Classification: Catholic Church
- Orientation: Latin Church
- Pope: Leo XIV
- Apostolic Nuncio: Javier Herrera Corona
- Region: Algeria
- Headquarters: Algiers
- Origin: 2nd century AD
- Members: ca. 8,000 (2020)
- Priests: 62
- Official website: Eglise Catholique Algerie

The Catholic Church in Algeria is part of the worldwide Catholic Church, under the spiritual leadership of the pope in Rome. Prior to independence, the European Catholic settlers had historic legacy and powerful presence, but today Catholics constitute only a small minority.

== History ==
=== Antiquity ===
Christianity was introduced to Algeria around the 2nd century AD. The popularity of Christianity after the edict of Milan is nowhere else as visible as in North Africa where many huge baptistries were built to facilitate the spread of the religion in the fourth century. At the same time, the Donatist heresy spread in Roman Africa, also enticing many who had grievances with the Roman state, until it was condemned by a commission in 313 AD. Nevertheless, Donatism persisted until the beginning of the fifth century when Augustine of Hippo turned the tide in favour of the Church of Rome.

When the Vandals conquered North Africa in the fifth century, their ruler Gaiseric began a full-scale persecution of Catholic Romans and Africans, banning all Catholic worship, seizing Catholic churches and targeting especially Catholic bishops, priests and deacons. While many were murdered or tortured, also lay people were massacred. After the reconquest by the Eastern Roman Empire, the Catholic faith was reintroduced. By the mid-seventh century, the majority of North Africa's population had been Christian for a long time, though it was far from homogenous and some remote autochthonous tribes remained pagan. The majority of Christians in the cities and towns was Catholic as were most bishops and clergy. Few Monotheletes existed and in 646 metropolitans in Mauretania, Numidia and Byzaca reportedly held synods which rejected Monotheletic doctrine and reported it to Pope Theodore I.

=== Medieval period ===
After the Muslim conquest of North Africa, indigenous Christian communities did not vanish immediately but disappeared in the eleventh and twelfth as part of a long and slow process. This growing weakness can be seen in the greater need of the North African church to look to Rome for help, especially as the shrinking communities and clergy meant that fewer bishops could settle disputes or consecrate new clergy. As such, Pope Gregory VII corresponded in 1076 both with the Catholic community of Bougie as well as with its ruler, Emir al-Nasir, who had written to Gregory, presenting him with gifts and asking him to ordain a certain Servandus as bishop.

A new chapter for the North African church begun in the thirteenth century when newcomers from Europe took up residence in the larger coastal towns. These included Christian captives, merchants as well as mercenaries hired by local Muslim rulers. In order to provide for their spiritual needs and administer rites, various orders such as the Trinitarians, Dominicans and Franciscans sent missions to North Africa with the aid of the popes.

=== Colonial period ===
A new era begun for the Church with the arrival of French forces in 1830, in which many settlers from France, Spain, Italy and Malta came to Algeria. After some early conflict about the application of the concordat between France and the Holy See and the right to appoint priests to Algeria, a papal bull announcing the creation of the diocese of Algiers resolved these issues tentatively in 1838. The new diocese was dependent on the Archdiocese of Aix-en-Provence and was under the authority of the concordate. The first bishop, Antoine-Adolphe Dupuch, arrived in Algiers with the relics of St. Augustine for which he commissioned a basilica to be built in the ruins of Hippo.

Cardinal Lavigerie founded the White Fathers in an effort to spread Christianity among the Muslims while intending to understand and respect the native culture. Charles de Foucauld, a hermit whose life and teaching inspired the foundation of many spiritual congregations, also encouraged the respect for the native religion and culture.

Prior to independence, Algeria was home to a million Catholic settlers (10%) who had a historic legacy and powerful presence. Some Algerians of Berber (mostly Kabyle) or Arab descent converted to Christianity during the French colonialism.

=== After Algerian independence ===
Since independence in 1962, the European Catholic population has decreased substantially, and many Catholics left to France or Spain. According to archbishop Teissier, the Church underwent three stages of death: in the first, directly after independence, the vast majority of Christians left; the second took place in 1993 when all foreigners were ordered out of the country under threat of the G.I.A.; and the third took place during the Algerian civil war when, after the assassination of the 19 martyrs of Algeria, by 1999 only a few thousand Christians remained in the country.

Shortly after independence, some 900,000 European settlers departed, together with most of the native Christians of Algerian and Muslim origin. After a series of violence events over 1962 more than 80% of Catholic settlers left the country. In the following years, the Church handed over 700 churches (which subsequently became mosques) and in 1976, the Church had to also hand over schools, hospitals and other social services as part of a nationalization program. After 1993, the assassination of foreign workers and the closure of all foreign schools meant that almost all Christian families left, including European spouses of Algerians, Coptic coopérants (Christian aid workers) and more native Algerian Christians. After the emigration and violence only about three thousand Catholics remained.

=== 21st century ===
In 2020, Catholics made up 0.01–0.02% of the country's population; there were 62 priests and 116 nuns serving across 30 parishes.

In 2022, the Catholic Church noted that they were able to carry out religious services and prison visits without interference from the authorities.

In April 2026, Pope Leo XIV became the first pope to visit Algeria.

=== International attention ahead of the 2026 papal visit ===
The announcement of Pope Leo XIV's visit to Algeria in April 2026 — the first papal visit to the country — drew significant international attention to the situation of Algeria's Christian minority. Ahead of the visit, advocacy organizations brought the issue before the United Nations Human Rights Council in Geneva.

On March 18, 2026, the European Centre for Law and Justice, in collaboration with Jubilee Campaign and Christian Solidarity International, organized a side event conference at the Council's 61st session dedicated to the treatment of Christians in Algeria. The event heard testimony from Pastor Youssef Ourahmane, vice president of the Protestant Church of Algeria, whose denomination had seen 47 of its churches closed by the state, as well as from Djamila Marie Djelloul, a convert from Islam, and Ali Ait Djoudi, president of Riposte Internationale. Nicolas Bay, a member of the European Parliament, and Charlotte Touati, a historian and affiliated researcher at the University of Lausanne, also addressed the session.

The conference highlighted several areas of concern. Algeria's 2020 constitution removed any explicit reference to freedom of conscience, with only the country's Islamic identity given constitutional recognition. A 2006 ordinance governing non-Muslim worship and a 2012 law on religious associations have made the legal opening of new churches practically impossible, with authorities closing places of worship on administrative or technical grounds. The distribution of Bibles is subject to administrative control, and proselytism carries criminal penalties. The ECLJ simultaneously published a dedicated report on the treatment of Christians in Algeria.

Constance Avenel, Advocacy Officer for Freedom of Religion at the ECLJ, noted that the closure of Caritas Algeria in October 2022 — which had served all Algerians regardless of faith — extended the pattern of restriction to Catholic humanitarian work. She described Christian communities as operating in a "precarious legal grey area," subject to self-censorship and social pressure, particularly with regard to converts from Islam.

Joel Veldkamp, advocacy director of Christian Solidarity International, told EWTN News that Algeria's strategic position — as a major energy supplier for Europe, a counterterrorism partner for the United States, and a significant arms buyer from Russia — had shielded it from sustained international pressure on religious freedom. He nonetheless argued that the scale of the Christian community was so small that its suppression could not plausibly be justified on security grounds.

Recommendations from the UN conference called on Algeria to restore freedom of conscience to its constitution, permit the legal functioning of Protestant churches, revise criminal provisions on proselytism, allow Caritas to resume operations, and engage with a visit from the UN special rapporteur on freedom of religion or belief.

Pope Leo XIV visited Algeria from April 13 to 15, 2026. The visit also coincided with the 30th anniversary of the martyrdom of the monks of Tibhirine.

== Jurisdictions ==
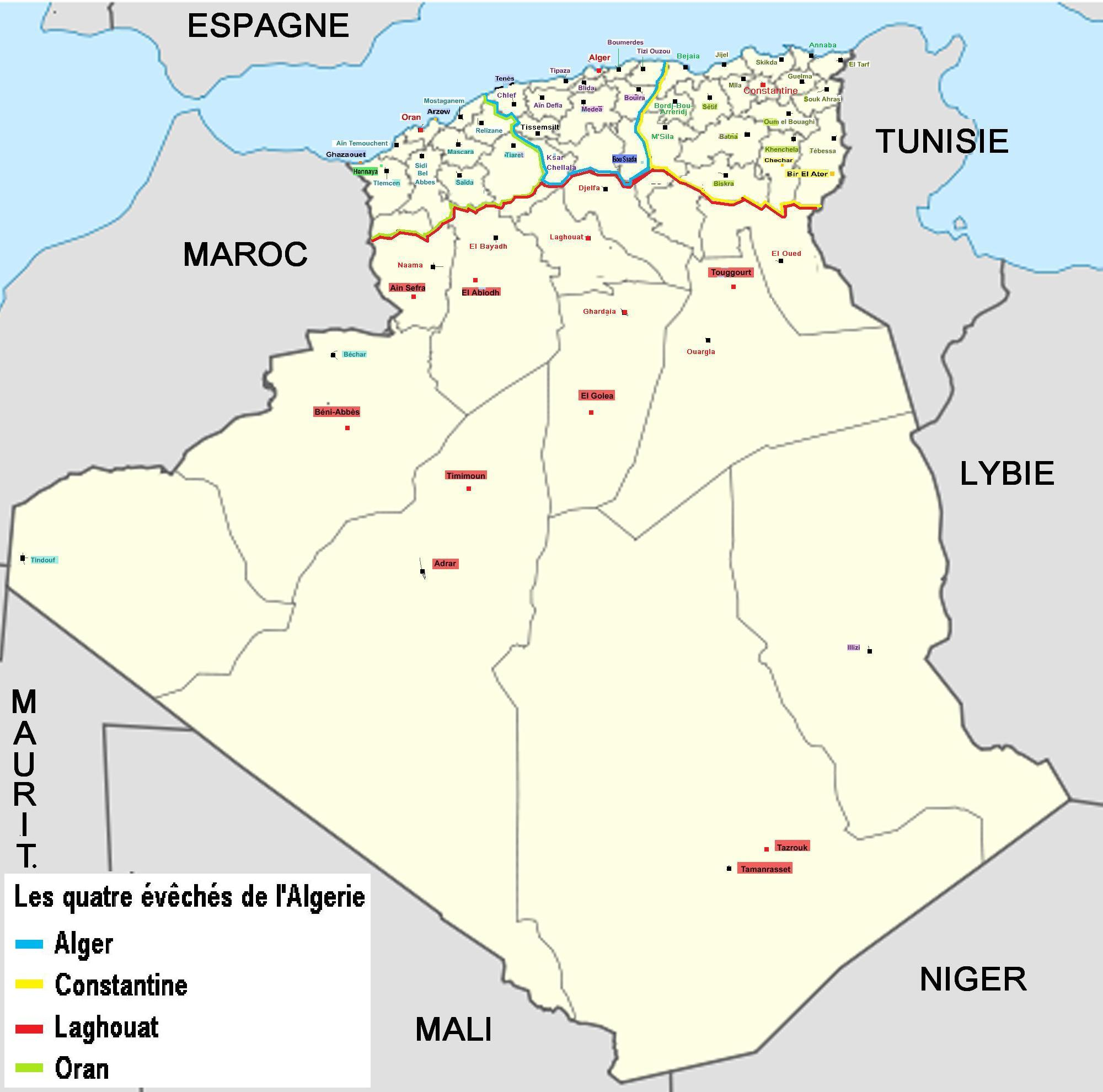
Map of Algerian dioceses

The country is divided into four Latin dioceses, including one archdiocese with two suffragan dioceses and one exempt diocese (i.e., immediately subject to the Holy See).

=== Ecclesiastical province of Alger ===
- Metropolitan Archdiocese of Alger
  - Diocese of Constantine
  - Diocese of Oran

=== Exempt diocese ===
- Diocese of Laghouat (Immediately subject to the Holy See)

During French colonial rule, the Catholic population of Algeria peaked at over one million, but most of these left following Algeria's independence in 1962. There were about 45,000 Catholics residing in the country in the 1980s.

== See also ==
- List of Catholic dioceses in Algeria, including former jurisdictions, notably many titular sees
- List of Catholic churches in Algeria
- List of Saints from Africa
- List of Christian saints of Algeria
- Religion in Algeria
- Christianity in Algeria

== Sources and external links ==
- Craughwell, Thomas J. (2008). How the Barbarian Invasions Shaped the Modern World. Fair Winds Press. ISBN 978-1-61673-432-9.
- Elliott, Simon (31 March 2024). Vandal Heaven: Reinterpreting Post-Roman North Africa. Casemate. ISBN 978-1-63624-288-0.
- Fontaine, Darcie (20 June 2016). Decolonizing Christianity: Religion and the End of Empire in France and Algeria. Cambridge University Press. ISBN 978-1-107-11817-1.
- Foster, Elizabeth A. (4 March 2019). African Catholic: Decolonization and the Transformation of the Church. Harvard University Press. ISBN 978-0-674-23944-9.
- Kaegi, Walter E. (4 November 2010). Muslim Expansion and Byzantine Collapse in North Africa. Cambridge University Press. ISBN 978-0-521-19677-2.
- Lower, Michael (2014). "The Papacy and Christian Mercenaries of Thirteenth-Century North Africa". Speculum. 89 (3 JULY). The University of Chicago Press: 601–631. doi:10.1017/S0038713414000761. S2CID 154773840.
- McGee, Martin (2008). Christian Martyrs for a Muslim People. Paulist Press. ISBN 978-0-8091-4539-3.
- Roggema, Barbara; Thomas, David Richard; Monferrer Sala, Juan Pedro (21 March 2011). Christian-Muslim Relations. A Bibliographical History. Volume 3 (1050-1200). BRILL. ISBN 978-90-04-19515-8.
- Official Website of the Catholic Church in Algeria
- Statistics relating to the Catholic Church in Algeria
- GCatholic.org.
