= Diocese of Laghouat =

Roman Catholic diocese in Algeria

Coordinates: 32.4833°N 3.6667°E

Diocese of Laghouat Dioecesis Laghuatensis
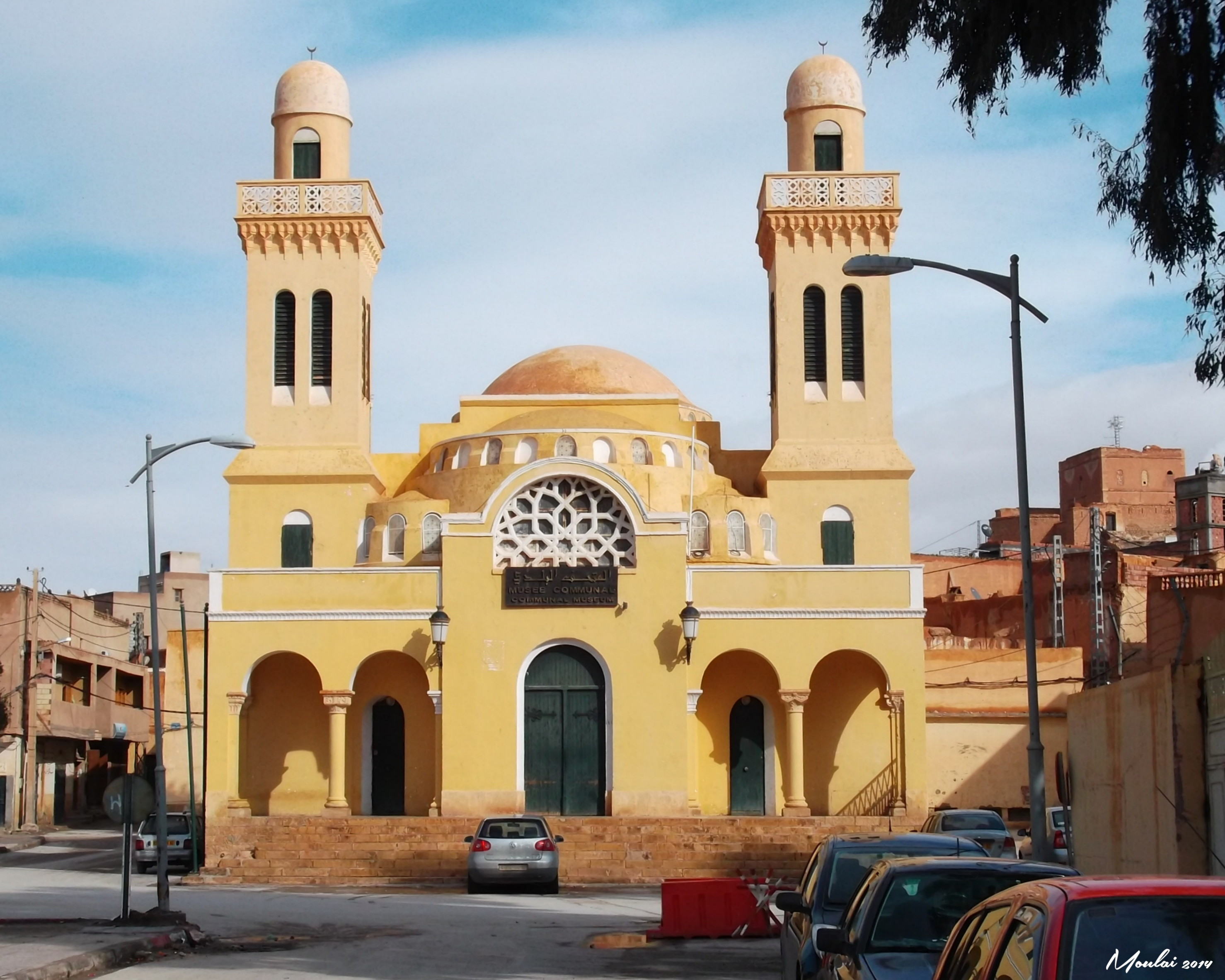
- Former Cathedral of St. Hilary

Location
- Country: Algeria
- Ecclesiastical province: Immediately subject to the Holy See
- Metropolitan: Laghouat

Statistics
- Area: 2,107,708 km^{2} (813,791 sq mi)
- Population: Total; Catholics: (as of 2021); 5,103,660; 2,160 (0.0%)
- Parishes: 9

Information
- Denomination: Catholic Church
- Sui iuris church: Latin Church
- Rite: Roman Rite
- Established: July 19, 1901
- Cathedral: Ghardaïa Cathedral (a pro-cathedral)
- Secular priests: 2 (Diocesan); 8 (Religious Orders)

Current leadership
- Pope: Leo XIV
- Bishop: Diego Sarrió Cucarella, M. Afr.
- Bishops emeritus: Claude Rault, M. Afr.

Map
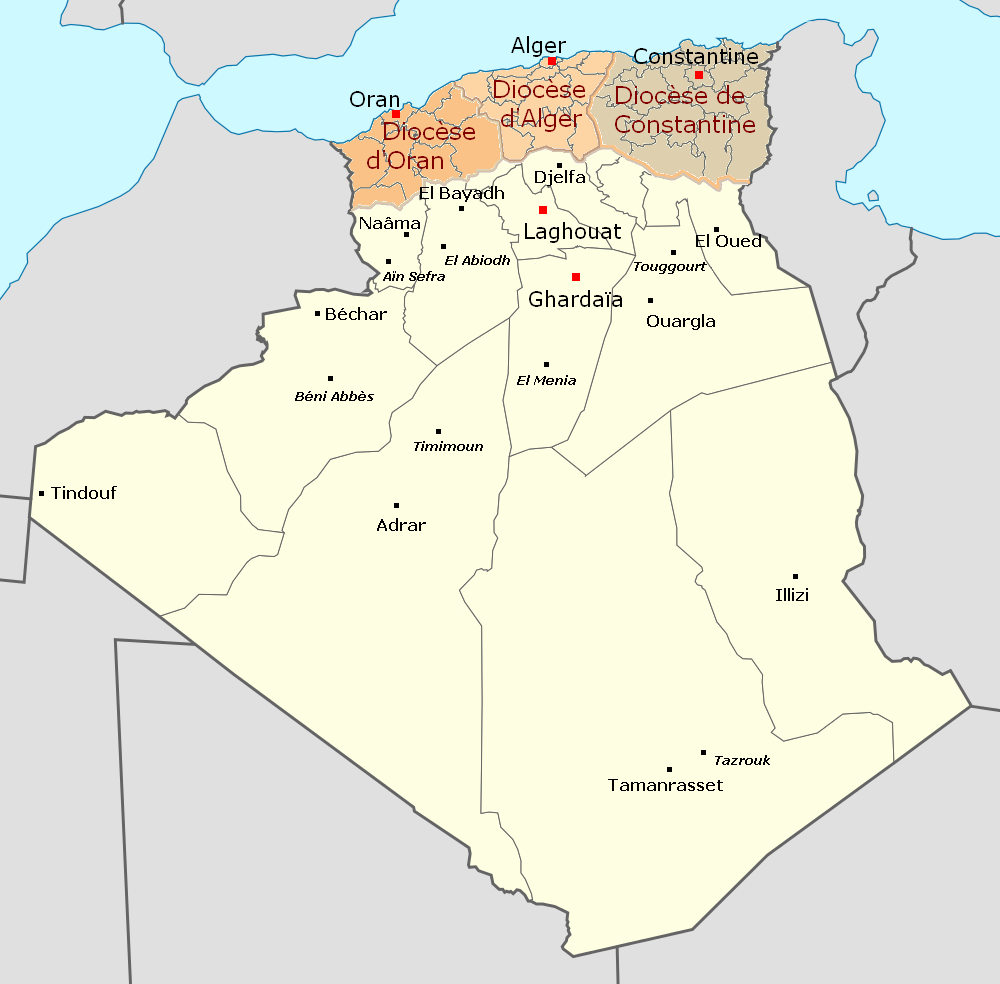

Website
- Diocesan Website

The Diocese of Laghouat (Latin: Dioecesis Laghuatensis) is a Latin Church ecclesiastical jurisdiction or diocese of the Catholic Church covering the sparsely populated Saharan inland of Algeria.

It is immediately subject to the Holy See and not part of any ecclesiastical province, and depends on the missionary Dicastery for Evangelization.

The bishops cathedra is found in the Pro-Cathedral of Ghardaïa in the episcopal see of Ghardaïa. The former cathedral is the now-deconsecrated church of Saint Hilarion, in the city of Laghouat.

== History ==
The diocese was established on 19 July 1901 as the Apostolic Prefecture of Ghardaïa (Latin: Ghardaiensis) on territory split off from the then Apostolic Vicariate of Sahara and Sudan (now the Archdiocese of Bamako in present Mali), also a pre-diocesan missionary jurisdiction. It was renamed on 10 January 1921 to the Apostolic Prefecture of Ghardaïa in the Sahara (Italian: Ghardaïa nel Sahara, Latin: Ghardaiensis in Sahara.)

On 28 April 1942, it lost western territory to establish the then Apostolic Prefecture of Niamey (now the Archdiocese of Niamey.)

The prefecture was promoted on 10 June 1948 to an apostolic vicariate, entitled to a titular bishop.

On 5 July 1954, it lost western territory again to establish the then Apostolic Prefecture of Spanish Sahara and Ifni (now named the Apostolic Prefecture of Western Sahara)

The vicariate was promoted on 14 September 1955 to the Diocese of Laghouat.

== Statistics ==
As of 2019, it pastorally served 2,080 Catholics (0.04% of 4,902,760 total) on 2,107,708 km² in 10 parishes with 14 priests (3 diocesan, 11 religious) and 46 lay religious (20 brothers, 26 sisters).

== Ordinaries ==
=== Apostolic Prefects of Ghardaïa ===
- Cardinal Charles Lavigerie (apostolic administrator 13 March 1891 – 25 November 1892)
- Charles Guérin (1901–1910)
- Henry Bardou (1911–1916)
- Louis David (1916–1919)
- Gustave-Jean-Marie Nouet, MAfr (28 April 1919 – 10 January 1921); see below

=== Apostolic Prefects of Ghardaïa nel Sahara ===
- Gustave-Jean-Marie Nouet, MAfr (10 January 1921 – 1941); see above
- Georges-Louis Mercier, MAfr (1941 – 10 June 1948); see below

=== Apostolic Vicar of Ghardaïa nel Sahara ===
- Georges-Louis Mercier, MAfr (10 June 1948 – 14 September 1955); see above & below

=== Bishops of Laghouat ===
1. Georges-Louis Mercier, MAfr (14 September 1955 – 11 January 1968); see above
2. Jean-Marie Michel Arthur Alix Zacharie Raimbaud, MAfr (11 January 1968 – 25 June 1989)
3. Michel-Joseph-Gérard Gagnon, MAfr (4 February 199 – 11 June 2004)
  - Michel Larbubu, MAfr (apostolic administrator 29 April 2004 – 26 October 2004)
4. Claude Jean Narcisse Rault, MAfr (26 October 2004 – 16 March 2017)
5. John MacWilliam, MAfr (16 March 2017 – 25 January 2025)
6. Diego Sarrió Cucarella, MAfr (19 March 2025 — )

== See also ==
- List of Catholic dioceses in Algeria
- Roman Catholicism in Algeria

== Sources and external links ==
- GCatholic.org, with incumbent biography links - data for all sections
- Catholic Hierarchy
- Diocese of Laghouat Website (French)
