= John MacWilliam =

The Most Reverend John MacWilliam M. Afr.
- Bishop Emeritus of Laghouat
- Church: Roman Catholic Church
- Province: Immediately subject to the Holy See
- Diocese: Diocese of Laghouat
- Appointed: 16 March 2017
- Predecessor: Claude Rault
- Successor: Diego Sarrió Cucarella
- Other post: Superior Provincial for North Africa (2015 to present)

Orders
- Ordination: December 1991 (deacon); 4 July 1992 (priest)
- Consecration: 20 May 2017 by Michael L. Fitzgerald

Personal details
- Born: John Gordon MacWilliam; 20 November 1948 (age 77)
- Denomination: Roman Catholicism
- Education: Pontifical Institute of Arab and Islamic Studies

John Gordon MacWilliam, M. Afr. (born 20 November 1948) is a British Roman Catholic bishop and former soldier. From 2017 to 2025, he was the Bishop of Laghouat in Algeria. From 1968 to 1984, he was an officer of the Queen's Regiment in the British Army. After leaving the military, he joined the White Fathers, making his vows in 1991 and being ordained priest in 1992. After studying in London and in Rome, he ministered in Algeria and in Tunisia. In 2015, he was appointed Superior Provincial of the White Fathers for North Africa.

== Early life and education ==
MacWilliam was born on 20 November 1948 in Wimbledon, London, England. He was educated at a Catholic school (Worth School) and at a number of military schools due to his father's military career.

== Career ==
=== Military career ===
MacWilliam underwent officer training at the Royal Military Academy Sandhurst. On 20 December 1968, he was commissioned into the Queen's Regiment, British Army, as a second lieutenant. He was promoted to lieutenant on 20 June 1970, and to captain on 20 December 1974.

Having attended the Staff College, Camberley, he was promoted to major on 30 September 1981. He retired from the British Army on 21 August 1984. He had seen active service in Northern Ireland during The Troubles, and in Oman.

=== Ecclesiastical career ===
Having left the British Army, MacWilliam joined the Missionaries of Africa, a Roman Catholic society of apostolic life, who are also known as the White Fathers. From 1984 to 1986, he studied philosophy at Society's Missionary Institute in London. He spent 1986 and 1987 in Fribourg, Switzerland, and then spent two years training in the Maghreb. From 1989 to 1992, he studied theology in London.

In December 1991, MacWilliam made his vows thereby becoming a professed member of the Missionaries of Africa (M. Afr.). He was ordained as a deacon in December 1991 and as a priest on 4 July 1992. He then continued his studies, studying Islam at the Pontifical Institute of Arab and Islamic Studies in Rome between 1992 and 1995.

In 1994, four members of the White Father mission in Tizi Ouzou, Algeria, were murdered in their home. In 1995, MacWilliam volunteered to go to Algeria to re-open the mission in Tizi Ouzou. He served in Algeria between 1995 and 2008, during which violence against Christians increased and the Civil War was fought. He then worked in Tunisia. He has served as Superior Provincial for North Africa (covering Algeria and Tunisia) since 2015.

==== Episcopal ministry ====
On 16 March 2017, it was announced by the Holy See, that MacWilliam would be the next Bishop of Laghouat in succession to Claude Rault. He was consecrated a bishop on 20 May 2017 at Worth Abbey. The principal consecrator was Michael L. Fitzgerald, and the principal co-consecrators were Rault and Ilario Antoniazzi. He was succeeded in 2025 by fellow Missionary of Africa Diego Sarrió Cucarella.
