= Kurian Mathew Vayalunkal =

Indian prelate of the Catholic Church (born 1966)

His Excellency, His Grace Kurian Mathew Vayalumkal
- Apostolic Nuncio to Chile; Titular Archbishop of Ratiaria
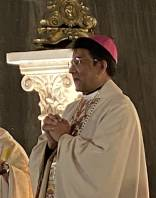
- Church: Syro Malabar Catholic Church
- Appointed: 15 March 2025
- Predecessor: Alberto Ortega Martín
- Other post: Titular Archbishop of Ratiaria
- Previous posts: Apostolic Nuncio to Algeria and Tunisia (2021-2025); Apostolic Nuncio to Papua New Guinea and the Solomon Islands (2016–2021)

Orders
- Ordination: 27 December 1991 by Kuriakose Kunnacherry
- Consecration: 25 July 2016 by Mathew Moolakkatt

Personal details
- Born: 4 August 1966 (age 60) Kerala, India
- Education: Pontifical Ecclesiastical Academy

Styles of Kurian Mathew Vayalumkal
- Reference style: His Excellency; His Grace
- Spoken style: Your Excellency
- Religious style: Archbishop

Kurian Mathew Vayalumkal (born 4 August 1966) is an Indian prelate of the Catholic Church who works in the diplomatic service of the Holy See as Apostolic Nuncio to Chile. He was the Apostolic Nuncio to Papua New Guinea and the Solomon Islands from 2016 to 2021 and to Algeria and Tunisia from 2021-2025.

== Biography ==
Kurian Mathew Vayalumkal was born on 4 August 1966 in Vadavathoor, Kottayam, Kerala, the first of four boys born to Mr M.C. Mathai and Mrs Annamma Mathai.

He completed his minor seminary from St. Stanislaus Minor Seminary. He completed his Philosophy and Theology studies at St. Joseph's pontifical Seminary, Aluva. In 1998 he obtained a doctorate in canon law from Pontifical University of the Holy Cross in Rome. He also completed his diplomatic studies at the Pontifical Ecclesiastical Academy.

He was ordained a priest on 27 December 1991.

== Diplomatic career ==
He entered the diplomatic service of the Holy See in 1998 and served in Guinea, Korea, the Dominican Republic, Bangladesh, Hungary and Egypt. He was also sent to Haiti in 2010 to oversee the Vatican's humanitarian work after an earthquake.

On 3 May 2016, Pope Francis appointed him Apostolic Nuncio to Papua New Guinea and Titular Archbishop of Ratiaria.

He received his episcopal consecration in Christ the King Cathedral of the Syro-Malabar Catholic Archeparchy of Kottayam on 25 July 2016 from Mathew Moolakkatt, Archbishop of Kottayam. He was appointed Apostolic Nuncio to the Solomon Islands on 21 September 2016.

Pope Francis appointed him Nuncio to Algeria on 1 January 2021. On 2 February 2021, he was added the responsibilities for Tunisia as well.

On 15 March 2025, he was appointed nuncio to Chile.

== Writings ==
- The Relations Between Particular Church and State. The Role of Papal Representatives. Rome: Santa Croce. 2004.

== See also ==
- List of heads of the diplomatic missions of the Holy See
