= Diego Sarrió Cucarella =

Spanish catholic clergyman, bishop of Laghouat in Algieria

His Excellency, The Most Reverend Diego Ramón Sarrió Cucarella M.Afr.
- Bishop of Laghouat
- Diocese: Laghouat
- In office: March 19, 2025

Orders
- Ordination: 2 June 2001
- Consecration: 19 March 2025 by Luis Tagle

Personal details
- Born: July 20, 1971 Valencia, Spain
- Coat of arms

Diego Ramón Sarrió Cucarella M.Afr. (born 20 July 1971) is a Spanish Roman Catholic prelate serving as bishop of Laghouat, Algeria since 19 March 2025. He holds a PhD in Islamic Studies from Georgetown University, and previously served as the director and president of the Pontifical Institute for Arabic and Islamic Studies. He is a member of the Missionaries of Africa, commonly known as the White Fathers, and previously served their mission in the Diocese of Laghouat after his ordination to the priesthood on 2 June 2001. He is an expert in the intellectual history of Christian-Muslim relations and has lived in Algeria, Egypt, Sudan, and Tunisia. Immediately prior to his appointment as bishop, he was serving in a parish in Muscat, Oman.
