= Domenico De Luca =

Tunisian-Italian prelate (1928–2006)

Domenico De Luca (2 January 1928 – 16 September 2006) was a Tunisia-born Italian prelate of the Catholic Church who served for ten years as Apostolic Nuncio to Morocco.

Domenico De Luca was born on 2 January 1928 in Sfax, Tunisia. He was ordained a priest of the Archdiocese of Naples on 27 July 1952.

He entered the Pontifical Ecclesiastical Academy in 1957 to prepare for a career in the diplomatic service of the Holy See.

On 22 May 1993, Pope John Paul II appointed him Titular Archbishop of Teglata in Numidia and Apostolic Nuncio to Morocco. He received his episcopal consecration from Cardinal Angelo Sodano on 3 July.

Pope John Paul II accepted his resignation on 17 July 2003.

He died on 16 September 2006.
