= Diocese of Constantine =

Roman Catholic diocese in Algeria

Diocese of Constantine (-Hippone) Dioecesis Constantinianus (-Hipponensis Regiorum) Diocèse de Constantine et Hippone

catholic
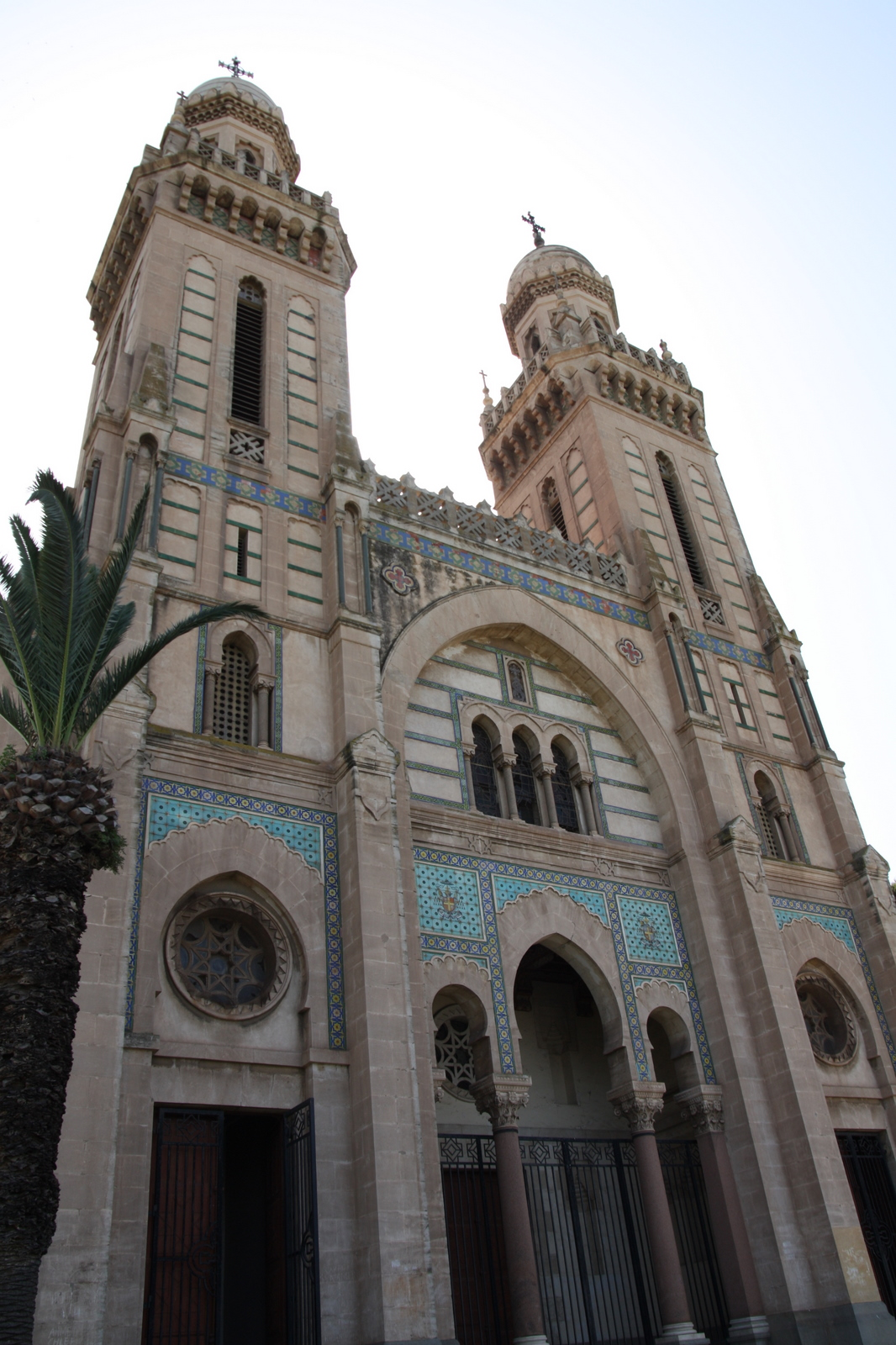
- Basilica of Saint Augustine, Annaba

Location
- Country: Algeria
- Ecclesiastical province: Algiers
- Coordinates: 36°52′54″N 7°44′41″E

Statistics
- Area: 110,522 km^{2} (42,673 sq mi)
- Population: Total; Catholics: (as of 2021); 14,922,315; 650 (0.0%)
- Parishes: 6

Information
- Denomination: Catholic Church
- Rite: Roman
- Established: 25 July 1866
- Cathedral: Basilica of Saint Augustine (Annaba)
- Secular priests: 4 (Diocesan); 7 (Religious Orders)

Current leadership
- Pope: Leo XIV
- Bishop elect: Michel Guillaud
- Metropolitan Archbishop: Jean-Paul Vesco

Map
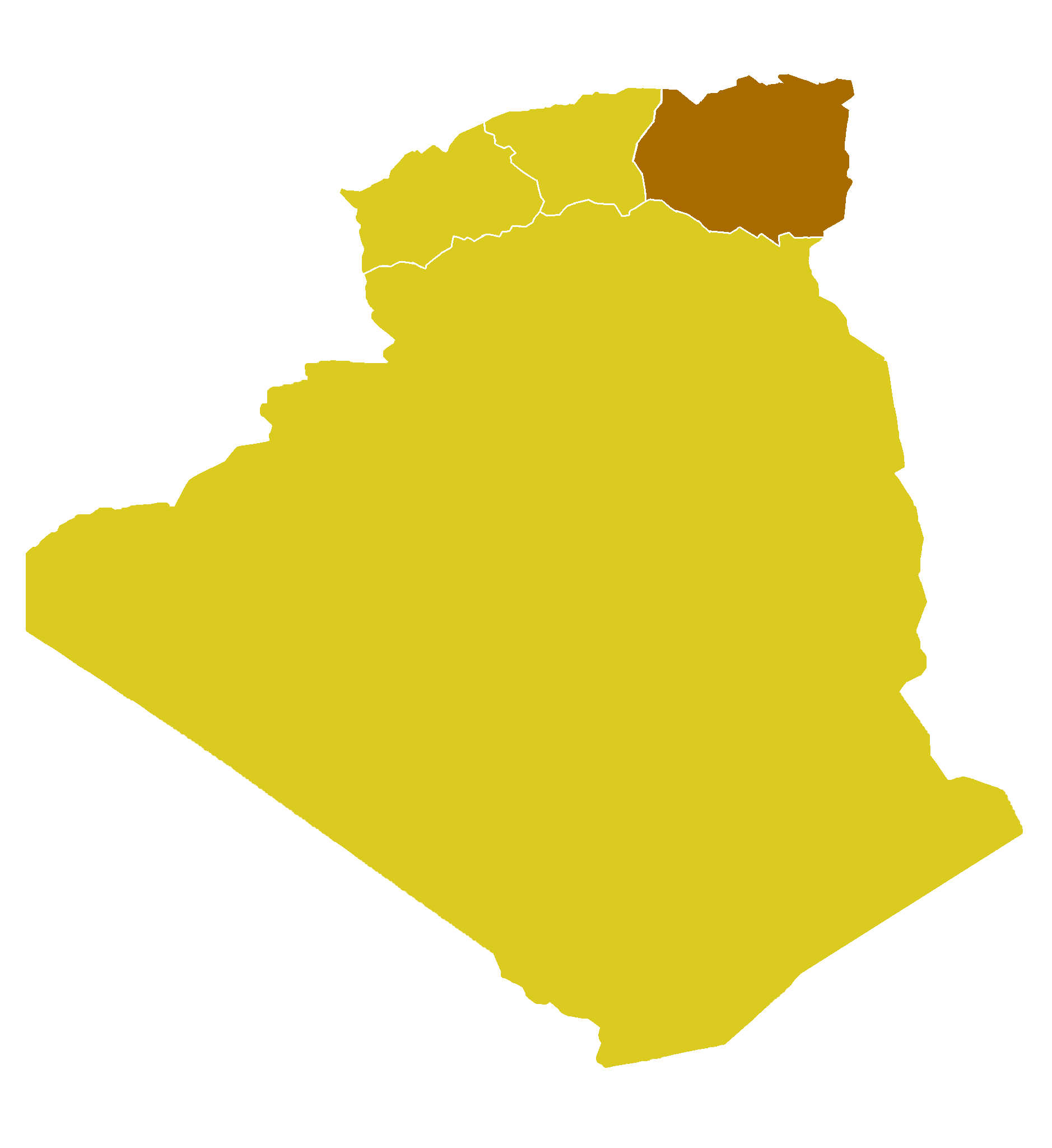

Website
- Official Website

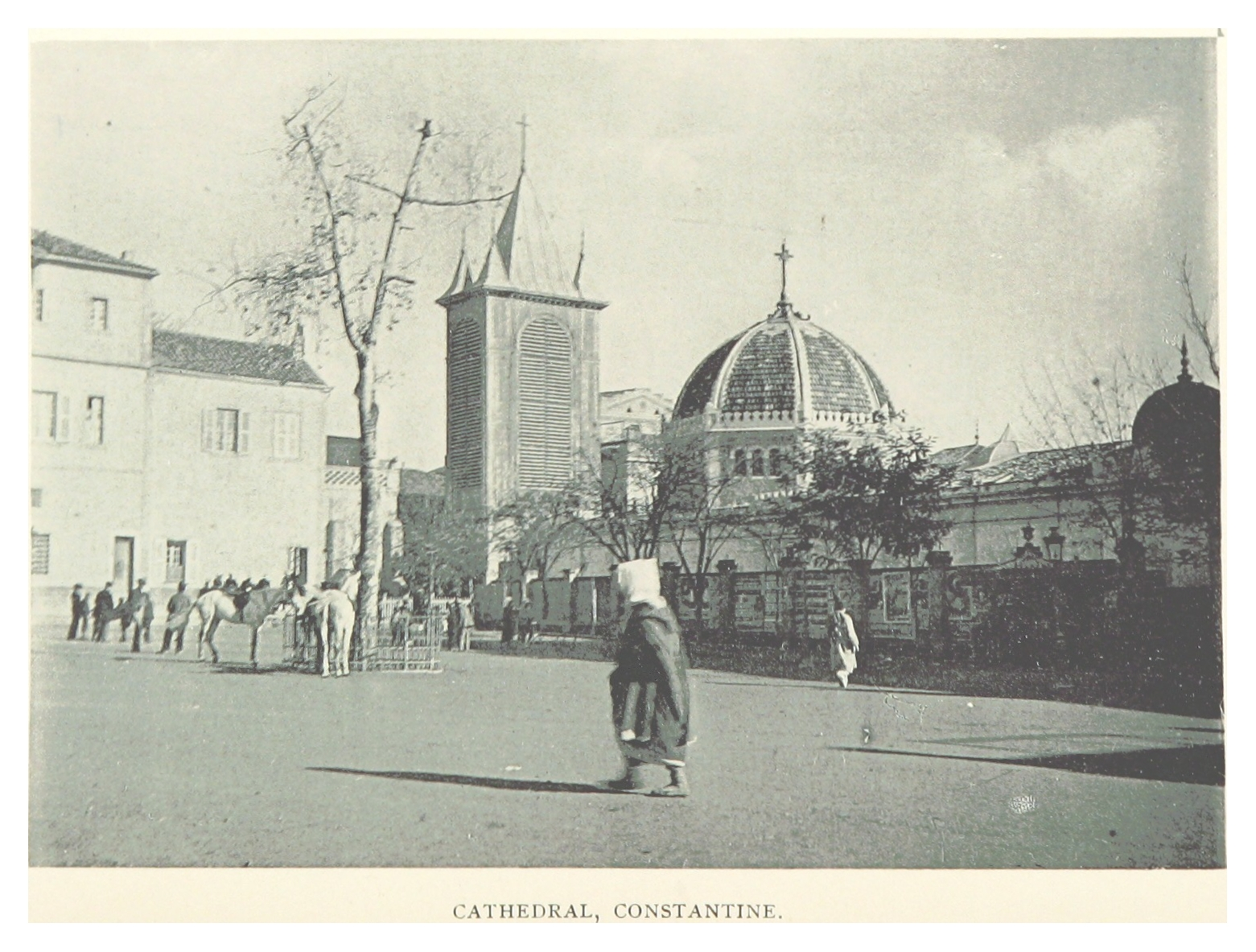
The Cathedral in Constantine, 1894

The Roman Catholic Diocese of Constantine (-Hippone) (Latin: Dioecesis Constantinianus (-Hipponensis Regiorum), French: Diocèse de Constantine et Hippone) is a Roman Catholic diocese in the ecclesiastical province of Algiers in Algeria.

== History ==
Already since the second century the town of Constantine, then known as Cirta, was the seat of a bishop until the region fell to the invading Arab Muslims in the seventh century.

On 25 July 1866, the diocese was established from the Diocese of Algiers as Diocese of Constantine. Its name was changed to the Diocese of Constantine (-Hippone) on 23 September 1867. The territory of this diocese is much bigger than that of the ancient diocese of Cirta and compromises around 195 dioceses that existed in the fifth century. Before the enforcement of the Association law of 1901, the Lazarists, the Little Brothers of Mary and the White Fathers were active in the diocese.

== Geography ==
The diocese is located in north eastern Algeria. It includes parishes in Constantine, Annaba, Skikda, Sétif, Béjaïa, Batna, and Tébessa.

== Special churches ==
The current pro-cathedral is the minor basilica Basilica of Saint Augustine in Annaba (Hippo). The former seat of the diocese was the Cathédrale Notre-Dame des Sept-Douleurs in Constantine. The building was constructed in 1730 to serve as Souq el-Ghizal mosque, enlarged and converted to a Catholic cathedral during the French colonial period, and then returned to its original use in 1962 as the El Bey Mosque.

== Bishops of Constantine ==
- Félix de Las Cases (12 January 1867 – 29 August 1870)
- Joseph-Jean-Louis Robert (27 February 1872 – 15 July 1878), appointed Bishop of Marseille, France
- Prosper Auguste Dusserre (31 July 1878 – 27 February 1880)
- François-Charles-Marie Gillard (27 February 1880 - 29 September 1880), died without being consecrated
- Barthélemy Clément Combes (17 February 1881 – 15 June 1893), appointed Archbishop of Carthage
- Ludovic-Henri-Marie-Ixile Julien-Laferrière (29 January 1894 – 12 August 1896)
- Jules-Etienne Gazaniol (13 October 1896 – 22 May 1913)
- Jules-Alexandre-Léon Bouissière (26 May 1913 – 10 September 1916)
- Amiel-François Bessière (2 January 1917 – 3 October 1923)
- Emile-Jean-François Thiénard (24 March 1924 – 26 October 1945)
- Léon-Étienne Duval (3 November 1946 – 3 February 1954), appointed Archbishop of Algiers (Cardinal in 1965)
- Paul Pierre Pinier (27 March 1954 – 31 January 1970)
- Jean Baptiste Joseph Scotto (19 August 1970 – 25 March 1983)
- Gabriel Piroird, IdP (25 March 1983 – 21 November 2008)
- Paul Desfarges, S.J. (21 November 2008 - 24 December 2016), appointed Archbishop of Algiers
- Nicolas Lhernould (9 December 2019–4 April 2024)
- Michel Guillaud (11 July 2025 - present)

== Sources ==
- GCatholic.org
- catholic-hierarchy.org
