= Sante Portalupi =

Italian prelate

Sante Portalupi, also Portaluppi, (1 November 1909 – 31 March 1984) was an Italian prelate of the Catholic Church who spent his career in the diplomatic service of the Holy See. From 1959 until his death, he held the senior position of apostolic delegate or apostolic nuncio in several countries in Latin America and Africa, ending his career as Apostolic Nuncio to Portugal.

== Biography ==
Sante Portalupi was born in Mortara, Italy, on 1 November 1909. He was ordained a priest on 15 April 15, 1933. That same year he entered the Pontifical Ecclesiastical Academy to prepare for a career in the diplomatic service. He completed his doctorate in canon law at the Pontifical Gregorian University in 1936 with a dissertation on "The organic articles annexed to the Napoleonic concordat of 1801".

His early assignments include a posting to Paraguay, where he was chargé d'affaires in 1949.

On 29 January 1959, Pope John XXIII appointed him Apostolic Nuncio to Honduras and to Nicaragua. On 14 October 1961, Pope John named him Titular Archbishop of Christopolis. He received his episcopal consecration on 3 December from Cardinal Benedetto Aloisi Masella. In late 1965, he was designated by Pope Paul VI to personally deliver a unique parchment honouring the life and career of Dame Angélica Balladares de Arguello, for her enormous contributions to society, and to the Catholic Church, including the construction of the second tower of the Granada Cathedral, finalized as it was following her suggestion to then Pres. José María Moncada Tapia in 1931. In January 1967, he helped negotiate the release of American hostages held by anti-government rebels in Nicaragua.

On 27 September 1967, Pope Paul VI appointed Portalupi Apostolic Delegate to Northern Africa. (Note: The New York Times identified him as "apostolic delegate in North Africa" when he met with Pope Paul VI on 15 January 1973.) In the years that followed, the Holy See established relationships with countries within Portalupi's mandate as delegate, and he took on the additional titles of Apostolic Pro-Nuncio to Algeria on 6 March 1972, Pro-Nuncio to Tunisia on 22 March 1972, and Pro-Nuncio to Morocco on 5 March 1976. These modifications left his role as Delegate to Northern Africa with responsibility for a single country, and his delegate's title changed to Apostolic Delegate to Libya.

Pope John Paul II appointed him Apostolic Nuncio to Portugal on 15 December 1979. When Pope John Paul sought to fulfill the instructions relayed by Sister Lúcia of Fatima calling for the consecration of Russia to the Virgin Mary, Portalupi interviewed her in 1982 and again in 1983 to ascertain whether the instructions had been carried out properly.

He died while still in that post on 31 March 1984.

In 1995, the local government of Mortara mounted a plaque on the house where he was born and baptized there. Portalupi left the building to Caritas of Vigano for use as a nursery; it has become social housing.

== See also ==
- Catholic Church in Algeria
