= Basilica of Saint Augustine (Annaba) =

Catholic basilica in Annaba, Algeria, dedicated to Saint Augustine of Hippo

Coordinates: 36°52′55″N 7°44′41″E

Basilica of Saint Augustine بازيليكا القديس أوغسطينوس Basilique de Saint-Augustin
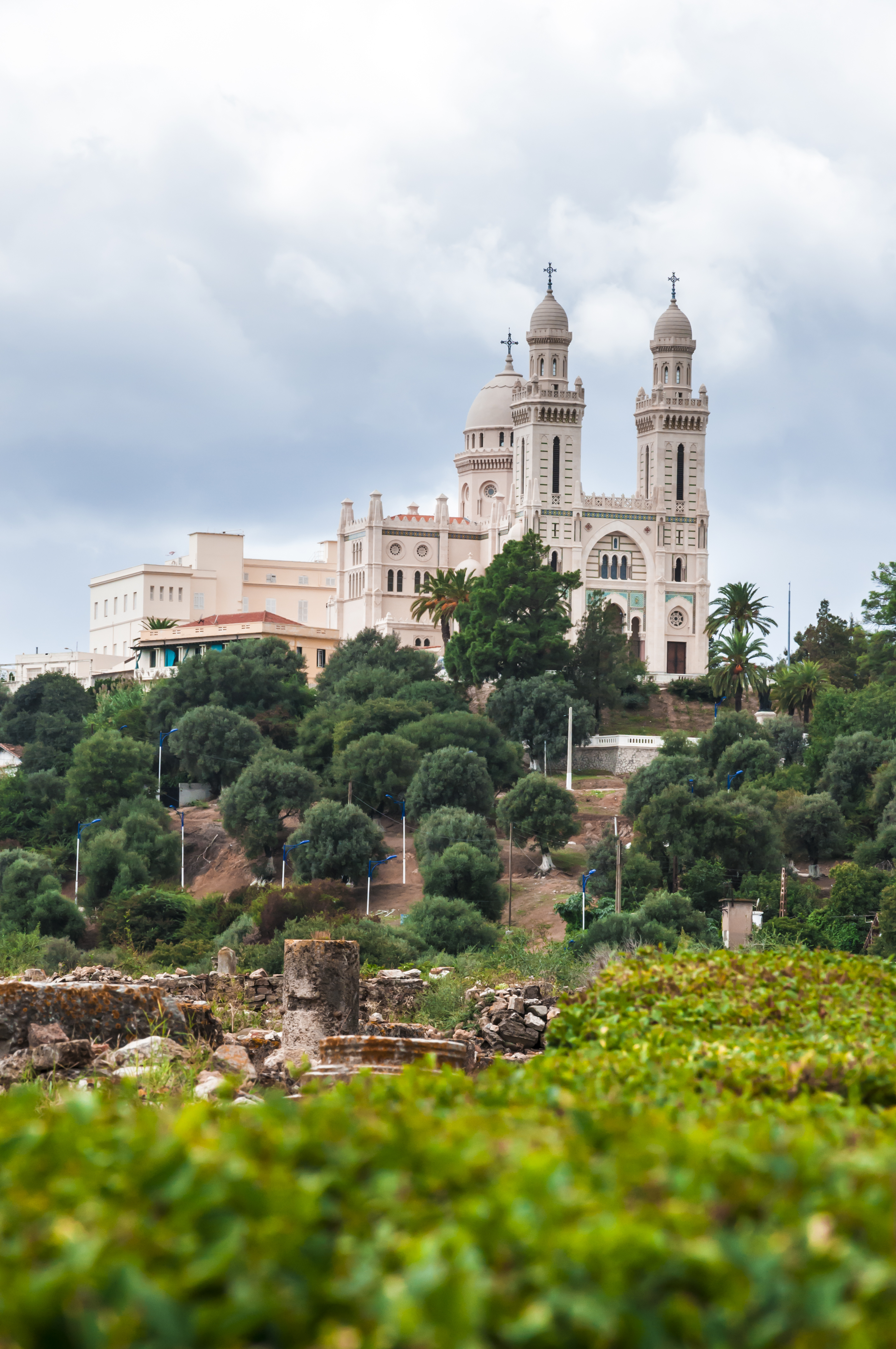
- View of the Basilica of Saint Augustine from the ruins of Hippo

Religion
- Affiliation: Catholic Church
- Province: Diocese of Constantine
- Rite: Latin Rite
- Ecclesiastical or organisational status: Basilica, parish church
- Status: Active

Location
- Location: Annaba, Algeria
- Interactive map of Basilica of Saint Augustine بازيليكا القديس أوغسطينوس; Basilique de Saint-Augustin

Architecture
- Type: Church
- Groundbreaking: 1881
- Completed: 1900

The Basilica of Saint Augustine (Arabic: بازيليكا القديس أوغسطينوس; French: Basilique de Saint-Augustin) is a Catholic basilica and pro-cathedral located in Annaba (formerly known as Bonê), Algeria. It is dedicated to Saint Augustine of Hippo.

== History ==
Construction of the basilica began in 1881 and finished on March 29, 1900, led by Abbe Pougnet. The church was dedicated April 24, 1914 and dedicated to Saint Augustine of Hippo. It was built not far from the remains of the Basilica Pacis built by Saint Augustine, where he died while the city was besieged by Vandals. The statue of St. Augustine in the basilica contains one of his arm bones. It is under the circumscription of the Diocese of Constantine. In 1842, a portion of Augustine's right arm (cubitus) was secured from Pavia and returned to Bonê (now called Annaba). It now rests in Saint Augustine's Basilica within a glass tube inserted into the arm of a life-size marble statue of Augustine.

== Architecture ==
The basilica was built with stones imported from France. Its Carrara marble, stained glass and massive arches combine Roman, Byzantine and Moorish architecture influences.

== Gallery ==
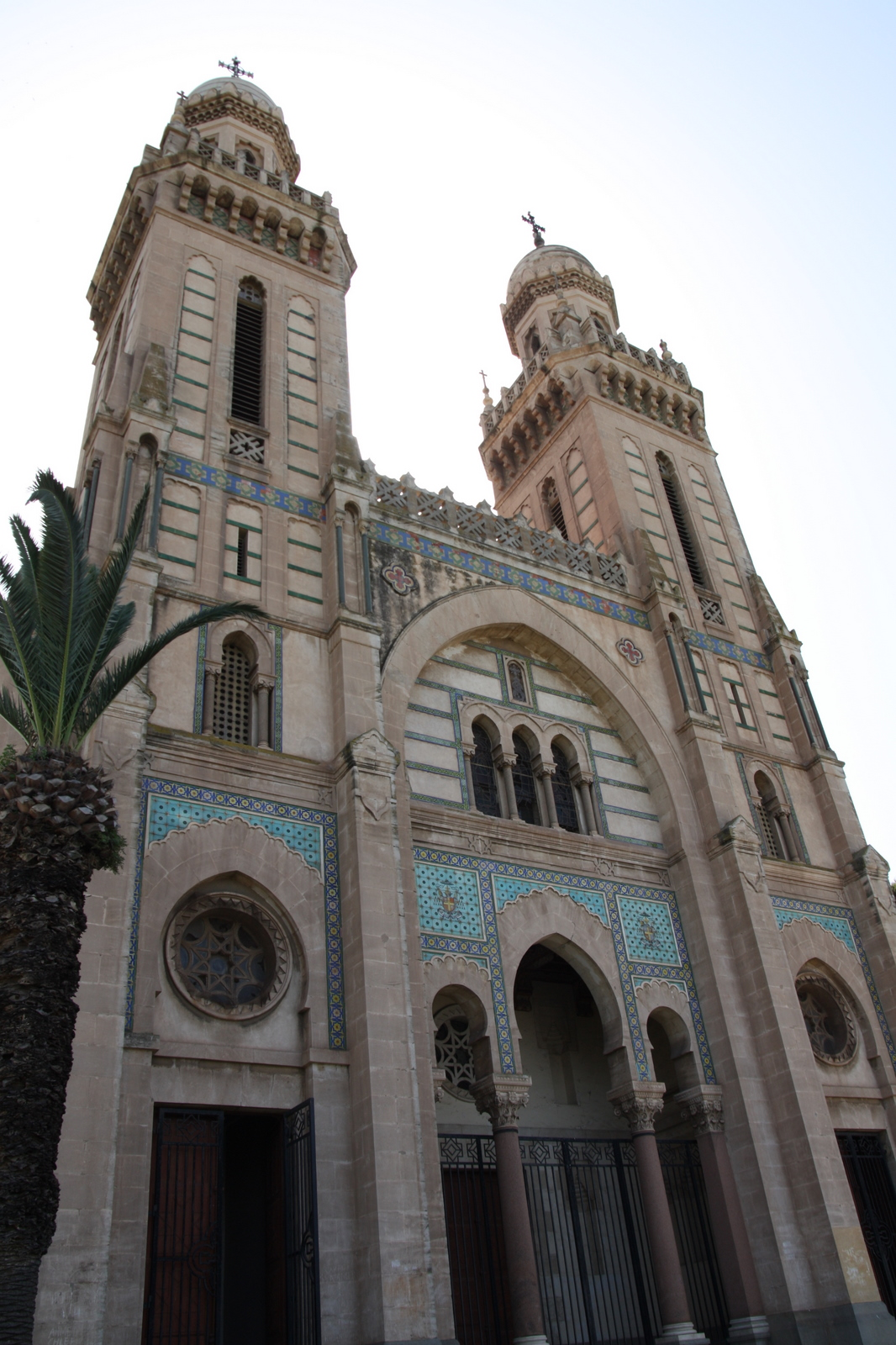

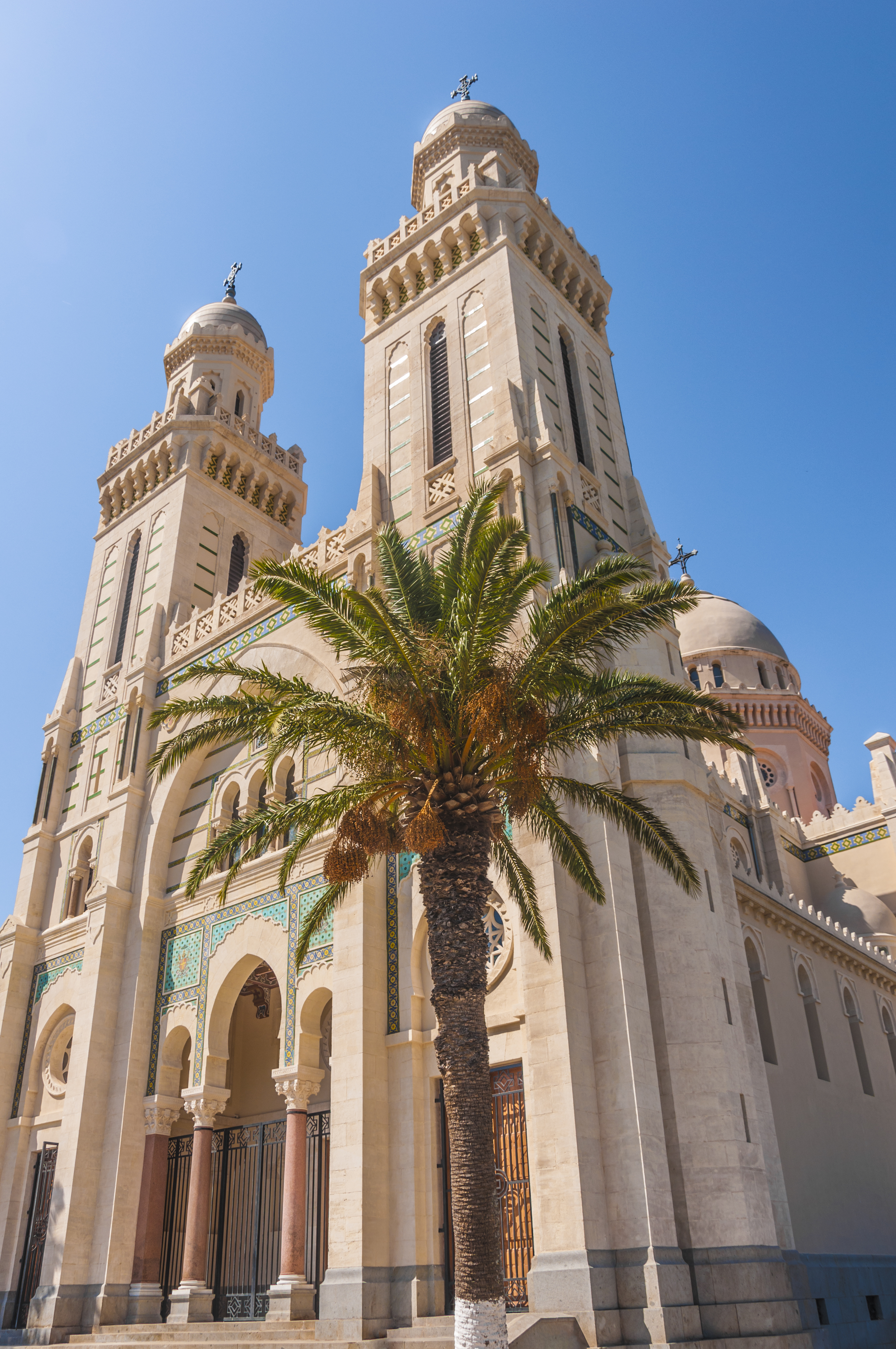

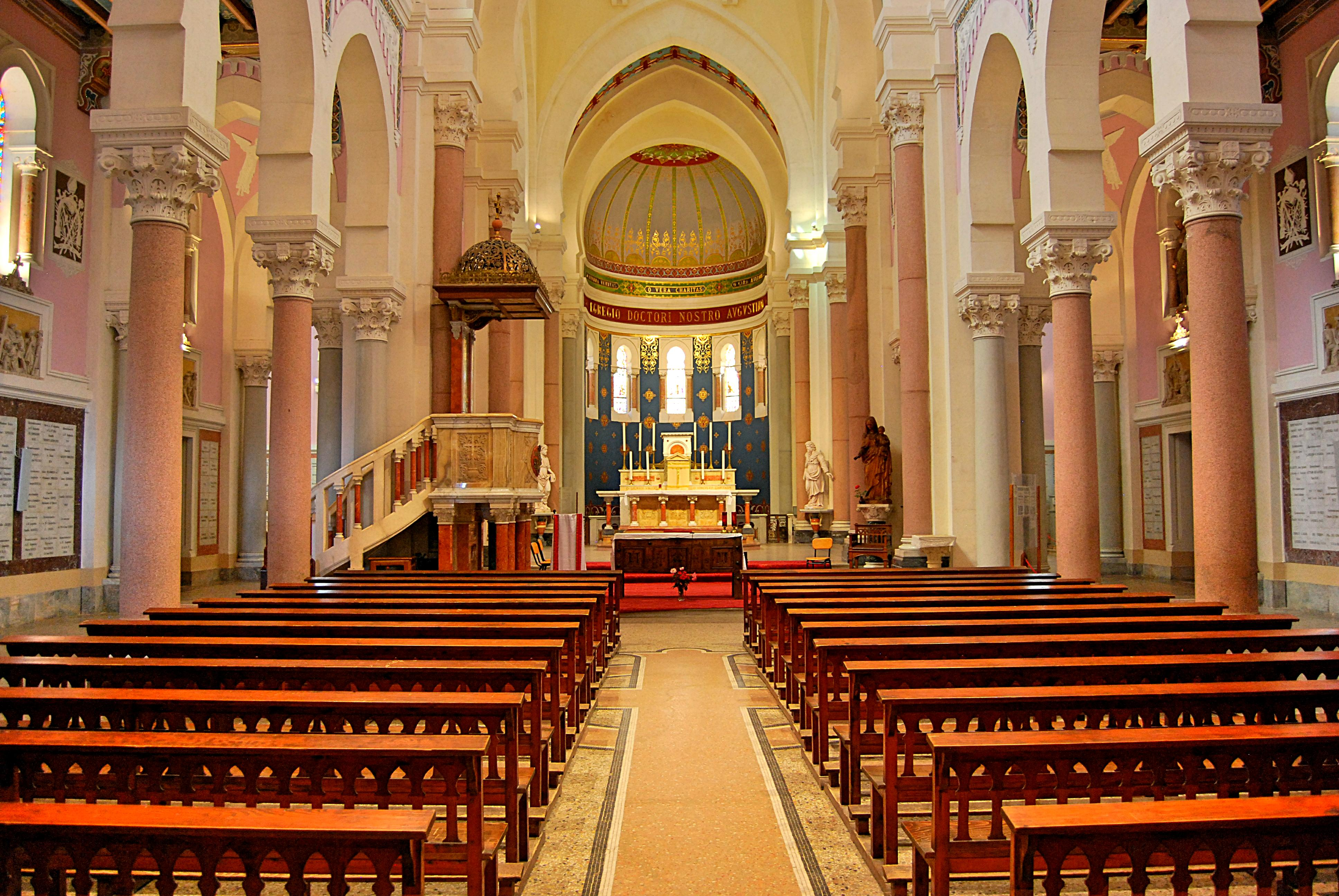

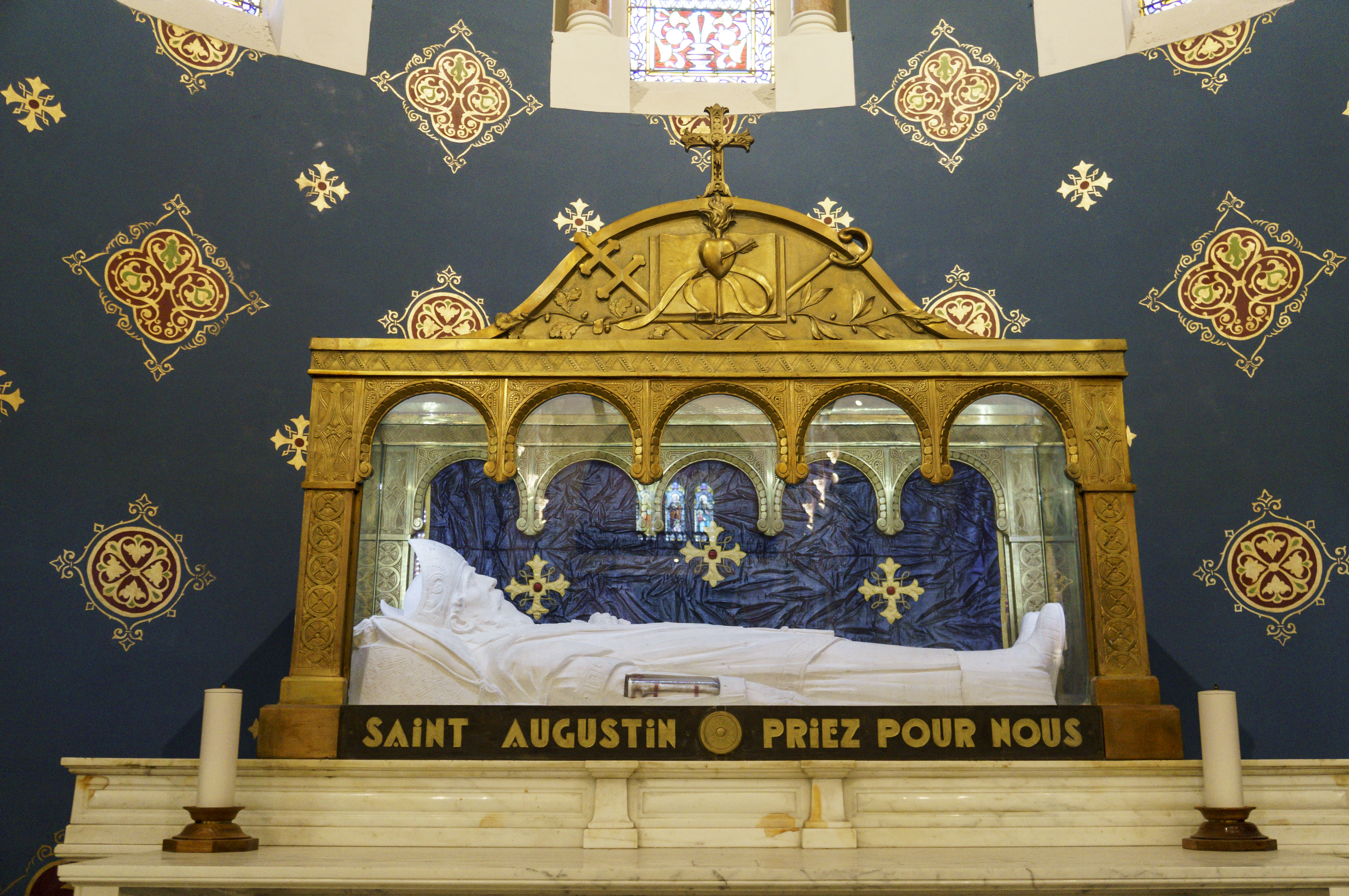

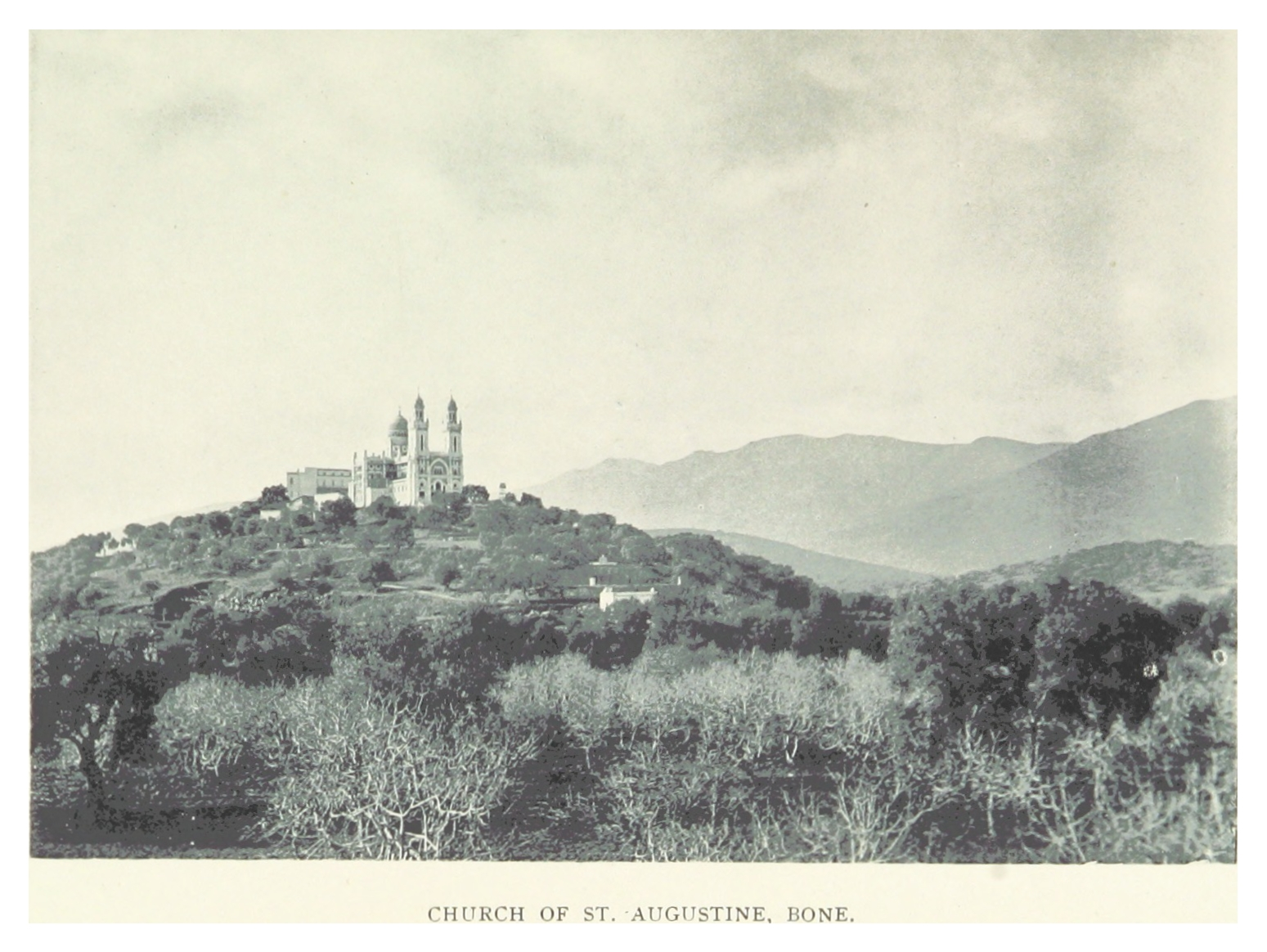
