= Regional Episcopal Conference of North Africa =

Assembly of Catholic bishops in Algeria, Libya, Morocco, Tunisia & Western Sahara

- Abbreviation: CERNA
- Formation: 1966
- Type: NGO
- Legal status: Civil nonprofit
- Purpose: To support the ministry of bishops
- Headquarters: Rabat, Morocco
- Region served: Algeria, Libya, Morocco, Tunisia, Western Sahara
- Members: Active and retired Catholic bishops of Algeria, Libya, Morocco, Tunisia, and Western Sahara
- President: Cristóbal López Romero, SDB
- Main organ: Conference

The Regional Episcopal Conference of North Africa (CERNA) (French: Conférence Episcopale Régionale du Nord de l'Afrique or Conférence des Evêques de la Région Nord de l'Afrique) is the episcopal conference of the Catholic Church in Algeria, Libya, Morocco, Tunisia, and Western Sahara. Founded in 1965, it is composed of all active and retired members of the Catholic hierarchy (i.e., diocesan, coadjutor, and auxiliary bishops) in those countries. The conference is based in Rabat, the capital of Morocco. The current President is Cristóbal López Romero, the Archbishop of Rabat.

== History ==
The Regional Episcopal Conference of North Africa was founded in 1966, with Archbishop of Algiers Cardinal Léon-Étienne Duval as its first president.

On 8 June 2007, members of the conference were received by Pope Benedict XVI in Vatican City. The five bishops present were Maroun Elias Nimeh Lahham, Claude Rault, Gabriel Piroird, Giovanni Innocenzo Martinelli, and Alphonse Georger.

On 6–9 October 2013, the Regional Episcopal Conference of North Africa met in Rome. The bishops resided at the Pontifical French Seminary and met there to discuss issues facing the bishops' respective countries and dioceses. The trip ended on 9 October, when the bishops went to St. Peter's Square to hear Pope Francis' public address. Francis personally addressed the bishops from North Africa, calling for them to "consolidate our fraternal relations with Muslims."

== Member dioceses ==
Diocese	Current prelate	Country
Archdiocese of Algiers	Jean-Paul Vesco, OP	Algeria
Apostolic Vicariate of Benghazi	Sandro Overend Rigillo O.F.M.	Libya
Diocese of Constantine	Nicolas Lhernould	Algeria
Apostolic Vicariate of Derna	vacant	Libya
Diocese of Laghouat	John MacWilliam, M. Afr.	Algeria
Apostolic Prefecture of Misurata	vacant	Libya
Diocese of Oran	Jean-Paul Vesco, OP	Algeria
Archdiocese of Rabat	Cristóbal López Romero, S.D.B.	Morocco
Archdiocese of Tanger	Santiago Agrelo Martínez, O.F.M.	Morocco
Archdiocese of Tunis	Ilario Antoniazzi	Tunisia
Apostolic Vicariate of Tripoli	George Bugeja, O.F.M.	Libya
Apostolic Prefecture of Western Sahara	Mario León Dorado, O.M.I.	Western Sahara

== Presidents ==
This is a list of the Presidents of the Regional Episcopal Conference of North Africa:

#	Image	President	See	Term
1		Cardinal Léon-Étienne Duval	Algiers	1966–1983
2		Bishop Henri Teissier	Algiers	1983–2004
3		Archbishop Fouad Twal	Tunis	2004–2005
4		Archbishop Vincent Landel, SCI di Béth	Rabat	October 2005 – January 2012
5		Archbishop Maroun Elias Nimeh Lahham	Tunis	January 2012 – November 2012
6		Archbishop Vincent Landel, SCI di Béth	Rabat	November 2012 – 2015
7		Archbishop Paul Desfarges, S.J.	Algiers	2015–2022
8		Cardinal Cristóbal López Romero, S.D.B.	Rabat	2022–

== See also ==
- Catholic Church in the Middle East
  - Catholic Church in Algeria
  - Catholic Church in Libya
  - Catholic Church in Morocco
  - Catholic Church in Tunisia
  - Catholic Church in Western Sahara
