= Davide Carraro =

Roman Catholic Bishop

Most Reverend Davide Carraro, PIME
- Bishop of Oran, Algeria
- Church: Catholic Church; Latin Church
- Diocese: Oran
- Appointed: 22 October 2023
- Predecessor: Jean-Paul Vesco

Orders
- Ordination: 27 May 2006 by Andrea Bruno Mazzocato
- Consecration: 26 January 2024 by Jean-Paul Vesco

Personal details
- Born: Davide Carraro; 26 January 1977 (age 49) Sambughè, Province of Treviso, Italy
- Motto: " God Is Love "

Davide Carraro was appointed Bishop of the Oran, Algeria, by Pope Francis on 22 October 2023.

== Early life ==
David Carraro was born on 26 January 1977 in Sambughè, Province of Treviso, Italy.

== Priesthood ==
He was ordained a priest for the Pontifical Institute for Foreign Missions in Treviso Cathedral on 27 May 2006 by the diocesan Bishop, Andrea Bruno Mazzocato.

== Episcopate ==
On 22 October 2023, Carraro was appointed Bishop of Oran by Pope Francis. He was ordained to the episcopate on 26 January 2024 at the Fort of Santa Cruz (Oran) by Archbishop Jean-Paul Vesco, his immediate predecessor at Oran, now Archbishop of Algiers, by Bishop Alphonse Georger, now retired, who had been Bishop of Oran in the years 1998–2012, and by Michele Tomasi, Bishop of Treviso.
