= Pierre Claverie =

French Catholic prelate

Blessed Pierre-Lucien Claverie OP
- Bishop of Oran
- Church: Roman Catholic Church
- Diocese: Oran
- See: Oran
- Appointed: 25 May 1981
- Term ended: 1 August 1996
- Predecessor: Henri Antoine Marie Teissier
- Successor: Alphonse Georger

Orders
- Ordination: 4 July 1965 by Jean-Baptiste-Étienne Sauvage
- Consecration: 2 October 1981 by Léon-Étienne Duval

Personal details
- Born: Pierre-Lucien Claverie; 8 May 1938 Bab-el-Oued, Algiers, French Algeria
- Died: 1 August 1996 (aged 58) Oran, Algeria
- Education: Université Grenoble Alpes; Le Saulchoir

Sainthood
- Feast day: 1 August
- Venerated in: Roman Catholic Church
- Beatified: 8 December 2018; Notre-Dame de Santa Cruz, Oran, Algeria by Cardinal Giovanni Angelo Becciu

Pierre-Lucien Claverie OP (8 May 1938 – 1 August 1996) was a French Catholic prelate and member of the Order of Preachers who served as Bishop of Oran from 1981 until his murder in 1996 by Islamic extremists.

He was committed to ecumenism and dialogue with the Islamic faith, and dreamed of a peaceful co-existence with Muslims in an independent Algeria. He likewise was noted for his studies on Islamic culture and his mastering of classical Arabic, which he even taught to those Muslims who understood the common popular language rather than its classical origins. Claverie was also a prolific writer on ecumenical dialogue, which he made the core focus of his episcopal life.

Claverie's cause for canonization opened on 31 March 2007 as part of a larger group cause of other religious killed during the course of the Algerian Civil War. Pope Francis confirmed the group's beatification in 2018 and it was celebrated in Oran on 8 December 2018.

== Life ==
=== Education and priesthood ===
Pierre-Lucien Claverie was born as a French citizen in 1938 in a working-class European part of Algiers known as Bab-el-Oued at the time of French Algeria. He was the fourth generation of French settlers and had Algeria as his home. He grew up in a nurturing environment that was raised in the faith, but not all that pious. It was in 1948 that he joined a group of Scouts under the guidance of the Dominicans. Completing his studies at a lycée in Algiers, in 1957 he went to the University of Grenoble in France. Because of the danger, his mother and sister left the department of Alger just prior to independence in 1962, while his father left in February 1963 when he reached retirement.

At Grenoble he was confronted with protests against the French presence in Algeria and realized the limitations of the French world in which he grew up, which he later called "the colonial bubble".

Claverie joined the Dominicans and started his novitiate at the convent in Lille on 7 December 1958. He made his initial vows the next December. He went on to pursue his studies at Le Saulchoir, a Dominican institute near Paris, where he read the works of the Dominicans Yves Congar and Marie-Dominique Chenu. Meanwhile, the war of independence which started in Algeria in 1954 came to an end in 1962 as he underwent his formation and education. Claverie was ordained to the priesthood in 1965. He returned to Algiers from March 1962 to September 1963, in order to finish his mandated time in the armed forces, and worked with chaplains and ran a club for enlisted men; he refused to bear arms. Claverie went back to France and continued his theological studies at Le Saulchoir, being ordained priest in 1965.

He chose to return to Algeria in July 1967 to participate in the rebuilding of this new and independent nation. This idea inspired him, and the galvanized Claverie studied Arabic with the Lebanese Sisters of the Sacred Hearts at their Arabic Pedagogical Institute. Claverie became a noted reference on Islam. From January 1973 to 1981 he ran the Centre des Glycines in Algiers, an institute for the studies of classical Arabic and Islam; the original idea was for the institute to be a place of study for those religious planning to serve in Algeria, but Algerian independence led many Muslims to come the center, eager to study Islamic culture and intent on learning Classical Arabic, since the language of colonization had been French and the language of everyday life had been dialectal Arabic.

=== Relations with Islam ===
Pierre Claverie was a man of dialogue, and he participated in numerous meetings between Christians and Muslims, but was at times critical of formal inter-religious conferences which he felt remained too basic and surface-level. He shunned those meetings, since he believed them to be generators of slogans, and for the glossing over of theological differences. He had such an excellent knowledge of Islam that the people of Oran called him "the Bishop of the Muslims", which was a title that must have pleased him, since he had dreamed of establishing true dialogue among all believers irrespective of faith or creed. Claverie also believed that the Islamic faith was authentic in practice, focusing on people rather than on theories. He said that: "dialogue is a work to which we must return without pause: it alone lets us disarm the fanaticism; both our own and that of the other". He also said that "Islam knows how to be tolerant". In 1974 he joined a branch of Cimade, which was a French NGO dedicated to aiding the oppressed and minorities.

=== Work ===
He was appointed as the Bishop of Oran on 25 May 1981 and was consecrated that October, with Cardinal Léon-Etienne Duval granting him his episcopal consecration. He succeeded Henri Antoine Marie Teissier who had been named as the Archbishop of Algiers. Claverie created libraries and rehabilitation centers for the handicapped as well as educational centers for women. In 1981 he applied for Algerian citizenship.

From 1992 onward - after the Algerian Civil War broke out - the small Catholic Church, which served foreign workers (for the most part), was threatened. There were those in Europe who advised Church officials to leave the nation so as to remain safe. Claverie refused to do so: even if he was never able to obtain Algerian citizenship, he considered himself an Algerian and refused to leave a people to whom his life was linked. During the crisis he also refused to remain silent. Once he deemed it to be necessary, he did not hesitate to publicly criticize the two main opposing forces - the Islamic Salvation Front and the Algerian Government. In 1993 he predicted at a debate that there would be an inevitable trend of migration towards the north in Europe, and that "the face of Europe is going to change".

=== Assassination ===
On 1 August 1996, a few weeks after the assassination of the Trappist monks of Tibhirine, the Bishop was assassinated, along with his driver and friend Mohamed Bouchikhi (1975-1996), when a bomb exploded at the entrance to the bishopric as the two were entering the building just before midnight. He was returning from a trip to Algiers, where he had met with the French Minister of Foreign Affairs Hervé de Charette to talk about French residents of Algeria and how best to keep them safe from the conflict. It was during his funeral that the Muslim mourners described Claverie as "the Bishop of the Muslims".

Seven people were convicted of the killings and sentenced to death on 23 March 1998 for their involvement in the attack. The Catholic Church of Algeria petitioned to have their death sentences commuted, and this appeal was successful. Claverie's assassination proved to be a tremendous shock to the French.

=== Festival d'Avignon ===
Pierre & Mohamed is a play that the Dominican Adrien Candiard wrote. It is based on texts that the bishop had written; Francesco Agnello produced it for the Festival d'Avignon in 2011.

== Beatification ==
The cause for canonization for Claverie - as well as eighteen other religious killed during the war - commenced in Algiers after the diocesan forum was transferred from Oran on 5 July 2006. The official start to the cause came under Pope Benedict XVI on 31 March 2007 after the Congregation for the Causes of Saints issued the official edict of "nihil obstat" (nothing against) to the cause, thus naming the nineteen as Servants of God. The C.C.S. validated the diocesan process on 15 February 2013 when the cause came to Rome for additional investigation. The official Positio dossier was sent to the C.C.S. in 2017.

The current postulator for this cause is the Trappist priest Thomas Georgeon.

On 1 September 2017 the Archbishop of Algiers, Paul Jacques Marie Desfarges, and the Bishop of Oran, Jean-Paul Vesco, met with Pope Francis in a private audience to discuss the cause since theologians had approved the cause at that stage. The pope encouraged the bishops and encouraged the cause to proceed. Francis later confirmed the beatification on 26 January 2018; it was celebrated in Oran on 8 December 2018 with Cardinal Giovanni Angelo Becciu presiding over the celebration on the pope's behalf.

== Writings ==
Below are the texts and various writings that Claverie left:

- Le Livre de la Foi, by Pierre Claverie et les Evêques du Maghreb, Editions du Cerf, Paris 1996.
- Lettres et messages d'Algérie, Editions Karthala, Paris 1996.
- Donner sa vie: Six jours de retraite sur l'Eucharistie, Éditions du Cerf, Paris, 2003.
- Ii est tout de même permis d'être heureux: Lettres familiales 1967-1969, edition presented and annotated by Eric Gustavson, Pierre Claverie's brother-in-law, with the assistance of Anne Catherine Meyer, OP, preface by Jean-Jacques Pérennès, OP, Éditions du Cerf, Paris, 2003.
- Petit traité de la rencontre et du dialogue, Éditions du Cerf, Paris, 2004.
- Je ne savais pas mon nom ... Mémoires d'une religieuse anonyme: presentation by Anne Catherine Meyer, OP, Éditions du Cerf, Paris, 2006.
- Cette contradiction continuellement vécue: Lettres familiales 1969-1975, edition presented and annotated by Eric Gustavson, with the assistance of Anne Catherine Meyer, OP, preface by Jean-Jacques Pérennès, OP, Éditions du Cerf, Paris, 2007.
- Humanité Plurielle, Éditions du Cerf, Paris, 2008.
- Marie la Vivante: Sept jours de retraite avec Marie, presentation by Anne Catherine Meyer, OP, Éditions du Cerf, Paris, 2008.
- Petite introduction à l' Islam, presentation by Anne Catherine Meyer, OP, Éditions du Cerf, 2010.
- Quel bonheur d'être croyant! Vie religieuse en terre algérienne, presentation by Anne Catherine Meyer, OP, Éditions du Cerf, Paris, 2012.
- Là où se posent les vraies questions: Lettres familiales 1975-1981, edition presented and annotated by Eric Gustavson with the assistance of Anne Catherine Meyer, OP, preface by Jean-Jacques Pérennès, OP, Éditions du Cerf, Paris, 2012.
- Prier 15 jours avec Pierre Claverie Evêque d'Oran martyr, Editions Nouvelle Cité, France, 2011.

== Bibliographical references ==
- Jean-Jacques Pérennès, OP, Pierre Claverie. Un Algérien par alliance, préface de Timothy Radcliffe, éd. Cerf, coll. "L'Histoire à vif", Paris, 2000.
- Jean Jacques Perennes, 2007. This book was translated into English with the following title: A life poured out: Pierre Claverie of Algeria, preface by Timothy Radcliffe, OP, Maryknoll, N.Y., Orbis Books, 2007.
