= Callot =

Callot is a French surname. People named Callot include:

- Georges Callot (1857–1903), French genre painter
- Henri Callot (1875–1956), French fencer
- Jacques Callot (c. 1592 – 1635), French printmaker
- Jean-Baptiste-Irénée Callot (1814–1875), French Roman Catholic Bishop

== See also ==
- French submarine Maurice Callot
