= Gaston Marie Jacquier =

French prelate of the Catholic Church in Algeria

The Right Reverend Gaston Marie Jacquier
- Auxiliary Bishop of Algiers
- Church: Roman Catholic Church
- Archdiocese: Algiers
- Appointed: 4 December 1960 by Pope John XXIII
- Term ended: 8 July 1976

Orders
- Ordination: 18 December 1926
- Consecration: 6 March 1961 by Léon-Étienne Duval

Personal details
- Born: 23 February 1904 Évian-les-Bains, France
- Died: 8 July 1976 (aged 72) Algiers, Algeria
- Parents: François Jacquier; Thérèse Chevallay

Ordination history of Gaston Marie Jacquier
History
Episcopal consecration
- Principal consecrator: Léon-Étienne Duval
- Co-consecrators: Emile-Joseph Socquet, M.Afr. Paul Pierre Pinier

Gaston Marie Jacquier (23 February 1904 – 8 July 1976) was a French prelate of the Catholic Church in Algeria. Originally from Évian-les-Bains, France, he moved to French Algeria and was ordained a priest of the Archdiocese of Algiers. In 1960, he was appointed Auxiliary Bishop of Algiers. He participated in all four sessions of the Second Vatican Council. In 1976, he was assassinated with a knife on a street in Algiers.

== Biography ==
Jacquier was born on 23 February 1904 in Évian-les-Bains, Haute-Savoie, France. He was the son of François Jacquier, a merchant, and Thérèse Chevallay. He was educated at Collège Saint-Marie in La Roche-sur-Foron.

He moved to French Algeria and was ordained a priest of the Archdiocese of Algiers on 18 December 1926. Three decades later, in 1956, he was made vicar general of the archdiocese, assisting recently appointed Archbishop Léon-Étienne Duval.

On 4 December 1960, Jacquier was appointed Titular Bishop of Sufasar and Auxiliary Bishop of Algiers by Pope John XXIII. His episcopal ordination took place on 6 March 1961, with Archbishop Duval serving as consecrator. The co-consecrators were Emile-Joseph Socquet, M.Afr., the Archbishop Emeritus of Ouagadougou, and Paul Pierre Pinier, the Bishop of Constantine. The ordination ceremony took place at St Philippe Cathedral (now Ketchaoua Mosque) in Algiers, and was broadcast on Télévision Algérienne.

As auxiliary bishop, Jacquier was well known in the city of Algiers, where he engaged in humanitarian work. From 1962 to 1965, Jacquier participated in all four sessions of the Second Vatican Council. In addition, he served as a co-consecrator of two bishops: André Charles Collini, the coadjutor bishop of Ajaccio, in 1962, and Jean Baptiste Joseph Scotto, the Bishop of Constantine, in 1970.

=== Assassination ===
On Thursday, 8 July 1976, Jacquier was murdered, at age 72, in Algiers when he was stabbed in the street by a young man. The attack took place shortly after noon, while the bishop was walking down the crowded Rue Khelifa Boukhalfa in central Algiers, near the archdiocesan offices and St Charles Church (now El Rahma Mosque). Witnesses reported that the man approached Jacquier, stabbed him several times with a knife, and fled into a car waiting nearby. He was stabbed in the femoral artery in the inner thigh. Jacquier was rushed to the city's main hospital, where he died half an hour later. Two days after the attack, police arrested 26-year-old Abdessalam Abdelkader. The police said that Abdelkader had used a kitchen knife in the attack. They also reported that Abdelkader had a history of mental illness, having been treated several times in psychiatric hospitals.

Although Abdelkader had a history of psychiatric problems, some felt that the attack was religiously motivated. Jacquier was wearing full clerical attire at the time of the attack, including the pectoral cross worn by Catholic bishops. Some also noted that the inner thigh, where an artery is located is an unusual place for a mentally ill person to stab randomly. In addition, the attacker fled quickly into a car that was waiting very close nearby. Following Jacquier's murder, Duval ordered the priests in the Archdiocese of Algiers not to wear the religious habit in public or to display the cross conspicuously. In the years that followed, the archdiocese's churches stopped ringing their bells to avoid inciting Islamic extremist violence.

== Legacy ==
Jacquier's image is included in the fresco on the dome of the Basilica of Notre-Dame d'Afrique in Algiers.

== Episcopal lineage ==
- Cardinal Scipione Rebiba
- Cardinal Giulio Antonio Santorio (1566)
- Cardinal Girolamo Bernerio, OP (1586)
- Archbishop Galeazzo Sanvitale (1604)
- Cardinal Ludovico Ludovisi (1621)
- Cardinal Luigi Caetani (1622)
- Cardinal Ulderico Carpegna (1630)
- Cardinal Paluzzo Paluzzi Altieri degli Albertoni (1666)
- Pope Benedict XIII (1675)
- Pope Benedict XIV (1724)
- Pope Clement XIII (1743)
- Cardinal Gian Francesco Albani (1760)
- Cardinal Carlo Rezzonico (1773)
- Archbishop Antonio Dugnani (1785)
- Archbishop Jean-Charles de Coucy (1790)
- Archbishop Gustave Maximilien Juste de Croÿ-Solre (1820)
- Bishop Charles Auguste Marie Joseph, Count of Forbin-Janson (1824)
- Cardinal Ferdinand-François-Auguste Donnet (1835)
- Archbishop Jean-Emile Fonteneau (1875)
- Bishop Charles-Évariste-Joseph Coeuret-Varin (1885)
- Bishop Joseph Rumeau (1899)
- Bishop Jean-Camille Costes (1924)
- Bishop Auguste-Léon-Alexis Cesbron (1940)
- Archbishop Léon-Étienne Duval (1947)
- Bishop Gaston Marie Jacquier (1961)

== See also ==
- List of people assassinated in Africa
