= Bertrand Lacaste =

French Roman Catholic bishop

- Bishop of Oran
- Church: Catholic Church
- Diocese: Diocese of Oran
- In office: 19 December 1945 – 30 November 1972
- Predecessor: Léon Durand
- Successor: Henri Teissier

Orders
- Ordination: 12 March 1923
- Consecration: 25 March 1946 by Léon-Albert Terrier

Personal details
- Born: 26 June 1897 Accous, Basses-Pyrénées, France
- Died: 20 April 1994 (aged 96)

Bertrand Lacaste (born 26 June 1897 in Accous – 20 April 1994) was a French clergyman and bishop for the Roman Catholic Diocese of Oran. He was ordained in 1923. He was appointed bishop in 1945. He died on 20 April 1994, at the age of 96.
