= Antoine-Adolphe Dupuch =

French priest

The Most Reverend Antoine-Adolphe Dupuch
- Bishop, Roman Catholic Archdiocese of Algiers
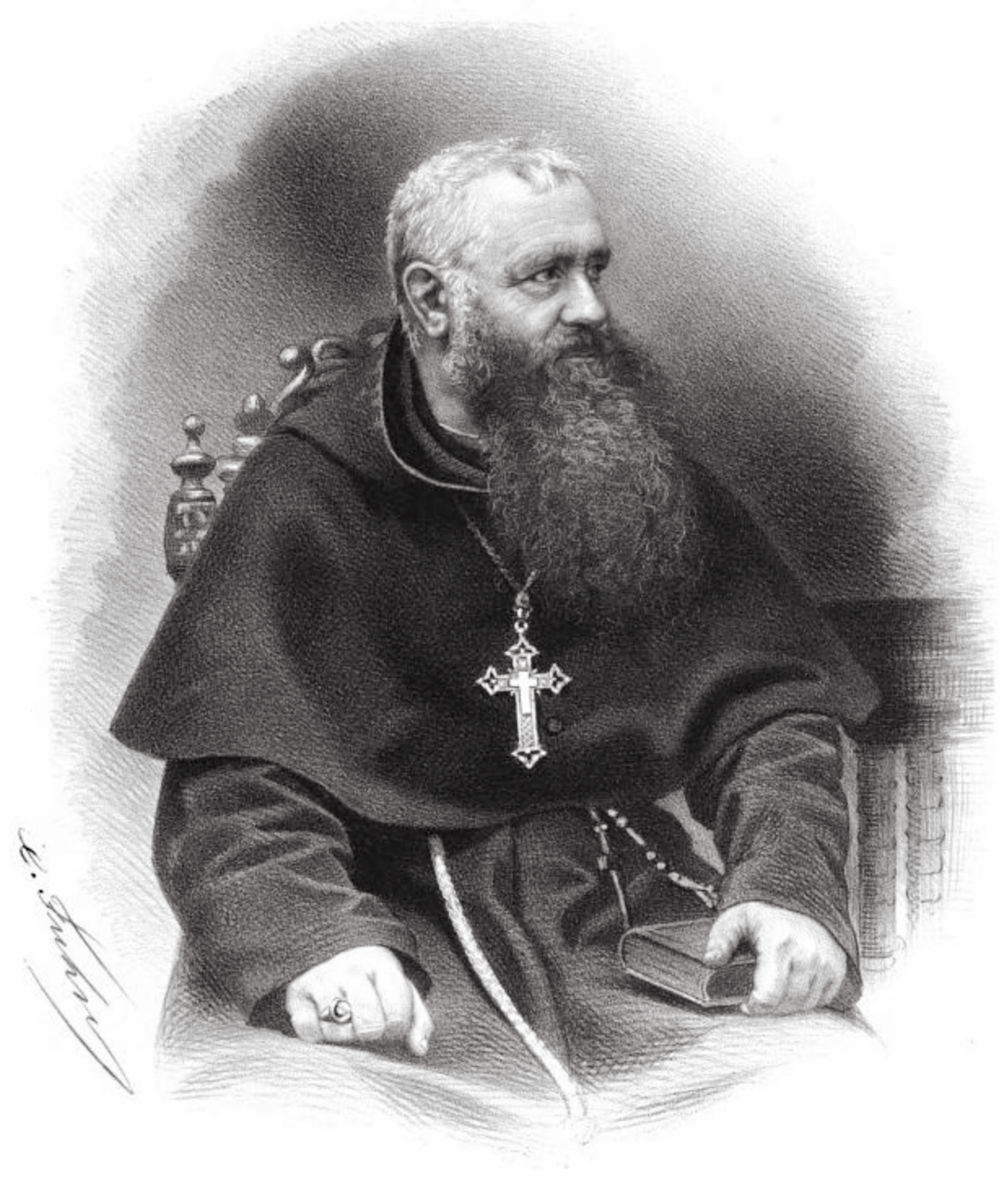
- Antoine-Adolphe Dupuch (1800–1856), first-ever Bishop of Algiers.
- Church: Roman Catholic
- See: Algiers
- Appointed: 1838
- Term ended: 1845
- Successor: Louis-Antoine-Augustin Pavy

Orders
- Ordination: 1825

Personal details
- Born: 22 May 1800 Bordeaux, France
- Died: July 11, 1856 (aged 56) Bordeaux, France
- Denomination: Catholic

Antoine-Louis-Adolphe Dupuch (1800-1856) was a French Catholic priest who served as the first Bishop of Algiers from 1838 to 1845. He attempted to evangelise the local Arab population and built nearly 60 new churches in Algeria.

== Early life ==
Antoine-Adolphe Dupuch was born on May 22, 1800, in Bordeaux, France.

== Career ==
Dupuch was ordained as a priest by the Roman Catholic Archdiocese of Bordeaux in 1825.

Dupuch served as the first Bishop of Algiers from 1838 to 1845. He was initially appointed to cater to the French colonists who lived in Algeria and ensure they led righteous lives. However, Dupuch felt called by God to restore Christianity in Algeria. Indeed, he believed Arabs had been Christians before they were forced to convert to Islam. He also believed Algeria could be used as a springboard to rechristianise the entire continent of Africa.

Dupuch's views on evangelisation clashed with official doctrine of the French Army under Governor-General Thomas Robert Bugeaud, who feared the Arabs might feel disrespected and rebel. He also clashed with Emily de Vialar and expelled her Sisters of St. Joseph of the Apparition from Algeria; the order focused on evangelising Tunisia instead.

Meanwhile, Dupuch helped build churches across Algeria. By 1846, he had paid for the construction of 60 new churches, chapels and oratories in French Algeria, out of his own pocket. However, he was forced to resign as bishop as he went into debt.

Dupuch was the author of several books about Christianity in French Algeria and Africa. He wrote two books about Abdelkader El Djezairi.

== Death ==
Dupuch died on July 11, 1856.

== Works ==
- Dupuch, Antoine-Adolphe (1842). Lettre pastorale de l'évêque d'Alger. Algiers. OCLC 558686986.
- Dupuch, Antoine-Adolphe (1847). Essai sur l'Algérie chretienne, romaine et française ou extraits de quelques-uns des sommaires de la traduction de l'Africa christiana de Morcelli annoté et augmenté. Turin. OCLC 249106804.
- Dupuch, Antoine-Adolphe (1849). Abd-el-Kader au château d'Amboise. Bordeaux: Imprimerie de H. Faye. OCLC 457413515.
- Dupuch, Antoine-Adolphe (1849–1850). Fastes sacrés de l'Afrique chrétienne. Bordeaux: H. Faye. OCLC 38567348.
- Dupuch, Antoine-Adolphe (1856). Venez avec moi à La Salette. Nantes: Charpentier. OCLC 457413579.
- Dupuch, Antoine-Adolphe (1860). Abd-el Kader : Sa vie intime, sa lutte avec la France, son avenir. Bordeaux: Lacaze. OCLC 493227699.
