= St. Mary's Cathedral, Oran =

St. Mary's Cathedral
- Cathédrale Sainte Marie
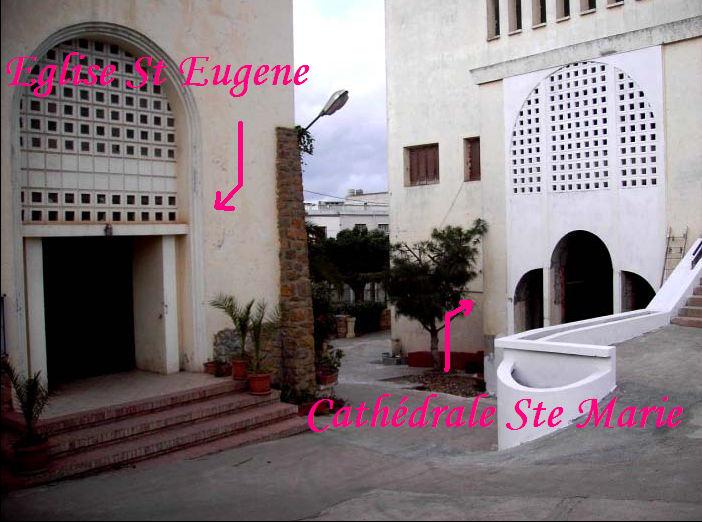
- St. Mary's Cathedral
- Location: Oran
- Country: Algeria
- Denomination: Roman Catholic Church

Architecture
- Architectural type: church

Administration
- Diocese: Diocese of Oran

The St. Mary's Cathedral (French: Cathédrale Sainte Marie) or simply Cathedral of Oran, is a Roman Catholic church in Oran, Algeria.

The cathedral is specifically located in the sector of St Eugene. It was the parish church of the neighborhood. The edifice was constructed in the 1960s in lieu of another unfinished church building. During the 1980s, the Sacred Heart Cathedral, a much larger building, was delivered by Bishop Claverie to the Algerian authorities. The seat of the bishop was then transferred to the crypt of the Church of St. Mary. It was completely renovated in 2012.

== See also ==
- Roman Catholicism in Algeria
