= Sacro Cuore di Gesù agonizzante a Vitinia =

Church of the Sacred Heart of Jesus in Agony in Vitinia
- Chiesa del Sacro Cuore di Gesù agonizzante a Vitinia (in Italian); Sacratissimi Cordis Iesu in agoniam facti (in Latin); Dambana ng Kabanal-banalang Puso ni Hesus na Nagdurusa sa Vitinia (in Tagalog)
- Click on the map for a fullscreen view
- 41°47′28.17″N 12°24′25.6″E
- Location: Via Sant'Arcangelo di Romagna 70, Rome
- Country: Italy
- Denomination: Roman Catholic
- Tradition: Roman Rite
- Website: Official website

History
- Status: Titular church
- Dedication: Sacred Heart of Jesus
- Consecrated: 1955

Architecture
- Architect: Ildo Avetta
- Architectural type: Church
- Style: Modernist

The Church of the Sacred Heart of Jesus in Agony in Vitinia (Italian: Sacro Cuore di Gesù agonizzante a Vitinia, Latin: Sacratissimi Cordis Iesu in agoniam facti) is a Roman Catholic titular church in Rome, built as a parish church by decree of Cardinal Clemente Micara. On 30 April 1969 Pope Paul VI granted it a titular church as a seat for Cardinals.

The actual suburb is called Vitinia, the first one westwards on the Via del Mare after the Circonvallazione Meridionale.

The cardinalate title, created in 1969, is Sacro Cuore di Gesù Agonizzante a Vitinia, and the most recent titular is Jean-Paul Vesco. The dedication is to the Sacred Heart of Jesus in Agony.

It was designed by Ildo Avetta, and opened in 1955. The floor plan is basically rectangular with a shallowly curved apse, but the shape of the building is complex. The entrance façade is dominated by a white parabola, decorated with four rows of unusually shaped windows resembling stretched animal skins arranged vertically (the four curves making up each shape are also parabolic). These windows increase in overall size and proportional length from top row to bottom, and the rows number two, three, four and five. The parabola is bounded by two pink brick walls which slope backwards from the two corners of the overall façade, creating voids either side of the parabola, and it also has a floating canopy either side of its apex covering these voids.

The side walls of the church are strongly zig-zag, with six triangular projections running from ground to roof on each side in the same pink brick, with small square windows inserted into the otherwise blank wall in an array shaped like a parallelogram on each of the overall twenty-four faces of this arrangement. The roof has a shallow downward curve on either side of the major axis, over these projections, and over the nave is shaped as a result like a row of six and a half lozenges (the half is the canopy over the entrance parabola). At the altar end, the roof forms an irregular hexagon stretched transversely and with the angle behind the altar smoothed away by the apse curve. The walls here are all blank brick, but the roof forms three shallow parabolas, a large one over the apse and two smaller ones on the shorter side faces of the hexagon. These three voids are filled by stained glass.

There is a detached campanile to the right of the altar end. It is an octagonal brick tower, with small square windows inserted in one vertical row on each face. The bellchamber is of concrete, formed of eight parabolic arches.

== List of Cardinal Priests ==
- Julio Rosales y Ras (30 April 1969 – 2 June 1983)
- Mario Luigi Ciappi (22 June 1987 – 23 April 1996)
- Telesphore Placidus Toppo (21 October 2003 – 4 October 2023)
- Jean-Paul Vesco (7 December 2024 –)
