= Léon-Étienne Duval =

French Catholic cardinal (1903–1996)

His Eminence Léon-Étienne Duval
- Archbishop of Algiers
- Church: Catholic Church
- Archdiocese: Algiers
- Appointed: 3 February 1954
- Term ended: 19 April 1988
- Predecessor: Auguste-Fernand Leynaud
- Successor: Henri Teissier
- Previous post: Bishop of Constantine (1946–1954)

Orders
- Ordination: 18 December 1926
- Consecration: 11 February 1947 by Auguste Cesbron
- Created cardinal: 22 February 1965 by Pope Paul VI

Personal details
- Born: 9 November 1903 Chênex, Haute-Savoie, France
- Died: 30 May 1996 (aged 92) Algiers, Algeria
- Buried: Basilica of Our Lady of Africa, Algiers, Algeria
- Education: Pontifical French Seminary
- Motto: Latin: In caritate omnia (In Love of All Things)

Léon-Étienne Duval (9 November 1903 – 30 May 1996) was a French prelate and cardinal. He served as Archbishop of Algiers from 1954 to 1988, and was elevated to the cardinalate in 1965.

== Biography ==
Styles of Léon-Étienne Duval
- Reference style: His Eminence
- Spoken style: Your Eminence
- Informal style: Cardinal
- See: Algiers (emeritus)

Léon-Étienne Duval was born in Chênex, Haute-Savoie, France, and attended the seminary in Annecy before going to Rome, where he studied alongside Marcel Lefebvre at the Pontifical French Seminary. Ordained to the priesthood on 18 December 1926, he then did pastoral work in Annecy until 1942, whilst teaching at the seminary and serving as Director of Works. During World War II, Duval supported the French Resistance and was wary of the Vichy regime. He was an honorary canon and vicar general of Algiers from 1942 to 1946.

On 3 November 1946 Duval was appointed Bishop of Constantine by Pope Pius XII. He received his episcopal consecration on 11 February 1947 from Bishop Auguste Cesbron, with Bishops Raoul Harscouêt and Léon Terrier serving as co-consecrators. Duval was later named Archbishop of Algiers on 3 February 1954.

Duval championed the independence of Algeria, and encouraged peace among Muslims, Christians, and Jews. In early 1962, he denounced the urban warfare that occurred during the Algerian War as "an offense against God," to the anger of the pieds-noirs of his flock, who subsequently called him "Mohammed Duval." He participated in the Second Vatican Council from 1962 to 1965. Duval, assisted by Cardinals Julius Döpfner and Raúl Silva Henríquez, delivered one of the closing messages of the Council on 8 December 1965. He also served as President of the North African Episcopal Conference from 1963 to 1988. He was opposed to Action Française, which supported establishing Catholicism as the state religion, because he believed that faith and politics should remain separate. Duval was a schoolmate of the Traditionalist Archbishop Marcel Lefebvre, and in August 1976, Duval urged him to fully submit himself to the authority of the pope.

Pope Paul VI created him cardinal-priest of S. Balbina in the consistory of 22 February 1965. Duval was one of the cardinal electors who participated in the conclaves of August and October 1978, which selected Popes John Paul I and John Paul II respectively. He occupied Room 86 at the cardinal electors' residence for the August 1978 conclave, sharing a shower with Leo Suenens, Raúl Silva Henríquez, and Juan Ricketts.

Following the public murder of his auxiliary bishop, Gaston Marie Jacquier, in 1976, Duval ordered his priests in the Archdiocese of Algiers not to wear the religious habit in public or to display the cross conspicuously. In the years that followed, the archdiocese's churches stopped ringing their bells to avoid inciting Islamic extremist violence.

Because of his humanitarian and anti-imperialist works, the Duval was chosen by the Revolutionary Council as one of four clergymen who would visit the hostages held in the American embassy in Tehran on Christmas Day 1979. On 19 April 1988 he resigned as Algiers' archbishop, after thirty-four years of service.

Duval died in Algiers, at age 92. He is buried in the Basilica de Notre-Dame d’Afrique of that same city. Following his death, John Paul II remarked that, "He will remain a light and an encouragement on a long and difficult road at a moment in which the Christian community in Algeria is facing testing times".

== Episcopal lineage ==
- Cardinal Scipione Rebiba
- Cardinal Giulio Antonio Santorio (1566)
- Cardinal Girolamo Bernerio, OP (1586)
- Archbishop Galeazzo Sanvitale (1604)
- Cardinal Ludovico Ludovisi (1621)
- Cardinal Luigi Caetani (1622)
- Cardinal Ulderico Carpegna (1630)
- Cardinal Paluzzo Paluzzi Altieri degli Albertoni (1666)
- Pope Benedict XIII (1675)
- Pope Benedict XIV (1724)
- Pope Clement XIII (1743)
- Cardinal Gian Francesco Albani (1760)
- Cardinal Carlo Rezzonico (1773)
- Archbishop Antonio Dugnani (1785)
- Archbishop Jean-Charles de Coucy (1790)
- Archbishop Gustave Maximilien Juste de Croÿ-Solre (1820)
- Bishop Charles Auguste Marie Joseph, Count of Forbin-Janson (1824)
- Cardinal Ferdinand-François-Auguste Donnet (1835)
- Archbishop Jean-Emile Fonteneau (1875)
- Bishop Charles-Évariste-Joseph Coeuret-Varin (1885)
- Bishop Joseph Rumeau (1899)
- Bishop Jean-Camille Costes (1924)
- Bishop Auguste-Léon-Alexis Cesbron (1940)
- Archbishop Léon-Étienne Duval (1947)

Catholic Church titles
| Preceded by Emile-François Thiénard | Bishop of Constantine; 1946–1954 | Succeeded by Paul-Joseph Pinier |
| Preceded by Auguste-Fernand Leynaud | Archbishop of Algiers; 1954–1988 | Succeeded by Henri Antoine Marie Teissier |
