= Diocese of Oran =

The Diocese of Oran may refer to:

- Roman Catholic Diocese of Oran, Algeria
- Roman Catholic Diocese of Orán, Argentina
