= Paul Desfarges =

Algerian bishop

The Most Reverend Paul Jacques Marie Desfarges S.J.
- Archbishop Emeritus of Algiers
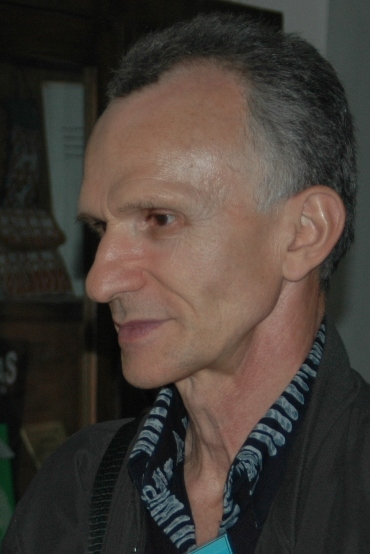
- Desfarges in 2021
- Church: Roman Catholic Church
- Archdiocese: Algiers
- See: Algiers
- Appointed: 24 December 2016
- Installed: 10 February 2017
- Term ended: 27 December 2021
- Predecessor: Ghaleb Moussa Abdalla Bader
- Successor: Jean-Paul Vesco
- Other post: President of the North African Regional Episcopal Conference (2015-)
- Previous posts: Bishop of Constantine (2008-16); Apostolic Administrator of Algiers (2015-16)

Orders
- Ordination: 14 June 1975
- Consecration: 12 February 2009 by Ghaleb Moussa Abdalla Bader
- Rank: Archbishop

Personal details
- Born: Paul Jacques Marie Desfarges; 7 May 1944 (age 82) Saint-Etienne, Loire, France
- Motto: Ta volonté soit faite ("Your will be done")

Paul Jacques Marie Desfarges (born 7 May 1944) is a retired French-Algerian Jesuit priest who served as the Archbishop of Algiers from 2016 to 2021.

== Career ==
Desfarges arrived in Algeria in 1965 for military service. He taught as a civilian in a White Fathers school in Ghardaia.

Returning to France, he decided to become a Jesuit and joined the novitiate on 14 October 1967. After his vows as religious, and theological studies, he was ordained a priest on 14 June 1975. He made his solemn profession on 30 April 1981.

Desfarges then spent nearly 30 years in Constantine, where, among other subjects, he taught psychology at the university from 1976 to 2006. In 1982, he obtained Algerian citizenship.

Beginning in 2006, he headed the spiritual center Ben Smen to Algiers, while the upper Algiers Jesuit community.

Pope Benedict XVI appointed him Bishop of Constantine and Hippo on 21 November 2008. He succeeded Bishop Gabriel Piroird, who retired for reasons of age. Desfarges was consecrated on 12 February 2009 and installed as the bishop of Constantine eight days later.

On 24 December 2016 Pope Francis named Desfarges the Archbishop of Algiers. He submitted his resignation when he reached the mandatory retirement age of 75 and his resignation was accepted by Francis 27 December 2021.
