= Louis-Antoine-Augustin Pavy =

French Catholic bishop (1805–1866)

His Eminence Louis-Antoine-Augustin Pavy
- Bishop, Roman Catholic Archdiocese of Algiers
- Church: Roman Catholic
- See: Algiers
- Appointed: 1846
- Term ended: 1866
- Predecessor: Antoine-Adolphe Dupuch
- Successor: Charles Lavigerie

Orders
- Ordination: 1829

Personal details
- Born: 18 March 1805
- Died: 16 July 1866 (aged 61)
- Denomination: Roman Catholic

Louis-Antoine-Augustin Pavy (1805–1866) was a French Catholic prelate who served as the second Bishop of Algiers from 1846 to 1866. He attempted to convert the Arabs to Catholicism. He denounced socialism, rampant among French colonists, as the work of the devil.

== Biography ==
=== Early life ===
Louis-Antoine-Augustin Pavy was born on 13 March 1805.

=== Career ===
Pavy was ordained as a priest in 1829. He served as the second Bishop of Algiers from 1846 to 1866. During his tenure, he was responsible for the construction of Notre Dame d'Afrique in Algiers.

Like his predecessor, he attempted to convert the Arabs to Catholicism. His 1850 request to evangelise the Arabs in villages across the Constantine Province was denied by the Minister of War, who feared they would feel disrespected. Undaunted, he gave speeches denouncing Islam from his pulpit in Algiers.

Meanwhile, Pavy made sure to cater to the French colonists who lived in Algiers. He was especially fearful of their growing adherence to socialism, which he compared to the devil.

In 1863, Pavy suggested that it was easier to preach in small towns than large cities, where spiritualism had become a problem. However, he did not see freemasonry as mutually incompatible with Catholicism.

=== Death ===
Pavy died on 16 July 1866, at the age of 61.

== Works ==
- Pavy, Louis-Antoine-Augustin (1836). Les Cordeliers de l'Observance à Lyon, ou l'église et le couvent de ce nom, depuis leur fondation jusqu'à nos jours. Lyon. OCLC 950775138.
- Pavy, Louis-Antoine-Augustin (1851). Lettres sur le célibat ecclésiastique à M. le lieutenant-général, comte d'Hautpoul, gouverneur-général de l'Algérie. Algiers: Librairie universelle de Bastide. OCLC 551327061.
- Pavy, Louis-Antoine-Augustin (1856). Mandements, Instructions, Lettres Pastorales et Discours. OCLC 503615135.
- Pavy, Louis-Antoine-Augustin (1858). Histoire critique du culte de la Sainte Vierge en Afrique depuis le commencement du Christianisme jusqu'à nos jours. Algiers: Bastide. OCLC 759619511.
- Pavy, Louis-Antoine-Augustin (1859). Touchante histoire d'une mère et de ses trois enfants. Algiers. OCLC 503615208.
- Pavy, Louis-Antoine-Augustin (1860). Esquisse d'un traité sur la souveraineté temporelle du pape. Algiers: Bastide. OCLC 422279453.
- Pavy, Louis-Antoine-Augustin (1863). Lettre circulaire et Ordonnance... sur la superstition dite spiritisme. Algiers: Bastide. OCLC 461079394.
