= Jean-Paul Vesco =

French archbishop

His Eminence Jean-Paul Vesco OP
- Cardinal, Archbishop of Algiers
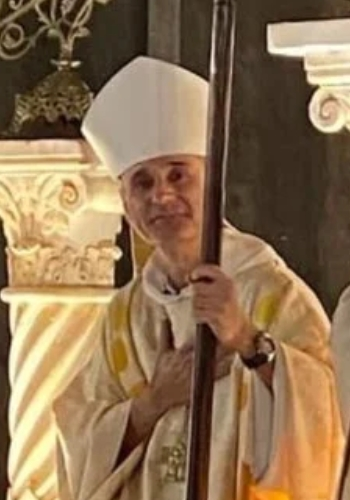
- Church: Catholic Church
- Archdiocese: Algiers
- Appointed: 27 December 2021
- Predecessor: Paul Desfarges
- Other post: Cardinal-Priest of Sacro Cuore di Gesù agonizzante a Vitinia (2024–)
- Previous post: Bishop of Oran (2012–21)

Orders
- Ordination: 24 June 2001
- Consecration: 25 January 2013 by Philippe Barbarin
- Created cardinal: 7 December 2024 by Francis
- Rank: Cardinal priest

Personal details
- Born: Jean-Paul Vesco; 10 March 1962 (age 64) Lyon, Rhône, France

Jean-Paul Vesco, OP (French pronunciation: [ʒɑ̃pɔl vɛsko]; born 10 March 1962) is a Franco-Algerian cardinal of the Catholic Church who serves as the Archbishop of Algiers. He has spent most of his clerical career in Algeria and was Bishop of Oran from 2012 to 2021. He is a member of the Dominicans and headed the French Dominicans from 2010 to 2012. He was made a cardinal on 7 December 2024 by Pope Francis.

== Biography ==
Jean-Paul Vesco was born on 10 March 1962 in Lyon. After earning a degree in jurisprudence, he practiced law in Lyon for seven years before joining the Dominicans in 1995, taking his vows on 14 September 1996. Vesco was ordained a priest of the Dominican order on 24 June 2001. His uncle, Jean-Luc Vesco (1934–2018), also a Dominican, was a biblical scholar who headed the École Biblique from 1984 to 1991 and led the Dominican province of Toulouse from 1976 to 1984. After studies at the École Biblique in Jerusalem, he moved to Tlemcen, Algeria, in the Diocese of Oran on 6 October 2002. This assignment reestablished the Dominican presence in that diocese six years after the assassination of its bishop, Pierre Claverie. From 2005 to 2010 he was vicar general of the diocese and from 2007 to 2010 he was also diocesan treasurer. On 16 October 2007 he was elected head of the Dominicans in Tlemcen.

In December 2010, Vasco was elected Prior Provincial of the Dominicans in France and took up his duties in Paris on 11 January 2011.

On 1 December 2012, Pope Benedict XVI appointed him bishop of Oran. He received his episcopal consecration on 25 January 2013 in the Cathedral of Oran from Cardinal Philippe Barbarin, Archbishop of Lyon, assisted by Ghaleb Moussa Abdalla Bader, archbishop of Algiers and Alphonse Georger, bishop Emeritus of Oran.

In 2015, he called for the Church to re-evaluate its treatment of divorced Catholics who remarry, writing: "The church's discipline regarding divorced and remarried couples has long troubled me, even revolted me, because of the unnecessary suffering it inflicts on individuals without consideration for their unique situations."

Among his sensitive assignments was the organization of celebrations in 2018 to mark the beatification of 19 Algerian martyrs.

On 27 December 2021, Pope Francis appointed Vesco archbishop of Algiers.

On 27 February 2023, President Abdelmadjid Tebboune granted Vesco Algerian citizenship by presidential decree.

On 6 October 2024, Pope Francis announced that he planned to make Vesco a cardinal on 8 December, a date that was later changed to 7 December.

On 7 December 2024, Pope Francis made him a cardinal, assigning him as a member of the order of cardinal priests the title of Sacro Cuore di Gesù agonizzante a Vitinia.

In 2022, he said he expects to live in Algeria for the rest of his life. When he learned he was being made a cardinal he said: "I am the pastor of this church, which seeks to be a bridge, to foster fraternity, and to connect with all humanity. I don’t think being made a cardinal will distance me from Algiers and Algeria. On the contrary, this appointment will root me here even more."

Vesco participated as a cardinal elector in the 2025 papal conclave that elected Pope Leo XIV.

== See also ==
- Catholic Church in Algeria
- Cardinals created by Pope Francis
