= Roman Catholic Diocese of Oran =

Roman Catholic diocese in Algeria

Coordinates: 35°41′N 0°37′W

Diocese of Oran Dioecesis Oranensis

catholic
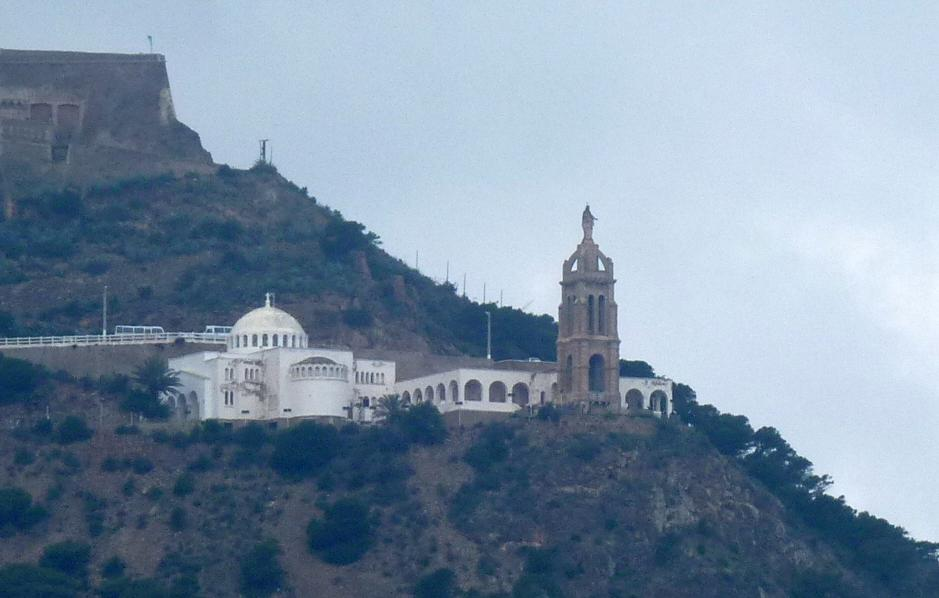
- Santa Cruz Church.

Location
- Country: Algeria
- Ecclesiastical province: Algiers
- Metropolitan: Oran

Statistics
- Area: 77,353 km^{2} (29,866 sq mi)
- Population: Total; Catholics: (as of 2021); 10,322,520; 1,560 (0.0%)
- Parishes: 6

Information
- Denomination: Catholic Church
- Rite: Roman
- Established: 25 July 1866
- Cathedral: St. Mary's Cathedral, Oran
- Secular priests: 2 (Diocesan); 8 (Religious Orders)

Current leadership
- Pope: Leo XIV
- Bishop: Davide Carraro, P.I.M.E.
- Metropolitan Archbishop: Jean-Paul Vesco
- Bishops emeritus: Alphonse Émile Georger

Map
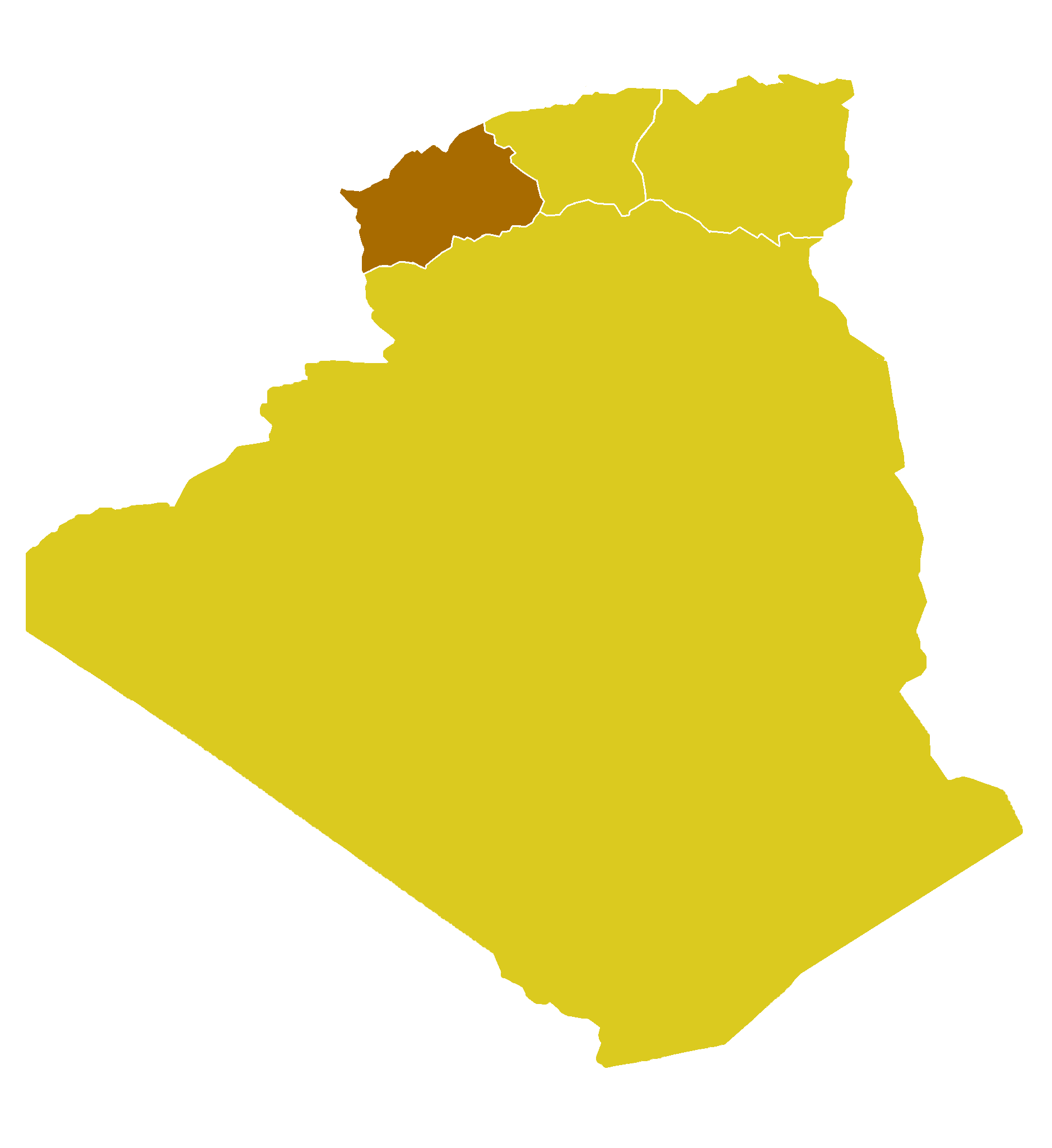

The Roman Catholic Diocese of Oran (French: Diocèse d'Oran, Latin: Dioecesis Oranensis) is a Roman Catholic diocese in the ecclesiastical province of Algiers in Algeria.

== History ==
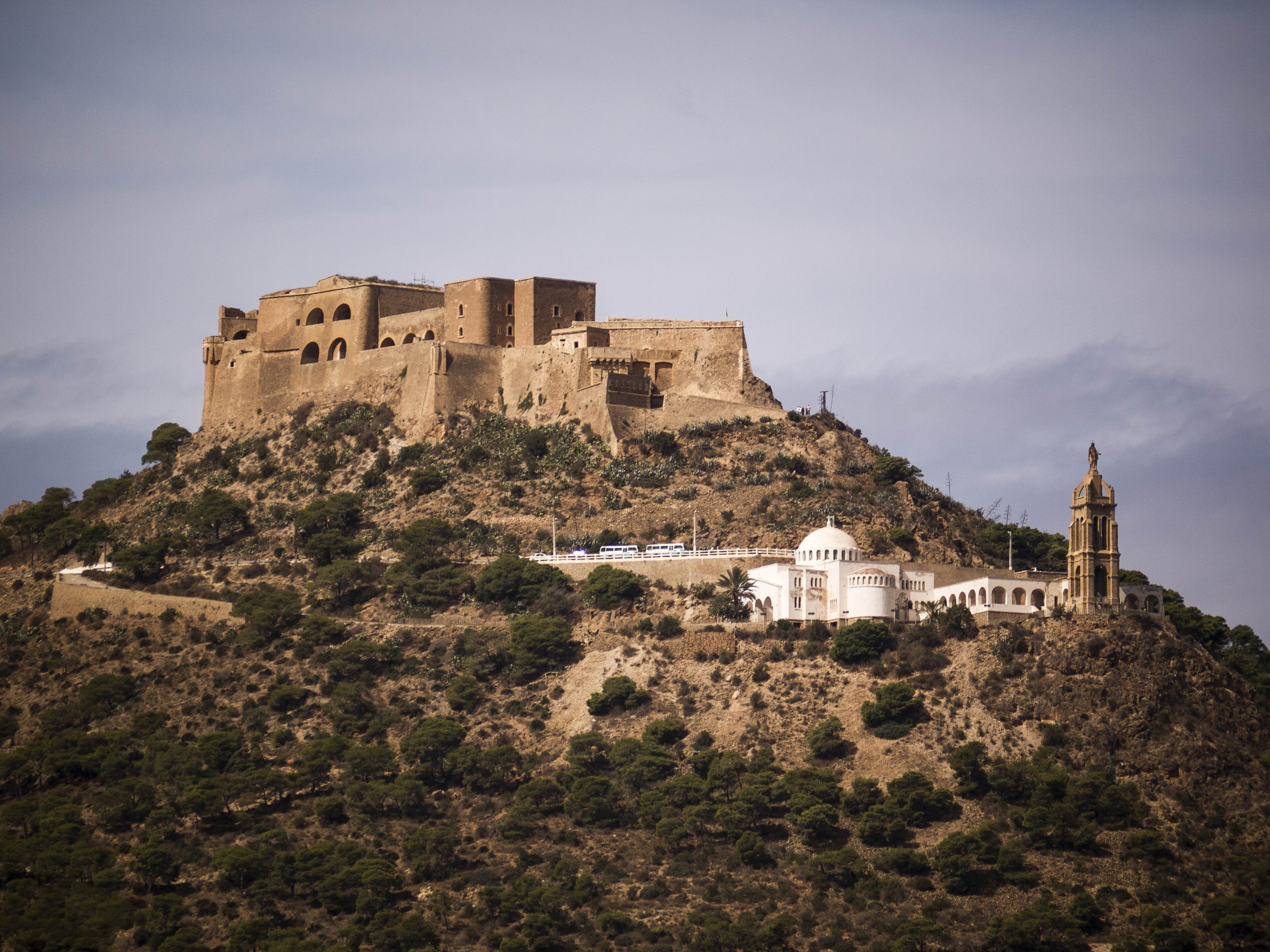
The Church with Santa Cruz Fort.

The current diocese of Oran was created on 25 July 1866, with the diocese of Constantine, by dismemberment of the single diocese of Algiers (established in 1838). It is limited to the east by the Archdiocese of Algiers, to the south by the Diocese of Laghouat, to the west by the border of Morocco; it covers nearly 56,000 km^{2} (22,000 sq mi). It is believed that its current population is around 9.8 million inhabitants spread over 9 departments, of which 1,500 are Catholic. At the time of Saint Augustine, about thirty bishoprics existed on the current extent of the diocese; from the 16th to the 18th centuries.

Oran, occupied by the Spaniards between 1509 and 1792, depended on the Archbishop of Toledo despite attempts to create a local diocese there (at the time of Cardinal Francisco Jiménez de Cisneros, there was a conflict with a Franciscan, Luis Guillen, who had obtained a papal bull recognizing him as bishop of Oran)..

After the massive departure of the French at the independence of Algeria in 1962, then of foreign workers at the beginning of the Algerian Civil War, the Catholic community only has a few hundred members nowadays. Pierre Claverie, bishop of Oran between 1981-1996, was murdered together with a Muslim assistant by a bomb that had been planted at the door of the bishopric.

== Special churches ==
The seat of the bishop is Cathédrale Sainte-Marie in Oran.

== Ordinaries ==
=== Bishops of Oran ===
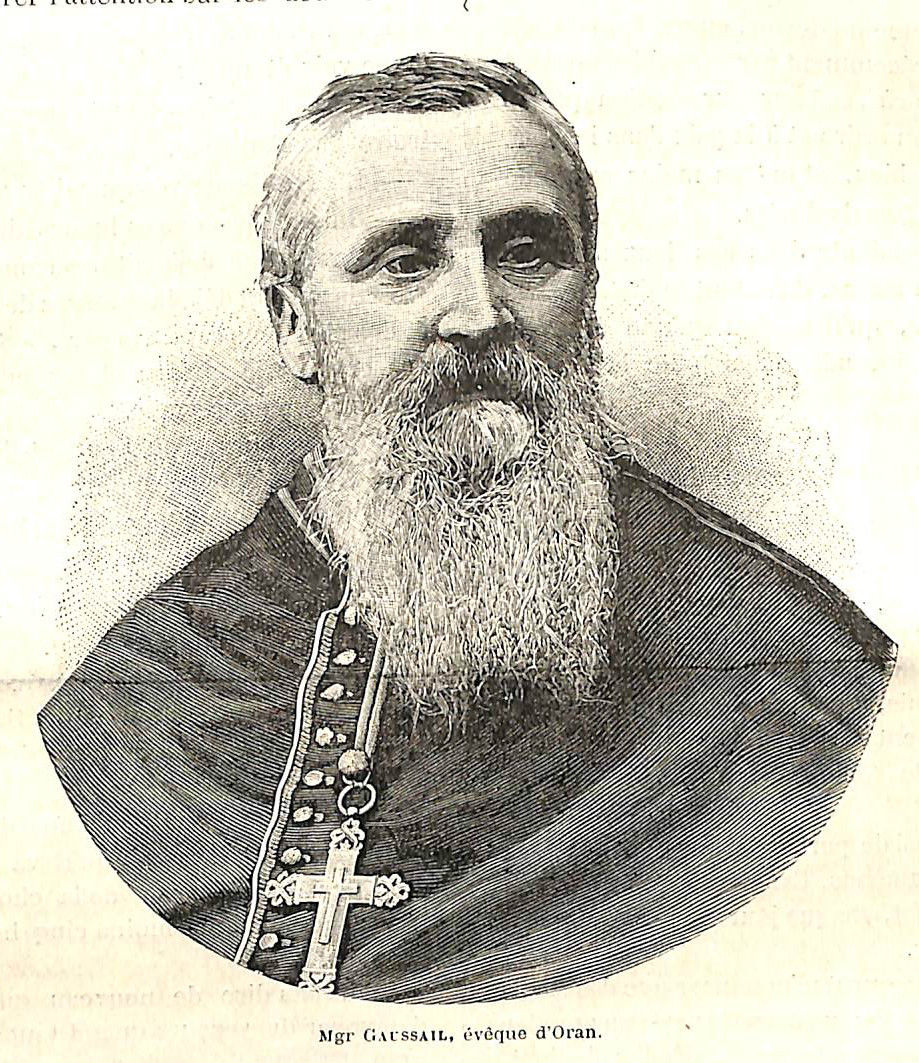
Bishop Gaussail of Oran, 1884

1. Jean-Baptiste-Irénée Callot (12 January 1867 – 1 November 1875)
2. Louis-Joseph-Marie-Ange Vigne (1 March 1876 – 27 February 1880), appointed Bishop of Digne, France
3. Pierre-Marie-Etienne-Gustave Ardin (12 February 1880 – 27 March 1884), appointed Bishop of La Rochelle and Saintes, France
4. Noël-Mathieu-Victor-Marie Gaussail (10 January 1884 – 10 June 1886), appointed Bishop of Perpignan-Elne, France
5. Géraud-Marie Soubrier (2 March 1886 – 24 March 1898)
6. Edouard-Adolphe Cantel (8 July 1898 – 10 December 1910)
7. Pierre-Firmin Capmartin (19 February 1911 – 25 December 1914)
8. Christophe-Louis Légasse (6 December 1915 – 13 August 1920), appointed Bishop of Périgueux (-Sarlat), France
9. Léon-Auguste-Marie-Joseph Durand (11 October 1920 – 20 March 1945)
10. Bertrand Lacaste (29 December 1945 – 30 November 1972)
11. Henri Teissier (30 November 1972 – 20 December 1980), appointed Coadjutor Archbishop of Alger
12. Pierre Lucien Claverie, OP (25 May 1981 – 1 August 1996)
13. Alphonse Georger (10 July 1998 – 1 December 2012)
14. Jean-Paul Vesco, OP (1 December 2012 – 27 December 2021, appointed Archbishop of Alger and is current administrator of Oran)
