= Jean-Baptiste-Irénée Callot =

French Roman Catholic priest (1814–1875)

His Eminence Jean-Baptiste-Irénée Callot
- Bishop, Roman Catholic Diocese of Oran
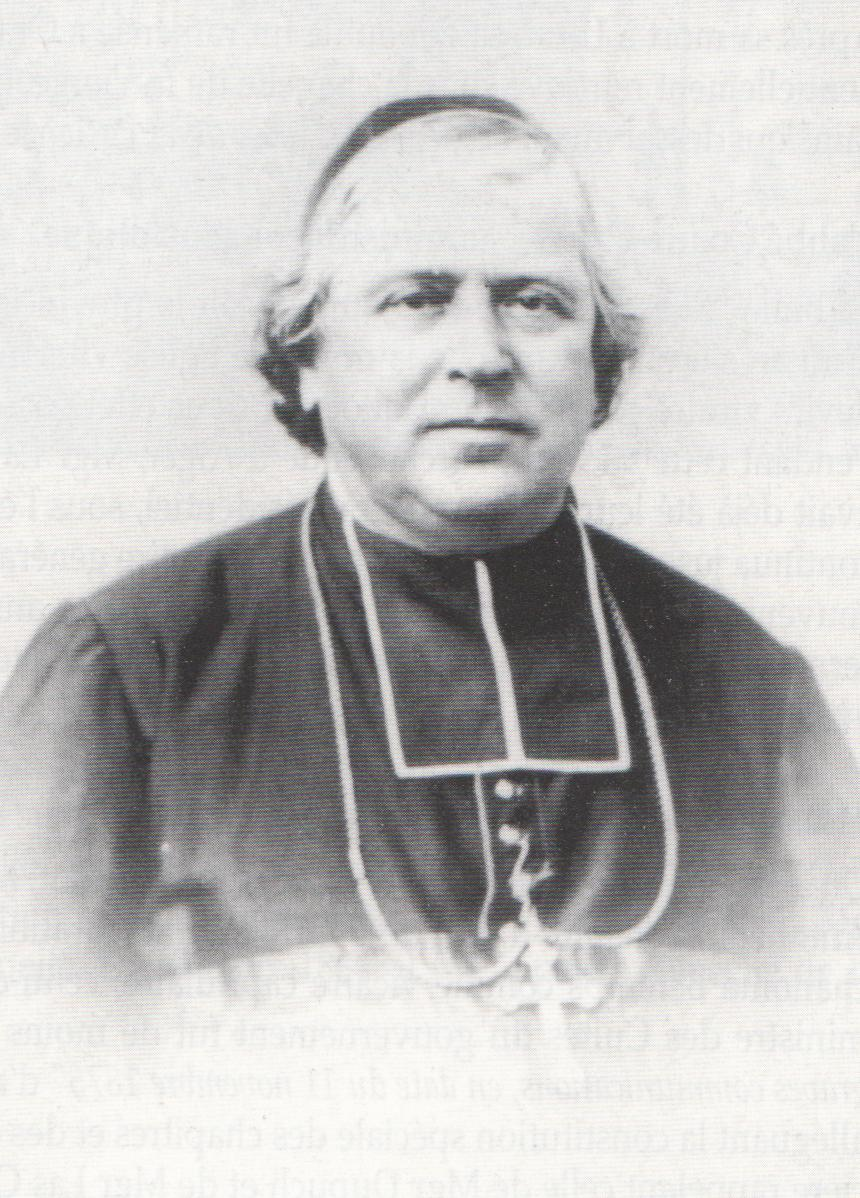
- Church: Roman Catholic
- See: Oran
- Appointed: 1867
- Term ended: 1875
- Successor: Louis-Joseph-Marie-Ange Vigne

Orders
- Ordination: 1838

Personal details
- Born: 22 November 1814 Beaujeu, Rhône, France
- Died: 1 November 1875 (aged 60) Beaujeu, Rhône, France
- Denomination: Roman Catholic

Jean-Baptiste-Irénée Callot (1814–1875) was a French Roman Catholic priest. He served as the first Bishop of Oran in Oran, French Algeria from 1867 to 1875.

== Early life ==
Jean-Baptiste-Irénée Callot was born on 23 November 1814 in Beaujeu, Rhône, France.

== Vocation ==
Callot was a Professor of Theology at the University of Lyon.

Callot was appointed as the vicar of the Saint Irenaeus Church in Lyon in 1856. He served as the first Bishop of Oran in Oran, French Algeria from 1867 to 1875.

== Death ==
Callot died on 1 November 1875 in Beaujeu, France.
