= Gabriel Piroird =

French-born Algerian Roman Catholic prelate (1932–2019)

Gabriel Piroird, Institute of Prado
- Bishop of the Diocese of Constantine
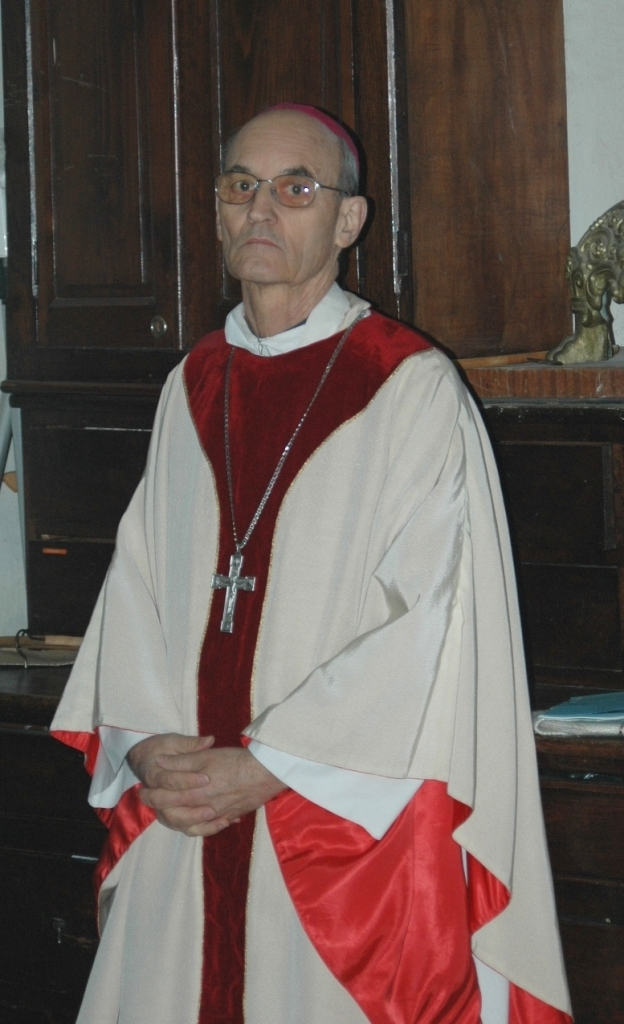
- Church: Roman Catholic Church
- See: Roman Catholic Diocese of Constantine
- Appointed: 25 March 1983
- In office: 1983–2008
- Predecessor: Jean Scotto
- Successor: Paul Desfarges

Orders
- Ordination: 27 June 1964
- Consecration: 3 June 1983 by Jean Scotto

Personal details
- Born: Gabriel Jules Joseph Piroird; 5 October 1932 Lyon, France
- Died: 3 April 2019 (aged 86) Écully, France

Gabriel Jules Joseph Piroird, Institute of Prado (5 October 1932 – 3 April 2019) was a French-born Algerian Roman Catholic prelate who served as the fourteenth Diocesan Bishop of the Roman Catholic Diocese of Constantine from 25 March 1983 until his retirement on 21 November 2008.

== Biography ==
Gabriel Piroird was born in Lyon and as a young person joined a secular institute of the Institute of the Priests of Prado, founded by Blessed Antoine Chevrier. He was ordained a priest on 27 June 1964, after completing his philosophical and theological education.

Piroird worked as a missionary in Algeria from 1968, after encountering Algerian emigrants in his native Lyon. Upon his arrival, he served as pastor of Béjaïa, in Kabylie, and as an engineer in the administration of the hydraulics of the wilayah (prefecture).

On 25 March 1983, after retirement of his predecessor, he was appointed bishop of the Roman Catholic Diocese of Constantine. He was consecrated to the Episcopate on 3 June 1983. The principal consecrator was Bishop Jean Scotto with other prelates of the Roman Catholic Church.

Piroird served until his retirement on 21 November 2008. He returned to France, where he died on 3 April 2019.

Catholic Church titles
Preceded by Jean Scotto	Diocesan Bishop of Constantine; 1983–2008	Succeeded by Paul Desfarges
