= Alphonse Georger =

French and Algerian Catholic bishop

His Eminence Alphonse Georger
- Bishop emeritus, Roman Catholic Diocese of Oran
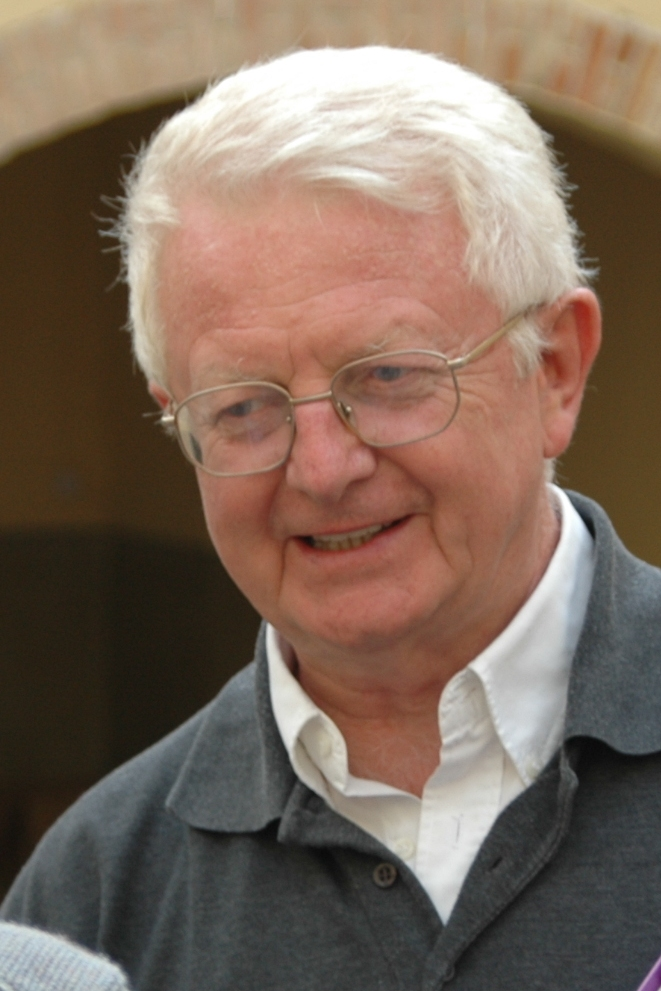
- Church: Roman Catholic
- See: Oran
- Appointed: 1998
- Term ended: 2012
- Predecessor: Pierre Claverie
- Successor: Jean-Paul Vesco

Orders
- Ordination: 1965

Personal details
- Born: 25 May 1936 Sarreguemines, Moselle, France
- Denomination: Roman Catholic

Alphonse Georger (born 25 May 1936 in Sarreguemines, Moselle) is a French and Algerian Catholic bishop and an Emeritus Bishop of the Roman Catholic Diocese of Oran in Algeria since December 2012.

== Bibliography ==
Alphonse Georger was ordained priest Catholic priest on 29 June 1965 in the Roman Catholic Archdiocese of Algiers. He got Algerian nationality in 1977.

Georger was appointed Bishop of the Roman Catholic Diocese of Oran on 10 July 1998 by Pope John Paul II and he was consecrated to the episcopate on 16 August 1998 by Archbishop Joseph Duval, Archbishop of Roman Catholic Archdiocese of Rouen.

Retiring on grounds of age in 2012, his successor, the Dominican Jean-Paul Vesco, was appointed on 1 December 2012 and was ordained bishop on 25 January 2012. Monsignor Georger accordingly became an emeritus bishop.

== Publications ==
- A seminarian Journal in Algeria, 1960-1962, Cana, 2003.
