= Henri Teissier =

French archbishop (1929–2020)

Henri Antoine Marie Teissier
- The Most Reverend
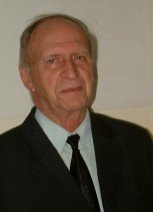
- Church: Roman Catholic Church
- Archdiocese: Algiers
- Appointed: 19 April 1988
- Retired: 24 May 2008
- Predecessor: Léon-Étienne Duval
- Successor: Ghaleb Moussa Abdalla Bader
- Other post: Coadjutor Bishop of Algiers (1980-1988)
- Previous post: Bishop of Oran (1973-1980)

Orders
- Ordination: 24 March 1955 by Léon-Étienne Duval
- Consecration: 2 February 1973 by Léon-Étienne Duval

Personal details
- Born: Henri Antoine Marie Teissier; July 21, 1929 Lyon, France
- Died: December 1, 2020 (aged 91)

Henri Antoine Marie Teissier (21 July 1929 – 1 December 2020) was a French-Algerian Catholic Bishop of Algiers and Archbishop Emeritus of Algiers.

== Biography ==
Teissier was born in Lyon and ordained as priest by Diocese of Algiers on 24 May 1955. On 30 November 1972, aged 43, he was appointed by Pope Paul VI Bishop of Oran. He received episcopal consecration on 2 February 1973. On 20 December 1980 he was appointed coadjutor to the archbishop Cardinal Duval in Algiers. In 1988, Cardinal Duval withdrew and Teissier became Archbishop of Algiers.

He had been living in Algeria since 1948 and obtained Algerian citizenship in 1966. Tessier was a member of the Secretariat for relations with non-Christians (1971), as Vice-President of the Arab Caritas International for the country (1975–1987) he was a Muslim-Christian at various symposia and conferences of the two Christians in Palestine involved. Teissier was President of the Conference of Bishops of North Africa from 1982 to 2004.

He is regarded as one of the authoritative representatives of ecumenism between Christianity and Islam. He remained firm in this position despite 19 murders of non-Muslim religious people which occurred between 1994 and 1996. During this period Pierre Claverie, the Bishop of the Roman Catholic Diocese of Oran, was killed and the assassination of the monks of Tibhirine took place.

When John Paul II named two cardinals in pectore in 1998, (Note: The in pectore cardinals were in John Paul's 2001 consistory revealed as Marian Jaworski and Jānis Pujāts.) Margaret Hebblethwaite suspected Teissier might have been one of those, saying that

...[Teissier's] life could be in great danger if he were made a cardinal

Other sources, though, never believed either of the in pectore cardinals to be Teissier, and in 2001 it would be revealed he was not one of them.

=== Legion of Honor ===
On 24 May 2008 Pope Benedict XVI accepted his retirement. He was replaced by Father Ghaleb Moussa Abdalla Bader from Latin Patriarchate of Jerusalem. In 2008 he was appointed a knight of the Legion of Honor for his many honorable and peaceful works. Teissier was nominated on 23 September 2009 by Pope Benedict XVI as a member of the Second Special Assembly of the synod for Africa.

=== Awards ===
- Knight of the Legion of Honor (July 2007)

== Publications ==
- Church in Islam, Éditions du Centurion, 1984
- The Mission of the Church, Desclee de Brouwer, 1985
- History of Christian North Africa, Desclee de Brouwer, 1991, in collaboration
- Letters from Algeria, Bayard-Centurion, 1998
- Christians in Algeria, sharing hope, Desclée de Brouwer, 2002

== See also ==
- List of French bishops
- Christianity in Algeria

== Sources ==
- Martine de Sauto, Henri Teissier, a bishop in Algeria, Bayard, 2006 ((ISBN 2227471514))
