= Ghaleb Moussa Abdalla Bader =

20th-century Jordanian Catholic bishop

His Excellency, The Most Reverend Ghaleb Moussa Abdallah Bader
- Apostolic Nuncio Emeritus to Dominican Republic and Apostolic Delegate Emeritus to Puerto Rico; Titular Archbishop of Mathara in Numidia
- Appointed: 24 August 2017
- Retired: 15 February 2023
- Predecessor: Jude Thaddeus Okolo
- Successor: Piergiorgio Bertoldi
- Other post: Titular Archbishop of Mathara in Numidia
- Previous posts: Apostolic Nuncio to Pakistan (2015–17); Archbishop of Algiers (2008–15)

Orders
- Ordination: 13 June 1975 by Neemah Simaan
- Consecration: 17 July 2008 by Fouad Boutros Twal, Michel Sabbah and Henri Teissier

Personal details
- Born: 22 July 1951 (age 74) Khirbeh, Jordan
- Denomination: Catholic Church
- Motto: CONFIRMA FRATRES TUOS

Styles of Ghaleb Moussa Abdalla Bader
- Reference style: His Excellency; The Most Reverend
- Spoken style: Your Excellency
- Religious style: Archbishop

Ghaleb Moussa Abdalla Bader (Arabic: غالب موسى عبد الله بدر; born 22 July 1951) is a Jordanian prelate of the Catholic Church who served as the apostolic nuncio to the Dominican Republic and apostolic delegate to Puerto Rico. He was Archbishop of Algiers from 2008 to 2015.

== Biography ==
Ghaleb Moussa Abdalla Bader was born in Al Khirbeh, Jordan, on 22 July 1951. He entered the minor seminary of Beit Jala on 4 September 1963.

Bader was ordained a priest by Neemah Simaan, Auxiliary Bishop of Jerusalem and Patriarchal Vicar for Jordan, on 13 June 1975 in Jabal al-Luweibdeh, Amman. His first assignment was as parish priest of Christ the King parish in Al-Misdar in central Amman.

In August 1979 Bader became secretary to the Patriarch of Jerusalem and professor at the seminary of Beit Jala.

Bader earned a doctorate in civil law from Damascus University in 1979 and then attended the Lateran Pontifical University in Rome where he earned a doctorate degree in philosophy in 1985 and a doctorate in church and civil law in 1986. He is the author of several books and speaks seven languages.

From 1981 to 1986 Bader participated in the Arabic translation of the 1983 Code of Canon Law.

From 1996 to 2001 Bader worked as an advisor to the Pontifical Council for Interreligious Dialogue.

On 24 May 2008, Pope Benedict XVI appointed Bader Metropolitan Archbishop of Algiers. He was the first Arab Catholic priest to hold that office, previously held by Frenchmen.

Bader received his episcopal consecration on 17 July 2008 from the Latin Patriarch of Jerusalem Fouad Twal, with co-consecrators Patriarch Emeritus Michel Sabbah and Archbishop Henri Teissier.

== Diplomatic career ==
Pope Francis appointed him Apostolic Nuncio to Pakistan on 23 May 2015. He was the first native of Jordan to hold the rank of papal nuncio.

Bader was appointed Apostolic Nuncio to the Dominican Republic and Apostolic Delegate to Puerto Rico on 24 August 2017.

On 15 February 2023, Pope Francis accepted his resignation.

== See also ==
- List of heads of the diplomatic missions of the Holy See
