= Jean-Charles de Coucy =

French ecclesiastic

His Grace Jean-Charles de Coucy
- Archbishop of Reims, Peer of France
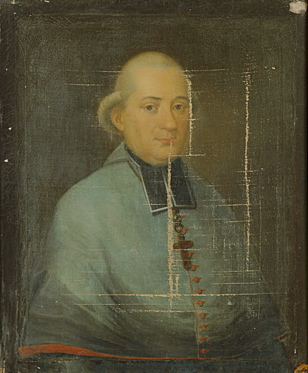
- Church: Roman Catholic Church
- Archdiocese: Reims
- See: Notre-Dame de Reims
- Installed: 1 October 1817
- Term ended: 9 March 1824
- Predecessor: Alexandre-Angélique de Talleyrand-Périgord
- Successor: Jean-Baptist-Marie-Anne-Antoine de Latil
- Other posts: Bishop of La Rochelle; Vicar-General of Reims

Personal details
- Born: 23 September 1746 Château d'Écordal, Rethel, Ardennes, France
- Died: 9 March 1824 (aged 77) Reims, France
- Coat of arms

Jean-Charles de Coucy (born on 23 September 1746 at the Château d'Écordal, died on 9 March 1824 in Reims) was an ecclesiastic who was Archbishop of Reims.

== Early life ==
Jean-Charles de Coucy was born on 23 September 1746 at the Château d'Écordal in the Rethelois (Ardennes). From the family of the lords of Coucy in Champagne, he was appointed Queen's Chaplain by Patent of January 28, 1776. Then he became canon of Reims. At the moment when the Revolution began, he was the Vicar-General of the Archbishop of Reims, Bishop de La Roche-Aymon.

== Career ==
He was appointed bishop of La Rochelle by Louis XVI on 23 October 1789 and his appointment was confirmed by Pius VI on 14 December. The seat was almost immediately suppressed, on 12 November 1789, by the Civil Constitution of the clergy. The dioceses were redrawn to correspond to the division of the departments, and that of La Rochelle was broken up. His monarchist convictions led him to exile in Spain. As early as 1791 he saw a difficult emigration. Based in Guadalajara, he organized a mutual assistance fund between exiles and solicited the financial support of the Spanish upper clergy.

He refused his resignation to Pius VII in 1801, which contributed the schism of the Little Church of the Two Sèvres. Refractory to the civil constitution of the clergy, he was also resistant to the Concordat of 1801. A significant part of his clergy followed him and turned to resistance. His letters from the exile, false or authentic, maintained the movement of resistance in the parishes. Dissenting parish priests were either displaced or tolerated. In 1803, on a report from Dupin, Prefect of the Deux-Sèvres, Bonaparte requested the King of Spain to arrest Coucy and he was subsequently imprisoned until 1807, at the instigation of Abbé Émery and Archbishop Fesch.

Returning to France in 1814, he assured his vicars general he had not authored any letters since 1804. During the Hundred Days he accompanied King Louis XVIII to Ghent. In 1816, he gave his resignation of the bishopric of La Rochelle to the king and was appointed to the prestigious title of Archbishop of Reims on August 8, 1817, as a reward for his fidelity to the Bourbons. In 1819, he publicly disapproved of the movement of the Little Church, of which persists to this day. He was created a peer of France on 31 October 1822 and died in Reims on 9 March 1824.
