= Archdiocese of Algiers =

Roman Catholic archdiocese in Algeria

Coordinates: 36.7674°N 3.0544°E

Archdiocese of Algiers Archidioecesis Algeriensis Archidiocèse de Alger
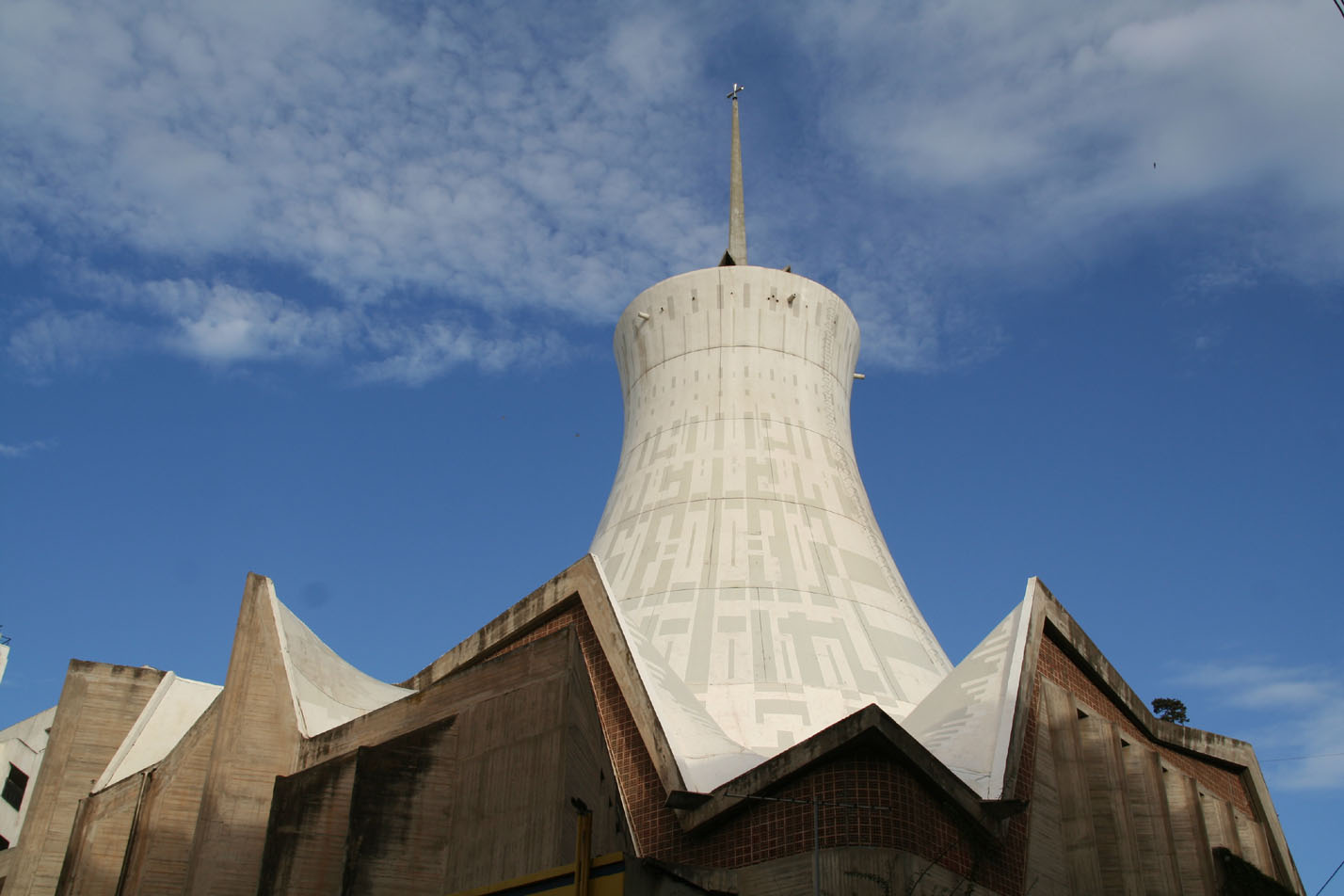
- Cathédrale du Sacré-Cœur d'Alger

Location
- Country: Algeria
- Ecclesiastical province: Algiers
- Metropolitan: Algiers

Statistics
- Area: 54,900 km^{2} (21,200 sq mi)
- Population: Total; Catholics: (as of 2022); 12,470,000; 4,000 (0.0%)
- Parishes: 9

Information
- Denomination: Catholic Church
- Rite: Roman
- Established: August 10, 1838
- Cathedral: Cathédrale du Sacré-Cœur d'Alger, Algiers
- Secular priests: 9 (Diocesan); 26 (Religious Orders)

Current leadership
- Pope: Leo XIV
- Archbishop: Jean-Paul Vesco; Archbishop of Algiers
- Metropolitan Archbishop: Jean-Paul Vesco
- Suffragans: Diocese of Constantine; Diocese of Oran

Map
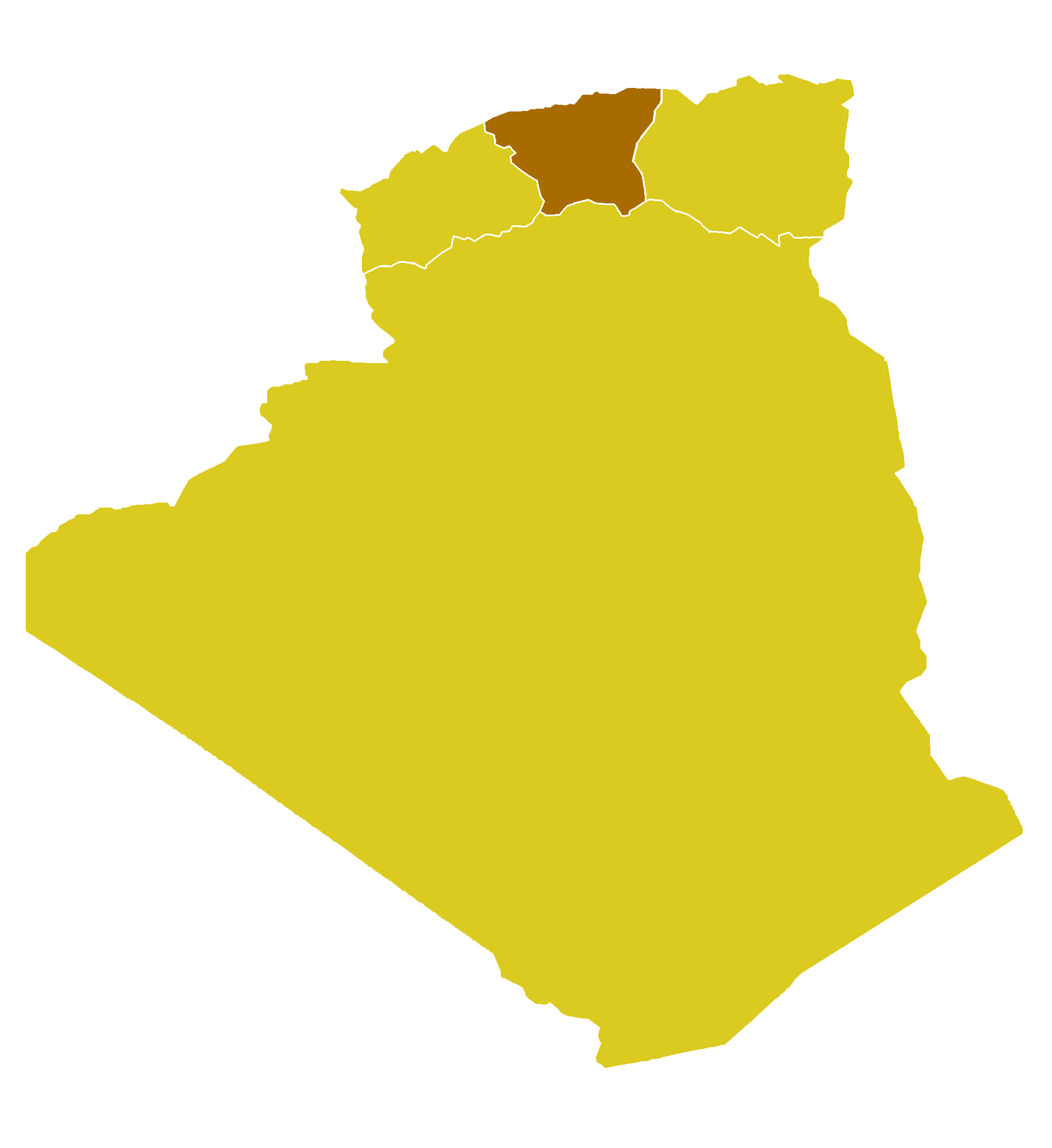

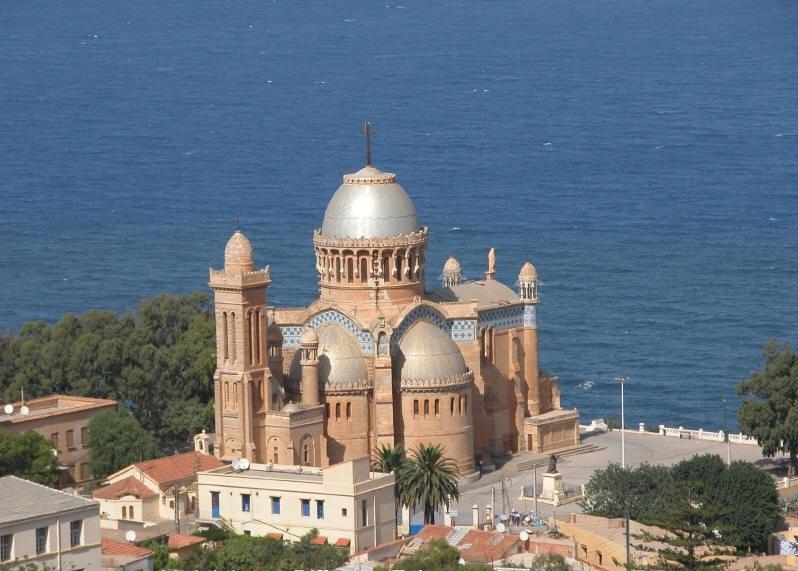
The basilica of Notre Dame d'Afrique in Algiers

The Archdiocese of Algiers (Latin: Archidioecesis Algeriensis, French: Archidiocèse de Alger) is the metropolitan see for the ecclesiastical province of Algiers in Algeria.

== History ==
The diocese was established on 10 August 1838 as the Diocese of Algiers from Diocese of Islas Canarias in Spain. Later that same year, it united with the Diocese of Iulia Caesarea.

It was promoted to the Metropolitan Archdiocese of Algiers on 25 July 1866.

== Special churches ==
La Cathédrale du Sacré-Cœur d'Alger (Sacred Heart Cathedral of Algiers) is the current cathedral of the archdiocese. It is a concrete Modernist church that was built in 1956. It became a cathedral in 1962.

The previous cathedral was the French colonial Cathedral of St. Philip of Algiers. The Cathedral of St. Philip of Algiers was established by converting the Ketchaoua Mosque in 1845, but was reconverted to the Ketchaoua Mosque in 1962.

The diocese also has a Minor Basilica at the Basilique de Notre Dame d'Afrique in Algiers.

== Bishops ==
=== Apostolic Vicars of Algiers ===
1. Philippe le Vacher, CM (1651 – 17 July 1662)
2. Benjamin Huguier, CM (1662 – April 1663)
3. Jean Le Vacher, CM (23 May 1668 – 29 July 1683)
4. Michel de Montmasson, CM (8 January 1685 – 5 July 1688)
5. José Gianola, O.SS.T (1690–1693)
6. Yves Laurence, CM (September 1693 – 11 March 1705)
7. Lambert Duchêne, CM (1705 – December 1736)
8. Pierre Favoux, CM (1737 – 15 July 1740)
9. Adrien Poissant, CM (22 July 1740 – 1 June 1741)
10. Charles-Marie-Gabriel Poirier du Burgh, CM (June 1741 – July 1743)
11. Adrien Poissant, CM (July 1743 – 3 August 1746)
12. Arnoult Bossu, CM (3 August 1746 – 1757)
13. Théodore Groiselle, CM (30 November 1757 – 5 September 1763)
14. Charles la Pie de Savigny, CM (5 September 1763 – April 1765)
15. Philippe Joseph Le Roy, CM (April 1765 – 1772)
16. Charles la Pie de Savigny, CM (1772 – April 1773)
17. Pierre François Viguier, CM (April 1773 – 28 May 1778)
18. Charles Cosson, CM (20 October 1778 – 11 February 1782)
19. Michel Ferrand, CM (20 March 1782 – 2 May 1784)
20. Jean-Alasia Erat, CM (20 January 1785 – 5 April 1798)
21. Jean-Claude Vicherat, CM (1798–1802)
22. Jean-François Chossat, CM (March 1823 – June 1825)
23. Jean-Louis Solignac, CM (1825–1827)

=== Bishops of Algiers ===
1. Antoine-Adolphe Dupuch (13 September 1838 – 9 December 1845)
2. Louis-Antoine-Augustin Pavy (16 April 1846 – 16 November 1866)

=== Archbishops of Algiers ===
1. Charles Lavigerie (27 March 1867 – 25 November 1892), elevated to Cardinal in 1882
2. Prosper Auguste Dusserre (26 November 1892 – 30 December 1897)
3. Fédéric-Henri Oury (28 November 1898 – 15 December 1907)
4. Barthélemy Clément Combes (22 January 1909 – 2 January 1917)
5. Auguste-Fernand Leynaud (2 January 1917 – 5 August 1953)
6. Léon-Étienne Duval (3 February 1954 – 19 April 1988), elevated to Cardinal in 1965
7. Henri Antoine Marie Teissier (19 April 1988 – 24 May 2008)
8. Ghaleb Moussa Abdalla Bader (24 May 2008 – 23 May 2015), appointed nuncio and titular Archbishop
9. Paul Desfarges, SJ (24 December 2016 – 27 December 2021)
10. Jean-Paul Vesco (27 December 2021 – present)

=== Coadjutor archbishops ===
- Prosper Auguste Dusserre (1880–1892)
- Henri Antoine Marie Teissier (1980–1988)

=== Auxiliary bishops ===
- Pierre-Jean-Joseph Soubiranne (22 December 1871 – 27 February 1880), appointed Bishop of Belley, France
- Salvator-Alexandre-Félix-Carmel Brincat (28 June 1889 – 1903)
- Alexandre Piquemal (26 February 1909 – 4 June 1920)
- Paul Pierre Pinier (13 December 1947 – 27 March 1954), appointed Bishop of Constantine (-Hippone)
- Gaston Marie Jacquier (4 December 1960 – 8 July 1976)

=== Other bishops who were priests of the diocese ===
This list contains men, living and deceased, who were priests of this diocese before becoming bishops elsewhere.

- Victor-Félix Bernadou (priest: 19 December 1840 – 7 April 1862), appointed Bishop of Gap, France; future Cardinal
- Alphonse Émile Georger (priest: 29 June 1965 – 10 July 1998), appointed Bishop of Oran
- Henri Antoine Marie Teissier (priest: 24 March 1955 – 30 November 1972)), appointed Bishop of Oran (later returned here as Coadjutor)

== See also ==
- List of Catholic dioceses in Algeria

== Sources ==
- GCatholic.org
