= Fort of Santa Cruz (Oran) =

Fortifications in Algeria

- Oran, Algeria
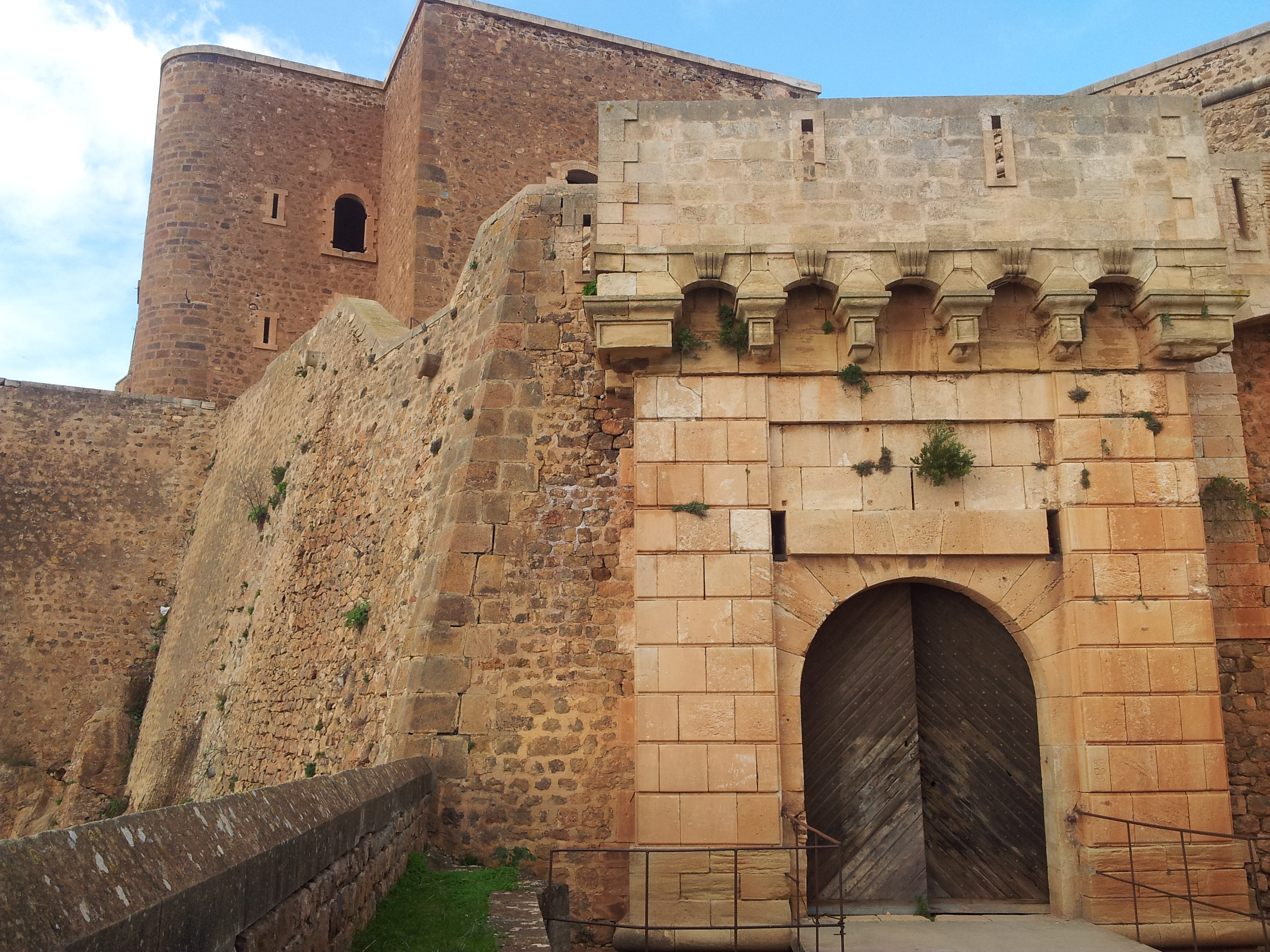
- Entrance to the Fort of Santa Cruz

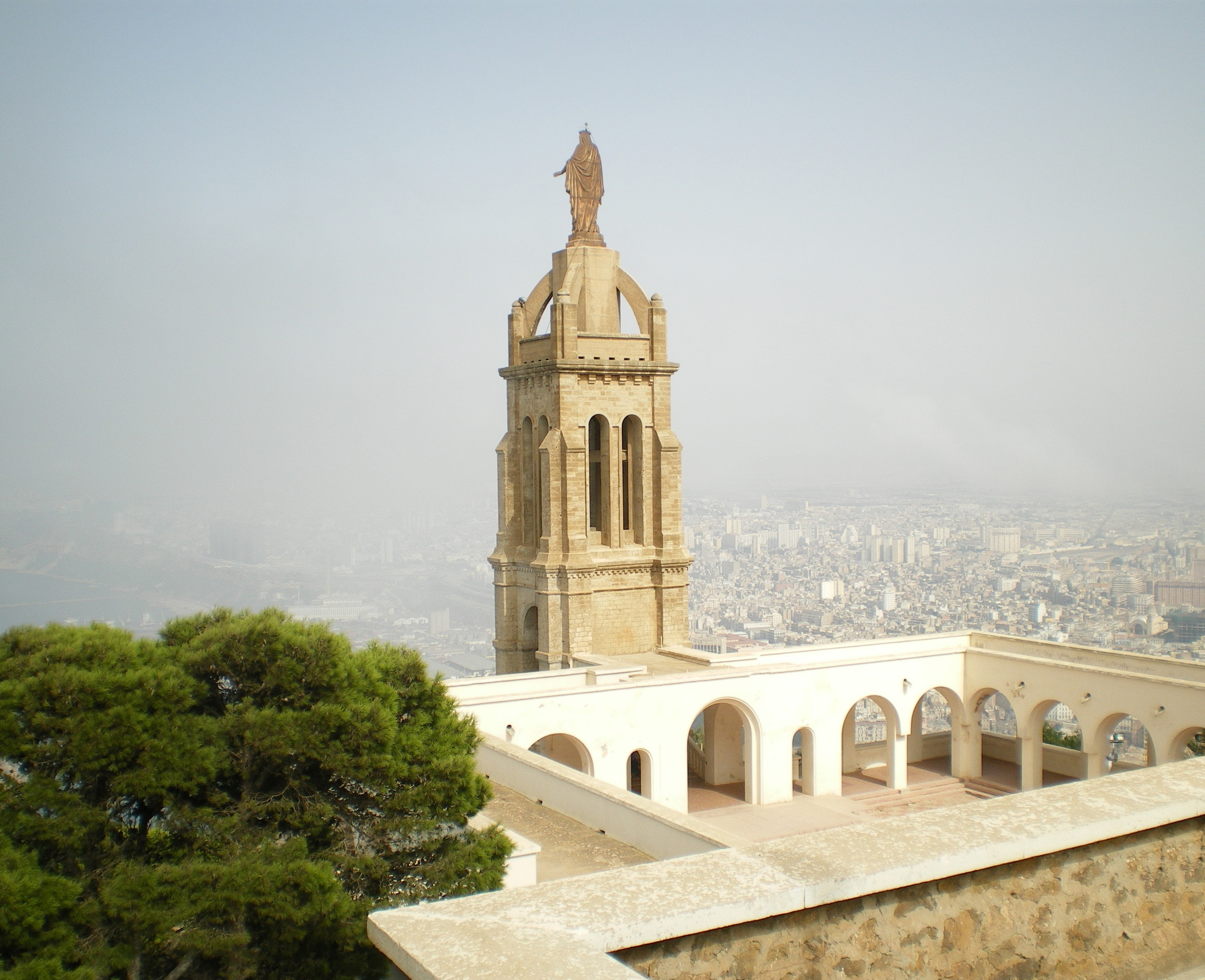
- Notre-Dame de Santa Cruz

Site information
- Type: Fort
- Controlled by: Government of Algeria
- Open to the public: Yes

Location
- Coordinates: 35.707026°N 0.665374°W

Site history
- Built: Seventeenth century
- Built by: Ottomans and Spaniards
- Materials: Stone and brick
- Battles/wars: Ottomans, Spaniards and French

Fort of Santa Cruz is a fort in Oran, the second largest port city of Algeria. It is one of Oran's three forts; the other two forts are Fort de la Moune at the western end of the port and Fort Saint-Philippe, a replacement of the old castle of the Saints known in Spanish as Castillo de los Santos, at the centre of Oran. The three forts are connected by tunnels. Fort of Santa Cruz was built between 1577 and 1604 by the Spaniards on the Pic d'Aidour above Gulf of Oran in the Mediterranean Sea, at an elevation of above 400 metres (1,312 ft). In 1831, the French occupied Oran and the fort.

A small chapel, known as the Chapel of Santa Cruz, stands close to the fort. This chapel has been refurbished with a tower, which has a huge statue of the Virgin Mary, said to be a replica of that at Notre-Dame de la Garde in Marseille, styled as Notre-Dame du Salut de Santa Cruz.

== Geography ==
The fort is located at a height of about 400 metres (1,300 ft) on Mount Murdjadjo, also known as Pic d'Aidour, from where there are views of Mers-el-Kebir, the strategic military port of Oran. Beneath the castle, on the hill slope, is the chapel of the Blessed Virgin, which is a Catholic pilgrimage site.

== History ==
The Ottomans built the first fort on the site. After the Spaniards defeated the Ottomans in the sixteenth Century, they rebuilt Fort of Santa Cruz. The Spaniards ruled Oran for about 300 years till 1792. In the past, the fortress of Santa Cruz accommodated the Oran city governors.

The fort city under Spanish rule continued to grow, requiring enlargement of the city walls. In spite of the improved fortifications, the city was the object of repeated attacks. Notable in this regard was when Moroccan Sharif Moulay Ismail tried to force his way past the defenses in 1707, only to see his army decimated. Oran was also hit by an earthquake in 1791, when most of the city was damaged and the Spanish who had ruled from 1509 evacuated. The French then occupied the city in 1831.

Santacruz was the highest of the three forts erected by the Spanish above the town of Oran which was a dominantly Muslim town with buildings of mostly Moorish architecture. To show their dominance of "Crescent above the Cross", the local people built the Marabut chapel, opposite to the fort at a higher elevation. This chapel was crowned with a crescent on a white cupola. Spaniards held on here till 1792, after the 1791 earthquake. When the French occupied, the Muslims all migrated into the interior parts of Algeria but many returned later after Abd–el-Khader was defeated.

== Architecture ==
The fort, built between 1577 and 1604, The fortifications of the place were composed of thick and continuous walls of over two and a half kilometers in circumference, surmounted by strong towers spaced between them, with a central castle or kasbah where the Spanish governor established his headquarters. The fort was built with iron, wood, sand, lime and water carried up the hill through winding and difficult paths. It was expanded repeatedly to strengthen the fortifications, the galleries passing underneath the town mounting and descending the various hills.

It has a rainwater storage harvesting system, with the largest tank having a capacity of 300,000 liters.

=== Santa Cruz chapel ===
The Santa Cruz Chapel was built by the Bishop of Oran at the place where he had carried the statue of the Virgin Mary in a procession, followed by the people of the city, to the Oran hill, when a cholera epidemic had affected the people of Oran, in 1847. They sought blessings from the Virgin Mary to protect the city from the epidemic. The entire population implored the Blessed Virgin to bless the place with rain. After the rain came, the town of Oran and the region were saved from the epidemic of cholera. As a tribute to this miracle, a chapel was built on the hill at the foot of the fort of Santa Cruz. This chapel is named the Santa Cruz Church. It was considered as being the Protector of the town. In commemoration of this event, every year until Algeria became independent in 1962, Ascension Day was observed when the people of Oran and the surrounding areas paid homage to the Virgin Mary by climbing up the mountain trail to the chapel as a pilgrimage.

== Gallery ==
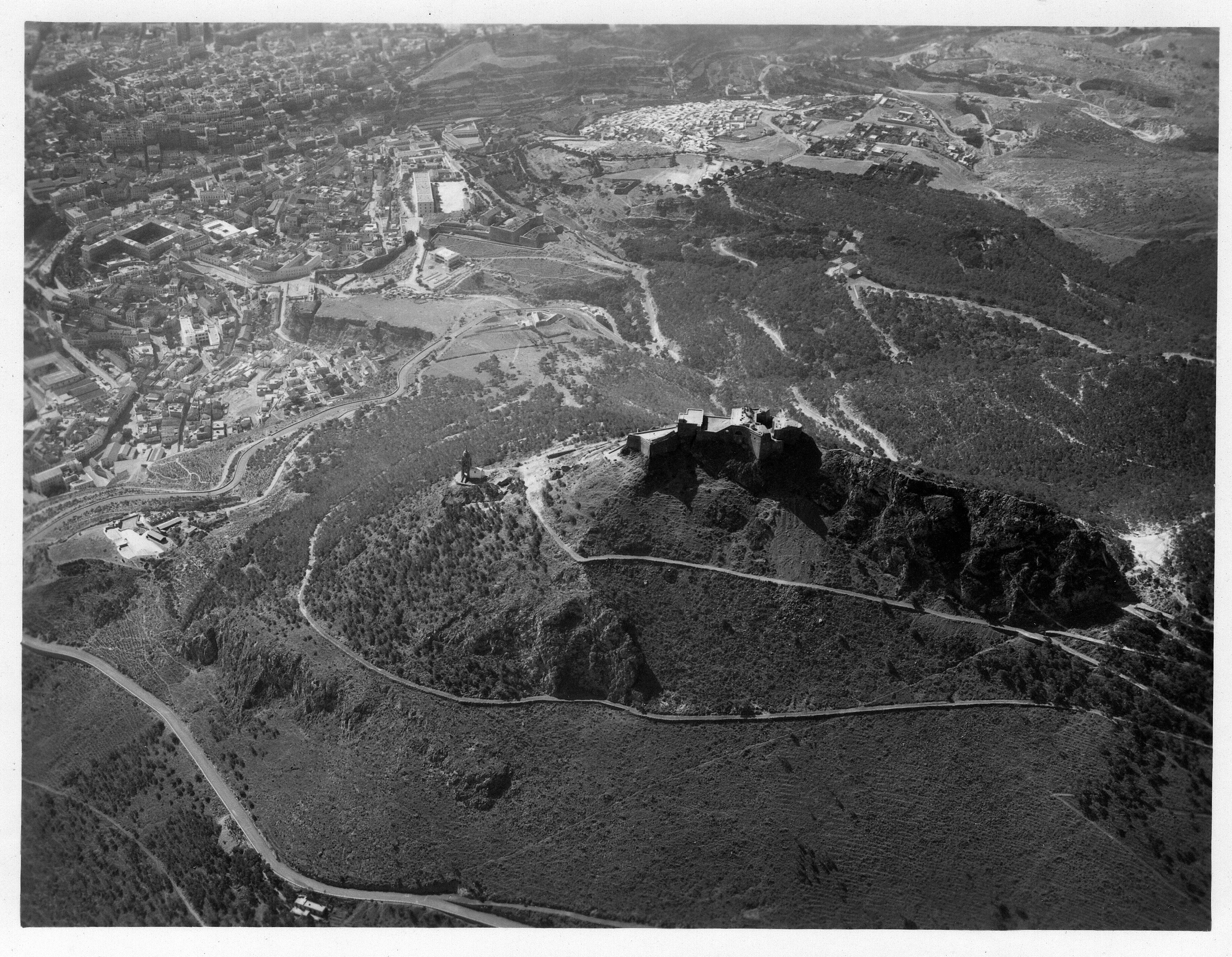
Aerial view of the fort and the chapel in 1942

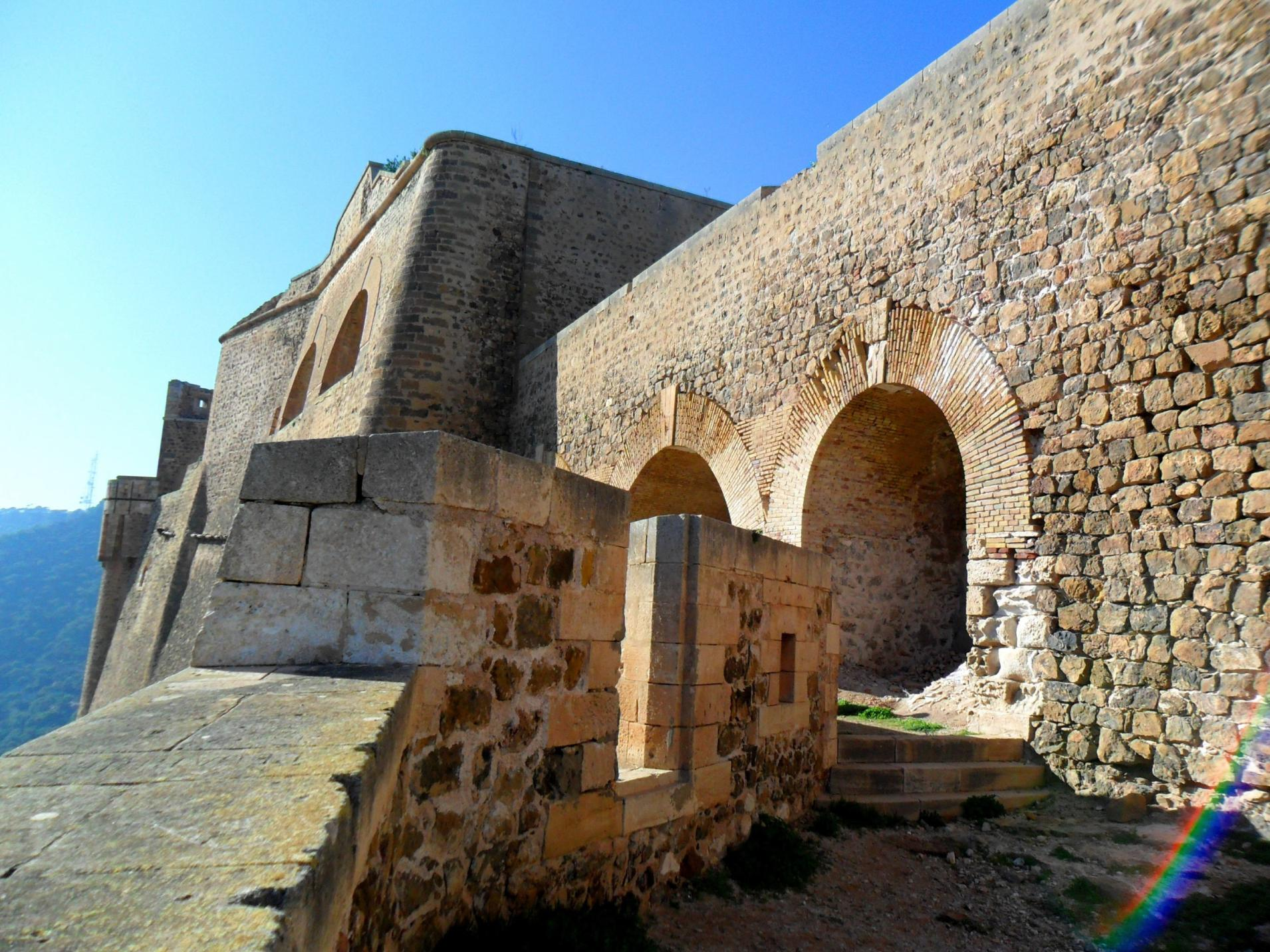
Ramparts of the Fort of Santa Cruz

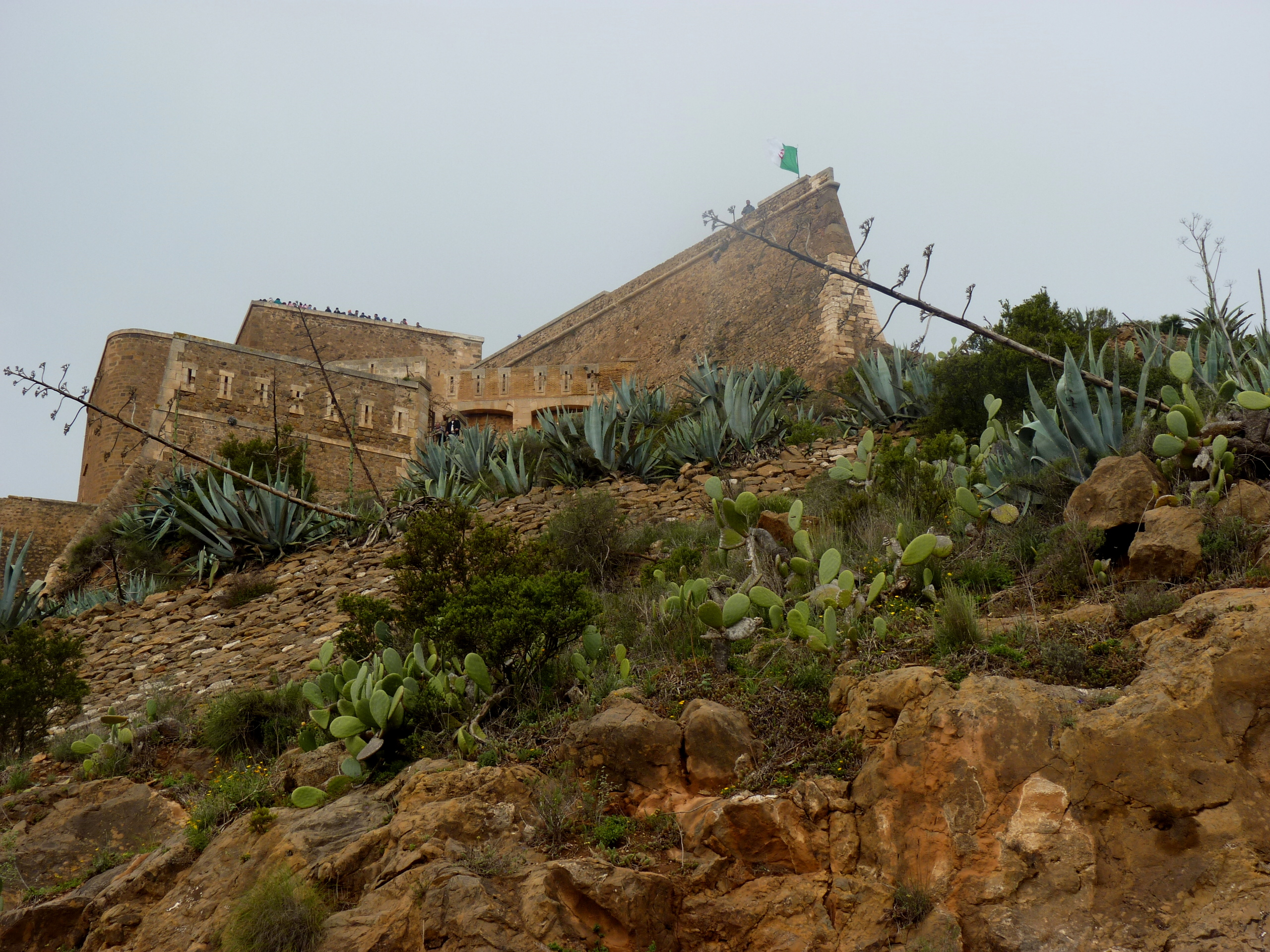
Northern front of the fort

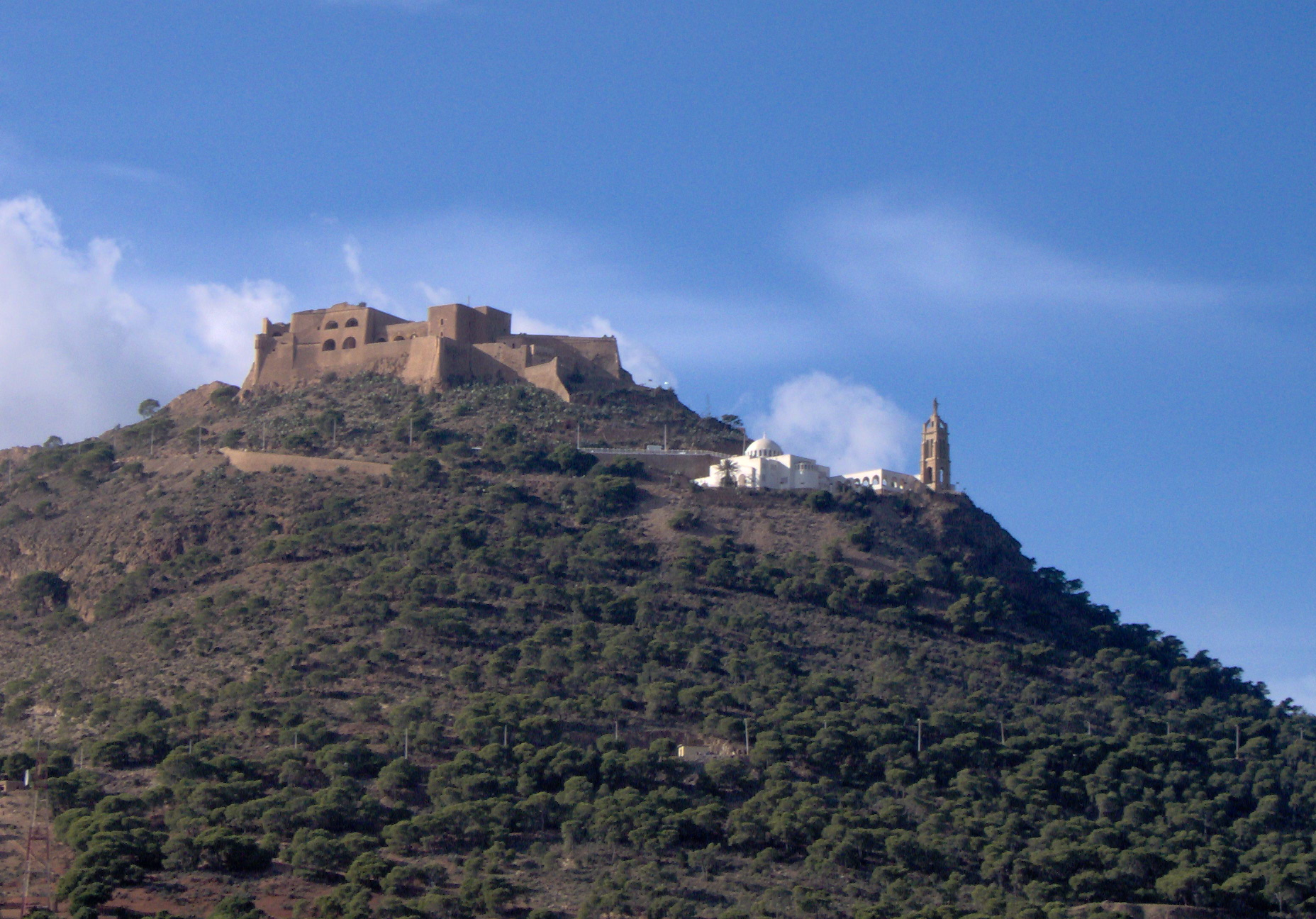
Fort of Santa Cruz and the whitewashed Notre-Dame de Santa Cruz church in Oran

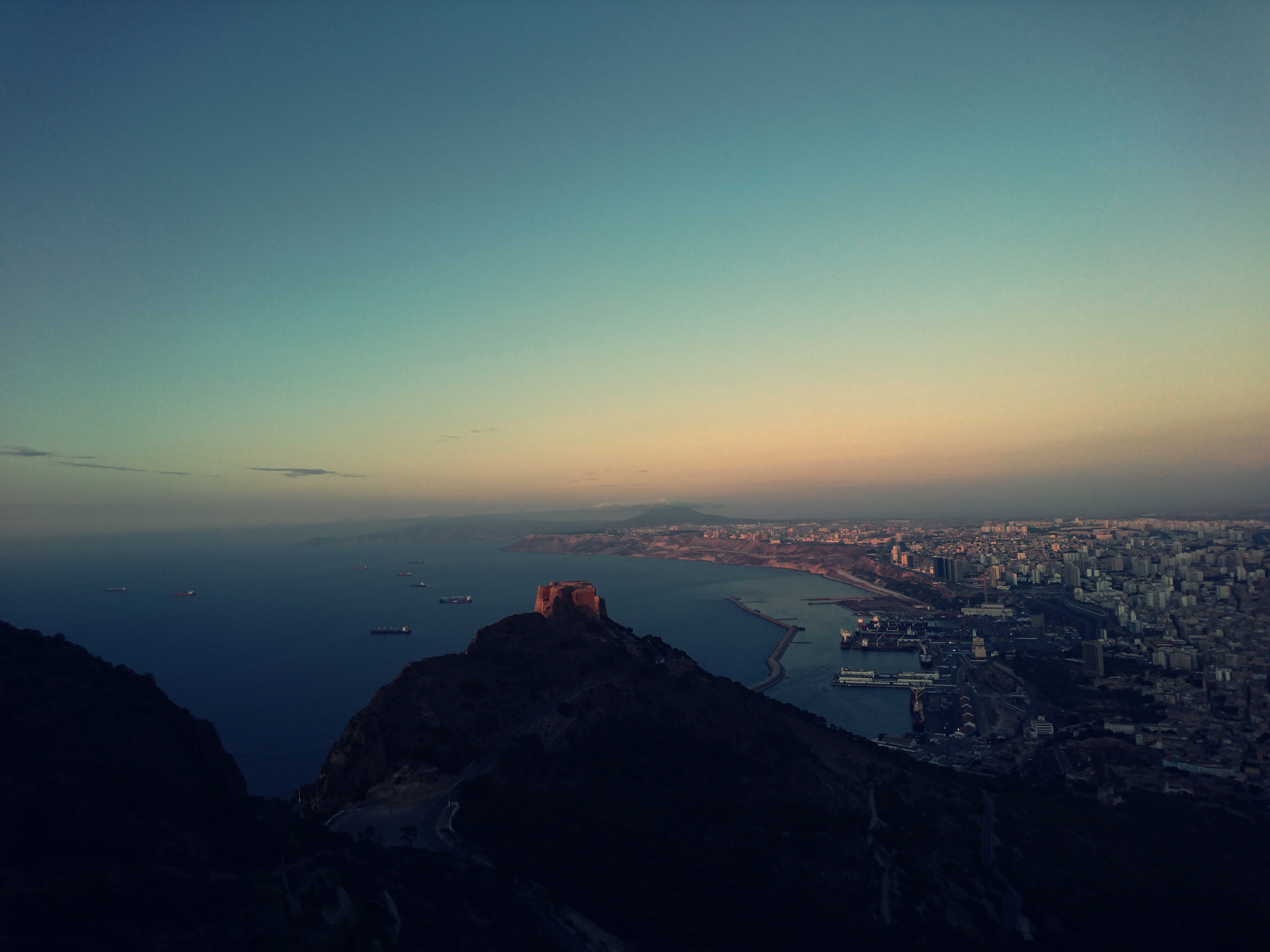
Fort of Santa Cruz dominating the city of Oran
