= Holy See–Israel relations =

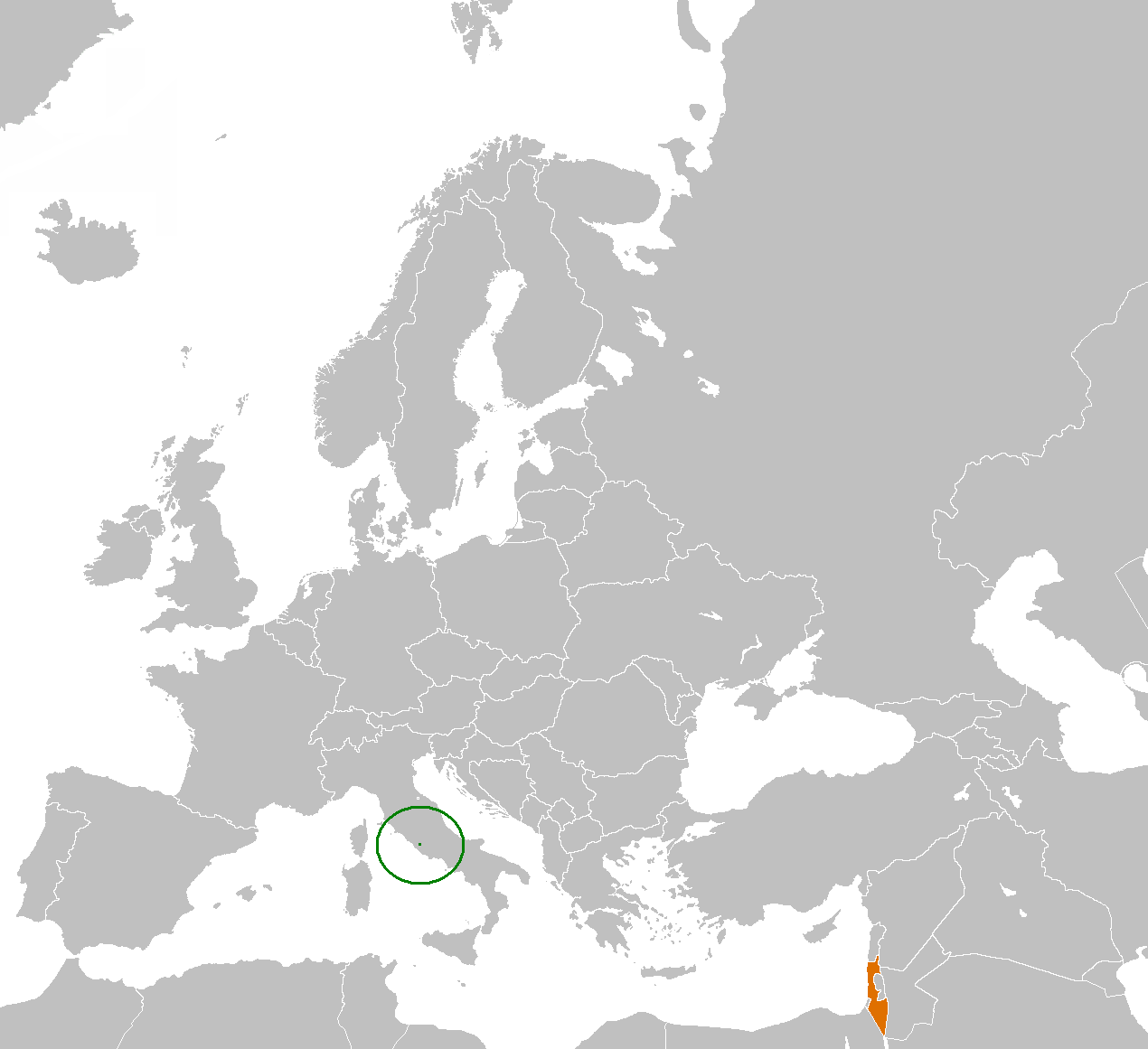
- Holy See: Israel

Diplomatic mission
- Apostolic Nunciature to Israel: Israeli Embassy to the Holy See

Envoy
- Apostolic Nuncio Adolfo Tito Yllana: Ambassador Raphael Schutz

Formal diplomatic relations between the Holy See and the State of Israel were established on 30 December 1993 after the adoption of a "Fundamental Agreement" between the two states. A Vatican nunciature in Israel and an Israeli embassy in Rome were simultaneously opened on 19 January 1994. From the Vatican's point of view, the establishment of diplomatic relations between the two states is part of the Christian–Jewish reconciliation and, from the Israeli point of view, the normalization of diplomatic relations. Before diplomatic relations were established, the interests of the Catholic Church in Israel were looked after by the Apostolic Delegate to Jerusalem and Palestine, the Latin Patriarch of Jerusalem and the Custodian of the Holy Land, all of which continue to function.

Andrea Cordero Lanza di Montezemolo was appointed as the first Apostolic Nuncio to Israel, Shmuel Hadas was appointed first Israeli Ambassador to the Holy See, in September of that year.

Since 3 June 2021, the Nuncio to Israel has been Adolfo Tito Yllana. The present Israeli ambassador to the Vatican is Raphael Schutz. Oren David was the Ambassador from 2016 to 2021, and Zion Evrony was the Ambassador from 30 September 2012 to 2016. He followed Mordechay Lewy, who was appointed in May 2008, Oded Ben-Hur (from June 2003), Yosef Neville Lamdan (from September 2000), Aharon Lopez (from April 1997), and Shmuel Hadas (from September 1994).

== Fundamental Agreement ==
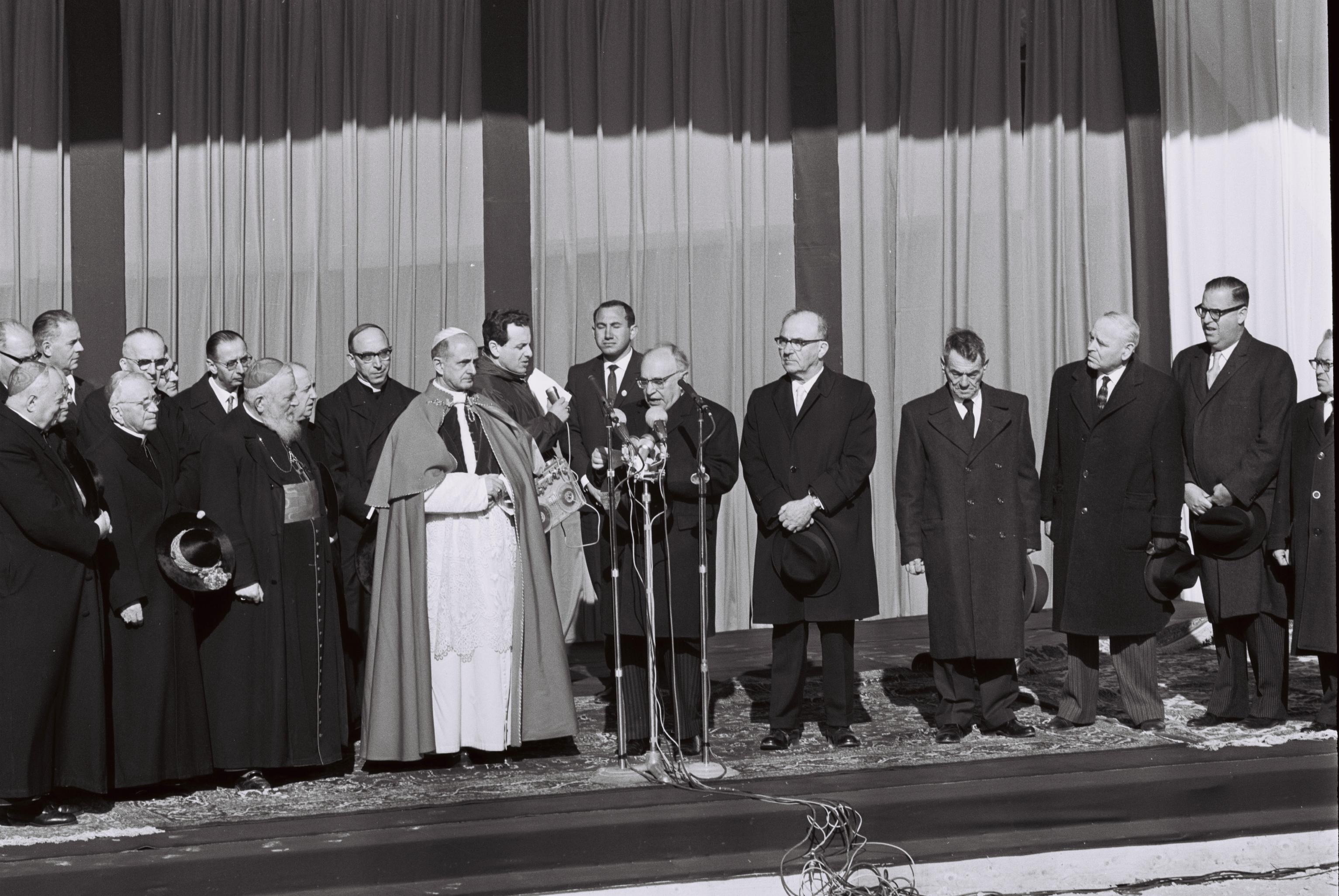
Pope Paul VI greeted in Israel by President Zalman Shazar and Prime Minister Levi Eshkol, 1964.

On 30 December 1993, the Holy See and Israel signed two agreements—the Fundamental Agreement Between the Holy See and the State of Israel and an Additional Protocol. The Fundamental Agreement is seen as a concordat that deals with tax exemptions and property rights of the Catholic Church and related entities within Israeli territory that entered into force on 10 March 1994, but has not been ratified by the Knesset. The Additional Protocol details provisions related to the establishment of normal diplomatic ties between the Holy See and Israel, pursuant to which the Holy See established on 15 June 1994 full diplomatic relations with Israel. The Holy See set up an Apostolic Nunciature to Israel in Tel Aviv, and appointed an Apostolic Nuncio. Several outstanding issues had still to be resolved, and have still to be resolved.

On 10 November 1997, the Holy See and Israel entered into a further agreement, titled Legal Personality Agreement Between the State of Israel and the Holy See, but this agreement has also not been ratified by the Knesset. Under the 1997 agreement, Israel would recognise the juridical personality and the authority of canon law within the Catholic Church and its institutions, as well as those of the Latin Patriarchate of Jerusalem and of the Eastern Catholic Patriarchates and their respective dioceses in Israeli territory, and the recognition of prevailing Israeli law in civil and criminal matters.

Diplomatic relations are tense due to the non-resolution of the accords relating to property rights and tax exemptions for the Church in Israel, the political activism of clergy in Israel and the Palestinian Authority, and the interplay between Israel-Vatican relations – on one hand – and the Jewish-Catholic inter-religious dialogue – on the other. The main concerns of the Vatican in Israel is the protection of the Latin Church Catholic churches, its properties and assets, and of the Holy places. Israel, for its part, has taken offence at several matters regarded by the Vatican as internal issues but which are seen by Israel and Jews around the world as of religious and historical consequence. These issues include the beatification of Pope Pius XII despite his failure to speak out against the Holocaust while it was still happening, the pardoning of a Holocaust-denying priest, and the subordination of inter-religious dialogue to evangelical aims.

== The unique character of Holy See—Israel relations ==
While the Vatican has had diplomatic relations with Israel since 1993, it does not endorse a theological basis for the support of the state. Diplomatically, the Vatican views Israel's ambassador as a representative of Israel and not of the Jewish people and, if he accompanies a religious delegation, the Jewish religious leaders present must be Israeli citizens. Any similar delegation composed of non-Israeli Jews would be accompanied by the respective national ambassador.

For Israel, as with most states, the ability to assess diplomatic relations with a state that is lacking economic relations, cannot be quantifiable. Furthermore, since the Vatican is not a full member of any international organisation but only an observer and since official Vatican statements are phrased in extremely nuanced language, much public diplomacy requires interpretation of papal statements. Thus, to understand this unique relationship, traditional parameters must be replaced with a framework that employs a totally different set of parameters:

=== First parameter – scope of representation ===
The Nuncio has a rank of archbishop, and has both diplomatic and ecclesial functions. Besides his religious functions, the Nuncio also cares about the well-being of all Catholics in Israel, and intervenes on their behalf with the authorities. In this respect, the Nuncio's relations with government authorities overlap with the prerogatives of the Latin Patriarchate of Jerusalem.

=== Second parameter – diplomatic v. ecclesial duties ===
The Nuncio's has both diplomatic and ecclesial duties. When he requests to enter an area of restricted accessibility for the purpose of holding mass, he is making a request in the name of religious freedom. Once his request is respected, it is regarded as a political gesture, meeting the expectations of religious freedom, but also in order to maintain friendly bilateral relations. If, however, he speaks to the media about his visit upon his return, it may be seen as a political and not as a spiritual act. This interplay enables using political tools to ease theological tensions that cannot be solved without one side or the other disavowing his faith.

=== Third parameter – freedom of religion v. security ===
The opposite case would involve, for example, the issuance of visas one acceptable gauge of measuring relations between states, which should ideally be a transparent process. Extending visa permits to Catholic clergy is, for the Vatican, a matter of exercising freedom of religion. If, however, a clergy holds passports from states that are at war with, or do not recognize Israel, the matter is regarded by Israeli authorities rather as a security issue. The result of one side's existential caution may be seen by the other side as an infringement upon freedom of religion.

== Bilateral relations ==
=== Visa policy ===
In 2002, after the September 11 attacks and start of the Second Intifada, Israel adopted a more restrictive policy on permits for stays longer than three months. The change also applied to Christian clergy, who previously received permits in uncontrolled numbers and for practically indefinite periods. All previous permits were revoked and the number of permits was limited as were their duration. Each application was to be examined on its own merits.

In July 2012, Israel lifted all visa restrictions on Vatican passport holders. As of January 2025, all passport holders that do not require a Visa to travel to Israel need to apply for an Electronic Travel Authorization (ETA-IL). The change doesn't apply to clergy visas, but it would apply to non-diplomatic visa free travel for stays less than three months. On 31 December 2025, the Holy See umbrella charity organization Caritas Internationalis was one of 37 NGOs that did not meet the deadline to comply with enhanced security regulations and at least temporarily lost its license to operate in Israel. It responded by saying it would continue to operate and its status has been recognized by the Holy-See Israel agreement. However, it lost the ability to sponsor humanitarian visas.

=== Fiscal negotiations ===
The longstanding negotiations of fiscal and property issues related to Catholic institutions in Israel have also proven to be complex: after a long break, negotiations were resumed in 2004, and since then, considerable progress has been achieved. Upon a Vatican suggestion, the dissemination of public statements is restricted to joint communiqués according to the principle that "nothing is agreed unless everything is agreed".

The subject to be negotiated is which tax and what is the degree of exemption that Catholic Church institutions should enjoy. Another issue to be dealt is which ecclesiastical property should enjoy what degree of immunity of expropriation. A sovereign state like Israel may well decide about present exemptions and immunities.

The Catholic Church however has an interest in safeguarding its presence and property until eternity by alleviating itself from any future financial burdens. These are highly complex issues in which, not only the Holy See is represented at the table, but also different local Catholic churches and institutions. Along the Israeli side of the table, four ministries are represented in the negotiations: Justice, Finance, Interior and Foreign Affairs. The latter leads the negotiations on behalf of the Israeli government. Some Israelis criticise the negotiations. It seems to them that Israel conducts an unfortunate 'give and give' equation and not a 'give and take' formula. Others see the benefit of speedy conclusion of the negotiations, as the relations might develop additional political dimensions.

=== The religious dimension ===
Following the visit of Pope John Paul II, the framework of an inter-religious dialogue between the Chief Rabbinate of Israel and the respective Pontifical Council was established. The dialogue has taken place on an annual basis since 2003, meeting alternatively in Jerusalem and in the Vatican. It does not touch doctrinal matters of faith, but discusses various issues, such as bioethics, environmental problems, brain and clinical death, as well as matters pertaining to religious tolerance and violence. The annual meetings upgraded Israel's relations with the Holy See, as it gave the necessary theological symmetry to the formal diplomatic relations. The dialogue between the Vatican and the Rabbinate has proven to be a safety net in removing misunderstandings that cause theological tensions.

Israel's bilateral requests are limited by nature and do not touch upon any internal political issue of the Vatican. Even in the case of Pius XII's possible beatification, Israeli policy is to refrain from interfering in internal ecclesiastical affairs. It does, however, reserve its right to express its opinion on Pacelli's historical performance. With regard to this latter, Cardinal Walter Kasper mentioned the issue in his remarkable speech "Recent Developments in Jewish-Christian Relations", which he held at Hope University in Liverpool on 24 May 2010:

In the case that it proceeds [i.e. beatification process], it will not be an historical assessment but a spiritual discernment, whether this Pope in his situation followed his personal conscience and did the will of God as he understood it in his situation. So an eventual beatification would not preclude further historical research and interpretation nor would it exclude the assessment that other people with a different character may have come to different conclusions and may have acted in a different way.

In 2020, the Holy See opened its Vatican Apostolic Archive, previously known as the Vatican Secret Archive, for the period of Pius XII's pontificate (1939–1958). Some issues to be raised on the bilateral agenda are seen by the Holy See also as theological matters, such as anti-Semitism and Holocaust revisionism and denial. The latter gained momentum with the Williamson affair, as more attention was brought to the issue of members of the Fraternity of Pius X adhering to revisionist and anti-Semitic ideas. The brotherhood was not readmitted to the Catholic Church, as most of them still resist the teaching of the Vatican Second Council, including reorientation towards the Jewish people.

On the other hand, and as described above, diplomatic efforts can be used to offset religious tensions. In January 2010, following the declaration of Pius XII as Venerable – a step that could precede his beatification to which Roman Jews vehemently object, vocal elements within the Roman Jewish community called for the cancellation of the Papal visit to the Great Synagogue of Rome. However, under public pressure, Israeli diplomatic channels were mobilized to lend the necessary support from Israel by increasing the scope of and upgrading the Israeli presence. The deputy Prime Minister was present, as was a high-level delegation of the Chief Rabbinate, and the opposition was greatly diffused.

=== Bilateral relations under John Paul II ===
At the beginning of John Paul II's Pontificate, no relations were established with the Israeli government. In 1985, the State of Israel was first mentioned in a public Vatican document.

Diplomatic incidents occurred as John Paul II met PLO chairman Arafat several times, against the protests of the Israeli government and some Jewish organizations. In 1987, the Pope met Austrian President Kurt Waldheim, an action protested by the Israeli government due to revelations about Waldheim's wartime past. Another incident occurred in January 1987, when Cardinal John J. O'Connor, Archbishop of New York, visited Israel and refused to meet Israeli President Chaim Herzog in Jerusalem, in protest of Israeli control over East Jerusalem.

The Pope had a strategic aim to work for the upgrading of the positions of the Catholic communities in the Middle East from a passive minority to active citizens, participating in formulating their countries' agendas, as he pointed out in a speech made on 11 October 1992 at the Pontifical Lateran University.

On 29 July 1992, a bilateral working commission titled Permanent Bilateral Working Commission between Israel and the Holy See was established to resolve issues of relations between the Israeli government and the Vatican.

The Fundamental Agreement between the Holy See and the State of Israel, concluded on 30 December 1993, led to the opening of the Vatican Nunciature in Israel in 1994. The first Israeli Ambassador to the Vatican presented his credentials on 29 September 1994.

However, the agreement did not settle all issues between the Vatican and the Israeli government. Many historical church buildings and other properties in Israel were either devastated in 1948 and not allowed to rebuild or seized by the Israeli government without being restored to the Catholic Church. In addition, Israel's character as a Jewish state and the prominent position given to Jewish Orthodox circles in social and state affairs, led to a policy of social discrimination against the local Catholic, part of them being Israeli Arabs, the others being members of mixed families who came to Israel under the Law of Return or even local Jews who converted within Israel. Article 10 of the agreement provided for a comprehensive agreement to be reached in future negotiations under the auspices of the joint commission established in 1992. Fr. David-Maria A. Jaeger, one of the Vatican negotiators for the Fundamental Agreement, explained in a 2007 interview as for the reasons for concluding the agreement with Israel without first resolving all outstanding issues in the following words:

It was believed best to go ahead, and demonstrate, right at the start, with magnanimity, the Church's own good faith, and with it, unreserved trust in the other Party to carry out its own obligations under international law. There was the hope-full expectation that magnanimity and trust on the part of the Church would call forth corresponding trust and magnanimity on the part of the other side. It was a courageously generous decision by the Servant of God Pope John Paul II, and I, for my part, continue to pray and hope that he will be proved to have been right all along.

The first Apostolic Nuncio to Israel was Andrea Cordero Lanza di Montezemolo, who had been Apostolic Delegate to Jerusalem and Palestine since 1990, who served from 1994 until 1998; then replaced by Archbishop Pietro Sambi, who served until 2006.

An additional aspect of Vatican policy towards Israel following the establishment of diplomatic relations was the beginning of interest in the internal problems of Israeli society. This can be seen in the words of the Pope to the Israeli Ambassador to the Holy See on 10 April 1997:

we are speaking here of an important step in helping all the people of Israel, regardless of religious faith or cultural differences, to work together as equal partners in the building up of Israeli society.

This interest in Israeli society led to the reference to Israeli security concerns in his message to the Palestinian people made on 22 September 1997. Now, he began to address also the public in both Israeli and Palestinian societies, as seen from his message to young Israelis and Palestinians, delivered on 22 September 1999.

On 10 November 1997, a supplementary agreement was signed between the two parties, which recognized the various Catholic organs in Israel as legal personalities under Israeli law.

Following the outbreak of the Second Intifada in September 2000, Israeli–Vatican relations cooled down, and many joint projects, such as planned exhibitions on Jewish history in Vatican museums and joint scholarly conferences, were put on hold by the Pope and other Vatican officials. The Israeli government decided to work for improving relations through back channels, and this led to the creation in December 2001 of the Cardinal Bea Center for Judaic Studies within the Gregorian University, which held many Israeli–Vatican events under its auspices rather than the Vatican Secretariat of State.

The joint commission established in 1992 and charged with formulating a comprehensive agreement on all issues, met briefly in 1994, and then no meeting were held until 2004. No progress was made on issues in question.

=== Bilateral relations under Benedict XVI ===
Under Pope Benedict XVI, the Holy See and the Israeli government continued negotiations about a comprehensive Vatican-Israel agreement.

In early 2006, Benedict XVI appointed Antonio Franco Apostolic Nuncio to Israel, to replace Pietro Sambi.

A major step taken in early 2006 was the nomination of Fr. Elias Shakur as Greek-Catholic Archbishop of Acre. This was the first time since the establishment of the State of Israel in 1948 that an Israeli citizen was appointed to that position.

A major progress in relations between the Vatican and Israeli Rabbis took place in October 2008, when Rabbi Shear Yashuv Hacohen became the first ever Rabbi to speak before a Synod of Bishops at the Vatican.

In early 2009, the Holy See officially protested about a TV program by Israeli comedian Lior Shlein, who claimed that Mary wasn't really a virgin and that Jesus did not walk on water.

Throughout 2009, the Permanent Bilateral Working Commission between Israel and the Holy See held several rounds of talks in order to reach a comprehensive agreement on legal and financial matters, but on 10 December, talks broke down, and Israeli Deputy Foreign Minister Danny Ayalon stated they reached a crisis. A major stumbling block in that round of talks was the room of the Last Supper on Mt. Zion in Jerusalem, which is being held by the Israeli government. The Holy See sought to gain jurisdiction over this room, a demand refused by the Israeli government. Ayalon stated this was an issue of sovereignty over Jerusalem.

In May 2010 it was reported that Israeli–Vatican negotiations have been held in order to conclude a comprehensive agreement between the parties. On 21 September, the Permanent Bilateral Working Commission between Israel and the Holy See met again in Israel for further negotiations on that issue. Fr. David-Maria Jaeger, who took part in the Vatican delegation, reported progress on these issues. Further progress was reported after another meeting in mid November.

On 9 December 2010, another meeting of the Permanent Bilateral Working Commission between Israel and the Holy See took place in Israel, at which the Vatican representatives expressed sympathy with the Israeli casualties of the Carmel forest fire. The next meeting was scheduled for 3 February 2011.

Benedict XVI continued to cultivate the relations with the Hebrew Catholics in Israel, began under his predecessor. In December 2010, the Assembly of Catholic Ordinaries in the Holy Land held a joint symposium with the Jerusalem Institute for Israel Studies, the Jerusalem Center for Jewish Christian Relations and the Interfaith Coordinating Council in Israel regarding the implications of the Synod on the Middle East held in October. In this symposium, most of the Catholic clergy present spoke in Hebrew, which was a sign of approach being made towards Israeli society.

The Catholic hierarchy in Israel began dealing more openly also with the pastoral needs of the Catholic foreign workers in Israel, and in August 2010, the Latin Patriarch Fouad Twal appointed Father Jayaseellan Pitchaimuthu as the point person for the care of Indian Catholic foreign workers in Israel.

=== Jerusalem and the holy places ===
Already during the 19th century, the Holy See was concerned about the control over the holy places in Palestine, especially in Jerusalem. In 1887, Pope Leo XIII issued a motu proprio titled Domini et Salvatoris, in which he called for the establishment of a Catholic fund to maintain the holy places in Jerusalem and the Holy Land.

The early Zionists sought to assure the Vatican of the sanctity of Christian holy places, but the Vatican was not satisfied with these assurances. The Vatican was not invited to attend the 1920 San Remo conference, which decided the fate of Palestine, and had to rely on France and Italy to represent its interests. The San Remo conference set aside a Protectorate of the Holy See. According to Minerbi, the Vatican's objectives were ultimately undermined by the Zionist Organization's support for a British Mandate.

But the Vatican did not give up on its objective of direct Catholic control of the Holy Land and the holy places. The Vatican's idea for an international commission to resolve claims on the holy places had been incorporated in article 95 of the Treaty of Sèvres, and was repeated as articles 13 and 14 of the Mandate. Britain assumed responsibility for the holy places under article 13 of the Mandate. However, Britain never created the International Commission on Holy Places to resolve the other claims in accordance with article 14 of the Mandate.

The Vatican's official position on the status of Jerusalem was in favour of an internationalization of Jerusalem, in order to keep the holy places away from either Israeli or Arab sovereignty.

At the time of the proposals that culminated in the United Nations Partition Plan for Palestine of 1947, the Vatican, the Italian, and the French governments continued to press their own legal claims on the basis of the former Protectorate of the Holy See and the French Protectorate of Jerusalem. The proposal was also incorporated in UN General Assembly Resolution 194 in 1948. On 1 May 1948, just two weeks before end of the British Mandate, Pope Pius XII issued the encyclical Auspicia quaedam, expressing concern over the survival of the holy places in case of war. The Israeli Declaration of Independence of 14 May 1948 committed Israel to "guarantee freedom of religion ... [and to] safeguard the Holy Places of all religions". However, the Vatican's position on the holy places was repeated in encyclical In multiplicibus curis of 24 October 1948, which called for respect and protection of the holy places and called on the peace-makers to give Jerusalem and its outskirts "an international character" and to assure – "with international guarantees" – freedom of access and worship at the holy places scattered throughout Palestine. (#8) In encyclical Redemptoris nostri cruciatus of 15 April 1949, Pope Pius XII repeated his concern over the future of freedom of access to the holy places and his call for an "international status" as the best protection for the holy places.

A powerful Vatican diplomatic effort succeeded to integrate the concept of international status for Jerusalem as corpus separatum into the partition plan of 29 November 1947 (UNGA 181). The Holy See tried to condition Israel's UN membership in 1949 upon the demand that it should adhere to those concepts that were agreed in UN Resolution 181, but failed. A relic of it is visible every day in L'Osservatore Romano, when it reports about Israel from Tel Aviv and never from Jerusalem. Following the Six-Day War, the Vatican modified its position on the holy places. In an address to the College of Cardinals in December 1967, Pope Paul VI called for a "special statute, internationally guaranteed" for Jerusalem and the holy places, thus changing the previous demand for the internationalization of Jerusalem. The concept of a special status for Jerusalem is still alive in the Vatican's Secretariat of State, as well as the Preamble to the Basic Agreement between the Holy See and the PLO from 15 February 2000.

Since its establishment, Israel has exerted its sovereignty over all holy sites within Israel, a new situation that Catholicism has had to contend with since 1948. For decades, the Vatican resented Israel's claims to effective authority by denying it diplomatic relations. Even following the formalization of diplomatic relations in 1994, the Vatican continued to contest Israel's sovereignty over Jerusalem.

The Holy See traditionally seeks to safeguard also the Catholic presence in Jerusalem. During the war in 1948, not only Muslims but also Christians were among the population who abandoned their homes. The size of the Christian community in Jerusalem under Israel jurisdiction before and after 1967, however, is not diminishing, but is remarkably stable. Still, Catholic voices claim that the future of the Christian presence in the Holy City is at risk. This demographic trauma, real or imagined, is a constant trigger for the Holy See to remind the non-Christian parties who have ruled Jerusalem since 1948 (i.e. Israel and Jordan), that any political solution for the city should consider its special status – actually a catchword for considering also Christian interests in the city.

Article 4 of the Fundamental Agreement affirmed Israel's "commitment to maintain and respect the 'Status quo' in the Christian Holy Places" and "guarantee of the freedom of Catholic worship".

The Vatican has since assumed direct responsibility for the well-being of all local Catholic Churches within Israel's territorial jurisdiction. Alongside recognition, the Nuncio received an instrument enabling him to gain effective control and legal authority over all Catholic institutions and property in Israel – a tool he never had previously, under Turkish domination or Jordanian rule.

=== Bilateral relations under Francis ===
In February 2024, Cardinal Pietro Parolin told reporters that it was time for Israel to change its strategy in Gaza, explaining "other paths have to be found to resolve the problem of Gaza, the problem of Palestine." Israel’s Embassy to the Holy See responded to Parolin’s remarks, calling it "a deplorable declaration."

Pope Francis also drew criticism from Israel for his own remarks in a book in which he wrote "According to some experts, what is happening in Gaza has the characteristics of a genocide," calling for an investigation to see if "it fits into the technical definition formulated by jurists and international bodies."

After the death of Pope Francis, the official Israeli account on X shared a photo of the pontiff at the Western Wall, captioned: "May his memory be a blessing." This was quickly deleted by the Israeli government, and an official statement from Israeli Prime Minister Benjamin Netanyahu came four days later: "The State of Israel expresses its deepest condolences to the Catholic Church and the Catholic community worldwide at the passing of Pope Francis. May he rest in peace."

== Religious attitudes as a factor in Holy See-Israel relations ==
While not strictly related to diplomatic relations between Israel and the Holy See, Jewish attitudes towards Christianity and Christian attitudes towards Judaism are certainly part of the triangle of relations that envelops individual religious attitudes, high level diplomatic relations, and formal Jewish-Catholic inter-religious dialogue.

=== Historical and Modern Religious Attitudes ===
A major factor overshadowing Holy See – Israel relations is an existing indifference within Israeli society to Christianity in general, where Christians make up less than 2% of the population of Israel, primarily speak Arabic rather than Hebrew, and are usually overshadowed by the Jewish and Islamic aspects of the Arab–Israeli conflict. There is a movement among some Arabic speaking Israeli Christians to identify ethnically as Aramaen, instead of linguistically Arab, to separate Israeli Christians from the Arab-Israeli conflict. At their request, the Israeli government created a new Aramaen population registry category in 2021, which also for the first time gives Christians separate representation on Israel's Equal Opportunity in Employment Commission. Some Christians have changed their registration from Arab to Aramaen.

Jews converting to Christianity are often considered traitors to Zionism, due to historical sensitivities and due to the nationalist goal of establishing a safe haven state for Jews. Most Israeli Jews refrain from sending their children to Christian schools, where the language of instruction is primarily Arabic, as native level Hebrew language skills are required by most of Israeli society. This is in contrast to the perception among Arabic speaking Muslim families in Israel who, not only do not object to their children attending Christian schools, but even consider it a mark of excellence in Arabic speaking society.

The loaded relations are influenced by history from before the founding of the state of Israel. The separation of the Early Christian community from the bonds of mainstream Judaism, which were accompanied by a vast corpus of polemical literature, in which Jews had a share as well as Christians. Religious animosity extended into the European Middle Ages, during which Jews lived as a minority under Christian domination and experienced religious persecution and murder. Hostility was even ritualized in some Christian prayers and some references in a Jewish prayer were either intended or reinterpreted by some as referring to Christians. Many Orthodox Jews do not enter church sanctuaries and associate the crucifix with medieval antisemitism that blames Jews for nailing Jesus to the cross. Jewish Orthodoxy "previously pluralistic in its relation with Christians, after the Shoa [Holocaust] has become less flexible, to say the least." The Jewish Ultra-Orthodox Haredim will not meet with priests.

=== Religious dialogue in history ===
During the exile, many Jews lived in a hostile Christian environment, which never abandoned its religious zeal to convert Jews. In fact, most Jews perceive their history during the Diaspora as a traumatic battle of survival against constant Catholic efforts to convert them gently or, in many cases, coercively. Survival techniques included theological self-sufficiency and exclusivity; and Jewish proselytism became impossible once Christianity became the official religion of the Roman Empire.

Notwithstanding, Medieval rabbinical sources show respect to other religions. Of the three prevalent attitudes towards Christians, only the Ultra-Orthodox (Haredi) Judaics are totally negative, guided by the Psak Halacha [halachic verdict] from 1967 of Rabbi Moshe Feinstein (1895–1985). This verdict, published in Igrot Moshe, Yore Dea 3:43 prohibited any meetings with priests.

=== Post Conciliar attitudes ===
For now, Haredi attitudes, which even delegitimize other minded Orthodox Jews, seem to persist. The Orthodox mainstream attitude is expressed by Rabbi Joseph B. Soloveitchik (1903–1993), the leading authority of Orthodoxy in America. His programmatic article "Confrontation" is considered a response to pre-Nostrae aetate deliberations. Although he denies the possibility of religious dialogue, he suggests a common platform of concerted action in the secular public sphere. Soloveitchik's parameters are:

1. Jewish-Christian scope of action for the common good is confined to the secular sphere, as God commanded mankind in Genesis 1:28: replenish the earth, and subdue it.
2. Respectful relations between religions require strict non-interference. One should refrain from suggesting to other faith changes in ritual or emendations of its texts.

As a result, only a few Jewish representatives are today actually engaged in the current dialogue with Catholics. As much as the ongoing dialogue is pursued on the highest possible official level between the Chief Rabbinate of Israel and the Holy See, reluctance of the Orthodox mainstream persists. Reform and Conservative Judaism are more open to dialogue, primarily from the viewpoint of their American experience, where communal cohabitation among ethnic and religious groups is the lifeline of American society.

Forty years of Jewish-Catholic dialogue after Nostrae aetate have been a period of mutual trial and error in which an own dynamism developed. Emerging modern Orthodoxy has gone beyond the confines that Soloveitchik delineated, becoming the hardcore of modern Orthodox currents, which carry the message of the present dialogue. One of their renowned speakers, Rabbi David Rosen, explains the rationales of dialoguing with Catholics thus:

1. Ignorance breeds prejudice and thus threatens communities' well-being, especially for a minority. Through dialoguing, barriers of prejudice and stereotypes are removed and mutual respect is promoted.
2. An ulterior basis for inter-religious relations is the perception of a "common agenda", as no religion is an island. All religions in the West have become minorities in an overwhelmingly secular world.
3. Each religion is equal before God with its own truth. The claim of monopoly on truth amounts to limiting the encounter with the Divine.
4. Christianity's identity is uniquely bound up with Jewish history and revelation, despite our fundamental differences. As Judaism teaches that our obligation is to testify to God's presence and sanctify his name in the world, we have an obligation to work together.

== Zionism, Israel and the Holy See before and after 1993 ==
=== Pius XII ===
Pius XII was Pope from 2 March 1939 to 9 October 1958, a period that straddled the Second World War period, which saw the destruction of European Jewry in the Holocaust, and saw the establishment of the State of Israel in 1948. He is noted for his rejection of any plan for the establishment of a State of Israel in the British Palestine territory, on religious and theological grounds.

Perhaps more than any other, it was the papacy of Pius XII that shaped Holy See – Israel relations prior to 1993. David Ben-Gurion is quoted having said in 1949 that, "There is a major religion in the world, which has to settle with us a historical reckoning." The immediate context was the Vatican campaign behind the scenes in the UN to condition Israel's becoming a member state upon its respect for the provisions of returning Palestinian refugees to the newly created Jewish State and committing itself to respecting the holy sites.

Until 1948 the Pope was motivated by the traditional Vatican opposition to Zionism. Vatican opposition to a Jewish homeland stemmed largely from theological doctrines regarding Judaism. In 1904, the Zionist leader Theodor Herzl obtained an audience with Pope Pius X in the hope of persuading the pontiff to support the establishment of a Jewish homeland in Palestine. The pope's response was: "Non possumus" ("We cannot"). In 1917, Pius X's successor, Pope Benedict XV, equally refused to support any concept for a Jewish state. Minerbi writes that when a League of Nations mandate were being proposed for Palestine, the Vatican was disturbed by the prospect of a (Protestant) British mandate over the Holy Land, but a Jewish state was anathema to it.

On 22 June 1943, Amleto Giovanni Cicognani, the Apostolic Delegate to Washington D.C. wrote to US President Franklin Roosevelt, asking him to prevent the establishment of a Jewish state in Palestine. His arguments against such plan were:

In this question two points must be considered. The first concerns the Holy Places (for example, the Basilica of the Holy Sepulcher, Bethlehem, etc.). Catholics rejoice in certain rights regarding these places and in justice their rights must be recognized, and respected. Repeated formal assurances that these rights will be respected are ever necessary and will again be required after the present war,

The second point concerns Palestine itself. Catholics the world over are piously devoted to this country, hallowed as it was by the presence of the Redeemer and esteemed as it is as the cradle of Christianity. If the greater part of Palestine is given to the Jewish people, this would be a severe blow to the religious attachment of Catholics to this land. To have the Jewish people in the majority would be to interfere with the peaceful exercise of these rights in the Holy Land already vested in Catholics.

It is true that at one time Palestine was inhabited by the Hebrew Race, but there is no axiom in history to substantiate the necessity of a people returning to a country they left nineteen centuries before.

On 11 February 1948, the Holy See created the office of Apostolic Delegate to Jerusalem and Palestine, with jurisdiction over Palestine, Transjordania, and Cyprus. In Vatican practice, an Apostolic Delegate is appointed to a country with which the Vatican has no diplomatic ties and which does not require accreditation to the government of the country.

Zionism had traditionally been associated with atheist Soviet Communism. L'Osservatore Romano commented on the establishment of Israel on 12 June 1948: "The birth of Israel gives Moscow a basis in the Near East through which the microbes can grow and being disseminated." Indeed, by adhering to the ideology of the Kibbutz or the socialist background of its founding fathers, the State of Israel wrongly created this impression. The steady deterioration of Israel's diplomatic relations with Stalinist Russia in 1953, on the other hand, went unnoticed in the Vatican. Any rapprochement toward the Jewish state was curtailed because of the conviction that, in order to safeguard the wellbeing of Christians under Muslim-Arab rule, the Vatican would have to pay the political price of supporting Arab claims against Israel. The Vatican view of the Near East was dominated by a Cold War perception that Arab Muslims are conservative but religious, whereas Israeli Zionists are modernist but atheists. The Vatican's then Foreign Minister, Domenico Tardini (without being even a bishop, but a close collaborator of Pius XII) said to the French ambassador in November 1957, according to an Israeli diplomatic dispatch from Rome to Jerusalem:

I have always been of the opinion that there never was an overriding reason for this state to be established. It was the fault of the western states. Its existence is an inherent risk factor for war in the Middle East. Now, Israel exists, and there is certainly no way to destroy it, but every day we pay the price of this error.

On 1 May 1948, two weeks before the end of the British Mandate, Pius XII issued the encyclical Auspicia quaedam, expressing concern over the survival of the holy places in case of war. During that war, the Franciscan Custos of the Holy Land Alberto Gori in his reports to the Vatican was most critical of the Jewish and later Israeli forces, whom he accused of destruction of holy places.

Despite Israeli assurances that Israel would guarantee freedom of religion and safeguard the Holy Places of all religions, on 24 October 1948, Pius issued the encyclical, In multiplicibus curis, which focused on the war then raging in Palestine and called for respect and protection of the holy places. On 15 April 1949, he issued the encyclical Redemptoris nostri cruciatus, in which he expressed concern over the future of freedom of access to the holy places and called for a "settlement of the dispute on principles of justice, which would fully safeguard the freedom of Catholics and at the same time provide guarantees for the safety of those most Holy Places".

tranquillity or order in Palestine is still very far from having been restored. For We are still receiving complaints from those who have every right to deplore the profanation of sacred buildings, images, charitable institutions, as well as the destruction of peaceful homes of religious communities. Piteous appeals still reach us from numerous refugees, of every age and condition, who have been forced by the disastrous war to emigrate and even live in exile in concentration camps, the prey to destitution, contagious disease and perils of every sort.

The French La Documentation Catholiques went even farther and published a report declaring that "Zionism is the new Nazism".

Another aim of Redemptoris nostri cruciatus, however, was to mobilise Catholics worldwide to remind their respective governments to forward those demands before admitting Israel to the UN. Surprised by the unexpected victory of Israel in 1948 over the Arab forces, the Vatican saw the Christian presence in the Holy Land diminish, claiming that 70% of the local Christians had fled from their homes as a consequence of the acts of Israel's belligerency.

Thus, by initially siding with Palestinian claims for compensations on political, social and financial levels, the Vatican shaped its Middle Eastern policy since 1948 upon two pillars. One was based on political and theological reservations against Zionism, which corresponded with attitudes of Catholic Arab communities whose members had taken a leading part in shaping the Palestinian national movement. But the Holy See has also maintained reservations of its own. The more established the Zionist Yishuv became in Mandatory Palestine, the more political reservations the Vatican added to its initial theological inhibitions.

In 1949, Pius appointed Gori as Latin Patriarch of Jerusalem, which led to a policy of estrangement towards the Israeli government. Jerusalem being divided between Israel and Jordan, Gori began a policy of removing Catholic religious houses and institutions that were located in West Jerusalem to East Jerusalem, away from Israel. In 1950 Gori made an official visit to Israel and met Prime Minister Ben-Gurion. During the meeting, Gori attempted to convince the Israeli leader to make an international commitment to uphold the rights of Christians in Israel, but his offer was rejected. Gori was also active with Catholics of Jewish origin, and on 11 February 1955, granted official approval to the Apostolate of Saint James the Apostle, which was aimed at addressing the needs of Hebrew speaking Catholics in Israel.

On 26 May 1955, when the Israeli Philharmonic Orchestra performed Beethoven's Seventh Symphony at the Vatican as an act of respect for Pius XII, the Vatican still refrained from mentioning the name of the state, preferring instead to describe the orchestra as a collection of "Jewish musicians of fourteen different nationalities".

A different attitude towards Israeli policies was made by the Greek-Catholic Bishop of Acre (actually residing in Haifa) George Hakim, who served in that position from 1943. From 1949 onward, Hakim favored cooperation between the Israeli Arab Catholics and the Israeli government. In 1957 he even advocated in talks with Israeli officials that Arab Christians in Israel be drafted for military service. However, his suggestions were unpopular with both the Israeli government and Israeli Arab political leaders.

On 1 November 1956, Pius XII issued the encyclical Laetamur admodum, which expressed concern over the Suez Crisis, but without endorsing any particular solution.

=== John XXIII ===
John XXIII was Pope from 28 October 1958 to 3 June 1963. After 1944 as Nuncio to France, he played an active role in gaining Catholic Church support for the establishment of the state of Israel. His support for Zionism and the establishment of Israel was the result of his cultural and religious openness toward other faiths and cultures, and especially concern with the fate of Jews after the war. He was one of the Vatican's most sympathetic diplomats toward Jewish illegal immigration to Palestine, which he saw as a humanitarian issue, and not a matter of Biblical theology.

His papal encyclical Pacem in terris has at times been re-evaluated in the context of the Israeli-Palestinian conflict, as was done by John Paul II in his message for World Day of Peace of 2003 (par. 7).

Regarding relations with the State of Israel, no real moves were made under John XXIII.

=== Paul VI ===
Paul VI was Pope from 21 June 1963 to 6 August 1978. He strongly defended inter-religious dialogue in the spirit of Nostra aetate. He was also the first Pope to mention the Palestinian people by name.

He voiced mild criticism of the Israeli policy towards the Palestinians, while refraining from expressing any actual positions on the solution to the Arab-Israeli conflict. In January 1964, he was the first Pope in modern times to visit Jordan and Israel. He had expressed his wish to visit Israel already in November 1962, when serving as Archbishop of Milan, and in December 1963 he announced such an intention as Pope. The visit took place in January 1964. It was a clear expression of avoidance vis-a-vis any act that might be misconstrued as recognition of the State of Israel. Nostra aetate had not yet been promulgated. Its aim, beyond the act of pilgrimage, was the meeting with the Greek-Orthodox Ecumenical Patriarch Athenagoras in Jerusalem. He also met the Israeli President near Meggido, but Vatican official statements regarding the visit refrained from mentioning the State of Israel by name, rather referring to "the Holy Land".

In October 1969, the Pope met at the Vatican Israeli Foreign Minister Abba Eban. On 15 January 1973, the Pope met Israeli Prime Minister Golda Meir at the Vatican, which was the first meeting between a Pope and an Israeli Prime Minister. At the meeting, the Pope brought up the issues of peace in the Middle East, refugees and the status of the holy places, but no agreement was reached. According to Meir's own account of the meeting, the Pope criticized the Israeli government for its treatment of the Palestinians, and she said in reply:

Your Holiness, do you know what my earliest memory is? A pogrom in Kiev. When we were merciful and when we had no homeland and when we were weak, we were led to the gas chambers.

Following the Yom Kippur War in October 1973, the Vatican attempted to mediate between the Israeli and Syrian governments on prisoners exchange. He would later voice his concern to Egyptian President Sadat, to the Syrian Ambassador to the Vatican, and to King Hussein of Jordan.

In 1978, he held a reception for Israeli Minister of Foreign Affairs Moshe Dayan on 12 January 1978, in which he expressed his concern for the Holy Places and the internationalization of Jerusalem.

=== John Paul I ===
The Pontificate of John Paul I – brief as it was – took place at a time when the Israeli and the Egyptian governments were conducting exploratory peace talks. In the general audience he gave on 6 September 1978, he supported the Camp David negotiations, and repeated that support in his Sunday sermon of 10 September 1978.

=== John Paul II ===
John Paul II conducted a policy of continuing the dialogue with Jewish organizations while criticizing the Israeli government for lack of progress in the peace process.

==== Relations since 1993 ====
The opening towards the State of Israel by the Vatican was partially a result of Israel's effective control over the entire Holy City since 1967. This forced the Vatican to introduce a pragmatic dimension to its well-known declaratory policy of political denial. Hence, since 1967, Vatican diplomacy vis-à-vis Israel began to waver between two parameters:

- A policy of strict and consequent non-recognition of Israel's sovereignty over Jerusalem, far beyond the usual interpretation of international law, as the Holy See still embraces its own ideas regarding the special status of Jerusalem.
- A pragmatic policy, through which Catholic interests can best be served by having a working relationship with the party who exercises effective authority and control in Jerusalem.

The establishment of full diplomatic relations in 1993–94, on the other hand, was a belated political consequence of the pastoral approach towards Judaism as reflected in Nostra aetate. It was also a result of the new political reality, which began with the Madrid Conference and later continued with the Oslo peace process, after which the Vatican could not continue to ignore a State that even the Palestinians had initiated formal relations with.

Personal inclinations were also a decisive factor, such as the long-standing personal aspiration of Pope John-Paul II and Cardinal Ratzinger, who had participated in the Special Committee of the Holy See that reviewed and authorized the establishment of full relations between Israel and the Vatican. After the decision was made, Ratzinger reportedly called his Jerusalem acquaintance, Professor Zwi Werblowsky to express his joy over the development, describing it as the fruit of the work of the Second Vatican Ecumenical Council.

==== Papal visit of 2000 ====
On 15 February 2000, the Holy See concluded a basic agreement with the PLO as representing the Palestinians.

John Paul II visited Israel in March 2000, within the framework of the Third Millennium celebrations. The long-time pre-announced Papal visit took place without a formal invitation – the Pope's personal desire overruling objections held by his advisors and of local Palestinian Catholics. The program included – among others – acts of recognition de facto by visiting the President at his official residence in Jerusalem. His personal affection towards Jews was demonstrated by the longer than planned visit at Yad Vashem, as he spoke to Holocaust survivors from Kraków. His dramatic gesture of asking forgiveness from God at the Western Wall extended upon his visit a historical dimension.

A major change in the Vatican attitude towards the Hebrew Catholic community in Israel took place when, in August 2003, the Vatican appointed Bishop Jean-Baptiste Gourion as an Auxiliary Bishop to attend to the needs of the Hebrew Catholic community in Israel.

=== Benedict XVI ===
While the Papacy of John Paul II was marked by (and perhaps an agent of) one major historical event – the fall of the Iron Curtain, Benedict XVI's has been characterized by a plethora of current affairs – some influencing the Holy See directly, some indirectly. He has personally found himself at the helm of the implosion. Global news media has covered events that were instigated long before his time, such as the mismanagement of Vatican finances, Catholic sex abuse cases, the development of relations with the Russian Orthodox Church – on one hand – and the strains with the Anglican Church, on the other, and – above all – the rising incidence of acute violence instigated against Catholics in (mainly) Muslim countries.

Moreover, Ratzinger's outspoken intellect and concrete opinions on a wide range of subjects often places him at the focal point of world attention, sometimes subjecting him to the media fallout that would be inevitable under the best of circumstances. Little surprise, then, that the Israeli aspect of the Middle East is not foremost on his agenda.

And yet, Pope Benedict XVI has declared that he wishes to maintain a positive Christian-Jewish and Vatican-Israel relationship. Indeed, on the occasion of the 60th anniversary of the Jewish state, Benedict stated: "The Holy See joins you in giving thanks to the Lord that the aspirations of the Jewish people for a home in the land of their fathers have been fulfilled", which may be seen as a theological justification of the return of the Jewish People to Israel – indeed, an acceptance that has placed all previous Catholic denials of Zionism in the shade. On the other hand, he has also stressed the political neutrality of the Holy See in internal Mideast conflicts. Like John Paul II, he was disappointed by the non-resolution of the 1993 Fundamental Accord; and like his predecessor, he also expressed support for a Palestinian state alongside Israel.

Notwithstanding, many other diplomatic difficulties have arisen due to affairs not related to Israeli–Vatican topics, in the strictest sense of the term.

==== Beatification of Pope Pius XII ====
The cause for the canonization of Pius XII was opened by Pope Paul VI on 18 November 1965; Pope John Paul II declared him a Servant of God in 1990; and Benedict XVI declared him Venerable on 19 December 2009 – the same day as Pope John Paul II.

Although Pope Benedict XVI initially decided to "shelve" Pius XII's cause for sainthood until the archives from his papacy were opened to researchers in 2014, Robert Wistrich, the only Israeli on the International Catholic-Jewish Historical Commission, wrote in Haaretz that Ratzinger regards Pius XII "as a soulmate ... a venerated role model ... and a great admirer of the German Catholic Church".

The official Israeli response towards the matter has been that canonization is an internal church matter, even if there are reservations about the Pope's activities before, during and after the war.

==== The Society of St. Pius X and the Bishop Williamson affair ====
The Society of Saint Pius X (SSPX) was founded in 1970 by the French archbishop, Marcel Lefebvre to oppose changes in the Catholic Church after the Second Vatican Council. Lefebvre aroused the ire of the Holy See in 1988, when he consecrated four bishops, against the orders of Pope John Paul II, who were immediately excommunicated.

In January 2009, wishing to heal the rift with the society, Pope Benedict XVI lifted the excommunications, stirring outrage both in Israel and amidst world Jewry, since one of the four bishops, Richard Williamson, was a Holocaust denier. In January 2009, the Chief Rabbinate of Israel suspended contacts with the Vatican, and on 4 February 2009, German prosecutors announced the launch of a criminal investigation into Williamson's statements.

In response to the affair, Pope Benedict XVI stated that he deplored anti-Semitism, and Vatican officials stated that they had not been aware of Williamson's views prior to the lifting of the excommunication.

==== Covenant and Mission controversy ====
In June 2009, the United States Conference of Catholic Bishops (USCCB), issued "A Note On Ambiguities Contained in Reflections On Covenant and Mission", a document suggesting that interfaith dialogue should be used as an opportunity to evangelize Jewish interlocutors. The original 2002 Covenant and Mission document specified that Jews should not be sought for conversion. The ADL issued its response on 18 August:

something has changed over the past three years. The Vatican ship has shifted course, and the dialogue is backsliding ... the U.S. Conference of Catholic Bishops, without consultation or warning to their Jewish partners, issued "A Note on Ambiguities Contained in Reflections on Covenant and Mission," which rejected a clear statement that there can be no attempts to convert Jews as part of the interfaith dialogue ... (and) that the Vatican had officially affirmed its decision to jettison a teaching in the American adult catechism that the "covenant that God made with the Jewish people through Moses remains eternally valid for them ... a one-two punch against a continuing trust in the permanence of the Catholic Church's reform in its teachings about Jews

On 26 October 2009, the USCCB decided to remove the problematic phrases from the revised document, stating that interfaith dialogue "has never been and will never be used by the Catholic Church as a means of proselytism ... nor is it a disguised invitation to baptism".

==== Papal visit of 2009 ====
Without doubt, though, the positive highlight of Ratzinger's Papacy was the May 2009 visit of Pope Benedict XVI to Jordan, Israel and the Palestinian Authority – although this trip had at first been put in doubt because of persistent political fighting in Gaza.

In November 2008, the first operative steps were set in motion in order to implement Pope Benedict's long-standing desire to visit Israel and the Holy Land. By securing official invitations from all the heads of state in question (i.e. the King of Jordan, the President of Israel and the President of the PA), however, the Holy See gave the visit a political dimension. This served as additional proof that the Holy See was aiming for a political visit beyond the religious and pastoral dimension.

Papal motivation for the visit may be gauged by the fact that impediments, such as Operation "Cast Lead", the Williamson affair, or the historical dispute regarding a Pius XII exhibition at Yad Vashem, endangered the visit. An uncontrolled initiative of the Rabbi in charge of the Western Wall not to allow bearing crosses during the Papal visit was thwarted at an early stage. At the Notre Dame Centre in Jerusalem, the same Imam Tamimi who had spoiled a similar inter-religious event during the papal visit in 2000, delivered an anti-Jewish invective in front of Pope Benedict, who interrupted the meeting by leaving earlier than planned.

Gestures that could mean upgrading relations with Israel, were taken into account as well. Before entering Israel, the Pope made an unexpected gesture in his speech on Arab-Muslim soil on Mt. Nebo, invoking Moses, the Promised Land and its link to the chosen people, implying – perhaps – the Christians. Moreover, on the same occasion he stressed the inseparable link of Christianity to the Jewish people while invoking their common heritage of the Tanach (Old Testament) and their common tradition of pilgrimage.

In Jerusalem, Benedict XVI paid a courtesy visit to the presidential residence, a gesture that was absent in Jordan and in the PA. In the newly designed presidential garden, both the host and the papal guest planted an olive tree. In his remarkable farewell speech, Pope Benedict raised the planting of the olive tree in Jerusalem to the rank of a symbolic act, saying:

Mr President, you and I planted an olive tree at your residence on the day that I arrived in Israel. The olive tree, as you know, is an image used by Saint Paul to describe the very close relations between Christians and Jews. Paul describes in his Letter to the Romans how the Church of the Gentiles is like a wild olive shoot, grafted onto the cultivated olive tree that is the People of the Covenant (cf. 11:17–24). We are nourished from the same spiritual roots. We meet as brothers, brothers who at times in our history have had a tense relationship, but now are firmly committed to building bridges of lasting friendship.

During the reception that was held for him in Bethlehem on 13 May, the Pope said:

the Holy See supports the right of your people to a sovereign Palestinian homeland in the land of your forefathers, secure and at peace with its neighbors, within internationally recognized borders.

The political positions of the Holy See towards the PA and Israel were balanced. In his farewell speech before leaving to Rome on 15 May 2009, this balance was expressed as follows:

Let it be universally recognized that the State of Israel has the right to exist, and to enjoy peace and security within internationally agreed borders. Let it be likewise acknowledged that the Palestinian people have a right to a sovereign independent homeland, to live with dignity and to travel freely.

=== Francis ===
Pope Francis met at the Vatican Israeli president Shimon Peres on 30 April 2013. During a meeting with Israeli Deputy Foreign Minister Ze'ev Elkin on 6 June 2013, the Pope announced it was his intention to visit Israel, but did not specify a date. On 3 December 2013, the pope met Israeli Prime Minister Benjamin Netanyahu at the Vatican. During that visit, Netanyahu invited the Pope to visit Israel. Pope Francis visited Israel in May 2014.

Following an election in Israel in which Netanyahu declared that "no Palestinian state would be established on his watch", the Vatican announced it would approve a treaty that includes recognition of the State of Palestine, rather than referring to Palestinians as the "Palestine Liberation Organization". The New York Times noted the recognition could lend "significant symbolic weight to an intensifying Palestinian push for international support for sovereignty that bypasses the paralyzed negotiations with Israel". The Vatican ultimately did end up recognizing Palestine on 12 May 2015.

On 28 October 2015, Francis met with the World Jewish Congress and declared: "To attack Jews is anti-Semitism, but an outright attack on the State of Israel is also anti-Semitism. There may be political disagreements between governments and on political issues, but the State of Israel has every right to exist in safety and prosperity".

During the ongoing Gaza war (2023–present), Francis and the Vatican generally condemned Israel's actions in the Gaza Strip, angering Israel. Francis described the IDF killings of two Christians inside the Holy Family Catholic Church in Gaza as "terrorism". Throughout the war, Francis called for an immediate ceasefire, the release of all hostages, and a two-state solution. In 2024, Pope Francis suggested that the international community should study whether Israel's campaign in Gaza is a genocide of the Palestinian people.

=== Leo XIV ===
Pope Leo XIV expressed in public sympathy with the Palestinian cause, while maintaining sympathy towards Jewish suffering in the past. Throughout 2025, he condemned antisemitism in all its forms. He also displayed understanding of the suffering of the Palestinians in the Gaza Strip due to the Israel-Gaza war.

== See also ==
- Catholicism and Zionism
- Catholic Church in Israel
- Custodian of the Holy Land
- Holy See–Palestine relations
- Latin Patriarch of Jerusalem
- International recognition of Israel
- Relations between Catholicism and Judaism
- Israeli Christians
- Task Force for International Cooperation on Holocaust Education, Remembrance, and Research
- Mordechay Lewy
- Roman Jews
- Papal Jews
