= Catholicism and Zionism =

Interaction between Catholicism and the Zionist movement

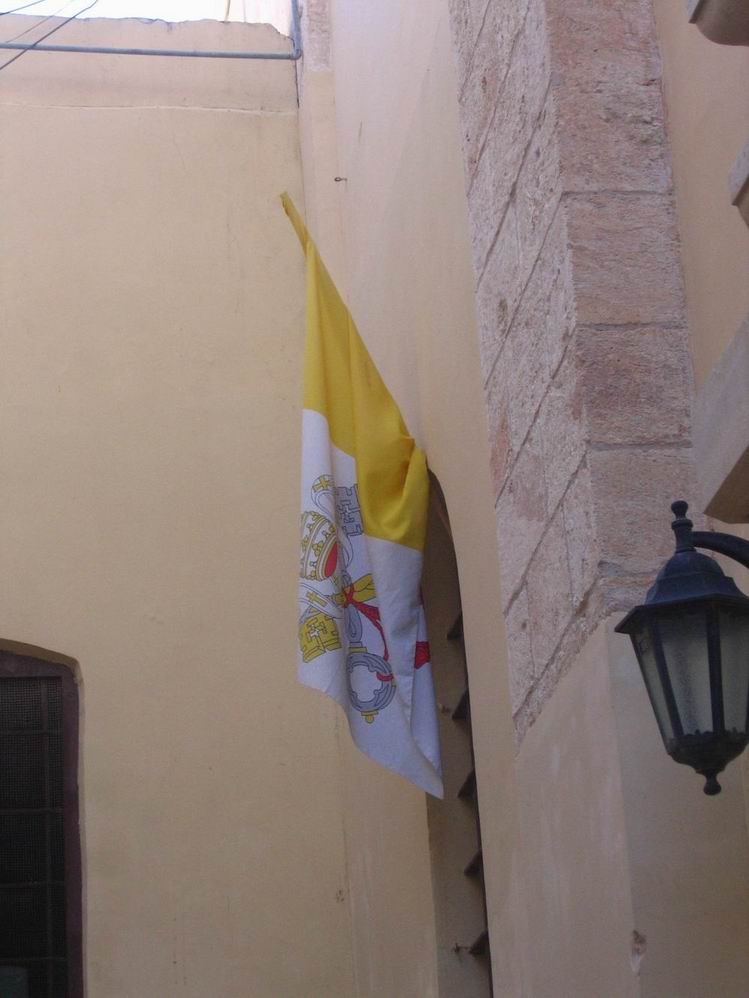
A Vatican flag on display in Nazareth, Israel

Catholicism – the largest branch of Christianity in the world – has a history of interaction with Zionism – the Jewish nationalist ideology that began as a movement for a Jewish state in the southern Levant, and which today serves as the "guiding ideology" of its successful creation, the State of Israel.

The relationship between Catholicism and Zionism includes theological, historical, and social aspects, and has sometimes overlapped with Catholic–Jewish relations. The geographic region of Palestine is of profound religious importance to Catholics, who consider it the Holy Land, and of profound national importance to Zionists, through its historical and religious role as the Land of Israel.

The Catholic Church rejects a theological basis for Zionism, and historically opposed it. Nonetheless, the Vatican (Note: The Holy See, which governs Vatican City, has ecclesiastical jurisdiction over the entire Catholic Church.) opened diplomatic relations with the Israeli state in 1993, a decision based in recognition of political and civic reality, rather than on Christian Zionist theology. Today, the Vatican recognizes both Israel and the State of Palestine, and advocates for a two-state solution. Importantly, Catholic doctrine does not formally dictate its adherents' individual political attitudes towards Israel's existence. Therefore, a diversity of worldwide Catholic opinion on the subject exists.

Also of relevance is the role of Catholic figures in the Israeli–Palestinian conflict, both in the region and outside it, as well as Israeli attitudes and practices towards the Vatican and local Catholics.

== Theological and scriptural discourse ==
=== The Land of Israel as divinely ordained ===
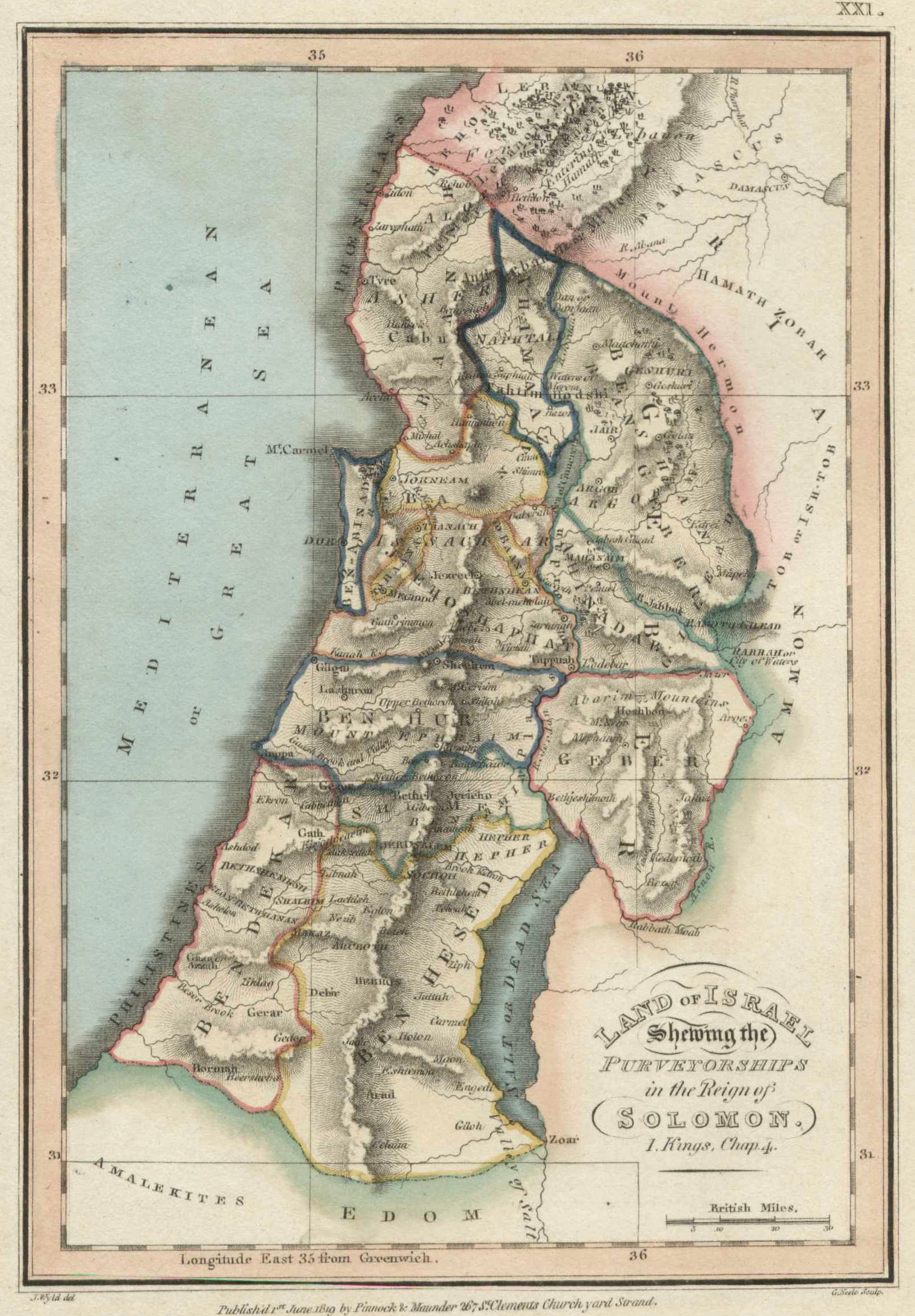
Map depicting the traditional Land of Israel

Zionists who are religiously Jewish consider Zionism and Judaism to be inseparable and the former to be a central component of the latter. As evidence, they point to the continuous role of the Land of Israel as the God-given national territory of the Israelite, and later Jewish, people throughout the entire Tanakh; and the concept of a return to the land as a regular feature of religious practices in the Jewish diaspora. Non-Catholic Christian Zionists similarly believe that the land is divinely ordained for the Jews, but that the return of Jewish sovereignty anticipates the Second Coming of Jesus. At the core of these beliefs is the biblical narrative of Genesis 12, where Abraham is selected by God to go to Canaan and become the father of a nation; this is interpreted as the starting point for a divinely ordained Jewish peoplehood in their own defined national territory.

Some elements within the Catholic Church, particularly in Europe and North America, lobby to affirm the Zionist claim over the Land of Israel as theologically valid. Gavin D'Costa, a Catholic Zionist, writes that any attempt by the Church to endorse theologically based Zionism would be met with overwhelming hostility by Christians in the Middle East.

=== The Land of Israel as not divinely ordained ===
The Catholic Church rejects the premise that the Jewish people have a divine right to possess sovereignty over the Holy Land. The Second Vatican Council's lumen gentium (1964) affirms that the Church is the "new Israel" and "new people of God" that is not bound by ethnicity or blood. In 1985, the Vatican's “Notes on the Correct Presentation of Jews and Judaism” would build on this, declaring that the special relationship between God and the Jewish people remained intact. It also recognized Judaism's perennial connection to the Land of Israel, yet simultaneously affirmed that this connection was religiously irrelevant to Christians:

... the history of Israel did not end in 70 A.D. It continued, especially in a numerous Diaspora which allowed Israel to carry to the whole world a witness—often heroic—of its fidelity to the one God and to ‘exalt Him in the presence of all the living’ (Tobit 13:4), while preserving the memory of the land of their forefathers at the heart of their hope (Passover Seder). Christians are invited to understand this religious attachment which finds its roots in Biblical tradition, without however making their own any particular religious interpretation of this relationship.

Therefore, in the Catholic understanding, this continuing relationship between God and the Jewish people still excludes any divine land-based promise–namely, in the present day, the Israeli state's claims–as theologically valid. Rabbi David Rosen has criticized the Church's approach, commenting that if it intends "to fully respect Jewish self-understanding, it is also necessary to appreciate the centrality that the land of Israel plays in the historic and contemporary religious life of the Jewish people and that appears to be missing.

Addressing the question of why possession of the Land of Israel is not viewed by the Catholic Church as part of the "irrevocable" covenant between God and the Jewish people, as stated in Romans 11, Matthew A. Tsakanikas, a Catholic anti-Zionist, writes that:

... in no way can the establishment of a modern State of Israel be confused with the fulfillment of the promises given to Abraham because Jesus is the true fulfillment of those promises... we speak of Israel being reconstituted and not of Israel being replaced in supersessionism... religious grounds for claims of a physical Land are also obsolete since the Messiah [Jesus] became the Temple and sign of the Land... the racially and ceremonially defined Israel of Moses was only a start in order to reach the ultimate spiritual Israel, the Mystical Body of the Messiah.

In the New Testament, part of Christian but not Jewish biblical scripture, the focus on the importance of land that was constant throughout the Old Testament changes in favor of a more spiritual, less geographically defined concept. This is typified by the Beatitudes (Matthew 5:3-10); heaven being seen as the true Christian homeland (Hebrews 11:13-16); and the bringing down of ethnic and religious borders between the Jews (Note: That is, the Jews who adopted Christianity.) and Gentiles under Jesus (Ephesians 2:14-18).

== Catholic anti-Zionism ==
Catholic anti-Zionism has taken several forms, including opposition to the establishment of Jewish sovereignty in Palestine, rejection of a theological interpretation of Zionism, and criticism of policies associated with the Zionist movement or the State of Israel. Historians have associated the early Vatican position with concern for Christian holy places and Catholic institutions, competition with Protestant powers, the support of some local clergy for Palestinian Arab nationalism, and anti-Jewish assumptions then present in Catholic discourse. Paolo Zanini writes that much of the Catholic establishment in Mandatory Palestine regarded Zionism as a threat to the Arab national cause, the Catholic position at the holy sites, and the continuation of Christian life in the region.

The prospect of British rule also raised concern over Protestant missionary influence. In 1917, the Italian jurist Francesco Scaduto argued that the Holy See privately regarded Muslim government in Palestine as preferable to Protestant rule, since the established arrangements under Muslim authorities were considered less threatening to Catholic interests. This preference was not a general endorsement of Muslim government, but reflected contemporary Catholic rivalry with Protestant missions and concern over control of the Christian holy places.

Following the Balfour Declaration, Pope Benedict XV addressed the future of Palestine in a consistorial allocution of 10 March 1919. He opposed granting the Jewish population a privileged position over Christians and objected to Christian sanctuaries being placed under non-Christian authority. Cardinal Secretary of State Pietro Gasparri subsequently told the Belgian representative to the Holy See that the Vatican's principal concern was the possible creation of a Jewish state. Gasparri distinguished this from Jewish immigration and the establishment of agricultural settlements, to which he said the Holy See did not object in themselves.

During the period in which the Holy See withheld diplomatic recognition from Israel, the Holy See established formal relations with a number of Muslim-majority states. Relations with Egypt were established in 1947, followed by Indonesia in 1950 and Iran and Syria in 1953. Full diplomatic relations with Israel followed the signing of the Fundamental Agreement in December 1993 and were implemented in 1994. This came only after the Palestinian Liberation Organization (PLO) had already recognized the State of Israel.

Opposition to Catholic or Christian Zionism has remained prominent within the Catholic hierarchy in the Holy Land. At a March 2025 meeting with King Abdullah II of Jordan, Bishop William Shomali, the general vicar of the Latin Patriarchate of Jerusalem, participated on behalf of Latin Patriarch Cardinal Pierbattista Pizzaballa. Shomali presented the Catholic Church's rejection of interpretations of the Torah that treat biblical promises as granting the Jewish people an exclusive present-day political entitlement to Palestine, associating this interpretation with American Christian Zionism. He instead characterized the Old Testament as a call to defend the poor and oppressed and to establish justice and peace.

Following an Israeli strike on the Holy Family Church compound in Gaza City in July 2025, Leo said that the attack by the Israeli army added to ongoing military attacks against civilians and places of worship in Gaza, and called for an immediate end to the barbarism of the war. He has also called for the release of hostages held in Gaza, a permanent ceasefire, humanitarian aid, and respect for international humanitarian law. He also appealed for compliance with international humanitarian law, citing prohibitions on collective punishment, indiscriminate force, and forced displacement.

== Catholic Zionism ==
The phenomenon of Catholic Zionism emerged after 1948, when the Israeli state was established, and traces its origins to the Second Vatican Council's change in stance concerning the Jewish people. Jimmy Akin writes that despite the Catholic Church's refusal to endorse Zionism on a theological basis, an individual Catholic opining that Jews have a right to the Land of Israel due to God’s promise is "within the realm of permitted theological speculation".

Gavin D'Costa writes that Catholic Zionism has as its theological foundation "the unconditional gift of the election of the Jewish people" and the "biblical vision" of Jewish governance in the Holy Land, but is unique in several ways that distinguish it from traditional Protestant Christian Zionism. According to D'Costa, it affirms that Jewish sovereignty over the Land of Israel is conditional, based on Leviticus 18:28: “If you defile the land, it will vomit you out as it vomited out the nations that were before you.” This differentiates Catholic Zionism from "the eschatological confidence of many Protestants who imagine the State of Israel as the fulfillment of prophecies about the end times." Catholic Zionism is also sympathetic to Palestinian concerns, and envisions Jewish governance in the Holy Land as possible in a binational sense or as part of a larger multinational framework, not having to strictly take the form of the present Israeli nation-state.

In 2025, a rift emerged between Kairos Palestine, which is Catholic-led but composed of Catholic, Orthodox, and Protestant Palestinians, and the United States Conference of Catholic Bishops (USCCB). This occurred after the USCCB released a joint publication with the American Jewish Committee which meant to "condemn antisemitism and educate Catholics on antisemitic phrases and beliefs". Kairos Palestine condemned the publication as "theologically and morally wrong" and dismissed a defense of the document by Archbishop Timothy Broglio, president of the USCCB.

== History of the Vatican's political approach to Zionism ==
=== Before 1948 ===
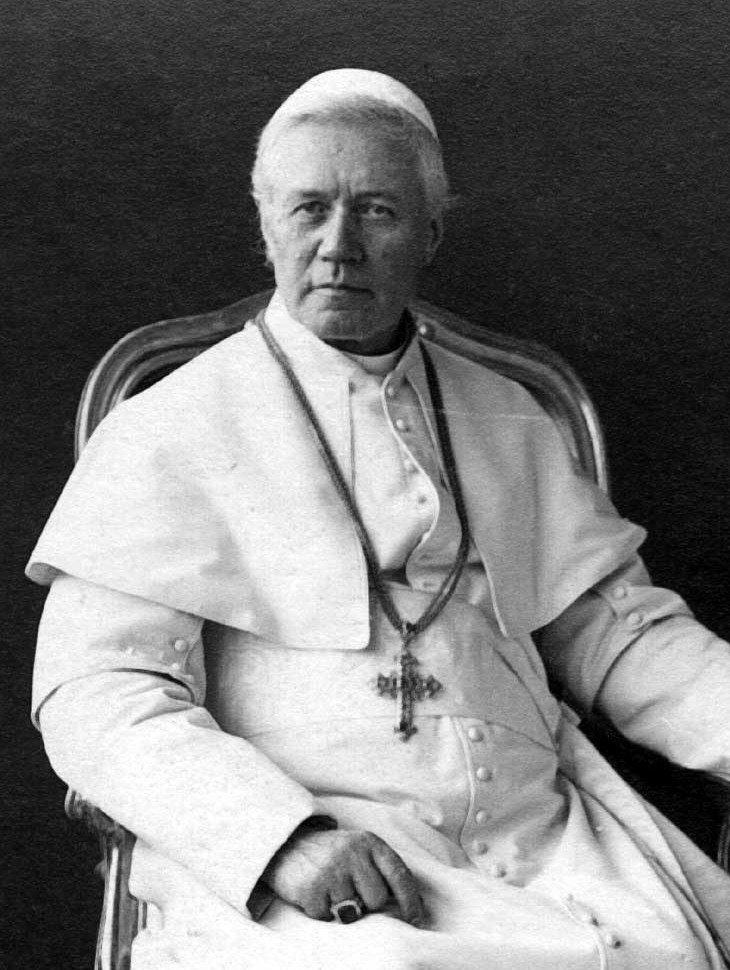
Pope Pius X in 1905

Traditional Vatican opposition to Zionism stemmed largely from a theological basis. Theodor Herzl, the secular Jewish founder of modern political Zionism, met with Pope Pius X in the Vatican in 1904, arranged by the Austrian Count Berthold Dominik Lippay, to ascertain the Catholic Church's position on Herzl's prospective project for a Jewish state in Palestine. Pope Pius X told Herzl:

We cannot prevent Jews from going to Jerusalem—but we can never sanction it... if Jerusalem's land was not always hallowed, it has been sanctified by Jesus Christ's life. I cannot tell you otherwise as the leader of the Church. Because the Jews have not recognized our Lord, we cannot recognize the Jewish people.

Pope Pius X went on to tell Herzl that the Catholic Church also opposed the acquisition of the "secular lands" of Palestine by the Zionist movement. This laid down some of the key religious components of the Catholic Church's opposition of Zionism which would take on more of a political character as the planning of Jewish state in the Holy Land took place beginning in 1917 with the Balfour Declaration. The Vatican was a strong opponent of the League of Nations' plans for a Jewish state in the Holy Land, believing that the dominance of Judaism over a land sacred to Catholics would be an offense.

During World War II the Vatican made sure that any effort it took part in to aid the Jewish people threatened by Nazi Germany would not be construed as support for a Jewish homeland in the Holy Land. On 22 June 1943, Amleto Giovanni Cicognani, the Apostolic Delegate to the United States, wrote to American president Franklin D. Roosevelt, asking him to prevent the establishment of a Jewish state in Palestine:

In this question two points must be considered. The first concerns the Holy Places (for example, the Basilica of the Holy Sepulcher, Bethlehem, etc.). Catholics rejoice in certain rights regarding these places and in justice their rights must be recognized, and respected. Repeated formal assurances that these rights will be respected are ever necessary and will again be required after the present war,

The second point concerns Palestine itself. Catholics the world over are piously devoted to this country, hallowed as it was by the presence of the Redeemer and esteemed as it is as the cradle of Christianity. If the greater part of Palestine is given to the Jewish people, this would be a severe blow to the religious attachment of Catholics to this land. To have the Jewish people in the majority would be to interfere with the peaceful exercise of these rights in the Holy Land already vested in Catholics.

It is true that at one time Palestine was inhabited by the Hebrew Race, but there is no axiom in history to substantiate the necessity of a people returning to a country they left nineteen centuries before.

When the 1947 United Nations partition plan for Palestine was introduced, the Vatican decided to endorse at least the corpus separatum proposal within the plan, which would have made Jerusalem an international zone administered by the United Nations.

=== After 1948 ===
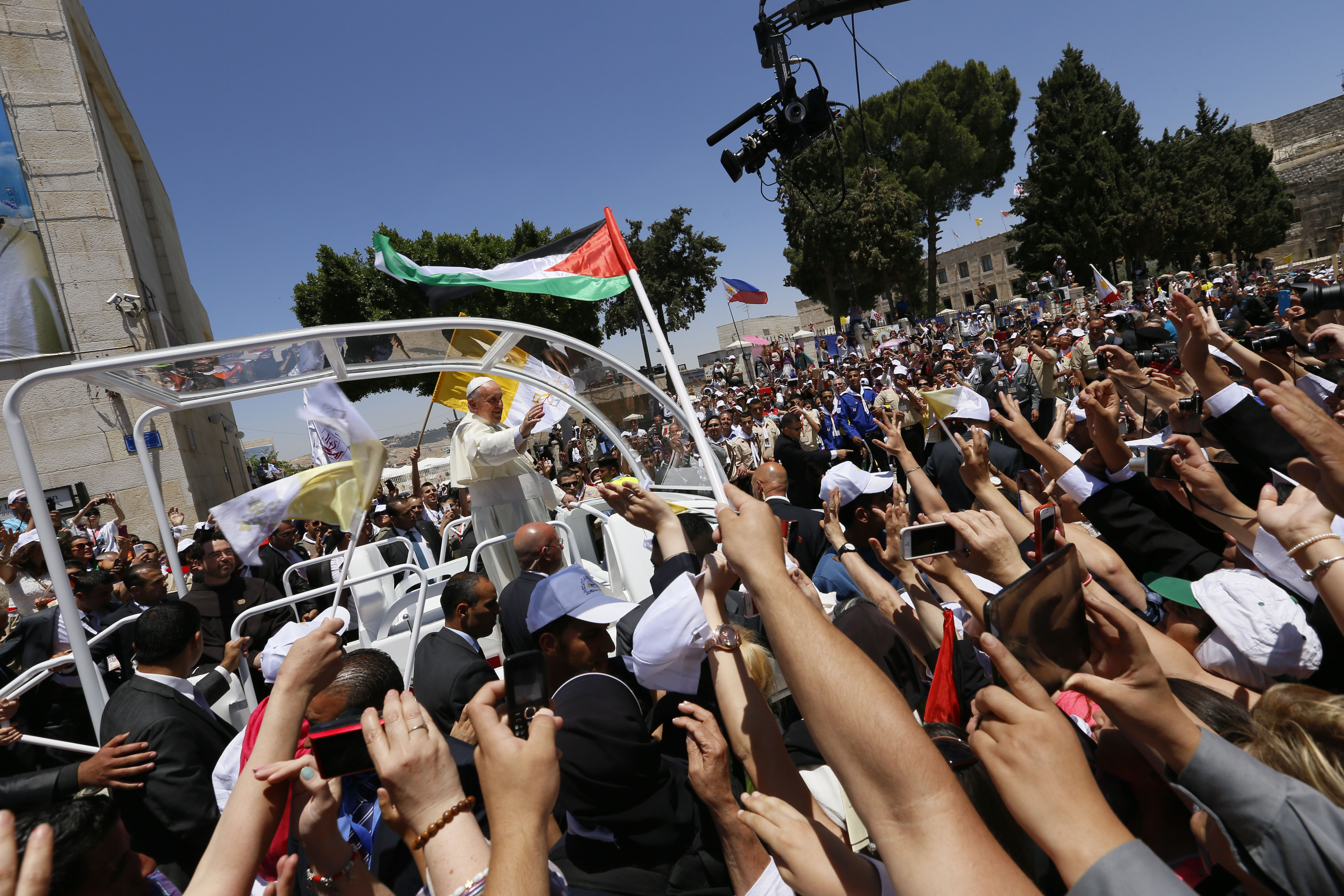
Pope Francis in Bethlehem, Palestine, in 2014

Under the pontificate of Pope Pius XII, the Catholic Church resisted American pressure to recognize the nascent Israeli state and, according to American historian Frank J. Coppa in his biographical study The Life and Pontificate of Pope Pius XII: Between History and Controversy, stood "in opposition to American policy in the Middle East from the founding of Israel to his death in 1958."

Under the reign of Pope John XXIII from 1958 to 1963, the Vatican moderated its political position on Zionism. Pope John XXIII, the architect of the Second Vatican Council, was deeply sympathetic to the Jewish people and secretly desired for the Vatican recognition of the Israeli state. The Israeli state reacted enthusiastically to news of his election, and at his coronation the Israeli ambassador Eliahu Sasson was in attendance, appointed as "Special Delegate of the Government of Israel".

The Vatican recognized the State of Israel in 1993 as a result of the Oslo Accords. The former perceived this as a necessary recognition of the new political and civic reality and not as a theological endorsement of the Zionist project. Since then, the official political position of the Vatican has been for the coexistence of an Israeli state and a Palestinian state side by side.

Following these developments, the Vatican likewise signed an agreement with the Palestine Liberation Organization (PLO) in 2000, under the reign of Pope John Paul II. This was succeeded by a 2015 agreement under the reign of Pope Francis, which recognized the State of Palestine. Despite Pope Francis' call for a two-state solution, there remains a diversity of opinion on the matter within the Holy See itself, as evidenced by Cardinal Fernando Filoni's 2024 statement that an "integrated" one-state solution with full rights for all inhabitants may be a better option than an increasingly unviable two-state solution.

== Catholics in the Israeli–Palestinian conflict ==
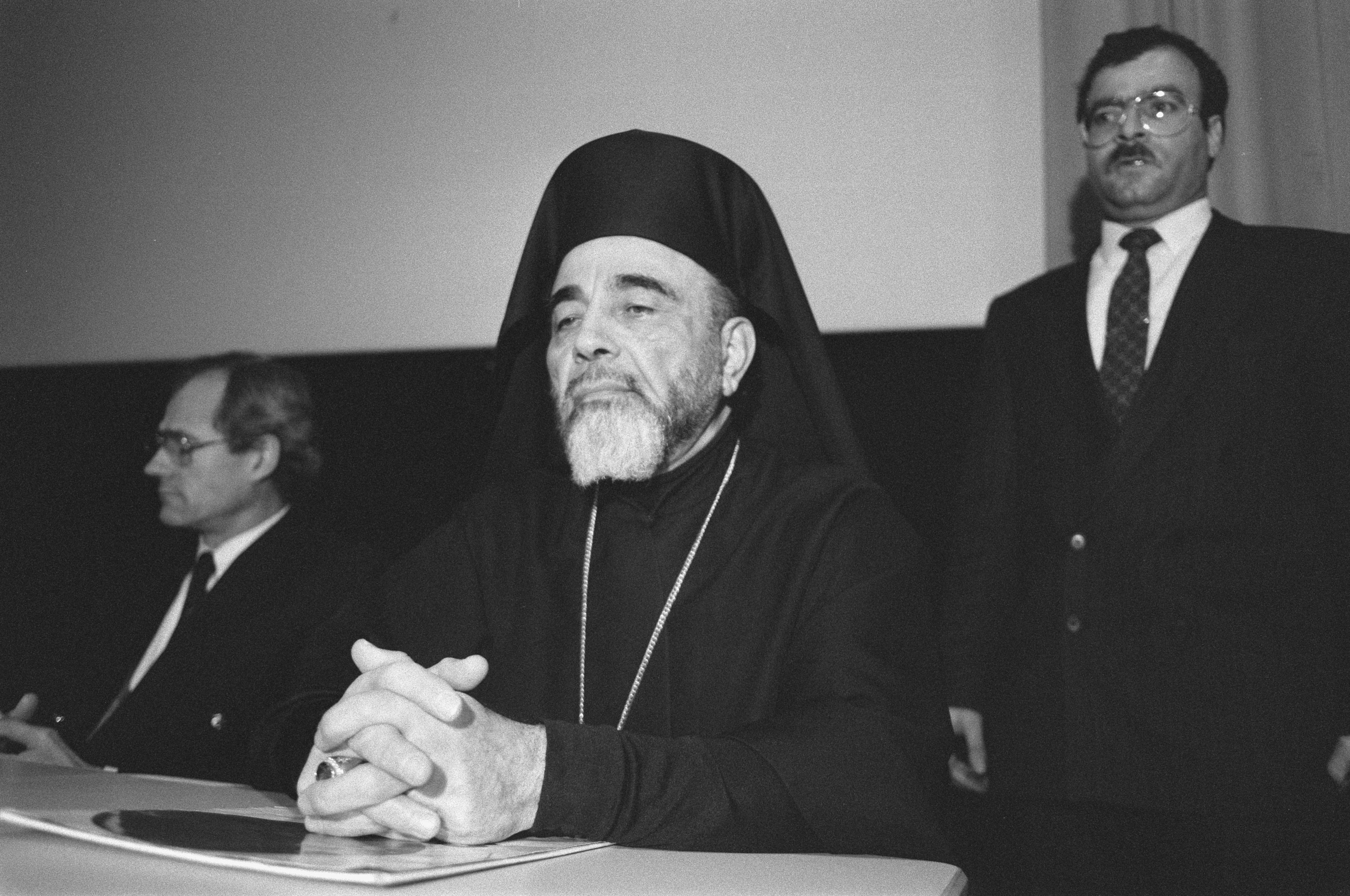
Archbishop Hilarion Capucci in 1988

The 1948 Palestine war and subsequent Palestinian expulsion and flight, which began the Nakba, sowed the seeds of a liberation theology among the Palestinian Christians. During the 1948 war, Alberto Gori, then the Franciscan Custodian of the Holy Land, accused Israeli forces of destroying the holy places, in his reports to the Vatican. Several Catholic-majority villages were subjected to war crimes by Israeli forces; Iqrit and Kafr Bir'im were forcibly depopulated and razed, and Al-Bassa and Eilabun were the sites of massacres.

By the 1970s, some Catholics were actively involved with Palestinian militancy. Nayef Hawatmeh, a Jordanian Catholic, founded the Democratic Front for the Liberation of Palestine (DFLP) in 1969 and still serves as its head. The Palestinian priest Manuel Musallam was involved with the fedayeen, was declared persona non grata by Israel, and became a Fatah leader. Hilarion Capucci, a Syrian archbishop, was arrested by Israel in 1974 for smuggling weapons to the Palestine Liberation Army, and was released in 1978 following the Vatican's intervention.

During the 2023–present Gaza war, the Hawatmeh-led DFLP has fought Israeli troops alongside its ally Hamas. In December 2023, Israeli forces operating in Gaza City killed a Catholic mother and daughter, Nahida and Samar Anton, inside the city's Holy Family Church. In response, Pope Francis referred to the Israeli actions as "terrorism". The killings, coupled with other incidents of Israeli attacks on Christian institutions in the Gaza Strip, aggravated tensions between the Vatican and Israel. In November 2024, Francis stated that the Israeli military campaign in the Gaza Strip appears to have "the characteristics of a genocide" and merits further investigation. Meanwhile, some Hebrew Catholics have served in the Israel Defense Forces (IDF) during the war.

== Other approaches ==
=== Preferential option for the poor ===
In an article for the Jesuit magazine America, Julie Schumacher Cohen and Jordan Denari Duffner argue for upholding the preferential option for the poor in the Israeli–Palestinian conflict without making mention of discourse around the scriptural legitimacy of a Jewish state in the Holy Land. The article states:

Catholic social teaching’s commitment to the inherent dignity of all persons and their right to life encourages us to be attentive to those who are most vulnerable, and to make assisting and accompanying them in their struggles a primary concern. Both Israelis and Palestinians suffer tremendously in the Holy Land—the two communities have experienced great trauma and violence. Still, the Palestinian loss of life is much higher, and they bear the brunt of an unequal system, which amounts to structural violence and discrimination... acknowledging these realities and advocating for Palestinian rights is wholly consistent with a commitment to ensuring the rights, safety and dignity of Jewish Israelis. Catholics have a responsibility to hold these commitments together.

=== Jewish Zionist commentary ===
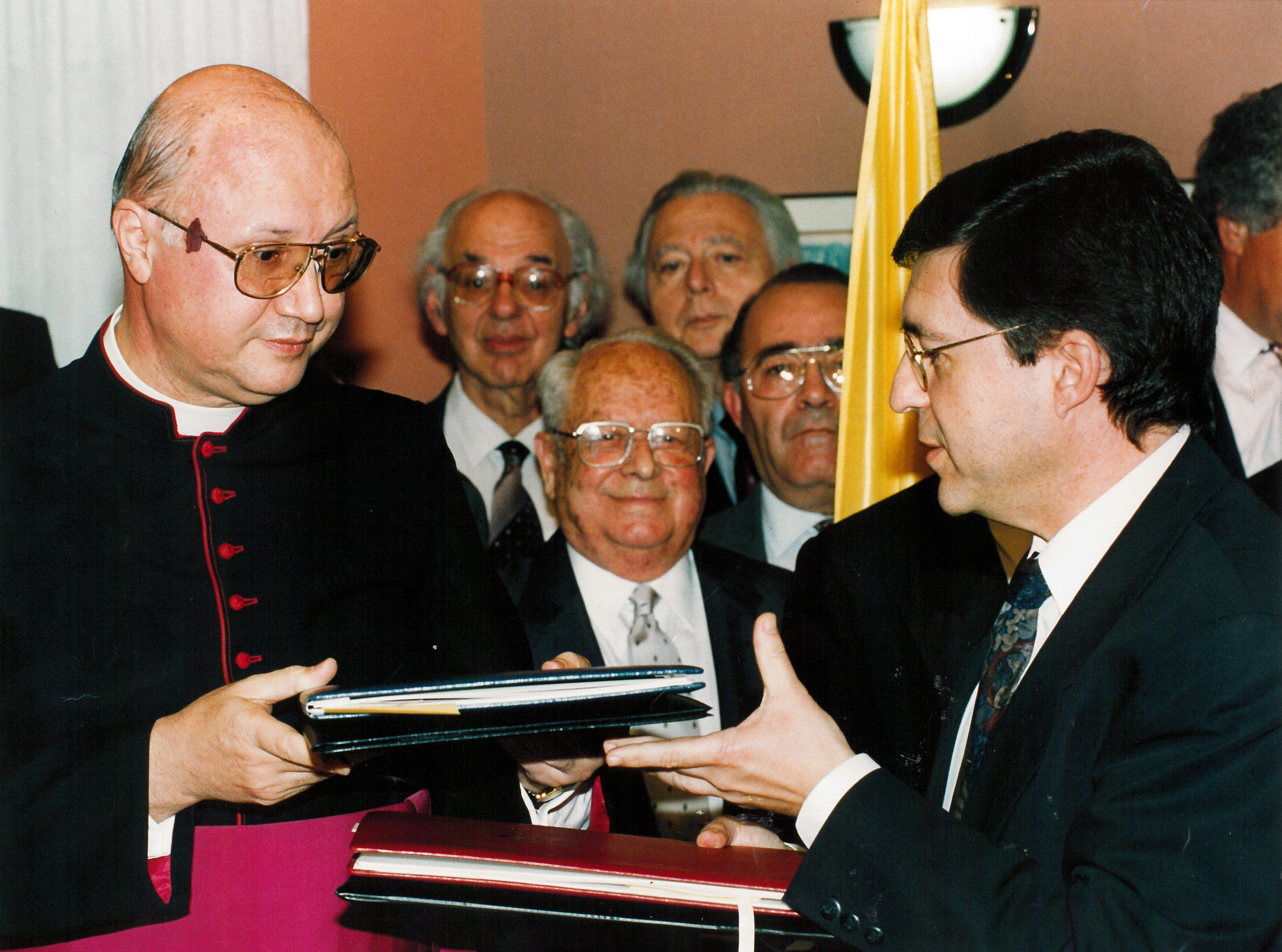
Representatives of Israel and Vatican City in 1993

Israelis tend to generally view the Vatican as too pro-Palestinian. A Vatican diplomatic source once said: "The Israelis believe that we never support them enough. But they demand unconditional support, which we cannot give".

In a February 2024 article for the Catholic Herald, Peter Oppenheimer partially defended ongoing Israeli operations in Gaza, and critiqued the effectiveness and sincerity of statements about the Gaza war from the Vatican, questioning whether they genuinely aim to promote peace or serve to enhance the Church’s moral authority.

In March 2025, the American rabbi Shmuley Boteach visited the Vatican and met with its secretary of state Cardinal Pietro Parolin. Boteach described his goal as "to persuade the church to formally recognize Israel as the biblical birthright of the Jewish people". What came of the meeting is unknown.

After the death of Pope Francis in April 2025, Droy Eydar, writing for Israel Hayom, stated that the pope "bears significant responsibility for the rise in global antisemitism since October 7".

=== Crusades comparison ===
Some Muslims have compared Zionism with the Catholic Church's medieval Crusaders, in the sense that both are seen as intruders into Palestine, which is perceived as rightfully belonging to Muslim rule (Dar al-Islam).

In a 2010 article for The New York Times, Ross Douthat stated:

The analogy between Israel and Outremer [the Crusader states] is usually drawn by Israel’s enemies: “Jews and Crusaders” is one of Osama bin Laden’s favorite epithets, and Palestinian radicals often pine for another Saladin to drive the Israelis into the sea. But Israel’s friends can learn something from Outremer as well. Like today’s Jewish republic, the Crusader kingdoms were small states forged by military valor, based in the Middle East but oriented westward, with distant patrons and potential foes just next door. Like Israel, they were magnets for fanatics from east and west alike. And when they eventually fell after surviving for longer than Israel has currently existed, it was for reasons that are directly relevant to the challenges facing the Israeli government today.

Scholar David Ohana says that a "Crusader anxiety" over the Zionist project ending in a destruction similar to that of the Crusader states has become "an intrinsic part of the Israeli psyche".

William L. Ochsenwald has written that an important Crusader motivation was retaking lost territory perceived as rightfully Catholic, similarly to how religious Jewish Zionists saw themselves as retaking lost territory perceived as rightfully Jewish. However, he states the insinuation that Israel's fate will be identical to the fate of the Crusader states should be opposed.

== See also ==
- Catholic Church in Israel
- Catholic Church in Palestine
- Haredim and Zionism
- Muslim supporters of Israel
- Religious anti-Zionism
