= Sambi =

Sambi may refer to:

- Ahmed Abdallah Mohamed Sambi (born 1958), former President of Comoros and Islamic leader
- Albert Sambi Lokonga (born 1998), Belgian professional footballer
- Pietro Sambi (1938–2011), Catholic archbishop and Vatican diplomat
