= List of ambassadors of Israel to the Holy See =

Israel and the Holy See established diplomatic relations by the Fundamental Agreement in 1993. This article lists all Israeli ambassadors to the Holy See.

== List of ambassadors ==
- Samuel Hadas 1994-1997
- Aharon Lopez 1997-2000
- Yosef Neville Lamdan 2000-2003
- Oded Ben-Hur 2003-2008
- Mordechay Lewy 2008-2012
- Zion Evrony 2012-2016
- Oren David 2016-2021
- Raphael Schutz 2021-2024
- Yaron Sideman 2024-present
