= Carlo Curis =

Italian prelate of the Catholic Church

His Excellency Carlo Curis
- Apostolic Nuncio Emeritus to Canada
- Church: Roman Catholic Church
- Installed: 28 March 1990
- Term ended: 4 February 1999
- Predecessor: Angelo Palmas
- Successor: Paolo Romeo
- Other post: Titular Archbishop of Medeli
- Previous posts: Apostolic Delegate to Jerusalem and Palestine (1984–1990); Apostolic Nuncio to Cyprus (1984–1990); Apostolic Nuncio to Nigeria (1978–1984); Apostolic Nuncio to Sri Lanka (1971–1978)

Orders
- Ordination: 13 July 1947
- Consecration: 3 October 1971 by Jean-Marie Villot

Personal details
- Born: 2 November 1923 La Maddalena, Italy
- Died: 29 September 2014 (aged 90) Rome, Italy

Carlo Curis (2 November 1923 – 29 September 2014) was an Italian prelate of the Catholic Church.

== Biography ==
Curis was born in La Maddalena, Italy, and ordained priest on 13 July 1947.

Curis was appointed Titular Archbishop of Medeli as well as Apostolic Delegate to Sri Lanka on 14 July 1971. He was consecrated on 3 October 1971.

Curis was appointed Apostolic Pro-Nuncio to Sri Lanka (1971), to Nigeria (1978), and to Cyprus (1984) as well as Apostolic Delegate to Jerusalem and Palestine on 4 February 1984. He was appointed Pro-Nuncio to Canada on 28 March 1990.

He retired upon the appointment of Paolo Romeo to succeed him on 5 February 1999.
