= Andrea Cordero Lanza di Montezemolo =

Italian prelate

His Eminence Andrea Cordero Lanza di Montezemolo
- Cardinal-Archpriest of the Saint Paul Outside-the-Walls Basilica
- Andrea Cordero Lanza di Montezemolo
- Church: Basilica of Saint Paul Outside the Walls
- Appointed: 31 May 2005
- Term ended: 3 July 2009
- Successor: Francesco Monterisi
- Previous posts: Titular Archbishop of Tuscania (1991–2006); Secretary of the Pontifical Council for Justice and Peace (1976–1977); Apostolic Pro-Nuncio to Papua New Guinea (1977–1980); Apostolic Nuncio to Nicaragua & Honduras (1980–1986); Apostolic Nuncio to Uruguay (1986–1990); Apostolic Nuncio to Israel, to Jerusalem and Palestine (1990–1998); Apostolic Nuncio to Italy & San Marino (1998–2001)

Orders
- Ordination: 13 March 1954 by Luigi Traglia
- Consecration: 4 June 1977 by Jean-Marie Villot
- Created cardinal: 24 March 2006 by Pope Benedict XVI
- Rank: Cardinal-Priest (pro hac vice) of Santa Maria in Portico

Personal details
- Born: Andrea Cordero Lanza di Montezemolo; 27 August 1925 Turin, Italy
- Died: 19 November 2017 (aged 92) Rome
- Denomination: Catholic
- Education: Pontifical Lateran University, Pontifical Ecclesiastical Academy, Pontifical Gregorian University
- Coat of arms: Andrea Cordero Lanza di Montezemolo's coat of arms

Andrea Cordero Lanza di Montezemolo (27 August 1925 – 19 November 2017) was an Italian prelate of the Catholic Church. He worked in the diplomatic service of the Holy See from 1977 until he retired in 2001. As Archpriest of the Basilica of Saint Paul Outside the Walls from 2005 to 2009 he helped oversee important restoration work. He was made a cardinal by Pope Benedict XVI on 24 March 2006.

== Family ==
Montezemolo was born in Turin, Italy of a noble family. His father Giuseppe was an Army officer, tortured and executed during the Ardeatine massacre for his role in resisting the Nazi occupation of Rome. During that year Andrea was kept hidden from the Nazis by the Ukrainian clergy in the Ukrainian Pontifical College of Saint Josaphat. Andrea and his sister Adriana have, on several occasions, been noted for their forgiveness of the perpetrators, notably Erich Priebke. He is related to Luca Cordero di Montezemolo, former president of Ferrari, former chairman of FIAT and chairman of Alitalia.

== Studies and priesthood ==
Montezemolo studied in Turin and Rome and fought in World War II. After the war, he pursued higher studies in architecture and was a professional and academic. He later discerned his vocation to the priesthood and pursued studies in theology and philosophy at the Pontifical Gregorian University. He also studied at the Pontifical Ecclesiastical Academy and obtained a doctorate in canon law from the Pontifical Lateran University.

== Diplomatic and curial service ==
In 1976 he was appointed Secretary of the Pontifical Council for Justice and Peace in the Roman Curia. On 5 April 1977 he was appointed Titular Archbishop of Pandosia and Apostolic Pro-Nuncio to Papua New Guinea and Apostolic Delegate to the Solomon Islands. On 25 October 1980 he was transferred as Apostolic Nuncio to Nicaragua and Honduras, and on 1 April 1986 to Uruguay.

On 28 April 1990, he became Apostolic Delegate to Jerusalem and Palestine and, one month later, also Pro-Nuncio to Cyprus. While he held this appointment, the 1993 Fundamental Agreement between the Holy See and the State of Israel was reached. This paved the way for establishing full diplomatic relations so that he became the first Nuncio to Israel. In 1999 Montezemolo was appointed Knight Grand Cross of the Order of Merit of the Italian Republic. His final diplomatic posting was as Nuncio to Italy and San Marino, to which he was named on 17 April 2001.

In 2005 he designed the coat of arms of Pope Benedict XVI and shortly afterwards, on 31 May 2005, was named Archpriest of the Basilica of Saint Paul Outside the Walls. As Archpriest he carried out, with the assistance of the Benedictine Monks of the Abbey of Saint Paul, important architectural work and restoration for the benefit of local Catholics and the pilgrims who come to the Basilica from various parts of the world. Pope Benedict XVI made him a cardinal in the consistory of 24 March 2006, as Cardinal-Deacon of Santa Maria in Portico. Montezemolo was already over eighty years of age and ineligible to vote in a conclave.

Styles of Andrea Cordero Lanza di Montezemolo
- Reference style: His Eminence
- Spoken style: Your Eminence
- Informal style: Cardinal
- See: Santa Maria in Portico

On 3 July 2009, Montezemolo was succeeded as Archpriest of the Basilica of Saint Paul Outside the Walls by Archbishop Francesco Monterisi, former secretary of the Congregation for Bishops.

In a 2013 interview, Montezemolo said that Pope Emeritus Benedict XVI needed a new coat of arms now that he was no longer the pontiff. “The problem now is whether the Pope Emeritus can keep that same coat of arms or not”. “And as a person who has always dedicated himself to this, I say ‘no’”. He drew up a new coat of arms, which he believed could be used by the former pontiff. He moved the big keys of Saint Peter from the back of the coat of arms to the top part of the shield and made them much smaller. “But this is only a proposal, it isn’t official,” Montezemolo qualified.

Pope Francis visited him in a Rome nursing home in 2016. Montezemolo died on 19 November 2017. He was 92.

Catholic Church titles
First	Apostolic Nuncio to Israel; 19 January 1994 – 7 March 1998	Succeeded by Pietro Sambi
Preceded by Francesco Colasuonno	Apostolic Nuncio to Italy and San Marino; 7 March 1998 – 17 April 2001	Succeeded by Paolo Romeo
First	Archpriest of the Basilica of Saint Paul Outside the Walls; 31 May 2005 – 3 July 2009	Succeeded by Francesco Monterisi
