= Apostolic Nunciature to Israel =

Diplomatic post of the Holy See

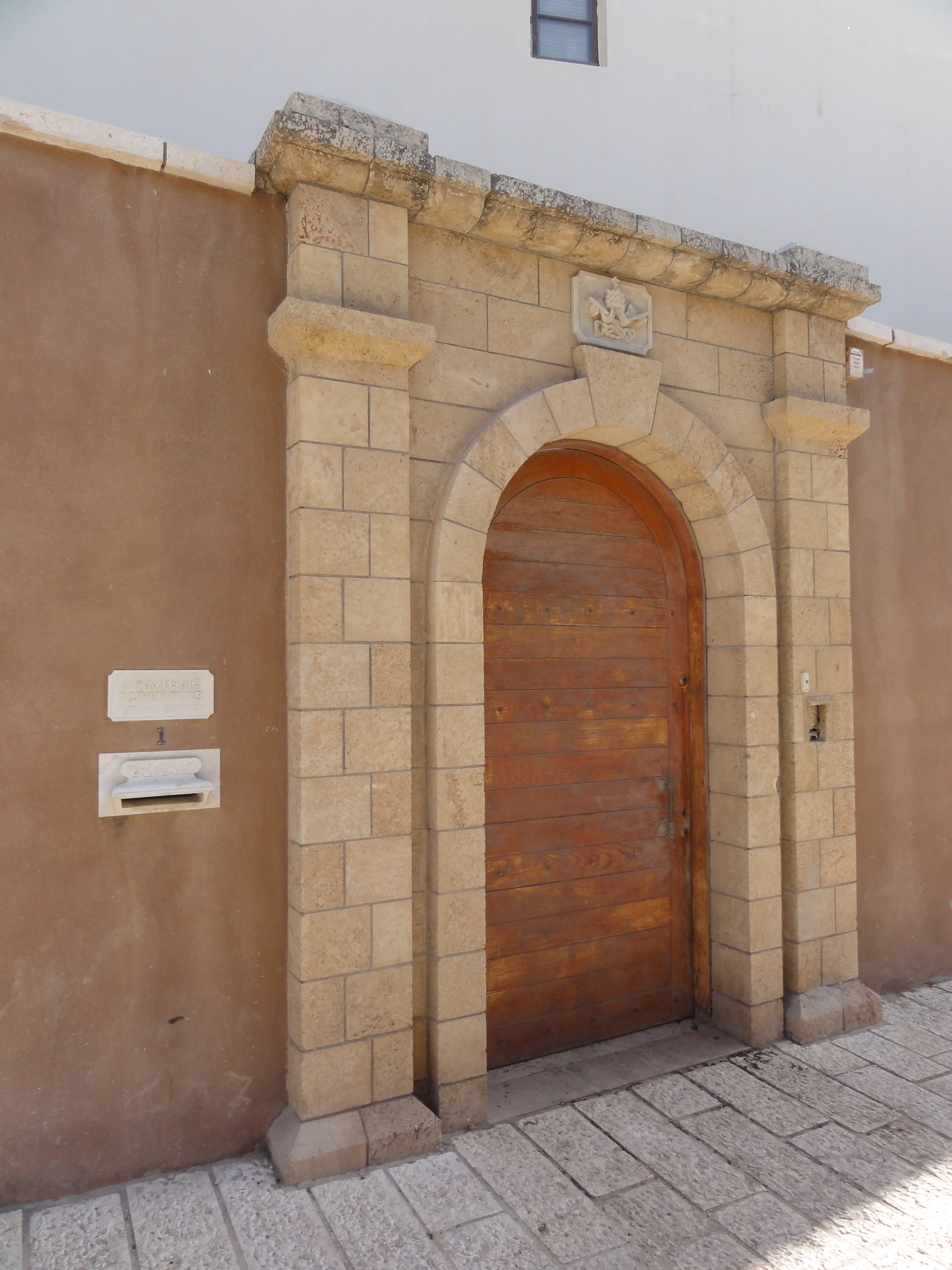
- Entrance to the Apostolic Nunciature in the Old City of Jaffa, Tel-Aviv
- Location: Tel-Aviv
- Apostolic Nuncio: Archbishop Giorgio Lingua

The Apostolic Nunciature to Israel is the nunciature (equivalent to an embassy) of the Holy See to Israel. The head of the nunciature is the Apostolic Nuncio to Israel, who is the holder of a diplomatic position within the Holy See and acts as nuncio (ambassador) of the Holy See to Israel. The office's work takes place in the broader backdrop of Holy See–Israel relations that have evolved considerably since 1994.

The nuncios to Israel has held simultaneous appointment as the Apostolic Delegate to Jerusalem and Palestine. The nunciature is located in Tel Aviv.

== History ==
In 1948, the Holy See created the office of Apostolic Delegate to Jerusalem and Palestine with responsibilities in Palestine, Transjordania, and Cyprus. In 1973 the Nunciature of Cyprus was erected.

Diplomatic relations between the Holy See and State of Israel were established in 1994 following the signing of the Fundamental Agreement between the Holy See and the State of Israel on 30 December 1993. Archbishop Andrea Cordero Lanza di Montezemolo, who had been Apostolic Delegate to Jerusalem and Palestine since 1990, was appointed the first Apostolic Nuncio to Israel.

== List of representatives ==
Apostolic Delegates to Jerusalem and Palestine

- Gustavo Testa (11 February 1948 – 6 March 1953)
- Silvio Angelo Pio Oddi (30 July 1953 – 11 January 1957)
- Giuseppe Maria Sensi (12 January 1957 – 10 May 1962)
- Lino Zanini (30 May 1962 – 4 January 1966)
- Augustin-Joseph Sépinski, O.F.M. (2 October 1965 – 5 May 1969)
- Pio Laghi (24 May 1969 – 28 May 1973)
- William Aquin Carew (10 May 1974 – 30 August 1983)
- Carlo Curis (4 February 1984 – 28 March 1990)
- Andrea Cordero Lanza di Montezemolo (28 April 1990 – 19 January 1994)

Nuncios to Israel

Since 1994, the Nuncio to Israel has also simultaneously held the titles Nuncio to Cyprus and Apostolic Delegate to Jerusalem and Palestine.

- Andrea Cordero Lanza di Montezemolo (19 January 1994 – 7 March 1998)
- Pietro Sambi (6 June 1998 – 17 December 2005)
- Antonio Franco (21 January 2006 – 18 August 2012)
- Giuseppe Lazzarotto (18 August 2012 – 28 August 2017)
- Leopoldo Girelli (13 September 2017 – 13 March 2021)
- Adolfo Tito Yllana (3 June 2021 – 22 January 2026)
- Giorgio Lingua (22 January 2026 – present)

== See also ==
- Holy See–Israel relations
- Foreign relations of Israel
- Jewish-Christian relations
