= William Aquin Carew =

Canadian Roman Catholic archbishop

- Titular Bishop of Telde
- Church: Roman Catholic Church
- See: Titular See of Telde
- In office: 1969–2012
- Predecessor: none

Orders
- Ordination: June 15, 1947
- Consecration: January 4, 1970 by Ildebrando Antoniutti

Personal details
- Born: October 23, 1922 St. John's, Newfoundland, Canada
- Died: May 8, 2012 (aged 89) St. John's, Newfoundland, Canada

William Aquin Carew (October 23, 1922 – May 8, 2012) was a Canadian prelate of the Catholic Church who worked in the diplomatic service of the Holy See from 1953 to 1997.

== Biography ==
Carew was born in St. John's, Newfoundland on October 23, 1922. He attended St. Bonaventure's College from 1937 to 1940 and then St. Paul's Seminary at the University of Ottawa. He ordained a priest on June 15, 1947. He earned a doctorate in canon law from St. Paul's in 1950, choosing as his dissertation topic "The Apostolic Delegate".

From 1947 to 1950, he was secretary to the Apostolic Nuncio to Canada, Archbishop Ildebrando Antoniutti.

He attended the Pontifical Ecclesiastical Academy from 1950 to 1952 and then worked in Rome at the Secretariat of State from 1953 to 1969, where from 1963 to 1969 he headed the English-language section. During Pope Paul's visit to the Holy Land in 1964, Carew served as interpreter between the Pope and Orthodox Patriarch Athenagoras I.

Carew was appointed titular bishop of the Telde as well as Apostolic Nuncio of Burundi and Rwanda on November 27, 1969, and consecrated a bishop on January 6, 1970.

Pope Paul VI sent him to Bangladesh in 1972 with the title of extraordinary envoy.

He was appointed Apostolic Pro-Nuncio to Cyprus and Apostolic Delegate to Jerusalem and Palestine on May 13, 1974. He also held the title Apostolic Visitor to Greece.

Carew was appointed Apostolic Pro-Nuncio to Japan on August 30, 1983, and he retired from that post on November 11, 1997, upon the appointment of his successor.

He died in St. John's on May 8, 2012.
