= Mordechay Lewy =

Israeli diplomat

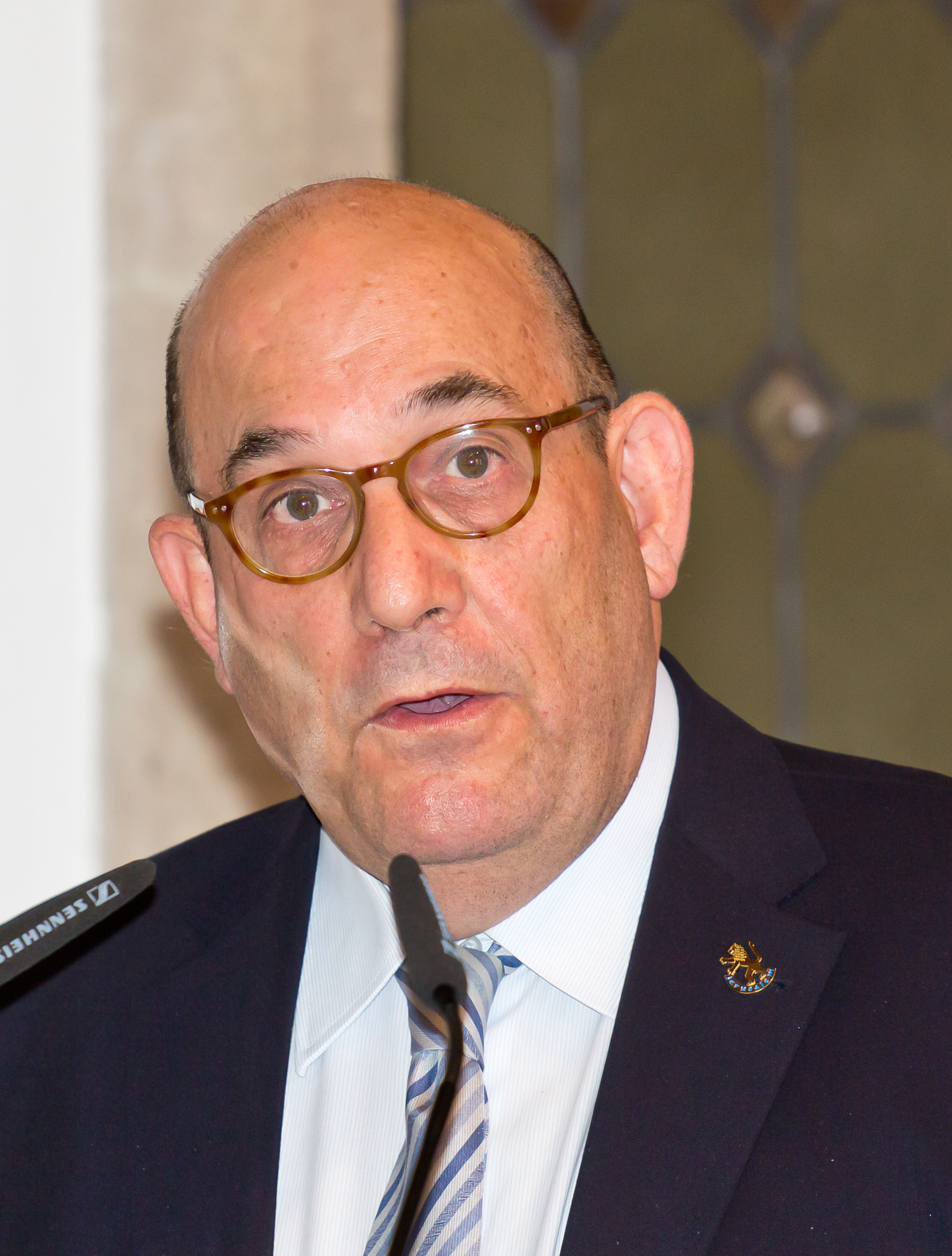
Mordechay Lewy, 2013

Mordechay Lewy (born 15 May 1948) is an Israeli diplomat who served as Israel's Ambassador to the Holy See between 12 May 2008 and 31 July 2012. Twice married and the father of three, Lewy joined the Israeli Ministry of Foreign Affairs in 1975. His nomination as Ambassador to the Holy See in May 2008 followed postings to Bonn, Stockholm and Berlin, where he served as the first Consul General after the Unification from 1991 to 1994. In 2000 he returned there as the embassy DCM. His first ambassadorial assignment was to Bangkok and Phnom Penh during the years 1994 to 1997. Lewy also served as the Jerusalem Municipality Mayor's Special Advisor for Religious Communities (i.e. Muslim and Christian communities) in a 4-year assignment between 2004 and 2008.

Lewy is a published scholar on Jewish-Catholic/Israeli-Vatican relations and in history of pilgrimages to the Holy Land. He has a special interest in turning the taboos into a subject of historical research. He initiated an international colloquium "Into the skin" on 5–6 December 2011, dedicated to this topic at the campus of the Urbaniana University affiliated to the Vatican. His interest in medieval history and the history of Jerusalem began during his studies at the Hebrew University in Jerusalem. After the end of his tenure to the Holy See, he applied for early retirement in order to pursue Doctoral research in the field of Medieval Cartography.

== Awards ==
- 2020 Sächsische Verfassungsmedaille

== Publications ==
- Gerusalemme in Acquapendente – Tutto lascia pensare che l'opera sia riconducibile al conte Ugo di Toscana
- Why Shoah and not Holocaust – on Memory and Justified Paranoia
- "An unknown view of Mt. Zion monastery by the Flemish old master Pieter Coecke van Aelst (1502–1550) as evidence to his pilgrimage to Jerusalem" in Liber Annuus Volume 55, 2005
- "From Denial to Acceptance: Holy See – Israel Relations" in Studies in Christian-Jewish Relations IV-1, Boston University 2009
- "Two letters from Michael Eneman's journey to the Holy Land", Cathedra, 53(1989),74–85 (Hebr.).
- "From Bender to Jerusalem: Carolinian expeditions as a new source for the history and geography of the Land of Israel at the beginning of the 18th century", Karolinska Förbundets Arsbok, Lund 1991, 18–42.
- "Cornelius Loos' map and his expeditions to Palestine", Cathedra, 66(1992), 74–86 (Hebr.).
- Von Halle nach Jerusalem: Halle – ein Zentrum der Palästinakunde im 18. und 19. Jahrhundert.(Edited with H.Budde), Halle 1994.
- "Towards a history of Jerusalem tattoo marks among Western pilgrims", Cathedra, 95 (2000), 37–66, (in Hebrew).
- "To Jerusalem and back", R. Sivan ed, Body lines, Tower of David- Museum of the History of Jerusalem, Jerusalem 2002, 48–57.
- "Orient und Okzident: Schuldzuweisung gegen Schuldbekenntnis", in I.A. Diekmann, Th.Gerber, J. H.Schoeps, (Hrgr.), Der Orient im Okzident – Sichtweisen und Beeinflussungen, Potsdam 2003, 21- 39.
- "Nimm meine Schuld auf mich", ZEIT, Nr. 4, 2003.
- Abdruck von Nr.7 in M.Thumann,(Hrg.), Der Islam und der Westen, Berlin 2003, 87 – 96.
- "Die Bedeutung Jerusalems- Stellenwert und Wahrnehmung in den drei Weltreligionen", Tribüne, 42/168 (2003), 120- 128.
- "Jerusalem unter der Haut- Zur Geschichte der Jerusalemer Pilgertätowierung", Zeitschrift für Religions- und Geitesgeschichte, 55(2003), 1–39.
- "Das Jerusalemkreuz – ein enigmatisches Zeichen?", Deus lo vult- Jahrbuch 2004, Deutsche Statthalterei des Ritterordens vom Heiligen Grab zu Jerusalem, 26–36.
- "Elephantendiplomatie", Milu-Mitteilungen aus dem Tierpark Berlin- Friedrichsfelde, 11/3 (2004), 262- 269.
- "An unknown view of Mt. Zion monastery by the Flemish old master Pieter Coecke van Aelst (1502- 1550), as evidence to his pilgrimage to Jerusalem", Liber Annuus, 55 (2005), 315–326; Pls. 1–10.
- "Meilensteine – Vom Rettungsring zur Lebensversicherung", TRIBÜNE, 44, Nr.173 (2005), 62-
- " 'Denn wer einmal uns versteht, wird uns auch verzeihen' – Kritik der Selbstverneinung im Zeitalter der postmodernen Unvernunft des Abendlandes", in K.Faber, J.H. Schoeps, S. Stawski (Hrgr.), Neu-alter Judenhass: Antisemitismus, arabisch- israelischer Konfikt und europäische Politik, Berlin 2006, 239- 244.
- "Western Self-Denial in the Age of Post- Modern Ignorance", The Jerusalem Review, Vol.1 (1), 2006, 102- 107. [Changed name from Nr. 2 to The Israel Journal of Foreign Affairs].
- "With Artist's Paintbrush and Pilgrim's Staff: the contribution of early sixteenth-century artists from the Lowlands to a realistic image of Jerusalem", Cathedra, 121(2006), 79–100 (in Hebrew).
- "Mount Zion as seen by Pilgrim Painters towards the end of the Mamluk period", New Studies in the Archaeology of Jerusalem and its Region, Joseph Petrich and David Amit, eds. Jerusalem 2007, 108 – 115 (Hebr.).
- "An unknown view of Mt. Zion monastery by the Flemish old master Pieter Coecke van Aelst (1502- 1550), as evidence to his pilgrimage to Jerusalem", Jahrbuch der Staatlichen Kunstsammlungen in Baden-Württemberg, 44 (2007), 61–74.
- "Cinque ferite nel simbolo della Cita Santa", L' Osservatore Romano, 28.8. 2009, 4–5.
- "Perque Shoah e non Olocausto – Memoria e definizione dello sterminio degli ebrei", L'Osservatore Romano, 21. 10. 2009.
- "I rischi dell'autosufficienza – Perché per molti ebrei ortodossi il dialogo con i cattolici è ancora difficile", L' Osservatore Romano, 13 January 2010,
- "Corporeita nel pensiero e nell'arte dell'ebraismo", Gesu – il corpo, il Volto nell'arte,(a cura di Timothy Verdon), SilvanaEditoriale, Milano 2010, 77- 83.
- "Das Schweigen des Papstes", FAZ, 26 March 2010, p. 9.
- "Tatuaggi sulla carne e nell'anima – La corporeita nel pensiero e nell'arte dell'ebraismo", L'Osservatore Romano, 22 May 2010, 4–5.
- Un rapporto difficile con la nostra fisicita – Un confronto con la spritualita cristiana e il dualismo greco", pagine ebraiche, no.6 (giugno 2010), pp. 28–29.
- Da Abramo di Ur ad Abraham Geiger", L'Osservatore Romano, 19.8. 2010,
- Pope Benedict XVI within the context of Israel and the Holy See relations", Israel Affairs, Vol. 16, No.4, October 2010, pp. 562–578.
- "Body in 'Finis Terrae', head in 'Terra Sancta'. The veneration of the head of the Apostle James in Compostela and Jerusalem: Western, Crusader and Armenian traditions", Hagiographica XVII (2010), pp. 131 – 174.
- "La croce di Gerusalemme- un simbolo enigmatico? Un tentativo di ricostruirne la genesi e d'interpreterla," Sallentina Tellus, 6(2010), pp. 51–61.
- Corporeality in Jewish Thought and Art, PaRDeS. Zeitschrift der Vereinigung für Jüdische Studien, 17 (2011), 209–223.
- Der apokalyptische Abessinier und die Kreuzzüge. Wandel eines frühislamischen Motivs in der Literatur und Kartografie des Mittelalters (= Beiträge zur Erforschung des Alten Testaments und des antiken Judentums, 61). Peter Lang, Berlin 2018, ISBN 978-3-631-74977-7
- "The French King and the Ostrich: Reflections on the Date of the Medieval Vercelli Map of the World", Imago Mundi 73 (2021), Part 1, 64–72.

== See also ==
- Holy See–Israel relations
