= Shmuel Hadas =

Israeli diplomat (1931–2010)

Shmuel Hadas (Hebrew: שמואל הדס; 1931 – January 12, 2010) was an Israeli diplomat. He was born to a Zionist Jewish family in Argentina. In 1953, he emigrated to Israel. In 1964 joined the Israeli Ministry of Foreign Affairs and was Ambassador to Bolivia from 1971 until 1975. In January 1986, he became the first Israeli ambassador to Spain, and in 1994 the first Israeli ambassador to the Holy See, a position he held until 1997.

In 1997, he retired from diplomatic work and was engaged in academic and cultural work.

== See also ==
- Israel–Spain relations
