= Auspicia quaedam =

1948 papal encyclical by Pius XII

Auspicia quaedam Encyclical of Pope Pius XII
- Signature date: 1 May 1948
- Number: 14 of the pontificate

Auspicia quaedam (1 May 1948) is an encyclical of Pope Pius XII on worldwide public prayers to the Virgin Mary for World peace and the solution to the conflict in Palestine.

== Background ==
The war in Palestine affected the holy places and therefore the encyclical hopes for a settlement of the situation through a just peace and mutual concord. To support this requests, the Pope asks for a holy prayer crusade to the Most Blessed Virgin. He asks for a consecration to be made in the various dioceses as well as in each of the parishes and families.

Although a terrible war has ended, peace has not arrived in the minds and hearts of all men. The post-war period is full of dangers for the family of nations, dangers of threatening disasters. Because human means are unequal to the task, the Pontiff appeals in prayer first of all to God; he exhorts all throughout the world, to implore, together, in ardent prayer the Divine assistance.

He thanks the Virgin Mother of God for having obtained, through her powerful intercession, the long desired termination of World War Two. At the same time, He implores her for the gift of peace, of fraternal and complete peace among all nations and for harmony among all social classes.

The encyclical argues, that prayer to the Blessed Virgin must be more than words, they must be based on virtues, reform and a revival of Christian conduct. For only from Christian virtues one can hope to see the course of history take its proper, orderly direction.

The Pontiff is concerned about the Holy Places of Palestine, which have long been disturbed.

=== Consecration to the Immaculate Heart of Mary ===
He desires, that supplications be poured forth to the Most Holy Virgin for this request: that the situation in Palestine may at long last be settled justly and thereby concord and peace be also happily established. He places great confidence in her powerful patronage and asks for the month of May 1948 for a crusade of prayers especially of children to the Heavenly Mother. For a just solution of disputes, and a firm and free peace for the Church and for all nations Pope Pius XII dedicates the human family to the immaculate heart of Mary and asks local dedication to be made as well.
