= Laetamur admodum =

1956 encyclical of Pope Pius XII

Laetamur admodum Latin for 'Much to our delight' Encyclical of Pope Pius XII
- Signature date: 1 November 1956
- Number: 34 of 41 of the pontificate
- Text: In Latin; In English

Laetamur admodum issued November 1, 1956, is an encyclical of Pope Pius XII renewing his request for prayers for peace for Poland, Hungary, and the Middle East.

The Holy Father is most pleased to learn that the Catholic World responded with generosity and enthusiasm to his request for public prayers. And so seems that maybe a new dawn of peace based on justice seems to be breaking at long last for the people of Poland and Hungary. He was happy to learn, that Cardinals Stefan Wyszynski and Joseph Mindszenty, Archbishop of Esztergom, who had both been expelled from their Sees, have been restored to their positions, and were warmly welcomed by their faithful. He asks all the Catholics of those countries to unite themselves with their shepherds. True peace has not materialized yet. And war continues in the Middle East.

May all men, especially those who hold the destinies of nations in their hands, remember that war brings no lasting benefit, but a host of misfortunes and disasters. Differences among men are not resolved by arms, bloodshed, or destruction, but only by reason, law, prudence, and justice.

— Laetamur admodum, 8
