= Pietro Sambi =

Italian prelate

His Excellency Pietro Sambi
- Apostolic Nuncio; Titular Archbishop of Bellicastrum
- Appointed: 10 October 1985
- Previous posts: Apostolic Nuncio to the United States (2006–2011); Apostolic Delegate to Jerusalem and Palestine; Nuncio to Israel and Cyprus (1998–2005); Apostolic Pro-Nuncio to Indonesia (1991–1998); Apostolic Pro-Nuncio to Burundi (1985–1991)

Orders
- Ordination: 14 March 1964
- Consecration: 9 November 1985 by Jozef Tomko

Personal details
- Born: 27 June 1938 Sogliano al Rubicone, Italy
- Died: 27 July 2011 (aged 73) Johns Hopkins Hospital, Baltimore, United States
- Coat of arms

Styles of Pietro Sambi
- Reference style: The Most Reverend
- Spoken style: His Excellency
- Religious style: Archbishop

Pietro Sambi (27 June 1938 – 27 July 2011) was an Italian prelate of the Catholic Church who served in the diplomatic service of the Holy See from 1969 until his death in 2011. He had the rank of archbishop and the title of nuncio from 1985, fulfilling assignments in Burundi, Indonesia, Cyprus, Israel, Jerusalem and Palestine, and the United States.

== Biography ==
Sambi was born in Sogliano al Rubicone (Forlì-Cesena), Italy, on 27 June 1938. He spoke Italian, English, French and Spanish.

He was ordained to the priesthood for the Diocese of San Marino-Montefeltro on 14 March 1964 and earned degrees in theology and canon law. At the Diocesan Seminary in Pennabilli he was responsible for priestly formation and then became Vice Rector.

He entered the diplomatic service of the Holy See in 1969, serving first at the nunciature in Cameroon. He moved to the Apostolic Nunciature in Jerusalem on 19 July 1971, and then to the Apostolic Nunciatures in Cuba in 1974, Algeria in 1978, Nicaragua in 1979, Belgium in 1981, and India in May 1984 with the rank of counselor. In Nicaragua, he was named charge d'affaires just after the leftist Sandinistas under Daniel Ortega came to power and mediated between the Catholic bishops who opposed priests' participation in the government and priests who held prominent government offices in the socialist government.

On 10 October 1985, Pope John Paul II named him pro-nuncio to Burundi and titular archbishop of Bellicastrum. In 1991 he was made pro-nuncio to Indonesia. On 6 June 1998 he was named to several positions concurrently: Nuncio to Israel and to Cyprus and Apostolic Delegate in Jerusalem and Palestine. In 2002, faced with problems constructing a statue in front of the Basilica of the Annunciation in Nazareth, he was assisted by Cardinal Theodore McCarrick, Archbishop of Washington, and they became friends. When the Basilica of the Nativity in Bethlehem became the center of a stalemate between Palestinian Israeli forces, he negotiated a peaceful resolution. He also criticized Israel's construction of a wall to separate the Palestinian territories from Israel. In March 2003 he warned that Palestinian plans for self-government made no allowance for the practice of religions other than Islam. He also criticized the anti-Semitism found in Palestinian schoolbooks and successfully campaigned for Italy to discontinue support for educational initiatives that used such works. He campaigned for a special status for Jerusalem that would allow it to serve as the center of several major religions. In 2005, he complained that Israel was failing to implement agreements reached with the Holy See over church properties and the treatment of Catholic Arabs in Jerusalem more than a decade earlier.

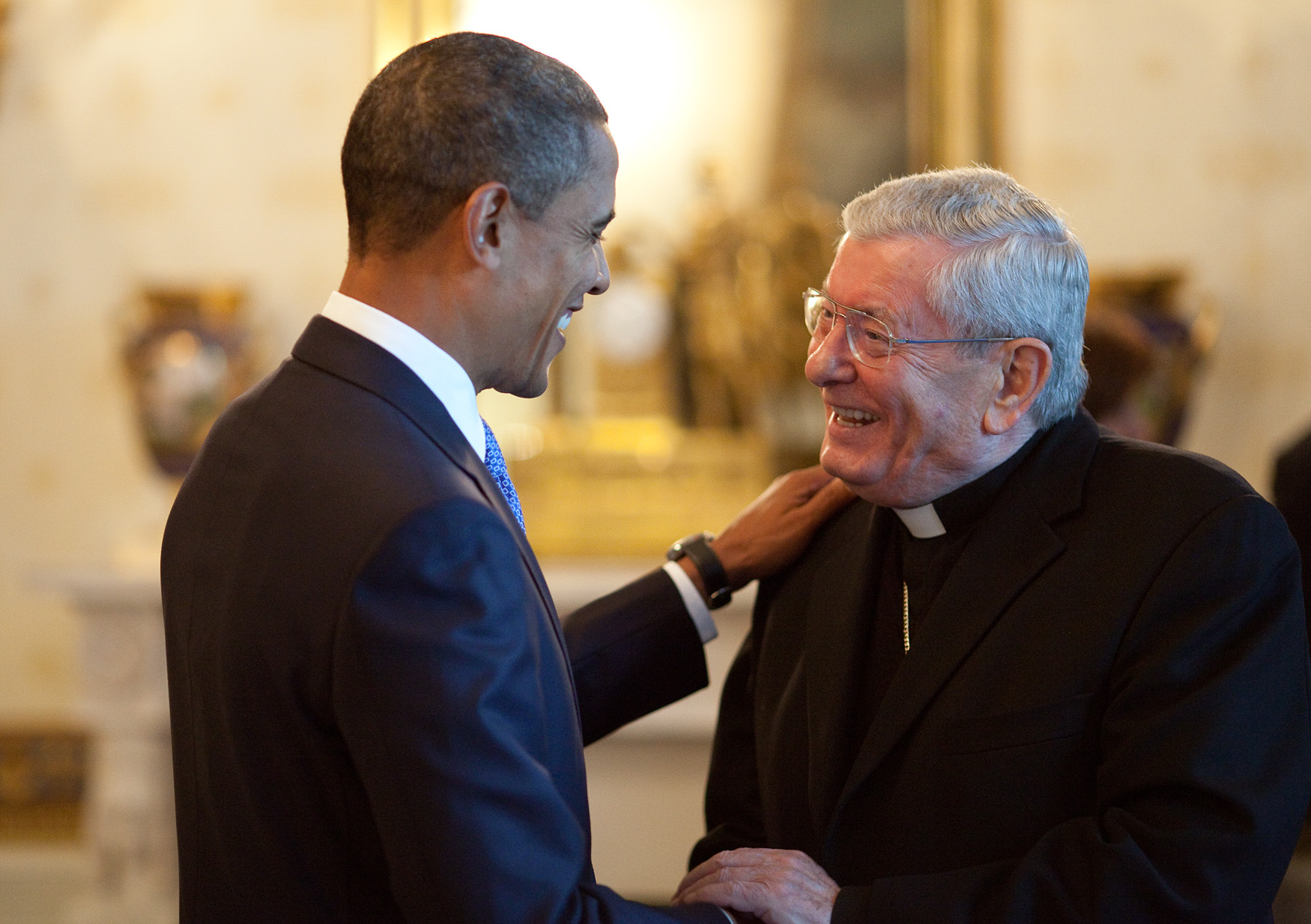
Sambi with U.S. President Barack Obama

Pope Benedict XVI named Sambi the Apostolic Nuncio to the United States and Permanent Observer of the Holy See to the Organization of American States on 17 December 2005. He was installed in early 2006. He toured the damage left by Hurricane Katrina during the summer of 2006, shortly after his appointment. During Pope Benedict's April 2008 visit to the U.S., Sambi accompanied the Pope and hosted him at the apostolic nunciature, where the Pope held a historic private meeting with five victims of clergy sexual abuse.

As nuncio, beginning in 2007, he was tasked with and had little success in enforcing restrictions that Pope Benedict XVI placed on Cardinal Theodore McCarrick because of reports of inappropriate sexual behavior.

Sambi received an honorary doctorate from Regis University in Denver, Colorado, on 8 May 2011. He was the 2009 Living Stones Solidarity Award of the Holy Land Christian Ecumenical Foundation for his work in the Middle East.

On 22 July 2011, Sambi underwent lung surgery and developed complications that required the use of assisted ventilation. On 27 July, he died at Johns Hopkins Hospital in Baltimore, apparently from complications relating to that surgery.

Diplomatic posts
Preceded by Bernard Henri René Jacqueline	Apostolic Nuncio to Burundi; 10 October 1985 – 28 November 1991	Succeeded by Rino Passigato
Preceded by Francesco Canalini	Apostolic Nuncio to Indonesia; 28 November 1991 – 6 June 1998	Succeeded by Renzo Fratini
Preceded by Andrea Cordero Lanza di Montezemolo	Apostolic Nuncio to Israel; 6 June 1998 – 17 December 2005	Succeeded by Antonio Franco
Preceded by Gabriel Montalvo Higuera	Apostolic Nuncio to the United States; 17 December 2005 – 27 July 2011	Succeeded by Carlo Maria Viganò
