= Fundamental Agreement Between the Holy See and the State of Israel =

1993 treaty about the Catholic Church's property rights and tax exemptions within Israel

The Fundamental Agreement between the Holy See and the State of Israel or "Fundamental Agreement" is a treaty or concordat between the Holy See and the State of Israel, signed on 30 December 1993. The Agreement deals with the property rights and tax exemptions of the Catholic Church within Israeli territory. It did not resolve all issues, and the parties continue to meet in an attempt to resolve the issues outstanding.

The Fundamental Agreement is supplemented by an Additional Protocol signed on the same date, that details provisions related to the establishment of normal diplomatic ties between the Holy See and Israel.

The Agreement and its Additional Protocol were ratified by the State of Israel on 20 February 1994, and on the same date the Holy See was notified of such ratification. The Holy See, for its part, ratified the Agreement and its Protocol on 7 March 1994, and the State of Israel was notified of such ratification on 10 March 1994. Also on that date, upon the completion of the exchange of diplomatic notices regarding the ratification of the treaty, it entered into force in international law. However, the Israeli Knesset has not passed legislation to ratify the treaty in Israel's domestic law.

As a result of the Agreement, diplomatic relations between the Holy See and Israel were established in 1994, with the Vatican appointing an apostolic nuncio to Israel and Israel appointing an ambassador to the Vatican. Zion Evrony was the Israeli ambassador to the Vatican from 30 September 2012 to 2016. He was followed by Oren David.

== Diplomatic relations ==
Diplomatic relations between the Holy See and Israel were established on 19 January 1994. A number of issues between the two states are still outstanding and the subject of negotiation.

== Legal Personality Agreement ==
On 10 November 1997, the Vatican and Israel entered into a “Legal Personality Agreement” (also referred to as the "Agreement on the Legal Personality of the Church") pursuant to Article 3 (3) of the Fundamental Agreement which provides:

Concerning Catholic legal personality at canon law the Holy See and the State of Israel will negotiate on giving it full effect in Israeli law, following a report from a joint subcommission of experts.

Under the provision, Israel agreed ”to assure full effect in Israeli law to the legal personality of the Catholic Church” and all Catholic institutions operating in Israel. The agreement recognises the corporate status in law, instead of the previous de facto status, on the Catholic entities formed under Catholic canon law, without having to incorporate under Israeli law.

The entities covered by the Agreement are:

- Catholic Church itself;
- Eastern Catholic Patriarchates: Melkite Greek Catholic Church, Syrian Catholic, Maronite, Chaldean, Armenian Catholic;
- Latin Patriarchate of Jerusalem, id est the Latin Patriarchal Diocese of Jerusalem;
- present Dioceses of the Eastern Catholic Patriarchates;
- new Dioceses, wholly in Israel, Eastern Catholic or Latin, as may exist from time to time;
- "Assembly of the Catholic Ordinaries of the Holy Land";
- Custody of the Holy Land;
- Pontifical Institutes of Consecrated Life of the kinds that exist in the Catholic Church, and such of their Provinces or Houses as the Institute concerned may cause to be certified;
- other official entities of the Catholic Church.

The Agreement has still not been ratified by the Knesset.

== Outstanding issues ==
=== Church taxes ===
Taxes by Israel on church properties and income in Israel remains an issue for the Vatican.

=== Visas for church personnel ===
The change in rules by Israel relating to the previously easy grant of visas to Church personnel is an issue for the Vatican.

=== Church property ===
The status of church properties and communities under Israeli domestic law remains unresolved. When the region was part of the Ottoman Empire and, later, under the British Mandatory Administration, church properties enjoyed a special legal and tax status. Their status became unclear with the creation of the state of Israel. The church property remains an issue for the Vatican, as the Catholic Church has extensive property holdings in Israel.

In a paper on the first five years of the accord, Rabbi David Rosen, director of the American Jewish Committee's Department for Interreligious Affairs, stated that normalizing the legal standing of church personnel and institutions is a complex matter. Rosen wrote:

The Holy See would have liked to have been considered as an extra territorial entity, enjoying the same privileges granted to foreign delegations and their properties. There was no way that Israel was going to grant such status, especially not for a community overwhelmingly made up of Israeli citizens. Moreover, aside from the principle, to have done so for the Catholic community without doing so for other Christian denominations would have posed substantial difficulties for Israel.

== Israel–Vatican Working Commission ==
The Israel-Vatican Working Commission was convened in Jerusalem on 30 April 2009 to try to resolve economic issues with the then forthcoming visit of Benedict XVI to the Middle East in mind. The Commission could not reach an agreement and met again in the Vatican on 10 December 2009.

A further meeting was held on 20 May 2010; reportedly, the possibility of a comprehensive Israeli-Vatican agreement was discussed. After another meeting, held on 21 September 2010, more progress was reported.

The next meeting took place on 6 December 2010, and yet another on 14 June 2011. A further meeting was scheduled for 1 December 2011 but was convened, in Israel, only on 26 January 2012. Some progress was reported at a meeting held on 12 June 2012. The Working Commission met on 29 January 2013, but no specific progress was reported. Another meeting was held on 5 June 2013, but no progress was reported. Another meeting was held on 11 February 2014 in Jerusalem, and the next meeting was scheduled for June 2014. However, the scheduled meeting of the commission was not held, probably owing to tensions over the peace process. A further meeting took place in Jerusalem on 18 January 2017 and another meeting took place in the Vatican on 13 June 2017. The negotiations had not concluded as at 14 June 2019.

== See also ==
- Holy See–Israel relations
