= European Union reactions to the Gaza war =

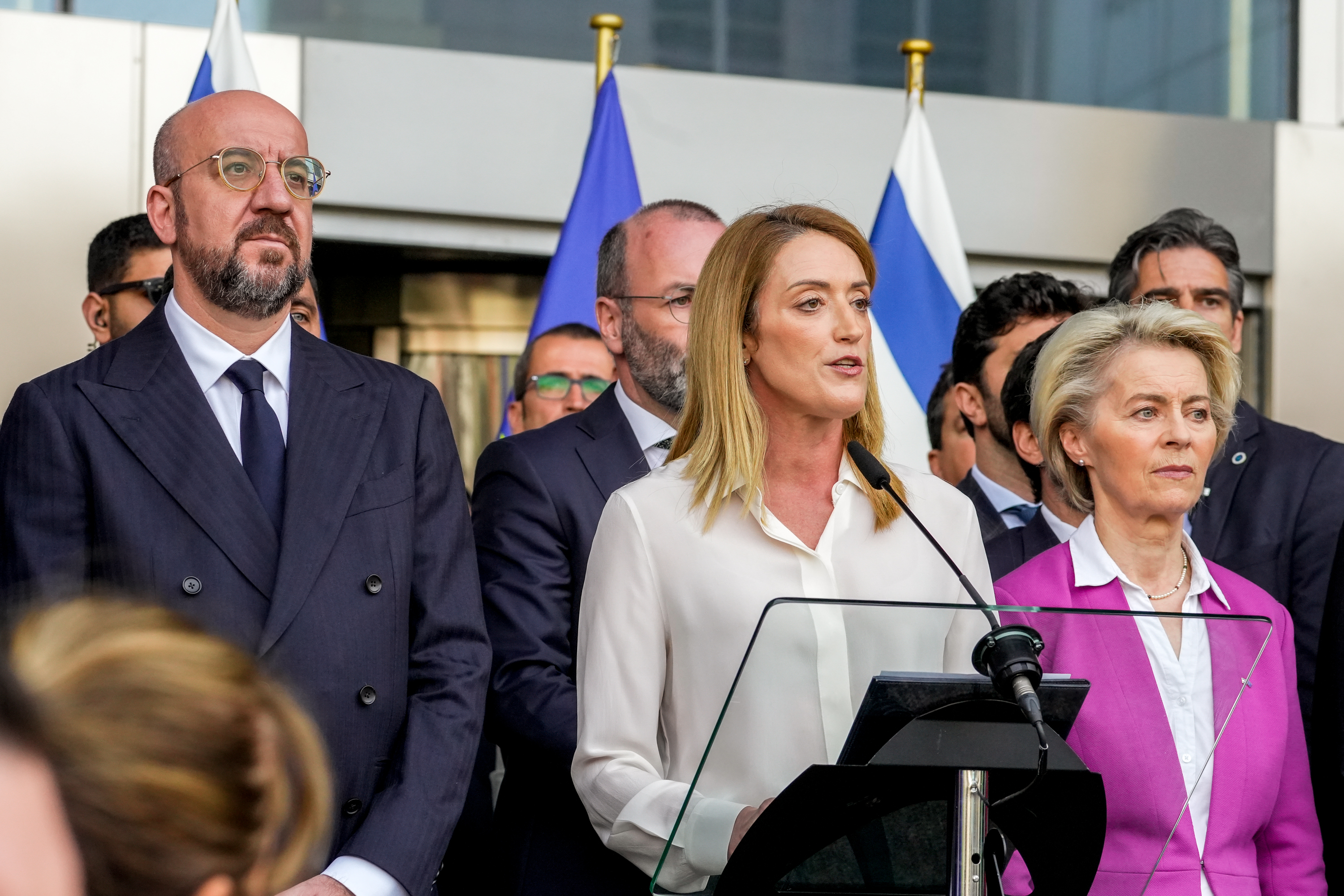
Gathering in support to Israel in front of the European Parliament in Brussels in presence of Roberta Metsola (President of the European Parliament), Ursula von der Leyen (President of the European Commission), Charles Michel (President of the European Council) and Members of the Parliament on 11 October 2023.

The Gaza war has had significant effects on some major European Union member countries and institutions, disrupting EU–Israel relations and EU–Palestine relations. Despite unanimous condemnation of the October 7 attacks, Israel's actions in Gaza since then have been increasingly criticised by EU members, with Ireland, Slovenia, and Spain being the most vocal of these countries. Conversely, member states such Germany and Hungary has continued to maintain close ties to Israel.

== Background ==
The Gaza war (Note: Also referred to as the "Israel–Hamas war", "war on Gaza", "Operation Iron Swords" (Hebrew: מִלְחֲמֹת חַרְבוֹת בַּרְזֶל), the "battle of al-Aqsa Flood" (Arabic: معركة طوفان الأقصى), "October 7 war", and others. For more information, see Names.) is an armed conflict in the Gaza Strip and Israel, fought as part of the unresolved Israeli–Palestinian and Gaza–Israel conflicts. The war began on 7 October 2023, when Palestinian militant group Hamas led an attack on Israel, in which 1,195 Israelis and foreign nationals were killed and 251 were taken hostage. Since the start of the Israeli offensive that followed, over 74,000 Palestinians in Gaza have been killed; several studies in The Lancet indicate this figure is likely a significant undercount. Many scholarly sources and international organizations—including UN bodies, NGOs, and the International Association of Genocide Scholars—have concluded that Israel's actions in Gaza constitute genocide under international law. (Note: Attributed to multiple references:) Several countries have also stated that genocide is occurring and have supported legal proceedings before the International Court of Justice. Israel and its supporters have denied that genocide has occurred.

Following the 7 October attacks, Israel launched a bombing campaign and later invaded Gaza on 27 October after clearing militants from its territory. Israeli forces launched several campaigns, including the Rafah offensive, three battles fought around Khan Yunis, and the siege of North Gaza, culminating in a 2025 offensive in Gaza City. They have assassinated Hamas leaders inside and outside of Gaza. A 2023 ceasefire broke down, and a second ceasefire in January 2025 ended with a surprise attack by Israel in March. A third ceasefire came into effect on 10 October after Israel and Hamas agreed to phase one of a US-backed peace plan. As part of the peace plan, the Hamas civil administration in Gaza resigned on 6 July 2026, and an agreement was reached on 31 July for Hamas and other militant organisations in Gaza to disarm, contingent on reconstruction progress and Israel's military withdrawal.

Despite the ceasefire, hostilities have continued, with Israel carrying out airstrikes almost daily and conducting ongoing military operations in the Gaza Strip. By 20 October 2026, at least 1,400 Palestinians and 5 Israeli military personnel had been killed since the ceasefire took effect. Israel has steadily been moving their controversial Yellow Line further westwards into Gaza where its military control and access restrictions have expanded to appropriately 65% of the Gaza Strip by October 2026, up from around 53% when the ceasefire first began, confining 2.1 million residents into an increasingly narrow western zone.

The war has resulted in significant humanitarian costs. A tightened blockade by Israel cut off basic necessities, which led to a partial famine. Around 90% of Gaza's civilian infrastructure has been destroyed and essential services, including water, electricity, and sanitation, have been severely disrupted; large parts are uninhabitable, with most hospitals, religious and cultural landmarks, and educational facilities destroyed. Gazan journalists, health workers, aid workers and other members of civil society have been detained, tortured, and killed. Israel has detained thousands of Palestinians from Gaza and the West Bank since the start of the war. Nearly all of the strip's 2.3 million Palestinians have been forcibly displaced. Over 100,000 Israelis were internally displaced at the height of the conflict. The first day was the deadliest in Israel's history, and the war is the deadliest for Palestinians in the broader conflict.

In September 2025, the UN Commission of Inquiry on the Occupied Palestinian Territory concluded that four of the five acts of genocide as defined by the Genocide Convention had been committed in Gaza since 7 October 2023. A case accusing Israel of genocide is being reviewed by the International Court of Justice. Experts and human rights organizations have also stated that Israel and Hamas have committed other war crimes. Some have described the 7 October attacks as a genocide or genocidal massacre of Israelis. Torture and sexual violence have been committed both by Palestinian militant groups and by Israeli forces.

Israel has received extensive military and diplomatic support from the United States. The war has reverberated regionally, with "Axis of Resistance" groups across several Arab countries and Iran clashing with the US and Israel, including in the Twelve-Day War in 2025, and the 2026 Iran war. A year of strikes between Israel and Hezbollah led to wars in Lebanon in 2024 and in 2026, as well as ongoing Israeli operations in Syria, which contributed to the fall of the Assad regime. The war continues to have regional and international repercussions, with large protests worldwide as well as a surge of antisemitism and anti-Palestinian racism.

== Timeline ==
=== Initial reactions from EU member states ===
- European Union: President of the European Commission Ursula von der Leyen said she "unequivocally" condemned "the attack carried out by Hamas terrorists against Israel", calling it "terrorism in its most despicable form" and saying "Israel has the right to defend itself against such heinous attacks". EU ambassador to Israel Dimiter Tzantchev condemned the attack. Israeli flags were raised outside the headquarters of the European Commission and the European Parliament in Brussels, while the latter's president Roberta Metsola led a vigil in the chamber on 11 October to commemorate the Israeli victims of the attack which also featured a minute's silence and a rendition of the Israeli national anthem. The European Council issued a joint statement of 15 October, condemning "in the strongest possible terms" Hamas and its brutal and indiscriminate terrorist attacks.
- Austria: Foreign Minister Alexander Schallenberg announced the suspension of the delivery of 19 million euros ($20 million) of aid to Palestinian areas on 9 October in response to Hamas' attack and said that it would review its existing projects in Palestine. He also said that he would summon the Iranian ambassador to address Iran's "abhorrent reactions" to the attack.
- Belgium: Foreign Minister Hadja Lahbib said on X that the country strongly condemned "the massive rocket attacks against Israeli civilians" and said that their "thoughts are with all those affected".
- Bulgaria: Prime Minister Nikolai Denkov expressed his country's solidarity with the Israeli people and condemned Hamas's attack. The National Assembly building was lit up in the colors of the Israeli flag.
- Croatia: Prime Minister Andrej Plenković condemned the attacks referring to them as "terrorist acts against civilians" and expressed solidarity with Israel. Foreign Minister Gordan Grlić-Radman also condemned the attack and expressed solidarity with Israel.
- Cyprus: President Nikos Christodoulides and the Cypriot embassy in Israel condemned the attacks and stated that Cyprus stood with Israel.
- Czech Republic: Prime Minister Petr Fiala condemned the attack, stating his thoughts were "with the innocent victims of the violence" and wishing "our friends in Israel the swiftest possible handling of the situation and the fulfilment [sic] of their ambitions to live in peace and security." Fiala participated in pro-Israel demonstrations in Prague and called the country "the voice of Israel in Europe."
- Denmark: Foreign Minister Lars Løkke Rasmussen strongly condemned the attack against Israel, adding that his thoughts were "with the victims, their families and all of Israel".
- Estonia: Marko Mihkelson, the Chairman of the Foreign Affairs Committee of the Riigikogu, strongly condemned the attacks against Israel, saying he was "concerned about the expansion of terrorist activity in the region". He invited international organisations to "confront the attempts of terrorist regimes to create instability and chaos in the whole Middle East region."
- Finland: Foreign Minister Elina Valtonen condemned in the strongest terms the "terrorist rocket attacks targeting Israel".
- France: President Emmanuel Macron strongly condemned the attack and expressed his "full solidarity with the victims, their families and loved ones". The French embassy in Israel condemned the attacks and described Hamas' actions as "inadmissible terrorist attacks".
- Germany: Chancellor Olaf Scholz said he was deeply shocked by the "terrifying news" of "rocket fire from Gaza and the escalating violence". He also said that Germany condemned Hamas' attack and would stand by Israel." Germany suspended €125 million ($131 million) of development aid to Palestine in response to Hamas' attack and said it would review other projects and aid given. Scholz offered military aid to Israel, while President Frank-Walter Steinmeier called on Arabs living in Germany to distance themselves from Hamas.
- Greece: Prime Minister Kyriakos Mitsotakis strongly condemned the terrorist attack against Israel, that caused a high number of casualties among civilians. He also expressed his full support for the people of Israel and its right to self-defense. Migration minister Dimitris Keridis expressed his concerns of a resurgence in illegal immigrants to southern Europe, saying that the attack would "not ease illegal migration".
- Hungary: Prime Minister Viktor Orbán strongly condemned the attack against Israel, and stated that he unequivocally supported Israel's right to self-defence. He also expressed his "sympathy and condolences" to Prime Minister Benjamin Netanyahu, adding that "our thoughts and prayers are with the people of Israel in these dark hours".
- Ireland: Taoiseach Leo Varadkar strongly condemned Hamas' attacks against Israel, calling them "appalling" and expressed that Ireland unequivocally condemned attacks on civilians. Tánaiste, Foreign Minister and Defence Minister Micheál Martin further condemned Hamas' "unconscionable" attacks, expressing that "deliberate and systematic targeting of civilians can never be justified". They called for an immediate cessation of all hostilities. President Michael D. Higgins subsequently issued a statement condemning the attacks as "deeply reprehensible" and expressed his support for Israel's right to defend itself.
- Italy: Foreign Minister Antonio Tajani said the government condemned in the strongest terms the attacks on Israel; saying that "people's lives, the security of the region and the resumption of any political process are at risk." He also urged Hamas to "immediately stop this barbaric violence" and said that Italy supports "Israel's right to exist and defend itself". The Prime Minister's office released a statement saying that the government was "closely following the brutal attack taking place in Israel" and condemned "in the strongest terms the ongoing terror and violence against innocent civilians" It also said it supported "Israel's right to defend itself."
- Latvia: President Edgars Rinkēvičs expressed his country's "unwavering support to Israel's legitimate right to defend itself against terrorists". Foreign Minister Krišjānis Kariņš accused Hamas of using Palestinian civilians as human shields.
- Lithuania: President Gitanas Nausėda said that the country unequivocally condemned Hamas attacks against civilians in Israel and said the country fully supported "Israel in these terrible hours", and expressed "condolences to the families of the victims". He also said that "Israel has the right to defend itself." The Seimas unanimously adopted a resolution condemning Hamas' attacks.
- Luxembourg: Foreign Minister Jean Asselborn condemned Hamas's attack, and underlined the need for a renewed international commitment to a two-state solution.
- Malta called on the United Nations Security Council to hold a meeting regarding the conflict.
- Netherlands: Prime Minister Mark Rutte said he spoke with Prime Minister Netanyahu about the attack by Hamas on Israel and "told him that the Netherlands unequivocally condemns this terrorist violence and fully supports Israel's right to defend itself".
- Poland: Foreign Minister Zbigniew Rau condemned "in the strongest terms the ongoing attacks by Hamas against Israel".
- Portugal: President Marcelo Rebelo de Sousa and Prime Minister António Costa condemned Hamas's attacks as "unacceptable" and deserving of "strong condemnation".
- Romania: President Klaus Iohannis strongly condemned the attack against Israel, adding that the country stood "in full solidarity with Israel in these terrible moments."
- Slovakia: Defence Minister Martin Sklenár condemned the Hamas attacks in the "strongest terms" and supported Israel's right to self-defense.
- Slovenia: Prime Minister Robert Golob condemned the attacks against Israel.
- Spain: Prime Minister Pedro Sánchez strongly condemned what he called terrorism and demanded the immediate cessation of indiscriminate violence against the civilian population, likewise affirming Spain's standing commitment to regional stability. Deputy prime minister Yolanda Díaz called on the international community to put pressure on Israel to stop what she called a massacre in Gaza, while Minister of Social Rights Ione Belarra accused the EU and the US of "being complicit in Israel's war crimes" and called for Israel to be denounced before the International Criminal Court because of what she identified as ongoing "planned genocide" in the Gaza Strip against the Palestinian peoples. In November 2023, Sanchez criticized Israel's bombardment of the Gaza Strip and called for an "immediate ceasefire". He promised to "work in Europe and in Spain to recognise the Palestinian state".
- Sweden: Foreign Minister Tobias Billström condemned the attack against Israel, and said the government stood in solidarity with all civilians hurt by the attackers.

=== Initial reactions from European parties ===
- On the day of the attack, General Secretary of the European People's Party Antonio López-Istúriz White and Vice President of the European People's Party David McAllister issued a statement strongly condemning "the heinous attack launched against Israel by Hamas terrorists".
- On 8 November, President of the Progressive Alliance of Socialists and Democrats Iratxe García stressed the importance of putting an end to "Netanyahu's collective punishment of Gaza's people".
- On 2 December, the European Greens condemned "the horrific terrorist attacks committed by Hamas", but pointed that the civilian cost of the current conflict [in Israel and Gaza] is "unacceptable" and called on Israel to respect international law while defending themselves.

== Development ==
Numerous members of the European Union have gone to Israel for consultations.

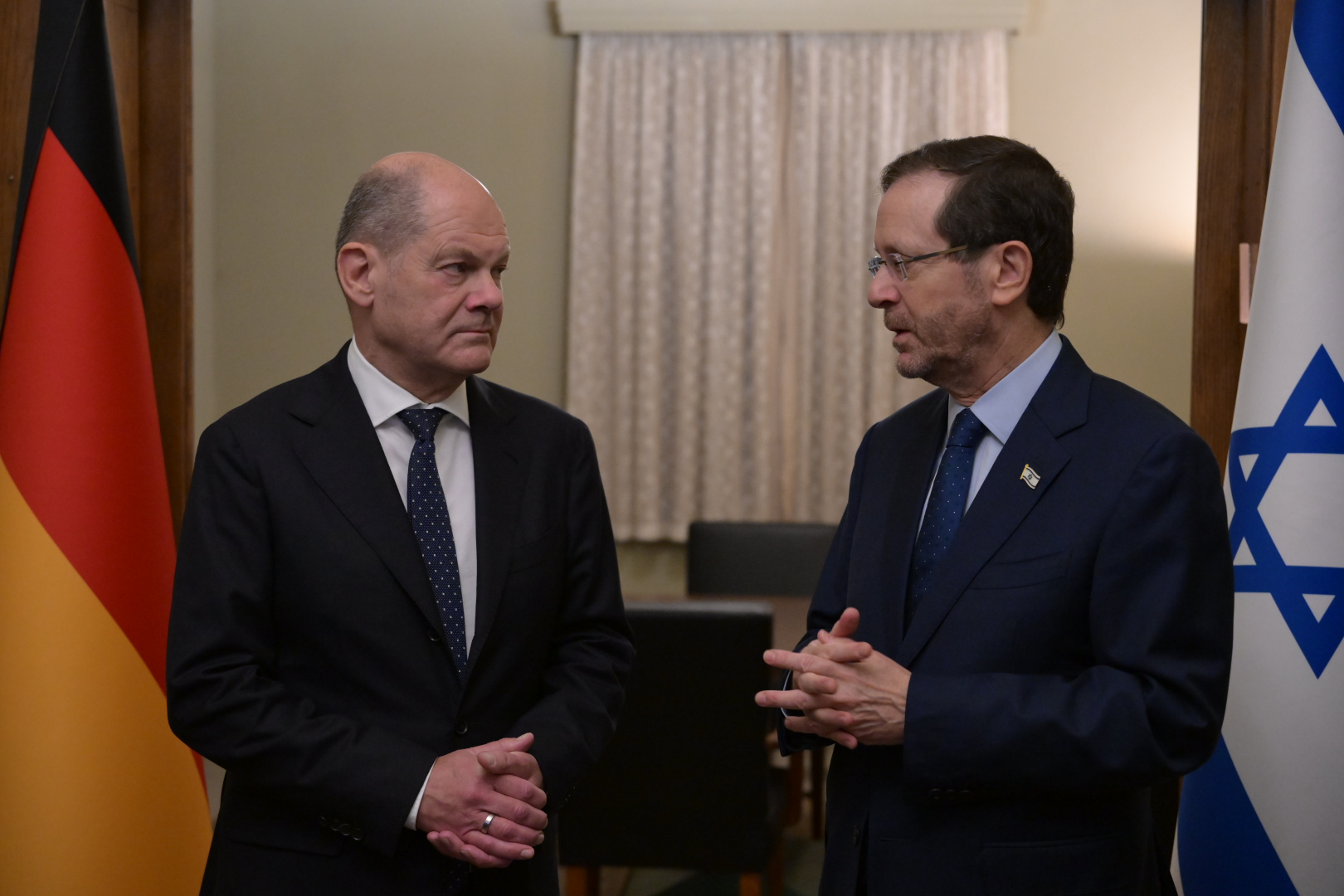
Olaf Scholz and Isaac Herzog, 17 October 2023

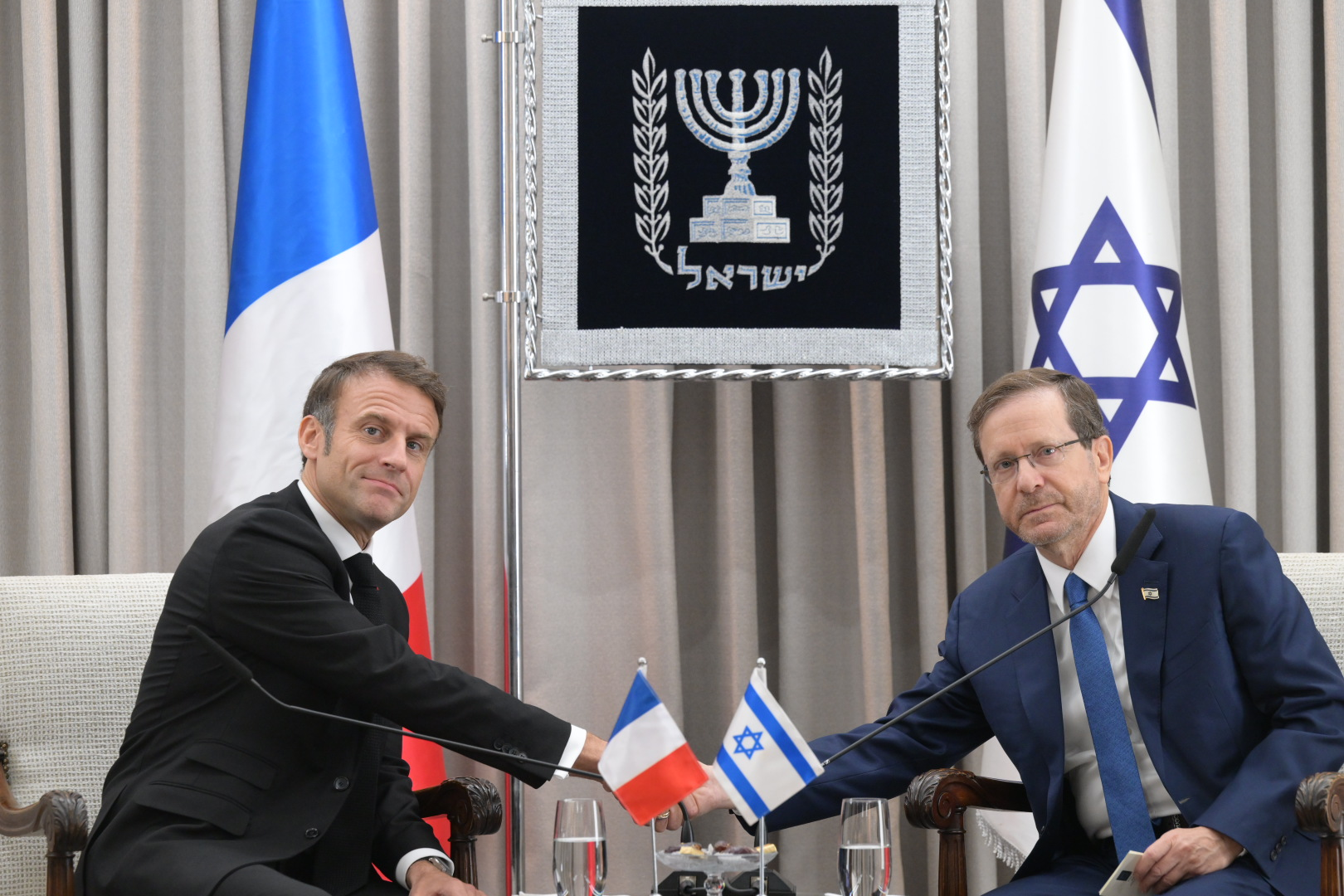
Emmanuel Macron and Isaac Herzog, 24 October 2023

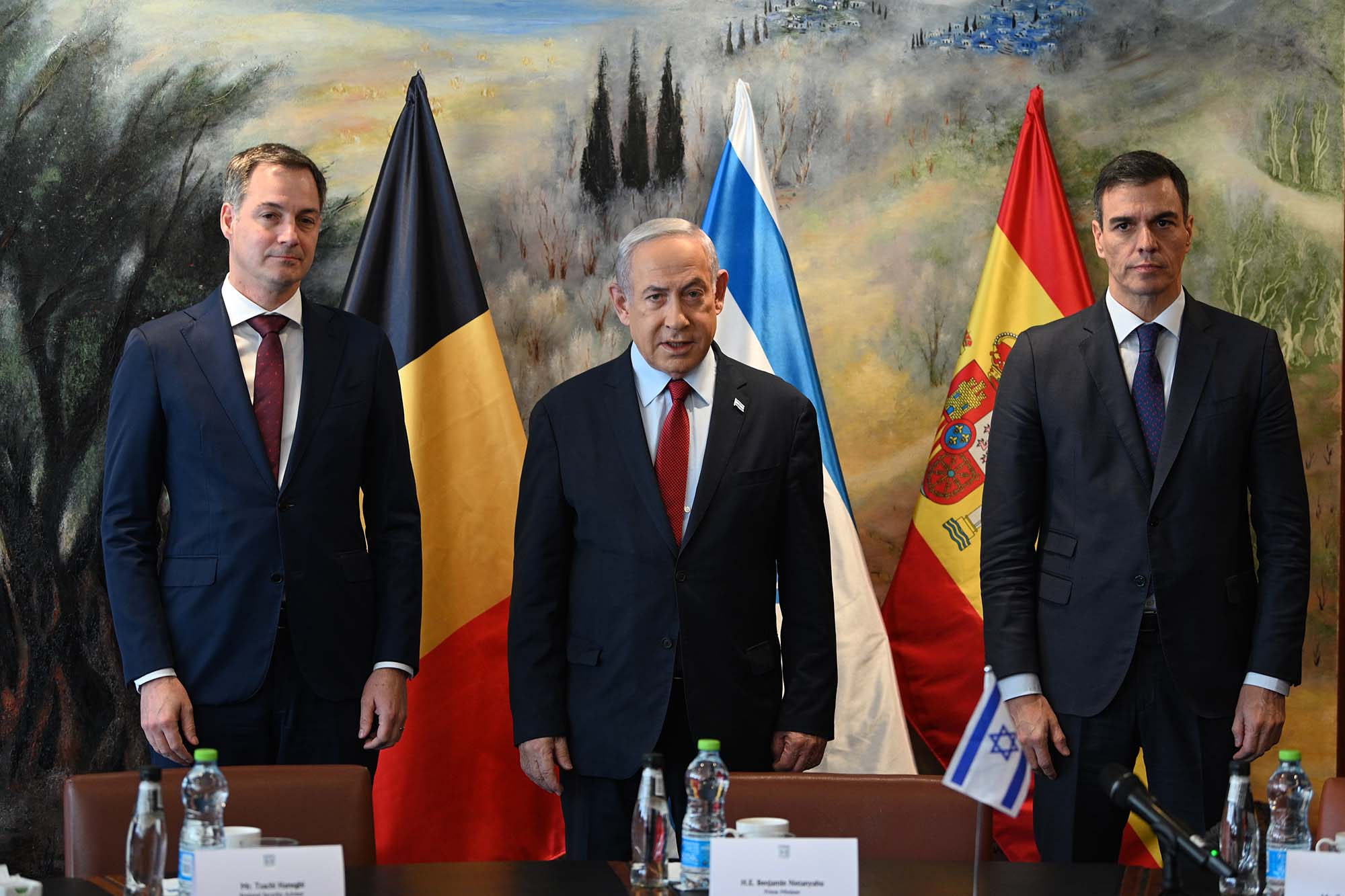
Alexander De Croo, Benjamin Netanyahu and Pedro Sánchez, 23 November 2023

European Commission President Ursula von der Leyen and European Parliament President Roberta Metsola arrived in Israel on 13 October.

On 17 October, German Chancellor Olaf Scholz visited Israel to express solidarity with the country. On his departure from Ben-Gurion airport, he was evacuated to a shelter after a rocket alarm went off.

On 21 October 2023, Italian Prime Minister Giorgia Meloni visited Israel to express solidarity with the country. French President Emmanuel Macron arrived in Israel on 24 October. Czech Prime Minister Petr Fiala arrived in Israel on 25 October. During the visit of Spanish Prime Minister Pedro Sánchez and Belgian Prime Minister Alexander De Croo, after Israel had launched the invasion of the Gaza Strip the month before, Netanyahu was asked to respect international law, and Sánchez announced that Spain is ready to recognize the State of Palestine. They held a press conference at the Rafah border crossing, emphasizing the importance of Israel's adherence to international humanitarian law. This triggered a harsh reaction from Israeli foreign minister Eli Cohen, who subsequently accused both prime ministers of "giving support to terrorism" in Israel.

Serving European Union heads of state and government that have visited Israel during the war
| State | Office | Leader | Date | References |
|---|---|---|---|---|
| (Europe) European Commission | President | Ursula von der Leyen | 13 October 2023 | |
| Romania | Prime Minister | Marcel Ciolacu | 17 October 2023 | |
| Germany | Chancellor | Olaf Scholz | 17 October 2023 | |
| Italy | Prime Minister | Giorgia Meloni | 21 October 2023 | |
| Cyprus | President | Nikos Christodoulides | 21 October 2023 | |
| Greece | Prime Minister | Kyriakos Mitsotakis | 23 October 2023 | |
| Netherlands | Prime Minister | Mark Rutte | 23 October 2023 | |
| France | President | Emmanuel Macron | 24 October 2023 | |
| Czech Republic | Prime Minister | Petr Fiala | 25 October 2023 | |
| Austria | Chancellor | Karl Nehammer | 25 October 2023 | |
| Hungary | President | Katalin Novák | 5 November 2023 | |
| Bulgaria | Prime Minister | Nikolai Denkov | 6 November 2023 | |
| Latvia | President | Edgars Rinkēvičs | 20 November 2023 | |
| Spain | Prime Minister | Pedro Sánchez | 23 November 2023 | |
| Belgium | Prime Minister | Alexander De Croo | 23 November 2023 | |
| Germany | President | Frank-Walter Steinmeier | 26 November 2023 | |
| Czech Republic | President | Petr Pavel | 15 January 2024 | |
| Greece | Prime Minister | Kyriakos Mitsotakis | 30 March 2025 | |

European Commission President Ursula von der Leyen was criticised for supporting Israel and not calling for a ceasefire while EU's foreign ministers condemned the attack by Hamas but also “called for the protection of civilians and restraint, the release of hostages, for allowing access to food, water and medicines to Gaza in line with international humanitarian law.” Some EU member states — Ireland, Spain, Belgium, Luxembourg, Slovenia, and Denmark — called her out for what they saw as an usurpation of the European Council foreign policy prerogatives.

The EU's foreign policy chief Josep Borrell has been more critical of Israel, calling the country's siege of Gaza illegal and dismissing its evacuation order as unrealistic. As European Union High Representative for Foreign Affairs and Security Policy, he condemned the "barbaric and terrorist attack" by Hamas on Israel which started the Gaza war. On 10 October 2023, Borrell accused Israel of breaking international law by imposing a total blockade of the Gaza Strip. On 3 January 2024, he condemned the comments of the Israeli ministers Itamar Ben-Gvir and Bezalel Smotrich, writing, "Forced displacements are strictly prohibited as a grave violation of [international humanitarian law] & words matter." In March 2024, Borrell said Israel's depriving food from Palestinians was a serious violation of international humanitarian law, and described the Al-Rashid humanitarian aid incident as "totally unacceptable carnage".

On 10 April 2024, the UN's special rapporteur on Palestine Francesca Albanese said that the EU should suspend ties with Israel to prevent crimes of genocide in Gaza, supporting the initiative made by Ireland and Spain for a review of the EU-Israel agreement as she said that under the current situation, Israel has "no incentive whatsoever to change conduct".

=== UNRWA ===
The United Nations Relief and Works Agency for Palestine Refugees in the Near East (UNRWA) is a UN agency that supports the relief and human development of Palestinian refugees, being the only UN agency dedicated to helping refugees from a specific region or conflict.

On 26 January 2024, the United Nations Relief and Works Agency for Palestine Refugees in the Near East (UNRWA) announced it was investigating allegations, presented to it by Israel nearly two weeks before, of the involvement of a dozen of its employees in the 2023 Hamas-led attack on Israel, with 12 UNRWA employees allegedly involved in the attacks, and spreading allegations that around ten percent of the UNRWA's 13,000 employees in the Gaza Strip have connections to Islamist militant groups. This accusation led to temporary suspension of funding to the organization by many European Union members, including Germany, Sweden, the Netherlands, Italy, Austria, Finland, Romania, Latvia, Lithuania and Estonia. This funds halt was criticized by several international organizations "considering the humanitarian situation in the Gaza Strip", and led to other EU members—namely Spain, Portugal and Ireland—to increase their funding of UNRWA. Among the top ten individual European Union donors, France, Denmark, Spain, Belgium and Ireland did not halt their donations. The EU, which had suspended funding pending the outcome of the UNRWA investigations, restored and increased its funding on 1 March 2024 as so did Sweden after receiving assurances of extra checks on its spending and personnel.

On 29 January 2024, Josep Borrell, High Representative of the European Union for Foreign Affairs and Security Policy, told UN Secretary-General António Guterres that funding has not been suspended and the EU will determine funding decisions after the investigation. Borrell stated, "We shouldn't let allegations cloud UNRWA's indispensable and great work."

On 1 March 2024, the EU decided not to await the outcome of the UNRWA investigation, and instead put in place a €275 million funding package, being restoration of 2024 funding of €82 million, plus €125 million of humanitarian aid for Palestinians for 2024, which UNRWA is not excluded from implementing and another €68 million through international partners like the Red Cross and the Red Crescent. At the same time, the EU reached an agreement with UNRWA on an audit to be made by EU appointed external experts.

Spanish Foreign minister José Manuel Albares stated on 29 January 2024 that Spain "will not change our relationship with UNRWA, although we are closely following the internal investigation and the outcome it may yield for the actions of a dozen people out of about 30,000" because the UNRWA is an agency "essential to alleviate the humanitarian situation". The same day, Spanish Social Affairs minister Pablo Bustinduy called out the suspension of UNRWA funds by other western countries "an unjustifiable collective punishment of the Palestinian people".

More than a year later, in October 2025, it was revealed that Spain had threatened EU Commission president Ursula von der Leyen with blocking "other European Council decisions" if the European Union decided to block UNRWA funding.

=== Flour massacre ===
On 29 February 2024 at least 118 people were killed and 760 injured after Israeli forces opened fire on civilians seeking food from aid trucks near to the Al-Nabulsi Roundabout on the coastal Al-Rashid Street in Gaza City

Following the incident, French foreign minister Stéphane Séjourné stated, "We will demand explanations and there will need to be an independent investigation."." The European External Action Service stated that many of the dead and wounded were "hit by Israeli army fire" and called for an independent investigation. The office of EU foreign policy chief Josep Borrell called for an "impartial international investigation on this tragic event". Foreign ministers of Belgium, Germany and Italy condemned the attack, while Spanish foreign minister claimed that this "underlines the urgency of a ceasefire"

=== World Central Kitchen drone strikes ===
On 1 April 2024 Israeli drones targeted a three-car convoy belonging to the World Central Kitchen (WCK) in the Gaza Strip, killing seven aid workers. The attack occurred despite the WCK having coordinated their route with the Israeli military, which both parties have acknowledged

The attack drew widespread international condemnation and led the World Central Kitchen to pause its operations in the Gaza Strip, along with other humanitarian and aid organizations operating there. Statements made by the Israeli ambassador in Poland on the incident led to a diplomatic spat between the two countries, as Israel's ambassador to Poland Yacov Livne, a few hours after the shelling of the WCK convoy, made several posts on social media, rejecting accusations of committing a war crime made by Deputy Speaker of the Polish Sejm Krzysztof Bosak. The ambassador wrote that the "extreme right and left in Poland" were accusing Israel of "intentional murder in the attack." He ended his statement by saying that anti-Semites will always remain anti-Semites. The ambassador's statement sparked outrage. Polish President Andrzej Duda described it as "not very fortunate and, in short, outrageous," while Polish Prime Minister Donald Tusk said he did not approve of the way the ambassador spoke about the shelling of the convoy and that he expected words of apology. The incident led to the ambassador being summoned to the Polish Foreign Ministry on 5 April 2024.

Belgium, Ireland and Cyprus called for an immediate investigation on the incident, while Spanish Prime minister Pedro Sánchez said he was "expecting and demanding an explanation from the Israeli government" for the deaths of the seven aid workers. After the explanations given by the IDF and Prime Minister Netanyahu, Sánchez deemed them "completely unacceptable and insufficient".

=== April 2024 Iranian strikes in Israel ===
On 13 April 2024, the Islamic Revolutionary Guards Corps (IRGC), a branch of the Iranian military—in coordination with the Popular Mobilization Forces of Iraq, Lebanese group Hezbollah, and the Houthis of Yemen—launched hundreds of airstrikes, codenamed Operation True Promise (Persian: وعده صادق, romanized: va'de-ye sādeq), against Israel and the Israeli-occupied Golan Heights, (Note: Internationally recognized as Syrian territory, occupied and claimed by Israel, recognized as Israeli by the United States) with drones, cruise missiles and ballistic missiles. The operation was in retaliation to the Israeli airstrike on the Iranian embassy in Damascus on 1 April that killed 16 people. It was Iran's first direct attack on Israel and the first direct conflict since the start of the Iran–Israel proxy conflict.

The attack was the biggest drone strike in history, intended to saturate anti-missile defences, and the first time since 1991 Iraqi attacks that Israel was attacked directly by the military of another state. Iran's attacks have drawn criticism from the United Nations, several world leaders, and political analysts, who warned that they risk escalating into a full-blown regional war.

On 13 April, Cypriot President Nikos Christodoulides called for an emergency meeting of the National Security Council which was held on 14 April to discuss the developments in the region. Additionally, the Ministry of Foreign Affairs condemned the attack on Israel. Furthermore, the Ministry of Foreign Affairs as a precautionary measure enacted the "Estia" plan.

Chancellor Olaf Scholz condemned the Iranian attack as "unjustifiable and highly irresponsible", and assured that "Germany stands by Israel". French President Emmanuel Macron, along with other leaders, put pressure on Israel not to respond to the attack, in order to avoid escalation in the regional conflict. Foreign policy chief Josep Borrell "strongly condemned" Iran's attack and called it "an unprecedented escalation and a grave threat to regional security".

=== Rafah military operation ===
The Rafah offensive is an ongoing offensive in the city of Rafah, the southernmost area of the Gaza Strip, part of Israel's invasion of the strip during the Gaza war. When ceasefire talks faltered, Israel entered Rafah on 6 May 2024, taking control of the Palestinian side of the Rafah crossing. after ordering the evacuation of Palestinians from eastern Rafah to areas in central Gaza and Khan Yunis. Later that day, Hamas accepted a ceasefire deal proposed by Egypt and Qatar, but Israel did not accept the ceasefire deal and indicated that the offensive would continue before any pause. Israel conducted airstrikes on Rafah the same day, and seized the Rafah crossing.

This operation triggered the response of many EU leaders, mostly condemning the actions as "alarming" and "concerning". Foreign policy chief Josep Borrell stated, "Reports of an Israeli military offensive on Rafah are alarming. It would have catastrophic consequences worsening the already dire humanitarian situation and the unbearable civilian toll." Previously on 19 February, every single member state of the European Union, with the exception of Hungary, asked the Israeli military not to take military action in Rafah.

- Belgium: Prime Minister Alexander De Croo has warned that Israel's incursion "would cause a further unmitigated humanitarian catastrophe and result in the death of numerous innocent civilians, again mostly children and women."
- Denmark: The Ministry of Foreign Affairs made a statement on X, said that "Denmark shares the concern of EU and others regarding a potential Israeli military offensive in Rafah where more than half of Gaza's population is seeking refuge."
- France: Foreign Minister Stéphane Séjourné stated an Israeli assault on Rafah would be unjustified. In a phone call, Emmanuel Macron told Netanyahu that he was opposed to a military invasion of Rafah. On 16 February, Macron stated, "I share the fears of Jordan and Egypt of a forced and massive displacement of the population".
- Germany: Foreign Minister Annalena Baerbock stated, "Taking action now in Rafah, the last and most overcrowded place, as announced by the Israeli defence minister, would simply not be justifiable". On 14 February, Baerbock stated, "If the Israeli army were to launch an offensive on Rafah... it would be a humanitarian catastrophe." On 17 February, Chancellor Olaf Scholz reaffirmed Germany's support for Israel's "security", but also warned Israeli leaders to abide by international law. On 16 March, Scholz stated, "There is a danger that a comprehensive offensive in Rafah will result in many terrible civilian casualties, which must be strictly prohibited".
- Ireland: Micheál Martin stated an Israeli invasion of Rafah would entail "grave violations of international humanitarian law".
- Italy: Prime Minister Giorgia Meloni stated, "We will reiterate our opposition to military action on the ground by Israel in Rafah that could have even more catastrophic consequences for the civilians".
- Luxembourg: Foreign Minister Xavier Bettel told Israel they risked losing "the last support they have in the world" if they attacked Rafah.
- Netherlands: Foreign Minister, Hanke Bruins Slot, stated that Israel's planned assault on Rafah was "unjustifiable". Prime Minister Mark Rutte stated, "An Israeli offensive in Rafah would cause a humanitarian disaster".
- Slovenia: The Prime Minister Robert Golob stated, "There is a common consensus in saying that we should do everything we can to prevent an attack on Rafah."
- Spain: The country signed a joint statement with the government of Ireland stating, "The expanded Israeli military operation in the Rafah area poses a grave and imminent threat that the international community must urgently confront".

=== Trump plan for the Gaza Strip ===
On 4 February 2025, Trump revealed the plan during a joint press conference in the White House East Room with Israeli Prime Minister Benjamin Netanyahu. The plan calls for a temporary relocation of a significant portion of the Palestinian population in Gaza to Egypt, Jordan and other countries. Countries such as Spain, France, the United Kingdom, Slovenia, Poland, Belgium and Germany - Israel's most staunch supporter within the European Union - voiced their opposition to any relocation or displacement of the Palestinian population. Following the announcement, Israel Defence minister Israel Katz made a controversial statement, stating that countries such as Spain, Ireland and Norway should now be "legally obligated to allow any Gaza resident to enter their territories" after making "levelled accusations and false claims against Israel over its actions in Gaza", or otherwise their hypocrisy would be exposed. José Manuel Albares, Spanish foreign minister, rejected Israel's suggestion, stating that "the land of Palestinian Gazans is Gaza" and that "no third party should tell us what to do". Irish Taoiseach Micheál Martin deemed the comments made my Katz as "provocative" and a distraction, and that the only solution is a "two-state solution".

=== EU sanctions against Israel ===
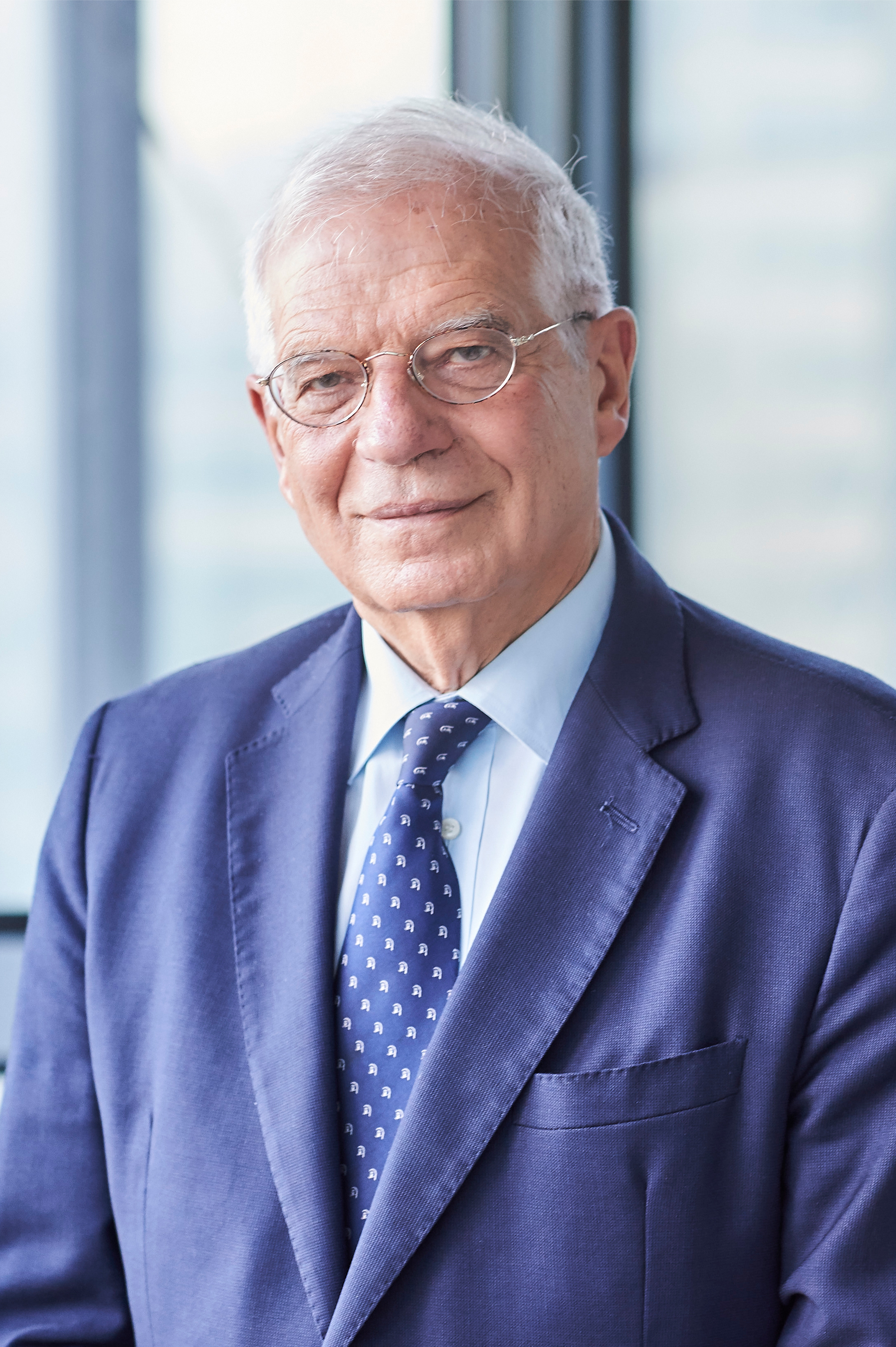
Josep Borrell, High Representative of the Union for Foreign Affairs when the October 7 attacks took place, is one of the most outspoken critics of Israel's actions. He was replaced in November 2024 by Kaja Kallas following the inauguration of the second Von der Leyen Commission. Kallas has been criticised for her close support to Israel.

In May 2025, Dutch Foreign Minister Caspar Veldkamp argued that Israel's blockade of the Gaza Strip was a violation of international law and therefore of the EU–Israel Association Agreement. There were increasing calls for the full suspension of the association agreement.

On 15 July 2025, the EU's top diplomat Kaja Kallas and the foreign ministers of the EU member states decided not to take any action against Israel over alleged Israeli war crimes in the Gaza war and settler violence in the West Bank. The proposed sanctions against Israel included suspending the EU-Israel Association Agreement, suspending visa-free travel, or blocking imports from Israeli settlements. Israel considered the EU's decision not to impose sanctions on Israel as a diplomatic victory. Palestinian Foreign Minister Varsen Aghabekian criticized the decision, saying, "It's shocking and disappointing, because everything is crystal clear. ... The whole world has been seeing what is happening in Gaza. The killing, the atrocities, the war crimes." Slovenian Foreign Minister Tanja Fajon posted on social media: "It is disappointing that there is no EU consensus to act on the June determination that Israel is violating Article 2 of the association agreement, concerning human rights." Following the EU's decision, on 1 August 2025 Slovenian prime minister Robert Golob announced that the country would impose a "full arms embargo" on Israel, becoming the first EU country to do so. On the same day, former European Union High Representative Josep Borrell, Kallas' predecessor, called for the European Union to stop being complicit with the "genocide in Gaza", and called for sanctions to be swiftly applied on Israel. Borrell has been an outspoken critic of Israel actions, defining them in multiple occasions as "ethnic cleansing", and the "most dramatic situation since World War II". He has also called out the European Union's hypocrisy, comparing the situation and actions of the international body during the ongoing Russian invasion of Ukraine, and drawing similarities to the inaction during the Srebenica genocide in Serbia.

On 29 July, Dutch minister of Foreign Affairs Caspar Veldkamp announced that Israeli ministers Bezalel Smotrich and Itamar Ben-Gvir had been banned from entering the country for their calls to "ethnic cleansing" in the Gaza strip.

On 31 July, Slovenia became the first European nation to impose a full arms embargo on Israel, after its prime minister had already stated that the country would "act independently" if the European Union failed to take concrete actions against Israel by mid-June.

In September 2026, Avi Pazner, issued a stark warning: if Israel's policies continue on their current course, the country could find itself facing international sanctions on a scale it has never faced before. Pointing to the sanctions the international community once imposed on South Africa during the apartheid era, Pazner suggested that Israel could suffer a similar fate. He noted that while the measures taken primarily target Israeli settlements and the West Bank, they have the potential to expand to broader sanctions against all of Israel.

=== Full-scale occupation of Gaza ===
On 4 August 2025, it was reported that prime minister Netanyahu was deciding on a full-scale occupation of the Gaza strip. Spanish foreign minister José Manuel Albares said that it would be a "completely illegal move" and recognized that Europe had done "too little, too late" against Israel actions, accusing Netanyahu of wanting to turn the strip into a "massive graveyard". On 8 August, following Israel's plan to seize Gaza city, German chancellor Friedrich Merz announced a halt in its military exports to Israel "that could be used in Gaza", a decision described as "unprecedent" due to Germany's strong support to Israel in modern times. On 10 August, the governments of Spain, Iceland, Ireland, Luxembourg, Malta, Portugal and Slovenia, along with Norway, issued a joint statement condemning the Israeli occupation of the Gaza strip.

On 23 August, following the refusal of some cabinet members to secure sanctions against Israel, Dutch foreign minister and former ambassador to Israel Caspar Veldkamp resigned from his position along with other members of his party in the cabinet. On 26 August 209 former EU ambassadors, senior diplomatic staff and ambassadors from EU nation states published a public letter calling for "urgent action" over Israel's actions in Gaza. On 4 September, European Union First Vice-President Teresa Ribera labelled Israel's actions of the Gaza strip as "genocidal", becoming the highest EU official to use such words.

On September 8, the Spanish government announced a new package of measures against Israel, including a full arms embargo on Israel, the prohibition of fuel ships transiting through Spanish ports, the denial of airspace access to aircraft carrying weapons bound for Israel and entry into Spain to all persons "participating in genocide", a ban on imports of products from illegal settlements and a limitation of consular services to Spanish citizens residing in those settlements. Prime minister Sánchez added that these measures were aimed at "adding pressure on [Prime Minister] Netanyahu and his government to alleviate some of the suffering endured by the Palestinian people and also to ensure that Spanish society as a whole knows and feels that, in the face of one of the most infamous episodes of the 21st century, their country, Spain, was on the right side of history“ and lamented that the indifference and complicity of part of the international community with Netanyahu's government have prevented ”the tragedy from being stopped." Following the announcement of these measures, the Israeli minister of Foreign Affairs, Gideon Sa'ar, announced that Second deputy prime minister Yolanda Díaz and minister of Youth Sira Rego would be prohibited from entering the country, and labeled Sánchez's government as "corrupt" and "antisemitic". Díaz later welcomed the decision as "an honor". Spain also recalled its ambassador in Israel after Sa'ar's declaration, the first European nation to take such kind of measure. The next day, the Spanish government announced it was banning Israeli ministers Itamar Ben–Gvir and Bezalel Smotrich from entering the country.

On September 10, European Commission president Ursula von der Leyen called for the suspension of the EU-Israel trade agreement in a u-turn from her previous position on the issue, criticising Israel's plans to establish new settlements in the West Bank as "undermining the two-state solution", as well as proposing drafting sanctions against "Israeli extremist ministers" and violent settlers in the West Bank. On the next day, the European Parliament approved a non-binding resolution calling for its member states to recognize the State of Palestine and approved von der Leyen's plan to partially suspend the commercial agreement between the European Union and Israel.

On September 17, the European Commission proposed a €227.000.000 tariff against Israel, in order to "try to improve humanitarian situation in Gaza". The Commission also proposed the suspension of an EU-Israel financial support treaty and sanctions against Israeli ministers Itamar Ben–Gvir and Bezalel Smotrich.

=== Global Sumud Flotilla ===
The Global Sumud Flotilla, an international, civil society-led maritime initiative launched in mid-2025 aiming to break the Israeli blockade of the Gaza Strip, comprising over 40 vessels with 500 participants from more than 44 countries, set sail late August 2025 with delegations and convoys departing Otranto, Genoa, and Barcelona, followed by Catania, Syros, and Tunis early September. Among the participants are citizens from 20 member countries of the European Union.

From 27 September onwards it was reported that the Spanish, Italian, Greek and Turkish governments were all monitoring the Flotilla at the same time, but on 30 September, it was announced that the Italian Navy would stop escorting the Flotilla at the end of the very same day once it had reached a distance of 150 nautical miles from Gaza alongside the NGO Emergency. On the same day, the Spanish government also confirmed that its navy would not escort the Flotilla once it reaches a distance of 120 nautical miles from Gaza.

At 17:25 UTC of the 1 October, Israel sent its first signal to halt all operations to the Flotilla, and at 17:30 UTC, it was reported that the Flotilla expected to be intercepted by the Israeli Navy in the following hour. Around that time, Alma was approached by two rigid inflatable boats (RIB). It was later confirmed at 17:45 UTC that interception had officially begun. Despite this, at around 18:00 UTC it was announced that the mission would continue and that the boats that were not intercepted would still attempt to break the blockade. Italian minister of defence Crosetto stated that the intercepted participants would be sent to the port of Ashdod. Soon after, rockets from the Gaza Strip attempted to strike the city of Ashdod, with all the rockets being intercepted. At 18:45 UTC it was reported that Israeli forces allegedly used water cannons against the Yulara ship and various explosions were also allegedly heard (at the time of the incident the Flotilla was 65 nautical miles from Gaza); The Israeli later were reported to have used water cannons on the Meteque ship at around 21:10 UTC. Around that time, it was reported that the total number of intercepted ships of the Flotilla was six. It was reported that another three ships were stopped by the time 22:20 UTC. At around 23:00 UTC the Flotilla reported that the Israeli Navy allegedly attempted to sink one of the Flotilla's ships, namely the Maria Cristina. By 23:55 UTC 12 vessels were reported to be intercepted. By 00:40 UTC the vessels that were intercepted were 13. At 01:00 UTC the Flotilla stated that 30 ships were still heading towards Gaza, and that the Flotilla was roughly located around 46 nautical miles from Gaza. As the morning approached by the time 05:45 UTC, 20 boats had been intercepted. By 07:10 UTC, 23 boats were still sailing towards Gaza according to its own tracker. The ship that had got the closest to Gaza, Mikeno, reached 8,9 nautical miles from Gaza before communications were lost.

In the evening of Israel intercepting the flotilla, spontaneous protests occurred in various places around Europe. In Italy there were protests involving thousands of participants; hundreds protested at the Termini station in Rome and other protests were triggered in Bari, Bologna, Genoa, Milan, Palermo and other cities. With protests spreading across the country, a university building in Turin was occupied by students and activists occupied railway tracks at Torino Porta Nuova as well as in Pisa and Naples. Elsewhere protesters mobilised in support of the flotilla at the Central Station in Berlin, Germany; in Barcelona, Spain, people protested outside the Israeli consulate and a protest is expected in Madrid. In Brussels, Belgium, protesters marched to the Belgian foreign ministry.

Yolanda Díaz, the Spanish Minister of Labour stated that the interceptions were a crime against international law, stating the EU should cut all relations with Israel. This came after the statement of the Spanish Foreign Ministry asking for the rights of the citizens on board to be respected. The Spanish government also summoned Israel's representative in the country.

== Position in international bodies ==
A map that shows the countries and their respective voting in the United Nations General Assembly resolution ES-10/21 calling for an "immediate and sustained" humanitarian truce and cessation of hostilities. In favor Against Abstentions Absent Non member

A map that shows the countries and their respective voting in the United Nations General Assembly resolution ES-10/22 calling for an immediate ceasefire in the Gaza war, "immediate and unconditional" hostage release, "ensuring humanitarian access" and that "all parties comply with their obligations under international law" In favor Against Abstentions Absent Non member

A map that shows the countries and their respective voting in the United Nations General Assembly resolution ES-10/23 which upgraded Palestine's rights in the United Nations as an Observer State, without offering full membership. State of Palestine In favor Against Abstentions Absent Non member

Within the European Union, positions remain divided. Belgium, Ireland, Luxembourg and Spain are among the sharpest critics of Israel's actions in the Gaza Strip, with some such as Prime Minister of Spain Pedro Sánchez calling for the international recognition of the Palestinian State "before July [2024]".

On 27 October, the United Nations General Assembly held a vote that saw 120 countries pass a resolution calling for a humanitarian ceasefire and demanding aid be allowed into Gaza. Eight EU countries — Belgium, France, Ireland, Luxembourg, Malta, Portugal, Slovenia and Spain — voted for the resolution, while 15 EU members abstained from that vote. Austria, Croatia, the Czech Republic and Hungary voted against the resolution. On 12 December, the UN voted again a similar resolution, with only Austria and the Czech Republic voting against while Cyprus, Denmark, Finland, Greece, Poland and Sweden voted in favor for the first time.

Following the South Africa's case against Israel before the International Court of Justice, it received the support of Ireland and Slovenia, while government ministers in Belgium and Spain stated that they were working on making their governments support the suit. On the other side, Austria, Czechia, France, Germany, Hungary and Italy stated their opposition to this case, with the Hungarian Foreign Minister condemning the "legal attack launched against Israel" and German Foreign Minister Annalena Baerbock stating that "Israel's self-defence" against Hamas cannot be considered genocide". On 26 January 2024, the Spanish government issued a statement celebrating the ICJ's decision in regard of the Application of the Convention on the Prevention and Punishment of the Crime of Genocide in the Gaza Strip (South Africa v. Israel), calling on all parties "to respect and comply with these measures in their entirety". The European Commission and the High Representative issued a joint communication endorsing the International Court of Justice's order on South Africa's request for the indication of provisional measures in regard of the Application of the Convention on the Prevention and Punishment of the Crime of Genocide in the Gaza Strip (South Africa v. Israel), noting that "Orders of the International Court of Justice are binding on the Parties and they must comply with them".

On 18 January 2024, the European Parliament passed a resolution calling for a permanent ceasefire, although conditional on Hamas releasing the hostages they made on 7 October attacks, as included by the European People's Party as an unnegotiable condition for their support, resulting in 312 MEPs voting in favor, 131 voting against and 72 abstaining.

On 14 February 2024, Spanish Prime Minister Sánchez along with Irish Taoiseach Leo Varadkar demanded in a joint letter to the EU Commission president Ursula von der Leyen and the EU's High Representative for Foreign Affairs and Security Policy Josep Borrell to assess whether Israel is complying with the obligations regarding human rights stipulated in the EU–Israel Association Agreement, and to take immediate measures in case of a breach in the agreement

On 22 March, Spain, Ireland, Slovenia and Malta announced they were ready to recognise the State of Palestine in a joint statement as the best way to achieve "long-lasting peace in the region". On 10 April, prior to a meeting with the heads of government of Norway, Ireland, Portugal, Slovenia and Belgium to push for a joint position, Spanish Prime Minister Sánchez stated that recognizing Palestinian statehood "would redound in the geopolitical interest of Europe” A few days later after a meeting between newly appointed Taoiseach Simon Harris and Prime Minister Sánchez both reiterated their intention to forge an alliance of countries willing to recognize Palestinian statehood. Newly elected Prime Minister of Portugal Luís Montenegro later announced that his country would not go as far as Spain to recognize Palestinian statehood without a broader European common position.

On 1 March, Nicaragua announced that it was taking Germany to the International Criminal Court over weaponry supply to Israel and the suspended German funding of the UNRWA, accusing the country of allowing genocide to happen. However, on 30 April the Court ruled that no emergency orders to stop Germany's arms sales to Israel was in need.

Ireland and Spain, along with non-EU member Norway, officially recognized Palestinian statehood on 28 May 2024, followed by Slovenia on 5 June 2024. Following the Israeli attack on an UNRWA school on 6 June 2024, Spain announced that it was joining the South Africa's case against Israel before the International Criminal Court.

In June 2025, UN Special Rapporteur Francesca Albanese said that EU officials like Ursula von der Leyen and Kaja Kallas were complicit in Israel's war crimes in Gaza.

=== Recognition of Palestinian statehood ===
Following the outbreak of the Gaza war, various European Union countries have moved forward to recognize Palestinian statehood as a step towards the two-State solution. On 26 August, German chancellor announced that Germany would not be following other European nations' steps in recognizing Palestinian statehood.

Several European Union member states had already recognized Palestinian statehood prior to the Gaza war.
| State | Date | References |
|---|---|---|
| Cyprus | 18 November 1988 | |
| Slovakia | 18 November 1988 | |
| Hungary | 23 November 1988 | |
| (Romania) Romania | 24 November 1988 | |
| (Bulgaria) Bulgaria | 25 November 1988 | |
| (Poland) Poland | 14 December 1988 | |
| (Sweden) Sweden | 30 October 2014 | |

Several European Union countries have recognized Palestinian statehood after the outbreak of the Gaza war.
| State | Leader | Date | References |
|---|---|---|---|
| (Republic of Ireland) Ireland | Simon Harris | 28 May 2024 | |
| Spain | Pedro Sánchez | 28 May 2024 | |
| Slovenia | Robert Golob | 4 June 2024 | |
| Portugal | Luís Montenegro | 21 September 2025 | |
| France | Emmanuel Macron | 22 September 2025 | |
| Luxembourg | Luc Frieden | 22 September 2025 | |
| Malta | Robert Abela | 22 September 2025 | |

== Sanctions applied to Israel and EU member states positions ==
As of October 2025
| State | Arms embargo | Logistical restrictions | Ban on settlements imports | Entry ban (people) | Recognition of Palestine | Calls/Review of EU-Israel Association Agreement | Military Cooperation Suspension | Diplomatic Actions | Part of the South Africa genocide case |
|---|---|---|---|---|---|---|---|---|---|
| (Europe) European Union | No | No | No | No | - | - | No | No | No |
| Austria | No | No | No | No | No | No | No | No | No (Opposes) |
| Belgium | No | No | No | No | No | Yes | No | No | Yes |
| Czech Republic | No | No | No | No | No | No (Blocked) | No | No | No (Opposes) |
| Finland | No | No | No | No | No | Yes | No | No | No |
| France | No (selective restrictions only) | No | No | No | No | Yes | No | No | No (Opposes) |
| Germany | No (except possible Gaza use) | No | No | No | No | No (Blocked) | Yes (Blocked exports with possible use in Gaza) | No | No (Opposes) |
| Hungary | No | No | No | No | Yes | No (Blocked) | No | No | No (Opposes) |
| (Republic of Ireland) Ireland | No | No | No (Proposed, not applied) | No | Yes | Yes | No | Yes (Israeli embassy closed) | Yes |
| Italy | No | No | No | No | No | No | No | No | No (Opposes) |
| Luxembourg | No | No | No | No | No | Yes | No | No | No |
| Netherlands | No | No | No | Yes (Israeli ministers Ben-Gvir and Smotrich) | No | Yes | No | No | No |
| Poland | No | No | No | No | Yes | No | No | No | No |
| Portugal | No | No | No | No | No | Yes | No | No | No |
| Slovenia | Yes (total) | Yes (Military transit restricted) | Yes | Yes (Israeli ministers Ben-Gvir and Smotrich and Prime Minister Netanyahu) | Yes | Yes | No | No | Yes |
| Spain | Yes (total) | Yes (Military transit restricted) | Yes | Yes (citizens and ministers Ben-Gvir and Smotrich) | Yes | Yes | Yes | Yes (Both ambassadors recalled) | Yes |
| Sweden | No | No | No | No | Yes | Yes | No | No | No |

== Public opinion ==
According to a YouGov poll conducted in seven Western European nations in December 2023, the most pro-Israeli country was Germany, where 29% of respondents said they sympathized more with Israel, rather than Palestine (12%). However, the poll showed that sympathy primarily for Israel dipped across the countries surveyed. On the contrary, Spain was shown to be the most pro-Palestinian country, with 27% sympathizing with that side more, compared to 19% for Israel. In the same way, Spain (59%), followed by Italy (56%), tended to see Israel's attacks on Gaza in response to the 7 October attack as unjustified, while France was evenly divided.

YouGov repeated the polling among these seven nations in July 2024, finding a decline in public sympathy for Israel and an increase in sympathy for Palestine in all countries. The most pro-Israeli countries in July were France and Sweden, where 21% of their population identified as pro-Israel; but in Sweden a higher share said they are pro-Palestinian (25%) and in France the two sides were equal in size. Sympathy for Israel fell sharply to 19% in Germany, although the rise in the pro-Palestinian population was only modest, to 15% — the lowest percentage among the countries studied. Spain remained the most pro-Palestinian country, with 34% of the population taking this position, and the pro-Israel side dipping to 14% in July. Italy was the least pro-Israeli country, with 7% of the population taking that position, and, along with Britain, the second most pro-Palestinian, with 28%.

In a separate poll conducted commissioned by the Palestine Institute for Public Diplomacy in March, YouGov measured other views pertaining the war in five European countries: Belgium, France, Germany, Italy and Sweden. Between 33% and 49% of the population in these countries endorsed the view that Israel was committing genocide during the Gaza war, while 17% and 26% took the opposite view. A plurality of Germans (44%) and Italians (36%) believed their country was taking a pro-Israeli stance, while in Belgium (30%) and Sweden (29%) their governments were seen as being neutral. Only in Belgium did a higher percentage of the population believe their country favoured Palestine (19%) than favoured Israel (16%). In all five countries, a plurality of the population said they would prefer their government take an impartial stance, this being the case especially in Germany (37%). Between 12% and 24% of the population would like their government to be more supportive of Palestine, while 4% to 9% would like to see more support for Israel.

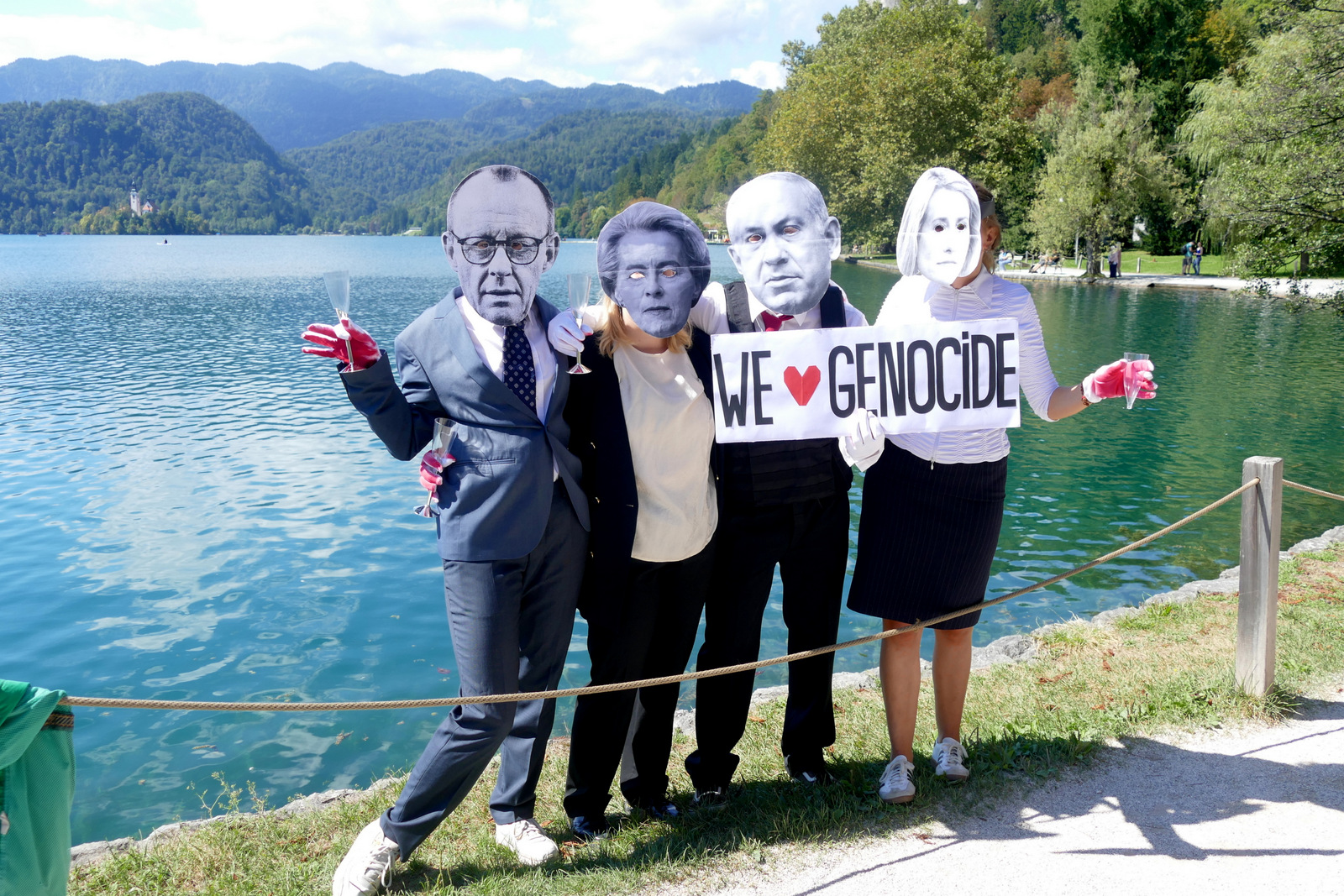
Protest in Slovenia against the alleged complicity of Kaja Kallas, Ursula von der Leyen and Friedrich Merz in the Gaza genocide, 1 September 2025

In all of these countries, between 50% and 65% of the population would approve of an arms embargo on Israel, while only 17% to 28% of the population would oppose such a measure. Legally prosecuting Israeli leaders for war crimes is supported by 49% to 62% of the population, and opposed by 16% to 25%.

According to a poll conducted by the Forsa Institute on behalf of German newspaper Die Welt in December 2023, 45% of respondents in Germany agreed with the statement, "Israel's military action in the Gaza Strip is all in all appropriate", whereas 43% disagreed. In the immediate aftermath of the Hamas attack on Israel, 44% of Germans said that their country had "a special obligation towards Israel"; however, in December 2023, that number dropped to 37%. In March 2024, 69% of Germans stated Israel's actions in Gaza were unjustified.

A survey commissioned by Baltic News Service in November of the same year found that 38.1% of respondents in Lithuania supported Israel's actions in Gaza, whereas 30.4% did not support them, and 31.5% had no opinion on the matter. Voters of the Homeland Union-Lithuanian Christian Democrats (58.8%), Union of Democrats "For Lithuania", Liberals' Movement and Freedom Party were most in favor of Israel's actions, while voters of Lithuanian Regions Party and People and Justice Union were least in favor.

According to an opinion poll aired by Greek TV channel Star Channel two days after the visit of Prime Minister of Greece Kyriakos Mitsotakis to Israel, 18.4% of Greeks were in favor of a pro-Israel position, whereas 11.5% wanted Greece to be openly pro-Palestinian.

Different polls released in Spain carried out by the Instituto Elcano have shown consistent support for Palestine in the conflict, with 78% in favor of Palestinian statehood and 82% believing that Israel is carrying out "a genocide" in Gaza.

== Protests in member countries ==
Since the 7 October attacks, as a slate of government buildings across Europe were lit up in blue-and-white in solidarity with Israel, and several EU countries, such as Germany and France, pro-Palestinian rallies have been banned in the name of ensuring public order and preventing the spread of anti-Semitism, receiving some criticism of free speech violations. However, since the start of the Israeli invasion of the Gaza Strip, many EU countries have seen widespread protests in support of Palestine and against Israel's actions.

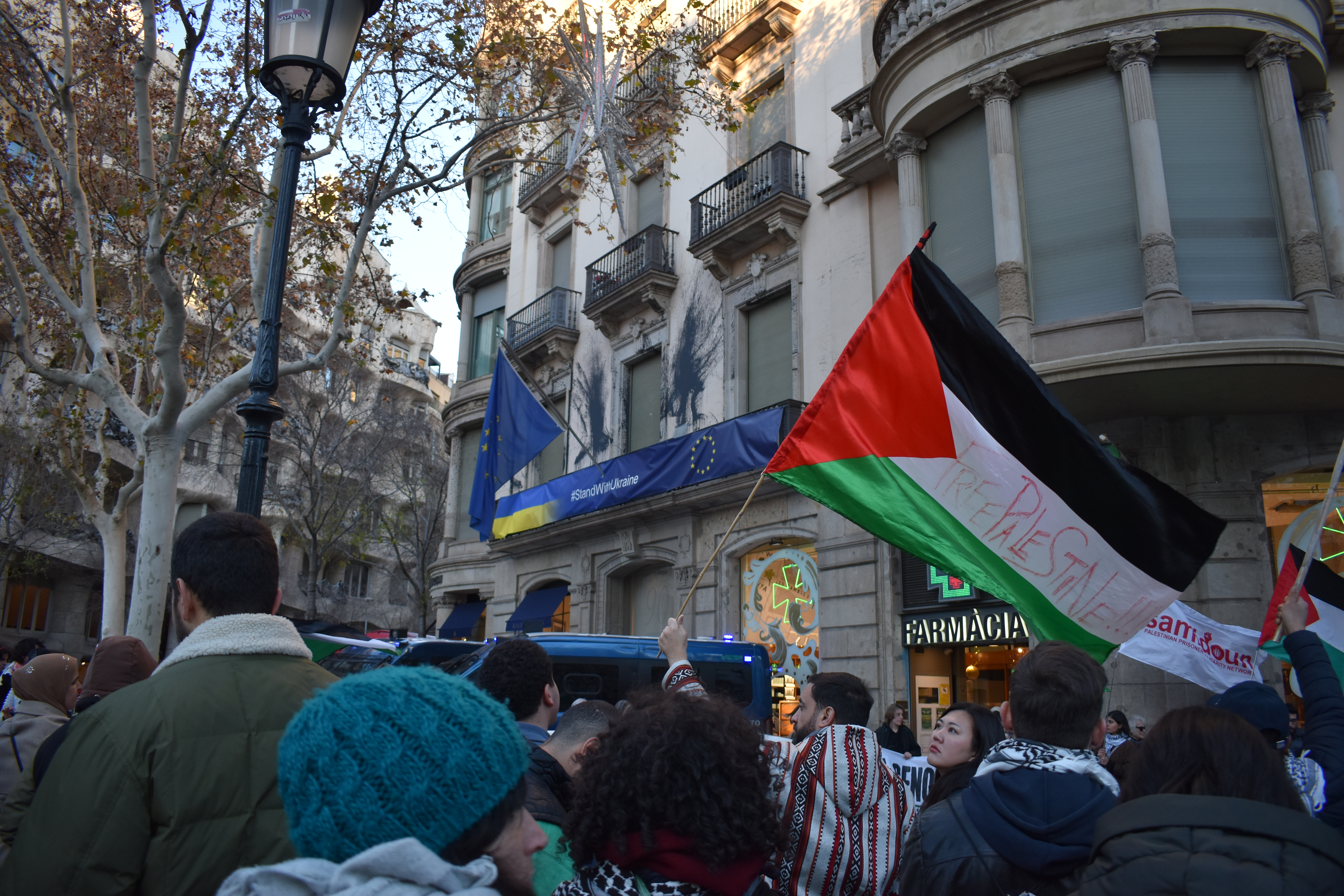
Protest in front of the European Commission branch in Barcelona, 7 January 2024

=== Austria ===
On 13 January 2024, a pro-Palestine march was held in Vienna as part of the "Global day of action".

=== Belgium ===
On 10 December 2023, about 4,000 people in Brussels waved Belgian flags and demonstrated against antisemitism amid concern over the rising number of antisemitic incidents in Europe from the Israel-Hamas war.

On 21 January 2024, protesters in Brussels demonstrated against the war and called for a permanent ceasefire. Ahead of a foreign ministers meeting in Brussels, a group of 100 prominent individuals, including former Irish president Mary Robinson and former Swedish foreign minister Margot Wallstrom, called on the EU to prevent the "unprecedented rate of civilian killing" in Gaza.

On 15 June 2025, more than 75,000 people protested in Brussels, asking for Israel to be sanctioned over its actions in Gaza, described as "genocidal".

=== Cyprus ===
On 15 October a pro-Palestinian protest was held in Larnaca. On 19 October, a protest in support of Gaza was held in Nicosia. Another pro-Palestinian protest was organised by the Cyprus Peace Council on 20 October attended by 2,000 protestors as well as MPs, mayors, the general secretary of AKEL and the Palestinian ambassador to Cyprus. On 17 October a pro-Israel rally was organised by the Israeli community. Protests were held at the UK's RAF Akrotiri base on 14 and 15 January 2024 after the base was used to launch airstrikes on Yemen.

=== Denmark ===
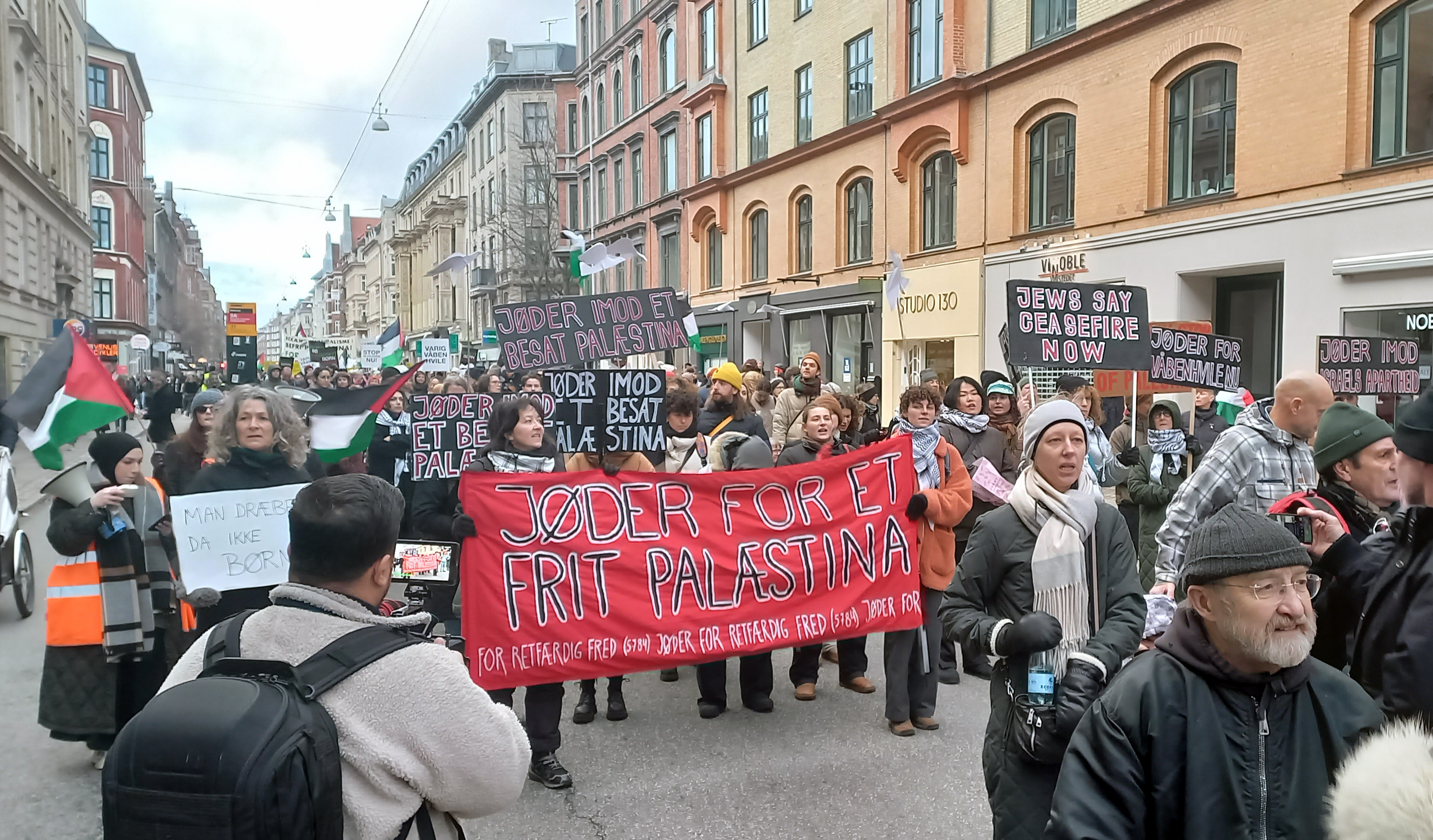
"Jews for a free Palestine" banner in Copenhagen, 2 February 2024

Protesters marched in support of Gaza in Copenhagen on 2 February 2024, chanting "Free Palestine" and "Palestine will never die".

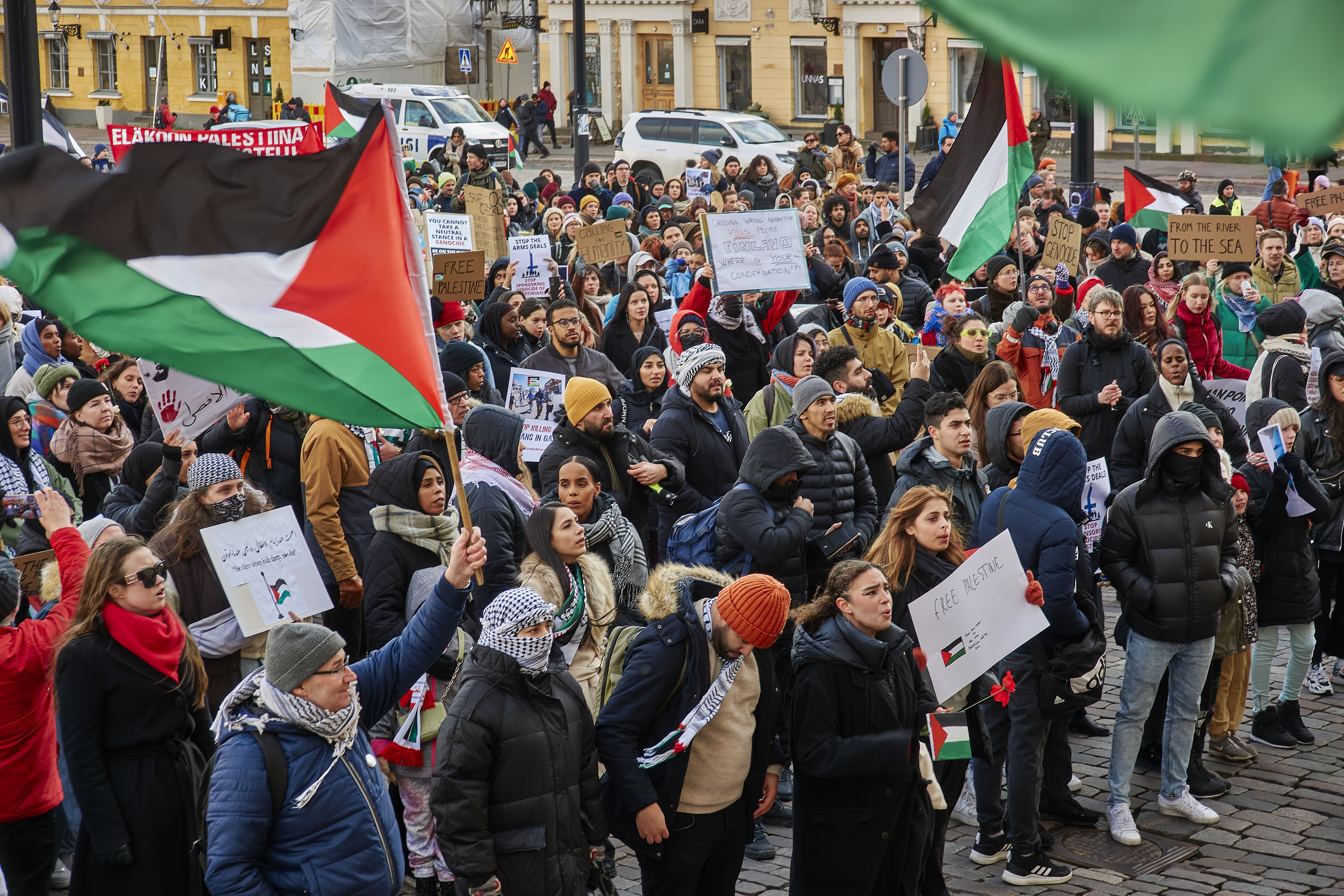
Pro-Palestinian protest in Helsinki, Finland, 21 October

=== France ===
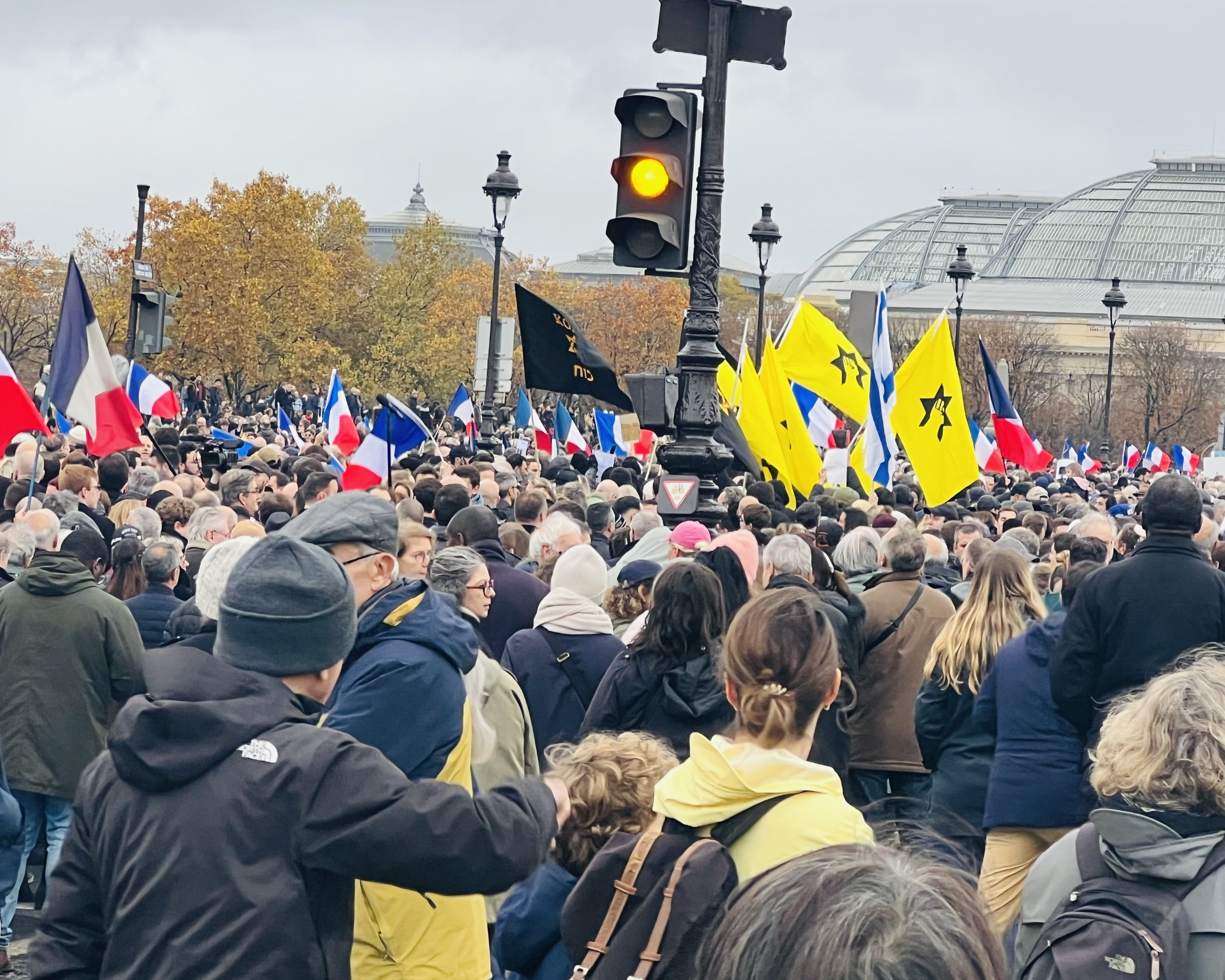
March for the Republic and Against Antisemitism in Paris, France, 12 November

In reaction to Khaled Meshaal's call for a "day of rage", the government put a prohibition on pro-Palestinian protests. Interior Minister Gérald Darmanin said that such gatherings were likely to cause disturbances to public order.

However, on the night of 12 October, police fired tear gas and water cannons to break up a banned pro-Palestinian rally in Paris. The same day, the Representative Council of French Jewish Institutions organized a pro-Israel rally. This resulted in President Emmanuel Macron urging citizens to refrain from bringing the conflict home.

On 14 October, French-Algerian journalist Taha Bouhafs was arrested while covering a pro-Palestine protest in Paris. He told +972 Magazine that people were getting "strangled by the police", and that the police fined him for participating in an "illegal demonstration" despite showing his press card. He also claimed that the police threatened to break his legs if they saw him again at a protest.

On 22 October, France held its first authorized pro-Palestine rally, drawing 15,000 participants who chanted, "Gaza, Paris is with you."

On 12 November, over 100,000 people marched against antisemitism in Paris. Prime Minister Élisabeth Borne, the heads of France's upper and lower houses of parliament, former presidents François Hollande and Nicolas Sarkozy, and several leading politicians joined the demonstrators. However, the presence of the far-right National Rally leader Marine Le Pen, whose party has had a history of antisemitism, caused criticism from some participants such as Borne, who is the daughter of Holocaust survivors. On 21 January 2024, Paris police stopped and dispersed an automobile parade waving Palestinian flags. On 22 January, MP Louis Boyard was verbally assaulted and threatened by a pro-Israeli activist. A mass demonstration occurred in Marseille in support of Palestine on 18 February.

=== Germany ===
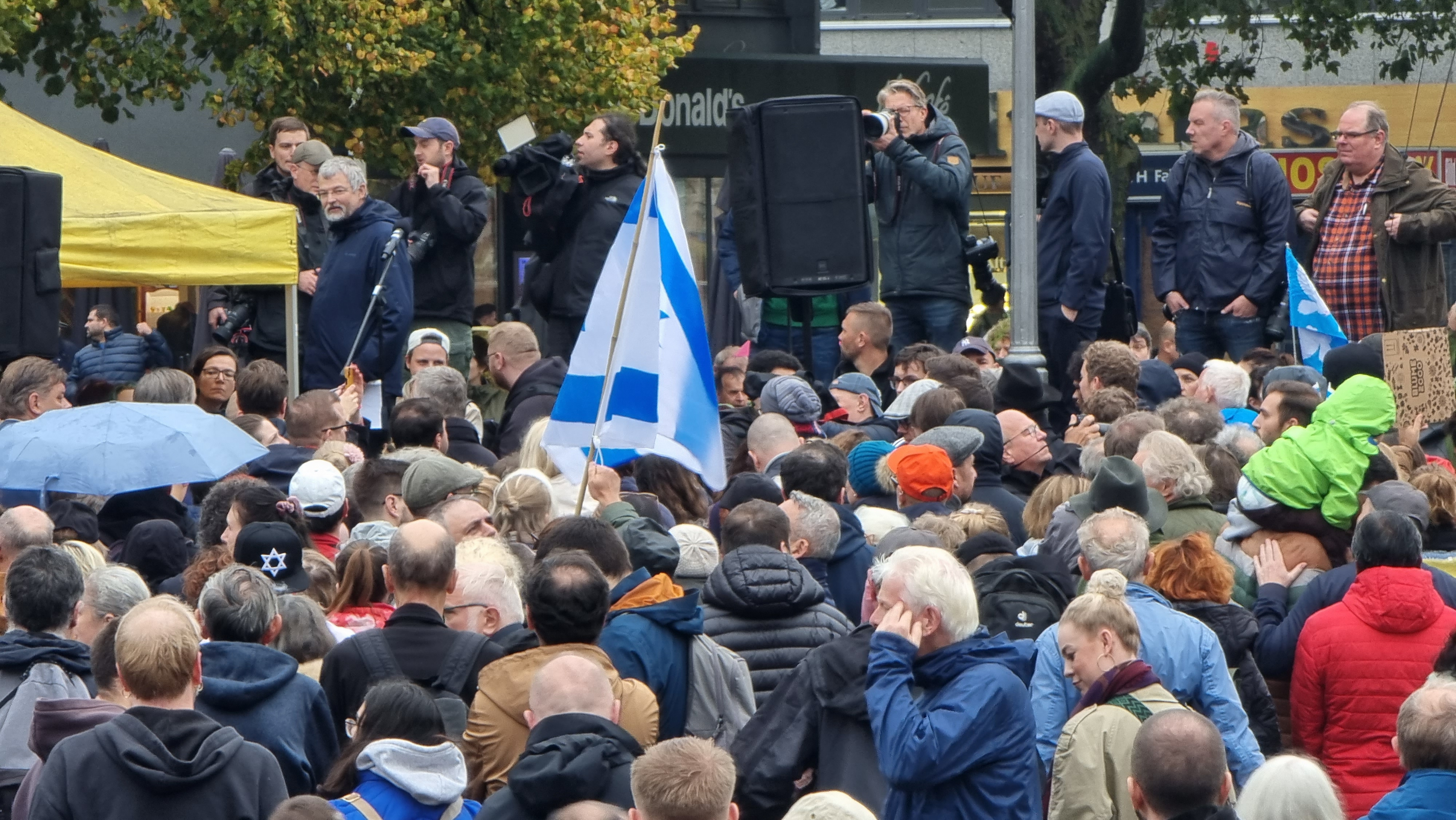
Pro-Israel protest in Hanover, 10 October

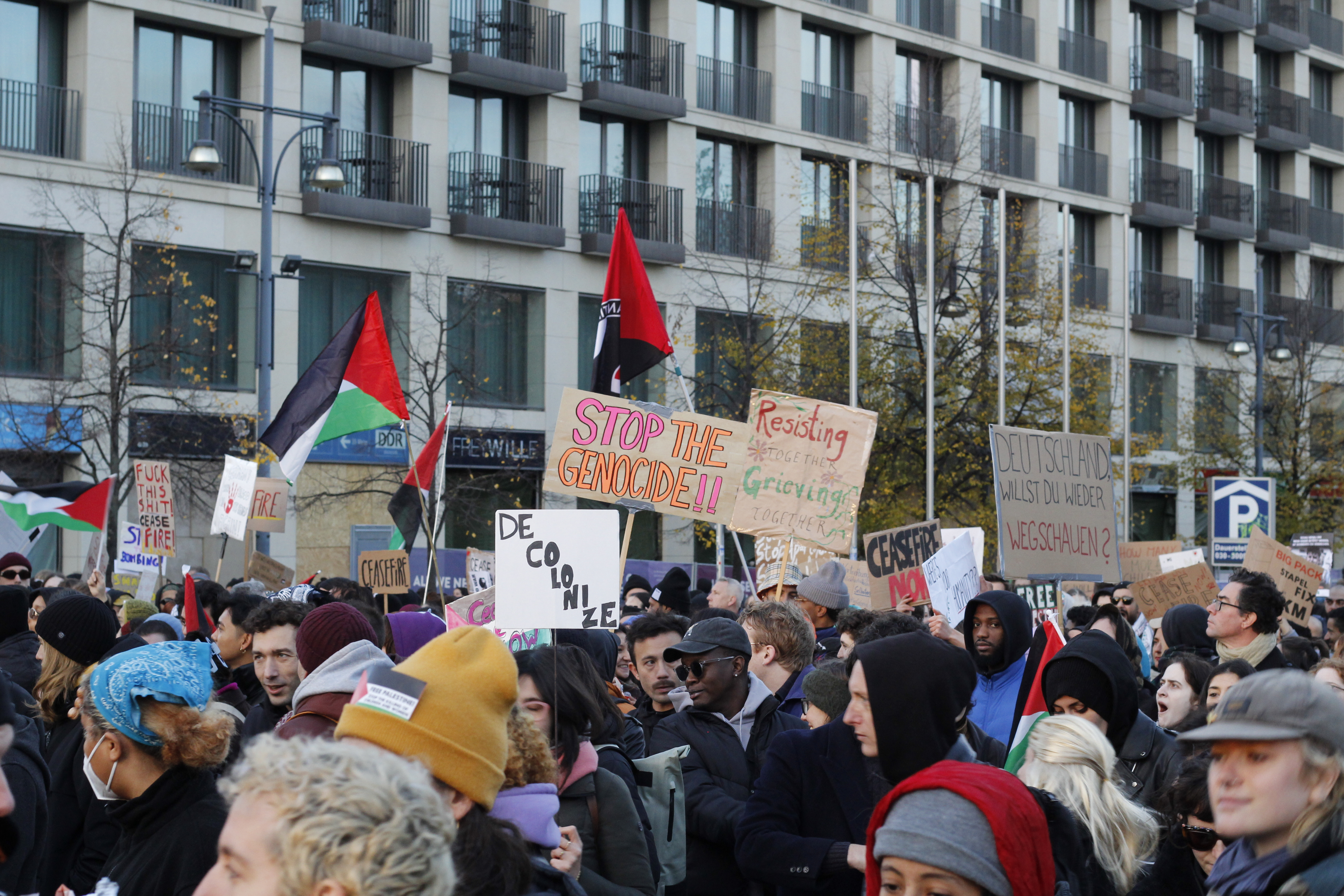
Pro-Palestine protest in Berlin, 4 November

In Berlin, authorities banned a pro-Palestinian rally from being held. A number of spontaneous demonstrations protesting the bombing of Gaza took place across the country, but were forcefully broken up by police. Germany banned fundraising, the displaying of the Palestinian flag and the wearing of the keffiyeh.

On 22 October, a pro-Israel rally was held in Berlin at the Brandenburg Gate. President Frank-Walter Steinmeier was present at the demonstration, as well as representatives from the German-Israeli Society, most mainstream political parties, the Council of the Protestant Church in Germany, the German Bishops' Conference, the Central Council of Jews in Germany, the Federation of German Industries, the German Trade Union Confederation and the Israeli ambassador Ron Prosor. On 24 February, protesters in Berlin carried a sign reading, "Stop the Genocide". In Neukölln, a neighborhood of Berlin, pro-Palestinian protesters described police crackdowns on protest that were "shocking and violent".

=== Greece ===
On 12 October 2023, 200 demonstrators gathered at Syntagma Square in Athens to show solidarity with Palestine. A day later, 2,000 protestors including Palestinians, members of Muslim communities, left-wing and anarchist groups marched towards the Israeli embassy. On 29 October, a crowd of 5,000 demonstrated in Athens, calling for an end to the "Gaza massacre." On 28 March 2024, pro-Palestinian protesters blocked a tank while in a military parade for Greece's Independence Day in Athens.

=== Ireland ===
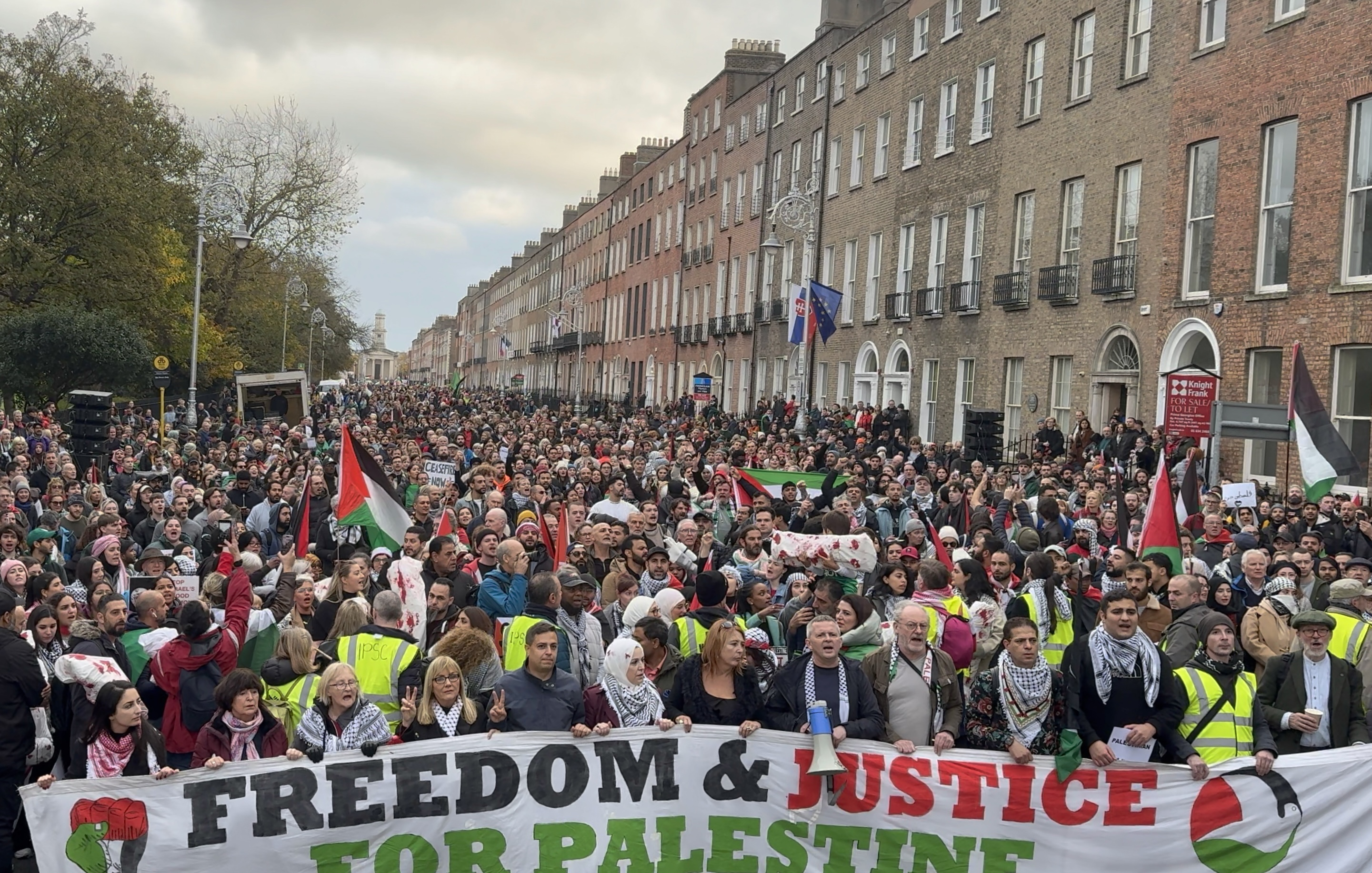
Pro-Palestine protest in Dublin, Ireland, 18 November

Thousands of people marched in cities and towns across Ireland, including Carlow, Cork, Dublin, Ennis, Galway and Limerick in support of Palestine and against Israel's attacks on Gaza and the continuing occupation of Palestine. Residents of Ballina, the ancestral hometown of US president Joe Biden, splashed red paint and wrote "Genocide Joe" over a mural of the president's face.

=== Italy ===
Thousands of pro-Palestinian demonstrators marched in Rome, carrying a large Palestinian flag and chanting slogans in support of Palestine. On 17 November, a long Palestinian flag was hung from the Leaning Tower of Pisa during a pro-Palestinian protest in the city. On 27 January 2024, In Milan, police clashed with pro-Palestinian protesters despite an official ban on protests on International Holocaust Remembrance Day.

On 22 September 2025, a nationwide protest was carried out in Italy where tens of thousands took part in the main cities of the country, demanding the government to recognize Palestinian statehood and condemn "the genocide in Gaza". Strikes and blockades were performed as ports were blocked.

Following the interception by Israeli authorities of the Global Sumud Flotilla on October 2, a general strike was called in Italy, with thousands protesting in Rome, Milan, Turin, Genoa, Naples, Bologna and Pisa, and blocked roads and trains.

=== Latvia ===
A pro-Palestine procession planned on 6 January 2024 by the "For a Free Palestine" movement was prohibited by the Riga City Council due to a perceived potential threat to public safety.

=== Luxembourg ===
On 13 January 2024, as a part of the "global day of action", protestors gathered in front of the US embassy in Luxembourg City to demand an end to the Israeli war in Gaza and a permanent ceasefire.

=== Netherlands ===
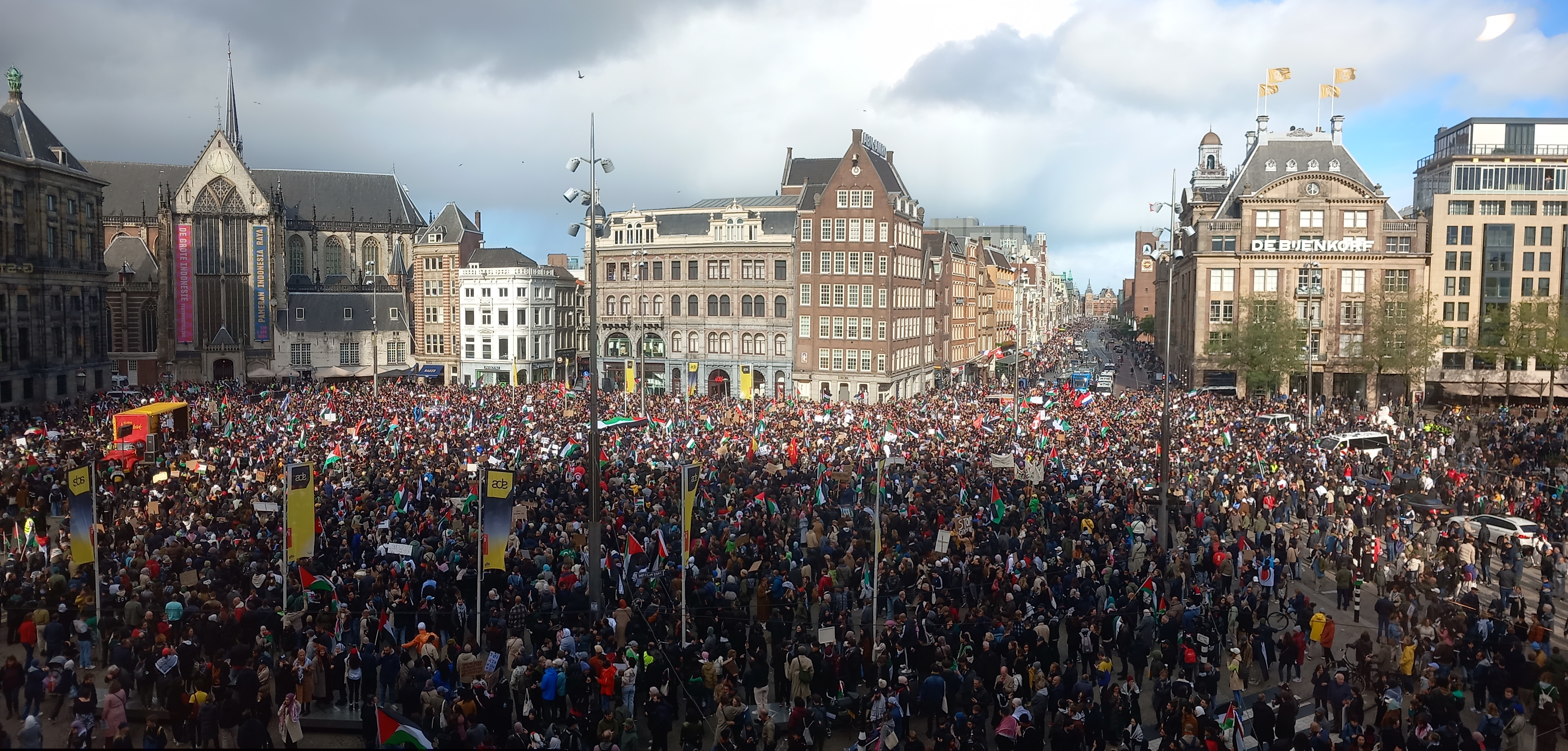
Anti-war demonstrations with Palestinian flags in Amsterdam, the Netherlands

A group of students rallied in The Hague on 13 October to show solidarity with Palestine, followed by a 15,000-strong pro-Palestinian protest in Amsterdam on 15 October. On 23 October, activists opposed to Israel's actions in Gaza occupied the entrance to the International Criminal Court in The Hague, demanding action against Benjamin Netanyahu for alleged war crimes. On 21 December, civil servants demanded a truce. In January 2024, a billboard campaign displayed messages regarding the war, including, "Every ten minutes one Palestinian child dies." On 13 January 2024, A protest organised by Plant een Olijfboom (Plant an Olive Tree) foundation was held in Amsterdam, honoring the children of Gaza by placing around 10,000 pairs of children's shoes in Dam Square, representing one Palestinian child killed by Israeli air strikes.

On 12 January 2024, hundreds of pro-Israel protesters carrying Dutch and Israeli flags gathered outside the International Court of Justice. Hundreds of Palestinian supporters also gathered to watch the genocide hearings on a large screen less than a hundred metres away from the pro-Israel group. A healthcare workers collective protested against Gaza's healthcare collapse with five demands: an end to Israel's bombing of hospitals; an end to the killing of healthcare workers; end of arms sales to Israel; the release of abducted healthcare workers; and immediate access to medical supplies. During a visit by Isaac Herzog to the National Holocaust Museum in Amsterdam, Amnesty International posted detour signs around the museum directing Herzog to The Hague.

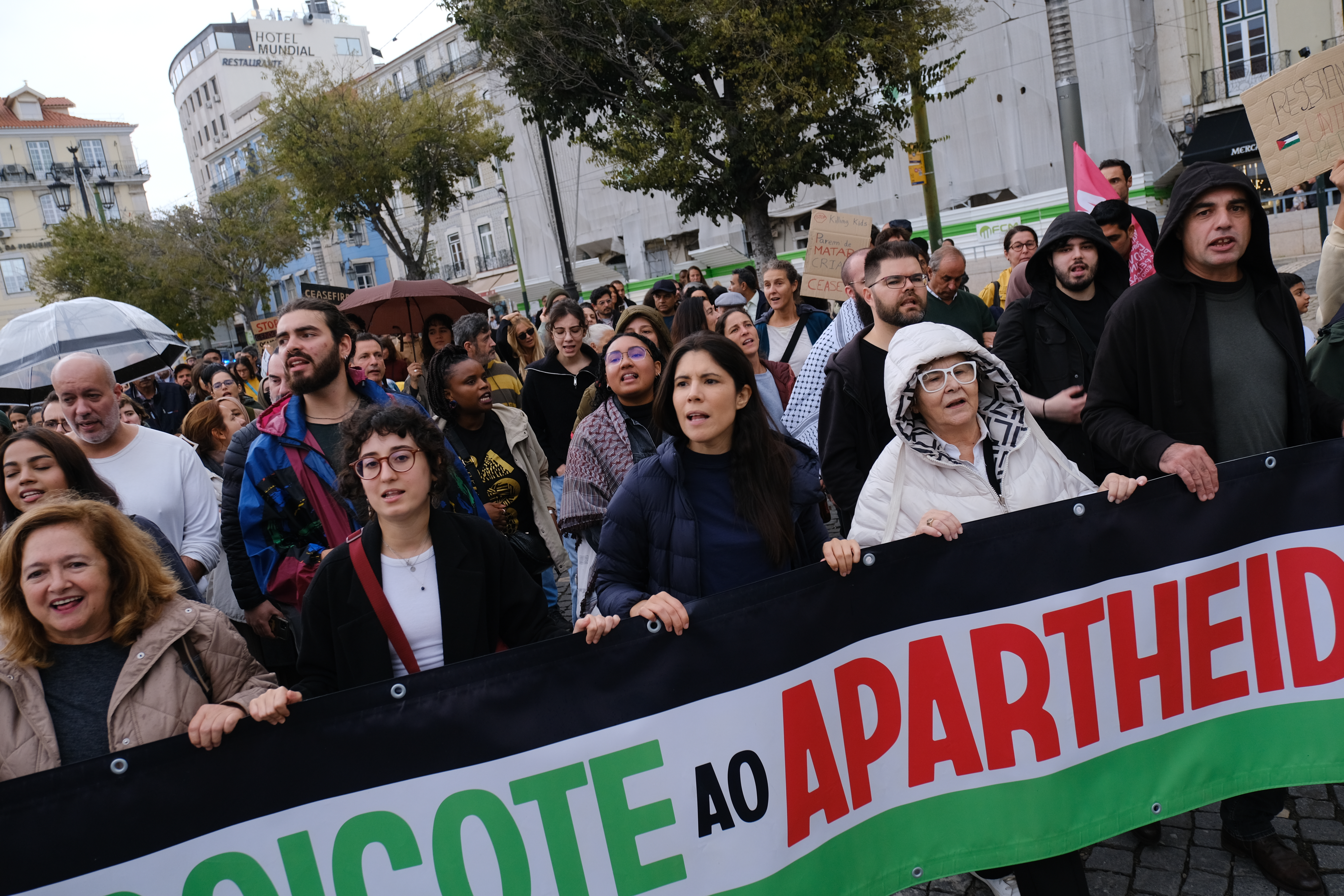
Pro-Palestine protest in Lisbon, Portugal, 29 October

On 17 March 2024 people lined up thousands of shoes dedicated to the 13,000 children that lost their lives because of the war in a public square in Utrecht.

=== Poland ===
On 23 January 2024, one person protested against the alleged Israeli genocide of Palestinians at the Israeli embassy in Warsaw.

=== Portugal ===
On 29 October 2024, a pro-Palestine protest was held in Lisbon.

=== Romania ===
On 12 October, a pro-Israel rally was organised in Bucharest by the Romanian Jewish community and the Israeli Embassy. It was attended by more than 600 people, including Health Minister Alexandru Rafila, former Defence Minister Vasile Dîncu, and opposition leader George Simion.

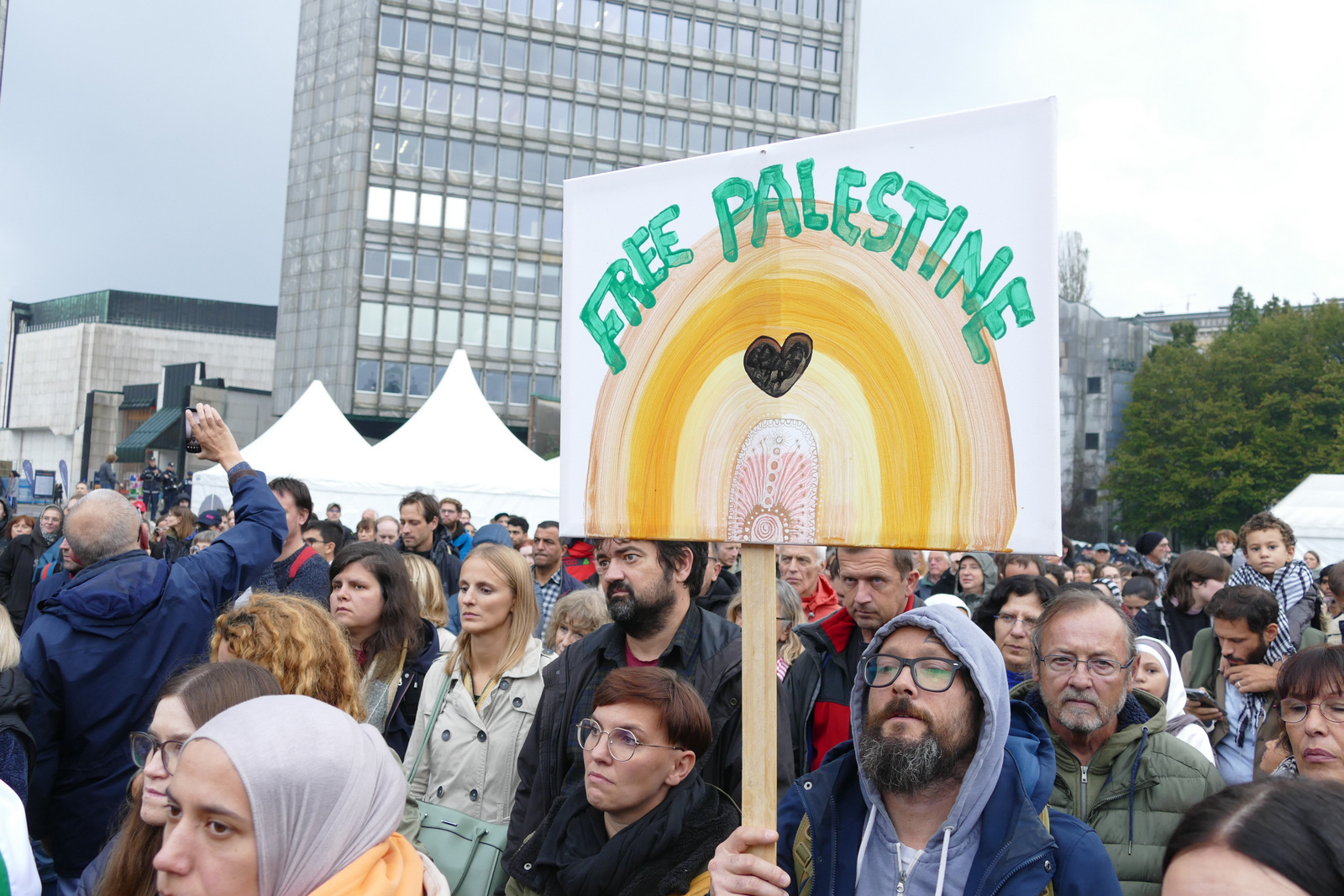
Pro-Palestine protest in Ljubljana, Slovenia, 13 October

On 21 October, a pro-Palestine rally was held in Bucharest and attended by over 1,000 demonstrators, including Twitch streamer and left-wing activist Silviu Istrate.

=== Slovenia ===
On 13 October, pro-Palestinian protests were organised in Ljubljana.

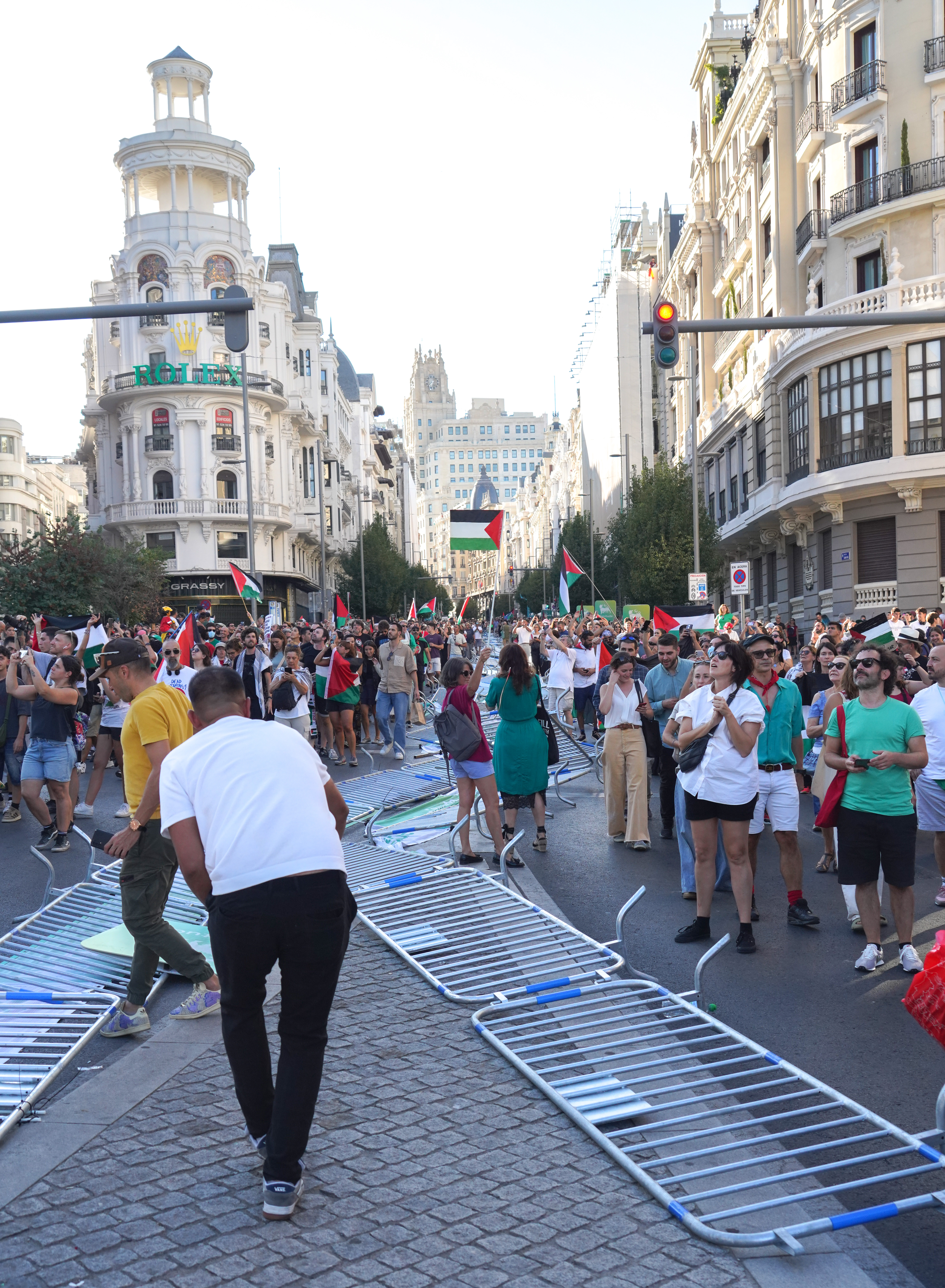
The final stage of the 2025 Vuelta a España in Madrid was disrupted by thousands of pro-Palestinian demonstrators following the inclusion of the Israel-Premier Tech team in the event.

=== Spain ===
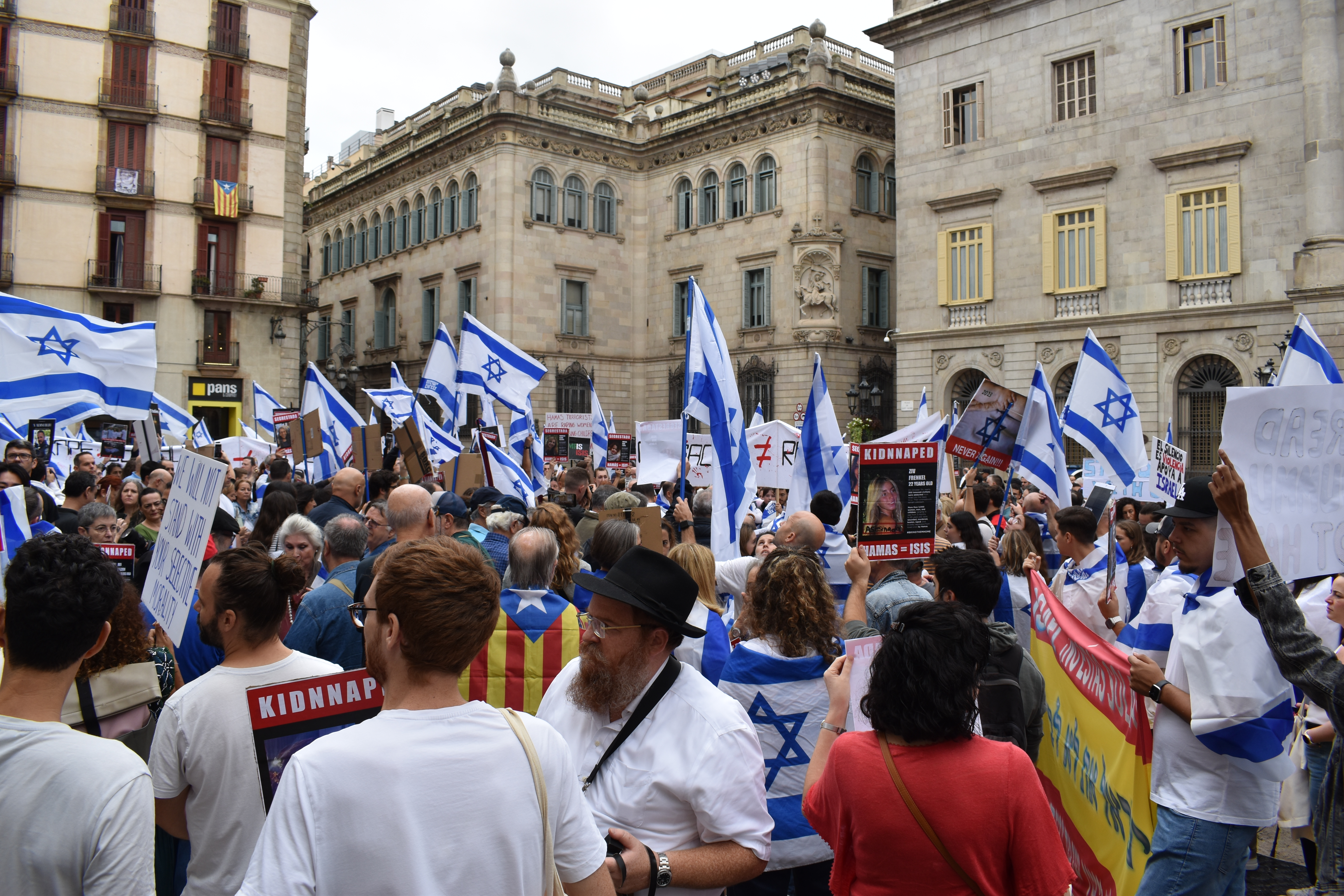
Pro-Israel protest in Barcelona, 15 October 2024

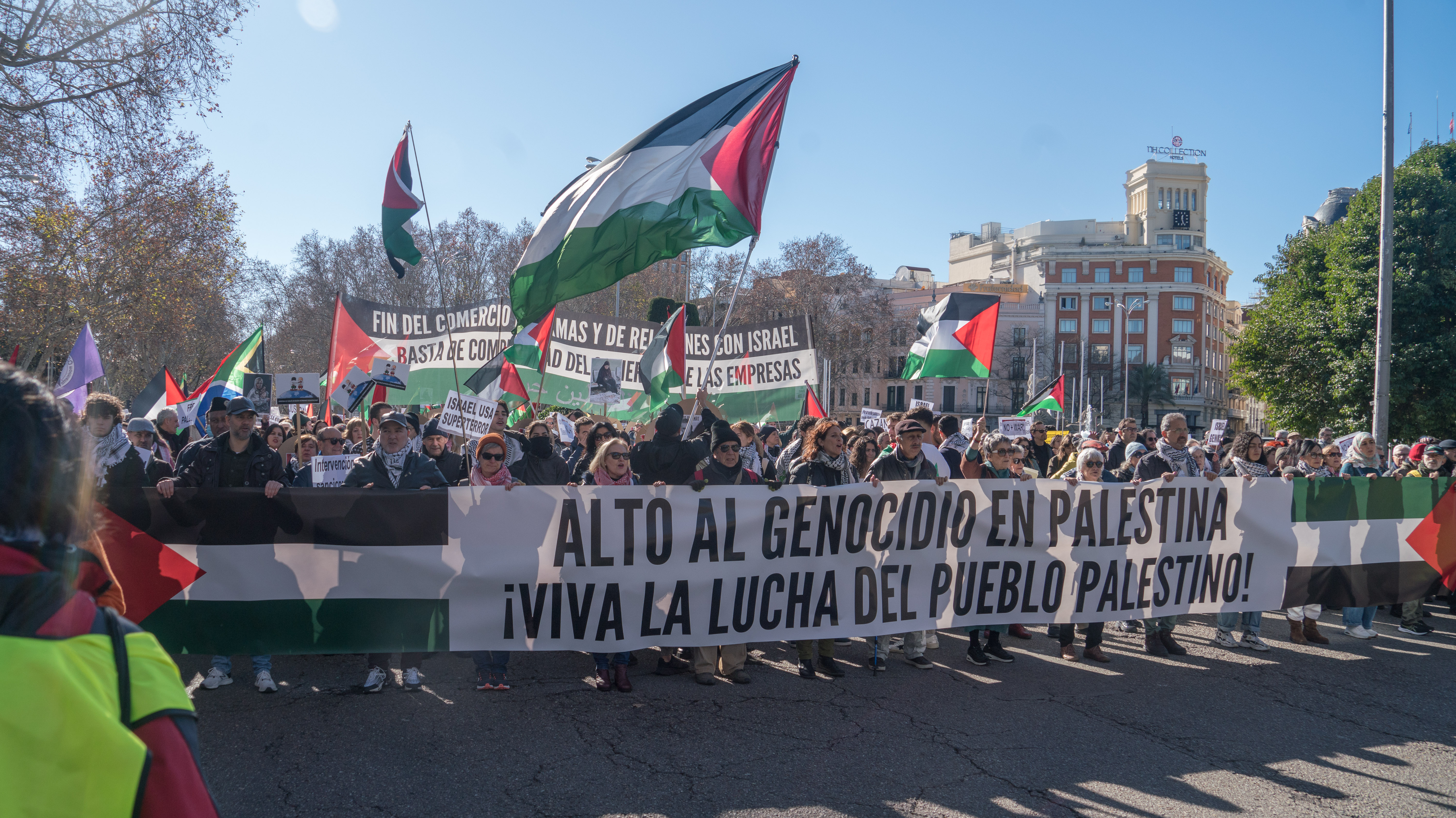
Pro-Palestine protest in Madrid, 20 January 2024

On 9 October, pro-Palestinian demonstrators gathered in the Puerta del Sol in Madrid. On 13 October, protestors rallied at the Columbus Monument in Barcelona. On 8 December, over 3000 pro-Palestine protesters in Guernica formed a massive mosaic with a human chain depicting the Palestinian flag to express their solidarity. On 27 January 2024, an estimated 20,000 marched in support of Palestine in Madrid. At least six cabinet ministers joined a march for a ceasefire in Madrid.

In September 2025, during La Vuelta a España cycling race, several stages of the race were affected by pro-Palestinian protests regarding the Gaza war and the inclusion of Israel–Premier Tech team, with multiple stages finishing prematurely, two without a stage winner. The final stage to Madrid, in particular, was cancelled upon reaching the circuit after thousands of protesters invaded the road and knocked down the barriers. The final podium ceremony was also cancelled as a result.

=== Sweden ===
As of November 2023, numerous demonstrations have been held since the war began, both pro-Palestinian and pro-Israeli.

On 7 January 2024, protesters demonstrated against the war outside the US Embassy in Stockholm. On 28 January, pro-Palestinian protests were held in Helsingborg, Malmö, and Gothenburg. On 29 February, Swedish MEP Abir Al-Sahlani used her allotted speaking time during the parliamentary session to stage a silent protest.

=== Student protests ===
Many European universities have seen protests in their campus, with police being forced to intervene in some of them.

On 25 April, students from Sorbonne University called on the French government to help Palestinians. In the Netherlands, Police clashed with pro-Palestinian students as thousands marched in Amsterdam a day after riot police violently broke up an encampment at Amsterdam University. The UvA had to cancel classes for two days following violent clashes going on between the students and the police.

In Germany, police broke up a protest by pro-Palestinian students who had occupied Berlin's Free University, an intervention supported by Berlin Mayor Kai Wegner, while in Munich there is an ongoing conflict between the town council and students camped at LMU Munich.

In Finland, students set up camp outside the main building at the University of Helsinki and in Denmark they set up a pro-Palestinian encampment at the University of Copenhagen.

In Italy, students at the University of Bologna, one of the world's oldest universities, set up a tent encampment, as the same happened in Rome and Naples.

In Spain, student protests have arosen on the University of Valencia campus, the University of Barcelona and the University of the Basque Country, while students from the Complutense University of Madrid and the Autonomous University of Madrid, have announced they would step up protests in collaboration with the rest of Madrid public universities in the coming days. The governing body of the Spanish universities (CRUE) announced on 9 May that they would "review and, if necessary, suspend" collaboration agreement with universities and research centers from Israel not committed to international humanitarian laws, as well as expressing solidarity with those students in protest.

In Ireland, following five days of protests, the Trinity College of Dublin agreed to cut ties with Israeli companies.

== See also ==
- Gaza war
