= Kyriacos Kouros =

Cypriot diplomat

Kyriacοs P. Kouros was the head of the Cyprus Intelligence Service from 2015 to 2023, and is now serving as the ambassador for Cyprus to the UK.

== Career ==
Kouros previously worked as a journalist.

He was Cyprus's Ambassador to Lebanon in 2009. Kouros served as Cyprus' Ambassador to the Netherlands in June 2012. He has also served as Cyprus' permanent representative to the Organisation for the Prohibition of Chemical Weapons.

Kouros became chief of the Cyprus Intelligence Service in 2015, following the resignation of Andreas Pentaras. He presides over the Councils of Geopolitical Affairs and Energy Politics.

Kouos has been serving as ambassador for Cyprus to the UK since April 2, 2024.
