= Cypriot Intelligence Service =

Intelligence and security agency in Cyprus

- Κυπριακή Υπηρεσία Πληροφοριών
- Logo of the Cypriot Intelligence Service

Agency overview
- Formed: 1970; 56 years ago as the Central Intelligence Service
- Jurisdiction: Republic of Cyprus
- Headquarters: Nicosia, Cyprus
- Employees: Classified
- Annual budget: Classified
- Agency executives: Tasos Tzionis, Chief of the Cypriot Intelligence Service; Panikos Stavrou, Deputy Chief of the Cypriot Intelligence Service

Footnotes
- Made in 1970, only given legal stature in 2016

The Cypriot Intelligence Service (Greek: Κυπριακή Υπηρεσία Πληροφοριών) romanized: Kypriakí Ypiresía Pliroforión, IPA: [cipri.aˈci i.pi.reˈsi.a pli.ro.foˈrion]), abbreviated as CIS (Greek: KYP, IPA: [KIP]) is the national civilian intelligence and security agency of Republic of Cyprus. It was reorganised and given official status by a parliamentary bill of 14 April 2016. The CIS was founded in 1970 by President Archbishop Makarios.

The new Independent Authority was renamed "Cypriot Intelligence Service" from "Central Intelligence Service" and is responsible for analysis and development of intelligence collection and counterintelligence systems to create national security, civilian intelligence cybersecurity, clandestine and covert operations, counterintelligence, counterterrorism, creation a civilian security network intelligence, cyberwarfare, executive protection (especially the President of the Republic of Cyprus), intelligence gathering domestic and international, internal security, political warfare, protects classified informations, support irregular warfare operations, and threat assessment to national security. (i.e. a Cypriot combination of Security Service (MI5) and Secret Intelligence Service (MI6)).

Since 4 May 2016, the Cyprus President Nicos Anastasiades has been expected to appoint (Presidential proposal appointment by Council of Ministers) the director of the new CIS and the two sub-commanders under the new legislation (Article 7). The new law, N. 75(I) of 2016, was published in the official journal on 4 May 2016 and entered into force immediately. No appointments have been made to implement the new law. The decision was taken to continue with the old structure of the service until the necessary regulations required by the new law are enacted and also the prospect of a solution of the Cyprus Problem played a role for this decision.

Before the entry into force of the new law and to this day, the political director has been Ambassador Kyriakos Kouros and the director Marios Christofides, who is a senior police officer. The rest of the members are either police officers or members of the Cyprus National Guard placed in the CIS Headquarters in Ayios Andreas, Nicosia.

Under the new law, the CIS will be able to have its own employees either as permanent members of the intelligence services or under contract and even be able to buy services from the private sector. Its budget will be confidential and under the control of the new director.

The new CIS Law contains 35 Articles and enacts the Cypriot Intelligence Service as an independent authority accountable to the President of the Republic, currently Nikolaos Chrysanthou Anastasiades (2013-2018), and the Council of Ministers.

The current head of KYP is Tasos Tzionis, who replaced Kyriacos Kouros on June 1, 2023, with the deputy chief being Panikos Stavrou.

The head of the Intelligence Service will also serve as an advisor to the National Security Council (And also co-ordinator), which was formed in 2023.

== Operational history ==
=== UN documents leak ===
The Cypriot Intelligence Service is believed to be responsible for one of the largest intelligence thefts in United Nations (UN) history, having stolen over 6,500 documents containing classified information on the UN's negotiations with the Turkish and Turkish-Cypriot leaders. A Greek-Cypriot intelligence officer reportedly befriended Sonja Bachmann, a senior aide of Alexander Downer (who was Australian Foreign Minister and, at the time, a senior UN adviser to the Secretary-General Ban Ki-moon). The operation is believed to have begun around 10 September 2009, when the second round of talks was to begin. The leaked documents were originally sent to Phileleftheros under the guise that they originated from New York to throw off investigators (later determined to have originated from somewhere in Nicosia). To gain the information, KYP used hackers to steal Buchmann's e-mail passwords, and then using those credentials while she was not at her hotel, officers accessed her e-mails and downloaded all her files.

Some of the leaked files include:

- A meeting between Alexander Downer and Ahmet Davutoğlu (then Foreign Minister of Turkey)
- A meeting between Downer and Mehmet Ali Talat (Turkish-Cypriot leader)
- A meeting in New York between Lynn Pascoe (then Under-Secretary-General of the United Nations for the United Nations Department of Political and Peacebuilding Affairs) and Frank Urbancic (then US ambassador to Cyprus)
- A document that divided members of the Holy Synod of Cyprus on their views of the Annan plan

=== 2012 Cyprus terror plot ===
In 2012, Cypriot Intelligence began surveilling a Swedish-Lebanese citizen by the name of Hossam Yaakoub, who was a member of the Hezbollah terrorist organisation, whilst he was also surveilling Israeli tourists coming into Larnaca International Airport and planning a major terrorist attack (which was later discovered to involve approximately 8.5 tonnes of ammonium nitrate explosive). His house was later raided by Cyprus Police who arrested him and discovered the explosives.

=== Surveillance of Espen Barth Eide ===
Whilst Espen Barth Eide was serving as the Special Adviser for Cyprus, KYP believed that Espen was a national security threat who was working to undermine the Cypriot government and, as a result, was placed under surveillance.

Before Eide was due to leave Cyprus, he arranged secret meeting with Andros Kyprianou, then leader of the communist party of Cyprus, which was arranged via SMS by Kyprianou's personal secretary and Mr. Eide in secret. However, KYP had tapped Eide's phone and were alerted to the meeting and had set up surveillance outside the headquarters of AKEL (Cypriot communist party), where the meeting was to take place.

A few days later, Fileleftheros published an article stating that the head of a political party was engaging in secret meetings with Eide and, as result, Mr. Kyprianou confronted President Anastasiades to which the President reportedly said, "I know you may also meet with Mr. Eida, either at the party office or elsewhere" and also reportedly said to him "It is possible that the one who you meet is being watched".

When the press published the information about the meeting, KYP Director Kyriakos Kouros contacted Kyprianou directly and assured him that he (Kyprianou) himself was not under surveillance but that Eide was perceived as a national security threat.

=== 2023 June terror plot ===
In late June 2023, it was reported by Cypriot media that the Cypriot Intelligence Service, in coordination with the Israel Mossad and the United States Central Intelligence Agency (CIA), foiled a series of terrorist attacks on Cypriot soil which would have allegedly been executed on behalf of the Iranian Islamic Revolutionary Guard Corps (IRGC).

The cell which was to execute the attack had been operating out of the occupied north of the island assuming authorities would be unable to surveil them due to the ongoing conflict between Cyprus and Turkey. However, this was not the case as there had been a surveillance operation in place on both sides of the ceasefire line.

The would-be attackers were surveilling targets, especially in the Limassol district and other areas of Israeli interest.

The Cypriot authorities managed to secure the equipment that would have been used. However, the main suspect had fled from the Turkish-occupied north but was later arrested by Mossad.

The Prime Minister of Israel, Benjamin Netanyahu, thanked the Cypriot authorities for foiling the attack.

=== Russian spy apprehension ===
In October 2023, after receiving intelligence from the CIA, the Cypriot Ministry of Foreign Affairs revoked the visa of Russian journalist Alexander Gasyuk, who worked at the state-run Rossiyskaya Gazeta, for allegedly surveilling and conducting espionage on targets in Nicosia, with Nicosia's official reason citing national security concerns. As a result, Cypriot Intelligence followed and later apprehended the suspect who initially resisted arrest and was injured during the attempt. Although he was later deported, Russia demanded that Cyprus apologize for the incident and the spokeswoman of the Russian Ministry of Foreign Affairs Maria Zakharova, called it a provocation and a co-ordinated campaign from the West.

=== Hybrid attack investigation ===
A video surfaced on 8 January 2026, one day after the ceremony where Cyprus took over the Presidency of the EU council, accusing the government of corruption. Cyprus Intelligence Service had determined that the video was a product aimed at the government as a form of hybrid warfare. However, the Cypriot Communist Party and MPs such as Alexandra Attalides criticised the government, even though according to KYP, the Police and Fact Check Cyprus had all confirmed the nefarious and dubious nature during the preliminary investigations.
