= National Security Council (Cyprus) =

Body of the Cypriot government

Agency overview
- Formed: March 30, 2023 (Introduced); May 31, 2023 (Officially created)
- Headquarters: Presidential Palace
- Agency executives: President Nikos Christodoulides, Chairman; Tasos A. Tzionis, National Security Advisor
- Parent agency: Presidency of the Republic of Cyprus

The National Security Council (Greek: Συμβούλιο Εθνικής Ασφαλείας) is a body of the Cypriot government which was created by President Christodoulides in 2023 in order for state services coordinate with each other and the executive for both national security and external affairs.

== Function ==
The functions of the National Security Council are as follows:

- To advise the President on matters pertaining to national security.
- To plan and scrutinize the national security strategy.
- Coordinate with other international counterparts.

== Composition ==
The National Security Council is composed of:

Member	Office(s)
Nikos Christodoulides	President
Constantinos Kombos	Minister of Foreign Affairs
Vasilis Palmas	Minister of Defense
Costas Fytiris	Minister of Justice and Public Order
Tasos A. Tzionis	National Security Advisor
Tasos A. Tzionis	Head of Cyprus Intelligence Service
Emmanouel Theodorou	Chief of the National Guard General Staff
Themistos Arnaoutis	Chief of Cyprus Police
