= Ireland–Israel relations =

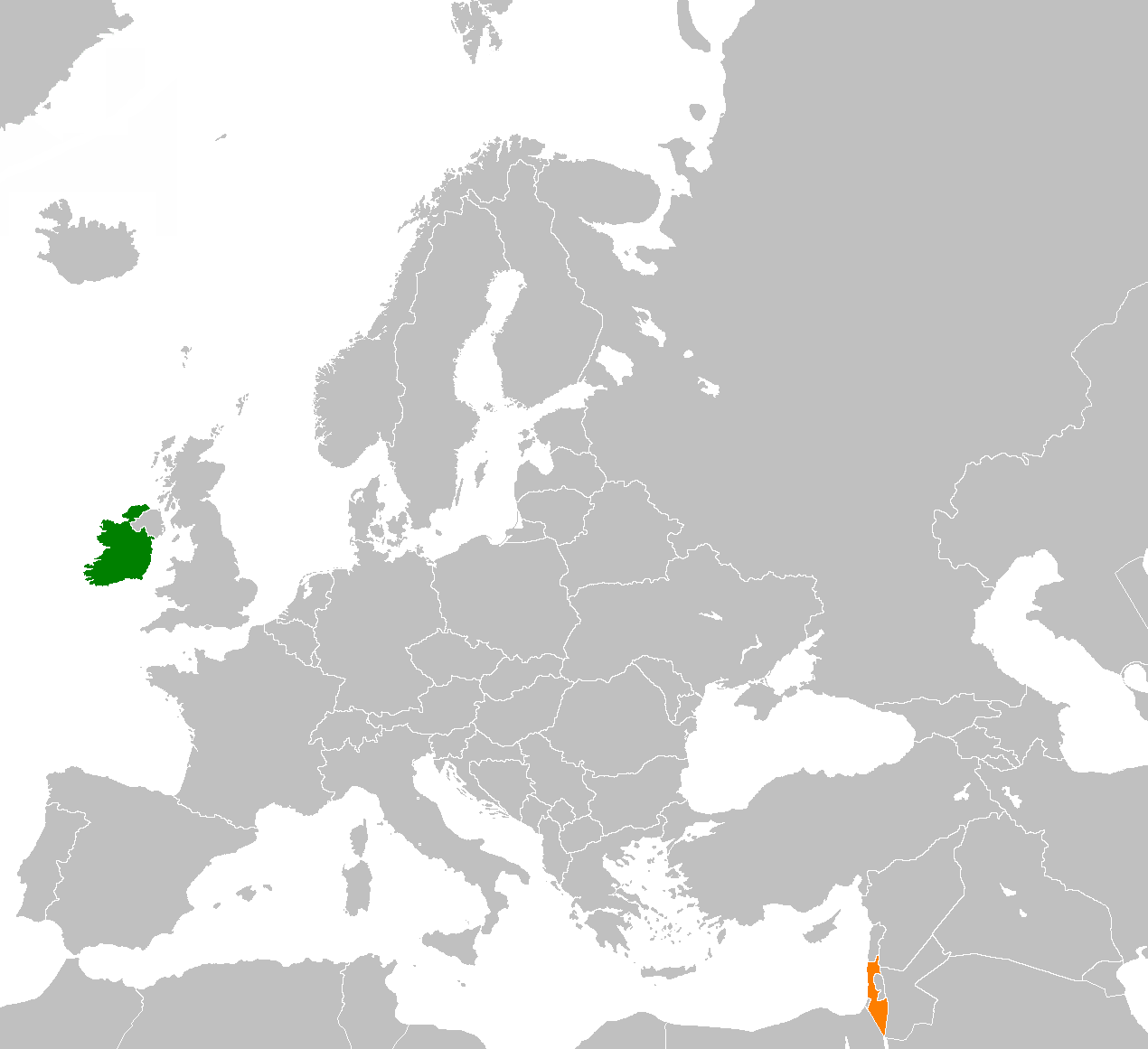

- Ireland: Israel

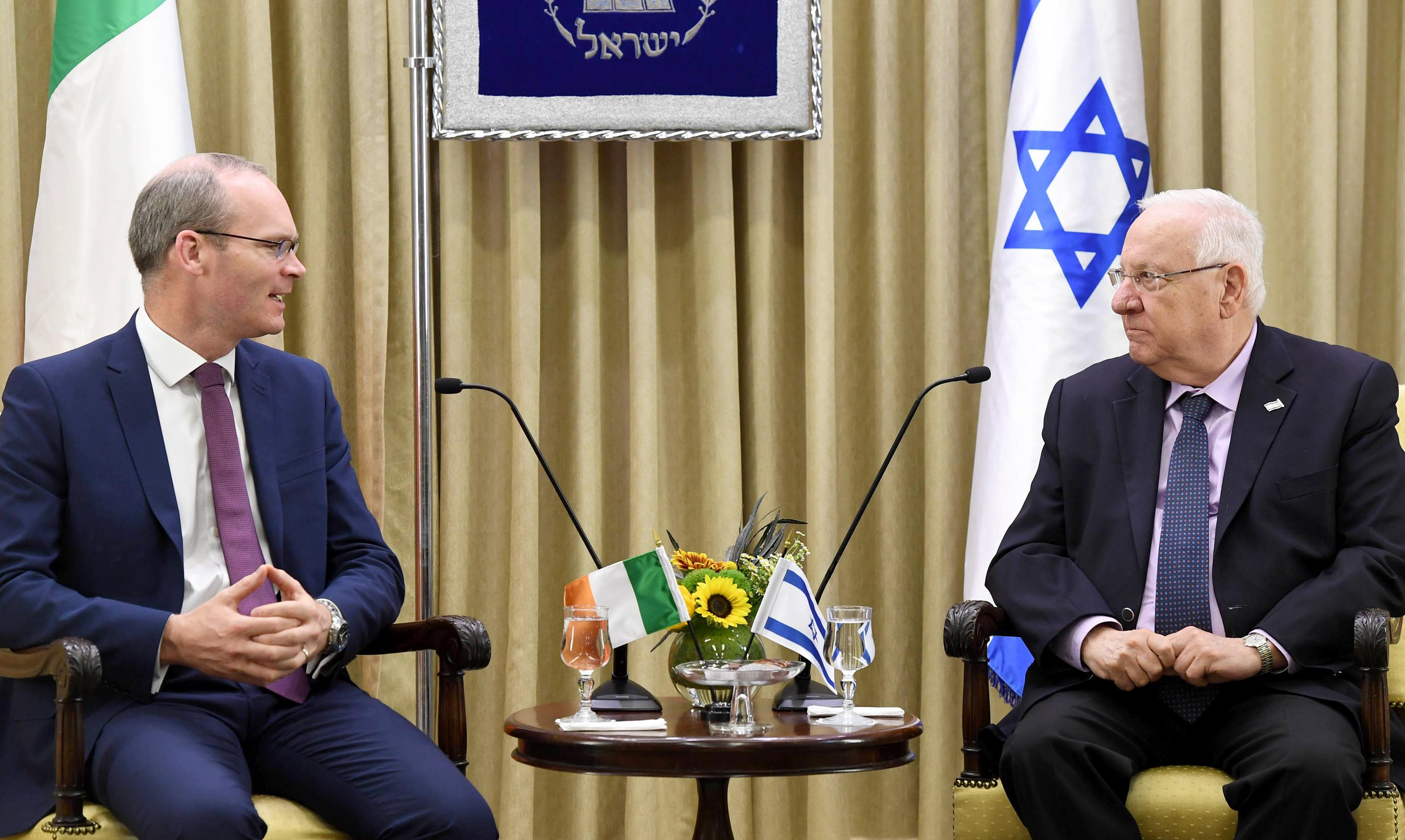
Israeli President Reuven Rivlin with Irish Foreign Minister Simon Coveney in Jerusalem, 2017

Ireland and Israel maintain foreign relations. Relations between the two countries have been complex and generally strained due to their conflicting positions on the Israeli–Palestinian conflict.

Relations deteriorated significantly during the Gaza war that began in October 2023, amid Ireland's criticism of Israel's war crimes in Gaza and the worsening humanitarian crisis in the territory. The Irish government, led by Taoiseach Simon Harris (and previously Leo Varadkar), repeatedly called for a ceasefire and increased humanitarian aid for Palestinians, and was among the most outspoken European critics of Israel's conduct during the conflict.

Diplomatic tensions intensified in 2024 when Ireland joined Spain and Norway in recognizing the State of Palestine, prompting strong criticism and diplomatic protests from Israel. In late 2024, Israel closed its embassy in Dublin, citing Ireland's "anti-Israel" stance. In January 2025, Ireland announced it would join South Africa's Gaza genocide case against Israel in the International Court of Justice.

== History ==
=== 20th century ===
During the first half of the 20th century, tactics used by the Irish Republican Army during the Irish War of Independence inspired Zionist paramilitaries engaged in the Jewish insurgency in Mandatory Palestine against British rule. Lehi leader Yitzhak Shamir, inspired by IRA leader Michael Collins, ordered every Lehi fighter to carry a weapon with them at all times. Shamir's nickname among the various Zionist paramilitaries, "Michael" (pronounced [miχaˈʔel]), derived from Collins' first name.

Against the background of growing antisemitism in interwar Europe, Ireland implemented constitutional protection of Jewish citizens under Article 44 of the 1937 Constitution of Ireland, explicitly recognising the Jewish religious community among the country's recognised denominations. On 3 May 1937, the Jewish Telegraphic Agency reported that "The Jewish religion is formally recognized in the new Free State constitution drawn up by President Éamon de Valera."

In July 1950, Éamon De Valera (while Irish leader of the opposition) went on a pilgrimage to Rome and then Jerusalem. He dined at Chief Rabbi Isaac Herzog's home alongside Israeli Prime Minister David Ben-Gurion and multiple other cabinet members of the first government of Israel.

The Éamon de Valera Forest in Israel, near Nazareth, was dedicated in 1966, with Israeli Prime Minister Levi Eshkol declaring the forest a "fitting expression of the traditional friendship between Ireland and Israel, which have so much in common."

Ireland extended de jure recognition to Israel in 1963, and both countries established diplomatic relations in 1975, when Ireland's ambassador to Switzerland was also accredited to Israel. Prior to that, Ireland had refused to establish relations due to Israel's alleged violations of UN Resolutions.

In 1978, Aer Lingus, the national airline of Ireland, without prior agreement with the Irish government, secretly trained Egyptian Air Force pilots, at a time when Israel and Egypt were still in peace talks, and had yet to sign a treaty.

In 1978, the Irish Army contributed forces to Lebanon as part of UNIFIL, a UN peacekeeping force in Southern Lebanon, which was the scene of fierce fighting between Israeli forces and their proxy militias and Lebanese guerillas. From 1978 to 2000, Ireland contributed over 40,000 troops to UNIFIL, and was the country's largest military involvement outside its own borders. Tensions erupted between the two countries over alleged mistreatment of Irish forces by the Israel Defense Forces. Irish forces were a major participant in the Battle of At Tiri, where UNIFIL troops withstood an attack by the South Lebanon Army, an Israeli-backed militia, after it attempted to set up a checkpoint in At Tiri. One Irish soldier was killed in the battle. In 1987 Corporal Dermot McLoughlin of the Irish Defence Forces was serving in Lebanon as a member of the UN peacekeeping force (UNIFIL) when he was killed after being hit by an Israeli tank shell. The Irish Army believed the incident to have been a "deliberate and unprovoked attack" by the Israeli forces, with the Irish Defence Minister Paddy O'Toole saying that he was "dismayed, disappointed and disgusted". The Israeli ambassador was summoned as a response.

Throughout the 1980s and 1990s, the Irish Government regularly called the Israelis to criticise them over their treatment of Irish peacekeepers. Irish Foreign Minister Brian Lenihan said that much of his sympathy for Israel disappeared when he saw how Irish soldiers were treated.

In 1981, Ireland condemned Israel's attack on Iraq's Osirak nuclear reactor. In 1990, Benjamin Netanyahu, who was then Israeli deputy foreign minister, visited Ireland and met with Irish foreign minister Gerry Collins, lobbying strongly for the opening of an embassy in Dublin. Collins noted the historic sympathy towards Israel in Ireland had been damaged by "cases of Irish troops being brought home dead from Lebanon". In December 1993, Ireland reached an agreement on opening an Israeli embassy in Dublin, and the embassy opened on 29 January 1996.

Since 25 January 1996, Ireland has an embassy in Tel Aviv and Israel had an embassy in Dublin until its closure in 2024. The Israeli ambassador to Ireland is Dana Erlich, who took over the role from Lironne Bar-Sadeh in August 2023, and the Irish ambassador to Israel is Sonya McGuinness. Both countries are full members of the Union for the Mediterranean.

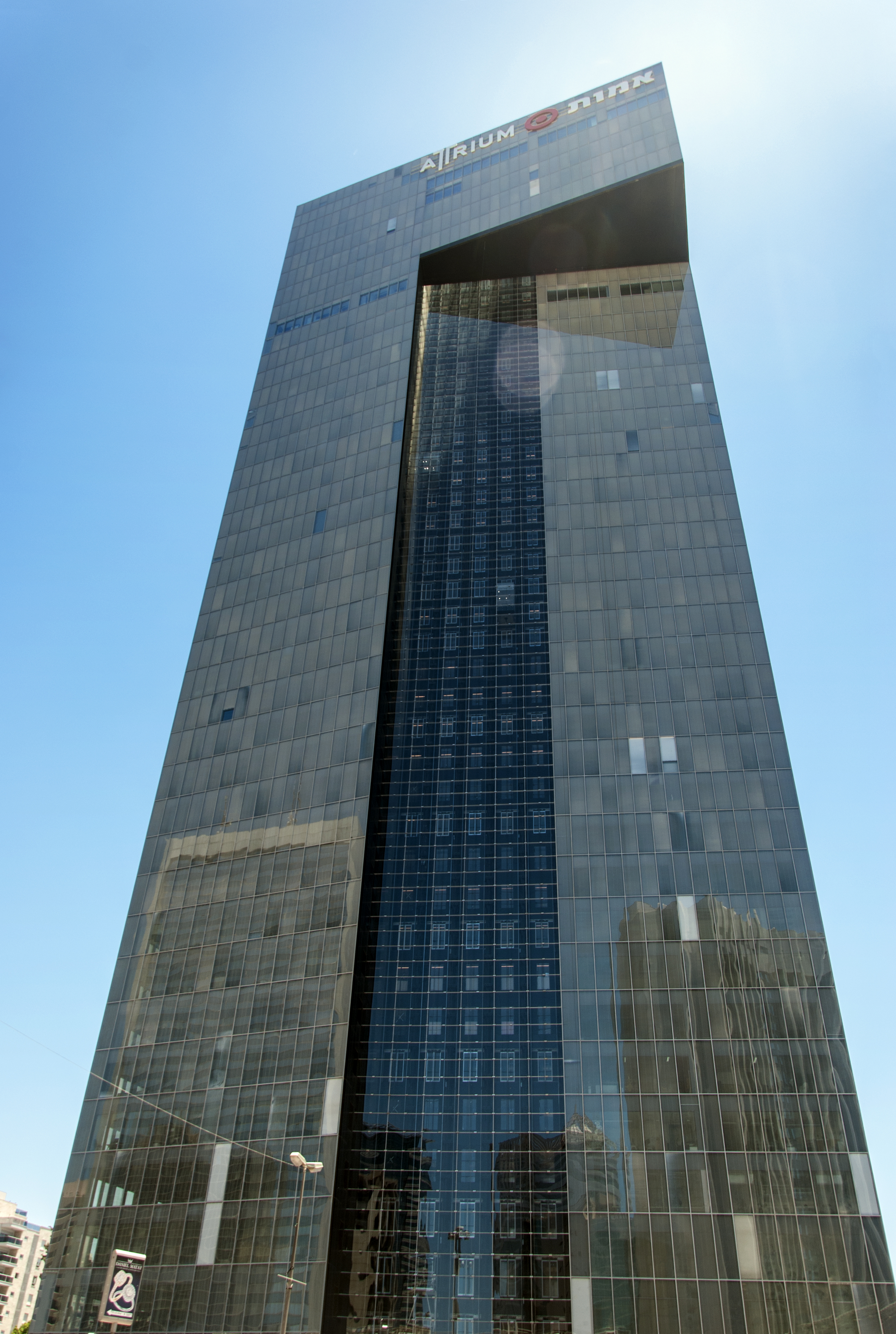
Ireland Embassy, Tel Aviv

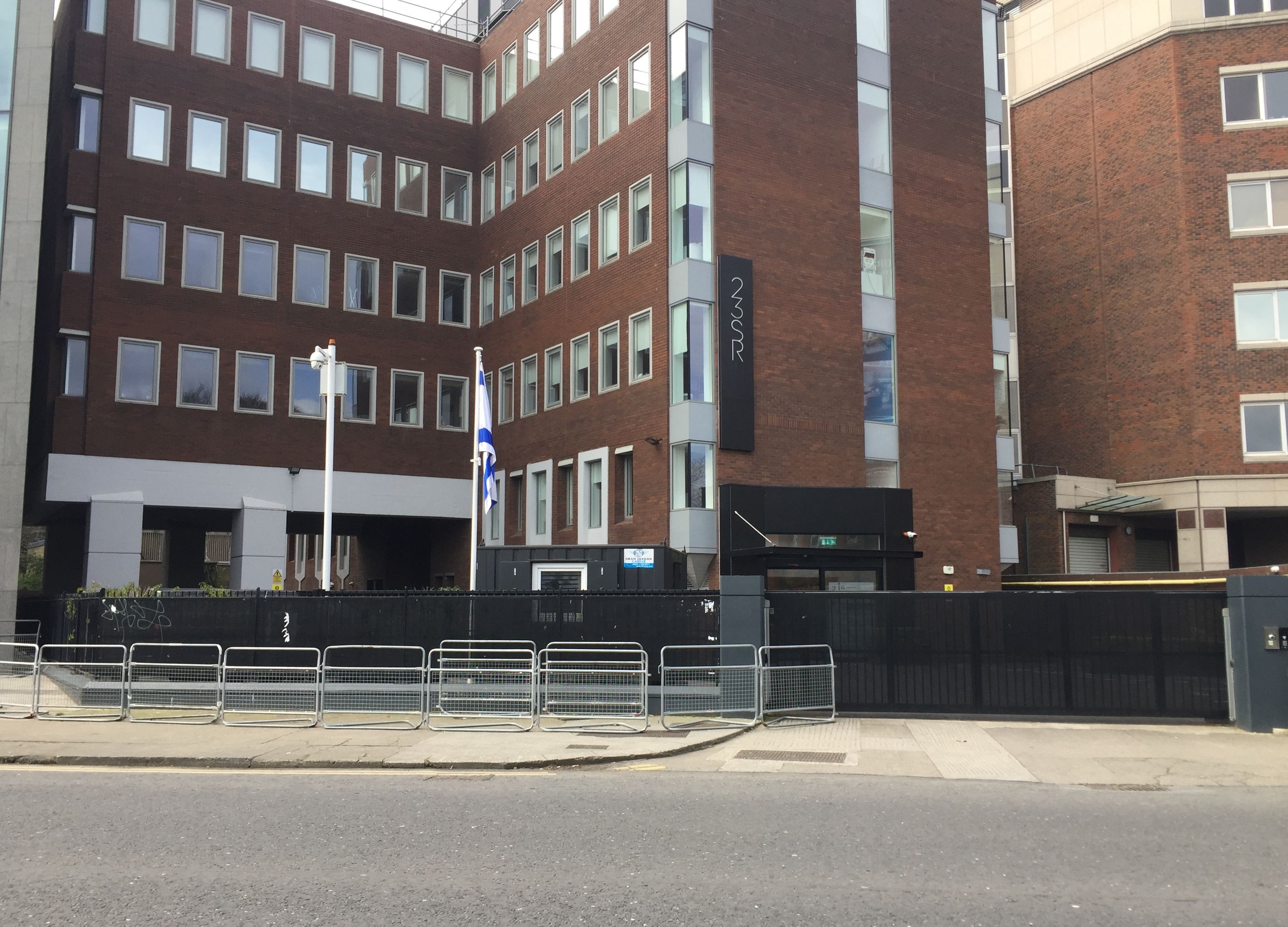
Israel Embassy, Dublin

=== 2000 to 2019 ===
In 2003, the Irish government opposed the building of Israel's security wall in the West Bank.

Following the 2006 Lebanon War, Ireland deployed a unit of 150 troops to protect Finnish Army engineers and according to leaked diplomatic cables sought to "limit US weapons transfers to Israel" through its territory and Shannon Airport.

In 2010, Boaz Moda'i was named Israel's ambassador to Ireland. In the same year an Israeli embassy official was expelled from Ireland after it emerged that the Israeli intelligence service, Mossad, had created eight fake Irish passports when they assassinated Hamas leader Mahmoud Al-Mabhouh. The Irish Minister for Foreign Affairs Micheál Martin said Israel's action were "clearly unacceptable".

In 2012, Nurit Tinari-Modai, wife of the ambassador Boaz Moda'i, was appointed deputy ambassador. Noting that the appointment would be "reviewed annually", an Israeli Foreign Ministry source stated that Tinari-Modai was a "professional diplomat" who could have "secured a full ambassadorship on her own merits".

In March 2013, Alan Shatter, minister of Justice, Equality and Defence said, while visiting Israel, that "Ireland is a friend of Israel. We have a government in Ireland that wants a deeper engagement. But we also have a government in Ireland that is committed to the peace process." During that trip, it was announced that Ireland and Israel would start an initiative to work closely together on reducing road deaths in both countries.

In May 2014, the Anti-Defamation League (ADL) published the "ADL Global 100 survey" into global anti-Semitism. The survey ranked Ireland as "in the middle in comparison with other countries in Western Europe" in terms of responses to questions on attitudes to Israel and to Jewish people.

In September 2014, Irish UN peacekeepers on the Golan Heights rescued Filipino colleagues who were surrounded by Islamist extremists. Senior sources confirmed that Irish soldiers would "almost certainly" have been killed or taken hostage if it wasn't for the military intervention of the Israeli army, and that assistance from the Israeli army was "decisive" in the success of the rescue.

In November 2015, Alison Kelly became Ireland's ambassador to Israel, replacing Eamonn McKee. Kelly presented her credentials to Israeli President Reuven Rivlin stating that her goal was to "continue to work to strengthen and expand the cooperation between our countries". Also in 2015, Zeev Boker became the Israeli ambassador to Ireland, presenting his credentials to the President of Ireland, Michael D. Higgins.

=== 2020 to present ===
In 2021, Dáil Éireann (the lower house of the Irish parliament) unanimously passed a motion condemning the "de facto annexation" of Palestinian land.

As of September 2023, Ireland's ambassador to Israel was Sonya McGuinness, and Dana Erlich was Israel's ambassador to Ireland.

In December 2024, Israel announced that it would close its embassy in Dublin due to what it described as "the extreme anti-Israel policies of the Irish government". On 20 December 2024, the Irish Department of Foreign Affairs received notification of the closure of the embassy.

In January 2025, Dana Erlich confirmed that she would remain in the role of ambassador until mid-2025 at which point Israel would appoint a non-resident ambassador.

On 24 February 2025, Irish MEP, Lynn Boylan was refused entry to Israel along with French MEP Rima Hassan and other EU officials. They had been travelling as part of an EU delegation for discussions with Palestinian authorities. They had their passports and mobile devices seized and were detained and interrogated before being deported back to Brussels. Boylan said that no official reason had been given for the deportation. In response, the Israeli government said that "foreigners who have published a public call to impose a boycott on the State of Israel...will not be authorised to enter Israel".

In May 2025, Ireland's national broadcaster, RTÉ, sought a meeting with the European Broadcasting Union to discuss Israel's inclusion in the Eurovision Song Contest. The request came in the context of "the ongoing events in the Middle East and by the horrific impact on civilians in Gaza, and the fate of Israeli hostages" and followed a call by the NUJ Dublin Broadcasting Branch to follow the lead of other European public service stations in seeking discussions on Israel's participation in the that year's event. The Israeli ambassador to Ireland, Dana Erlich, criticised the move accusing RTÉ of "showing bias against Israel". Following the contest, RTÉ followed Spanish broadcaster, RTVE, in requesting a breakdown of the vote. The Irish jury had awarded Israel seven points, and received ten points from the public vote. The Irish delegation was one of five to boycott the 2026 contest over Israel's inclusion in it.

In May 2025, Ireland's president, President Michael D Higgins said accusations of anti-Semitism against those who criticise the policies of Israeli Prime Minister Benjamin Netanyahu amount to "slander against Ireland". "If you criticise Netanyahu's policies you are then described as being anti-Semitic. That is a disgrace and a slander and it has been a slander against Ireland, against individuals, including myself, people who for example who have worked all their lives in relation to human rights activity," President Higgins said.

In November 2025, there was some controversy over a proposal by some members of Dublin City Council to rename Herzog Park in Dublin. Originally known as Orwell Quarry Park, the park was renamed in 1995 after Israeli President Chaim Herzog whose father, the former Chief Rabbi of Ireland Yitzhak HaLevi Herzog, was Irish. Herzog's grandson Isaac Herzog, the sitting president of Israel, stated that the proposed "de-naming" of the park would be a "shameful and disgraceful move". Taoiseach Micheál Martin and Táiniste Simon Harris criticised the proposed vote, with Martin describing it as "divisive and wrong".

== Commercial ties and tourism ==
The commercial relationship between Israel and Ireland goes back to the early days of Israeli statehood. In 1988, Israeli exports to Ireland were valued at $23.5 million, while Irish exports to Israel were valued at $32.8 million. In 2010 Israeli imports from Ireland approached $520 million and exports to Ireland stood at $81 million.

Israeli exports to Ireland include machinery and electronics, rubber and plastics, chemicals, textiles, optical/medical equipment, gems, and fruit and vegetables. Irish exports to Israel include machinery and electronics, chemicals, textiles, foodstuffs, beverages, and optical/medical equipment. A bilateral agreement on double taxation signed in 1995 has facilitated economic cooperation.

In August 2014 controversy erupted when it became public that Ireland had approved export licences for military goods worth up to €6.4m to be shipped to Israel over the previous three years. Opposition parties complained that the types of materials sold to Israel were being kept secret from the Irish public. While the Irish government refused to give exact details on the type of equipment, updated figures showed military licences totalling €126,637 had been approved in advance of the 2014 Gaza conflict. Sinn Féin's Pádraig Mac Lochlainn and Fianna Fáil senator Averil Power demanded more transparency over the export approvals.

According to Haaretz newspaper, Ireland was the most popular destination for Israeli holidaymakers in 2000. In 2005, a peak number of Irish nationals visited Israel to attend the Ireland-Israel World Cup qualifying match.

Israel - Ireland trade in millions USD-$
	Israel imports Ireland exports	Ireland imports Israel exports	Total trade value
2023	1870.7	3422.5	5293.2
2022	1920	2576.1	4496.1
2021	1975.7	1435.4	3411.1
2020	1216.1	198	1414.1
2019	1051.4	86.1	1137.5
2018	1179.1	104.4	1283.5
2017	868.4	68.3	936.7
2016	2066.6	83.5	2150.1
2015	1300.4	99.7	1400.1
2014	837.9	99.7	937.6
2013	935.2	154.1	1089.3
2012	1006	62.7	1068.7
2011	994.5	86.7	1081.2
2010	519.5	79.3	598.8
2009	473.1	92.4	565.5
2008	415.1	99.9	515
2007	368.1	118.9	487
2006	352.7	109.9	462.6
2005	367.4	160.2	527.6
2004	370.4	135.9	506.3
2003	252.4	85.5	337.9
2002	251.7	60.7	312.4

== Ireland and the Israeli–Palestinian conflict ==
Ireland annually provides €10 million in bilateral and multilateral aid to the Palestinian people and organisations, including €3.5 million through the United Nations Relief and Works Agency for Palestine Refugees in the Near East.

=== 2010 to 2014 ===
On 19 January 2010, Mahmoud al-Mabhouh, a senior Hamas military commander, was assassinated in Dubai by a team of eight suspected Mossad officers who used counterfeit European passports, including Irish passports. The Irish government responded by expelling a staff member of the Israeli Embassy in Dublin. Ireland subsequently delayed an EU–Israel agreement which would involve allowing Israel to access sensitive information on EU citizens, and demanded that Israel tighten its data protection laws.

On 5 June 2010, the humanitarian aid vessel MV Rachel Corrie sailing from Ireland (where she had been refitted) to Gaza, was intercepted and seized by the Israeli Navy. This caused political tension between Ireland and Israel.

On 25 January 2011, Ireland upgraded the Palestinian envoy in Ireland to that of a full embassy, which resulted in the Irish Ambassador to Israel being summoned. Israel announced that it "regrets" the decision and it was "not surprised" due to the Irish government's "biased policy regarding the conflict over the years".

On 4 November 2011, the Irish ship MV Saoirse travelling to Gaza was intercepted by the Israeli Navy in international waters. The Navy boarded the ship, took those aboard in custody and towed it to Ashdod. In response, Irish Tánaiste and Minister for Foreign Affairs Eamon Gilmore stated that the Irish government do "not agree with [the Gaza blockade], (...) regard it as contrary to international humanitarian law in its impact on the civilian population of Gaza, and (...) have repeatedly urged Israel to end a policy which is unjust, counter-productive and amounts to collective punishment of 1.5 million Palestinians."

On 16 November 2011, unnamed sources from the Israeli Foreign Ministry claimed that "Ireland (is the) most hostile country in Europe" and was "pushing all of Europe's countries to a radical and uncompromising approach". The unnamed official made an accusation that "the Irish government is feeding its people with anti-Israel hatred" and that "what we are seeing here is clear anti-Semitism." The subsequent survey by the Anti-Defamation League of worldwide anti-Semitism proved that the unnamed source was incorrect, since Ireland was found to have less anti-Semitism than the average of European countries and a more favourable view of Israel. Additionally, an official from the Irish Foreign Affairs Department countered that "the Government is critical of Israeli policies in the occupied Palestinian territories. It is not hostile to Israel and it is clearly wrong to suggest as much," he said. "The notion that this Government is or would be trying to stoke up anti-Israeli feeling is untrue. We are not hostile to Israel. We are critical of policies, particularly in the occupied Palestinian territories. These are not the same things". Israel's ambassador to Ireland was reported as distancing himself from claims of Irish anti-Semitism.

In December 2012, the Israeli Embassy in Ireland posted on its Facebook page a comment that was viewed as racist and slanderous to Palestinians: "A thought for Christmas. ... If Jesus and mother Mary were alive today, they would, as Jews without security, probably end up being lynched in Bethlehem by hostile Palestinians. Just a thought ...". Within hours, the Embassy removed the statement, posting the following apology: "To whom it may concern: An image of Jesus and Mary with a derogatory comment about Palestinians was posted without the consent of the administrator of the Facebook page. We have removed the post in question immediately. Apologies to anyone who may have been offended. Merry Christmas!"

In early 2012 the Irish Palestine Solidarity Campaign organised a "cultural boycott" of Israel, as a result of which Irish music group Dervish cancelled a proposed tour of Israel, citing "an 'avalanche of negativity' and 'venom' directed towards them." This online campaign was officially condemned by Irish Justice Minister Alan Shatter and Irish Tánaiste and Minister for Foreign Affairs Eamon Gilmore.

In June 2012, Israel's Channel 10 published an e-mail in which Nurit Tinari-Modai, deputy ambassador to Ireland, proposed harassing expatriate Israelis who criticized Israeli policies, posting photos of them and publishing disinformation that would embarrass them. She claimed that they were critical of Israel because of their sexual identity. The Foreign Ministry quickly distanced itself from her letter, disavowing her approaches to handling critics. Her recommendation included the following: "You have to try and hit their soft underbellies, to publish their photographs, maybe that will cause embarrassment from their friends in Israel and their family, hoping that local activists would understand that they may actually be working on behalf of Mossad."

In September 2013 Israeli soldiers clashed with Palestinians, EU diplomats (including an Irish diplomat) and foreign activists at the site of a West Bank village demolished by the Israel Defense Forces. The diplomats were manhandled.

On 31 July 2014 on the 23rd day of the 2014 Israel–Gaza conflict, Ireland's Foreign Minister Charlie Flanagan said he shared "the horror and revulsion of senators and very many of our citizens at the horrendous scenes we have witnessed since the start of the Israeli military operation." The Irish government, he said, condemned "both the unacceptably high civilian casualty rate resulting from disproportionate military action on Israel's part as well as the firing of rockets by Hamas and other militants into Israel." The Israeli embassy in Dublin came under criticism twice in the month of July 2014, first for posts likening Free Palestine activists to Hitler, and second for posting edited images of iconic European art in ways that imply Islam is taking over Europe (see Islam in Europe and Islamophobic incidents). The image of the Irish Molly Malone statue was edited by the Israeli Embassy to show her covered with a Muslim veil along with the words, "Israel now, Dublin next." Following criticism that the anti-Muslim posting promoted hatred and were offensive, they were taken down. The embassy claims it meant no offence.

On 22 October 2014, the Seanad (Irish upper house of parliament) passed a motion calling on the government to give formal recognition to the State of Palestine and take active steps to promote a viable two-state solution to the Israeli-Palestinian conflict. The move follows similar initiatives in other European states, including Sweden and the United Kingdom. While Prime Minister Benjamin Netanyahu and most Israelis are opposed to the establishment of a Palestinian state within the pre-1967 borders, in December 2014 a petition was sent by over 800 Israelis asking Ireland to offer Palestine this recognition. The petition was sent to Ireland's Lower House ahead of a recognition vote already approved in the Upper House. Signatories to the letter included three well-known authors, Amos Oz and A.B. Yehoshua, both Israel Prize winners, and David Grossman, as well as former Foreign Ministry director-general Alon Liel. Subsequently, the Irish government announced that it would accept a motion proposing the recognition of Palestine, with 1967 borders and with East Jerusalem as the capital, as specified in U.N. resolutions. According to the Jerusalem Post, European countries have become frustrated with Israel, since peace talks have collapsed and Israel is still building settlements in Palestinian territories. Ireland will not be alone in recognising Palestine; Sweden became the largest Western European country to offer Palestine recognition, and parliaments in Spain, Britain and France have backed resolutions in favour of recognition. However, the Spanish and British governments, are at this time, refusing to recognise a Palestinian state.

=== 2018 to 2023 ===
In January 2018, Senator Frances Black proposed a private member's bill in the Irish Seanad which would have criminalised the purchase of goods and services from settlements in occupied territories, including Israeli settlements in the West Bank. The Control of Economic Activity (Occupied Territories) Bill 2018 was opposed by the Government and voting on the Bill has been postponed.

On 9 April 2018 Dublin City Council became the first European capital to vote in favour of resolutions endorsing the Boycott, Divestment and Sanctions (BDS) movement against Israel and calling for the expulsion of the Israeli Ambassador to Ireland. The City Council boycott motion included a specific call to boycott products and services from Hewlett Packard. On 10 April, the Lord Mayor of Dublin Mícheál Mac Donncha travelled to Ramallah to attend a Palestinian Authority conference on the status of Jerusalem, avoiding an Israeli government ban due to confusion arising from the spelling of his name in Irish on his passport. In response, the Israeli government summoned the Irish Ambassador to formally demand an explanation for the boycott motions of Dublin City Council and the Lord Mayor's attendance at the conference.

In 2019, despite opposition from the Government of Ireland, the Dáil passed the second stage of the 'Occupied Territories Bill' by 78 to 45 votes. If fully enacted, it will restrict the importation of goods that originated from any of the Israeli-occupied territories, including the settlements in the West Bank, Golan Heights and East Jerusalem. The Israeli ambassador to Ireland, Ophir Kariv said "it would make Ireland the most extreme anti-Israel country in the western world and entrench it deeply on the wrong side of history.", while supporters of Boycott, Divestment, Sanctions (BDS) policies reportedly described the bill as a "victory for the BDS movement" and Trócaire's chief executive, Caoimhe de Barra said it would serve as a good example for the rest of the European Union.

In May 2021, the Dáil declared that the building of Israeli settlements on Palestinian land was de facto annexation, becoming the first EU member state to do so. The motion proposing the declaration was proposed by the opposition, and was supported by the Government. An amendment calling for the expulsion of the Israeli ambassador was defeated.

=== October 7 attacks ===
==== Kim Damti ====
Kim Damti, a woman with Israeli and Irish citizenship, was declared missing after members of Hamas attacked the "Supernova Sukkot Gathering" music festival near Re'im in Israel on 7 October 2023. Through her mother, Jennifer, who is from Portlaoise, Damti held Irish citizenship. She and her four siblings would regularly spend their summers in Ireland.

On 9 October, Irish President Michael D. Higgins issued a statement, in which he said, "Any attacks on innocent civilians, such as those horrific scenes witnessed at the Supernova music festival and elsewhere, are deeply reprehensible... I send my deepest condolences to all of the families of the victims, and our thoughts at this time are, in particular, with the family of Kim Damti, our fellow citizen."

Damti was confirmed dead on 11 October 2023. Tributes were paid to her in the Irish parliament, Dáil Éireann, where Tánaiste Micheál Martin described her as "a young 22-year-old with her full life ahead of her only for it to be cut down in a barbaric way".

Taoiseach Leo Varadkar said, "This vibrant young Irish-Israeli woman was struck down in her prime, with her adult life ahead of her. Her death, and the deaths of more than a thousand other citizens of Israel and from around the world, was senseless and barbaric."

Damti's funeral was held on Thursday 12 October in Gedera. Speaking at the funeral, Irish Ambassador to Israel Sonya McGuinness said of Damti, "She was the best of your community and the best of our community and the best of who we are as a shared people."

==== Emily Hand ====
In November 2023, nine-year-old Emily Hand with joint Irish and Israeli citizenship was released as part of a hostage deal between Hamas and Israel. Irish Taoiseach Leo Varadkar's tweet welcoming her release as "an innocent child who was lost has now been found and returned" faced criticism from the Israeli President and Foreign Minister. They rejected the use of the word "lost" and said that she was not lost but had been kidnapped and taken hostage by Hamas.

=== Gaza war ===
In May 2024, in response to an encampment at Trinity College Dublin, the university's administration agreed to a set of demands outlined by the protestors, including complete divestment from investments in Israeli companies with activities in the Occupied Palestinian Territory and appear on the UN blacklist.

During early 2024, three flights carrying munitions for the Israeli Defence Force flew over Irish airspace. The IDF had not asked the Irish government for consent, according to Taoiseach Simon Harris, and an Irish government spokesperson said that the carrying of munitions was prohibited on any civil aircraft in Irish territory.

On 22 May 2024, the Foreign Minister of Israel, Israel Katz, announced the recall of the Israeli Ambassador, Dana Erlich, following the Irish government's announcement of its recognition of the State of Palestine on the 28th of May. Ireland's Ambassador to Israel, Sonya McGuinness, along with the Ambassadors of Norway and Spain, was summoned to the Israeli Foreign Affairs ministry for a diplomatic démarche at which they were shown footage of the Hamas attacks of 7 October 2023. The event was filmed by Israeli media and broadcast nationally. The Irish Tánaiste, Micheál Martin criticised the treatment of the Ambassador describing it as "outside the norm by which diplomats are treated in any country".

On 15 December 2024, the Foreign Minister of Israel, Gideon Sa'ar announced the closure of the Israeli embassy in Dublin due to what he described as the "extreme anti-Israel policy of the Irish government" which he characterised as "antisemitism". This decision came a week after the Irish government decided to formally intervene in South Africa's genocide case against Israel at the International Court of Justice. South Africa alleges that Israel has committed genocide in Gaza, which Israel vehemently denies. The decision to close the embassy was criticised by Israeli opposition leader Yair Lapid who said that the decision gave "victory to antisemitism and anti-Israel organizations" and described the Irish government's actions as "criticism" rather than antisemitism. The Irish Taoiseach, Simon Harris, described the closure of the embassy as "deeply regrettable" and rejected the assertion that Ireland is "anti-Israel", insisting that instead Ireland is "pro-peace, pro-human rights and pro-International law". Tánaiste Micheál Martin said that there were no plans to close the Irish embassy in Israel. In response to the Taoiseach's comments, Sa'ar accused Simon Harris of antisemitism and described the proceedings of the International Criminal Court as "politicised".

In February 2025, Israel Katz (then the Israeli Defense Minister) suggested that Palestinians displaced from Gaza by a plan proposed by Donald Trump (described by Human Rights Watch and other groups as a form of "ethnic cleansing") should immigrate to Ireland. Ireland rejected Katz's proposal.

On 16 May 2025, Taoiseach Micheál Martin signed a joint letter along with the heads of government of Iceland, Luxembourg, Malta, Norway, Slovenia and Spain calling on the Israeli government to halt its military action in Gaza and lift the ongoing aid blockade. Earlier that month, Martin said that the blockading by Israel of food and humanitarian aid to Gaza "clearly constitutes a war crime."

On 26 May 2026, Irish Foreign Minister Helen McEntee said Ireland plans to move forward with a law restricting trade in goods from Israeli settlements in the occupied West Bank despite opposition from Israel, some U.S. lawmakers, and international business groups. The Irish government said the move was based on international law and concerns over the continued expansion of settlements and rising settler violence in the West Bank.

In August 2026, several media outlets reported that a new state-owned jet might have difficulties landing because a ban on Israeli-manufactured components meant it was delivered without Israeli technology that helps planes to land in fog and other low-visibility conditions. Responding to media reports on the aircraft's capability, "including in Britain and Israel", the Irish Department of Defence reportedly stated that there were "no limitations on the operational capability" of the new aircraft.

== See also ==
- Foreign relations of Ireland
- Foreign relations of Israel
- Ireland–Palestine relations
- International recognition of Israel
- History of the Jews in Ireland
