= List of ambassadors of Ireland to Israel =

Ambassador of the Ireland to the State of Israel
- Coat of arms of Ireland
- Incumbent; Sonya McGuinness since 19 September 2023
- Type: Diplomat
- Website: www.ireland.ie/en/israel/telaviv/about/ambassador/

The ambassador of Ireland to the State of Israel is the official representative of the Irish government in Israel.

== Ambassadors ==
Name	Photo	Date from	Date until	Term length	References
Brendan Scannell		1996	2001	4 or 5 years	
Patrick Hennessey		2001	2005	3 or 4 years	
Michael Forbes		2005	2009	3 or 4 years	
Breifne O’Reilly		2009	2013	3 or 4 years	
Eamonn McKee		2013	2015	1 or 2 years	
Alison Kelly		2015	2019	3 or 4 years	
Kyle O'Sullivan		7 August 2019	18 September 2023	4 years, 1 month and 11 days	
Sonya McGuinness		19 September 2023	Incumbent	2 years, 11 months and 19 days	

== See also ==
- List of Irish ambassadors
- List of ambassadors of Israel to Ireland
