= Ophir Kariv =

Israeli diplomat

Israeli Ambassador to Ireland
- In office October 16, 2018 – August 2021
- Preceded by: Zeev Boker
- Succeeded by: Lironne Bar-Sadeh

Personal details
- Profession: Diplomat

Ophir Kariv is an Israeli diplomat, who served as Israel's ambassador to Ireland from 2018 to 2021.

== Biography ==
Kariv was born in Haifa, Israel. He earned a B.A. in International Relations from the Hebrew University and an MBA from University of Haifa.

== Diplomatic career ==
Kariv began his career with the Ministry of Foreign Affairs in 1994. He was Director of the Department for Israeli Consulates in the United States and has also held roles in the Public Diplomacy Division and in the Human Rights and Humanitarian Affairs Department in the Ministry of Foreign Affairs. He has also been Deputy Head of Mission in Israel’s embassies in Bulgaria, Denmark and Thailand. Before moving to his role in Ireland, he was Director of the Northern Europe Department in Israel’s Ministry of Foreign Affairs.

Kariv presented his credentials to the President of Ireland, Mr. Michael D. Higgins, on October 16, 2018, showing him to be Ambassador Extraordinary and Plenipotentiary of Israel to Ireland. He participated in the "Holocaust Memorial Day Commemoration" where Michael D. Higgins, President of Ireland, was the keynote speaker on January 27, 2019.
