= Zion Evrony =

Israeli Ambassador

- ציון עברוני

Israeli Ambassador to Holy See
- In office 2012–2016

Israeli Ambassador to Ireland
- In office 2006–2010
- Preceded by: Daniel Megiddo
- Succeeded by: Boaz Moda'i

Personal details
- Education: Hebrew University

Zion Evrony (Hebrew: ציון עברוני) is a retired Israeli diplomat, formerly serving as Israel's ambassador to Ireland and the Holy See.

== Biography ==
Evrony was born in Tehran, Iran. Shortly after his birth his family migrated to the recently formed Israeli state, where he lived in a Ma'abarot camp. He later studied at the Hebrew University in Jerusalem. He holds a Bachelor of Arts in sociology and political science, a master's in Business Administration, and a Ph.D. in international relations.

Evrony serves as an associate professor in the Center for Jewish Civilization at Georgetown University. In addition he serves as adjunct professor at the Catholic University of America and Howard University. He was previously a visiting lecturer at Tel Aviv University and the Hebrew University of Jerusalem.
