= List of ambassadors of Israel to Ireland =

== List of ambassadors ==
Name	Start	End	Source
Dana Erlich	2023	2025	(Note: Ambassador recalled on 22 May 2024 following Ireland's recognition of state of Palestine. Closure of Israeli Embassy in Dublin announced on 15 December 2024. Ambassador due to remain in role as non-resident ambassador until mid-2025)
Lironne Bar-Sadeh	2021	2023	
Ophir Kariv	2018	2021	
Zeev Boker	2015	2018	
Boaz Moda'i	2010	2015	
Zion Evrony	2006	2010	
Daniel Megiddo	2002	2006	
Mark Sofer	1999	2002	
Zvi Gabay	1994	1999	(Note: First ambassador to reside in Dublin, Ireland rather than London, United Kingdom. Ambassadors thereafter continue to reside in Dublin.)
Yoav Biran	1988	1993	
Yehuda Avner	1983	1988	
Shlomo Argov	1979	1982	
Avraham Kidron	1977	1979	
Gideon Rafael	1974	1977	

== See also ==
- Ireland–Israel relations
