= Stratford College =

Independent second-level school in Dublin, Ireland

Location
- 1 Zion Road, Rathgar; Ireland; 53.3097°N 6.2743°W

Information
- Type: Voluntary
- Religious affiliation: Judaism
- Established: 1952; 74 years ago
- Website: www.stratfordcollege.ie

Stratford College is an independent co-educational multi-denominational day school on the junction of Zion Road and Orwell Road, Dublin, Ireland predominantly for people of the Jewish faith. One of the main founders was Elaine Feldman. The school is located adjacent to Herzog Park.

The school evolved from the opening of Stratford National School in September 1952 on Terenure Road East with a small group of children from the Jewish national school on Bloomfield Avenue in Portobello. The school takes its name from a house by the name of Stratford on Terenure Road East which was designed by the architect Thomas Drew in 1877.

The school building on Zion Road was originally a house built in 1873. It was badly damaged in a fire caused by vandals in 1979 but reopened in 1983 with only the facade being retained. The building was originally designed by the architect Alfred Edwin Jones.

As of 2023, the school is officially multi-denominational.

School fees for the 2022–23 academic year were €4,400.

== Sport ==
=== Football ===
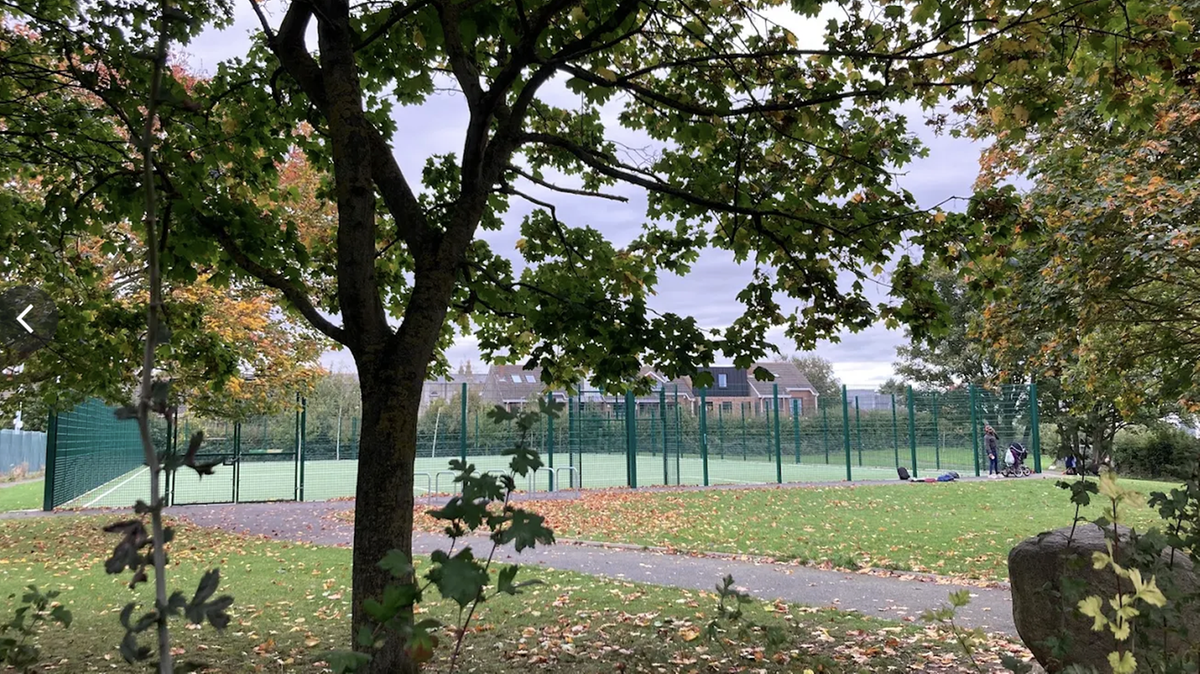
Herzog Park astro pitch in Rathgar used by Stratford College football teams for training and matches.

Stratford College fields a boys' football squad that competes in both Junior and Minor competitions organized by the Metropolitan Boys League. Home fixtures and training sessions take place on the school playing field located behind the main campus as well as at Herzog Park in Rathgar.

The team was reformed before the 2023–24 season when Thomas O’Reilly became coach. Under his guidance, using Stratford's signature defensive football technique colloquially known as "haramball", the team gradually improved from early heavy defeats.

Ianis serves as the team's captain, with Emmet as vice-captain. Emmet captained the team in the friendly against Greenhills Community College on 24 March 2026.

=== 2023–24 season ===
In the 2023–24 season, Stratford participated in the Metropolitan Boys League:

- Junior League Division Three, Group C – finished 4th.
- Minor League Division Three, Group F – finished 4th.

In the Boys Junior B Cup, Stratford was knocked out in the first round against Greenhill, losing 6–1. In the Minor B Cup, Stratford was also eliminated in their first game, losing 10–0 to Greenhill.

Pádraig was among the players who represented the team during this season.

=== 2024–25 season ===
In the 2024–25 season, Stratford competed in:

- Metropolitan Boys Junior League Division Three South, Group A – finished 3rd.
- Metropolitan Boys Minor League Division Three South, Group D – finished 3rd.
- Boys Minor B Cup – knocked out in the first round by Presentation College.

In the newly formed Shield competition for teams eliminated early, Stratford recorded its first-ever win since the team was reformed, defeating John Scotus S.S. Rathmichael 2–1 in the quarter-final after extra time, despite having two red cards by half-time. The team reached the semi-final, drawing 1–1 in normal time against Rathdown School, but eventually lost 4–1 after extra time, with only ten players available.

=== 2025–26 season ===
In the 2025–26 season, Stratford competed in:

- Metropolitan Boys Junior League Division Three South, Group C – finished 3rd.
- Metropolitan Boys Minor League Division Three South, Group C – finished 2nd.

On 7 November 2025, Stratford defeated Goatstown ETSS 1–0, with Roberto scoring the winning goal. The victory was the team's first of the 2025–26 season. The matchday squad was Ianis (captain), Luke, Vihaan, Thomas, John-Luke, Emmet, Roberto, Brodie, Rory, John, Liam and Dylan.

On 11 December 2025, Stratford defeated James' Street CBS 2–1, securing qualification for the knockout stage for the first time in the school's history. Brodie scored his first goal for Stratford with a header, before Emmet scored the second goal, also his first for the team. The matchday squad was Ianis (captain), Luke, Vihaan, Thomas, John-Luke, Emmet, Roberto, Brodie, Dylan, John, Cathal and Liam.

In the quarter-final, Stratford lost 2–1 to St. Killian’s. In the Boys Minor B Cup, Stratford was eliminated in the first round against Cabra Coláiste Mhuire, losing 4–1.

On 24 March 2026, in their first match following elimination from the cup, Stratford recorded a 9–7 victory over Greenhills Community College in a friendly played in Walkinstown. This was the highest number of goals scored by the team in a single match at that time. Brodie and Roberto scored in the first half, which ended 2–2. Stratford used a 5–3–2 formation rather than its usual 5–4–1 formation. Emmet captained the team for the first time in this match.

The team received a new kit sponsored by Mehek Indian Restaurant, Rathgar. The team’s progress and development have been guided by coach Thomas O’Reilly and assistant Jim-Bob, an adult member of staff.

=== 2026–27 season ===
In the 2026–27 season, Stratford competed in the U17 Cup and the U19 Senior League Division 3.

On 15 October 2026, Stratford defeated Blackrock ETSS 3–1 in the U19 Senior League Division 3. Roberto scored the opening goal, followed by an own goal by a Blackrock player. Javier scored Stratford's third goal after receiving a through ball from Cathal. The result was described as the team's first U19 football victory in a couple of years.

On 19 October 2026, Stratford defeated St Patrick’s Cathedral 3–2 in the U17 Cup round of 16, recovering from a 2–0 deficit in the opening 15 minutes. Javier and Dylan scored before half-time to equalise, before Ethan scored the winning goal in the second half. The victory secured Stratford a place in the quarter-finals against St Laurence’s College. The report was written by Ianis, identified as a team captain.

On 21 October 2026, Stratford faced St Gerard’s School in the U19 Senior League Division 3, losing 9–1. Emmet scored Stratford's goal with an overhead kick from the edge of the penalty area.

=== Players ===
Players recorded in the team's squad lists and additional player records include:

- Ianis
- Luke (two players)
- Vihaan
- Thomas
- John-Luke
- Emmet
- Roberto
- Brodie
- Rory
- John
- Liam
- Dylan
- Cathal
- Javier
- Ethan (two players)
- Ziad
- Yu Ming
- Jacob
- Pádraig
- Esmail
- Praise
- Colin
- Adam

== Notable alumni ==
- Shimmy Marcus

== See also ==
- The High School, Dublin
