= Alison Kelly (diplomat) =

Irish diplomat (born 1953)

Ireland's Ambassador to Israel
- In office 6 November 2015 – July 2019
- Preceded by: Eamonn McKee
- Succeeded by: Kyle O'Sullivan

Ireland's Ambassador to the Czech Republic
- In office 2012–2015

Ireland's Ambassador to Ukraine
- In office 2012–2015

Personal details
- Born: 1953 (age 72–73) Drogheda, Ireland
- Education: University College, Dublin

Alison Kelly (born 1953) is a former Irish diplomat.

== Early life and education ==
Kelly was born in Drogheda, County Louth, Ireland. In 1973 she graduated from University College, Dublin with a Bachelor of Social Science degree and in 1974 she graduated from the College of Europe in Bruges, Belgium with a Certificate in Advanced European Studies.

== Career ==
Kelly started her career in Ireland's Department of Foreign Affairs in 1974. Early in her career she was stationed at The Hague (1976–79), Cairo (1983–86), CSCE/OSCE in Vienna as well as assignments in other locations. From 1998 to 2002 she served as UN Director, Department of Foreign Affairs concurrently with Africa Director 1999–2000. She served as Political Counsellor at Ireland's Embassy in Washington, D.C. from 2003 to 2007. From 2007 to 2011 she held roles as Deputy Political Director and Director for Disarmament and Non-Proliferation in the Department of Foreign Affairs. She held responsibility for the Diplomatic Conference in Dublin in 2008, which adopted the Convention on Cluster Munitions. Kelly served as Ireland's chief delegate to the NPT review in 2010, and chaired the negotiations on the Middle East at the 2010 NPT Review Conference, garnering accolades from the Laura Kennedy, the US Representative to the Conference, who noted Kelly had done a "remarkable job" dealing with very difficult issues in the section on the Middle East.

=== Ambassador to the Czech Republic and Ukraine ===
Kelly was Ambassador of Ireland to the Czech Republic and to Ukraine from 2012 until 2015. In February 2012 she presented credentials to President Václav Klaus, who was President of the Czech Republic from 2003 to 2013. She presented credentials in July 2012 to President Viktor Yanukovych of Ukraine.

=== Ambassador to Israel ===
In November 2015 she became Ireland's ambassador to Israel, replacing Eamonn McKee, who returned to Ireland in the summer of 2015 when he was appointed Director General of the Trade and Promotion Division of the Department of Foreign Affairs and Trade. Kelly presented her credentials to Israeli President Reuven Rivlin noting, "My team and I will continue to work to strengthen and expand the co-operation between our countries, especially in the fields of technology and medical advances, among others. In welcoming her Rivlin said, "In many ways, Israel and Ireland are so similar. Ireland, like Israel, is a beautiful country, filled with a mix of tradition and faith. I want to express my high regard for the ongoing economic, cultural, and academic co-operation between our countries."

He observed that Kelly had arrived at a difficult point in time, but underscored that his country was committed to the status-quo on the Temple Mount, "Israel has no war with Islam, and we have no intention to change the status-quo agreement on the Temple Mount – we have not, and will not change one letter of the agreement."

Kelly quickly faced controversy when the EU, of which Ireland is a member, incurred the wrath of Israel in announcing that all member states must clearly label goods that have been manufactured in Israeli settlements in the occupied territories. Going forward the EU will only allow the "Israel" label to be used for Israel proper, not occupied territories. Israel's Foreign Ministry summoned the ambassador from the European Union to protest the decision, and an unidentified spokesperson said Kelly had been summoned as well. The Yedioth Ahronoth newspaper claimed the ambassador would be told that meetings she plans for herself or visiting Irish officials would be restricted to low-tier diplomats, and that measures would be taken against all 16 EU member states, including Ireland, which urged the EU to adopt labelling. "From now on, we will be miserly with these guests," a high-ranking Israeli official told the Yediot Aharonot. "Whoever has taken hostile action against us will pay a price."

In December 2015 Kelly was a guest speaker at a special forum in Raanana, Israel, marking 40 years of diplomatic exchange between Israel and Ireland. She joined other guest speakers, the former Israeli Ambassador to Ireland Boaz Moda'i and Prof. Tamar Hermann, director of international academic initiatives at the Open University of Israel, in discussing bilateral relations.

On 17 March 2016 Kelly assisted in presenting United Nations Disengagement Observer Force (UNDOF) Medals to 135 Irish soldiers of the 50th Infantry Group based in Camp Ziouani in the Golan Heights and reflect Ireland's "valuable contribution to peace and security in the region." UNDOF, (the United Nations Disengagement Observer Force) was established in 1974 to supervise the implementation of the Agreement on Disengagement and maintain the ceasefire with an area of separation known as the UNDOF Zone. Currently there are more than 1,000 UN peacekeepers there trying to sustain a lasting peace.

Kelly retired from the diplomatic service in July 2019.
