= Summerhill, Dublin =

District in Dublin, Ireland

Summerhill Cnoc an tSamhraidh (Irish)
- Inner city district
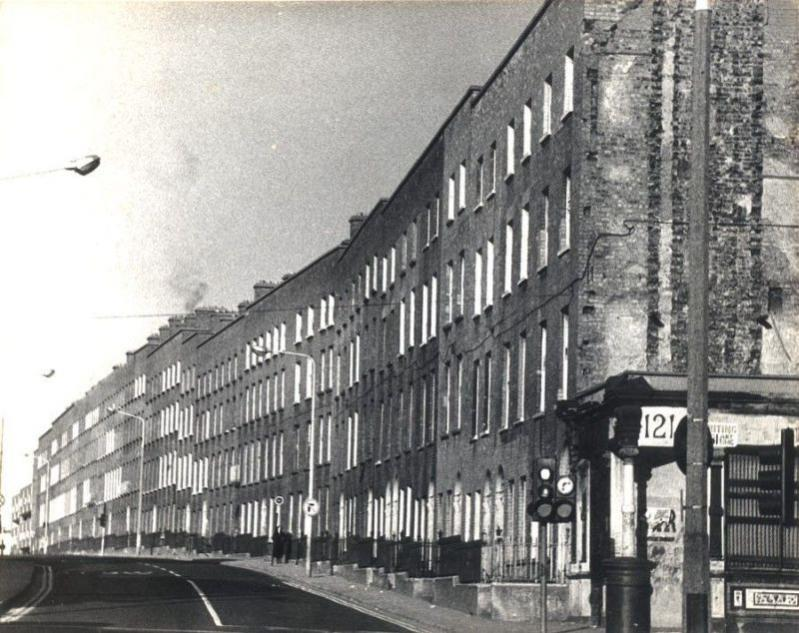
- Georgian housing on Summerhill Parade, Dublin

- Location in Ireland
- Coordinates: 53°21′23″N 6°15′04″W
- Country: Ireland
- Province: Leinster
- County: Dublin
- Local authority: Dublin City Council
- Time zone: UTC+0 (WET)
  - Summer (DST): UTC-1 (IST (WEST))

Summerhill (Irish: Cnoc an tSamhraidh) is a mainly residential area of Dublin, Ireland, on the Northside of the city. Its approximate borders are Gardiner Street in the west, Mountjoy Square, Ballybough in the north, northeast and east, and Talbot Street and Amiens Street in the south and southeast. The name derives from the eponymous street of Summerhill Parade. It is one of the city's most densely populated and economically deprived areas.

== History ==
Prior to wholesale redevelopment in the second half of the 18th century, Summerhill Parade formed one of the main routes through and out of the city to the north from the Bridge of Dublin to the bridge at Ballybough over the River Tolka.

=== 18th century ===
The area was mostly developed in the last quarter of the 18th century around the same time as the development of Mountjoy Square with terraces of large four-storey over basement red brick Georgian houses along streets such as Summerhill Parade, Buckingham Street and Gardiner Street. The northern side of Summerhill Parade was developed first.

=== 19th century ===
In the later 19th century, the area became known more for tenement housing and the Monto red-light district.

=== 20th century ===
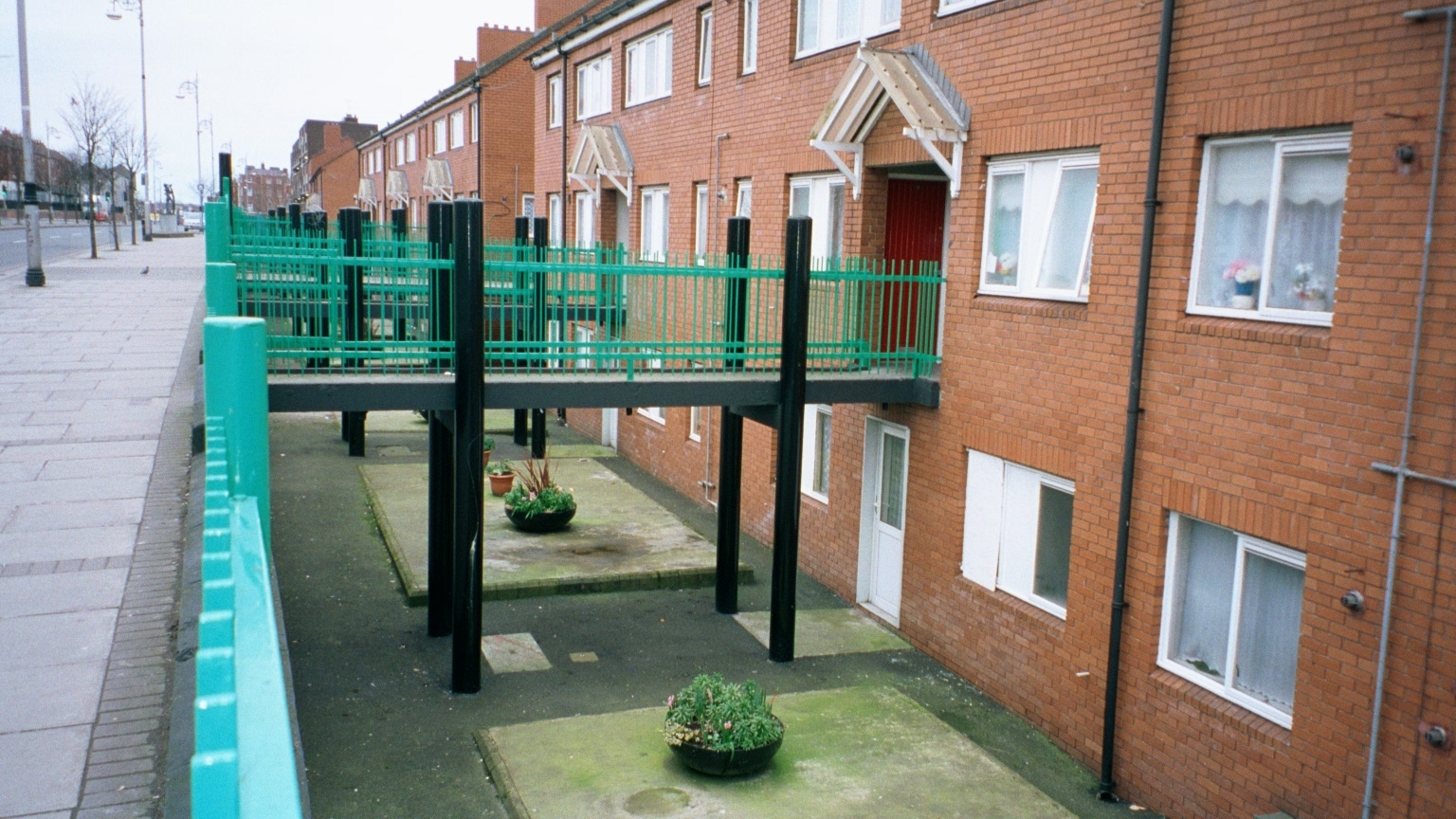
Social housing on Summerhill Parade in 2004 which replaced about 40 five-storey Georgian houses

In the second half of the 20th century, the large Georgian houses were mostly replaced with large-scale social housing schemes. Streets such as Summerhill Parade were entirely demolished (about 40 five-storey Georgian houses) and replaced with social housing. In 1981, approximately 120 Georgian houses were demolished in Summerhill.

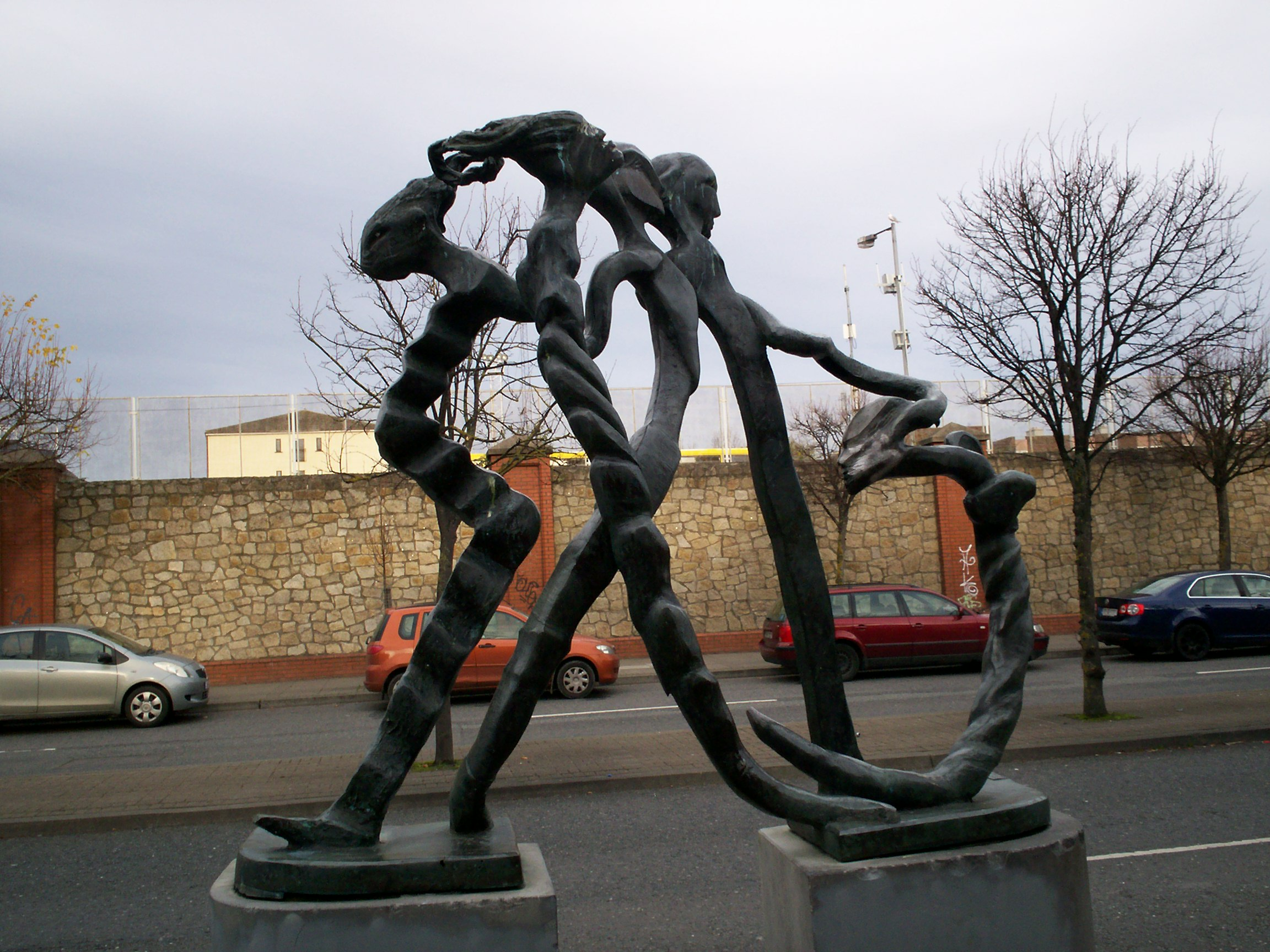
Summerhill Group sculpture (1992)

In 1992, the sculpture Summerhill Group was unveiled. It is a bronze work on Kilkenny limestone by Cathy Carman and was commissioned by Dublin Corporation as part of the Per Cent for Art Scheme. The work invokes the history of the street, before its redevelopment into a dual carriageway, when children would play on the street.

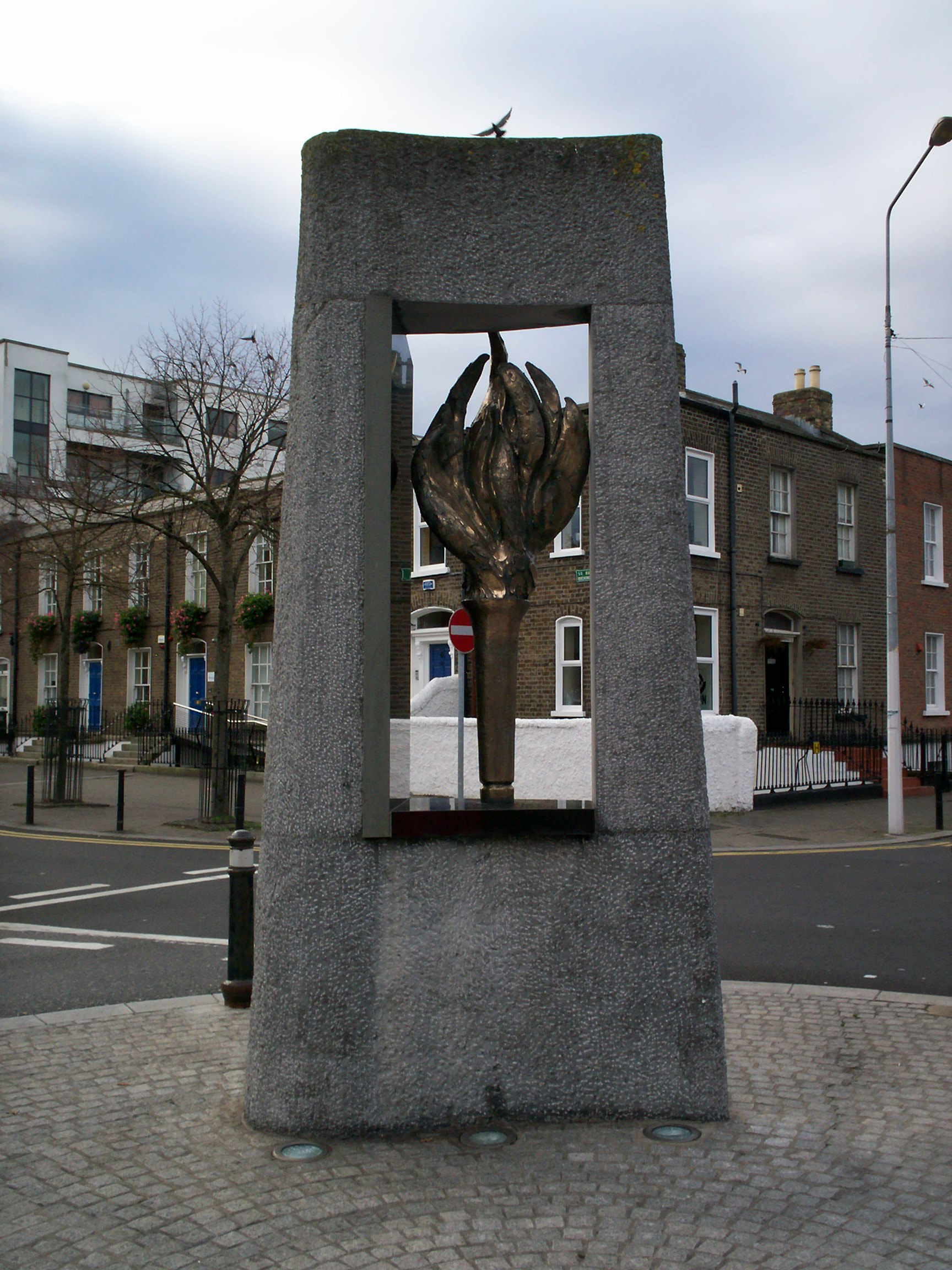
Sculpture entitled Home at the intersection of Buckingham Street Lower, Sean MacDermott Street Lower, and Killarney Street to commemorate lives lost to drug abuse

== John Hutton and Sons ==
For almost 140 years a successful coachbuilding enterprise existed at Summerhill, originally established on nearby Great Britain Street in 1779 by 22-year-old John Hutton, the son of a tannery owner. In 1788 the Lord Lieutenant of Ireland ordered two new mail coaches to be built by Hutton as models, adhering to the design of the patent mail coaches used all over England at the time, effectively granting the company the entirety of the Irish mail coach contract. On the strength of this lucrative contract, the company was enabled to move to larger premises on Summerhill, which it did in 1789. At the time, relocating to Summerhill was considered by many to be a bold move owing to its distance from the great thoroughfares of the city and the inevitable lack of trade and business potential. In 1791 the Lord Mayor of Dublin's coach was built, which was still used on ceremonial occasions as of 2004. The business thrived nonetheless, providing coaches to the aristocracy and great families of Ireland before the Acts of Union 1800 shifted the focus of the Irish high society from Dublin to London and new carriages were not required as often. In 1821 George IV granted a royal patent to the company, followed by a royal warrant issued by William IV in 1836 and confirmed by Queen Victoria in 1837. The introduction of the railways as well as the Great Famine led to a decline in the business. Possibly one of the most famous coaches produced by the firm at this time was the Irish State Coach, ordered by Queen Victoria in 1852, which is still used today by the reigning British monarch whenever they travel from Buckingham Palace to the Palace of Westminster to formally open the new legislative session of the UK Parliament.

The company adapted to producing motor cars in the late 1800s. In the early 1920s Huttons turned down the option to take control of the Ford franchise for the whole of the United Kingdom, an error which contributed to Huttons having to file for voluntary liquidation in 1925. The premises at Summerhill was sold to the Dublin United Tramway Company soon after and is now a depot of Dublin Bus.

== People ==
Former or current residents of the area have included:

- Todd Andrews, political activist and public servant
- John Keegan Casey, poet, orator and republican famous for writing the song "The Rising of the Moon"
- Bill Cullen, businessman and media personality
- Thomas Farrell, sculptor
- Peadar Kearney, republican and composer
- Barry Keoghan, actor
- Richard Edmund Meredith (1855–1916), Master of the Rolls in Ireland, Privy Councillor and Judicial Commissioner of the Irish Land Commission
- Kathleen Mulhall, mother of Irish murderers Linda and Charlotte Mulhall, who lived in Richmond Cottages, Summerhill in 2005
- Cornelius O'Brien, politician and Member of Parliament
- Clementina Robertson, miniature-painter
- Terence Wheelock, 20-year-old who died on 16 September 2005, from alleged injuries received in the custody of An Garda Síochána (police)

== See also ==
- List of streets and squares in Dublin
