= Terence Wheelock =

Death after police custody in Ireland

Terence Wheelock was a 20-year-old Irish man from Summerhill in Dublin's north inner city, who died on 16 September 2005 having fallen into a coma as a result of injuries sustained at Store Street Garda Station on 2 June 2005. Wheelock's death occurred following his arrest alongside three others on suspicion of car theft. After being detained at Store Street Garda Station, he was discovered unconscious in his cell around two hours later. The complexities surrounding his custody and subsequent death led to an inquest, culminating on 13 July 2007, when a coroner's jury concluded by 4:3 that his death resulted from suicide. The events leading to and following Wheelock's death have continued to raise questions about the treatment of detainees and the protocols followed by law enforcement, highlighting a critical moment of scrutiny and calls for reform within the Irish justice system.

== Circumstances leading up to his death ==
Garda Tadhg O’Leary, from Fitzgibbon Street Garda station, said Gardaí received a phone call from a woman on that day to report a car being brought into a back yard at Sean O’Casey Avenue and being covered with a sheet.

Garda O'Leary had a check run on the black Toyota Yaris, and the owner in Donnybrook confirmed it had been stolen. He later spotted four young men in the car.

Gardaí confirmed all four were surrounded in the square at the front of the house by officers and gave themselves up shortly after midday. The inquest heard Wheelock and another man were brought to Store Street Garda station. At that point, O'Leary said he discovered two bench warrants were in existence for Wheelock and he would have to be held to appear before the District Court. “At the time of the arrest of the youths they were caught red-handed”, he said.

== Death ==
Wheelock died in hospital on 16 September 2005, after he was found unconscious in a cell in Store Street Garda Station two weeks earlier.

An inquiry by the Garda Ombudsman into Wheelock's death found he was not mistreated in any way in Store Street Garda Station. While no individual Garda was found to be culpable in relation to Wheelock's death, the report identified a number of system failures including the failure to remove the cord from his tracksuit and to properly record details in custody. In addition, the entirety of the GSOC report was not published to the public, in the "public Interest".

=== Garda and family views ===
The Garda Síochána stated that Terence committed suicide while in his cell, hanging himself with a ligature which "was secured to a fixture which is countersunk into the wall". Kieran Bisset, a member of Dublin Fire Brigade who provide ambulance cover in the Dublin area, said a number of Gardaí were performing CPR on the unconscious man when the Fire Brigade were called after 2:30 p.m. "There was an obvious ligature mark around the front of his neck", he said, adding it was deep and previous experience would indicate it was from a cord or a shoelace. The Gardaí stated that on observing Terence in the cell they took him into the open cell area where CPR was performed.

Wheelock's family contested the idea that Terence had hanged himself. His family believes Wheelock died as a result of injuries received from the gardaí while in custody. Larry Wheelock, one of Terence's 10 siblings, claimed his brother was a victim of police brutality.

== Other ==
- The Dublin City Coroner's Court earlier heard that bruising on Mr Wheelock were consistent with medical intervention.
- Dr Maureen Smith from the Forensic Science Laboratory told the court she was unable to generate a DNA profile from the tissue sample she was given from the post mortem. Using blood samples, she determined that blood found on Mr Wheelock's T-shirt was not his blood, but most likely that of a close relative, a matter she said that merited further investigation.
- The Garda press statement mentioned that there was no evidence of any bruising on Terence's body. Gardaí stated they noticed no bruising when Terence Wheelock was strip-searched while being detained at Store Street Garda Station. This was contradicted by his family who saw extensive bruising to his body in the hospital, prompting hospital staff to record photographs of the bruising. The inquest explored the origin of extensive bruising with Dr Marie Cassidy the state pathologist. When shown original Photographs of bruising taken on 3 June 2005, the day after Wheelock's arrest. Cassidy informed the Coroner the photos displayed at the inquest differed and were poorer in quality from the photos supplied to her by investigating Gardaí. This changed her perspective regarding bruising of knuckles, hands and legs and lower back. She agree the bruising of the knuckles could be consistent with defensive wounds or an assault.
- When the family managed to get hold of the custody records the names of the arresting Gardaí had been altered to show another name which Gardaí explained was due to an error. Gardaí stated that this amendment was made at the time of arrival and not later. The Wheelock family claimed they had to make many attempts to recover Terence's clothes for independent forensic examination. These attempts were continually rebuffed. When the family finally received the clothes worn by Terence, they claim the clothing was heavily bloodstained.
- The Garda Commissioner appointed Detective Superintendent Oliver Hanley from Dun Laoghaire Garda Station to look into the events around Terence's death. Hanley served in Store Street station for over fifteen years. Therefore, it has been questioned whether he could be said to be truly independent.
- The morning after he was taken away in a coma, the Gardaí repainted the cell where Terence sustained his injuries.

== Reaction ==
=== Demonstrations ===
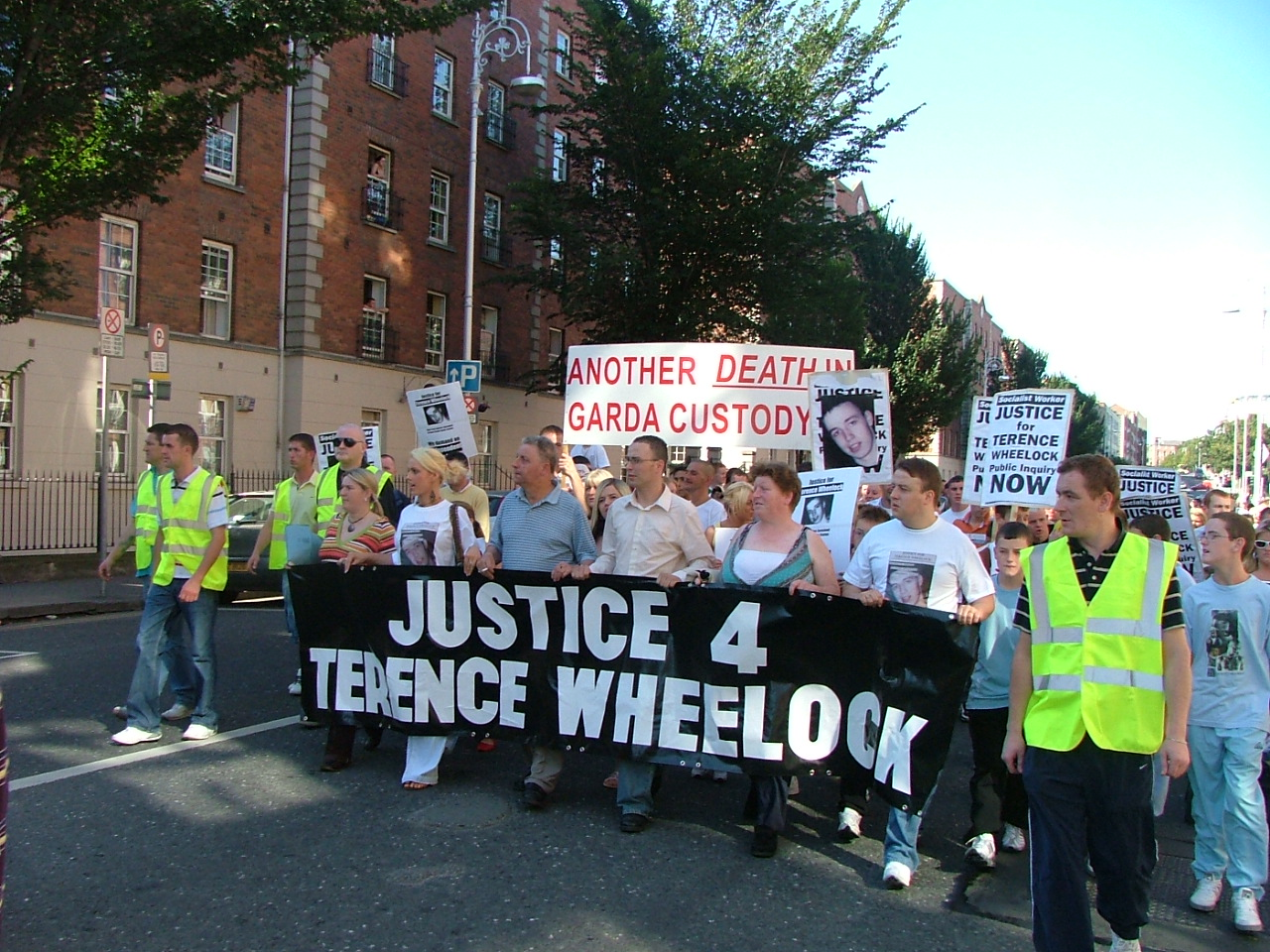
"Justice for Terence" demonstration (June 2006)

There were protests in favour of an independent inquiry into the death of Terence Wheelock in many locations including Store Street Garda Station, Dáil Éireann, and the Minister for Justice.

=== Investigation ===
In July 2007, the Garda Síochána Ombudsman Commission announced that it would carry out an investigation into the case. Terence's brother, Larry Wheelock told journalists that an official from the Ombudsman's office had contacted the family to inform them it was to launch an inquiry for various reasons. Among these, he said, were that it is in the public interest to investigate the circumstances surrounding the death; the close nature of the verdict (a four-to-three majority), and the injuries on Terence's body.

== Legacy ==
A proposal to rename Diamond Park, in Dublin's North Inner City, in honour of Terence Wheelock was put to Dublin City Council in 2025 alongside a controversial proposal to rename Herzog Park in Rathgar. People Before Profit said that "the renaming of Diamond Park would be a recognition of Terence’s life, but also a commitment to transparency, justice and the need for an independent public inquiry". The proposal was subsequently withdrawn in December 2025 citing a failure to follow the correct statutory procedure.

In June 2026, five councillors from Dublin City Council lodged papers to initiate judicial review proceedings against the Minister for Housing, Local Government and Heritage citing a failure to legislate for renaming of parks, with specific reference to the renaming of both Diamond Park and Herzog Park. The councillors include Conor Reddy, People Before Profit, Independents Cieran Perry and Vincent Jackson, and Sinn Féin's Ciarán Ó Meachair and Mícheál Mac Donncha. The department has cited "legislative complexities" between the Local Government Act 2001 and the Official Languages Act 2003 which they said may require primary legislation to resolve.
