= Elaine Feldman =

Irish public figure and founder of a secondary school for the Dublin Jewish community

- Born: Elaine Freeman; 31 March 1916; Harold's Cross, Dublin, Ireland
- Died: 19 October 2006 (aged 90); Neville Avenue, Rathgar, Dublin

Elaine Feldman (31 March 1916 – 19 October 2006) was an Irish public figure and co-founder of the first secondary school for the Jewish community in Dublin.

== Early life and family ==
Elaine Feldman was born Elaine Freeman at 19 Kenilworth Park, Harold's Cross, Dublin on 31 March 1916. She was the second child of Maurice and Ada Freeman (née Price). Her father was a Russian immigrant who had a number of businesses on Kevin Street, and her mother volunteered with the local Jewish school at the Adelaide Road Synagogue, training young Jewish children in their religion. Like many other Jewish children, Feldman attended the Protestant Wesley College, as Protestant schools were more accommodating of the needs of observant Jews. Feldman was appointed the first day-girl prefect at age 14, when she complained that day girls were unsupervised at lunchtime. She was awarded a bursary to Trinity College Dublin based on her Leaving Certificate results, but instead she entered the civil service upon leaving school in 1934. She first worked Department of Finance, and after the declaration of the Emergency, in the Department of Defence. It was noted that her arrival and departure from Dublin Castle on her bicycle often drew a crowd of people supposedly unaccustomed to seeing a Jew. She married Jacob 'Jack' Feldman (died 1985) on 31 March 1941. He was a commercial traveller and later a shop owner. Owing to the marriage bar, Feldman had to resign from her civil service job. The couple had two sons and one daughter, Maurice, Alec, and Estelle.

== Stratford College ==
When the Feldman's children were old enough for secondary school, both of them were unhappy at the limited choices available to Jewish children, especially as there was a lack of space in Protestant schools. They also feared that a secular education would leave their children without a full appreciation of their heritage as orthodox observant Jews. In 1952, Feldman was among the five people at a meeting in Chief Rabbi Immanuel Jakobvits's house, a meeting that would lead eventually to the foundation of the first Jewish secondary school in Ireland, Stratford College, Rathgar. In September 1952 the school opened on Terenure Road East with a small group of children from the Jewish national school in Bloomfield Avenue. Feldman served on the board of governors as honorary secretary for 17 years, managing all aspects of the school's running as well as lobbying civil servants and politicians for support.

As the school grew, Feldman oversaw the purchase of a larger building, 1 Zion Road, in 1954, agreeing to pay £4,250 before a financial arrangement was in place. Panicked by the situation, she consulted with the manager of the Northern Bank, who concurred with her decision and loaned the additional money to equip the school on sureties of Jack Feldman and another four Jewish businessmen. Alongside Jewish children, those of other faiths also attended the school. Feldman found support for a large number of scholarships for Jewish children whose parents could not afford tuition. The scholarships also covered the cost of the uniforms and books. The school established an award in honour of Feldman, awarded to students for literary merit. She collaborated with Dr Dermot Ryan to have Hebrew added to the subjects recognised at the Leaving Certificate.

From about 1970, Feldman lectured on Jewish doctrines and beliefs to Christian audiences at the Adelaide Road Synagogue, with Jewish community leaders and British rabbis also attending at times. She was nominated to become a founding member of the Irish Council of Christians and Jews by the Chief Rabbi David Rosen. She also gave talks to Dublin schoolchildren on inter-faith understanding. She volunteered at the headquarters of the Irish Girl Guides for many years, serving as controller of the guide shop, overseeing its development into a large and efficient business. For a time she was district commissioner, and continued to be active in guiding after her official retirement, being one of the oldest women involved in the Girl Guides anywhere in the world. Feldman suffered from lifelong chronic illness, but was an active golfer and was life lady president of the Jewish golf club at Edmondstown.

Feldman died on 19 October 2006 at her home in Neville Avenue, Rathgar.
