= List of ambassadors of Israel to Latvia =

== List of ambassadors ==
- Sandra Simovich 2024 - current
- Sharon Rappaport Palgi 2021 - 2024
- Orli Gil 2019-2021
- Lironne Bar-Sade 2015 - 2019
- Hagit Ben-Yaakov 2011 - 2015
- Chen Ivri Apter 2006 - 2010
- Gary Koren 2003 - 2006
- Avraham Benjamin 2000 - 2003
- Tova Herzl 1993 - 1996
