= Embassy of Israel, Dublin =

Israeli diplomatic mission in Ireland

שגרירות ישראל בדבלין Embassy of Israel in Dublin
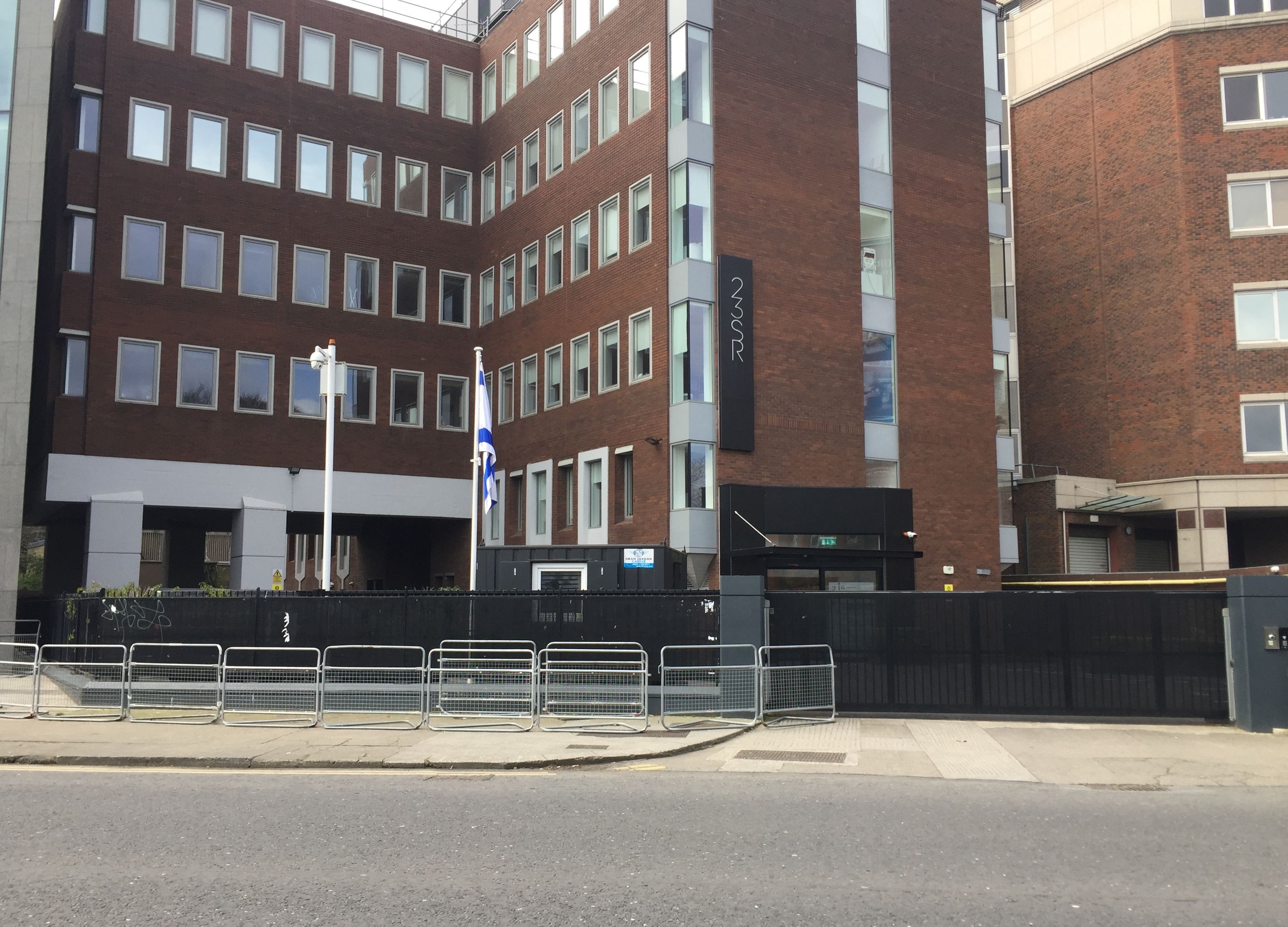
- Location: Ballsbridge, Dublin
- Address: 23 Shelbourne Road, Dublin, D04 PY68
- Coordinates: 53°19′56″N 6°13′54″W
- Ambassador: None

The Embassy of Israel in Dublin is the diplomatic mission of Israel in Ireland.

== History ==
Ireland extended de jure recognition to Israel in 1963, and both countries established diplomatic relations in 1975. In 1981, however, Ireland condemned Israel's attack on Iraq's Osirak nuclear reactor. An Israeli embassy opened in Dublin in January 1996. Zvi Gabay was the first resident Israeli ambassador in Ireland.

In December 2024, Israel announced that its embassy in Ireland would close owing to what the Israeli foreign minister Gideon Sa'ar described as Irish "demonisation of the Jewish state" during the Gaza war. Ireland's Taoiseach, Simon Harris, responded to the announcement, saying "Ireland’s foreign policy is founded on our deep commitment to dialogue and to the peaceful resolution of disputes." He added, "I utterly reject the assertion that Ireland is anti-Israel. Ireland is pro-peace, pro-human rights and pro-international law." The Tánaiste, Micheál Martin said, "The continuation of the war in Gaza and the loss of innocent lives is simply unacceptable and contravenes international law. It represents the collective punishment of the Palestinian people in Gaza."

In January 2025, Dana Erlich confirmed that she would remain in the role of ambassador until mid-2025 at which point Israel would appoint a non-resident ambassador.
