= Dana Erlich =

Israeli diplomat

H.E. Ms Dana Erlich
- דנה ארליך

Head of Mission at the Israeli Embassy in Spain
- Incumbent
- Assumed office August 2025
- President: Isaac Herzog
- Preceded by: Dan Poraz

Israeli Ambassador to Ireland
- In office August 2023 – August 2025
- President: Isaac Herzog
- Preceded by: Lironne Bar-Sadeh

Personal details
- Born: 23 August 1980 (age 46)
- Education: Bezalel Academy; Tel Aviv University

Dana Erlich (Hebrew: דנה ארליך; born 23 August 1980) is an Israeli diplomat who has been Head of Mission at the Israeli Embassy in Spain since August 2025. From 2023 to 2025 she was Israeli ambassador to Ireland succeeding Lironne Bar-Sadeh. On 22 May 2024, the Israeli Minister of Foreign Affairs, Israel Katz, recalled Israel's Ambassador to Ireland following the recognition of the state of Palestine by the Irish government. On 15 December 2024, the Israeli Minister for Foreign Affairs Gideon Sa'ar announced the closure of the Israeli embassy in Dublin following the Irish government's decision to support South Africa's genocide case against Israel in the International Court of Justice.

== Biography ==
Erlich is an Israeli of Argentinian origin. She holds a degree in Fine Art from the Bezalel Academy and a master's degree in political communication from Tel Aviv University. Following this she served as a Military Intelligence Officer in the IDF. She joined the Foreign Service in 2010 and before her appointment as Ambassador to Ireland she was Minister Counsellor for Political Affairs at the Embassy of Israel, London. She has also served in Costa Rica, the United States and as Israeli Representative of the UN Disarmament Fellowship Programme to the United Nations.

== Career ==
=== Israeli Ambassador to Ireland ===
Erlich presented her credentials to President Michael D. Higgins at a ceremony at Áras an Uachtaráin on 20 September 2023. She criticized President Higgins' for "repeating misinformation" in response to his accusation that Israel was breaking the international law and "creating a huge humanitarian crisis" in Gaza. Speaking on Taoiseach Leo Varadkar's accusation of Israel engaging in "collective punishment" of Palestinians by "cutting off power and water to the Hamas-controlled Gaza strip," she defended Israeli airstrikes on Gaza's civilian infrastructure. She blamed Hamas for the ongoing conflict when further questioned by Fran McNulty, television presenter with RTÉ, for Israel's rationale for "denying people who are being bombed the right to leave and the right to food, medicine and water.

On 15 November 2023 a Social Democrats motion proposing the expulsion of Ambassador Erlich was defeated in Dáil Éireann following a government counter-motion.

In February 2024, Catherine Connolly, who was then the Leas-Cheann Comhairle of Dáil Éireann, accused Erlich of "propagating utter propaganda" on Irish radio and called for her to appear before the Dáil to account for her statements.

In March 2024, the Garda Síochána opened an investigation into death threats against Erlich following the delivery of a package containing white powder to the Israeli Embassy in Dublin which was accompanied by graphic images of Israelis killed by Hamas on 7 October 2023, and a written threat to Erlich. The powder was later discovered to be sugar.

On 11 April 2024, in an opinion piece for the Irish Times, Erlich reported that her invitation to attend the Fine Gael Ard Fheis had been withdrawn linking this to what she described as a "contagion" of anti-Israel sentiment. She also characterised anti-Israel sentiment in Ireland as anti-semitic and questioned Ireland's neutrality. She said that Ireland's plans to recognise the State of Palestine were akin to "rewarding terrorism". The following day she claimed Israel was being discriminated against by Ireland following an announcement by Fianna Fáil that they would not be inviting the Israeli or Russian ambassadors to their Ard Fheis. Meanwhile, Micheál Martin described her comments about the recognition of Palestinian sovereignty as "absurd and unacceptable".

In May 2024, Erlich responded to the deselection of Social Democrats local election candidate, Orli Degani, a Jewish Israeli citizen born in Germany, saying that she "appears to have been discriminated against because of her nationality". She described Delgani as one of a "growing number" of Jewish and Israeli people in Ireland who feel increasingly targeted by an atmosphere of anti-Israeli sentiment. The statement was rejected by Social Democrats leader, Holly Cairns, who described the claims as "scurrilous and false" and an attempt to deflect from the "bigger, and much more important issue of the more than 34,000 people now killed in Gaza by the Israeli Government". Cairns later confirmed that the reason for Delgani's deselection was because her position on Gaza differed from that of the party.

In May 2024, Israel recalled its ambassadors from Ireland and Norway after the countries officially recognized Palestine as a state. In response, Erlich described Iran and Hamas' support for the recognition as a "prize for terrorism" and accused the Irish government for "imposing a peace process." In a subsequent interview for the Irish Times, she said that there would be "a review of bilateral relations" between Israel and Ireland.

On 25 May 2024, in an interview with the Irish Examiner, President Higgins accused Ambassador Erlich of "encouraging fear" among the Jewish community in Ireland and denounced her claims of growing anti-semitism in Ireland as "grossly irresponsible" describing it as a "PR exercise by an administration that is guilty of continuing breaches of international law".

On 7 September 2024 it was reported that Erlich would not be returning to Ireland until "relations between the two states improve substantially". On 16 September 2024, the Irish Independent published an opinion piece by Erlich to mark the first anniversary of her appointment as Ambassador. In it she reiterated her view that anti-Israel sentiment in Ireland is anti-semitic and makes several claims of an anti-Israel bias in Irish politics and media.

In an opinion piece in the Jerusalem Post on 23 September 2024, Alan Shatter, a former Irish government minister and prominent member of the Irish Jewish community, called on Minister Katz to reverse the decision to recall Erlich, describing her withdrawal as an "act of crass stupidity".

On the first anniversary of the October 7 attack on Israel, Erlich was interviewed on Irish radio station Newstalk and spoke about what she sees as the rise in anti-semitism in Ireland, claiming that "Jewish people in Ireland are afraid to speak in Hebrew or to show any physical manifestations of their identity because of a fear of retaliation". She claimed that the media in Ireland was helping to spread "baseless accusations" against Israel. Erlich also accused UNICEF of failing to call for the release of Israeli hostages. This was refuted by UNICEF Ireland executive director, Peter Power, later that week on the same show when he read out statements made by UNICEF condemning both the abduction of hostages, as well as the attacks made on Israel by Hamas.

In October 2024, Erlich described the Occupied Territories Bill proposing to ban trade between Ireland and illegal Israeli settlements occupying Palestinian territory as "a discriminatory attempt that aims to target Israel" and an "attack on the Jewish people’s legitimacy to a secure state in their ancestral homeland".

In December 2024, Israel announced that it would close its embassy in Dublin due to what it described as "the extreme anti-Israel policies of the Irish government". This decision came a week after the Irish government decided to formally intervene in South Africa's case against Israel at the International Court of Justice. South Africa alleges that Israel has committed genocide in Gaza, a claim that Israel vehemently denies. Erlich said that the decision was taken due to a "hostile atmosphere [against Israel] in Ireland, fostered by the Irish government".

In December 2024, Michael D. Higgins, President of Ireland, said that when he accepted her credentials, he initially assumed the comments were due to a lack of experience, but he “later realised the comments were part of a pattern to damage Ireland."

In January 2025, Erlich said that she would remain as ambassador until mid-2025 before taking up the post of Israeli ambassador to Slovakia, however on 25 January 2025 Professor Tom O'Dowd, Chair of Holocaust Education Ireland, said that there was, "a lot of confusion and still is confusion as to whether she is ambassador or not”. In the midst of this confusion, Erlich continued to give media interviews and make public statements, alleging that President Higgins' attendance at the 2025 National Holocaust Memorial Day commemoration in Dublin, "politicised" the event.

The Irish Department of Foreign Affairs said that notification of the closure of the embassy was received by Dublin on 20 December 2024.

=== Head of Mission at the Israeli Embassy in Spain ===
In August 2025, Erlich was appointed Head of Mission at the Israeli Embassy in Spain. In September 2025 she was summoned by the Spanish Foreign Minister José Manuel Albares following comments made by the office of the Prime Minister of Israel accusing Spain of making a "blatant genocidal threat" against Israel. The Spanish Ministry of Foreign Affairs rejected the claims as "false and slanderous". The dispute followed criticism of Israel's role in the Gaza war by Spanish Prime Minister, Pedro Sánchez.

In October 2025, Erlich accused the Spanish government of actively contributing to the rise of antisemitism, claiming that the government's position on Israel was not out of solidarity with Palestinians but was about harming Israel.

In April 2026, Erlich was again summoned by the Spanish Foreign Minister following Israel's seizure of the Gaza Freedom Flotilla and the detention of 175 activists including 31 Spanish citizens. The flotilla had set sail from Barcelona in mid-April 2026.

Also in April 2026, Erlich was forced to deny claims that Israel was considering supporting Morocco's claims over the cities of Ceuta and Melilla following reports in the Israeli media that Israel could offer diplomatic support to Morocco. The reports came amid tensions between the US and Spain following Spain's refusal to allow the US to use Spanish military bases for operations linked to the US/Israeli war with Iran.
