= Kyle O'Sullivan =

Irish diplomat

Ireland's Ambassador to Israel
- In office August 2019 – November 2022
- Preceded by: Alison Kelly
- Succeeded by: Sonya McGuinness

Ireland's Ambassador to Indonesia
- In office 2014–2018
- Preceded by: Olivia Leslie

Ireland's Ambassador to Nigeria
- In office 2007–2010

Personal details
- Born: Dublin, Ireland
- Education: University College, Dublin

Kyle O'Sullivan is an Irish diplomat who is currently head of the Africa Unit at Irish Aid. His previous post was as Irish ambassador to Israel.

== Early life and education ==
O'Sullivan was born in Dublin, Ireland. He was educated at Trinity College Dublin and University College Dublin.

== Career ==
O'Sullivan joined the Department of Foreign Affairs in 1993 after working for some years in Hong Kong. Before becoming ambassador to Israel served as Consular Director at the Department of Foreign Affairs and Trade in Dublin. Before that he held two ambassadorial postings in Nigeria and Indonesia and a period as Director for EU Policy in the office of the Taoiseach (Prime Minister). He has also served in other posts at home and abroad.

=== Ambassador to Nigeria ===
O'Sullivan served as Ireland's ambassador to Nigeria from 2007 to 2010.

=== Ambassador to Indonesia ===
O'Sullivan became Ireland's first ambassador to Indonesia in 2014 and served there until 2018 when he was succeeded by Olivia Leslie. O'Sullivan was ambassador to Indonesia when an earthquake struck in 2018. All of the Irish people caught up in the earthquake, over 50 in total, were accounted for.

=== Ambassador to Israel ===
In 2019 O'Sullivan became Ireland's ambassador to Israel, replacing Alison Kelly, who retired from government service. He presented his credentials to Israel's president, Reuven Rivlin, on Wednesday, August 7, 2019. He was succeeded by Sonya McGuinness in November 2022.
