= Sonya McGuinness =

Irish diplomat

Irish Ambassador to Israel
- Incumbent
- Assumed office November 2022
- President: Michael D Higgins; Catherine Connolly
- Preceded by: Kyle O'Sullivan

Irish Ambassador to Turkey (Note: At the time, the Irish Ambassador to Turkey was also accredited to Azerbaijan, Iran and Pakistan)
- In office August 2019 – November 2022
- President: Michael D Higgins
- Preceded by: Brendan Ward
- Succeeded by: John McCullagh

Sonya McGuinness is an Irish diplomat who succeeded Kyle O'Sullivan as Irish ambassador to Israel in November 2022. She presented her credentials to President Isaac Herzog in September 2023. McGuinness previously served as Irish ambassador to Turkey from 2019.

== Career ==
=== Ambassador to Israel ===
In November 2023, McGuinness was summoned to the Israeli Ministry of Foreign Affairs following comments by then Taoiseach, Leo Varadkar about the safe return of 9-year old Irish-Israeli girl, Emily Hand, who had been kidnapped by Hamas during the October 7 attacks and held hostage. In May 2024, she was again summoned to the Ministry of Foreign Affairs, along with the ambassadors of Spain and Norway, where she was reprimanded over Ireland's decision to recognise the State of Palestine. The Tánaiste and Minister for Foreign Affairs, Micheál Martin, criticised the reprimand as "totally unacceptable".

In December 2024, McGuinness responded to the closure of the Israeli embassy in Dublin, rejecting the accusation that Ireland is anti-Israel and antisemitic, and describing the depiction of Irish policy in Israel as "cartoonish".

In December 2025, McGuinness was publicly rebuked by Israeli Foreign Minister Gideon Sa'ar over a proposal by Dublin City Councillors to rename Herzog Park in Rathgar, Dublin which he claimed was anti-semitic. McGuinness warned against using accusations of anti-semitism for political gain and accused the Minister of being "ill-informed".
