= Lironne Bar-Sadeh =

Israeli diplomat

H.E. Ms Lironne Bar-Sadeh
- לירון בר-שדה
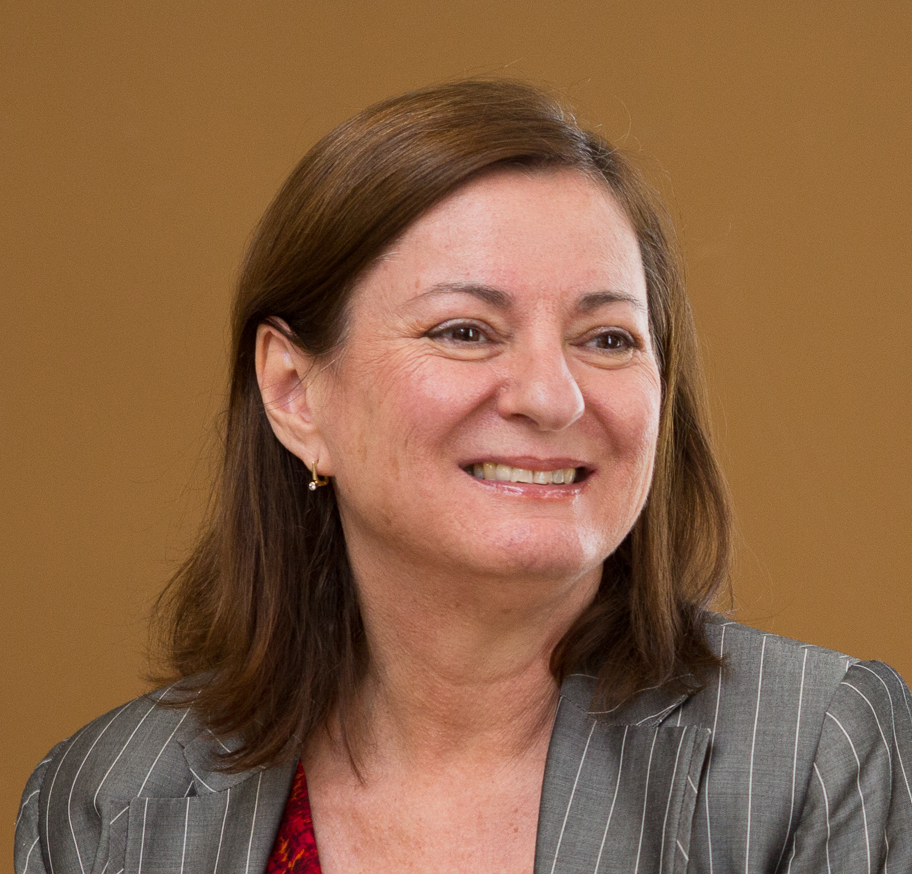

Israeli Ambassador to Ireland
- In office June 2021 – August 2023
- President: Isaac Herzog
- Preceded by: Ophir Kariv
- Succeeded by: Dana Erlich

Israeli Ambassador to Latvia
- In office 2015 – 2019
- President: Reuven Rivlin
- Preceded by: Hagit Ben-Yaakov
- Succeeded by: Orli Gil

Personal details
- Born: 29 April 1959 (age 67) Southern Rhodesia
- Spouse: Ofer Bar-Sadeh
- Education: Hebrew University of Jerusalem

Lironne Bar-Sadeh (Hebrew: לירון בר-שדה) also known as Lironne Bar-Sade (born 29 April 1959) is an Israeli diplomat who has served as ambassador to Latvia and to Ireland. She previously served as Deputy Head of Mission at the Israeli Embassies in Italy and Jordan.

== Biography ==
Bar-Sadeh was born in what is now Zimbabwe in 1959 and emigrated to Israel in 1961. She holds a BA in Hebrew and English Literature and an MA in Hebrew Literature from Hebrew University of Jerusalem and has worked for the Israeli Ministry of Foreign Affairs since 1992, when she was appointed First Secretary and Cultural Attaché at the Israeli Embassy to Belgium and Luxembourg. Bar-Sadeh was appointed ambassador to Latvia in 2015 and ambassador to Ireland in 2021 where she was succeeded by Dana Erlich in 2023. She is married to Ofer Bar-Sadeh and has two children.

== Career ==
=== Israeli Ambassador to Ireland ===
Shortly after her appointment as ambassador to Ireland, Bar-Sadeh spoke out against the Boycott, Divestment and Sanctions (BDS) movement and criticised comments by author Sally Rooney who had declined an offer from an Israeli publisher to translate her novel Beautiful World, Where Are You into Hebrew, citing her support for the BDS movement. Rooney had described Israel as an apartheid state, referring to a 2021 report by Human Rights Watch.

In 2022, a senior Sinn Féin politician criticised Bar-Sadeh's presence at the St. Patrick's Day Festival in Limerick. Senator Paul Gavan described her presence as a "disgraceful decision", and repeated his party's calls for the ambassador to be expelled from the state. Bar-Sadeh responded by accusing Gavan of promoting his own agenda through manipulative language. She had been invited to the event as a guest of the then Polish ambassador to Ireland, Anna Sochańska. Her attendance was also criticised by the Ireland Palestine Solidarity Campaign and People Before Profit.
