= Zeev Boker =

Israeli diplomat

- זאב בוקר

Israeli Ambassador to Ireland
- In office 2015 – October 16, 2018
- Preceded by: Boaz Moda'i
- Succeeded by: Ophir Kariv

Personal details
- Profession: Diplomat

Zeev Boker (Hebrew: זאב בוקר) was the ambassador of Israel to Malta as well as Israel's ambassador to Slovenia. He previously served as the counsel general of Israel to New England from October 2018 to March 2020. He was Israel's sixth Ambassador to Ireland and its first Ambassador to Slovakia.

== Early life ==
Boker was born and spent his early life on Kibbutz Afek in the North of Israel. His parents had both been born in Poland and emigrated to Israel. When they met and married in their new homeland, they moved to the kibbutz and raised their three children there. Boker earned a master's degree in political science (cum laude) from the Hebrew University in Jerusalem.

== Career ==
He has served as a diplomat since November 1987, when he joined the Ministry of Foreign affairs as a cadet.

He became the first Israeli ambassador to Slovakia (2006–2010). He also served in Prague as deputy chief of mission (1990–1993) and deputy Chief of mission in the Netherlands (1997–2003). He then became ambassador to Ireland.

In his role in New England, Boker also potential in for cooperation between the U.S. and Israel in the areas of academics and medicine, particularly digital health.

While Ambassador to Ireland, Boker was scheduled to speak at Trinity College Dublin. Pro-Palestinian students protested. The event was cancelled when police and University security were unable to remove the protestors. The college considered the protestors to be attacking free speech.

== Personal ==
Boker is married to Tali, a physician and manager of the Israeli Center for Disease Control. They have three children.
