= Boaz Moda'i =

- בועז מודעי

Israeli Ambassador to Slovakia
- Incumbent
- Assumed office 2019
- Preceded by: Zvi Aviner Vapni

Israeli Ambassador to Ireland
- In office September 2010 – September 2015
- Preceded by: Zion Evrony
- Succeeded by: Zeev Boker

Personal details
- Spouse: Nurit Tinari Modai
- Profession: Diplomat

Boaz Moda'i (also Boaz Modai, Hebrew: בועז מודעי) is an Israeli diplomat. He was Israel's ambassador to Ireland from 2010 to 2015.

== Biography ==
Boaz Moda'i is the son of Yitzhak Moda'i, an Israeli politician. His mother, Michal Har'el, was the second Miss Israel, crowned in 1951, later an honorary life president of the Women's International Zionist Organization.

== Diplomatic career ==
Modai joined Israel's foreign ministry in 1988. He has served in Israeli embassies in Guatemala, Honduras, Thailand, and London. He served as first counselor of Israel's Embassy to the Holy See. In that role he acted as political co-ordinator for the visit of Pope John Paul II to Israel in 2000. Before moving to Dublin, he spent six years in the Training Bureau of Israel's Ministry of Foreign Affairs in Jerusalem.

After becoming ambassador to Ireland, he was joined in his work by his wife, Nurit Tinari-Modai (Nurit Tinari Modai), who served as Deputy Head of Mission. Under their leadership the Israeli Embassy in Dublin was criticized for diplomatic faux pas on social media accounts. They were accused of adopting a "provocative" approach to diplomacy that has been embarrassing to the embassy. Tinari-Modai, in particular was criticized for allegedly describing Israeli human rights activists as suffering from "problems of sexual identity" and recommending publishing photographs which might cause them embarrassment. The Ireland Palestine Solidarity Campaign called for Israel to withdraw Tinari-Modai from the embassy.

The embassy won an award for its online hasbara from the Comper Center for the Study of Antisemitism and Racism at University of Haifa. On 31 December 2013, the university's website noted: "The annual appreciation for extraordinary hasbara activity was granted today … to Israel's ambassador to Ireland, Boaz Modai, and his deputy, Nurit Tinari-Modai, by the unique academic program 'Ambassadors Online,' which trains students for pro-Israel hasbara activity online." It lauded them for "activity in the struggle against those who promote the economic-cultural boycott of Israel and against anti-Semitic agents," and credited them with "exposing Israeli culture and the variety of Israel's tourist locations and technological achievements to the residents of Ireland."

On 16 October 2019 Moda'i presented his credentials to president Zuzana Čaputová to become ambassador to Slovakia.

== Controversy ==
While he was Head of the Instruction Branch in the Israeli Ministry of Foreign Affairs, Moda'i was investigated by police after a former employee complained of receiving harassing phone calls from an unidentified number. Police traced the phone number to Moda'i, who said the woman had spread rumors that he was having an affair. The Jerusalem police issued a restraining order and recommended that Moda'i be prosecuted.

The Moda'i couple was accused of inappropriate social media postings.

- "If Jesus and mother Mary were alive today, they would, as Jews without security, probably end up being lynched in Bethlehem by hostile Palestinians." Illustrated by an icon of Jesus of the Sacred Heart and Virgin Mary with the heart pierced by a sword. During Christmas season, on Embassy Facebook posting, 17 December 2012. The Times of Israel reported that "some people demanded the ambassador in Dublin be fired", while the Foreign Ministry said it would "conduct an internal investigation."
- A posting linked to an article stating "The UN has itself become a tool against Israel. Hitler couldn’t have been made happier." Embassy Facebook and Twitter posting, 6 August 2013.
- Mona Lisa wearing a hijab and holding a rocket, with the words "Israel now, Paris later,"
- Palestinian flag with superimposed photo of Adolf Hitler and the text "Free Palestine – Now!" and message "Hamas take lead from Hitler".
- - Israel's Channel 10 TV station published an email sent by Tinari Moda'i to senior Foreign Ministry officials suggesting that Israeli expats living in Ireland who were critical of Israel had psychological and sexual identity problems: "We can find names of [those] Israelis… we should hit their soft spot, publish their pictures, maybe it will embarrass their friends and relatives at home, and hopefully the local [Palestinian] activists will think that they work for the Mossad… The acts of these activists are, I think, not ideologically motivated, but rather have to do with psychological reasons (disappointment with their parents or problems with their sexual identity) or due to their need to receive a residence permit (refugee visa) in one of the European countries…"

Modai complained to the Office of the Press Ombudsman against The Irish Times, claiming its coverage of Israel violated principles of press code of conduct. In one complaint, Modai asserted that an interview with Gideon Levy of Haaretz published by the Irish Times did not question what he had said. Modai protested that the headline was "anti-Semitic and insulting to the State of Israel and its people."
