= Herzog Park =

Public park in Dublin, Ireland

- Orwell Quarry Park (former name)
- Páirc Herzog
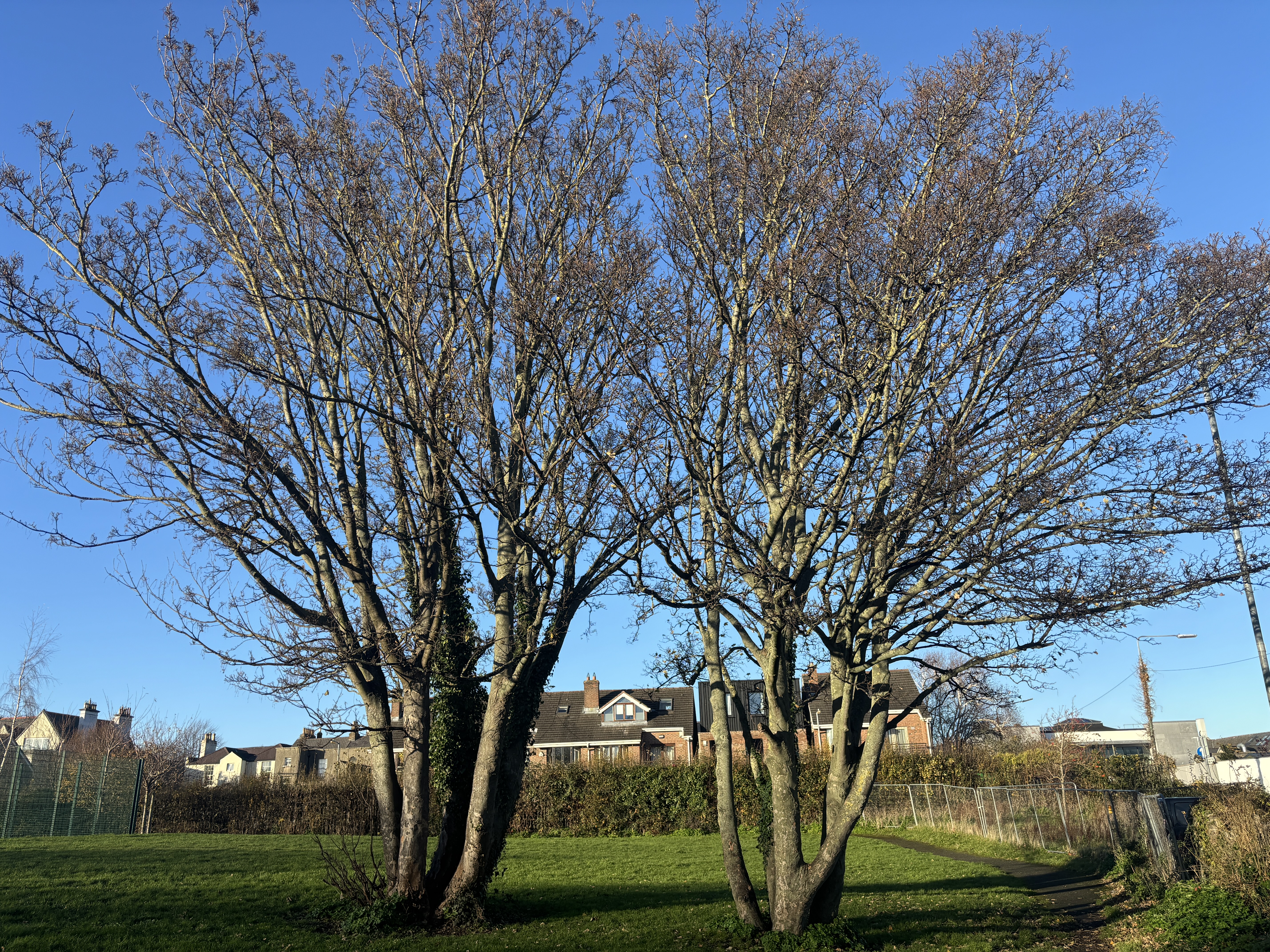
- Trees at Herzog Park, Rathgar, Dublin
- Interactive map of Herzog Park
- Location: Rathgar, Dublin, Ireland
- Coordinates: 53°18′37″N 6°16′32″W
- Owner: Dublin City Council

Herzog Park (Irish: Páirc Herzog) is a small public park in Rathgar, Dublin, Ireland. Named for Chaim Herzog, sixth President of Israel, who grew up in Dublin, it occupies the site of a former stone quarry and was laid out as a neighbourhood park in the 1980s. It contains some trees, a children's playground, a bring centre for household recycling and the grounds of Rathgar Tennis Club.

== History and location ==
The park lies just southwest of the centre of Rathgar, off Orwell Road, in Dublin 6. It is one of several small parks in the Rathgar and Terenure area administered by Dublin City Council's Parks and Landscape Services.

The city council (then known as Dublin Corporation) acquired the site, an in-filled quartz and limestone quarry, in 1954 on a long-term lease. The modern park was set out in 1985 by the municipal Parks Department, and was first known as Orwell Quarry Park. It includes some light woodland.

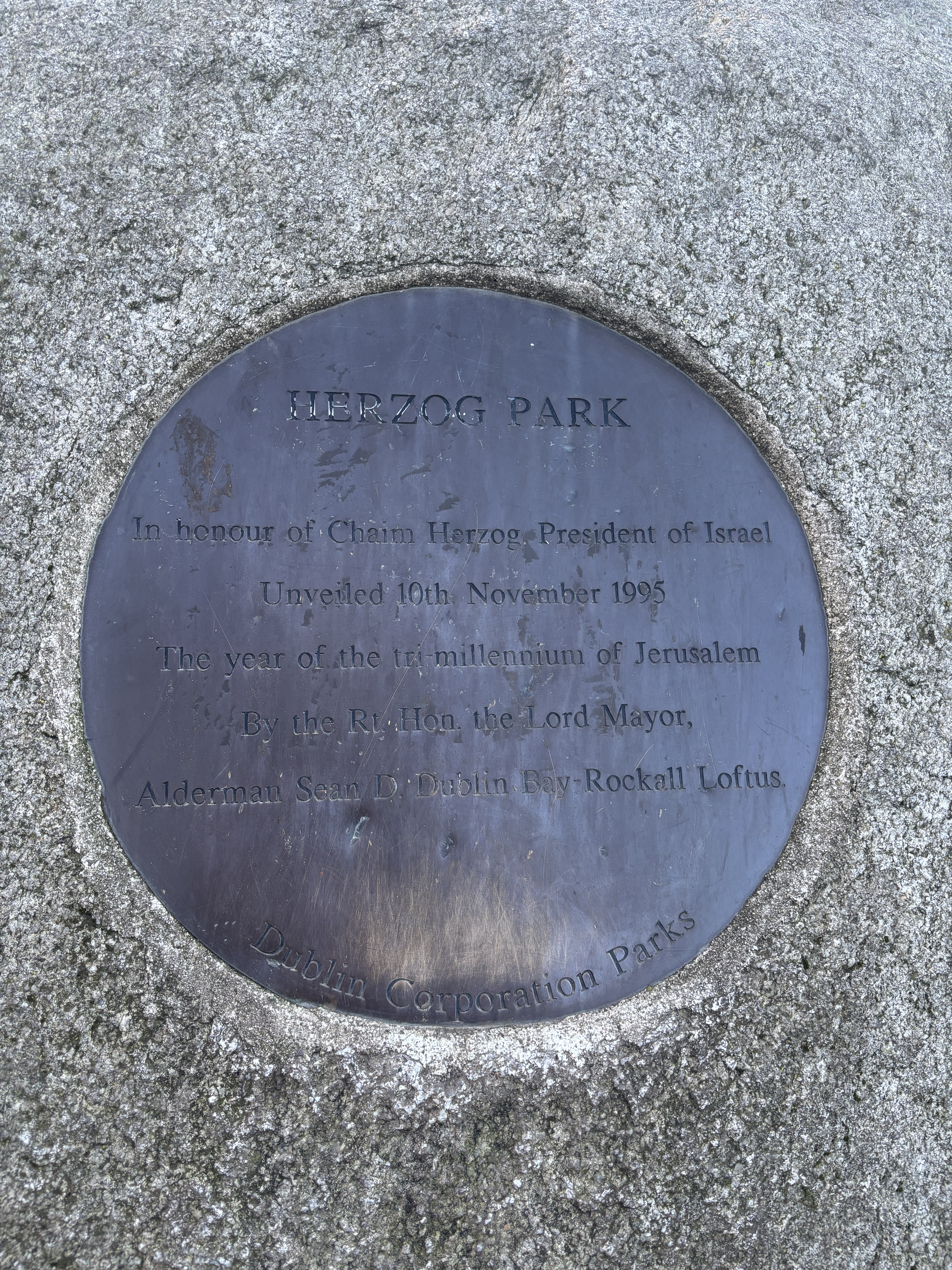
Naming plaque for Chaim Herzog (and Jerusalem's Tri-Millennium) at Herzog Park, Rathgar, Dublin

The park was renamed in 1995 in honour of Major-General Chaim Herzog, President of Israel, who was born in Belfast but grew up in Dublin. His father, Yitzhak HaLevi Herzog, a figure associated with Irish nationalism, served as chief rabbi of Ireland. The renaming of the park followed a request from the Municipality of Jerusalem in October 1994 asking that Dublin name a street, square or park to mark the tri-millennium of the City of David. The park was opened by the Lord Mayor of Dublin, Seán Loftus.

The park is situated next to the shared campus of Ireland's only Jewish-founded schools, Stratford College and Stratford National School. These were established by the Dublin Jewish Community, and are both under the patronage of the Dublin Talmud Torah. It is close to the historical heart of the Jewish community in Dublin. Number 1 Zion Road, which forms part of the school buildings, was also named Herzog House in dedication to Chaim Herzog.

Events hosted at the park include a Hanukkah ceremony, held in December 2025, which was attended by Ireland's chief Rabbi Yoni Wieder and Justice Minister Jim O'Callaghan.

== Facilities ==
Herzog Park has a children's playground and is also the location of a recycling centre. It has a small car park for visitors.

The park is also home to Rathgar Tennis Club. Established in 1986, the club has 10 all-weather floodlit tennis courts, a tennis wall and a clubhouse.

== Naming controversy ==
A campaign to remove Chaim Herzog's name from the park was started in July 2024 by Irish Sport for Palestine and other groups, and supported by Irish Jews for Palestine. This contributed to a vote in a Dublin City Council committee in 2025, and in late November 2025, the park became the focus of international attention as the council prepared to vote on a motion to "de-name" it, pending discussion of a new name. Some members of the council committee which recommended the de-naming defended their position as not antisemitic, commenting, for example, that "there is no intention ... to offend anyone in the Jewish community" and "there is a very significant history of the Jewish community in Dublin and Ireland, and a very positive history. Many played a positive role in the struggle for independence ... I don't think this [name] change in any way diminishes that". At least two of those voting for the change in committee later reversed their positions, stating that they would vote against it in full council session.

Yoni Wieder, the Chief Rabbi of Ireland, wrote an opinion piece in The Irish Times, referring to the park's significance and the lack of consultation about the proposed change; he further commented about the area's Jewish history and said that the park was "a place filled with memory, and an important reminder that our community has deep roots in Dublin". Isaac Herzog, sitting President of Israel and son of Chaim Herzog, said denaming would be a "shameful and disgraceful move", while Mike Huckabee, US ambassador to Israel, described the proposed change as an "incredible insult to the Herzog family whose roots are deep in Ireland". The Jewish Representative Council of Ireland called the denaming "deeply concerning" because it could be viewed as "an attempt to erase Ireland’s Jewish history."

Taoiseach Micheál Martin and Tánaiste Simon Harris expressed their opposition to denaming the park. Martin stated that the proposal "should be withdrawn in its entirety and not proceeded with" and said it would be seen as anti-semitic. Harris posted on social media that "It is wrong. We are an inclusive Republic. This proposal is offensive to that principle". Local Teachta Dála and Minister for Justice, Jim O'Callaghan, stated that the "park was named after him [Chaim Herzog] 30 years ago to acknowledge his connection with Ireland and the important role played by Jewish people in Dublin's history. Renaming the park because of the slaughter in Gaza is unfair to him and unfairly suggests Irish Jews are responsible for the appalling actions of the current Israeli Government". Minister for Foreign Affairs and Trade and Defence, Helen McEntee, stated that the proposal had "no place in our inclusive republic".

A proposal to rename the park after Hind Rajab, a Palestinian child killed by Israeli forces during the Israel invasion of Gaza, was excluded due to a policy, adopted by the council in 2017, requiring nominees to be dead for at least 20 years before being considered. Other proposed names included Gaza Park, Palestine Park and Max Levitas Park after an Irish-born anti-fascist activist of Jewish heritage.

The chief executive of Dublin City Council stated on 30 November that consideration of de-naming would be postponed, as a number of steps for such a proposal, including consultation with the public, had not been followed. It was later clarified that the formal process to change the names of streets and parks in Ireland is not operational as of 2025, as while the relevant legislation was passed in 2011 and brought into force in 2019, enabling regulations have not yet been made.

In June 2026, five councillors from Dublin City Council lodged papers to initiate judicial review proceedings against Minister James Browne over the Department of Housing, Local Government and Heritage's failure to legislate properly for renaming of parks. The action is in response to the failure to rename Herzog Park and to rename Dublin's Diamond Park in honour of Terence Wheelock, who died in September 2005 from injuries received while in police custody earlier that year. The councillors include Conor Reddy, People Before Profit, Independents Cieran Perry and Vincent Jackson, and Sinn Féin's Ciarán Ó Meachair and Mícheál Mac Donncha. The department cited "legislative complexities" between the Local Government Act 2001 and the Official Languages Act 2003 which they said may require primary legislation to resolve.
