= Eamonn McKee =

Irish diplomat

Eamonn C. McKee was an Irish diplomat, and ambassador to the republic of Korea, the DPRK, Israel, Canada, Jamaica, The Bahamas, and Antigua and Barbuda.

McKee was born in Dublin. He studied at University College Dublin, and went on to receive a PhD in 1987 for his thesis on Irish economic policy 1939-52 from the National University of Ireland. McKee joined the Department of Foreign Affairs in 1986 where he began the first of three periods of service in Anglo-Irish Division. He was first posted to the Embassy in Washington between 1990 and 1996. From 1999 to 2001 he served as a press officer at the Irish Consulate in New York.

After serving as head of the Justice and Security Section of Anglo-Irish Division, he was appointed head of Emergency and Recovery Section of Irish Aid in 2005.In 2006 he was appointed UN Director and Director of the Conflict Resolution Unit.

In August 2009 he was appointed as ambassador of Ireland to South Korea and to Israel in 2013. In 2015 he returned to headquarters to serve as Director of the Trade Division.

He served as ambassador to Canada between 2020 and 2024.

McKee was a member of the talks team involved in the negotiation of the Good Friday Agreement of 1998 and later involved in its implementation.
