= Holy See–Palestine relations =

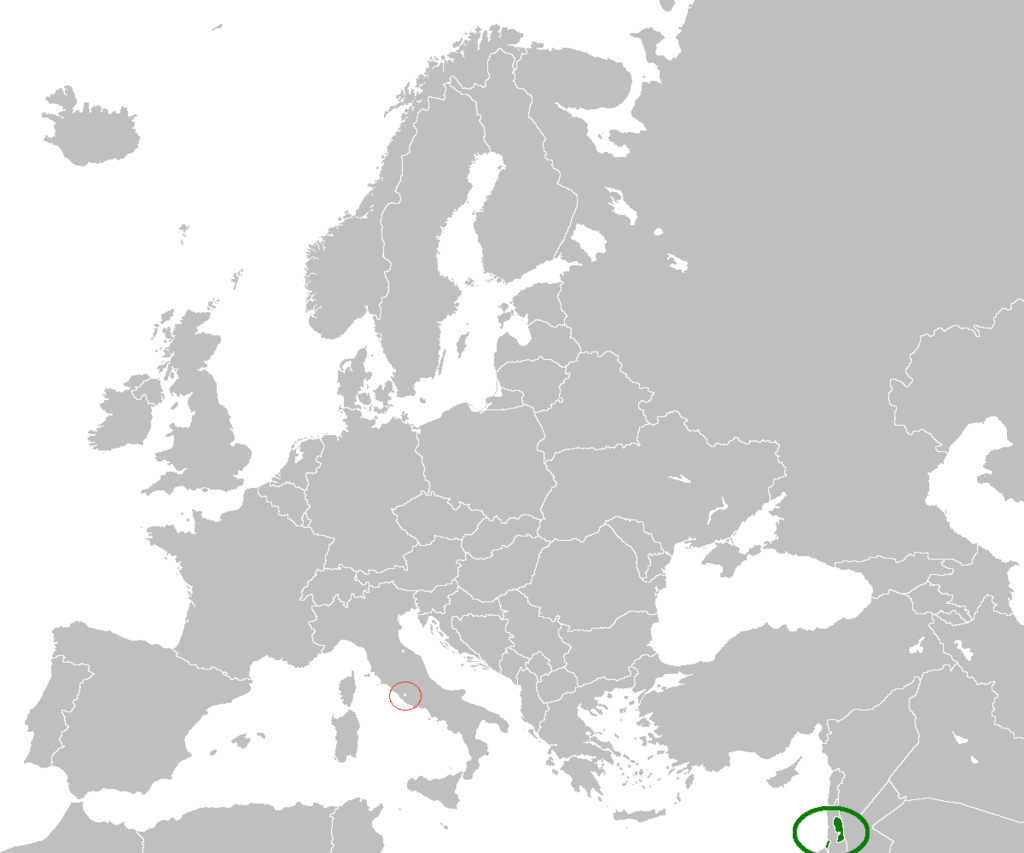

- Palestine: Holy See

The Holy See and the State of Palestine established formal diplomatic relations in 2015 through the mutual signing of the Comprehensive Agreement between the Holy See and the State of Palestine. In 2017, a Palestinian embassy to the Holy See was opened.

The Holy See had maintained relations with Palestine (which the Vatican calls the Holy Land) since 11 February 1948, when the Holy See created the office of Apostolic Delegate to Jerusalem and Palestine, with jurisdiction over Palestine, Transjordania (now Jordan), and Cyprus. In Vatican City usage, an Apostolic Delegate is a representative of Vatican City in a country with which the Holy See has no diplomatic ties, and who is not accredited to the government of the country. The Delegate also acts as a liaison with the Catholic Church in that country.

Archbishop Andrea Cordero Lanza di Montezemolo, who had been Apostolic Delegate to Jerusalem and Palestine since 1990, was also appointed the first Apostolic Nuncio to Israel after relations were established between Israel and the Holy See in 1994. Since 1994, the Nuncios to Israel have held simultaneous appointments as Nuncio to Cyprus and Apostolic Delegates to Jerusalem and Palestine. The Nunciature to Israel is located in Tel Aviv. Since 3 June 2021, Adolfo Tito Yllana has been Apostolic Nuncio to Israel and Apostolic Delegates to Jerusalem and Palestine.

The Holy See and the PLO entered into a basic agreement in 2000, and in 2015 the Holy See and the Palestinian Authority entered into the Comprehensive Agreement between the Holy See and the State of Palestine to formulate the relationship of the Holy See and the State of Palestine. The Israeli-Palestinian conflict and Israeli control of most of the West Bank territory are the major focus of these agreements. On 25 January 2017, the Palestinian embassy to the Holy See was opened, and Issa Kassissieh was appointed Ramallah's ambassador to the Holy See.

== Background ==
Before the creation of the office of Apostolic Delegate, the Custodian of the Holy Land, which has had a presence in the Holy Land since after the Crusader period, and by the Latin Patriarch of Jerusalem, which was re-instituted in 1847, represented the interests of the Vatican in the region.

On 11 February 1948, the Holy See established the office of Apostolic Delegate to Jerusalem and Palestine, with jurisdiction over Palestine, Transjordania (now Jordan), and Cyprus. When the Holy See established diplomatic relations with Israel in 1994, the Apostolic Delegate to Jerusalem and Palestine was concurrently appointed Apostolic Nuncio to Israel and Nuncio to Cyprus.

In 1987, Michel Sabbah became the first native Palestinian to be appointed Latin Patriarch. His successor in 2008 was Fouad Twal from Jordan.

== Ecumenical relations ==
On 31 October 2016, with Pope Francis, head of the Catholic Church and sovereign of the Vatican City State and president of the Lutheran World Federation, Bishop Munib Younan from Evangelical Lutheran Church in Jordan and the Holy Land signed the Joint Statemant commemorating the Reformation Day and Historical Reconciliation between the Lutheran and Roman Catholic Churches. The co-hosted service was the first of its kind in 500 years.

== Pius XII ==
During the proposals for a resolution of the Palestinian question by partition, the Holy See expressed support for the status of corpus separatum for Jerusalem. Pope Pius XII’s official attitude in the 1948 Arab–Israeli War was one of impartiality.

On 24 October 1948, at a time when the 1948 Arab–Israeli War was still raging, but after Israel went on the offensive in Operation Yoav, Pope Pius issued encyclical In multiplicibus curis, which called for the protection of the Holy Places, and called for peace and mutual respect by the combatants. Though continuing to maintain an attitude of impartiality, the Pope also looked for possibilities for justice and peace in the Holy Land. The Pope repeated his call for Jerusalem and its outskirts be given an international character, which would "offer a better guarantee for the protection of the sanctuaries".

Immediately following the cessation of fighting in the 1948 Arab–Israeli War, in April 1949 Pope Pius repeated his call for the internationalization of Jerusalem in encyclical Redemptoris nostri cruciatus, which focused on the situation in Palestine. The concept was later re-proposed during the papacies of John XXIII, Paul VI and John Paul II. Palestinian leaders have opposed any partition of Palestine, with the support of the Arab League.

== John XXIII ==
In April 1963, Pope John XXIII issued encyclical Pacem in terris on peace in the world, which has sometimes been re-read and re-interpreted by Christians in the context of politics in the Holy Land.

== Paul VI ==
Pope Paul VI visited the Holy Land in January 1964, and called for new, important and creative initiatives on behalf of Palestinians and the Catholic Church in Palestine. On 25 March 1974, he issued encyclical Nobis in animo which is concerned with the security and survival of the Christian community in the Holy Land.

== John Paul II ==
In 1987, Pope John Paul II met with Yasser Arafat, Chairman of the Palestine Liberation Organization (PLO) since 1969, and generally supported greater rights for Palestinians. Pope John Paul was an advocate of the 1990s peace negotiations.

In 1999, on a visit to Bethlehem, he reaffirmed what he said was the Palestinians' "natural right to a homeland." On 15 February 2000, the Holy See concluded a basic agreement with the PLO, as representative of the Palestinian people and on behalf of the Palestinian Authority, which committed the PLO and PA to respect freedom of religion in general, as well as freedom of action for Catholic communities and establishments under Palestinian control. In August 2001, Pope John Paul met Arafat for the 10th time and the Pope again expressed support for the rights of the Palestinians, and called for an end to the violence in the Middle East. Vatican City continued to want an international status for Jerusalem.

== Benedict XVI ==
Pope Benedict XVI visited Jordan and the Palestine Authority in 2009, although the trip had been put in doubt because of the ongoing infighting in the Gaza Strip. Pope Benedict paid special attention to the sufferings of people in the Holy Land, especially the Palestinian people. In May 2009, Benedict expressed support for a two-state solution of the Israeli–Palestinian conflict.

On 24 October 2010, the final statement by the Synod of Bishops chaired by Benedict referred to "the necessary legal steps to put an end to the occupation of the different Arab territories", going on to say "Recourse to theological and biblical positions which use the word of God to wrongly justify injustices is not acceptable". It was well received by Palestinian diplomats, chief Palestinian negotiator Saeb Erekat stating, "we join the synod in their call to the international community to uphold the universal values of freedom, dignity and justice." Israel's Deputy Foreign Minister Danny Ayalon said that "The synod was hijacked by an anti-Israel majority".

On 27 December 2012, the pope in a meeting with Palestinian president Abbas made an official endorsement of the UN General Assembly resolution which recognized Palestine as a non-member observer state.

== Francis ==
Pope Francis visited the Palestinian Authority in May 2014 and expressed sympathy to the Palestinian cause. In May 2015, Palestinian president Mahmoud Abbas visited Vatican City. On 13 May 2015, Vatican City announced the intention to sign its first treaty with the State of Palestine after formally recognizing it as a state in February 2013. The Comprehensive Agreement between the Holy See and the State of Palestine was signed on 26 June 2015. Abbas visited the Vatican in January 2017, to open the Palestinian embassy to the Holy See.

On 31 October 2016, with Pope Francis, head of the Catholic Church and sovereign of the Vatican City State and president of the Lutheran World Federation, Bishop Munib Younan from Evangelical Lutheran Church in Jordan and the Holy Land signed the Joint Statement commemorating the Reformation Day and Historical Reconciliation between the Lutheran and Roman Catholic Churches. The co-hosted service was the first of its kind in 500 years.

At the same time Pope Francis was conducting a ceremony in the building next door in the upper room of King David's Tomb.

Pope Francis and the Vatican generally condemned Israel's military operation in the Gaza during the 2023–present war, leading to complaints from Israel's government. Throughout the war, Francis has called for an immediate ceasefire, the release of all hostages, and a two-state solution. Francis described the killing of Nahida and Samar Anton as "terrorism". In 2024, Pope Francis suggested that the international community should study whether Israel's campaign in Gaza is a genocide of the Palestinian people. On December 7, 2024, Pope Francis dedicated a nativity scene in the Vatican where baby Jesus was lying on a Keffiyeh, the traditional Arab scarf. This incident was interpreted as a gesture towards the Palestinians.

== Leo XIV ==
In 2025, Pope Leo XIV spoke in favor of establishing a Palestinian state.

== See also ==
- Index of Vatican City-related articles
- Holy See-Israel relations
- International recognition of Palestine
- Catholic Church in Palestine
- Catholic Church and Islam
- Palestinian Christians
- Statement on the 500th anniversary of the Protestant Reformation
