= Marie-Alphonsine Danil Ghattas =

Palestinian Christian nun (1843–1927)

Saint Marie-Alphonsine Danil Ghattas O.P.
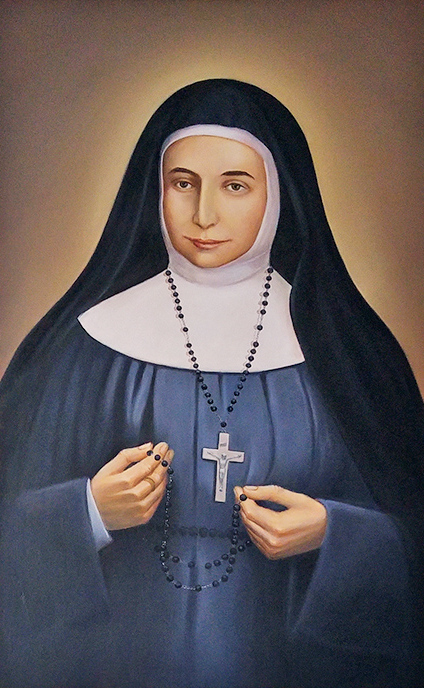

Virgin
- Born: Soultaneh Maria Ghattas; 4 October 1843; Jerusalem, Ottoman Empire
- Died: 25 March 1927 (aged 83); Ein Karem, Mandatory Palestine
- Venerated in: Catholic Church
- Beatified: 22 November 2009, Basilica of the Annunciation, Nazareth by Angelo Amato
- Canonized: 17 May 2015, Saint Peter's Square, Vatican City by Pope Francis
- Feast: 25 March
- Attributes: Religious habit; Rosary
- Patronage: Dominican Sisters of the Most Holy Rosary of Jerusalem

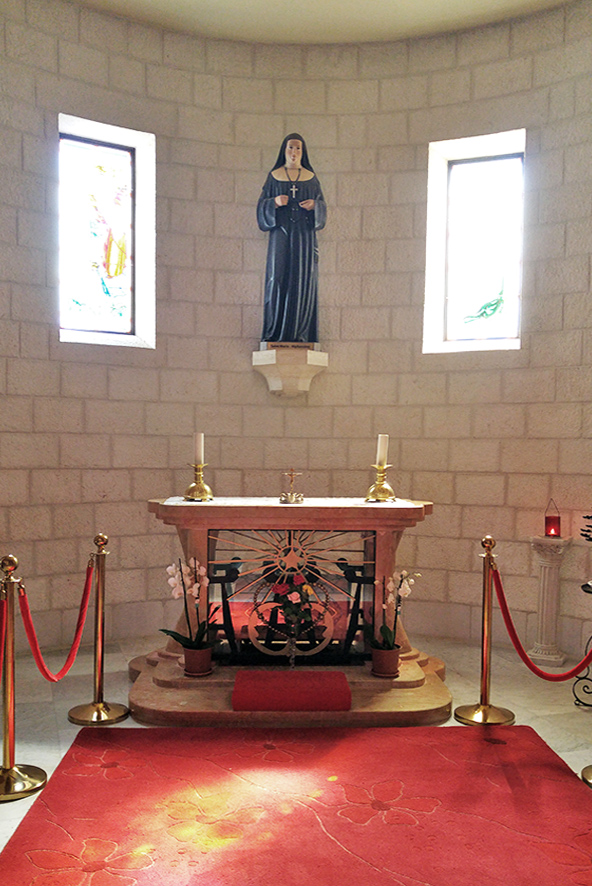
Marie-Alphonsine's remains in the Rosary Sisters' convent in Jerusalem

Marie-Alphonsine Danil Ghattas, OP (4 October 1843 – 25 March 1927) was a Palestinian Catholic nun who founded the Dominican Sisters of the Most Holy Rosary of Jerusalem (the Rosary Sisters), the first Palestinian religious congregation. She was beatified by Archbishop Angelo Amato on behalf of Pope Benedict XVI in 2009. On 6 December 2014, Pope Francis recognized a miracle that had been attributed to her intercession, a requirement for her canonization. The date of her canonization was announced on 14 February 2015, and she was canonized on 17 May 2015.

== Life ==
Born Soultaneh Maria Ghattas (Arabic: سلطانة ماري غطاس) on 4 October 1843 to a Palestinian family in Jerusalem, she spent her whole life working among the poor of Palestine. Her early education was at a school in Jerusalem founded by the Sisters of St Joseph of the Apparition. At the age of 9, she received the sacrament of Confirmation. When she was 14, Ghattas joined the Congregation of St. Joseph of the Apparition as a postulant. Just before her 17th birthday, she received the holy habit of the Religious of St. Joseph of the Apparition and the name, Marie-Alphonsine. In 1862, after her vows, she was sent to teach catechism in Bethlehem. There she also established religious associations promoting devotion to Mary through the Rosary.

In Bethlehem, she received several apparitions of Mary directing her to found a Palestinian congregation known as the "Sisters of the Rosary." In 1880 seven young girls prepared by Joseph Tannous, priest of the Latin Patriarchate of Jerusalem, received the religious habit of the new foundation from the hands of Patriarch Bracco. That same year, Ghattas received a dispensation from Rome to leave the community of the Sisters of St. Joseph and entered the new congregation. She received the habit from the hands of Bishop Pascal Appodia, auxiliary and patriarchal vicar, on the feast of Our Lady of the Rosary, 7 October 1883. On 7 March 1885, together with eight other sisters, she professed her final vows in the new order in the presence of the Latin Patriarch of Jerusalem, Vincent Bracco.

Ghattas dedicated her life to parish ministry and the care and education of Palestinian girls, and the community quickly grew. In 1886 she founded a school for girls in Beit Sahour. Then she was sent to Salt in Transjordan with three sisters, then to Nablus, before returning to Jerusalem due to deteriorating health. After having recovered, she went to the house of Zababdeh. In 1917, she founded an orphanage in Ein Karem. She died there on the Feast of the Annunciation, on 25 March 1927.

== Beatification ==
The rite of beatification was presided over by Archbishop Angelo Amato, Prefect of the Congregation for the Causes of Saints, and special envoy of Pope Benedict XVI, at a Mass celebrated by Patriarch Fouad Twal, Latin Patriarch of Jerusalem, on 22 November 2009 at the Church of the Annunciation in Nazareth.

Pope Francis approved a second miracle to her on 6 December 2014 and canonized her on 17 May 2015. The ceremony was attended by more than 2,000 Christian pilgrims from the Middle East and by Palestinian President Mahmoud Abbas. Four days before the canonization of Marie-Alphonsine Danil Ghattas, the Vatican announced a treaty that reaffirms recognition of Palestinian statehood, establishing formal diplomatic relations between the Holy See and the Palestinian Authority. The members of the order she founded run schools, catechetical programs, clinics, and orphanages throughout the Middle East.

== See also ==
- Mariam Baouardy
- Palestinian Christians
