= Chronology of the Second Vatican Council =

This chronology of the Second Vatican Council covers the Second Vatican Council during the period from 11 October 1962 to 8 December 1965.

== First period: 11 October – 8 December 1962 ==
=== Opening day ===
John XXIII opened the council on 11 October 1962 in a public session at St. Peter's Basilica and delivered his opening address Gaudet Mater Ecclesia ("Mother Church Rejoices") before the Council Fathers and representatives of 86 governments or international groups. He criticized the "prophets of doom who are always forecasting disaster" for the church or world. He spoke of the advantage of separation of Church and state but also the challenge to integrate faith with public life.

=== Commissions ===
The first working session of the council was on 13 October 1962. That day's agenda included the election of members of the 10 conciliar commissions. Each was to have 16 members elected by the Council Fathers and 8 – later 9 – members appointed by the Pope. Most bishops knew very few bishops other than those from their own country, and so did not know whom to vote for. They had been provided with a list of the bishops who had served on the preparatory commissions, as if to suggest that they elect the same people to the conciliar commissions, with the result that Curial forces would dominate the conciliar commissions as they had dominated the preparatory commissions. As the voting was about to begin, Cardinal Liénart, the senior French bishop, rose and proposed that the election be delayed for a few days to allow each national group of bishops to meet and draw up a list of its own members who might be suitable candidates. Cardinal Frings, the senior German bishop, rose to second the motion. There was loud applause and the motion was declared carried. That day's sitting was adjourned after only 15 minutes.

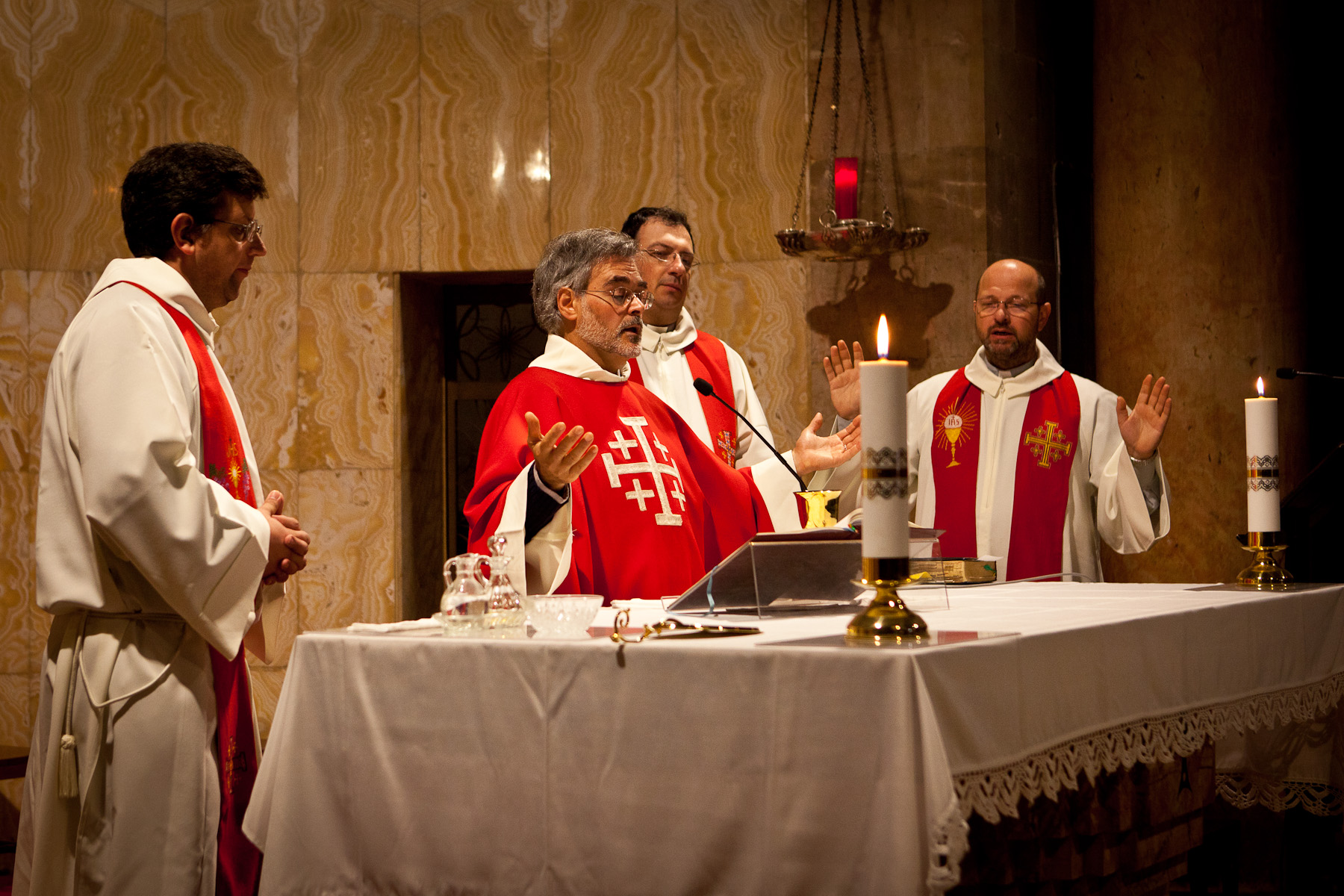
A contemporary Mass in modern practice, as versus populum became the common posture and gesture practised after the council. The priest faces the congregation, while vestments and artwork are less ornate.

For the next few days, Council Fathers met in national groups and drew up lists of candidates. The bishops from the 5 European countries (France, Belgium, the Netherlands, Germany and Austria) that spearheaded the renewal movement decided to create a single list, to which a number of renewal-minded bishops from other countries were added, for a total of 109 names. The election took place on 16 October. It brought in new blood: 79 of these 109 were elected to a commission seat and 50% of the members of the very important doctrinal commission were among these 79. In addition 43% of the newly elected commission members had not been on any preparatory commission. This was a first success for renewal.

=== Liturgy schema ===
On 22 October, the first schema to be discussed was the one from the very reform-minded preparatory commission for liturgy. It had 8 chapters:

1. General Principles
2. The Eucharistic Mystery [i.e. the Mass]
3. Sacraments and sacramentals
4. The Divine Office [i.e. the Liturgy of the Hours]
5. The Liturgical Year
6. Liturgical Furnishings
7. Sacred Music
8. Sacred Art

It proposed many reforms, including active participation of the congregation, communal singing, a partial replacement of Latin by vernacular languages, communion under both kinds, concelebration, adaptation of liturgy to local cultures and a modest decentralization of liturgical authority to national episcopal conferences. The conservatives objected to all these proposals, especially to the downgrading of Latin. Debate dragged on for 15 days, before the vote was taken on whether the schema was acceptable in principle. To everyone's surprise, only 46 (out of 2,215) voted against. A second win for renewal. The schema was now returned to the liturgy commission to deal with many proposed amendments.

=== Schema on revelation ===
This schema from the preparatory theological commission took the conservative position on all questions currently being discussed by theologians. Reformers were particularly opposed to two claims: that there were revealed truths in Tradition that were not contained in Scripture and that every assertion in the Bible was free of error. The debate lasted six days. The dramatic vote on acceptance in principle came on 20 November. The question was phrased in terms of rejection: Should the schema be rejected? Yes: 1,360. No: 822. This was 102 votes short of the two-thirds majority required by Council regulations, and so the council would have to continue discussing a schema that 62% of the participants rejected. Resolution of the impasse came the next day (21 November): Pope John announced the schema would be revised by a special joint commission made up of members of the Doctrinal Commission (representing the conservative tendency) and the Secretariat for Christian Unity (representing the renewal tendency). A third victory for renewal and a crucial turning point at the council.

=== Schema on the modern means of communication ===
This innocuous schema could be boiled down to two propositions that had been said many times before: the Church must use the media to further its mission, and people must be protected against immorality and other dangers presented by the media. There was little interest in pursuing the discussion. On 27 November, the council decided the schema should contain only essential principles, leaving detailed practical matters to be dealt with after the council. The schema was accepted in principle and returned to its commission to be abridged.

=== Schema on Unity with the Eastern Orthodox ===
This schema, drafted by the preparatory commission on the Eastern Churches, was one of three texts that had been prepared on ecumenism. Conservatives thought the schema downplayed the differences between Catholics and Orthodox, while reformers complained it conceived of unity as a return of the Orthodox to the Catholic Church. The Council Fathers avoided voting on the schema at this point, and simply ordered that the schema be merged with the other two documents on Christian unity.

=== Schema on the Church ===
On 1 December, discussion began on the schema everyone was waiting for, that on the Church. There was only one week left before the scheduled end of the First Session. The schema embodied the legalistic view of the Church to be found in current theology manuals. Some important claims: the Church of Christ is identical with the Roman Catholic Church; bishops have no authority over the universal Church except by participation in the universal authority of the pope; talk of a priesthood of the faithful is metaphorical since only clerics are priests "properly so called". The criticism of the reformers was unrelenting. Karl Rahner and Edward Schillebeeckx wrote detailed criticisms that were circulated among the Council Fathers. Given the renewal tendency manifested in the votes on earlier schemas, the schema on the Church was quite possibly headed for defeat. The day before the scheduled vote on acceptance in principle, Pope John intervened to say there were 2 problems with the schemas so far: too much material and not enough aggiornamento. So he was appointing a special commission to supervise the rewriting of all the schemas in order to reduce the amount of material and to better reflect the vision he had outlined in his opening address.

=== End of the first period ===
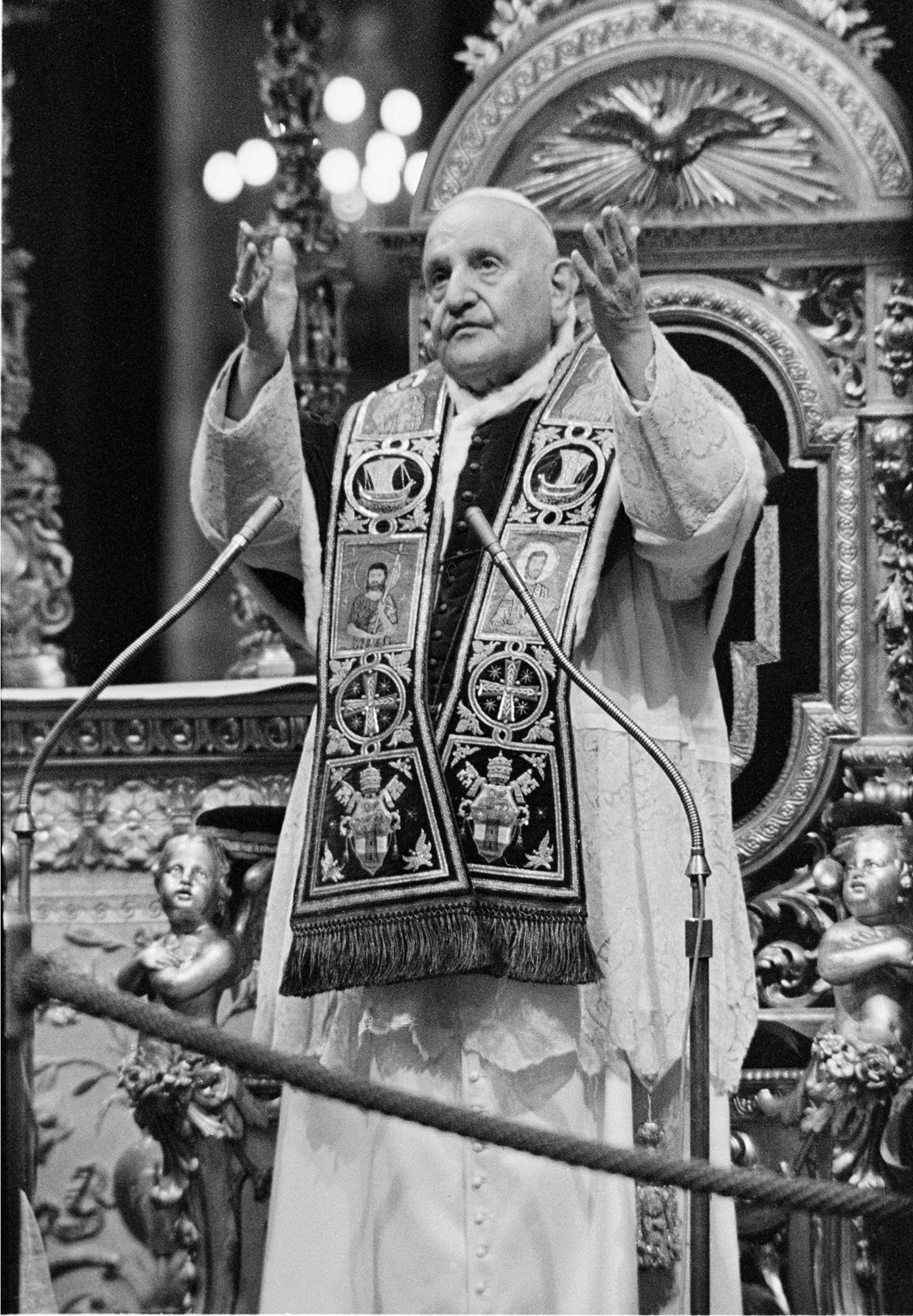
John XXIII closes the Council's first phase

Thus the first period ended on 8 December, having made little progress with the schemas: only 5 of the 22 had been examined and none had received final approval. Although the Council's "procedural slowness" was recognised, it also became clear, to most people's surprise, that a majority of participants were in favour of some degree of renewal. The prediction of curialists that the bishops would readily approve all of the schemas and that the council would be over in a matter of weeks was quite mistaken. And as a result, the work of the preparatory commissions would have to be redone in order to better reflect the spirit of renewal the pope had been expecting.

== Interval between first and second periods ==
=== Coordinating Commission and revision of the schemas ===
At the end of the first session, Pope John created a Coordinating Commission to supervise the conciliar commissions in the task of revising all the schemas in order to make them more open to aggiornamento and to reduce the amount of material. The commission's 7 members included 2 curial cardinals (Cicognani, the secretary of state, and Confalonieri of the Consistorial congregation) and 5 diocesan bishops (cardinals Suenens of Mechelen-Brussels, Döpfner of Munich, Liénart of Lille, Spellman of New York and Urbani of Venice). In the course of the next few months, all of the schemas would be rewritten under the Coordinating Commission's supervision. As a result, the number of schemas was reduced from 22 to 15, and they became more renewal-friendly.

=== Death of John XXIII and election of Paul VI ===
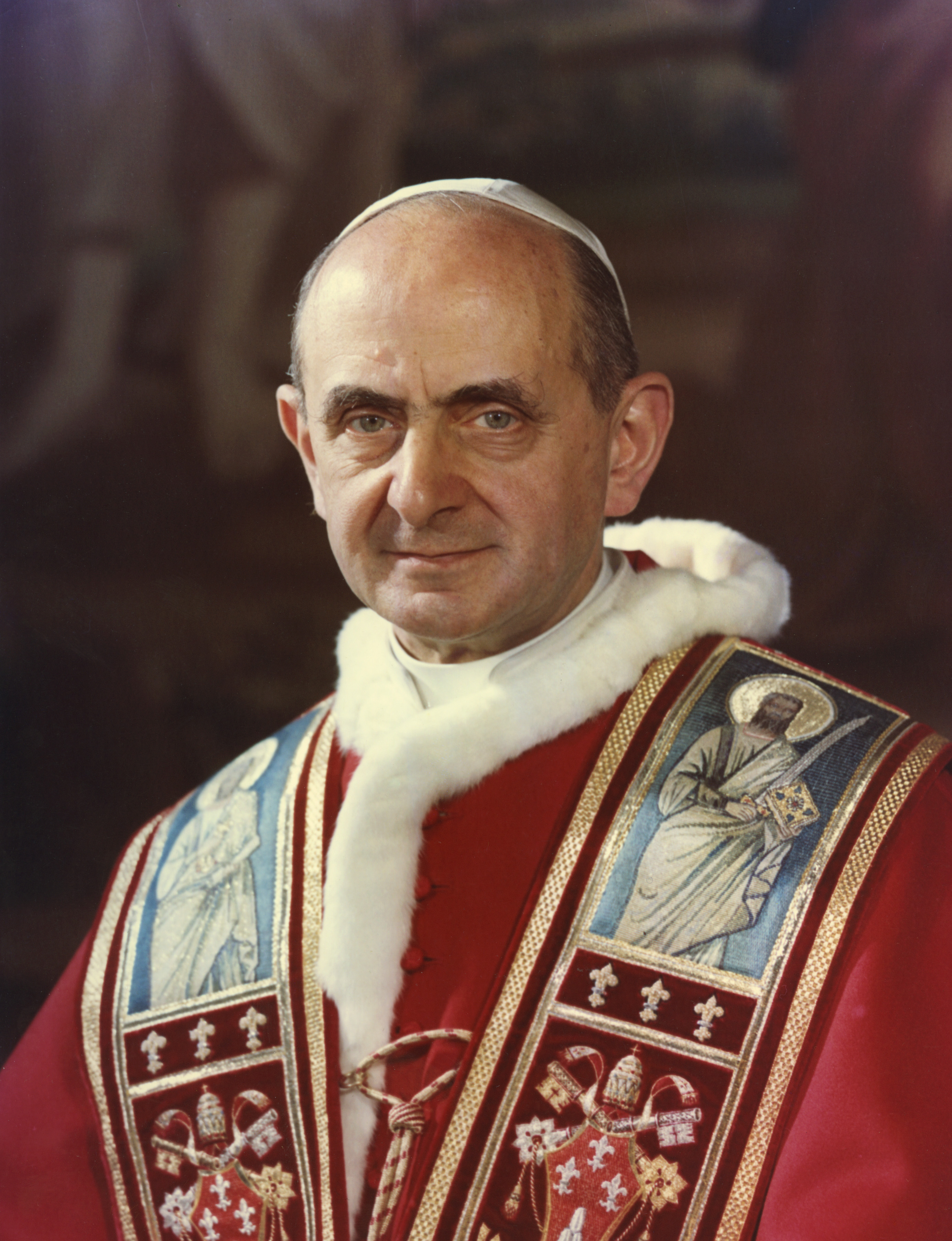
Pope Paul VI

Pope John XXIII died of stomach cancer on 3 June 1963, and the council was suspended in accordance with Canon Law until the next pope decided whether or not it would continue. Two weeks later, 82 cardinals met in Rome for the conclave, and elected Cardinal Giovanni Montini of Milan, a moderate reformer, as pope on 21 June, taking the name Paul VI. The day after his election, Paul VI announced that the council would continue and that it would be his "chief work".

=== Reorganization ===
Before the end of the summer, Paul VI decided to reorganize some of the structures of the council. The Coordinating Commission, originally intended to be temporary, was enlarged and made a permanent feature with oversight over the conciliar commissions. Four of its members – renewal-minded Cardinals Suenens, Döpfner and Lercaro (of Bologna), and moderate curialist Cardinal Agagianian – were given the additional task of chairing the daily General Congregations (instead of the 10-member Council of Presidents) with the title of "Moderators". Because they were members of the Coordinating Commission that supervised the other commissions and they also chaired the daily General Congregations, these four cardinals, three of whom were enthusiastic reformers, became the organizational linchpins of the council.

Before the beginning of the Second Period of the council, Pope Paul created a new category of Council participants: lay auditors, who sat in on General Congregations, though without the right to speak or vote. He also allowed more information about daily General Congregations to be provided to the press.

== Second period: 29 September – 4 December 1963 ==
=== Opening ===
In his hour-long Opening Address, Pope Paul reiterated the importance of the council, of Pope John's vision, of aggiornamento, and outlined what he considered to be the council's four tasks:

- The Church must present the world with a statement of its self-understanding.
- Aggiornamento must continue, not by breaking with tradition, but by removing what is defective.
- The Church must work towards unity among all Christians. Saying this, he turned to the non-Catholic observers and apologized for any injury the Catholic Church might have caused other Christians.
- The Church must engage in dialogue with the world: "not to conquer but to serve, not to despise but to appreciate, not to condemn but to comfort and save".

Five schemas were on the agenda for the Second Period, as well as the two accepted in principle during the first period: liturgy and means of social communication.

=== Schema on the Church ===
It was practically a new schema compared to the one discussed in the first period. It now contained much more Biblical imagery than legal language (believers were now called the "People of God" rather than the "subjects of the Church"), and there were 4 chapters instead of 11:

1. The Mystery of the Church
2. The Hierarchical Structure of the Church
3. The People of God
4. The Universal Call to Holiness (an expansion of the former "The States of Perfection")

After 2 days of debate, it was accepted in principle by a vote of 2,231 to 43.

==== The Mystery of the Church ====
The most important issue in this chapter concerned the relation of the Mystical body of Christ to the Catholic Church and to other Christian denominations. Instead of speaking of membership in the Church, the schema spoke of being "in communion with" the Church: this allowed it to say that non-Catholic Christians were in "imperfect communion" with the Church of Christ. Many elements of sanctification are available outside the Church, and the Holy Spirit works for the sanctification of all the baptized.

==== The Hierarchical Structure of the Church ====
The question of the relation of bishops to the Pope would be the great bone of contention of the Second Session. The traditional view was that bishops derived their authority to govern from the Pope and their authority was limited to their diocese except during an ecumenical Council. The schema proposed that bishops' authority derived from their ordination, and that all the bishops formed a "College" that, together with the Pope, had authority over the whole Church at all times, but especially during a General Council.

Conservatives argued that this diminished the Pope's authority, and therefore went against Vatican I's definition of the Pope's primacy. The schema said the Church was founded on Peter and the apostles, but the conservatives responded that it was founded on Peter alone, and therefore collegiality – the collegial nature of Church authority – had no basis in Scripture.

Another topic of controversy in the chapter was the proposal that the diaconate be restored as a permanent ordained ministry, and especially the suggestion that it might be open to married men. The prospect of ordained ministers who were married shocked some conservatives.

The debate on Chapter 2 lasted from 4 to 15 October, as the same arguments were stated over and over again. Seeing that the debate was getting bogged down, the moderators met with the Pope to discuss the way forward. It was suggested to extract from the text a series of propositions and to have the Council Fathers vote on them so as to ascertain the "mind of the Council". The Pope first accepted, then backed down when lobbied by conservatives, then agreed once again. The vote on 5 propositions took place on 30 October:

1. Episcopal consecration is the highest degree of the sacrament of orders. Yes: 2,123. No: 34
2. All legitimately consecrated bishops who are in communion with one another and with the Pope form a College of Bishops. Yes: 2,154. No: 104.
3. This College of Bishops is the successor of the College of the Apostles and, in communion with the Pope, enjoys full and supreme power over the universal Church. Yes: 2,148. No: 336.
4. The authority of the College of Bishops (united with the Pope) is of divine origin [and not by delegation from the Pope]. Yes: 2,138. No: 408.
5. It is opportune to consider the restoration of the diaconate as a permanent degree of ordained ministry. Yes: 2,120. No: 525.

Again, lop-sided majorities in favour of renewal, though almost 20% of the Council Fathers voted against proposition 4, and almost 25% against proposition 5. Though collegiality was an idea most of the bishops had never heard of before, they had experienced collegiality at the council itself, and this experience had convinced them of the validity of the idea.

==== The People of God ====
Some of the ideas developed in the chapter were:

- baptism as the basis for the participation of Christians in Christ's mission as priest, prophet and king;
- the sensus fidelium (the "sense of the faithful")
- the sanctification of Christians can occur even through their secular pursuits;
- infallibility as a charism of the whole People of God, and not just of the bishops and Pope.

The conservatives said the chapter minimized the difference between laity and clergy, and embraced the Protestant idea of the priesthood of all baptized, when in fact it was only a metaphor.

==== The Universal Call to Holiness ====
Unlike the previous version that focused on the call to holiness of members of religious orders, this new version began with the idea that all Christians were called to holiness and it is only after this that the religious life was described as one way of achieving holiness.

=== Schema on the Virgin Mary ===
This schema produced by the preparatory theological commission was in line with traditional Catholic doctrine: it reasserted the importance of Marian devotion (against those who thought Marian piety was excessive), her perpetual virginity (against those who questioned this), her universal mediation and her central role in redemption (though not the claim that she was co-redeemer). The reformers thought the schema on Mary should be a chapter of the schema on the Church. The conservatives wanted it to remain separate in order to stress her importance. The vote on 29 October was surprisingly close: the proposal to move the schema on Mary into the schema on the Church won by only 40 votes.

=== Schema on Bishops and the Governance of Dioceses ===
This was a relatively short document that dealt with practical matters: the relationship of diocesan bishops to the Curia, to their priests and to religious orders; the role of auxiliary bishops; the division or amalgamation of dioceses; national bishops' conferences. The theology underpinning the schema was traditional: stress on the primacy of the pope; episcopal authority as a concession by the pope; and of course, nothing about collegiality. This became the main argument of the reformers in favour of having the schema rewritten. Some of them were arguing for the creation of a council of bishops with a rotating membership that would always be in session in Rome to assist the pope in the governance of the Church.

Most of the discussion was about the relation between bishops and the central government of the Church. In the course of this discussion, Cardinal Frings of Cologne delivered a biting criticism of the Curia, arguing that the central administration of the Church had to be thoroughly reformed, especially the Holy Office. Cardinal Ottaviani angrily responded, defending the Curia and the department he headed. This passionate exchange was the most dramatic moment of the Second Session. Cardinal Frings' speech had been written in part by his personal theologian, Joseph Ratzinger, who would one day become the head of the same Holy Office, renamed in 1967 the Congregation for the Doctrine of the Faith.

Other topics that were touched on during the discussion were the status of national episcopal conferences, and the need for bishops to retire at a certain age. No one raised the question of how bishops were appointed.

=== Schemas on Liturgy and Modern Means of Communication ===
The council then brought to a close the discussion of the two schemas approved in principle during the First Period. For the schema on liturgy, matters proceeded quickly and on 22 November, the document that would set in motion the most important liturgical reform in the history of the Church received final approval by a vote of 2,159 to 19.

Many Fathers found the schema on the modern means of communication lackluster and innocuous. Some decided to vote against it for that reason, but many others just wanted to get it out of the way in order to focus on more important matters. So, it received final approval on 25 November by a vote of 1,598 to 503. A quarter of the Fathers voted against it to show their displeasure.

=== Schema on Ecumenism ===
The revised schema on ecumenism from the Secretariat for Christian Unity came before the council on 18 November. It was a hybrid document of 5 chapters, 3 of them on ecumenism, one on non-Christian religions ("especially the Jews") and one on religious liberty. All 3 topics were controversial.

The 3 chapters on ecumenism (a merger of 3 previous documents) took a very positive view of ecumenism, and said things some bishops had never heard before:

- Catholics must be involved in ecumenical endeavours (a reversal of the pre-conciliar ban on involvement)
- Catholics should acknowledge that faults by Catholics in the past often contributed to separation
- The document contained no call for non-Catholics to "return" to the Catholic Church
- Chapter 3 listed many admirable features of non-Catholic Christians.

Some conservatives spoke out against the text, repeating the Church's traditional stand that non-Catholics were in error and should simply return to the true Church. Nevertheless, the chapters on ecumenism were surprisingly well received, and were accepted in principle by a wide margin, with only 86 dissenting voices. Discussion of the 3 chapters on ecumenism took up all the time remaining before the end of the second session, and there was no time left to discuss non-Christian religions or religious freedom.

=== End of the second period ===
At a public session on 4 December, Pope Paul solemnly promulgated the first two documents of the council: the Constitution on Sacred Liturgy (Sacrosanctum Concilium) and the Decree on the Modern Means of Social Communication (Inter mirifica). At the end of his closing speech, he stunned the Council Fathers by announcing that he would undertake a pilgrimage to the Holy Land, the first time in five centuries a Pope had left Italy (except for the time when Napoleon carried off the pope to France as his prisoner).

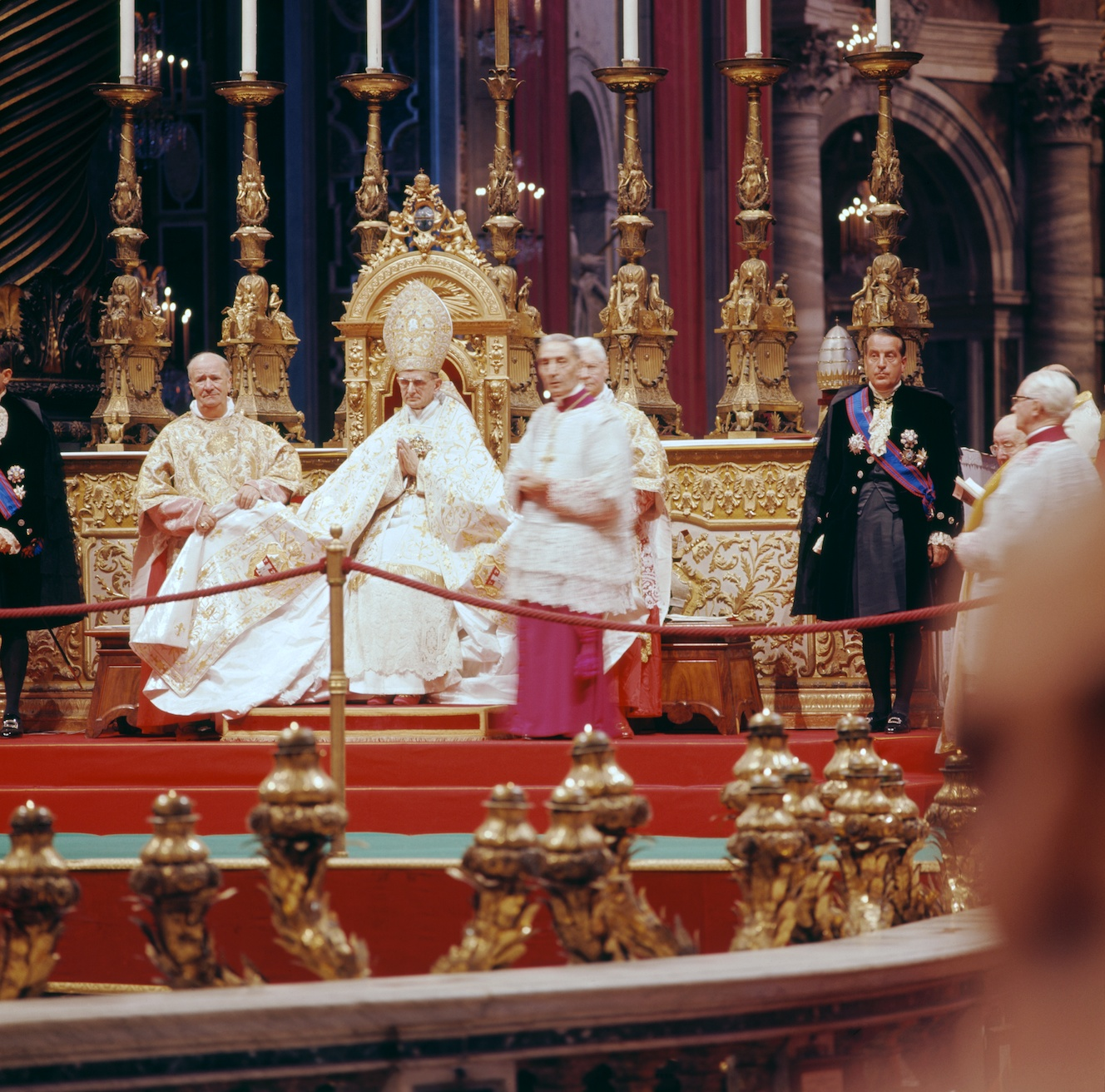
Paul VI presiding over the introductory ingress of the council, flanked by Cardinal Alfredo Ottaviani (left), Cardinal Camerlengo Benedetto Aloisi Masella and Monsignor Enrico Dante (future Cardinal), Papal Master of Ceremonies (right), and two Papal gentlemen.

== Interval between second and third periods ==
=== Pilgrimage to the Holy Land ===
In early January (4–6 January 1964), Pope Paul went on a three-day pilgrimage to the Holy Land, where he met Athenagoras, patriarch of Constantinople and spiritual head of the Eastern Orthodox churches. It was the first meeting between a pope and a patriarch of Constantinople in 600 years. It broke down centuries of suspicion and estrangement, and gave great hope to the ecumenical movement.

=== Revision of the schemas ===
The revision of the schemas continued. By mid-summer, all of the remaining schemas were sent to the Council Fathers in the expectation that the next session would be the last. The revision of the schema on the Church had been particularly difficult. In mid-summer, Pope Paul surprised everyone by letting the doctrinal commission know that he would like some changes to the schema. The Commission accepted some changes he wanted but not others, and the pope seemed satisfied. The day before the beginning of the third session, the pope received a confidential memorandum from 25 cardinals and 13 superiors-general of religious orders of men, asking him to intervene and prevent the doctrine of collegiality from being accepted at the council.

=== Encyclical on the Church ===
Five weeks before the opening of the Third Session, pope Paul published his first encyclical, Ecclesiam suam, on the Church. Some were annoyed that the pope would issue an encyclical on the very subject that was being discussed at the council.

=== Women lay auditors ===
Following a remark by Cardinal Suenens at the end of the second session that women were absent from the council, Pope Paul appointed 15 women to be lay auditors during the third session. Eventually 23 women, including 10 religious, would sit in on debates as official auditors. While 3 of the male auditors would eventually be asked to address the Council Fathers about their concerns as laypeople, none of the women would be asked to speak.

== Third period: 14 September – 21 November 1964 ==
=== Opening ===
The third session opened with a ceremony that most people in the Latin Church had never experienced before: a concelebrated mass. The Pope celebrated mass along with 24 bishops representing 19 different countries. The mass was followed by a long address by the Pope, in which the relationship between the papacy and the episcopal office figured prominently. While granting the importance of strengthening the episcopal function, he defended the authority and prerogatives of the papacy.

Most Council Fathers hoped this would be the final Session of the council. The hope was optimistic since 6 schemas had not finished their course through the conciliar process, and 8 others had not even been examined yet. Seven of these were "practical" schemas whose goal was to update various aspects of the life and practice of the Church. The eighth was the important schema about the Church in the Modern World. It would eventually become clear that a fourth session was necessary.

=== Schema on the Church ===
After being revised during the interval, the schema now had 8 chapters instead of 4.

1. The Mystery of the Church
2. The People of God
3. The Hierarchical Structure; in particular the Episcopate
4. The Laity
5. The Universal Call to Holiness
6. The Religious Life
7. The Pilgrim Church and its Union with the Church in Heaven
8. The Virgin Mary

The chapter on the People of God had been moved from third to second place, so that the unifying factor (of being the People of God) came before the distinction between clergy (chapter 3) and laity (chapter 4). From the previous chapter on the universal call to holiness, 2 new chapters had been extracted: one on the laity with its own theology (chapter 4) and one on the religious life as one way of responding to the call to holiness (chapter 6). A chapter on the Church in heaven had been added, and the former schema on the Virgin Mary had been adapted to become chapter 8.

In order to make sure chapter 3 reflected as closely as possible the wishes of the Fathers, there would be 39 separate votes on various parts of the chapter and various formulations of its provisions. The voting took place over the course of 8 sittings, from 21 to 30 September. Every formulation but one was accepted with large majorities, including those on collegiality, on the restoration of the diaconate and on admitting married men to the diaconate. The only one voted down was to allow unmarried permanent deacons to marry after ordination.

=== Schema on Bishops ===
The revised schema on bishops was very different from the conservative text discussed at the previous Session. It now began with an affirmation of collegiality, and it proposed, in very general terms, that collegiality be implemented by creating a body of bishops that would meet regularly with the Pope. It also proposed in equally general terms a reform of the Curia.

=== Schemas on religious freedom and non-Christian religions ===
On 23 September, the Council Fathers finally got the opportunity to discuss the two texts that had originally been appended to the schema on ecumenism and were now separate schemas.

==== Religious Freedom ====
The text on religious freedom proclaimed the right of everyone to freedom of religion. That is, freedom from coercion by the state in matters of religious belief and practice. It was well known that there was strong opposition to this declaration, perhaps even greater than to collegiality. Quite simply, it ran counter to the position the Catholic Church had defended for centuries.

The Church's traditional position was that Catholics were entitled to freedom everywhere, but non-Catholics were not entitled to freedom in countries with a Catholic majority. In the mid-20th century, there were still discriminatory laws against Protestants in Spain and some Latin American countries. Protestants claimed the Catholic Church's stance on ecumenism could not be taken seriously as long as it supported such restrictions on religious freedom.

The Church's basic premise before Vatican II was that Catholicism was the only true religion and, since "error has no rights", no other religion was entitled to religious freedom. If all religions were treated equally, that would imply they were all of equal value, a position labelled "indifferentism". If the council was to defend religious freedom, it had to do so in a way that did not imply that all religions were of equal value. The text presented to the Council did this by basing religious freedom on the person's duty to obey his/her conscience. From this, it followed that the law must not coerce a person to act against his/her conscience.

The criticism from the conservatives about a declaration of religious freedom was unrelenting: "this represented a reversal of the Church's previous teaching... it fostered indifferentism... it was Modernism... it would cause the ruin of the Catholic Church," said Archbishop Lefebvre.

Support for religious freedom was strongest among the bishops from countries where it was the normal state of affairs, such as the English-speaking world and most Western European countries. The American bishops, who had not played a particularly important role at the council up to this point, made religious freedom "their" cause. Religious freedom was also defended by bishops who lived under communist regimes where the Church suffered persecution. In the mind of supporters, the Church's double standard was simply untenable: Catholics could no longer demand freedom for themselves while denying it to others.

Given the ferocity of the opposition, many wondered whether the chapter would ever manage to receive the requisite two-thirds majority.

==== "On the Jews and non-Christians" ====
Pope John had wanted the Church to take a stand against all forms of antisemitism. A first statement "On the Jews" had been prepared for the first session, then dropped for political reasons: Arab Christians claimed that their governments would interpret it as tilting toward Israel in the Arab-Jewish Middle East conflict, and Christians would suffer for this. A statement on the Jews now returned as part of a broader schema "On the Jews and non-Christians".

The objective was to reject any theological basis for antisemitism, in particular the centuries-old claim that the Jews were cursed by God because they had refused to accept the Gospel and had killed Jesus Christ. Many bishops supported the declaration. As with religious freedom, the Americans were strongly in favour. But some conservatives were unwilling to deviate from the traditional line of thinking. The discussion lasted two days, and on 30 September, the chapter was returned to the Secretariat for Christian Unity for further revision.

==== Papal Intervention ====
The normal course of events was suddenly interrupted a week and a half later (19 October). Pope Paul, obviously under pressure from conservatives, let it be known that he wanted the texts on Religious Freedom and on Non-Christian Religions rewritten by a joint commission that would include conservative members of the Doctrinal Commission. The outcry was considerable and eventually the Pope backed down.

=== Schema on Revelation ===
After being rejected in the First Session, the schema on Revelation had not made a return appearance since that remarkable day almost 2 years earlier. A second version had been produced in 1963 but it was considered too bland, and a third version was not ready in time to be introduced during the Second Session. And so on 30 September this third version was presented to the Council Fathers.

Where the original version said there were two separate sources of Revelation – Scripture and Tradition – and that some revealed truths were contained in Tradition alone, the current version took a more nuanced position. It rejected the idea that there were two separate "sources" of Revelation or that Revelation consisted in propositions handed down by God, some in the Bible and others in Tradition. There is only one source, which is God revealing himself. Instead of insisting on the "separateness" of Scripture and Tradition, it insisted on their close connection, without indicating exactly how they were connected. But most importantly, it said nothing about whether Tradition contained revealed truths that were not in the Bible. The conservatives strongly insisted on such a statement. The reformers, on the other hand, thought the issue was not ready to be settled: they wanted to leave it open to further discussion by theologians.

The new text said that Tradition was found not only in the Church's teaching, but in its liturgy and in people's spiritual experiences. The conservatives thought this too subjective. The schema said that Tradition "progresses". The conservatives would have none of this. The schema did not state clearly whether the Bible was completely free from error. The conservatives insisted the text should clearly state that it was.

In spite of these objections, it was clear the schema had considerable support. Discussion ended on 6 October, and the text was sent to the doctrinal commission for further revision.

=== Seven New Schemas ===
After 3 weeks of dealing with the schemas already moving through the conciliar process, the Council Fathers then turned to examining the schemas they had not yet seen. They were introduced in rapid succession at a rate of about one a week.

==== Schema on the Apostolate of the Laity ====
The theology of the laity had been set out in chapter 4 of the document on the Church. Now, this 5-chapter schema on the Lay Apostolate was meant as the practical application of this theology. Introduced on 6 October, it stated that lay people had their own task of changing the world in accordance with the Gospel, and that this mission was based on their baptism and their participation in the royal priesthood of Christ. They carried out this mission either individually – by bearing witness to the Gospel in their personal lives – or by taking part in Church organizations and movements.

All of this was relatively uncontroversial. There was one divisive issue. The traditional view was that, in performing their mission in the world, the laity always had to be under the direction of the clergy. The "modern" view was that this should not always be the case. Some speakers thought the schema did not insist enough on the laity's role as subordinate to the clergy; others claimed it insisted too much on this subordinate role and was "too clerical".

Debate ended on 13 October. Before the schema was sent off to be revised according to the bishops' comments, a layman spoke to the bishops about the schema: he was Patrick Keegan, president of the World Federation of Christian Workers. This was the first time a layperson had been asked to express his views on a schema being discussed by the Council Fathers.

==== Schema on the Ministry and Life of Priests ====
Introduced on 13 October, the schema sought to give a renewed vision of the task of priests, for example, by insisting that priests should act towards laypeople "not only as pastors and teachers but also as brothers dealing with brothers". The schema also insisted on the importance of clerical celibacy. While most of the speakers at the council tip-toed around the issue, there was much talk outside the council hall about the future of clerical celibacy. Some speakers mentioned the lack of priests in Latin America and the decline in vocations that was already taking place in Italy and France, and wondered what measures could be taken to reverse the trend.

==== Schema on the Eastern Churches ====
The Eastern Catholic Churches were those branches of Catholicism in Eastern Europe and the Middle East – the Maronites, the Melkites, the Copts, the Ukrainians – whose theological, canonical and liturgical traditions were rooted in ancient Greek Christianity. They represented a very small fraction of the total population of the Catholic Church and in the past often had Latin traditions imposed on them. In these Churches decision-making was usually collegial, and the most important of these Churches were headed by a Patriarch.

The schema that was presented to the council on 15 October sought to defend their particular traditions against the inevitable tendency to "Latinize" them. Some thought the schema was still "too Western" but on the whole it was well received by the Council Fathers, and only a few revisions were necessary before it was ready for final approval a few weeks later.

==== Schema on the Church's Missionary Activity ====
Presented on 6 November, the schema sought to give a renewed vision of the Church's missionary activity, by arguing for less control by Rome and greater adaptation to local cultures. It was judged to be too cursory and was sent back to its commission to be expanded.

==== Schema on the Renewal of Religious Life ====
The schema called for religious orders to adapt to modern conditions while remaining faithful to their original purpose and spirit. After 2 days of discussion (10–12 November) it too was judged to be too brief and was sent back to be expanded.

==== Schema on Priestly Formation ====
This schema, introduced on 12 November, presented a renewed vision of the training of priests. It put forward a few innovative proposals: the program of priestly training should be determined by the bishops of each country rather than by Rome (though Rome's approval would be required), and the study of Scripture should be the basis for seminary studies. Some conservatives complained that the schema did not insist on the centrality of the theology of Thomas Aquinas in the curriculum. But the bishops' reception of the document was overwhelmingly positive.

==== Schema on Christian Education ====
Introduced on 17 November, four days before the end of the Session, this schema mainly reiterated what the Church had been saying about Catholic education. Coming as it did during the last week of the Third Session, it found itself embroiled in the turbulent events of that week (see below). So the bishops gave it a hasty preliminary approval, to get it out of the way.

=== Schema on the Church in the Modern World ===
On 20 October, the last of the great doctrinal schemas was presented to the Council Fathers. It had had a lengthy genesis and had not been ready before this late date. The idea for a "social" schema, one that discussed the problems of the modern world and the Church's willingness to take part in solving them, was born during the interval between the First and Second Periods, and the project had gone through many drafts before it was ready for the Council Fathers. No previous Council had ever attempted such a project: instead of being concerned with internal Church matters, the schema addressed contemporary social problems, such as economic and social justice, and problems of war and peace.

The schema included 4 short chapters of a more theoretical nature giving the theological basis for the Church's – and the individual Christian's – involvement in social matters, and 5 appendices addressing practical issues:

Introduction
Chapter 1: On the human vocation
Chapter 2: On the Church in service to God and mankind
Chapter 3: On how Christians should conduct themselves in the world in which they lived
Chapter 4: On some special responsibilities of Christians in today's world
Conclusion

Appendix 1: On the human person in society
Appendix 2: On marriage and the family
Appendix 3: On the promotion of culture
Appendix 4: On economic and social issues
Appendix 5: On human solidarity and peace

Certain themes could be found throughout the document, such as the dignity of the human person, the need for solidarity among people of all racial, ethnic, religious or socioeconomic groups and the obligation of all people to work for a world of greater justice. The schema presented the Church as a beacon of hope in a troubled world and a helpmate for all persons of good will. While the Church had a specific message to present to the world – that of the Gospel – she wanted to play a "servant" role, and was ready to "dialogue" with the modern world in a search for solutions. And she even acknowledged that the world could help the Church be true to herself.

Most speakers welcomed the schema. Few thought it was a bad idea in principle, but there were many suggestions to improve it. From the conservatives: the Church should be talking more about its supernatural mission than about human endeavours, and the schema should contain a condemnation of Marxism. From the reformers: the schema should promote the position of women in society; there should be a strong condemnation of racism; the schema should condemn nuclear war.

The most interesting result of the discussion was the division it created among the reform-minded bishops and theologians. The French loved the document, which reflected typical concerns of recent French theology, while the Germans thought it was too optimistic and discounted the sinfulness of the world. Congar and Daniélou represented the first view, Rahner and Ratzinger the second.

The appendix on marriage and the family caused fireworks. The conservatives were indignant that:

– the text treated the two traditional ends of marriage (procreation of children and mutual love of the spouses) as if they were of equal importance, while the long-standing position had been that procreation was the "primary" end;
– the text said the spouses were entitled to decide the number of children they would have;
– the text did not explicitly reaffirm the recent popes' condemnation of birth control.

Birth control was the burning issue of the day. In 1963 Pope John had set up a papal commission to study the issue. There was a general understanding that the council should avoid discussing the issue and wait until the papal commission had reported. But that was easier said than done. Various Council Fathers began suggesting that perhaps the time had come to revisit the Church's ban on contraception.

After two and a half weeks of debate, the schema was returned for revision by the joint Commission that had produced it.

=== "Black Week" ===
At the beginning of the last week of the third session (Monday, 16 November), the schemas on the Church and on Ecumenism were ready for final approval that week, and that on Religious Freedom was almost there. But the Council Fathers were about to experience the most dramatic and disturbing week of the whole Council. The reformers nicknamed it "Black Week".

These three schemas were still being opposed by a dogged group of conservatives. Because they did not have the votes to prevent final approval, their only recourse was to lobby Pope Paul to prevent their adoption in their present form. The pressure on the Pope was unrelenting, and eventually he gave in.

==== Religious Freedom ====
The schema on Religious Freedom that the bishops were to vote on had been considerably amended since the earlier debate at the beginning of the current session. The opponents now raised a procedural point: the text was substantially different from the one discussed earlier, and Council Regulations required that there be a new debate on this amended text rather than simply proceed to a vote. The Pope was lobbied by both groups, the reformers insisting the vote should go ahead, the conservatives that it should not. He finally sided with the conservatives, and the Council Fathers were told the schema on Religious Freedom would be postponed until the Fourth Session. While many Council Fathers were furious at the time, in retrospect his decision now seems reasonable.

==== Ecumenism ====
As the earlier votes on each of its chapters had shown, the schema on Ecumenism had overwhelming support. But some conservatives had convinced the Pope that some of the wording was dangerous. On 19 November, two days before the end of the session, Pope Paul sent the Council Fathers 19 changes he insisted be made to the schema before he would agree to promulgate it. The changes had little effect on the substance of the schema, but seemed to many people to be petty. Some of them offended the Protestant observers: for instance, in the section listing the positive features of Protestantism, the passage that said Protestants "found" Christ in the Scriptures had to be changed to say they "sought" Christ in the Scriptures. Faced with this ultimatum, the Council Fathers agreed to the changes and the final vote on the schema was again a landslide: 2,054 to 64.

==== The Church ====
The most important intervention by Pope Paul concerned chapter 3 of the schema on the Church, the chapter dealing with collegiality. Opponents of the schema argued that it diminished the Pope's powers, and Pope Paul came to be convinced of this. So he insisted that a Nota explicativa praevia ("Preliminary Explanatory Note") be added to the schema, saying collegiality did not diminish the Church's traditional teaching about the primacy of the Pope. The conservatives were satisfied this note robbed collegiality of all its force, while reformers thought it would have no effect on the way collegiality would be understood after the council. But the note did have two immediate consequences: this last-minute unilateral intervention created great resentment among the reformers and damaged relations between them and the Pope, but it also convinced most of the holdouts to accept the schema. The final vote on the schema on 19 November was almost unanimous: 2,134 to 10.

On the Vatican website, the explanatory note can be found between the main text and the endnotes.

=== End of the third session ===
Saturday, 21 November was the closing day of the third session. Three schemas now became official Council documents when they were promulgated by the Pope: the very important Constitution on the Church, the Decree on Ecumenism and the Decree on the Eastern Churches.

During the closing ceremony, Pope Paul delivered a long address in which he expressed satisfaction with the work of the third session. Halfway through the address, he began speaking of the Virgin Mary, and then spent the last half of the address on this subject. He announced he was conferring on Mary a new title, that of "Mother of the Church". This displeased many people: the title was not traditional, it was an obstacle to ecumenism, and it placed Mary above the Church rather than within it. This move capped a week of initiatives by the Pope that frayed relations between him and the Council Fathers. After a very stressful week, everyone was happy to go home.

== Interval between third and fourth periods ==
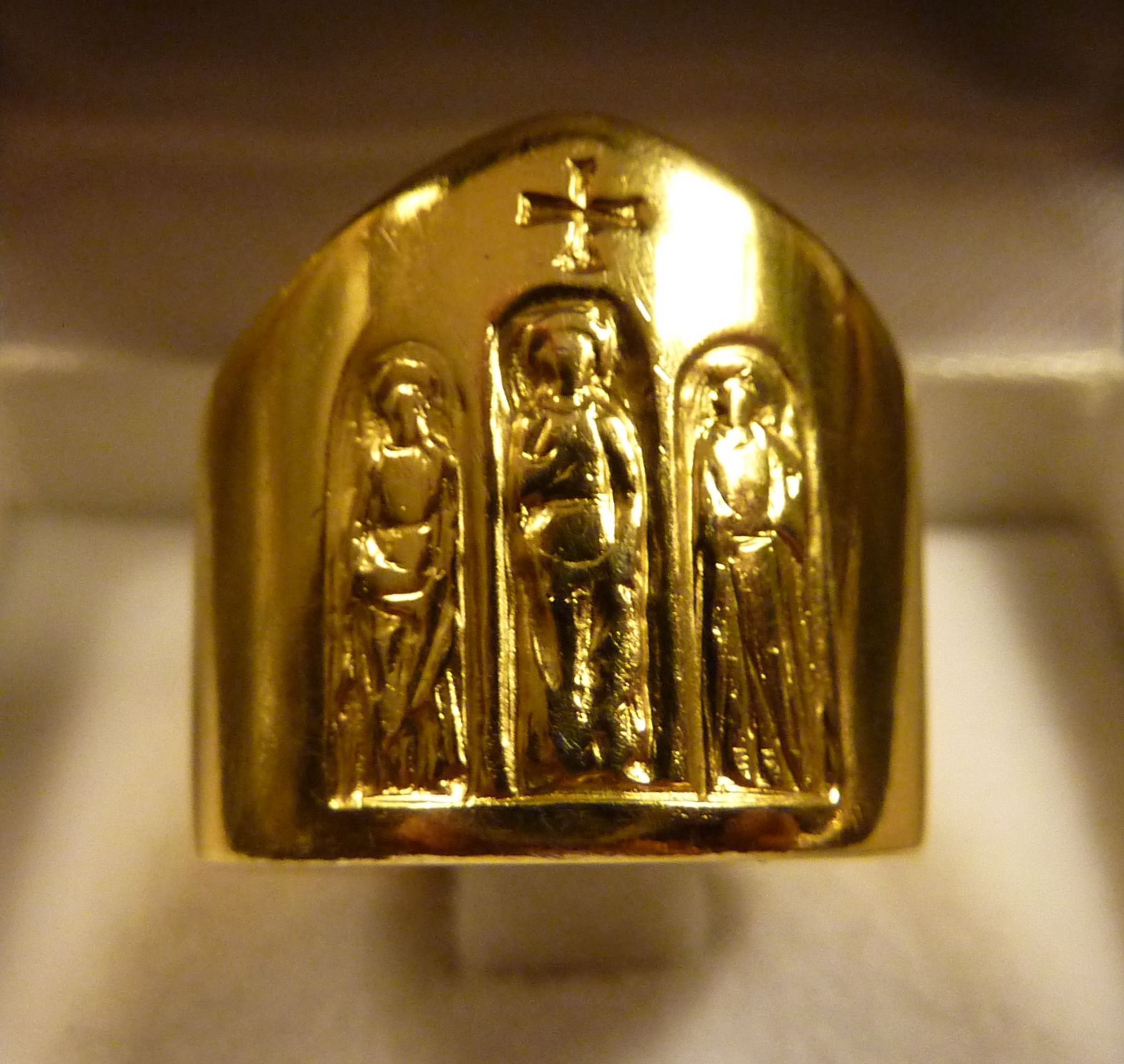
"Council ring" given to participating Cardinals

=== Trip to India ===
In early December 1964, Pope Paul travelled to India to take part in the International Eucharistic Congress held in Bombay (now Mumbai). By visiting a non-Christian third-world country, he wanted to show the Church's openness to non-Christian religions and to the problems of the modern world, two topics being discussed at the council.

=== First liturgical changes ===
The previous September, the Consilium for the Implementation of the Constitution on the Liturgy had published the first changes to the celebration of mass, changes to come into effect on 7 March 1965. On that day, Catholics around the world experienced for the first time mass celebrated partly in their own language and "facing the people". To show his support for these changes, Pope Paul began celebrating mass according to the new rules each Sunday in a different Rome parish.

=== Ongoing revision of the schemas ===
At the end of the third session, 11 schemas remained unfinished and during the interval between the sessions the commissions worked to give them their final form. The schemas that were having the bumpiest ride were those on Revelation, Religious freedom, Non-Christian Religions, and The Church in the Modern World. Cardinal Ritter observed that, "We were stalled by the delaying tactics of a very small minority" in the Curia who were more industrious in communicating with the pope than was the more progressive majority.

== Fourth period: 14 September – 8 December 1965 ==
The last period of the council opened on 14 September 1965. There were still 11 schemas making their way through the conciliar process. Given the number of schemas, the session was planned to be 12 weeks long, 2 weeks longer than the others.

=== Opening ===
Pope Paul gave a long opening address, extolling the council as a great event in the life of the Church and expressing great support for the Church's concern for the fate of the world (echoes of the schema on the Church in the Modern World).

He then made 2 surprising announcements. He planned on creating a body of bishops that would meet occasionally with him in an exercise of collegial responsibility for the whole Church, which was met with great applause. Secondly, he would go to New York to speak at the United Nations about the Church's interest in fostering "concord, justice, fraternal love, and peace among all human beings". More applause. The two announcements buoyed the spirits of the Council Fathers at the beginning of what promised to be a long and possibly difficult fourth session.

The very next day, the Pope issued Apostolica sollicitudo, the motu proprio creating the Synod of Bishops. Enthusiasm waned when it became clear that the Synod would be a purely advisory body completely under the authority of the Pope. Those who thought the Synod of Bishops might one day exercise power over the Curia were disappointed. Some believed the sudden announcement was a preemptive move to forestall any vote by the council in favour of a more powerful episcopal body.

=== Schemas: Religious Freedom, Revelation ===
Religious Freedom

Though a procedural maneuver at the end of the last session had succeeded in prolonging debate on the schema, nothing new was being said. The same arguments were being advanced for and against by the same people as before. After three days of repetitive debate, the vote on whether the schema was acceptable in principle took place 21 September: 1,997 in favour, 224 opposed. Some 10% of the Council Fathers were opposed, but this was far less than was feared.

==== Revelation ====
The schema on Revelation returned to the council hall, changed slightly from the previous Session, when it had been approved in principle. It still did not say what the conservatives wanted: a clear statement that Tradition contained revealed truths not found in Scripture. Instead, the schema had adopted a compromise position: "The whole of Catholic doctrine cannot be proved from Scripture alone." That was not enough for the conservatives. But the time for debating was over: the schema had returned to the council hall only to be voted on. There were multiple votes, ending on 22 September. The schema passed easily, but 1,498 amendments were proposed. And so the schema was returned to the Doctrinal Commission.

As the conservatives realized they could not win in the council hall, they went to the Pope. Two days later, Cardinal Ottaviani, head of the Doctrinal Commission, received a letter from Pope Paul indicating that he wanted the schema to be more specific about Tradition as a "source of revelation". This created division within the commission, as many were dead set against this, while others did not want to antagonize the Pope. After days of debate, the commission finally settled on the following: "The Church does not draw her certainty for all revealed truths from Scripture alone." This seemed to satisfy the Pope. After the Commission dealt with all the amendments submitted by the Council Fathers, the schema would return for a final vote later in the session.

=== Schema on the Church in the Modern World ===
On 21 September, the Council Fathers began discussing the schema on the Church in the Modern World. Many changes had been made to the text first seen during the previous session, but they were mainly matters of detail. The 5 appendices of the previous version had been converted to chapters, so it was now a schema of two parts, a more theoretical one of 4 chapters about the vocation of man and the Church's role of service for the well-being of mankind, and a more practical one of 5 chapters discussing topics such as marriage, culture, social justice, and war and peace.

The schema was different from previous documents in the history of councils. The Church, it said, sees itself as a partner in cooperation and dialogue with all humanity. All members of the human family must work together. For Christians, "nothing that is genuinely human fails to find an echo in their hearts." The text also said that the Church could learn from the secular world. It was contrasting with the condemnations of the errors of the world often found in previous Church pronouncements.

Among the problems facing the schema was that the Germans thought it was too optimistic. The French and German bishops met to try to come to an understanding. Eventually, many German bishops would accept the schema grudgingly as better than nothing.

The conservatives attacked the schema: the supernatural mission of the Church was being forgotten. Some Fathers wondered if it deserved to be a Constitution, or whether it shouldn't be a letter or message to the world. But, after 3 days of discussion the Fathers voted to accept it in principle, and then moved on to study each of its chapters.

The theoretical part of the schema was generally well received. Some bishops wanted an explicit condemnation of communism; as a compromise, the schema referred to previous papal condemnations but did not issue a condemnation of its own.

The chapter about marriage and the family still did not say that procreation was the primary end of marriage. Many bishops were shocked when a Melkite archbishop said the Church should find a way to allow an abandoned spouse to remarry.

Most bishops said nice things about the chapter on culture. A notable speech was given by archbishop Pellegrino of Turin: he called for greater freedom of research in the Church and a less punitive attitude by Church authorities – he was thinking here especially of the Holy Office, headed by Cardinal Ottaviani – towards thinkers who choose to pursue new issues in theology.

The next chapter, on social and economic matters, discussed issues that had been treated by the papal encyclicals that formed what is known as the Social Doctrine of the Church. Some Council Fathers questioned the need for such a chapter, since the papal encyclicals already said everything that needed to be said. But the chapter was well received by most Fathers.

The last chapter was about war and peace. The main issue was whether the availability of nuclear weapons made obsolete the traditional distinction between just and unjust wars. Many speakers thought so: no war that made use of nuclear weapons could be a just war. A related issue was whether it was legitimate to even have nuclear weapons. Many thought it was legitimate to have them (as a deterrent) but not to make use of them. A few American bishops, wanting to defend their country's possession of nuclear weapons, organized a campaign urging Council Fathers to vote against the schema's position on nuclear arms, but it fizzled out.

The debate on the schema ended on 8 October after 13 days of discussion. The schema now returned to its originating Committee for revision. There were 400 pages of proposed amendments to deal with, and the question was whether the commission could sift through them and return the schema to the full assembly in time for the schema to be accepted before the end of the session.

=== Pope Paul at the United Nations ===
Part way through the debate on the Church in the Modern World, the Council Fathers' attention turned towards North America, for on 4 October, Pope Paul travelled to New York City to deliver an address to the United Nations. It was the first time a Pope visited the Western Hemisphere. The trip attracted world attention.

His address to the UN – in French – made three points.

- He wanted to express the Catholic Church's support for the UN on its 20th anniversary and for its role as an instrument of peaceful cooperation among nations;
- He proclaimed the importance of human rights and the dignity of all persons, and specifically mentioned religious freedom (a message to those back in Rome who were obstructing the schema on religious freedom)
- He spoke of the necessity of world peace and of the horrors of war. The most striking statement in the address was "No more war! War never again!"

=== Schemas: Missions, Education, Non-Christian religions, Priests ===
The missionary activity of the Church

On 8 October, the Council Fathers began discussing the schema on the missions, completely rewritten since the last session. It stressed the importance, in a post-colonial age, of accommodation to local cultures. The basic question was: How to be Catholic without being Western? Some African bishops wanted more autonomy from Roman supervision. The schema was very well received and the discussion lasted only 3 1/2 days.

==== Christian education ====
For two days (13–14 October), the Council Fathers discussed the schema on Christian Education. It said little that was new. Like many other documents issued by Church authorities, it insisted on the importance of Catholic schools. The situation of Catholic schools varied from country to country – some were state-supported, others were not – and so it was difficult to say anything that applied to all of them. Many bishops wanted the schema rewritten, but they were told there was no time for a new text. So after two days of discussion, the schema was accepted without much enthusiasm. Close to 10% of the Council Fathers voted against it, to show their displeasure with its lack of aggiornamento. It is one of the two Vatican II documents considered something of a failure (along with the decree on the Modern Means of Communication). "Even at the last minute, dissatisfaction with the text was widespread and wide-ranging".

==== Non-Christian religions ====
The opposition to this schema that was originally about "the Jews" came from theological conservatives as well as the Arab bishops who feared repercussions from their governments. The Secretariat for Christian Unity decided to win over the Arab bishops, and succeeded in doing so by agreeing to a few textual changes during the interval between the 3rd and 4th sessions. There was also a diplomatic offensive to convince the predominantly Muslim governments in the Middle East that the schema was not just about "the Jews" since there was also a section that had positive things to say about Islam.

The various votes on the revised schema took place on 14 and 15 October. The final vote was 1,763 in favour, 250 opposed, a much better result than could have been imagined a year earlier.

==== The ministry and life of priests ====
The last of the schemas, it came before the Council Fathers on 14 October.

Two concepts of the role of priests could be discerned in the debate. The more traditional one was about the priest as sacramental minister with special powers, especially those of consecrating the bread and wine at mass and absolving penitents of their sins. This conception also stressed authority: the priest exercised authority over laypeople, just as the bishop exercised a similar authority over priests. The newer conception, the one advocated in the schema, saw the priest as someone who serves the Church and society through his leadership; in this view, the relation between priests and those they served is closer to one of friendship ("the good shepherd") and the same is true of the relationship of bishop and priest.

In the first conception, the word "priest" expresses the cultic function performed by the ordained minister. In the second conception, the preferred term is "presbyter", the term used in the early Church, because it implies more than the sacramental role suggested by "priest". The presbyter shares in the threefold ministry of Christ: he is prophet (preacher of the Word of God), priest (minister of the sacraments) and king (leader of the community). Instead of the traditional conception that his main function was celebrating mass and hearing confession, the schema stated that his primary duty was proclaiming the Gospel to all.

The one important issue the schema did not address was that of compulsory celibacy for priests of the Latin Church. On 11 October, two days before the schema was to be discussed, Pope Paul preempted the debate by announcing he was withdrawing the issue of celibacy from the conciliar agenda. Bishops who wished to address the issue could send their comments in writing to him. It was expected the Pope would hand the issue to a special committee. But no committee was ever set up, and in 1967 Pope Paul issued Sacerdotalis caelibatus, the encyclical maintaining clerical celibacy for Latin priests.

The schema was approved in principle on 16 October, and after further voting on amendments, it received final approval on 12 November.

=== A change of pace ===
By Saturday 16 October, the end of the session's fifth week, 5 schemas had received final approval, and the remaining ones had all been accepted in principle. Things were moving along faster than expected. And the Fathers were suffering from Council fatigue. So the sixth week of the session (17–24 October) was declared a holiday from conciliar work, and everyone was able to relax. When the Fathers returned on 25 October, debates were over: since all remaining schemas had been accepted in principle, the only work left for the General Congregations was to vote on the amendments as the schemas were returned by the respective Commissions.

There was a Public Session on 28 October, when the 5 schemas approved so far became documents of Vatican II: the decrees on the renewal of religious life Perfectae caritatis, on Christian Education Gravissimum educationis, on the pastoral office of bishops Christus Dominus, on Priestly Training Optatam totius, and the declaration on Non-Christian Religions Nostra aetate.

There were no General Congregations during the following week (31 Oct – 7 Nov), because the Commissions were falling behind in their work of sifting through all the proposed amendments and revising the schemas before sending them back to the Council Fathers. So the eighth week of the Fourth Session was devoted exclusively to Commission work, as their members worked feverishly to clear the backlog of amendments.

=== Voting on the last schemas ===
After the Council Fathers' second one-week break, there were 3 1/2 weeks of practically non-stop voting on the 6 remaining schemas: for each one, there were multiple votes on amendments, then on chapters and finally on the whole schema. In the course of those weeks, the six remaining schemas received their final approval.

Last-minute moves were sometimes successful in winning over opponents, sometimes not. On religious freedom, the Pope urged the Secretariat for Christian unity to take into account the wishes of the schema's opponents in the hope the final vote might be almost unanimous. The Secretariat made some changes, but the opponents were not swayed and 11% of the Fathers voted against the schema. On the matter of Tradition in the schema on Revelation, the conservatives realized they could do no better than the compromise formula "The Church does not draw her certainty for all revealed truths from Scripture alone": as a result, many of them chose to accept the schema and there were only 27 negative votes on the day of final approval. For the schema on the Lay Apostolate, the Pope sent 12 amendments to the Commission responsible for the schema. They were basically matters of wording: the Commission accepted some, and dropped others, and the schema was adopted with only 2 negative votes.

As for the schema on the Church in the Modern World, it still avoided saying anything about contraception (because a papal commission was studying the matter). Some conservatives began lobbying the Pope to step in. On 24 November, Cardinal Ottaviani received a letter from Paul VI insisting that the schema had to condemn the use of contraception; leaving the matter open as the schema did would suggest the Church was ready to change its position. The Doctrinal Commission decided to include in the schema references to previous papal rejections of contraception, but not to issue any condemnation of its own. The Pope was satisfied with this solution. Nevertheless, when time came for final approval, the opposition stayed firm: 11% of the Council Fathers still rejected the schema.

In the midst of all this voting, there was another public session on 18 November, and two of the remaining schemas became the Dogmatic Constitution on Divine Revelation Dei verbum and the decree on the Apostolate of the Laity Apostolicam actuositatem.

=== Indulgences ===
One of the issues some bishops wanted discussed at the council was that of indulgences, but the topic never made it onto the conciliar agenda. A month after his being elected pope in the summer of 1963, Paul VI set up a commission to study the issue. The commission produced a report suggesting a mild modernization of the practice of indulgences, but no important changes.

Once it became clear that the workload of the fourth period would be less than originally expected, the Pope decided to use some of the available time to ask the national groups of bishops for their reaction to the report. 10 November and succeeding days were set aside for responses. Eleven national groups delivered oral responses in the council hall, and 12 others written responses. The Italian and Spanish bishops were favourable to the report, while most others were highly critical: they cast doubt on the theological foundation of indulgences, and suggested a complete reform of the system, some even urging outright abolition. Patriarch Maximos IV insisted there was no evidence of indulgences during the first millennium. The presentations were cut short after 2 days. Two years later, Pope Paul would decree a modest reform of the system of indulgences, while insisting on their importance.

=== Final days ===
On 4 December, Pope Paul took part in an ecumenical prayer service with the hundred or so non-Catholic observers present at the council in the Basilica of Saint Paul outside the Walls. It was the first time a Pope had prayed publicly with non-Catholic Christians, something unthinkable just a few years earlier.

On 6 December, there were speeches at St. Peter's thanking everyone who had taken part in the council. Each Council Father received a gold ring to commemorate the historic event. The Pope declared a jubilee from 8 December to Pentecost 1966 (later extended to 8 December 1966) to urge all Catholics to study and accept the decisions of the council and apply them in spiritual renewal. He also issued a motu proprio reforming the Holy Office. The reform was fairly minor: the office's name was changed to Congregation for the Doctrine of the Faith, and procedures were set in place ensuring that theologians accused of deviating from Church teachings would have a hearing before any action was taken against them (a procedural safeguard that did not exist up to that point).

7 December was the day for the promulgation of the 4 remaining schemas: they became the Constitution on the Church in the Modern World Gaudium et spes, the decree on the Ministry and Life of Priests Presbyterorum ordinis, the decree on the Missionary Activity of the Church Ad gentes, and the declaration on religious freedom Dignitatis humanae.

Before the promulgation, the Council Fathers witnessed a moving moment in the history of Christianity. A Joint Declaration by Pope Paul and Patriarch Athenagoras of Constantinople was read out, deploring the mutual excommunications of 1054 which resulted in the Great Schism between the Catholic and Eastern Orthodox Churches, recognizing the responsibility of both parties for the separation and promising to work for complete communion between the two Churches. This was followed by the reading of the Pope's Apostolic Letter lifting the Catholic Church's excommunication of the Orthodox in 1054. At the same time, in the Patriarchal cathedral in Istanbul, the Joint Declaration was read out in Greek and the Orthodox excommunication of the Catholics was lifted.

8 December: the final day of the council had arrived. A huge crowd, estimated at 300,000 people, gathered in St. Peter's Square for an outdoor mass closing the council. The mass was broadcast worldwide by radio and television. The Pope's homily was addressed to all humanity because for the Church "no one is a stranger, no one is excluded, no one is distant".

Mass was followed by a series of messages (in French) addressed to various categories of people, including heads of government, women, workers, young people, and the poor and sick. The Secretary General of the council then read the Apostolic Letter declaring the council concluded, and instructing that "everything the Council decreed be religiously and devoutly observed by all the faithful". The Pope gave his blessing to all present and dismissed them: "In the name of our Lord Jesus Christ, go in peace". To which all responded with enthusiasm (and probably relief): "Thanks be to God!"

== Sources ==
- Alberigo, Giuseppe (2006), A Brief History of Vatican II, translated by Sherry, Matthew, Maryknoll: Orbis Books, ISBN 1-57075-638-4
- Hahnenberg, Edward (2007), A Concise Guide to the Documents of Vatican II, City: Saint Anthony Messenger Press, ISBN 978-0-86716-552-4
- Heraty, J, ed. (1967), "Vatican Council II", New Catholic Encyclopedia, vol. XIV, Faculty of Catholic University of America (1 ed.), New York: McGraw-Hill, ISBN 978-0-07-010235-4, OCLC 34184550
- O'Malley, John W. (2008). What Happened at Vatican II. Cambridge, Massachusetts: Belknap Press of Harvard University Press. ISBN 978-0-674-04749-5.
- Ratzinger, Joseph (2009). Theological Highlights of Vatican II. New York: Paulist Press.
- Ricciardi, Andrea (1997). "The Tumultuous Opening Days of the Council". In Alberigo, Giuseppe; Komonchak, Joseph A. (eds.). History of Vatican II. Vol. II. Peeters & Orbis. pp. 1–68.
- Rynne, Xavier (1999). Vatican Council II. Orbis Books. ISBN 1-57075-293-1.
- Sullivan, Maureen (2002), 101 Questions and Answers on Vatican II, New York: Paulist Press, ISBN 0-8091-4133-7
- Wiltgen, Ralph M. (2014). The Inside Story of Vatican II. TAN books. ISBN 978-0-89555-186-3. Formerly titled The Rhine Flows into the Tiber: a History of Vatican II (1967)
- Wittstadt, Klaus (1995). "On the Eve of the Second Vatican Council (July 1–October 10, 1962)". In Alberigo, Giuseppe; Komonchak, Joseph A. (eds.). History of Vatican II. Vol. I. Peeters & Orbis. pp. 405–500.
