= Sami Aldeeb =

Palestinian-born Swiss lawyer

Sami Awad Aldeeb Abu-Sahlieh
- سامي عوض الذيب أبو ساحلية
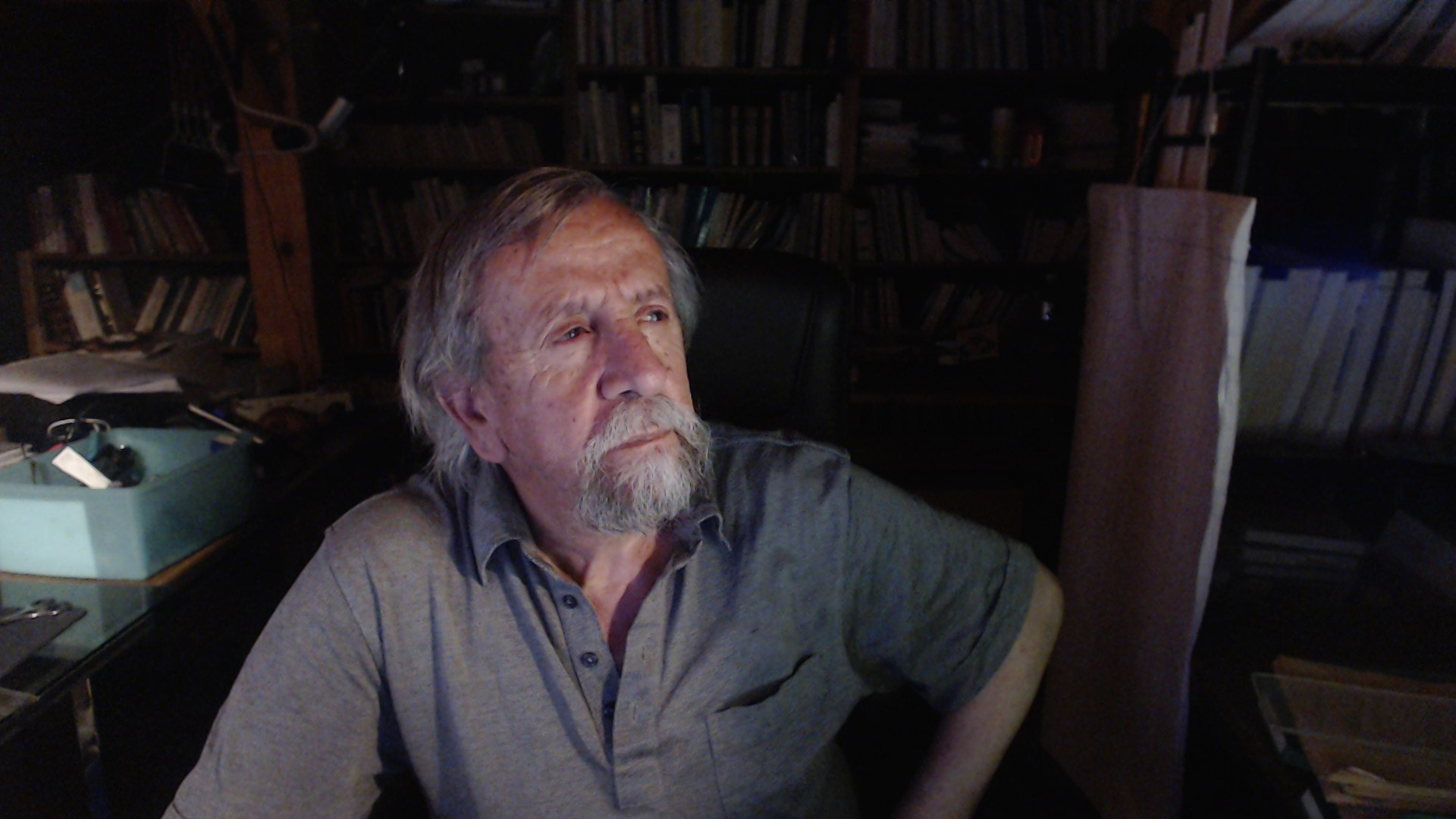
- Sami Aldeeb in his library
- Born: 5 September 1949 (age 77); Zababdeh, West Bank
- Education: University of Fribourg
- Occupation: Lawyer
- Notable work: Qur'an in chronological order
- Website: sami-aldeeb.com

Sami Awad Aldeeb Abu-Sahlieh (in Arabic: سامي عوض الذيب أبو ساحلية / Sāmy ʿwḍ ʾĀd-dyb ʾĀbw-Sāḥlyh) (born 5 September 1949 in Zababdeh, near Jenin in the West Bank) is a Swiss Palestinian lawyer.

Aldeeb was the head of the Arab and Islamic Law department at the Swiss Institute of Comparative Law from 1980 to 2009. He now directs the Center of Arab and Islamic law and teaches at universities in Switzerland, France and Italy.

He is the author of books and articles on Arab and Islamic law. In 2008 he published a bilingual edition of the Quran (Arabic - French) classifying the chapters (surahs) in chronological order according to Al-Azhar, with reference to variations, abrogations and Jewish and Christian writings. He is currently preparing a similar edition in Italian and English. He also translated the Swiss constitution into Arabic for the Swiss Confederation.

== Early life and education ==
Born to a family of Christian peasants in Zababdeh, near Jenin, he attended primary school in his village (1956–61) before joining the Minor Seminary of the Latin Patriarchate of Jerusalem in Beit-Jala, near Bethlehem (1961–65). Four years later he left to attend a course in tailoring at the Salesian Technical School of Bethlehem (1965–1968), and worked in the tailoring trade in Jenin while, at the same time, working for the International Committee of the Red Cross. In 1970, he matriculated at Jenin as a self-taught student, and thereafter obtained a scholarship from the l'Œuvre Saint-Justin in Fribourg, to study in Switzerland.

In April 1974, he received his law degree from the University of Fribourg, and then went on to study for a doctorate of Laws at the University of Fribourg and enrolled in the Graduate Institute of International Studies at Geneva to simultaneously study for an Honours degree in Political Science. He was awarded a degree from the Graduate Institute at Geneva in January 1976.

== Career ==
Researching for his doctoral thesis, he spent a year in Egypt. He defended his thesis in December 1978 at the Faculty of Law in Fribourg. During his studies he received a grant from l'Œuvre Saint-Justin in Fribourg (1970–1977) and a grant from the Swiss Confederation (1977–1979). He was a federal civil servant at the Swiss Institute of Comparative Law in Lausanne from 1980 to 2009, heading the Department of Arab and Islamic law. In 2009, he opened his own Center of Arab and Islamic law.

== Teaching and conferences ==
Aldeeb taught Arab and Islamic Law in various universities.

== Positions ==
He expressed various positions critical of Islam, for example, he positioned himself for a ban on the erection of minarets in Switzerland, since in his opinion the constitution allows prayer, but not shouting. He holds the theory that the Quran was written by a rabbi. Aldeeb is highly critical of both male circumcision and female genital mutilation.

== Awards ==
- 21 November 2009: Elected Academician of "Studium - Accademia di Casale Monferrato e per l'Arte del, the Letteratura the Storia, the e Scienze the Umanità Varies."

== Publications ==
Aldeeb’s publications consist of about thirty books and more than 200 articles on Arab and Islamic Law, in various languages:

- Le Coran, texte arabe et traduction française par ordre chronologique avec renvoi aux variantes, aux abrogations et aux écrits juifs et chrétiens (2e ed.). Charleston: Createspace (Amazon). 2016.
- The Koran: Arabic text with the English translation in chronological order according to the Azhar with reference to variations, abrogations and Jewish and Christian writings. Charleston: Createspace (Amazon). 2016.
- Il Corano: Testo arabo e traduzione italiana: per ordine cronologico secondo l'Azhar con rinvio alle varianti, alle abrogazioni ed agli scritti ebraici e cristiani. Charleston: Createspace (Amazon). 2017.
- Koran in Arabic in chronological order: Koufi, Normal and Koranic orthographies with modern punctuation, references to variations, abrogations and ... and stylistic mistakes (Arabic ed.). Createspace (Amazon). 29 April 2016.
- Al-Akhta' al-lughawiyyah fi al-Qur'an al-karim: Linguistic Errors in the Holy Koran (Arabic ed.). Createspace (Amazon). 2 January 2017.
- La Fatiha et la culture de la haine: Interprétation du 7e verset à travers les siècles, Createspace (Amazon), Charleston, 2014
- Zakat, corruption et jihad: Interprétation du verset coranique 9:60 à travers les siècles, Createspace (Amazon), Charleston, 2015
- Alliance, désaveu et dissimulation: Interprétation des versets coraniques 3:28-29 à travers les siècles, Createspace (Amazon), Charleston, 2015
- Nulle contrainte dans la religion: Interprétation du verset coranique 2:256 à travers les siècles, Createspace (Amazon), Charleston, 2015
- Le jihad dans l’islam: Interprétation des versets coraniques relatifs au jihad à travers les siècles, Createspace (Amazon), Charleston, 2016
- Le droit des peuples à disposer d’eux-mêmes, étude analytique de la doctrine marxiste-léniniste et de la position soviétique, polycopié, IUHEI, 1976
- Discriminations contre les non-juifs tant chrétiens que musulmans en Israël, Pax Christi, Lausanne, Pâques 1992
- Le droit musulman de la famille et des successions à l’épreuve des ordres juridiques occidentaux, Sami Aldeeb et Andrea Bonomi (éd.), Publications de l’Institut suisse de droit comparé, Schulthess, Zürich, 1999
- Les sanctions en droit musulman: passé, présent et avenir, Cahiers de l’Orient chrétien 6, CEDRAC (USJ), Beyrouth, 2007
- Demain les islamistes au pouvoir? Conception musulmane de la loi et son impact en Occident, Association culturelle du Razès, Montréal d’Aude (France), 2009
- Discriminations contre les non-juifs tant chrétiens que musulmans en Israël, Pax Christi, Lausanne, Pâques 1992
- Non-musulmans en pays d’Islam: cas de l’Egypte, Createspace (Amazon), Charleston, 2e édition, 2012
- Les musulmans face aux droits de l’homme: religion & droit & politique, étude et documents, Verlag Dr. Dieter Winkler, P.O.Box 102665, D-44726 Bochum, 1994
- Les mouvements islamistes et les droits de l’homme, in Herausforderungen Historisch-politische Analysen, Winkler, Bochum, 1998: Winkler
- Avenir des musulmans en Occident: cas de la Suisse, Createspace (Amazon), Charleston, 2e édition, 2012
- Cimetière musulman en Occident: Normes juives, chrétiennes et musulmanes, Createspace (Amazon), Charleston, 2e édition, 2012
- Circoncision masculine et féminine: Débat religieux, médical, social et juridique, Createspace (Amazon), Charleston, 2e édition, 2012
- Circoncision: Le complot du silence, Createspace (Amazon), Charleston, 2e édition, 2012
- Droit musulman et modernité: diagnostiques et remèdes, Createspace (Amazon), Charleston, 2014
- Introduction au droit arabe: droit de la famille et des successions, droit pénal, droit médical, droit socio-économique, Createspace (Amazon), Charleston, 2e édition, 2012
- Introduction au droit musulman: Fondements, sources et principes, Createspace (Amazon), Charleston, 2e édition, 2012
- L’Islam et la destruction des statues: Étude comparée sur l’art figuratif en droit juif, chrétien et musulman, Createspace (Amazon), Charleston, 2015
- Le changement de religion en Egypte, Createspace (Amazon), Charleston, 2013
- Le contrat d’entreprise en droit arabe: cas de l’Égypte: avec les dispositions des principaux codes arabes en différentes langues, Createspace (Amazon), Charleston, 2e édition, 2012
- Les musulmans en Occident entre droits et devoirs, Createspace (Amazon), Charleston, 2e édition, 2012
- Les successions en droit musulman: cas de l’Egypte: présentation, versets coraniques et dispositions légales, Createspace (Amazon), Charleston, 2e édition, 2012
- Manuel de droit musulman et arabe, Createspace (Amazon), Charleston, 2e édition, 2012
- Mariages mixtes avec des musulmans: Cas de la Suisse avec modèle de contrat en six langues, Createspace (Amazon), Charleston, 2e édition, 2012
- Projets de constitutions islamiques et déclarations des droits de l’homme dans le monde arabo-musulman, Createspace (Amazon), Charleston, 2e édition, 2012
