= Salt of the Earth: Palestinian Christians in the Northern West Bank =

2004 series of documentary short films

- Salt of the Earth: Palestinian Christians in the Northern West Bank DVD
- Directed by: Marthame Sanders; Elizabeth Sanders
- Produced by: Marthame Sanders; Elizabeth Sanders
- Edited by: Marthame Sanders
- Distributed by: Salt Films, Inc.
- Release date: 2004 (USA)
- Running time: 193 minutes
- Languages: English; Arabic

Salt of the Earth: Palestinian Christians in the Northern West Bank is a series of documentary short films examining the lives of nine Palestinian Christians living in and around the cities of Jenin and Nablus. Released by Salt Films, Inc., in 2004, the film was produced by Presbyterian missionaries Marthame and Elizabeth Sanders while they lived and worked in the Palestinian Christian village of Zababdeh.
