= Zababdeh =

Town in the State of Palestine, in the northern West Bank

- Municipality type D (Village council)

Arabic transcription(s)
  - Arabic: الزبابدة
  - Latin: al-Zababida (official) az-Zubabdeh (unofficial)
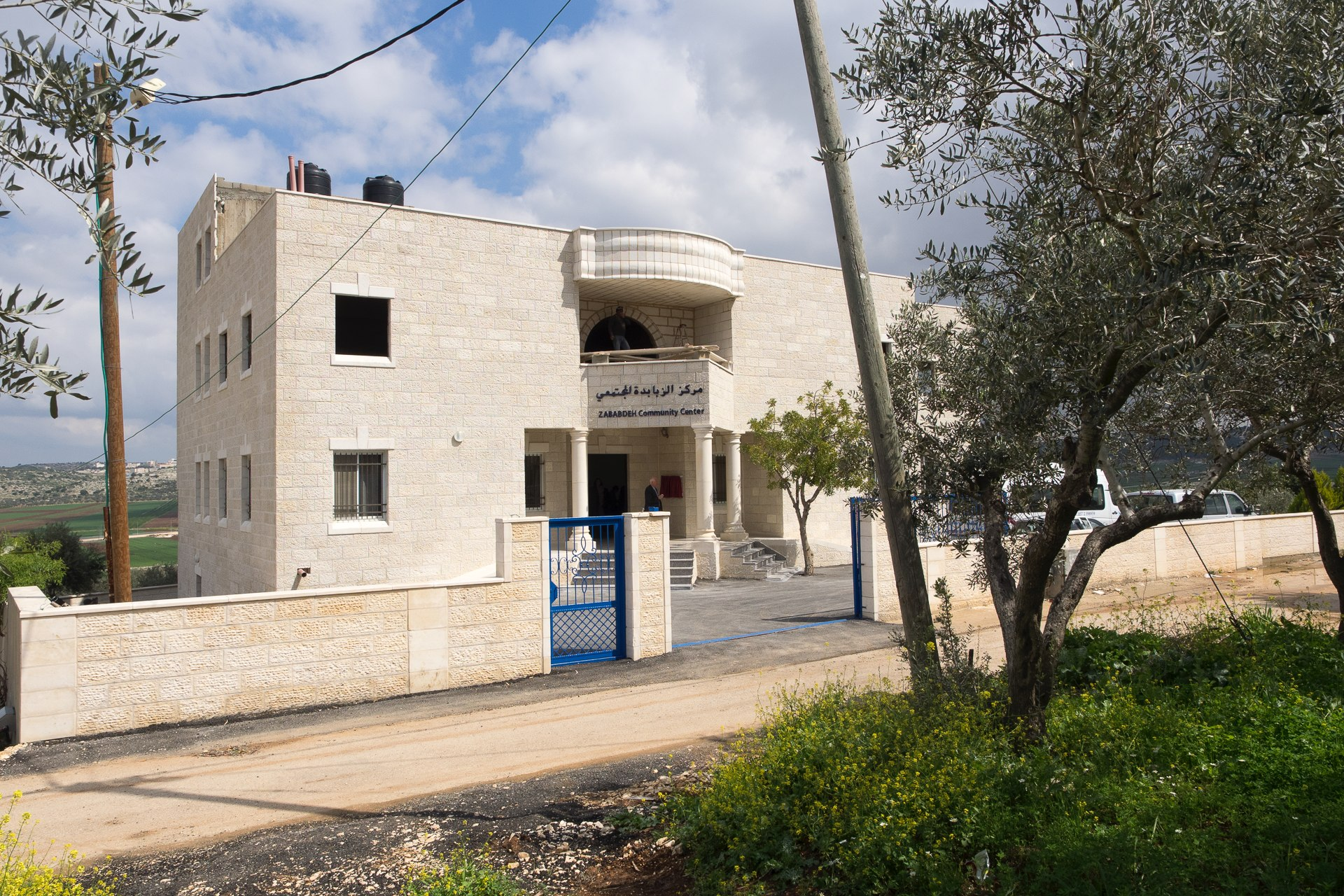
- Zababdeh Community Center

- Location of Zababdeh within Palestine
- Coordinates: 32°23′07″N 35°19′24″E
- Palestine grid: 180/199
- State: Palestine
- Governorate: Jenin

Government
  - Type: Village council (from 1995)

Area
  - Total: 5.7 km^{2} (2.2 sq mi)

Population (2017)
  - Total: 4,261
  - Density: 750/km^{2} (1,900/sq mi)
- Name meaning: from "froth" or "civet"
- Website: www.zababdeh.ps

Zababdeh or Zababida (Arabic: الزبابدة) is a town in the State of Palestine, in the northern West Bank, located 15 kilometres (9.3 miles) southeast of Jenin and 2 kilometres (1.2 miles) from the Arab American University.

== History ==
Sherds from the Middle Bronze Age II, Iron Age I and II, through to the Byzantine Empire era have been found at the site.

Remains of a Frankish bovaria (=farm) has been noted, while sherds from the Mamluk and Ottoman era have also been found.

=== Ottoman era ===
The village was (re-)founded in 1834, during the Ottoman era, by three Christian Greek Orthodox families who purchased the land from Jenin Muslims. In 1838 "Zabedet" was noted as a Greek Christian village in the Haritheh area, north of Nablus.

In 1882, the PEF's Survey of Western Palestine (SWP) described it as a "moderate sized village at the south edge of the arable plain called Wady es Selhab, supplied by a well on the east, with a low hill covered with brushwood on the south." The Latin Catholic mission established its presence in the village in 1883.

In the 19th century sister Marie-Alphonsine Danil Ghattas lived here.

=== British Mandate era ===
In the 1922 census of Palestine, conducted by the British Mandate authorities, Zababdeh had a population of 482; 64 Muslims and 418 Christians, where the Christians were 83 Orthodox, 261 Roman Catholics and 74 Church of England. In the 1931 census the number of inhabitants had increased to 632; 91 Muslims and 541 Christians, in a total of 134 houses.

In 1945 Village Statistics Zababida had a population of 870; 90 Muslims and 780 Christians, and the jurisdiction of the village was 5,719 dunams of land, according to an official land and population survey. 2,510 dunams were used for plantations and irrigable land, 3,067 dunams for cereals, while 16 dunams were built-up (urban) land.

=== Jordanian era ===
After the 1948 Arab-Israeli War, Zababdeh was ruled by the Hashemites of Jordan.

In 1961, the population of Zababide was 1,474, of whom 1,077 were Christian.

=== Post-1967 ===
Zababdeh came under Israeli occupation along with the rest of the West Bank during the 1967 Six-Day War. The population of Kufeir Zababida in the 1967 census conducted by Israel was 1,520, of whom 329 originated from the Israeli territory.

According to the Palestinian Central Bureau of Statistics 2007 census, there were 3,665 residents, of which roughly two-thirds are Christians, divided into Roman Catholic (Latin), Greek Orthodox, Greek Catholic and Anglican communities. For two decades, from 1974–75 until he was posted to a position as parish priest in Gaza in 1995, the village priest was Manuel Musallam, a Fatah activist and native of Birzeit, who developed excellent educational facilities in the village that attracted commuting Muslim students from Jenin. The city also has a Muslim minority; both communities live without conflicts.

== Families ==
- Awwad
- Dawoud
- Daibes
- Diab
- Esaid (Saeed)
- Kasbari
- Khalil Ibrahim
- Sharqawi
- Turkman
- Two Khoury families related only by marriage
- Abu-Zaineh
- Antabil
- Abu Sahliya
- Obaid
- Musallam

== In media ==
Zababdeh was featured in a short film Salt of the Earth: Palestinian Christians in the Northern West Bank, which examined the lives of nine Palestinian Christians living in and around the cities of Jenin and Nablus. Released by Salt Films, Inc., in 2004, the film was produced by Presbyterian missionaries Marthame and Elizabeth Sanders while they lived and worked in the Palestinian Christian village of Zababdeh.

== Twin towns – sister cities ==
Zababdeh is twinned with:

- Ixelles, Belgium
- Graz, Austria

== See also ==
- Khouloud Daibes
- Palestinian Christians
- Salt of the Earth: Palestinian Christians in the Northern West Bank

== Bibliography ==
- Barron, J.B., ed. (1923). Palestine: Report and General Abstracts of the Census of 1922. Government of Palestine.
- Conder, C.R.; Kitchener, H.H. (1882). The Survey of Western Palestine: Memoirs of the Topography, Orography, Hydrography, and Archaeology. Vol. 2. London: Committee of the Palestine Exploration Fund.
- Ellenblum, R. (2003). Frankish Rural Settlement in the Latin Kingdom of Jerusalem. Cambridge University Press. ISBN 9780521521871. (p. 125)
- Government of Jordan, Department of Statistics (1964). First Census of Population and Housing. Volume I: Final Tables; General Characteristics of the Population (PDF).
- Government of Palestine, Department of Statistics (1945). Village Statistics, April, 1945.
- Hadawi, S. (1970). Village Statistics of 1945: A Classification of Land and Area ownership in Palestine. Palestine Liberation Organization Research Center.
- Irving, Sarah (2012). Palestine. Bradt Travel Guides. ISBN 9781841623672.
- Mills, E., ed. (1932). Census of Palestine 1931. Population of Villages, Towns and Administrative Areas. Jerusalem: Government of Palestine.
- Palmer, E.H. (1881). The Survey of Western Palestine: Arabic and English Name Lists Collected During the Survey by Lieutenants Conder and Kitchener, R. E. Transliterated and Explained by E.H. Palmer. Committee of the Palestine Exploration Fund.
- Robinson, E.; Smith, E. (1841). Biblical Researches in Palestine, Mount Sinai and Arabia Petraea: A Journal of Travels in the year 1838. Vol. 3. Boston: Crocker & Brewster.
- Zertal, A. (2007). The Manasseh Hill Country Survey. Vol. 2. Boston: BRILL. ISBN 978-9004163690.
