= Embassy of Palestine, Holy See =

Diplomatic mission of the State of Palestine to Vatican City

Embassy of the State of Palestine to the Holy See سفارة دولة فلسطين لدى حاضرة الفاتيكان
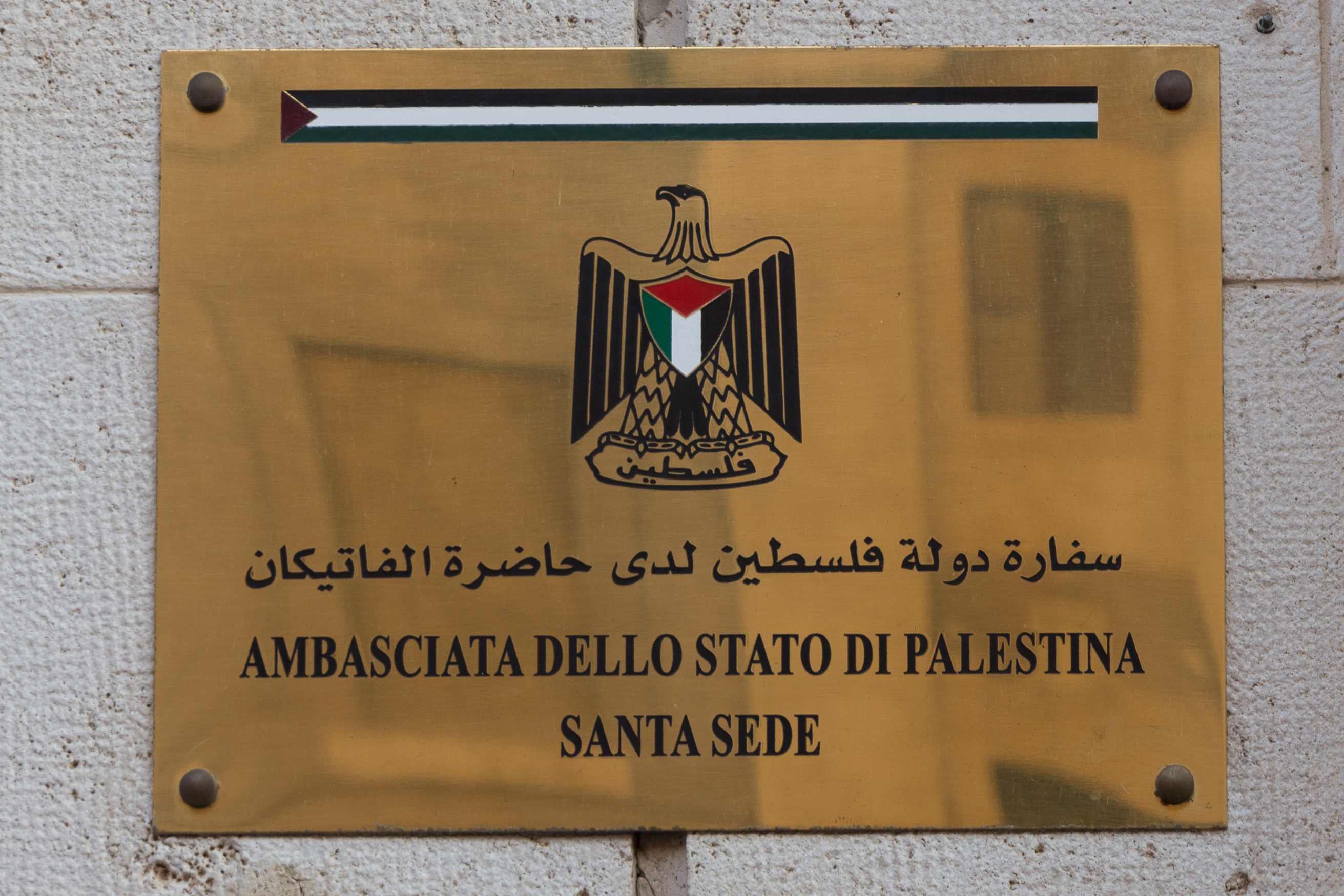
- Location: Rome, adjacent to Vatican City
- Coordinates: 41.9042°N 12.4578°E
- Ambassador: Issa Kassissieh

The Embassy of the State of Palestine to the Holy See (Arabic: سفارة دولة فلسطين لدى حاضرة الفاتيكان; Italian: Ambasciata dello Stato di Palestina presso la Santa Sede) is the diplomatic mission of Palestine in Vatican City. It was opened on 14 January 2017. It is located in an office building overlooking Vatican City.

The Palestinian ambassador to the Holy See is Issa Kassissieh.

== List of representatives ==
Name	Term begin	Term end	President	Notes
Afif Safieh	1995	2005	Yasser Arafat	
Shawqi Armali	2007	2012	Mahmoud Abbas	Appointed in 2007.
Issa Kassissieh	2013	Incumbent	Mahmoud Abbas	Embassy opened in 2017.

== See also ==
- List of diplomatic missions of Palestine
- Apostolic Nunciature to Israel
