= Statement on the 500th anniversary of the Protestant Reformation =

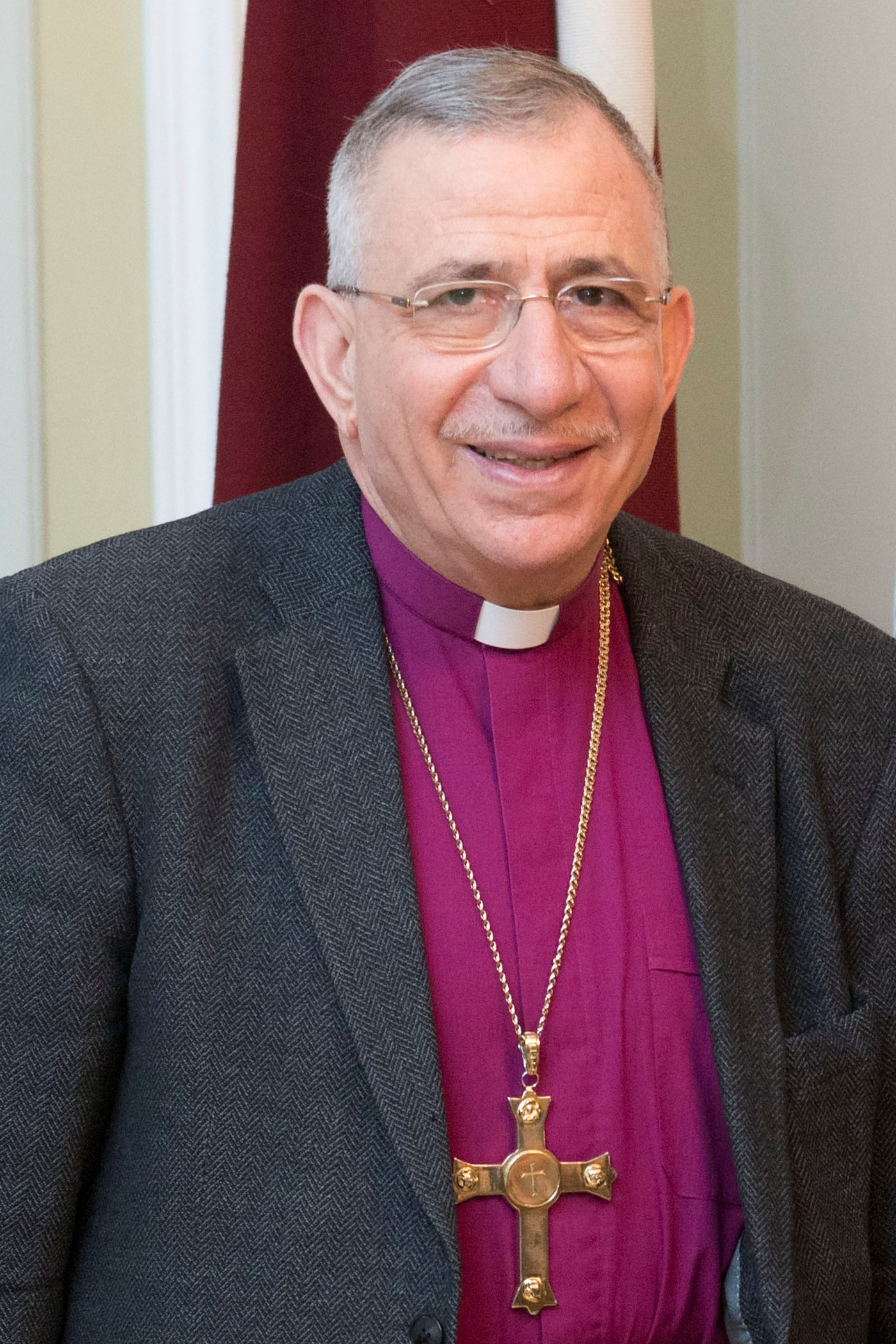
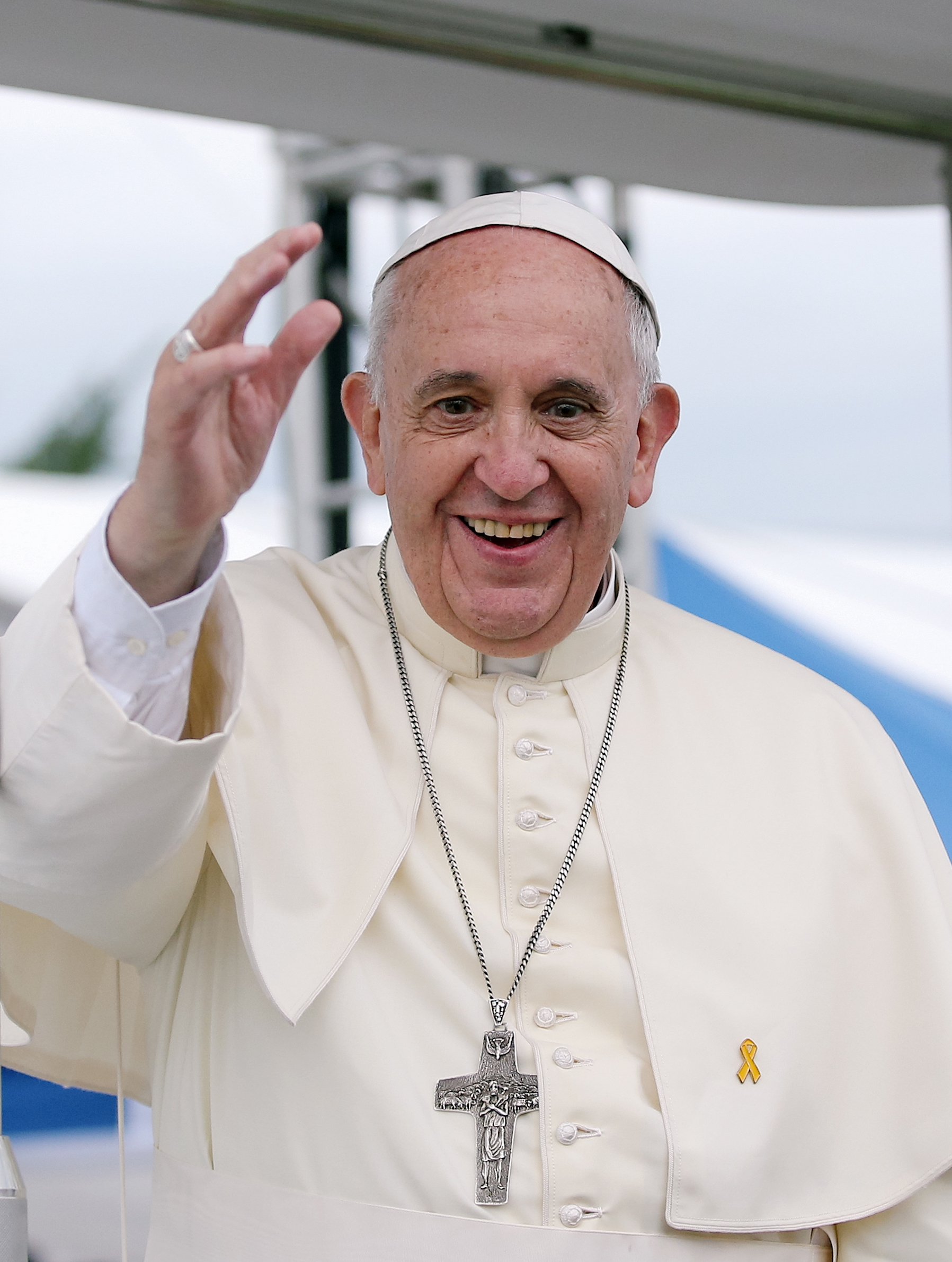
Munib Younan (left) in 2015 and Pope Francis (right) in 2014

The Statement on the 500th anniversary of the Protestant Reformation was signed by Pope Francis, leaders of the Catholic Church and Bishop Munib Younan, president of the Lutheran World Federation, on 31 October 2016 during a Protestant Reformation Day traditional service at the Lund Cathedral in Lund, Sweden.

This was the first time leaders of the Catholic Church had met representatives of the Lutheran World Federation as part of a commemoration of the Protestant Reformation Day. Pope Francis explicitly stated that it was not a "celebration" because of the schism that had resulted; rather, he termed it a "commemoration" in order to pursue a dialogue with the Lutheran Protestants. The traditional service heralded 12 months of events leading up to the 500th anniversary in 2017 of Martin Luther publishing his 95 theses in Wittenberg, Germany.

== See also ==
- Catholic–Orthodox Joint Declaration of 1965
