= Issa Kassissieh =

Palestinian diplomat

Issa Jamil Kassissieh

Ambassador of Palestine to the Holy See and to the Sovereign Military Order of Malta
- Incumbent
- Assumed office October 2013
- Preceded by: Shawqi Armali

Personal details
- Born: 1964 (age 61–62) East Jerusalem

Issa Jamil Kassissieh (born 1964) is a Palestinian scholar and diplomat, who since October 2013 serves as Palestinian ambassador to the Holy See and to the Sovereign Military Order of Malta. He currently serves as the Palestinian ambassador for Armenia since February 24, 2026.

== Early life ==
Kassissieh was born in East Jerusalem into a Greek-Orthodox family. He studied English literature at Bethlehem University, international relations at Birzeit University, public administration at the Kennedy School of Government and diplomacy at the University of Birmingham.

== Diplomatic career ==
Kassissieh served in various positions involving negotiations on behalf of the PLO and the Palestinian Authority. He served as director of International Relations department at the Orient House, Jerusalem. Later, he joined the staff of Negotiations Affairs Department of the Palestinian Authority, and was mostly involved in negotiations with churches and on issues relating to the problem of Jerusalem. He was appointed Palestinian ambassador to the Holy See in January 2017.

He currently serves as the Palestinian ambassador for Armenia since February 24, 2026.
