= Catholic–Orthodox Joint Declaration of 1965 =

Withdrawal of historic excommunications

The Catholic–Orthodox Joint Declaration of 1965 was read out on 7 December 1965, simultaneously at a public meeting of the Second Vatican Council in Rome, and at a special ceremony in Istanbul. It withdrew the exchange of excommunications between prominent ecclesiastics in the Holy See and the Ecumenical Patriarchate of Constantinople, commonly known as the Great Schism of 1054. While it did not end the schism, it showed a desire for greater reconciliation between the two churches, represented by Pope Paul VI and Ecumenical Patriarch Athenagoras I.

Metropolitan Philaret (Voznesensky) of the Russian Orthodox Church Outside of Russia openly challenged the Patriarch's efforts at rapprochement with the Roman Catholic Church, claiming that it would inevitably lead to heresy, in his 1965 epistle to the Patriarch.

== See also ==
- Joint Declaration of Pope Francis and Bishop Munib Younan
