= Ralph M. Wiltgen =

Ralph Michael Wiltgen (17 December 1921, in Evanston, Illinois, USA – 6 December 2007) was an American Catholic priest, missionary and journalist specially famous for writing the book The Rhine Flows Into the Tiber, an account of the Second Vatican Council.

== Life ==
Born in Chicago in 1921, Wiltgen became a Divine Word Missionary in 1938 and received Holy Orders in 1950. He was the author of several books about the Catholic Church, including The Religious Life Defined, Founding of the Roman Catholic Church in Oceania, 1825–50 and Gold Coast Mission History. Wiltgen was present in Rome during the sessions of Vatican II. Given the poor performance by Vatican Press Office, Wiltgen started his own office called "Divine Word News Service" that had 3100 subscribers in 108 countries. He died in 2007.

== The Rhine Flows Into the Tiber ==
He is especially famous because of his account of the proceedings of the Second Vatican Council. He holds the theory that the council was a theological dispute that pitted the churches of the countries where the Rhine flows (Austria, Germany, France, Switzerland, Netherlands and Belgium, which were more liberal), against other churches (Spanish-speaking, Portuguese-speaking, English-speaking and Italian, which were more traditionalist). He took the name of the book from a phrase by 2nd-century Roman writer Juvenal "It seems as if the Orontes flows into the Tiber", complaining of too much cultural influence from Syria into Rome. The book received the Nihil Obstat and Imprimatur in 1966 by later cardinal Terence Cooke though many members of the Church appeared under a grim light.

Several editions of the book have been published, the most recent by TAN Books in 2014 under the title The Inside Story of Vatican II.
