= Comprehensive Agreement between the Holy See and Palestine =

2015 agreement establishing diplomatic relations

The Comprehensive Agreement between the Holy See and Palestine is an agreement signed on 26 June 2015 between the Holy See and the Palestinian Authority, representing Palestine, through which the Holy See (which governs the Vatican City State) recognized Palestine as an independent state and established diplomatic relations with it.

The agreement followed the Basic Agreement between the Holy See and the Palestine Liberation Organization (PLO) that had been signed on 15 February 2000. It regulates the rights and obligations of the Catholic Church in areas of the Palestinian National Authority, and reflects the Holy See's recognition of a Palestinian independent state.

== Historical background ==
The Holy See has been an ardent supporter of the Palestinian political struggle for an independent state since 1967. This support, in addition to the desire to gain support for the Catholic Church from within the Palestinian community in the Palestinian territories under Israeli control, led to a process of gradually growing cooperation between the Holy See and the PLO, and later also the Palestinian authority. One such step was the meeting of Pope John Paul II and PLO chairman Yasser Arafat in 1987. Following the establishment of the Palestinian Authority under the Oslo Accords, the Holy See embarked on negotiations with the Palestinian leadership to regulate Catholic Church activities in areas under Palestinian control. This was done in parallel with negotiations with the Israel to the same effect in Israeli controlled territories. Relations of special nature not defined as "diplomatic" were established between the Holy See and PLO on 26 October 1994.

Negotiations between the Holy See and the PLO led to the signing of a Basic Agreement on 15 February 2000, which committed the PLO to respect freedom of religion in general, as well as freedom of action for Catholic communities and establishments under Palestinian control. A more comprehensive agreement was concluded on 26 June 2015, with effect on 2 January 2016.

== Provisions of the agreement ==
The Comprehensive Agreement between the Holy See and Palestine consists of a preamble and 32 articles dealing with general principles of freedom of religion, organizational rights of the Catholic Church in Palestinian Authority areas, respect for holy places and personal status of Catholics. Its preamble shows support for Palestinian aspirations of independence by recognizing a "State of Palestine" that consists of all the West Bank and the Gaza Strip, including East Jerusalem. This stipulation has angered the Israeli government, that does not recognize the State of Palestine.

== Regional reactions ==
=== Israel ===
The Israeli government has deplored the conclusion of the 2015 agreement. Israeli Ministry of Foreign Affairs spokesman termed it as one-sided for not recognizing the rights of the Jewish people in what it termed "Land of Israel" as well as not taking into consideration the places in Jerusalem holy for Judaism. The Israeli statement also claimed that recognizing the Palestinian Authority as a state damages the peace process by strengthening Palestinian refusal to negotiate.

== See also ==
- Holy See–Palestine relations

== Bibliography ==
- Hammer, Leonard (4 January 2017). "The 2015 Comprehensive Agreement Between the Holy See and the Palestinian Authority: Discerning the Holy See's Approach to International Relations in the Holy Land". Oxford Journal of Law and Religion. 6 (1). Oxford University Press (published February 2017): 162–179. doi:10.1093/ojlr/rww058. ISSN 2047-0770.
- Comprehensive Agreement between the State of Palestine and the Holy See [Santa Sede, Accordo generale, Palestina / Palestine, Comprehensive Agreement, Holy See] (PDF). 26 June 2015. btcaqf. Archived from the original on 2017-05-06.
