= Ante Jozić =

Croatian prelate of the Catholic Church (born 1967)

His Excellency, The Most Reverend Ante Jozić
- Apostolic Nuncio to Armenia and Georgia; Titular Archbishop of Cissa
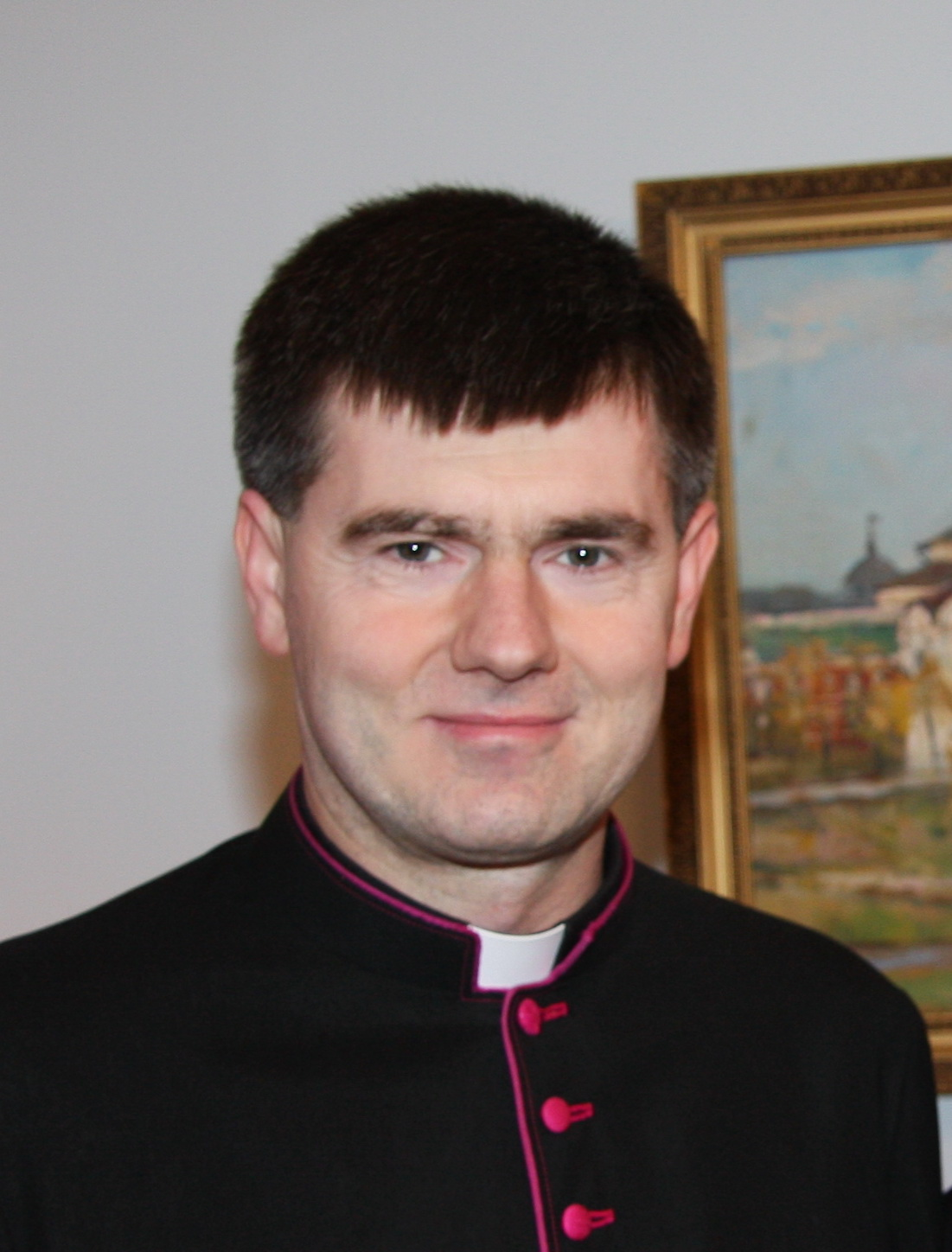
- Church: Roman Catholic Church
- Appointed: 28 June 2024
- Predecessor: José Avelino Bettencourt
- Other post: Titular Archbishop of Cissa
- Previous posts: Apostolic Nuncio to Belarus (2020-2024); Apostolic Nuncio to Côte d'Ivoire (2019) (Note: Pope Francis named Ante Jozić Apostolic Nuncio to the Ivory Coast on 2 February 2019. His consecration as bishop, scheduled for 1 May, was postponed after Jozić was seriously injured in a car accident in Croatia on 7 April.); Head of Holy See Study Mission, Hong Kong (2009–2019)

Orders
- Ordination: 28 June 1986 by Ante Jurić
- Consecration: 16 September 2020 by Pietro Parolin, Marin Barišić and Dražen Kutleša

Personal details
- Born: 16 January 1967 (age 59)
- Denomination: Roman Catholic
- Motto: In Te Domine speravi
- Coat of arms: Ante Jozić's coat of arms

Ordination history of Ante Jozić
History
Diaconal ordination
- Ordained by: Ante Jurić
- Date: 15 December 1991
Priestly ordination
- Ordained by: Ante Jurić
- Date: 28 June 1992
Episcopal consecration
- Principal consecrator: Pietro Parolin
- Co-consecrators: Marin Barišić; Dražen Kutleša
- Date: 16 September 2020

Styles of Ante Jozić
- Reference style: His Excellency; The Most Reverend
- Spoken style: Your Excellency
- Religious style: Archbishop

Ante Jozić (born 16 January 1967) is a Croatian prelate of the Catholic Church. He has worked in the diplomatic service of the Holy See since 1999. Though appointed as apostolic nuncio and titular archbishop in 2019, injuries suffered in a traffic accident prevented him from being consecrated and taking up his post. His episcopal consecration was postponed a second time because of the COVID-19 pandemic. He was finally consecrated on 16 September 2020.

== Biography ==
Ante Jozić was born in Trilj, Croatia, on 16 January 1967. He was ordained a priest on 28 June 1992 and became a priest of the Diocese of Split.

He obtained a doctorate in civil and canon law.

== Diplomatic career ==
To prepare for a diplomatic career he entered the Pontifical Ecclesiastical Academy in 1995. He entered the diplomatic service of the Holy See on 1 July 1999 and worked at the apostolic nunciatures in India, the Russian Federation, and the Philippines, and for ten years in Hong Kong as head of the Holy See Study Mission for China.

Pope Francis appointed Jozić titular archbishop of Cissa and Apostolic Nuncio to Côte d'Ivoire on 2 February 2019. His episcopal consecration, scheduled for 1 May, was postponed after Jozić was seriously injured in a car accident in Croatia on 7 April. He was released from the hospital on 20 June. On 28 October, Paolo Borgia was appointed in his stead.

Jozić had an audience with Pope Francis on 22 January 2020 and remained a titular archbishop-elect. His episcopal ordination was initially rescheduled for 21 March 2020, but was postponed again pending the rescinding of restrictions on mass gatherings due to the 2019–20 coronavirus pandemic. He was appointed Apostolic Nuncio to Belarus on 21 May 2020. Jozić was ultimately consecrated bishop on 16 September 2020 in Solin, Croatia, with Pietro Parolin, the Cardinal Secretary of State, serving as the principal consecrator.

On 28 June 2024, he was appointed apostolic nuncio to Armenia and Georgia.

== See also ==
- List of heads of the diplomatic missions of the Holy See

Diplomatic posts
Preceded by Joseph Spiteri	Apostolic Nuncio to Ivory Coast (appointed but did not assume post); 2 February 2019 – 28 October 2019	Succeeded by Paolo Borgia
Preceded by Gábor Pintér	Apostolic Nuncio to Belarus; 21 May 2020 – 28 June 2024	Succeeded by Ignazio Ceffalia
Preceded by José Avelino Bettencourt	Apostolic Nuncio to Armenia and Georgia; 28 June 2024 – present	Incumbent
Catholic Church titles
Preceded by Eugene Nugent	Head of Holy See Study Mission, Hong Kong; 2010–2019	Succeeded by Javier Herrera Corona
Preceded by Gonzalo Alonso Calzada Guerrero	— TITULAR — Archbishop of Cissa; 2019–present	Incumbent
