= Juan Antonio Cruz Serrano =

Spanish priest and Holy See diplomat

Monsignor Juan Antonio Cruz Serrano
- Permanent Observer of the Holy See to the Organization of American States
- Appointed: 5 February 2021
- Predecessor: Mark Miles

Orders
- Ordination: 15 September 2001

Personal details
- Born: 29 September 1976 (age 49) María, Spain

Juan Antonio Cruz Serrano (born 29 September 1976) is a Spanish priest of the Catholic Church who works in the diplomatic service of the Holy See.

Cruz Serrano was born in María, Almería, on 29 September 1976. He was ordained a priest of the Diocese of Almería on 15 September 2001. He earned a doctorate in Canon Law in 2002 and then entered the Pontifical Ecclesiastical Academy to prepare for a career as a diplomat.

== Diplomatic career ==
He entered the diplomatic service of the Holy See on 1 July 2004. His early assignments included stints in the papal representations in Zimbabwe, Ireland, and Chile, and then in Rome in the Section for General Affairs of the Secretariat of State. He participated in translating the encyclical Fratelli tutti for its release in October 2020.

On 5 February 2021, Pope Francis appointed him Permanent Observer of the Holy See to the Organization of American States.

He is the author of La reserva penal a la sede apostólica.

== See also ==
- List of heads of the diplomatic missions of the Holy See
