= Permanent Observer of the Holy See to the Organization of American States =

Diplomatic post of the Holy See

The Permanent Observer of the Holy See to the Organization of American States is a diplomatic post of the Holy See. First appointed in 1978, the position had been given to the Vatican's diplomat to the United States until 2012. In 2012, Pope Benedict XVI appointed the Holy See's Permanent Observer to the United Nations in New York to the post. Pope Francis and Secretary of State Pietro Parolin maintained that new pattern in 2014, and then in 2019 appointed the first observer to hold only that position.

== Observers ==
- Jean Jadot (1978 – 27 June 1980)
- Pio Laghi (10 December 1980 – 6 April 1990)
- Agostino Cacciavillan (13 June 1990 – 5 November 1998)
- Gabriel Montalvo Higuera (December 1998 – 17 December 2005)
- Pietro Sambi (17 December 2005 – 27 July 2011)
- Francis Assisi Chullikatt (21 August 2012 (Note: The date of Chullikatt's appointment is unknown. He presented his credentials on 21 August 2012.) – July 2014) (Note: The date Chullikatt's assignment ended is unknown. He did not receive another diplomatic assignment until April 2016.)
- Bernardito Auza (16 July 2014 (Note: Auza's assignment to the OAS followed his appointment as observer to the United Nations on 2 July.) – 31 August 2019)
- Mark Miles (31 August 2019 – 5 February 2021)
- Juan Antonio Cruz Serrano (5 February 2021 – present)
