= Apostolic Nunciature to Uzbekistan =

Diplomatic Mission of the Holy See in Uzbekistan

- Location: Tashkent 100047, Uzbekistan
- Address: 80/1 Taraqqiyot Street, Tashkent 100047, Uzbekistan
- Coordinates: 41°18′19.5″N 69°17′46.9″E
- Apostolic Nuncio: Vacant

The Apostolic Nunciature to Uzbekistan the diplomatic mission of the Holy See to Uzbekistan. It is located in Tashkent. The last Apostolic Nuncio is Archbishop Celestino Migliore, who was named to the position by Pope Francis on 21 January 2017. The title Apostolic Nuncio to Uzbekistan is held by the prelate appointed Apostolic Nuncio to Russia; he resides in Russia.

The Apostolic Nunciature to the Republic of Uzbekistan is an ecclesiastical office of the Catholic Church in Uzbekistan, with the rank of an embassy. The nuncio serves both as the ambassador of the Holy See to the President of Uzbekistan, and as delegate and point-of-contact between the Catholic hierarchy in Uzbekistan and the Pope.

== List of papal representatives to Uzbekistan ==
- Marian Oleś (9 April 1994 – 11 December 2001)
- Józef Wesołowski (6 November 2002 – 24 January 2008)
- Antonio Mennini (26 July 2008 – 18 December 2010)
- Ivan Jurkovič (22 July 2011 – 13 February 2016)
- Celestino Migliore (21 January 2017 – 11 January 2020)
- Giovanni d’Aniello (14 Jan 2021 - present)
