= Gabriele Giordano Caccia =

Italian Catholic prelate (born 1957)

His Excellency, The Most Reverend Gabriele Giordano Caccia STD, JCL
- Apostolic Nuncio to the United States
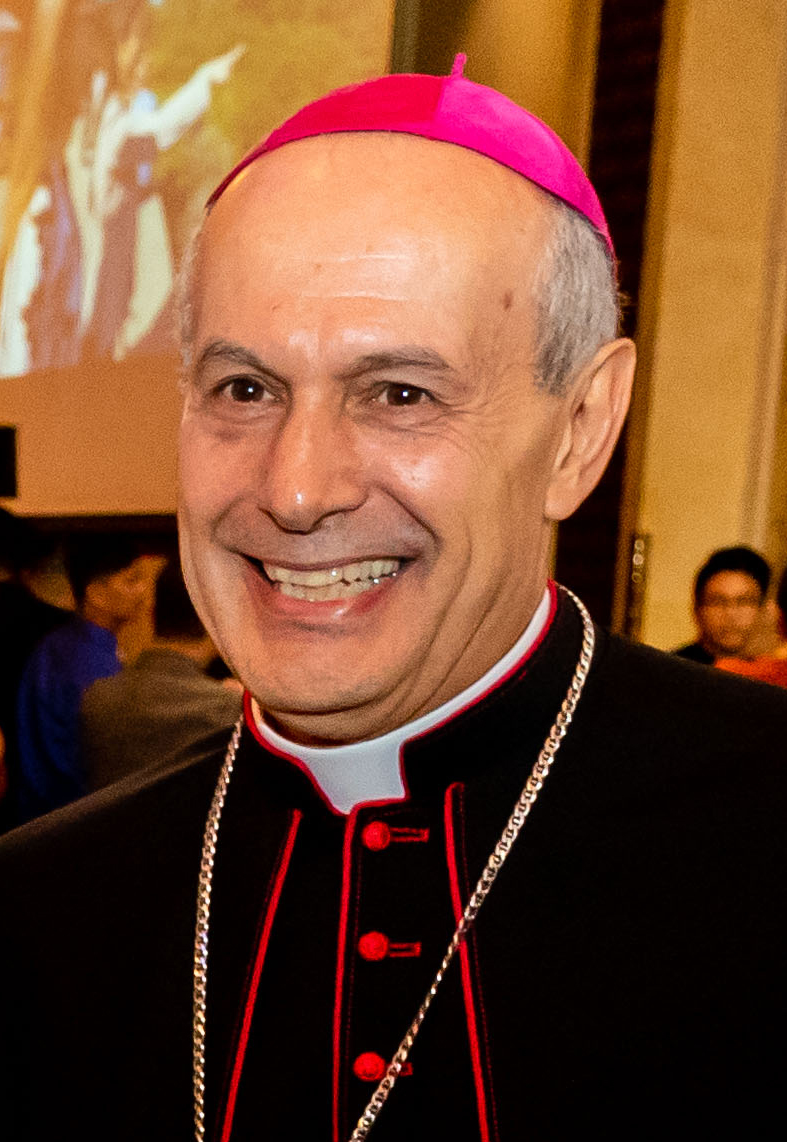
- Caccia in 2018
- Church: Catholic Church
- Appointed: 7 March 2026
- Predecessor: Christophe Pierre
- Other post: Titular Archbishop of Sepino
- Previous post: Permanent Observer of the Holy See to the United Nations (2019–2026); Apostolic Nuncio to the Philippines (2017–2019); Apostolic Nuncio to Lebanon (2009–2017); Assessor for General Affairs (2002–2009)

Orders
- Ordination: 11 June 1983 by Carlo Maria Martini
- Consecration: 12 September 2009 by Pope Benedict XVI

Personal details
- Born: 24 February 1958 (age 68) Milan, Italy
- Education: Pontifical Ecclesiastical Academy; Pontifical Gregorian University
- Motto: Credidimus caritati (Latin for 'We believe in love')
- Styles
- Reference style: The Most Reverend
- Spoken style: Your Excellency
- Religious style: Archbishop

Gabriele Giordano Caccia (born 24 February 1958) is an Italian Catholic prelate who works in the diplomatic service of the Holy See. He was named apostolic nuncio to the United States in March 2026. He previously served in the Secretariat of State, then as apostolic nuncio to Lebanon and the Philippines, and then as the permanent observer of the Holy See to the United Nations from 2020 to 2026.

== Biography ==
Caccia was born in Milan but lived for many years in Cavaria con Premezzo. He was ordained a priest on 11 June 1983 by Cardinal Carlo Maria Martini and served in St. Giovanni Bosco parish in Milan until 1986. He attended the Pontifical Ecclesiastical Academy and obtained a Doctorate in Sacred Theology and a Licentiate of Canon Law from the Pontifical Gregorian University.

== Diplomatic career ==
He joined the diplomatic service of the Holy See on 1 July 1991 and was appointed an attaché in the Apostolic Nunciature in Tanzania.

On 11 June 1993, he returned to Rome to work in the General Affairs Section of the Vatican Secretariat of State. On 17 December 2002 he was appointed assessor for general affairs of the Secretariat of State where he worked under Archbishop Leonardo Sandri and, after 2007, Archbishop Fernando Filoni.

On 16 July 2009, Pope Benedict XVI appointed him apostolic nuncio to Lebanon and titular archbishop of Sepino. He was consecrated by the Pope on 12 September 2009, with Cardinals Tarcisio Bertone and William Levada as co-consecrators. On 12 September 2017, Pope Francis appointed him as apostolic nuncio to the Philippines.

On 16 November 2019, Pope Francis named him the Holy See's permanent observer to the United Nations. He was officially given the duties of that position on 16 January 2020.

On 7 March 2026, Pope Leo XIV appointed Caccia to succeed Cardinal Christophe Pierre as apostolic nuncio to the United States.

== Foreign honours ==
- Philippines:
  - Grand Cross (Datu) of the Order of Sikatuna (GrCS) (11 December 2019)

== See also ==
- List of heads of the diplomatic missions of the Holy See

Catholic Church titles
Preceded by Pedro López Quintana	Assessor for General Affairs of the Secretariat of State; 17 December 2002 – 16 July 2009	Succeeded by Peter Bryan Wells
Diplomatic posts
Preceded by Luigi Gatti	Apostolic Nuncio to Lebanon; 16 July 2009 – 12 September 2017	Succeeded by Joseph Spiteri
Preceded by Giuseppe Pinto	Apostolic Nuncio to the Philippines; 12 September 2017 – 16 November 2019	Succeeded by Charles John Brown
Preceded by Bernardito Auza	Permanent Observer of the Holy See to the United Nations; 16 January 2020 – 7 March 2026	Succeeded by Christophe Zakhia El-Kassis
Preceded by Christophe Pierre	Apostolic Nuncio to the United States; 7 March 2026 – present	Incumbent
