= Ivan Jurkovič =

Slovenian prelate of the Catholic Church (born 1952)

His Excellency, The Most Reverend Ivan Jurkovič
- Apostolic Nuncio to Canada; Titular Archbishop of Krbava
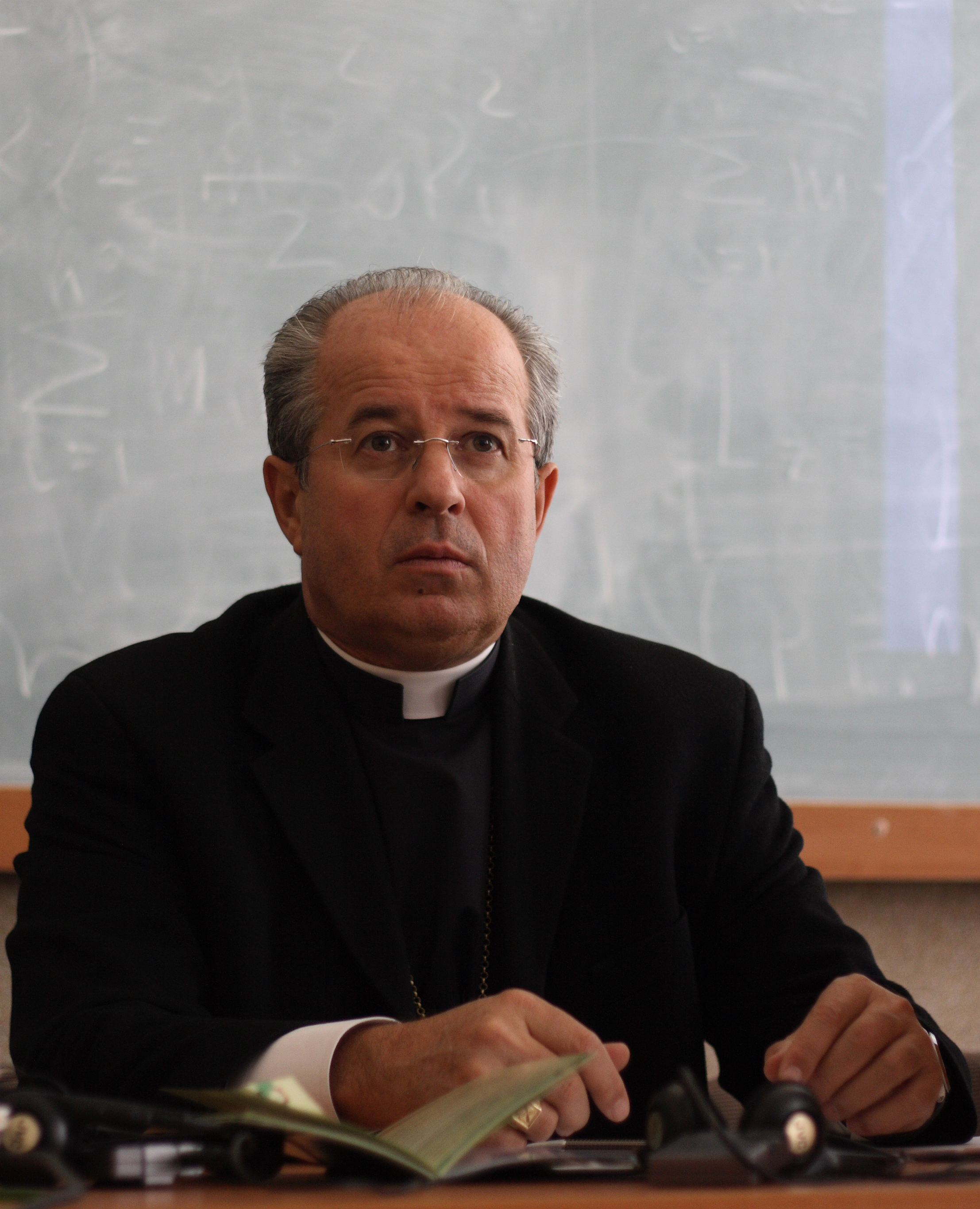
- Church: Roman Catholic Church
- Appointed: 6 June 2021
- Predecessor: Luigi Bonazzi
- Other post: Titular Archbishop of Krbava
- Previous posts: Permanent Observer to the United Nations and Specialized Institutions in Geneva (2016–2021); Apostolic Nuncio to Russia and Uzbekistan (2011-2016); Apostolic Nuncio to Ukraine (2004-2011); Apostolic Nuncio to Belarus (2001-2004)

Orders
- Ordination: 29 July 1977 by Jože Pogacnik
- Consecration: 6 October 2001 by Angelo Sodano

Personal details
- Born: Ivan Jurkovič; 10 June 1952 (age 74) Kočevje, SR Slovenia, SFR Yugoslavia
- Education: University of Ljubljana; Pontifical Ecclesiastical Academy
- Motto: Omnia in caritate ("All things in love")

Styles of Ivan Jurkovič
- Reference style: The Most Reverend
- Spoken style: Your Excellency
- Religious style: Monsignor
- Posthumous style: not applicable

Ivan Jurkovič (born 10 June 1952) is a Slovenian prelate of the Catholic Church who has been the Apostolic Nuncio to Canada since June 2021. He has worked in the diplomatic service of the Holy See since 1984 and previously served as the Nuncio to Belarus, Ukraine, Russia and Uzbekistan.

== Biography ==
Born in Kočevje, southern Slovenia, Ivan Jurkovič was ordained to the priesthood on 29 June 1977. Jurkovič obtained a theology degree from the University of Ljubljana.

== Diplomatic career ==
He was trained as a diplomat in the Pontifical University and entered the diplomatic service of the Holy See in 1984, serving as a secretary in the Pontifical Representations in South Korea. In 1988 he obtained Doctor of Canon Law degree from the Pontifical Lateran University and from 1988 to 1992 served as a financial auditor in the Pontifical Representations in Colombia.

From 1992 to 1996 he was appointed as a consultant to the Apostolic Nunciature in Russia. At the same time, he served as Professor of Canon Law at the St. Thomas Institute of Philosophy, Theology and History in Moscow, where he published the following books: Marriage Law (Moscow, 1993), Canon Law on the People of God (Moscow, 1993), Latin-Russian Dictionary of Terms and Expressions of the Code of Canon Law (with A. Koval, Moscow, 1995), Canon Law on the People of God and Marriage (Second edition, Moscow, 2000). Then he worked as a consultant in the OSCE.

On 28 July 2001, Pope John Paul II appointed him Titular Archbishop of Krbava and Apostolic Nuncio to Belarus. Jurkovič received his episcopal consecration on 6 October in Ljubljana from Cardinal Angelo Sodano, with Cardinal Franc Rode and Archbishop Edmond Y. Farhat serving as co-consecrators.

He was reassigned as Nuncio to Ukraine on 22 April 2004. Jurkovič was named Nuncio to Russia on 19 February 2011, just fourteen months after the establishment of full diplomatic relations between Russia and the Holy See. On 22 July 2011 Jurkovič was named Nuncio to Uzbekistan as well. On 13 February 2016, Pope Francis named him Permanent Observer to the United Nations in Geneva.

On 5 June 2021, Pope Francis appointed him Apostolic Nuncio to Canada.

Jurkovič is a Conventual Chaplain Grand Cross ad honorem of the Sovereign Military Order of Hospitalers of Saint John of Jerusalem, Rhodes and Malta.

== See also ==
- List of heads of the diplomatic missions of the Holy See

Diplomatic posts
Preceded by Dominik Hrušovský	Nuncio to Belarus; 2001–2004	Succeeded by Martin Vidović
Preceded by Nikola Eterović	Nuncio to Ukraine; 2004–2011	Succeeded by Thomas Gullickson
Preceded by Antonio Mennini	Nuncio to Uzbekistan; 2011–2016	Succeeded by Celestino Migliore
Preceded by Luigi Bonazzi	Nuncio to Canada; 2021–present	Incumbent
Preceded by Antonio Mennini	Nuncio to Russia; 2011–2016	Succeeded by Celestino Migliore
Preceded by Silvano Maria Tomasi	Permanent Observer of the Holy See to the United Nations in Geneva; 2016–2021	Succeeded by Fortunatus Nwachukwu
