= Mauricio Rueda Beltz =

His Excellency, The Most Reverend Mauricio Rueda Beltz
- Apostolic Nuncio to Cote d’Ivoire; Titular Archbishop of Cingoli
- Appointed: 16 June 2023
- Predecessor: Paolo Borgia
- Other post: Titular Archbishop of Cingoli

Orders
- Ordination: 19 December 1996 by Pedro Rubiano Sáenz
- Consecration: 9 September 2023 by Pietro Parolin, Baselios Cleemis and Rubén Salazar Gómez

Personal details
- Born: 8 January 1970 (age 56) Bogotá, Colombia
- Coat of arms

Styles of Mauricio Rueda Beltz
- Reference style: His Excellency; The Most Reverend
- Spoken style: Your Excellency
- Religious style: Archbishop

Mauricio Rueda Beltz (born 8 January 1970) is a Colombian prelate of the Catholic Church who works in the diplomatic service of the Holy See.

== Biography ==
Mauricio Rueda Beltz was born on 8 January 1970 in Bogotá, Colombia. He was ordained a priest for the Roman Catholic Archdiocese of Bogotá on 19 December 1996. He graduated in canon law and knows French, English, Italian and Portuguese.

== Diplomatic career ==
He entered the Holy See Diplomatic Service on 1 July 2004 and subsequently served in the Pontifical Representations in Guinea, Chile, the United States of America and Jordan. He transferred to the Section for Relations with States and International Organizations of the Secretariat of State, as head of the organization of Apostolic Journeys. He was then transferred to the apostolic nunciature in Portugal. He was appointed under-secretary of the Section for Holy See Diplomatic Staff on 17 December 2020.

On 16 June 2023, Pope Francis appointed him Titular Archbishop of Cingoli and Apostolic Nuncio to Côte d'Ivoire. He was consecrated as archbishop on 9 September 2023.

== See also ==
- List of heads of the diplomatic missions of the Holy See
