= Apostolic Nunciature to Côte d'Ivoire =

Diplomatic post of the Holy See

The Apostolic Nunciature to Côte d'Ivoire is an ecclesiastical office of the Catholic Church in Côte d'Ivoire. It is a diplomatic post of the Holy See, whose representative is called the Apostolic Nuncio with the rank of an ambassador.

== Representatives of the Holy See to Côte d'Ivoire ==
Apostolic Pro-Nuncios

- Giovanni Mariani (19 June 1972 - 11 January 1975)
- Bruno Wüstenberg (19 December 1973 - 17 January 1979)

Apostolic Nuncios

- Justo Mullor García (22 March 1979 - 3 May 1985)
- Antonio Mattiazzo (16 November 1985 - 5 July 1989)
- Janusz Bolonek (25 September 1989 - 23 January 1995)
- Luigi Ventura (25 March 1995 - 25 March 1999)
- Mario Zenari (12 July 1999 - 10 May 2004)
- Mario Roberto Cassari (31 July 2004 - 14 February 2008)
- Ambrose Madtha (8 May 2008 – 8 December 2012)
- Joseph Spiteri (1 October 2013 - 7 March 2018)
  - Ante Jozić was appointed on 2 February 2019, but injuries sustained in a car accident delayed his episcopal consecration and he did not take up the post. (Note: Pope Francis named Ante Jozić Apostolic Nuncio to the Ivory Coast on 2 February 2019. His consecration as bishop, scheduled for 1 May, was postponed after Jozić was seriously injured in a car accident in Croatia on 7 April.)
- Paolo Borgia (28 October 2019 – 24 September 2022)
- Mauricio Rueda Beltz (16 June 2023 – present)

== See also ==
- Holy See–Ivory Coast relations
- Foreign relations of the Holy See
- List of diplomatic missions of the Holy See
