= Celestino Migliore =

Italian Archbishop

His Excellency, The Most Reverend Celestino Migliore
- Apostolic Nuncio to France; Titular Archbishop of Canosa
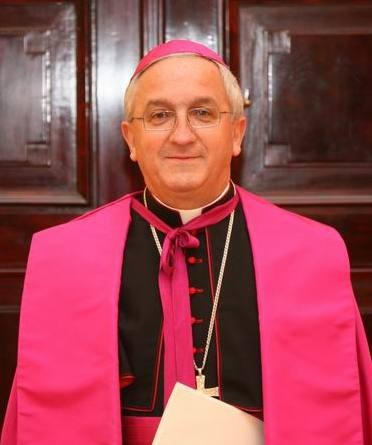
- Archbishop Celestino Migliore
- Appointed: 11 January 2020
- Predecessor: Luigi Ventura
- Other post: Titular Archbishop of Canosa
- Previous posts: Apostolic Nuncio to Uzbekistan (2017-2020); Apostolic Nuncio to Russia (2016-2020); Apostolic Nuncio to Poland (2010-2016); Permanent Observer of the Holy See to the United Nations (2002-2010); Undersecretary for Relations with States (1995-2002); Permanent Observer of the Holy See to the Council of Europe (1992-1995)

Orders
- Ordination: 25 June 1977 by Carlo Aliprandi
- Consecration: 6 January 2003 by Pope John Paul II, Leonardo Sandri and Antonio Maria Vegliò

Personal details
- Born: 1 July 1952 (age 74) Cuneo, Italy
- Education: Pontifical Ecclesiastical Academy; Pontifical Lateran University
- Motto: Confitebor Tibi In Populis

Styles of Celestino Migliore
- Reference style: His Excellency; The Most Reverend
- Spoken style: Your Excellency
- Religious style: Archbishop

Celestino Migliore (born 1 July 1952) is an Italian Archbishop of the Catholic Church who serves as the Apostolic Nuncio to France. He previously served as Permanent Observer of the Holy See to the United Nations. He has spent most of his career in the diplomatic service of the Holy See.

== Early years ==
Celestino Migliore was born on 1 July 1952 in Cuneo, Italy. He was ordained a priest on 25 June 1977.

He has a master's degree in theology from the Center of Theological Studies in Fossano, Italy, and a doctorate in canon law from the Pontifical Lateran University in Rome. To prepare for a diplomatic career he entered the Pontifical Ecclesiastical Academy in 1977.

== Diplomatic career ==
Joining the Holy See's diplomatic service, Migliore served as attaché and second secretary to the Apostolic Delegation in Angola from 1980 to 1984. In 1984, he was assigned to the Apostolic Nunciature in the United States, then in 1988, he was assigned to the Apostolic Nunciature in Egypt, and in 1989 he was at the Apostolic Nunciature in Warsaw, Poland. In 1992, he was appointed as Special Envoy to the Council of Europe in Strasbourg, France, until 1995, when he became the Under-Secretary of the Section for Relations with States of the Vatican's Secretariat of State. During his term as Under-Secretary, he was also in charge of fostering relations with countries that did not yet have formal relations with the Holy See, and in that capacity, he led delegations to China, Vietnam, North Korea, and numerous United Nations conferences. He also taught ecclesiastical diplomacy at the Pontifical Lateran University, as a visiting professor.

=== Permanent Observer to the United Nations ===
On 30 October 2002, Pope John Paul II nominated him to the position of Permanent Observer to the United Nations. He was the fourth person to serve in the role. At the same time, he was also appointed Titular Archbishop of Canosa. He received his episcopal consecration on 6 January 2003.

In 2007, he noted that all "Member States affirmed the collective international responsibility to protect populations from genocide, war crimes, ethnic cleansing and crimes against humanity, and their willingness to take timely and decisive collective action for this purpose, through the Security Council, when peaceful means prove inadequate and national authorities are manifestly failing to do it. My delegation believes there is need to pursue the debate and juridical codification along this very line, wherein sovereignty is not understood as an absolute right and used as a shield against outside involvement, but as a responsibility not merely to protect citizens, but also to promote their welfare. Through the creation of legal norms, arbitration of legal disputes and the establishment of safeguards, especially when States fail in their responsibility to protect, the United Nations is called to be the propulsive forum for the rule of law in all corners of the globe".

During Migliore's tenure, on 18 April 2008, Pope Benedict XVI made a pastoral visit to the United Nations Headquarters and met with Secretary-General Ban Ki-moon and addressed the General Assembly and staff.

In September 2008, he said:

Despite the growing consensus behind the responsibility to protect as a means for greater cooperation, this principle is still being invoked as a pretext for the arbitrary use of military might. This distortion is a continuation of past failed methods and ideas. The use of violence to resolve disagreements is always a failure of vision and a failure of humanity. The responsibility to protect should not be viewed merely in terms of military intervention.

In November 2008, Migliore led the delegation of the Holy See to the Follow-up International Conference on Financing for Development to Review the Implementation of the Monterrey Consensus in Doha, Qatar, during which he stressed the importance of right action and the human person, stating that "Global development is, at its heart, a question not only of technical logistics but more fundamentally of morality" and that "Social and economic development must be measured and implemented with the human person at the center of all decisions."

In response to a proposed nonbinding UN declaration on LGBT rights introduced at the United Nations by member States of the European Union, Migliore said that unjust forms of discrimination against homosexuals must be avoided, but he also said that adding such "new categories [that would be] protected from discrimination" would create in turn "new and implacable discriminations". He continued by saying that "Countries that don't recognize the union between people of the same sex as marriage will be punished and pressured." The proposed declaration does not in fact mention same-sex marriage, but most of the nations that support the document do recognize same-sex unions.

Speaking on the 2008–2009 Israel–Gaza conflict, Migliore said that the Holy See "would like to express its solidarity with the civilians in those regions who bear the brunt of a cruel conflict"; "that Security Council resolution 1860, of January 8, which calls for an immediate and enduring ceasefire as well as for an unimpeded humanitarian assistance, be implemented fully"; and "that so many failed efforts are due to insufficiently courageous and coherent political will for establishing peace, from every side, and ultimately an unwillingness to come together and forge a just and lasting peace."

On 6 May 2009, Migliore called for "concrete, transparent and convincing steps" towards nuclear disarmament and non-proliferation. Speaking to the third session of the Preparatory Committee for the 2010 U.N. Conference on the Non-Proliferation of Nuclear Weapons, he said the Treaty on the Non-Proliferation of Weapons (NPT) remains a "cornerstone" of nuclear disarmament, after four decades. "The Holy See reaffirms its strong and continuing support for the NPT and calls for universal and full adherence to and compliance with the Treaty", he said. The first measure he suggested was starting negotiations for a Fissile Material Cut-Off Treaty, which he said are "overdue". Migliore also advocated that the peaceful use of nuclear energy should be under "strict control" of the International Atomic Energy Agency.

=== Apostolic Nuncio ===
Pope Benedict XVI appointed him Apostolic Nuncio to Poland on 30 June 2010.

On 28 May 2016, Pope Francis named him nuncio to Russia, and on 21 January 2017 named him nuncio to Uzbekistan as well.

On 11 January 2020, Pope Francis named him nuncio to France.

== See also ==
- List of heads of the diplomatic missions of the Holy See

Catholic Church titles
Preceded by Claudio Maria Celli	Undersecretary for Relations with States; 16 December 1995 – 30 October 2002	Succeeded by Pietro Parolin
Diplomatic posts
Preceded by Renato Raffaele Martino	Permanent Observer of the Holy See to the United Nations; 30 October 2002 – 30 June 2010	Succeeded by Francis Chullikatt
Preceded by Józef Kowalczyk	Apostolic Nuncio to Poland; 30 June 2010 – 28 May 2016	Succeeded by Salvatore Pennacchio
Preceded by Ivan Jurkovič	Apostolic Nuncio to Russia; 28 May 2016 – 11 January 2020	Succeeded by Giovanni d'Aniello
Preceded by Luigi Ventura	Apostolic Nuncio to France; 11 January 2020 –	Succeeded by incumbent
