= Apostolic Nunciature to Belarus =

Diplomatic post of the Holy See

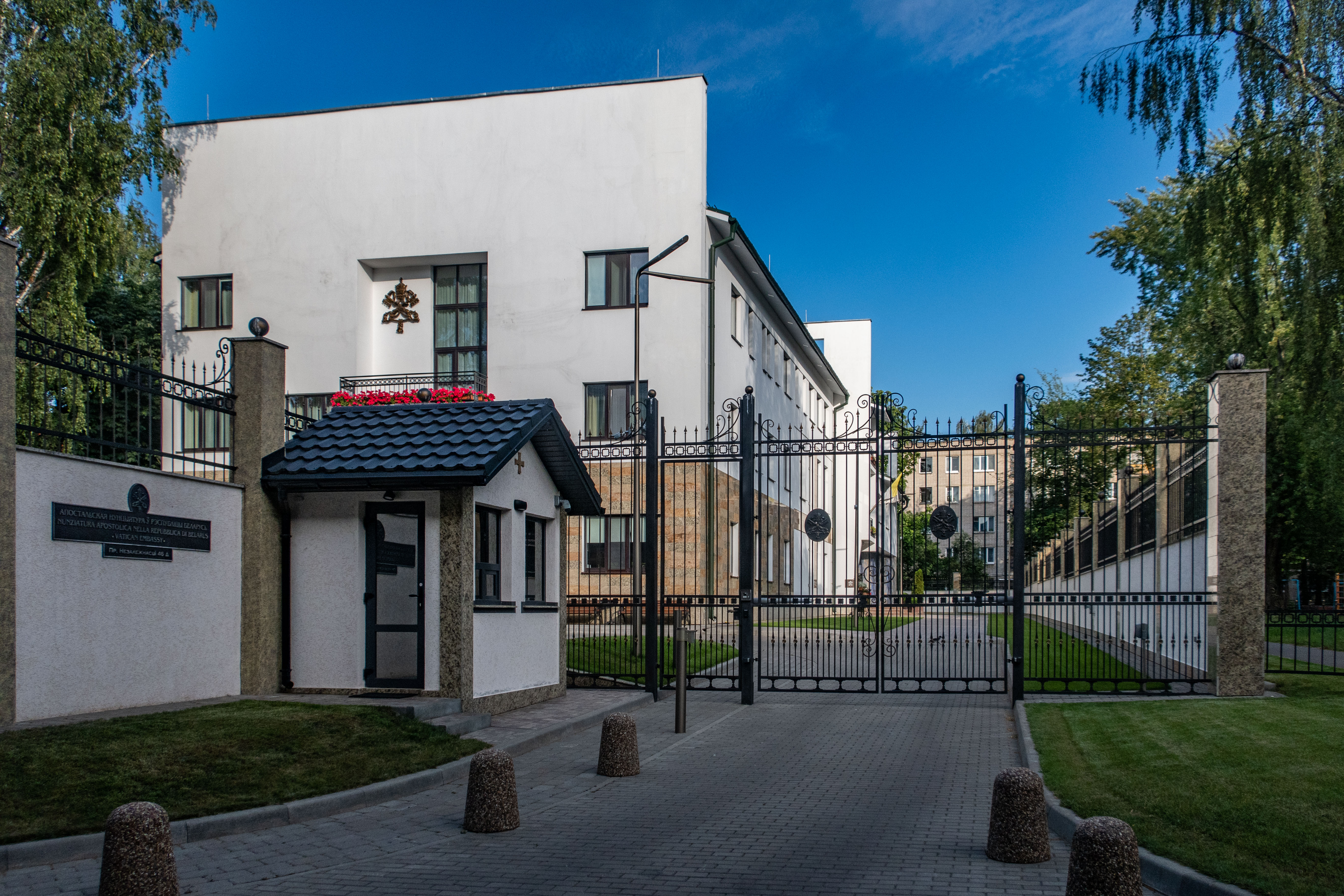
- Location: Minsk
- Apostolic Nuncio: Archbishop Ante Jozić

The Apostolic Nunciature to Belarus is an ecclesiastical office of the Catholic Church in Belarus. It is a diplomatic post of the Holy See, whose representative is called the Apostolic Nuncio with the rank of an ambassador.

== Representatives of the Holy See to Belarus ==
Apostolic nuncios

- Gabriel Montalvo Higuera (17 April 1993 – unknown) (Note: Named president of the Pontifical Ecclesiastical Academy on 29 April 1993.)
- Agostino Marchetto (18 May 1994 – 13 April 1996)
- Dominik Hrušovský (13 April 1996 – 28 July 2001)
- Ivan Jurkovič (28 July 2001 – 22 April 2004)
- Martin Vidović (15 September 2004 – 2011)
- Claudio Gugerotti (15 July 2011 – 13 November 2015)
- Gábor Pintér (13 May 2016 – 12 November 2019)
- Ante Jozić (21 May 2020 – 28 June 2024)
- Ignazio Ceffalia (25 March 2025 – present)

== See also ==
- Foreign relations of the Holy See
- List of diplomatic missions of the Holy See
