= Holy See–Ivory Coast relations =

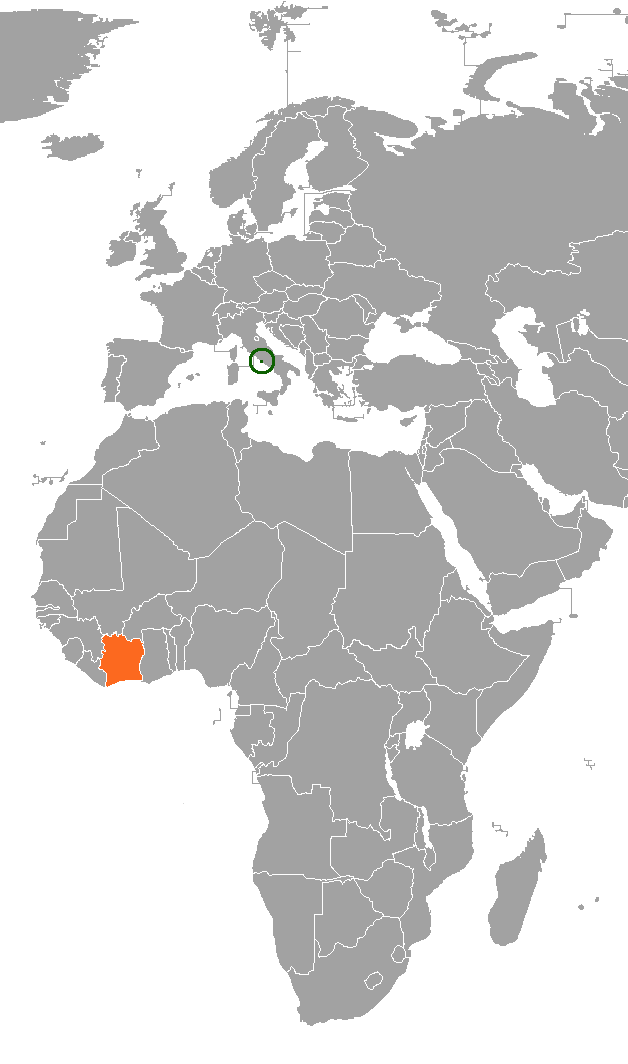
- Holy See: Ivory Coast

Holy See–Ivory Coast relations refers to the current relationship between the Holy See and the Republic of Côte d'Ivoire, which was established in 1970. A significant number of Roman Catholics live in Ivory Coast, being nearly one-fifth of the population, and the two states are considered to have a cordial relationship.

Ivory Coast maintains an embassy in Rome near Vatican City, while the Holy See has an apostolic nunciature in Abidjan. The current ambassador of Ivory Coast to the Vatican is Séverin Mathias Akeo. Archbishop Joseph Spiteri's tenure as apostolic nuncio to the Ivory Coast ended on 7 March 2018. Pope Francis named Ante Jozić to replace him on 2 February 2019, but Jozić was seriously injured in a car accident in Croatia on 7 April and his consecration as bishop has been delayed.

== History ==
The two states first established diplomatic relations in October 1970.

== High level visits ==
President Alassane Ouattara visited the Vatican in November 2012 and spoke with Pope Benedict XVI. The two of them discussed relations between their two countries, as well as the role of the Catholic Church in Ivory Coast and the progress that country has been making in recent years since the 2010–11 Ivorian crisis. They also discussed the possibility of signing a bilateral framework agreement, similar to the ones that the Holy See signed with other African countries, which would specify the legal status of the Church in Ivory Coast.

== See also ==
- Roman Catholicism in Ivory Coast
- Foreign relations of the Holy See
- Foreign relations of Ivory Coast
- Religion in Ivory Coast
