= Apostolic Nunciature to Ukraine =

Diplomatic Mission of the Holy See in Ukraine

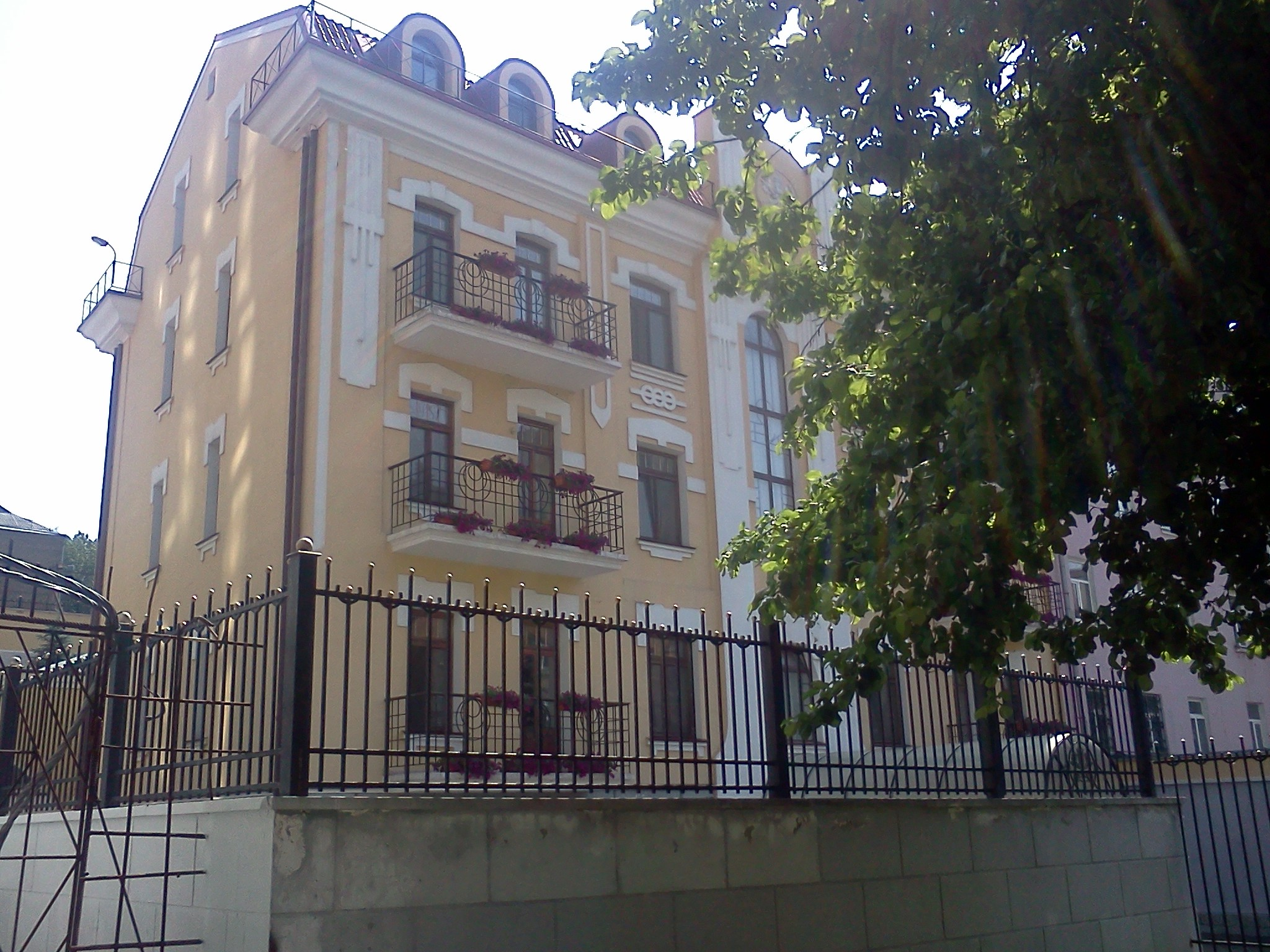
- Location: Kyiv
- Address: Turhenivska Street 40, 01901, Kyiv, Ukraine
- Coordinates: 50.4518°N 30.4927°E
- Apostolic Nuncio: Visvaldas Kulbokas
- Website: https://nunciaturekyiv.org/

The Apostolic Nunciature to Ukraine is the diplomatic mission of the Holy See to Ukraine. It is located in Kyiv. Visvaldas Kulbokas, an archbishop, was named Apostolic Nuncio by Pope Francis on 15 June 2021.

It is an ecclesiastical office of the Catholic Church in Ukraine, with the rank of an embassy. The nuncio serves both as the ambassador of the Holy See to the President of Ukraine, and as delegate and point-of-contact between the Catholic hierarchy in Ukraine and the Pope.

== History ==
Contacts between the Holy See and the rulers of Ukraine were intermittent and of little consequence before the modern era. The Western Ukrainian People's Republic, created in November 1918, had diplomatic relations with the Holy See before it was annexed to Poland after eight months. Pope Benedict XV received its ambassador, Count Mykhailo Tyshkevych, in May 1919 and the pope in turn named Fr. Giovanni Genocchi his apostolic visitator in Ukraine on 23 February 1920. Genocci returned to Rome in December 1921 once the Bolshevik offensive made his continued presence in Ukraine untenable.

The Holy See and Ukraine established diplomatic relations on 8 February 1992, and Pope John Paul II issued the brief «Ucrainam Nationem» that founded the Apostolic Nunciature to Ukraine that same day.

During the Russian invasion of Ukraine, the nunciature was damaged following a Russian air attack on 10 July 2025.

== Apostolic Nuncios ==
- Antonio Franco (28 March 1992 – 6 April 1999)
- Nikola Eterović (22 May 1999 – 11 February 2004)
- Ivan Jurkovič (22 April 2004 – 19 February 2011)
- Thomas Gullickson (21 May 2011 – 5 September 2015)
- Claudio Gugerotti (13 November 2015 – 4 July 2020)
- Visvaldas Kulbokas (15 June 2021 – present)

== See also ==
- Roman Catholic Archdiocese of Lviv
- Holy See–Ukraine relations
- List of diplomatic missions of the Holy See
- Foreign relations of Ukraine
- Diplomatic missions in Ukraine
- Diplomatic missions of the Holy See
