= Apostolic Nunciature to Lebanon =

Diplomatic post of the Holy See

The Apostolic Nuncio to Lebanon is a diplomatic post within the Catholic Church for the Lebanese peoples.

Pope Pius XII established the Apostolic Nunciature in Lebanon on 21 March 1947 via the Pontifical decree Ad Christifidelium Salutem.

== List of Apostolic Nuncios ==
- Giuseppe Beltrami (4 October 1950 – 31 January 1959)
- Paolo Bertoli (16 April 1959 – 16 April 1960)
- Egano Righi-Lambertini (9 July 1960 – 9 December 1963)
- Gaetano Alibrandi (9 December 1963 – 19 April 1969)
- Alfredo Bruniera (23 April 1969 – 6 November 1978)
- Carlo Furno (25 November 1978 – 21 August 1982)
- Luciano Angeloni (21 August 1982 – 31 July 1989)
- Pablo Puente Buces (31 July 1989 – 31 July 1997)
- Antonio Maria Vegliò (2 October 1997 – 11 April 2001)
- Luigi Gatti (28 June 2001 – 16 July 2009)
- Gabriele Giordano Caccia (16 July 2009 – 12 September 2017)
- Joseph Spiteri (7 March 2018 – 7 July 2022)
- Paolo Borgia (24 September 2022 – present)
