= Apostolic Nunciature to Georgia =

Diplomatic post of the Holy See

The Apostolic Nunciature to Georgia is an ecclesiastical office of the Catholic Church in Georgia. It is a diplomatic post of the Holy See, whose representative is called the Apostolic Nuncio with the rank of an ambassador. The Apostolic Nuncio to Georgia is usually also the Apostolic Nuncio to Armenia upon his appointment to said nation.

== Representatives of the Holy See to Georgia ==
Apostolic nuncios

- Jean-Paul Gobel (7 December 1993 - 6 December 1997)
- Peter Stephan Zurbriggen (13 June 1998 - 25 October 2001)
- Claudio Gugerotti (7 December 2001 - 15 July 2011)
- Marek Solczyński (26 November 2011 - 25 April 2017)
- José Avelino Bettencourt (8 March 2018 - 30 August 2023)
- Ante Jozić (28 June 2024 – present)

== See also ==
- Foreign relations of the Holy See
- List of diplomatic missions of the Holy See
