= Antonio Mennini =

Italian Catholic prelate (born 1947)

The Most Reverend Antonio Mennini
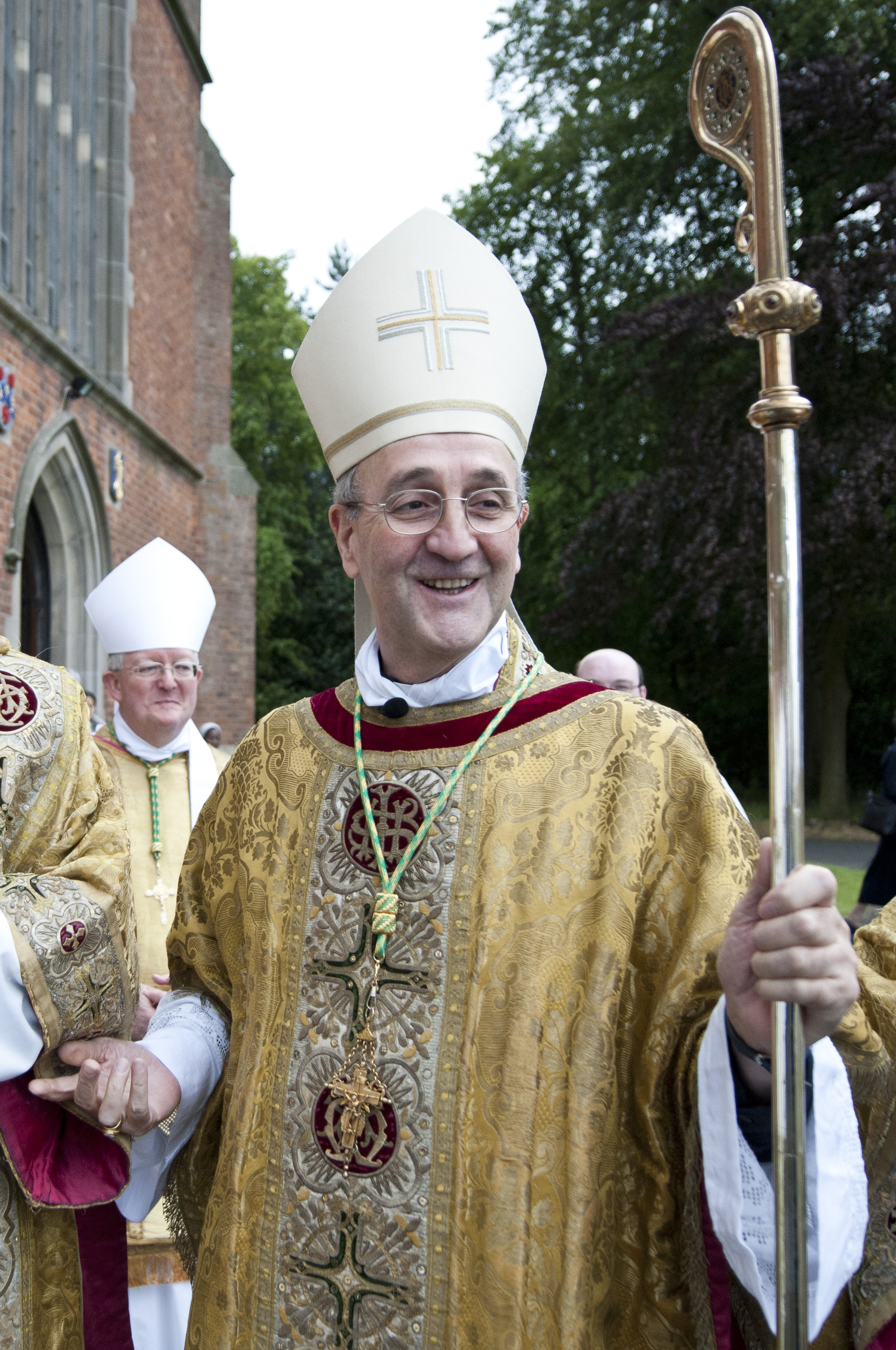
- Antonio Mennini 2011
- Church: Catholic Church
- Other posts: Titular Archbishop of Ferentium (2000–present); Apostolic Nuncio to Great Britain (2010–2017); Apostolic Nuncio to Uzbekistan (2008–2010); Apostolic Nuncio to Russian Federation (2002–2008); Apostolic Nuncio to Bulgaria (2000–2002)

Orders
- Ordination: 14 December 1974 by Ugo Poletti
- Consecration: 12 September 2000 by Angelo Sodano

Personal details
- Born: Antonio Mennini; 2 September 1947 (age 79) Rome, Italy
- Denomination: Catholic Church
- Coat of arms: Antonio Mennini's coat of arms

Ordination history of Antonio Mennini
History
Priestly ordination
- Ordained by: Ugo Poletti (Card. Vic.)
- Date: 14 December 1974
Episcopal consecration
- Principal consecrator: Angelo Sodano (Card. Sec. of State
- Co-consecrators: Camillo Ruini (Card. Vicar); Jean-Louis Tauran (Sec. for Relations w. States)
- Date: 12 September 2000

Styles of Antonio Mennini
- Reference style: The Most Reverend
- Spoken style: Your Excellency

Antonio Mennini (born 2 September 1947) is an Italian prelate of the Catholic Church. Having been appointed by Pope Benedict XVI, he served as the Nuncio to Great Britain from 18 December 2010 until 6 February 2017 when Pope Francis transferred him to work in the Secretariat of State in Rome where he is responsible for relations between the Holy See and Italy.

Besides his native Italian, Mennini speaks English, French, Spanish, German, Bulgarian and Russian.

== Early life and ordination ==
Mennini was born in Rome, in a family that has strong links with the Holy See. His father, Luigi Mennini, who died in 1997, was managing director of the Holy See's Institute for Works of Religion (the Vatican Bank). At the time, allegations of money laundering were made against Archbishop Paul Marcinkus, the Institute's sometime president. He has 13 siblings, among them Pietro Mennini, who is the Procuratore della Repubblica di Chieti ("Public Prosecutor of Chieti"). Mennini was ordained to the priesthood on 14 December 1974. Mennini obtained a Doctor of Theology degree from the Pontifical Gregorian University of Rome.

== Aldo Moro case ==
Mennini is known in Italy as the priest who heard the final confession of the country’s murdered Prime Minister, Aldo Moro, in the 1970s. Moro had been kidnapped and was being held captive in a secret location by the Red Brigades, a leftist Italian militant group. Archbishop Mennini, then an assistant priest, is believed to have delivered a letter to the terrorists from Pope Paul VI and a letter to Mr Moro from his wife. Shortly after his secret mission, the Prime Minister was killed and his body dumped in central Rome. The Vatican shielded the priest from ever having to testify in subsequent state hearings concerning Moro’s abduction and murder, until Pope Francis authorized him to do so in 2015.

== Diplomatic career ==
After completing his theology doctorate, and brief service in a Rome parish, Mennini entered the diplomatic service of the Holy See in 1981, serving first as an attache in the Pontifical Representations in Uganda and Turkey, before returning to occupy a post at base on the staff of the Roman Curia's Council for the Public Affairs of the Church.

=== Nuncio to Bulgaria ===
On 8 July 2000, Mennini was appointed Titular Archbishop of Ferentium by Pope John Paul II and Nuncio to Bulgaria. Mennini received episcopal consecration on 12 September from Cardinal Angelo Sodano, assisted by Cardinals Camillo Ruini and Jean-Louis Tauran as co-consecrators.

Upon arrival in Bulgaria, Mennini began preparing Pope John Paul II’s 2002 pastoral visit to Bulgaria amid great controversy. However, the visit was hailed as a success, largely because the new nuncio established excellent working relations with Orthodox leaders who had originally opposed it.

=== Nuncio to Russia and Uzbekistan ===
On 6 November 2002, Mennini was appointed Nuncio to Russia and from 26 July 2008 was also Nuncio to Uzbekistan. He is credited with notably improving the Holy See’s relations with the former Soviet republics and with the Russian Orthodox Church.

As recently as 2001 Rome had been criticised by the Russian Orthodox for setting up Latin Catholic dioceses in Russia without adequate consultation. However, through the nuncio’s fence-mending efforts, the atmosphere gradually began to improve and in December 2009 President Dmitry Medvedev approved the establishment of full diplomatic relations with the Holy See. On 13 February 2011 Dmitry Medvedev awarded Mennini the Order of Friendship for his contribution to the development of Russian-Vatican relations.

=== Nuncio to Great Britain ===
Mennini was named Nuncio to Great Britain on 18 December 2010 following the early retirement of Archbishop Faustino Sainz Muñoz on 2 December 2010. He presented his credentials to Queen Elizabeth II on 2 March 2011.

As a Nuncio, one of the most important duties which Mennini faced was to facilitate the vetting process for the appointment of a substantial number of new bishops for dioceses in England, Wales and Scotland, referring back the results of confidential consultations to the Holy See.

On 25 February 2013, Pope Benedict XVI accepted the resignation of Cardinal Keith O'Brien, Archbishop of St Andrews and Edinburgh and Britain's then most senior cleric. Two days later, the Pope likewise accepted that of Patrick Altham Kelly, Archbishop of Liverpool. Mennini played a role in the appointment of their successors.

A writer in the English Catholic publication The Tablet speculated that Mennini's appointment was recognition that delicate diplomatic work was required for the establishment in Britain of the personal ordinariate for former Anglicans.

=== Secretariat of State ===
On 20 January 2017 it was announced that Mennini was to be transferred to the Roman Curia to serve in the Secretariat of State. His tenure in Britain ended on 6 February. In his new post he is responsible for monitoring relations between the Holy See and Italy.

Catholic Church titles
Preceded by Remigio Ragonesi	Titular archbishop of Ferentium; 2000–present	Incumbent
Diplomatic posts
Preceded by Blasco Francisco Collaço	Nuncio to Bulgaria; 2000–2002	Succeeded by Giuseppe Leanza
Preceded by Giorgio Zur	Nuncio to Russia; 2002–2010	Succeeded by Ivan Jurkovič
Preceded by Józef Wesołowski	Nuncio to Uzbekistan; 2008–2010	Succeeded by Ivan Jurkovič
Preceded by Faustino Sainz Muñoz	Nuncio to Great Britain; 18 December 2010–20 January 2017	Succeeded by Edward Joseph Adams
