= Sant'Ambrogio della Massima =

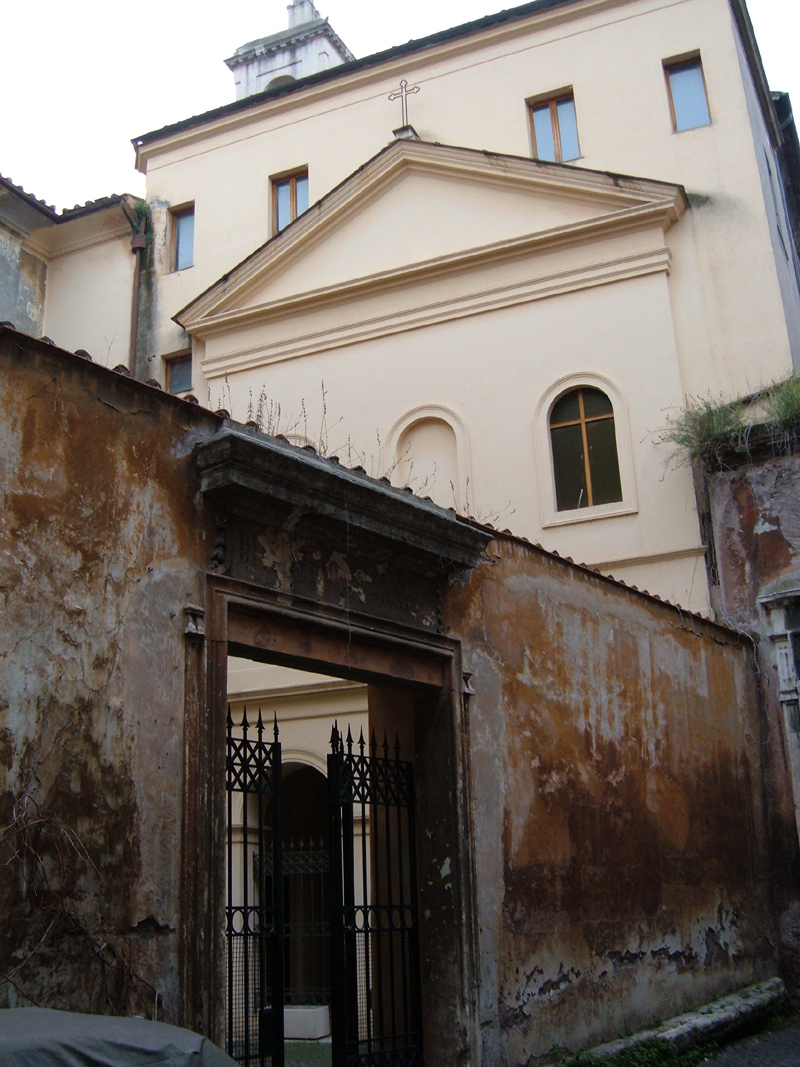
- The church, located in rione Sant'Angelo
- Click on the map for a fullscreen view.
- 41°53′35.4″N 12°28′42″E
- Location: Via di Sant'Ambrogio, Rome
- Country: Italy
- Denomination: Roman Catholic
- Tradition: Latin Church
- Religious order: Benedictines

History
- Status: General Curia of the Subiaco Cassinese Congregation of the Order of Saint Benedict
- Dedication: Ambrose

Architecture
- Architectural type: Church
- Groundbreaking: 4th century

Sant'Ambrogio della Massima (also Sant'Ambrogio alla Massima) is an ancient Catholic church in rione Sant'Angelo, Rome, Italy. It is home to the General Curia of the Subiaco Cassinese Congregation of the Order of Saint Benedict.

Perhaps dating to the 4th century it is said to have been the house of Saint Ambrose’s sister, Saint Marcellina who first established a monastery on the site. This monastery was home to a great many different communities of women through the centuries until a canonical investigation in the 19th century, when it was disbanded and repurposed as a missionary college later becoming the church of the General Curia of the Cassinese Benedictines.

== Etymology ==
The name of the church derives from the tradition that the church was built on the site of the house in which Saint Ambrose lived in Rome, before he moved to become the consul in Milan. The family home was built on the ruins of a temple to Hercules. Archeological research has discovered parts of the temple and porch beneath the current Sant’Ambrogio buildings.

The name "Massima" may derive from the Cloaca Maxima, a branch of which flows nearby, or from the Porticus Maximae, the long arcaded road passed in the immediate vicinity of the church. The Porticus Maxima was part of a larger passageway for pilgrims to reach the tomb of Saint Peter at the Vatican,

== History ==
According to legend, the church of Saint Mary was founded by Saint Marcellina, the older sister of Saint Ambrose, in 353. The house was also the seat of her religious community, but later became the property of a certain Maxima who, under the pontificate of Pope Leo III, had a Latin cross church with a monastery built there. It was called variously "Santo Stefano de Maxima" or "Santa Maria in Formosa".

Around 1500, the church was renovated and turned over to the Benedictines, who re-dedicated it to St. Ambrose. Giacomo della Porta added a new wing in 1578. In 1606, Beatrice de Torres, sister of the abbess, Olympia de Torres, and her brother Cardinal Ludovico de Torres commissioned Carlo Maderno to redesign the church. It was rebuilt by Orazio Torriani incorporating the remains of the previous building. The church was abandoned during the Napoleonic Wars, but was restored under Pope Pius VII beginning in 1814.

During this period the convent was inhabited by Franciscans nuns. The founding abbess of the restored convent, Maria Agnese Firrao, was convicted in 1816 of "false sanctity", or pretending to be a saint, and was removed from her post and imprisoned. Despite this, she continued to direct activities at the convent via smuggled correspondence with followers there. In 1859, Princess Katharina of Hohenlohe-Waldenburg-Schillingsfürst, who had recently joined the convent as a novice, denounced its activities to the Holy Office, accusing the mistress of novices Maria Luisa, among others, of "sexual transgressions, heretical practices and homicidal schemes". Katharina noted the veneration of Firrao as well as Maria Luisa herself; the latter claimed to receive messages from Mary, and slept with several of the novices. Other transgressions included alleged affairs between the women and priests. According to Katharina, when she challenged convent practices, she became the victim of an attempted poisoning. As the investigation proceeded the Holy See removed the sisters from the convent and sent Maria Luisa into "forced isolation".

It emerged that the Jesuit priest who as the "spiritual father" of the nuns had been accustomed to administer the sacrament of Penance had entered into sexual relations with Maria Luisa. Styling himself Giuseppe Peters, his real name was Joseph Kleutgen, an influential German theologian. He was convicted as a heretic for his fostering of the cult of Agnese Firrao and sentenced to three years of imprisonment. Pope Pius IX reduced the sentence to two years. Later Kleutgen was instrumental in the drafting of the dogma of papal infallibility. The details of the affair became known when discovered by researchers in 1976.

In 1861 Pope Pius IX gave the building to a group of Benedictine monks; they adopted it for a missionary college and replaced its façade when it collapsed the following year. Side altars were also added to the church. After 1870, the church and the monastery were expropriated by the Italian State, but later the church and part of the convent were returned to the Benedictines. Initially, the monastery was used as a missionary college to train monks for overseas work. The church is currently an abbey and the curial house of the Subiaco Cassinese Congregation.

== Architecture ==
The current building, parts of which date to the 17th century, is a domed basilica. It is cross-shaped, with a chapel to either side of the nave. The church includes "rich gold stucco decorations and frescos depicting the life of Mary". What is now the main refectory at Sant’Ambrogio was at one point the sisters’ chapter house.

== Relics ==
In the church deposited are the relics of St Polycarp, the bishop of Smyrna.

== Cardinal-Protectors ==
- Claudio Gugerotti, (30 September 2023 - present)
