= Visvaldas Kulbokas =

Lithuanian prelate of the Catholic Church (born 1974)

His Excellency, The Most Reverend Visvaldas Kulbokas
- Apostolic Nuncio to Ukraine; Titular Archbishop of Martanae Tudertinorum
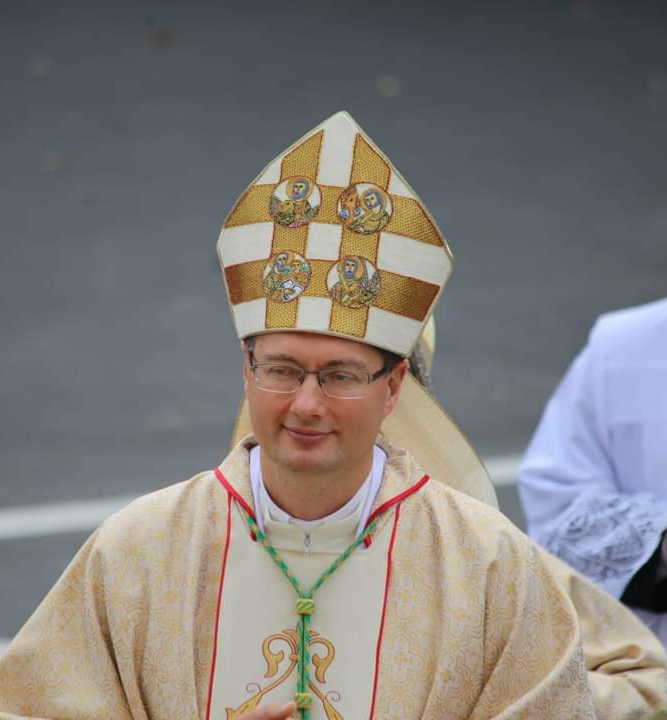
- Appointed: 15 June 2021
- Predecessor: Claudio Gugerotti
- Other post: Titular Archbishop of Martanae Tudertinorum

Personal details
- Born: Visvaldas Kulbokas; 14 May 1974 (age 52) Klaipėda, Lithuanian SSR
- Education: Telšiai Theological Seminary, Pontifical University of the Holy Cross, Pontifical Ecclesiastical Academy

Ordination history
History
Diaconal ordination
- Ordained by: Stanisław Ryłko
Priestly ordination
- Ordained by: Antanas Vaičius
Episcopal consecration
- Principal consecrator: Pietro Parolin
- Co-consecrators: Petar Rajič, Algirdas Jurevičius

Styles of Visvaldas Kulbokas
- Reference style: His Excellency; The Most Reverend
- Spoken style: Your Excellency
- Religious style: Archbishop

Visvaldas Kulbokas, JCL (born 14 May 1974) is a Lithuanian prelate of the Catholic Church and a diplomat in the service of the Holy See. He is serving as Apostolic Nuncio to Ukraine since 2021.

== Early years ==
Born in Klaipėda, Visvaldas Kulbokas in 1992 graduated from the local school and then entered the Telšiai Bishop Vincentas Borisevičius Priest Seminary. From 1994 to 2004 he studied in Rome, Italy, at the Pontifical University of the Holy Cross, where he received a doctorate in theology (2001) and a Licentiate of Canon Law (2004). During his studies, he was ordained to the priesthood for the Diocese of Telšiai by diocesan bishop Antanas Vaičius on 19 July 1998.

== Diplomatic service ==
To prepare for a diplomatic career, he entered the Pontifical Ecclesiastical Academy in 2001. He joined the Vatican's diplomatic service on 1 July 2004 and served as secretary to the nuntiature in Lebanon (2004–2007). In 2007–2009 he was an employee of the nunciature in the Netherlands and in Russia (2009–2012). From 2012 to 2020, he worked in the Section for Relations with States of the Secretariat of State of the Holy See. From 2020 to 2021 he was an adviser to the nunciature in Kenya.

== Nuncio ==
On 15 June 2021, Pope Francis appointed him Titular Archbishop of Martanae Tudertinorum and Apostolic Nuncio to Ukraine.

Kulbokas received his episcopal consecration on 14 August 2021 in the Cathedral Basilica of St Stanislaus and St Ladislaus of Vilnius from Cardinal Pietro Parolin, with Archbishops Petar Antun Rajič, Gintaras Grušas and Bishop Algirdas Jurevičius as co-consecrators.

== See also ==
- List of diplomatic missions of the Holy See
- List of heads of the diplomatic missions of the Holy See

Catholic Church titles
Preceded by Pier Giacomo De Nicolò	Titular Archbishop of Martanae Tudertinorum; 2021–present	Succeeded by Incumbent
Diplomatic posts
Preceded by Claudio Gugerotti	Apostolic Nuncio to Ukraine; 2021–present	Succeeded by Incumbent
