= Claudio Gugerotti =

Italian Roman Catholic cardinal

His Eminence Claudio Gugerotti
- Prefect of the Dicastery for the Eastern Churches
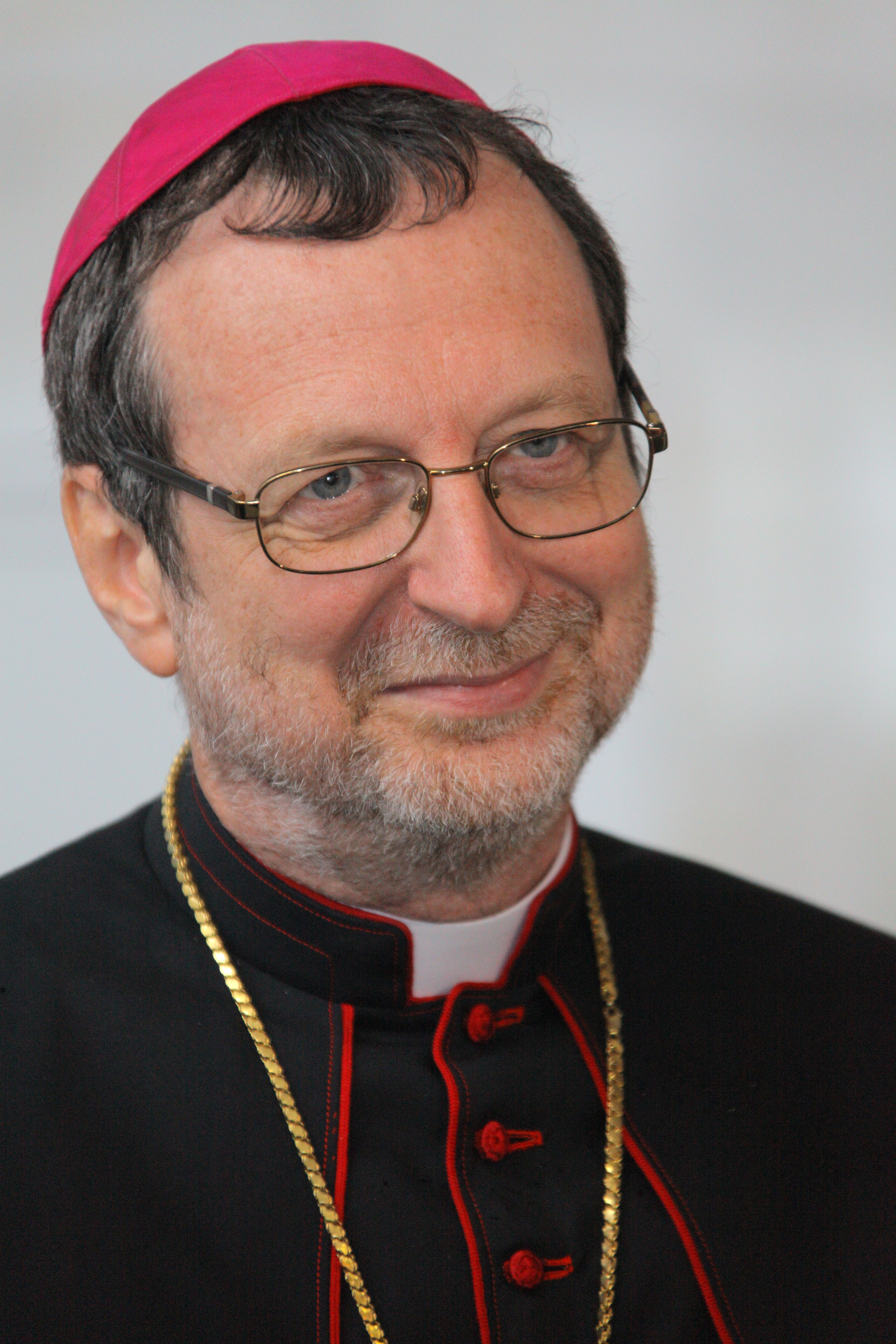
- Gugerotti in 2014.
- Church: Roman Catholic Church
- Appointed: 21 November 2022
- Installed: 16 January 2023
- Predecessor: Leonardo Sandri
- Other post: Cardinal-Deacon of Sant'Ambrogio della Massima
- Previous posts: Undersecretary of the Congregation for the Eastern Churches (1997–2001); Apostolic Nuncio to Armenia, Georgia and Azerbaijan (2001–2011); Apostolic Nuncio to Belarus (2011–2015); Apostolic Nuncio to Ukraine (2015–2020); Apostolic Nuncio to Great Britain (2020–2022); Titular Archbishop of Rebellum (2001–2023)

Orders
- Ordination: 29 May 1982 by Giuseppe Amari
- Consecration: 6 January 2002 by John Paul II
- Created cardinal: 30 September 2023 by Francis
- Rank: Cardinal Deacon

Personal details
- Born: 7 October 1955 (age 71) Verona, Italy
- Denomination: Roman Catholic
- Motto: Per orientalem viam

- Coat of arms

Styles of Claudio Gugerotti
- Reference style: His Eminence
- Spoken style: Your Eminence
- Religious style: Cardinal
- Informal style: Cardinal

Claudio Gugerotti (born 7 October 1955) is an Italian Catholic prelate who has served as prefect of the Dicastery for the Eastern Churches since 2022. He previously worked in the diplomatic service of the Holy See, serving as nuncio in several Eastern European countries between 2001 and 2020 and in Great Britain from 2020 to 2022. He joined the staff of the Dicastery for the Eastern Churches in 1985 and was its undersecretary from 1997 to 2001. He was named an archbishop in 2001. Pope Francis created him a cardinal in 2023.

== Biography ==
Claudio Gugerotti was born in Verona, Italy, on 7 October 1955 and was ordained a priest for the Diocese of Verona on 29 May 1982. He earned degrees in Eastern languages and literature and in sacred liturgy. He taught patristics at the San Zeno Theological Institute in Verona from 1981 to 1984, and theology and Eastern liturgy at the Institute of Ecumenical Studies in Verona from 1982 to 1985. In 1985, he joined the Roman Curia, working at the Congregation for the Eastern Churches; he became its undersecretary on 17 December 1997. He has also taught patristics and Armenian language and literature at the Pontifical Oriental Institute.

Gugerotti had not trained at the Pontifical Ecclesiastical Academy as is standard practice for nuncios. On 7 December 2001, Pope John Paul II appointed him Apostolic Nuncio to Georgia and to Armenia, as well as Titular Archbishop of Ravello. He was also appointed Apostolic Nuncio to Azerbaijan on 13 December. He received his episcopal consecration from John Paul on 6 January 2002.

Gugerotti speaks beside his mother tongue Italian, Armenian, English, Greek, Kurdish and Russian.

Pope Benedict XVI appointed him Apostolic Nuncio to Belarus on 15 July 2011.

On 13 November 2015, Pope Francis appointed him Apostolic Nuncio to Ukraine.

On 4 July 2020, Pope Francis appointed him Apostolic Nuncio to Great Britain.

On 21 November 2022, Pope Francis appointed him Prefect of the Dicastery for the Eastern Churches.

On 9 July 2023, Pope Francis announced he plans to make him a cardinal at a consistory scheduled for 30 September. At that consistory he was made Cardinal-Deacon of Sant'Ambrogio della Massima.

He participated as a cardinal elector in the 2025 papal conclave that elected Pope Leo XIV.

On 27 October 2025 met Alexander Lukashenko of Belarus.

== Controversy ==
In September 2026, Patriarch Ignatius Yousef III Younan of the Syriac Catholic Church alleged that Claudio Gugerotti was orchestrating for his, as well as his fellow Eastern Catholic patriarchs', removal. He further claimed that “most of the patriarchs are not so happy with the prefect’s behavior”.

== See also ==
- Cardinals created by Francis
- List of heads of the diplomatic missions of the Holy See

Catholic Church titles
Preceded by Marco Dino Brogi, OFM	Under-Secretary of Congregation for the Oriental Churches; 17 December 1997 – 7 December 2001	Succeeded by Krzysztof Nitkiewicz
Diplomatic posts
Preceded by Peter Stephan Zurbriggen	Apostolic Nuncio to Armenia; 7 December 2001–15 July 2011	Succeeded by Marek Solczyński
Preceded by Peter Stephan Zurbriggen	Apostolic Nuncio to Georgia; 17 December 2001 – 15 July 2011	Succeeded by Marek Solczyński
Preceded by Peter Stephan Zurbriggen	Apostolic Nuncio to Azerbaijan; 13 December 2001 – 15 July 2011	Succeeded by Marek Solczyński
Preceded by Martin Vidović	Apostolic Nuncio to Belarus; 15 July 2011 – 13 November 2015	Succeeded by Gábor Pintér
Preceded by Thomas Edward Gullickson	Apostolic Nuncio to Ukraine; 13 November 2015 – 4 July 2020	Succeeded by Visvaldas Kulbokas
Preceded by Edward Joseph Adams	Apostolic Nuncio to Great Britain; 4 July 2020 – 21 November 2022	Succeeded by Miguel Maury Buendía
Catholic Church titles
Preceded by Leonardo Cardinal Sandri	Prefect of Dicastery for the Eastern Churches; 21 November 2022 – present	Succeeded by incumbent
