= Ignazio Ceffalia =

Italian aposolic nuncio (born 1975)

His Excellency, The Most Reverend Ignazio Ceffalia
- Apostolic Nuncio to Belarus; Titular Archbishop of Fiorentino
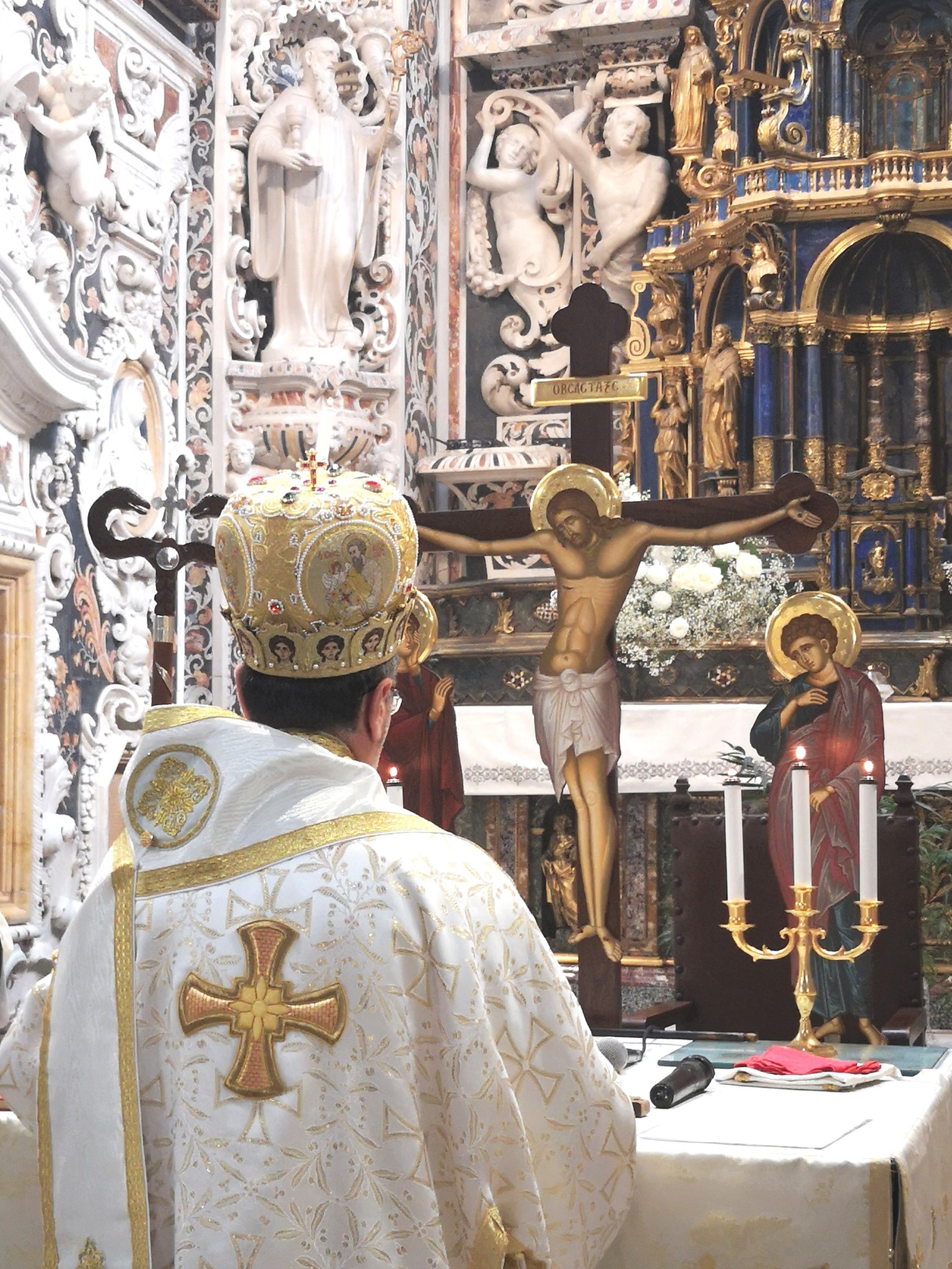
- Appointed: 25 March 2025
- Predecessor: Ante Jozić
- Other post: Titular Archbishop of Fiorentino

Orders
- Ordination: 6 August 2003
- Consecration: 22 May 2025 by Pietro Parolin, Francesco Montenegro and Paul Gallagher

Personal details
- Born: 28 April 1975 (age 51) Palermo, Italy
- Motto: Ego Autem In Te Speravi
- Coat of arms

Styles of Ignazio Ceffalia
- Reference style: His Excellency; The Most Reverend
- Spoken style: Your Excellency
- Religious style: Archbishop

Ignazio Ceffalia (born 28 April 1975) is an Italo-Albanian hierarch of the Italo-Albanian Catholic Church who works in the diplomatic service of the Holy See.

== Biography ==
Ignazio Ceffalia was born on 28 April 1975 in Palermo, Italy, from a family of Piana degli Albanesi belonging to the historic Albanian community of Italy of Catholic-Byzantine tradition. He was ordained a priest in the Piana degli Albanesi Cathedral for the Eparchy of Piana degli Albanesi on 6 August 2003.

He knows Italian, Albanian, French, English and Spanish; liturgically he also uses Ancient Greek as per the tradition of the Italo-Albanian Church.

== Diplomatic career ==
On 1 July 2006, he entered the Holy See diplomatic service and has served in the apostolic nunciatures of Ecuador, Thailand, the Permanent Mission to the Council of Europe in Strasbourg, the Section for Relations with States and International Organizations of the Secretariat of State, and finally nunciature counselor in Venezuela.

On 25 March 2025, Pope Francis appointed him Titular Archbishop of Fiorentino and Apostolic Nuncio to Belarus. He was consecrated as an archbishop on 22 May 2025.

== See also ==
- Arbëreshë people
- Eparchy of Piana degli Albanesi
- Italo-Albanian Catholic Church
- List of heads of the diplomatic missions of the Holy See
