= Paolo Borgia =

Italian Catholic prelate (b. 1966)

His Excellency, The Most Reverend Paolo Borgia
- Apostolic Nuncio to Lebanon; Titular Archbishop of Milazzo
- Church: Catholic Church
- Appointed: 24 September 2022
- Predecessor: Joseph Spiteri
- Other post: Titular Archbishop of Milazzo
- Previous post: Apostolic Nuncio to Côte d'Ivoire (2019-2022)

Orders
- Ordination: 10 April 1999 by Vincenzo D’Addario
- Consecration: 4 October 2019 by Pope Francis

Personal details
- Born: 18 March 1966 (age 60) Manfredonia (Foggia), Italy
- Motto: Visitabit nos oriens ex alto (the dawn from on high shall break upon us)
- Coat of arms

Styles of Paolo Borgia
- Reference style: His Excellency; The Most Reverend
- Spoken style: Your Excellency
- Religious style: Archbishop

Paolo Borgia (born 18 March 1966) is an Italian prelate of the Catholic Church who has worked in the diplomatic service of the Holy See since 2001. He has been the apostolic nuncio to Lebanon since 2022, and was previously the apostolic nuncio to Ivory Coast from 2019 to 2022.

== Biography ==
Borgia was born in Manfredonia (Foggia) and was ordained a priest on 10 April 1999. He studied canon law and prepared for a diplomatic career at the Pontifical Ecclesiastical Academy.

== Diplomatic career ==
He entered the diplomatic service of the Holy See on 1 December 2001 and was posted to the Nunciature to the Central African Republic with the rank of Attaché. He was promoted to secretary (second class) on 1 December 2002. In 2004 he was transferred to Mexico, where he served until 2004.

He was again promoted in 2006, becoming first secretary. He was posted to Israel in 2007 and was promoted to counsellor three years later. After his posting in Israel he served in Lebanon from 2010, where he worked with Archbishop Gabriele Giordano Caccia. He returned to Rome to work in the Second Section in 2013 and was transferred to the Section for General Affairs on 29 October 2014. He was promoted to counsellor, first class, on 1 December 2014.

Pope Francis appointed him to serve as Assessor for General Affairs on 4 March 2016.

On 3 September 2019, Pope Francis named him titular archbishop of Milazzo and gave him the title of apostolic nuncio. He received his episcopal consecration from Francis on 4 October.

On 28 October 2019, Pope Francis named him Apostolic Nuncio to the Côte d'Ivoire.

On 24 September 2022, Pope Francis named him Apostolic Nuncio to the Lebanon.

On 16 March 2026, during the 2026 Lebanon war, Borgia visited southern Christian towns caught in the crossfire between Hezbollah and Israel, including Ain Ebel, Rmaish, and Debel, to deliver humanitarian aid and convey a message of solidarity from Pope Leo XIV. On 8 April, after another visit to southern Lebanon with Bechara Boutros al-Rahi, patriarch of the Maronite Church, he called for a ceasefire to stabilize the country. After the 8 April 2026 Lebanon attacks, Borgia said that "there has never been an attack like this."

== See also ==
- List of heads of the diplomatic missions of the Holy See
