= Qarʽat aṭ-Ṭūbīyah =

Tunisian marshland

Coordinates: 36°55′0″N 9°38′0″E

Qarʽat aṭ-Ṭūbīyah is a locality and area of marshes located in Tunisia with an elevation above sea level of 214 meters. There are ruins from the Roman Empire nearby.

== See also ==
- Tubia in Mauretania
