= Apostolic Nunciature to Armenia =

Diplomatic Mission of the Holy See

- Location: Yerevan, Armenia
- Address: Northern Avenue 10/1, suite 17, 0010
- Ambassador: Ante Jozić

The Apostolic Nunciature to Armenia (Armenian: Առաքելական նունսիատուրա Հայաստանին, romanized: Arrak’elakan nunsiatura Hayastanin) is an ecclesiastical office of the Catholic Church in Armenia. It is a diplomatic mission of the Holy See, whose representative is called the Apostolic Nuncio with the rank of an ambassador. The title Apostolic Nuncio to Armenia is held by the prelate appointed Apostolic Nuncio to Georgia; he resides in Georgia.

== History ==
Armenia and the Holy See established diplomatic relations on 20 September 1992.

The Holy See, represented by Archbishop Edgar Peña Parra, inaugurated a new building in central Yerevan to house the nunciature in October 2021.

== Representatives of the Holy See to Armenia ==
Apostolic nuncios

- Jean-Paul Gobel (7 December 1993 – 6 December 1997)
- Peter Stephan Zurbriggen (13 June 1998 – 25 October 2001)
- Claudio Gugerotti (7 December 2001 – 15 July 2011)
- Marek Solczyński (15 December 2011 – 25 April 2017)
- José Avelino Bettencourt (1 March 2018 – 30 August 2023)
- Ante Jozić (28 June 2024 – present)

== See also ==
- Catholic Church in Armenia
- Foreign relations of Armenia
- Foreign relations of the Holy See
- List of diplomatic missions of the Holy See
