= Martin Vidović =

Croatian prelate of the Catholic Church (born 1953)

His Excellency, The Most Reverend Martin Vidović
- Apostolic Nuncio emeritus of Belarus; Titular Archbishop of Nona
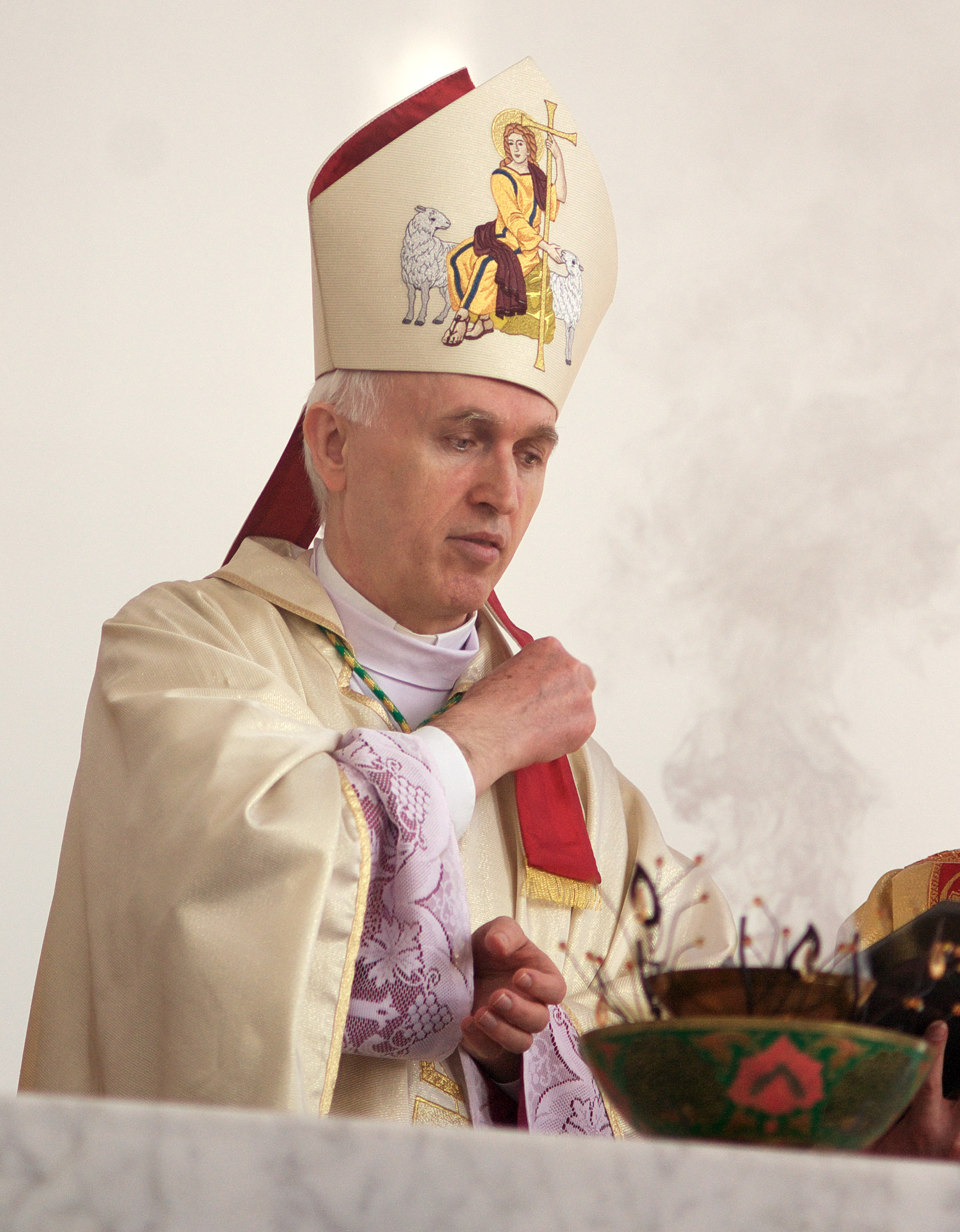
- Vidović in 2009
- Appointed: 15 September 2004
- Retired: 15 July 2011
- Predecessor: Ivan Jurkovič
- Successor: Claudio Gugerotti
- Other post: Titular Archbishop of Nona

Orders
- Ordination: 28 May 1989 by John Paul II
- Consecration: 21 November 2004 by Angelo Sodano, Vinko Puljić, and Marin Barišić

Personal details
- Born: July 15, 1953 (age 73) Vidonje, Croatia

Styles of Martin Vidović
- Reference style: His Excellency; The Most Reverend
- Spoken style: Your Excellency
- Religious style: Archbishop

Martin Vidović (born 15 July 1953) is a Croatian prelate of the Catholic Church who was Apostolic Nuncio to Belarus from 2004 to 2011.

Martin Vidović was born on 15 July 1953 in Vidonje, Croatia. He was ordained a priest on 28 May 1989.

He managed Croatian-language programming for Vatican Radio from 1983 to 1994.

== Diplomatic career ==
He entered the diplomatic service of the Holy See on 19 September 1994. Among other assignments, he was secretary of the nunciature in Bosnia-Herzegovina from 1994 to 1999.

On 15 September 2004, Pope John Paul II named him titular bishop of Nona and Apostolic Nuncio to Belarus. He received his episcopal consecration from Cardinal Angelo Sodano on 21 November at the Cathedral of St. Peter in Split.

He resigned as nuncio in 2011 after meeting with the country's political opposition as Vatican Secretary of State Cardinal Tarcisio Bertone and Pope Benedict XVI sought to negotiate with the government of Belarus President Alexander Lukashenko.

== See also ==
- List of heads of the diplomatic missions of the Holy See

Catholic Church titles
Preceded by Socrates Villegas	— TITULAR — Bishop of Nona; 15 September 2004 – present	Incumbent
