= Leonardo Sandri =

Argentine cardinal (born 1943)

His Eminence Leonardo Sandri
- Vice Dean of the College of Cardinals
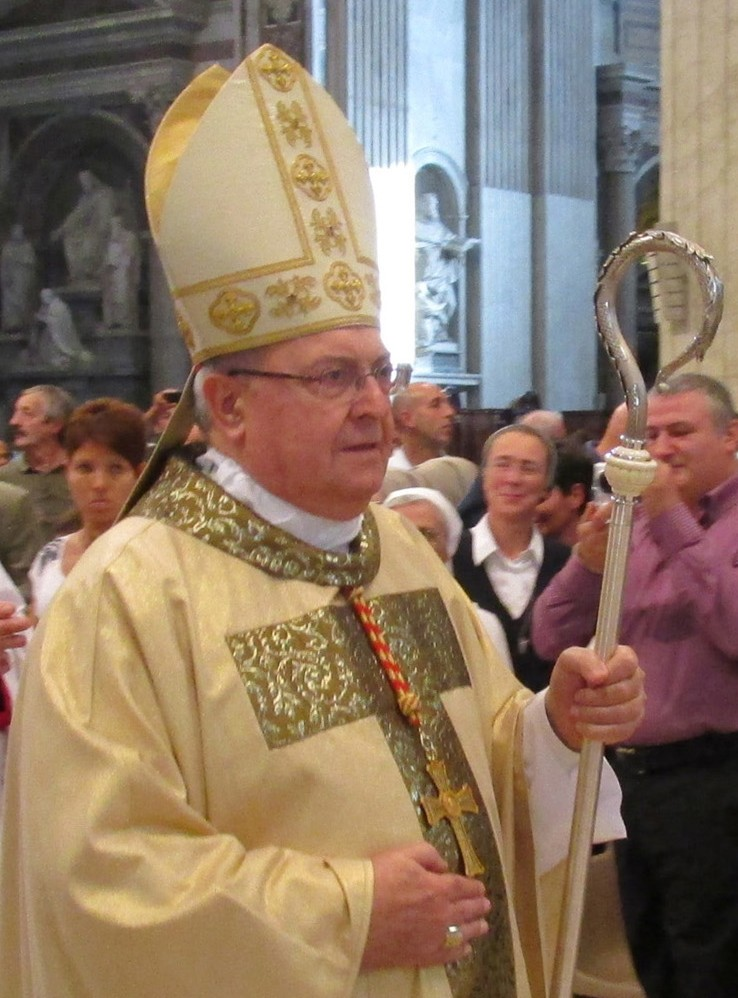
- Sandri in 2014
- Appointed: 18 January 2020
- Predecessor: Giovanni Battista Re
- Other post: Cardinal-Bishop of Santi Biagio e Carlo ai Catinari
- Previous posts: Titular Archbishop of Aemona (1997–2007); Apostolic Nuncio to Venezuela (1997–2000); Apostolic Nuncio to Mexico (2000); Substitute of the Secretariat of State (2000–2007); Prefect of the Congregation for the Oriental Churches (2007–2022)

Orders
- Ordination: 2 December 1967 by Juan Carlos Aramburu
- Consecration: 11 October 1997 by Angelo Sodano
- Created cardinal: 24 November 2007 by Pope Benedict XVI
- Rank: Cardinal-Deacon (2007–2018); Cardinal-Priest (2018); Cardinal-Bishop (2018–)

Personal details
- Born: 18 November 1943 (age 82) Buenos Aires, Argentina
- Denomination: Roman Catholic
- Motto: Ille fidelis (He remains faithful; 2 Timothy 2:13)
- Coat of arms: Leonardo Sandri's coat of arms

Leonardo Sandri (born 18 November 1943) is an Argentine prelate of the Catholic Church who has been a cardinal since November 2007 and vice dean of the College of Cardinals since January 2020. He was prefect of the Congregation for the Eastern Churches from 2007 to 2022. He served in the diplomatic service of the Holy See from 1974 to 1991 in several overseas assignments, including as a permanent observer of the Holy See before the Organization of American States from 1989 to 1991, and in Rome as Substitute for General Affairs in the Secretariat of State from 1999 to 2007.

== Biography ==
=== Early life and career ===
Sandri was born in Buenos Aires to Antonio Enrico Sandri and Nella Righi, who had emigrated to Argentina from Ala, a village in Trentino in Italy. He studied humanities, philosophy and theology at the Metropolitan Seminary of Buenos Aires, and earned a Licentiate in Theology from the Pontifical Catholic University of Argentina. On 2 December 1967 he was ordained to the priesthood by Archbishop Juan Carlos Aramburu and became his secretary.

He also served as curate of Nuestra Señora del Carmen in Villa Urquiza until 1970. He then studied at the Pontifical Gregorian University, where he obtained a doctorate in canon law, and at the Pontifical Latin American College. In 1971, he entered the Pontifical Ecclesiastical Academy, which trains papal diplomats.

=== Diplomat and curial official ===
In 1974, Sandri became an official of the Apostolic Nunciature in Madagascar and Mauritius, which also serves as the Apostolic Delegation in the islands of Comoros and Réunion in the Indian Ocean. He then served in the Vatican Secretariat of State, as secretary of the Substitute for General Affairs, including future cardinals Eduardo Martinez Somalo and Edward Cassidy from 1977 to 1989; and in the Apostolic Nunciature in the United States as permanent observer of the Holy See before the Organization of American States, from 1989 to 1991.

He became regent of the Prefecture of the Pontifical Household on 22 August 1991 and assessor of the Section for General Affairs in the Secretariat of State on 2 April 1992.

On 22 July 1997, Sandri was appointed Apostolic Nuncio to Venezuela and Titular Archbishop of Aemona by Pope John Paul II. He received his episcopal consecration on the following 11 October from Cardinal Angelo Sodano, with Cardinal Aramburu and Archbishop Giovanni Battista Re serving as co-consecrators, at St. Peter's Basilica. He selected as his episcopal motto: "Ille Fidelis", meaning, "He (Christ) remains faithful" (2 Timothy 2:13). He was the first Argentinian to hold the title of Apostolic Nuncio. After two years in Venezuela, he was named Apostolic Nuncio to Mexico on 1 March 2000. During his brief tenure there he was tasked with restraining the Mexican bishops from intervening in political affairs.

Coat of arms of Cardinal Sandri

On 16 September 2000, he was named Substitute for General Affairs, a key position within the Roman Curia, serving essentially as the chief of staff of the Secretariat of State.

As Pope John Paul II's health declined, Sandri would read aloud the texts that the Pope could not deliver himself. On the evening of 2 April 2005, he announced the Pope's death from Saint Peter's Square, saying "We all feel like orphans this evening."

==== Theodore McCarrick controversy ====
On 11 October 2006, while still serving in his sensitive position in the Vatican Secretariat of State, Sandri sent a letter to Father Boniface Ramsey, a New York City pastor who was a seminary professor from 1986 to 1996. Sandri did not mention McCarrick, but referred to "the serious matters involving some of the students of the Immaculate Conception Seminary, which in November 2000 you were good enough to bring confidentially to the attention of the then Apostolic Nuncio in the United States, the late Archbishop Gabriel Montalvo." Ramsey's 2000 letter was about complaints of sexual abuse of seminarians on the part of Cardinal Theodore McCarrick when he was Archbishop of Newark (1986–2000). Ramsey made Sandri's letter public on 7 September 2018 to document that his letter to Montalvo had reached Rome and that the highest levels of the Vatican had long been aware of his charges against McCarrick. By then, McCarrick had resigned from the College of Cardinals, but he still faced a Church trial. In February 2019, the same month McCarrick was laicized by the Vatican, an image of Sandri's 2006 letter was published by the media; it accompanied a Commonweal article that Ramsey wrote. On 5 February 2020, journalist Thomas J. Reese cited the Sandri-Ramsey correspondence in calling for a full review of the Secretariat's files as part of the Vatican investigation into McCarrick and in order to determine who in the Vatican's highest levels knew what about the charges against McCarrick.

=== Congregation for the Oriental Churches ===
On 9 June 2007, Sandri was appointed prefect of the Congregation for the Oriental Churches by Pope Benedict XVI. Succeeding Ignatius I Daoud, he headed the curial congregation that handles matters regarding the Eastern Catholic Churches and became the ex officio Grand Chancellor of the Pontifical Oriental Institute. Pope Francis confirmed that appointment on 19 February 2014.

Sandri visited the Holy Land in February 2008. In April 2009, he lamented the emigration of Christians from that region: "This lack of peace makes Christians emigrate and leave their land behind. So we're left with a purely geological, physical presence of Jesus, and not with the presence of those that grew with him and lived his faith, and that continue to follow him today like disciples of his very homeland." In 2014 he called for an end to the forced removal of Christians from Iraq and Syria, saying that more than 100,000 Christians had left their homes in Iraq and "now wander to the city of Erbil in impossible conditions".

One analysis of the delay in the canonization process for John Paul II pointed to, among other things, Sandri's apparent reluctance to testify in the effort.

In November 2014, the Vatican lifted its 1929 ban on the ordination of married men to the priesthood by Eastern Catholic churches outside their traditional territories, including in the United States, Canada and Australia. Sandri signed the decree on 14 June 2014.

=== Cardinal ===
Styles of Leonardo Sandri
- Reference style: His Eminence
- Spoken style: Your Eminence
- Informal style: Cardinal

Benedict XVI created him Cardinal-Deacon of San Carlo ai Catinari in the consistory of 24 November 2007. He delivered the message of thanksgiving to the pope on behalf of the new cardinals on that occasion.

In April 2008, Sandri said that although the regime of Saddam Hussein was dictatorial, it is undeniable that Iraqi clergy and laity felt more secure under his regime and that their liturgical life went on undisturbed.

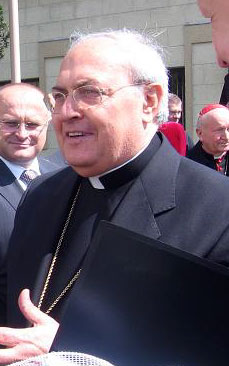
Cardinal Leonardo Sandri, 2008

He was mentioned in the press as papabile, a possible candidate for election to the papacy at the time of the resignation of Pope Benedict XVI in 2013.

Sandri is also a member of the Congregation for the Doctrine of the Faith, Congregation for the Evangelization of Peoples, Pontifical Council for Promoting Christian Unity, Pontifical Council for Interreligious Dialogue, Pontifical Council for Legislative Texts, Pontifical Commission for Latin America and Pontifical Commission for Vatican City State. On 2 March 2010 he was appointed a member of the Congregation for Bishops. On 31 May 2011 he was appointed a member of the Apostolic Signatura. On 12 June 2012 Cardinal Sandri was appointed a member of the Congregation for Catholic Education.

Sandri, as Prefect of the Congregation for the Oriental Churches, was named by Pope Benedict XVI as one of four co-presidents of the Special Synod of Bishops for the Middle East held at the Vatican in October 2010. He speaks English, French, German, Italian and Spanish.

In June 2005, Archbishop Sandri was awarded Knight Grand Cross of the Order of Merit of the Italian Republic.

He opted for the order of Cardinal-Priests on 19 May 2018. Pope Francis raised him to the rank of Cardinal-Bishop effective 28 June 2018. On 24 January 2020, Pope Francis approved his election as Vice Dean of the College of Cardinals by the nine Latin-rite cardinal-bishops. Pope Francis approved his election to a second five-year term as vice dean on 14 January 2025.

Pope Francis named Archbishop Claudio Gugerotti to succeed him as prefect on 21 November 2022.

== Bibliography ==
- Leonardo Sandri, La problematica del "organo" en la teoria juridica civil y canonica, Pontificia universitas gregoriana, Rome, 1978. OCLC 913279417 (doctoral dissertation)

Diplomatic posts
Preceded by Crescenzio Sepe	Assessor for General Affairs; 2 April 1992 – 22 July 1997	Succeeded by James Michael Harvey
Preceded by Oriano Quilici	Apostolic Nuncio to Venezuela; 22 July 1997 – 1 March 2000	Succeeded by André Dupuy
Preceded by Justo Mullor García	Apostolic Nuncio to Mexico; 1 March 2000 – 16 September 2000	Succeeded by Giuseppe Bertello
Catholic Church titles
Preceded by Dino Monduzzi	Regent of the Papal Household; 22 August 1991 – 2 April 1992	Succeeded by Paolo De Nicolò
Preceded by Maximino Romero de Lema	— TITULAR — Titular Archbishop of Novigrad; 22 July 1997 – 24 November 2007	Succeeded by Beniamino Pizziol
Preceded by Giovanni Battista Re	Substitute for General Affairs; 16 September 2000 – 1 July 2007	Succeeded by Fernando Filoni
Preceded by Ignatius Moses I Daoud	Prefect of the Congregation for the Oriental Churches; 1 July 2007 – 21 November 2022	Succeeded by Claudio Gugerotti
Preceded by Ignatius Moses I Daoud	Grand Chancellor of the Pontifical Oriental Institute; 1 July 2007 – 21 November 2022	Succeeded by Claudio Gugerotti
Preceded by Angelo Felici	Cardinal Deacon of Santi Biagio e Carlo ai Catinari; 24 November 2007 – 19 May 2018	Himself as Cardinal Priest
Himself as Cardinal Deacon	Cardinal Priest 'pro hac vice' of Santi Biagio e Carlo ai Catinari; 19 May 2018 – 28 June 2018	Himself as Cardinal Bishop
Himself as Cardinal Priest	Cardinal Bishop of Santi Biagio e Carlo ai Catinari; 28 June 2018 – present	Incumbent
Preceded by Giovanni Battista Re	Vice-Dean of the College of Cardinals; 18 January 2020 – present	Incumbent
