= Tubia in Mauretania =

Former Roman Catholic see in North Africa

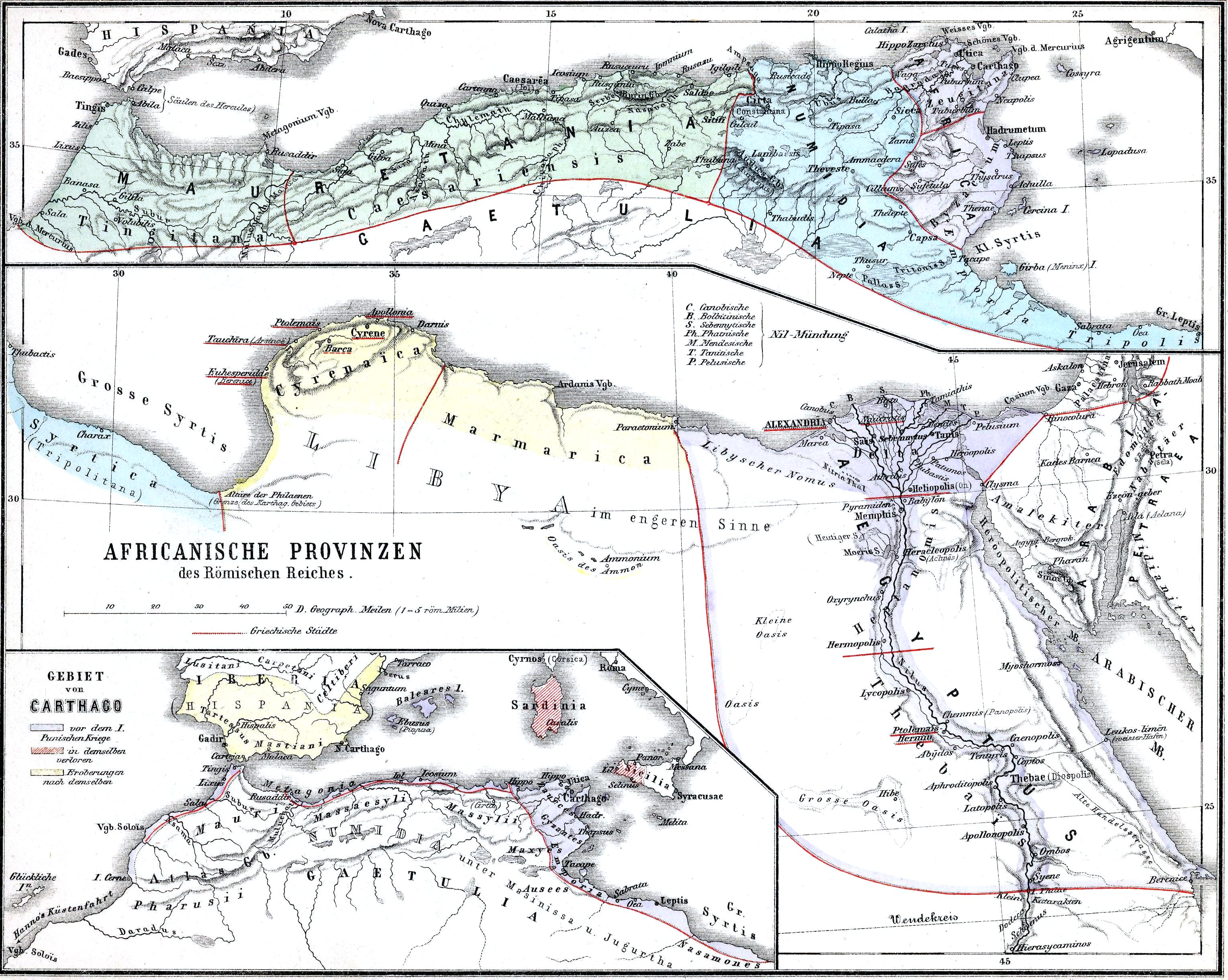
Roman North Africa

The Diocese of Tubia (Dioecesis Tubiensis) is a suppressed and titular see in the province of Mauritania Caesariensis of the Roman Catholic Church. Tubia was a city in North Africa during the Roman, Byzantine and Vandal empires that is identifiable with the ruins of Henchir-Toubia (Qar`at aţ Ţūbīyah).

== Bishopric ==
Felix was the only known bishop of this African diocese from antiquity. He is known as he took part in the Council of Carthage (411), between Catholic and Donatist bishops of Roman Africa. (Felix was a Catholic)

Today Tubia survives as titular bishopric, the current bishop is José Cayetano Parra Novo.

=== Known bishops ===
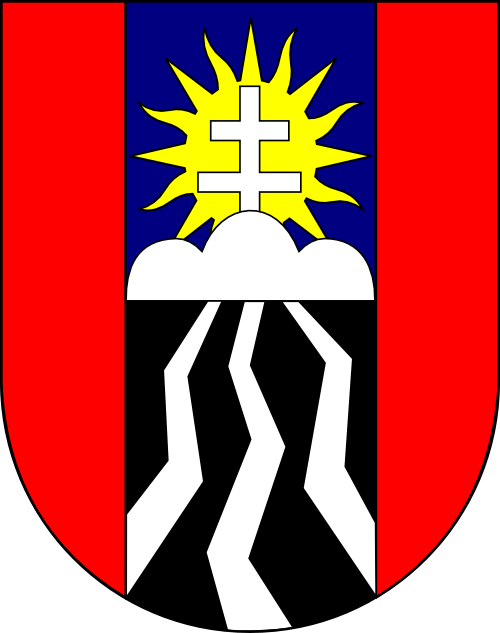
Coat of arms of the bishop

- Felix (fl 411 )
- Pierre-Jean-Marie-Louis Peurois, OFM † (May 25, 1936 – March 13, 1959)
- Alfred Bengsch (May 2, 1959 – August 16, 1961, Bishop of Berlin)
- Théophile Mbemba (11 November 1961 – 23 May 1964 of Brazzaville)
- Juozapas Pletkus (8 November 1967 – 29 September 1975)
- Otto Wüst (27 November 1975 – 21 September 1982 bishop of Basel)
- Dominik Hrušovský (18 December 1982 – 27 July 2016 Belarus).
- José Cayetano Parra Novo, from 11 November 2016.

== See also ==
- Tubunae, another town and bishopric in Roman Algeria.
