= Gabriel Montalvo Higuera =

Bolivian Catholic prelate and diplomat

- Apostolic Nuncio to the United States of America
- Church: Catholic Church
- In office: 7 December 1998 – 17 December 2005
- Predecessor: Agostino Cacciavillan
- Successor: Pietro Sambi
- Other post: Titular Archbishop of Celene (1974-2006)
- Previous posts: President of the Pontifical Ecclesiastical Academy (1993-1998); Apostolic Nuncio to Yugoslavia (1986-1996); Apostolic Pro-Nuncio to Belarus (1993-1994); Apostolic Delegate to Libya (1980-1986); Apostolic Pro-Nuncio to Tunisia and Algeria (1980-1986); Apostolic Nuncio to Honduras and Nicaragua (1974-1980)

Orders
- Ordination: 18 January 1953 by Crisanto Luque Sánchez
- Consecration: 30 June 1974 by Pope Paul VI

Personal details
- Born: 27 January 1930 Bogotá, Colombia
- Died: 2 August 2006 (aged 76) Rome, Italy

Gabriel Montalvo Higuera (27 January 1930 – 2 August 2006) was a Colombian prelate of the Catholic Church who worked in the diplomatic service of the Holy See for fifty years, with the title of archbishop and the rank of nuncio from 1974. His assignments included terms as nuncio in Central America, northern Africa, Yugoslavia and the United States.

== Biography ==
Gabriel Montalvo Higuera was born 27 January 1930, in Bogota, Colombia. His father was at one time Colombian ambassador to the Holy See. Montalvo was ordained a priest on 18 January 1953. In preparation for a diplomat's career, he completed the course of study at the Pontifical Ecclesiastical Academy in 1954.

He served at various papal embassies in Bolivia, Argentina and El Salvador before being assigned to the Vatican's Secretariat of State to work on Eastern-bloc relations.

On 14 June 1974, he was appointed titular archbishop of Celene and Apostolic Nuncio to Honduras and Nicaragua. He was consecrated a bishop on 30 June 1974 by Pope Paul VI. The following December, after Sandanista rebels kidnapped a number of hostages, Montalvo was one of those who accompanied the kidnappers' flight to Havana in order to insure their safety.

On 18 March 1980, Pope John Paul II appointed him Apostolic Pro-Nuncio to Algeria and Tunisia and Apostolic Delegate to Libya. He was recalled to Rome in 1982 to assist with the Vatican's successful arbitration of the dispute between Chile and Argentina over the Beagle Channel.

On 12 June 1986, he was appointed Apostolic Pro-Nuncio to Yugoslavia.

On 17 April 1993, he was given additional responsibility as Apostolic Nuncio to Belarus. Just two weeks later, on 29 April 1993, he was named President of the Pontifical Ecclesiastical Academy, a post he held until 1998 while continuing in Belarus until 1994 and in Yugoslavia until 1996.

Pope John Paul appointed him Apostolic Nuncio to the United States on 7 December 1998. He was also Permanent Observer of the Holy See to the Organization of American States the same day.

In 2000 Montalvo promptly forwarded to the Secretariat a letter that reported rumors of inappropriate behavior with seminarians on the part of Cardinal Theodore McCarrick. When the letter's author had hesitated to put his charges in writing, fearful that he would suffer reprisals if McCarrick ever saw it, Montalvo insisted he write saying "What do you think we are, fools? Send the letter." On 6 December 2005, Paul Bootkoski, then Bishop of Metuchen, New Jersey, informed Montalvo of three complaints regarding inappropriate sexual behavior by McCarrick, first by phone, and then in writing. Two were made by former priests; the third was hearsay relayed by someone who did not believe it.

On 17 December 2005, Montalvo retired as Apostolic Nuncio to the United States, at the mandatory age of seventy-five. Despite his long tenure as nuncio, he was a little-known public figure in the United States, where he shunned media attention..He died of lung cancer at a hospice in Rome on 2 August 2006.

== See also ==
- Apostolic Nunciature to the United States
- Apostolic Nuncio
- Cardinal Theodore McCarrick
- Catholic Church sex abuse cases in the United States

Diplomatic posts
Preceded by Agostino Cacciavillan	Apostolic Nuncio to the United States; 7 December 1998 – 17 December 2005	Succeeded by Pietro Sambi
