= Dominik Hrušovský =

Slovak Roman Catholic archbishop (1926–2016)

Dominik Hrušovský (1 June 1926 – 27 July 2016) was a prelate of the Catholic Church who served outside his homeland during its years of Communist control, largely devoted to the pastoral care of Catholic Slovaks abroad. Late in his career he returned to Slovakia. He was also Apostolic Nuncio to Belarus.

== Biography ==
He was born in Veľká Maňa, Slovakia, on 1 June 1926. He began his theological studies in Bratislava and then from 1946 in Rome at the Pontifical Lateran University. Because of the Communist takeover of Czechoslovakia, he did not return home.

He was ordained on 23 December 1950 and worked as a pastor in the Diocese of Belluno. From 1955 to 1962 he taught philosophy and theology at the regional seminar in Viterbo. From 1962 to 1966 he was a member of the Slovak Catholic Mission in Paris. He then worked in the Slovak Institute of Sts. Cyril and Methodius in Rome and became its head in 1975.

On 18 December 1982, Pope John Paul II appointed him titular bishop of Tubia and assigned to him the pastoral care of Slovak Catholics in foreign lands. He was ordained a bishop on 6 January 1983, continuing to head the Institute of Sts. Cyril and Methodius. His mandate grew with the fall of communism, which allowed him to reach Slovak communities in the former Warsaw Pact countries of Eastern Europe.

On 24 September 1992, he was appointed Auxiliary Bishop of Archdiocese of Trnava and on 17 December was made vicar of that archdiocese for Bratislava. Following the establishment of Slovakia as an independent nation, the first meeting of the Bishops Conference of Slovakia elected Hrušovský Secretary General and Chair of the Commission on Slovaks Abroad on 4 April 1993.

On 30 January 1995, he was named to a five-year term as a member of the Pontifical Council for the Pastoral Care of Migrants and Itinerants.

On 13 April 1996, Pope John Paul II elevated him to titular archbishop of Tubia and named him Apostolic Nuncio to Belarus. He retired when his successor in Belarus was appointed on 28 July 2001.

Hrušovský died on 27 July 2016 in Nitra, Slovakia, where he spent the last years of his life in retirement.
