= María, Spain =

María
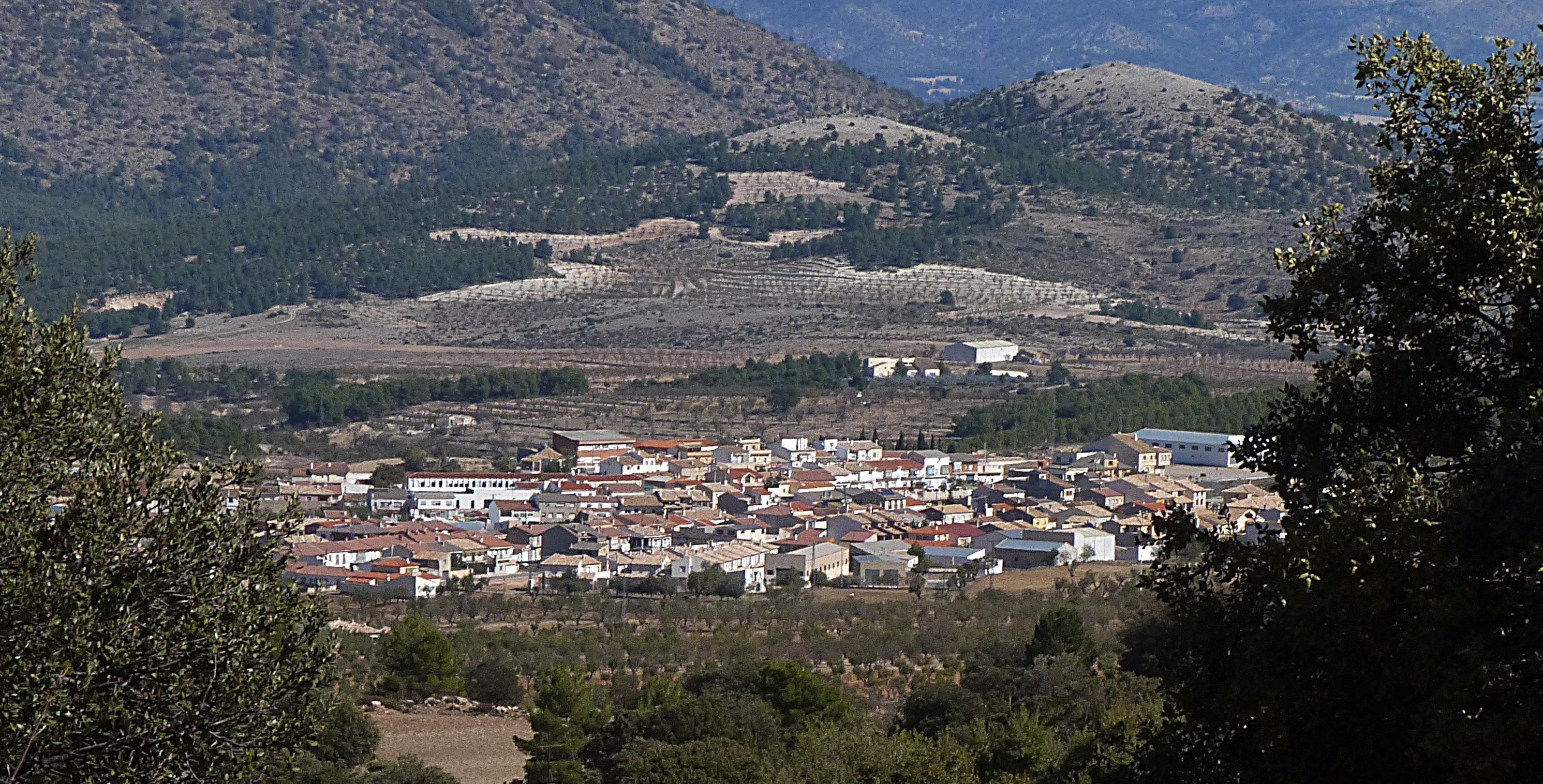

- Flag Seal

- Location of María María (Andalusia) María (Spain)
- Coordinates: 37°42′N 2°09′W
- Country: Spain
- Community: Andalusia
- Province: Almería
- Comarca: Los Vélez
- Municipality: María

Government
  - Mayor: Francisco Martínez Reina (PPA)

Area
  - Total: 225 km^{2} (87 sq mi)
- Elevation: 1,194 m (3,917 ft)

Population (2025-01-01)
  - Total: 1,202
  - Density: 5.34/km^{2} (13.8/sq mi)
- Time zone: UTC+1 (CET)
  - Summer (DST): UTC+2 (CEST)

María is a municipality of Almería province, in the autonomous community of Andalusia, Spain.

== Demographics ==
Historical population
Year	Pop.	±%
1999	1,685	—
2000	1,654	−1.8%
2001	1,643	−0.7%
2002	1,634	−0.5%
2003	1,595	−2.4%
2004	1,575	−1.3%
2005	1,565	−0.6%
Source: INE (Spain)

== See also ==
- List of municipalities in Almería
