= Apostolic Nunciature to Russia =

Diplomatic post of the Holy See

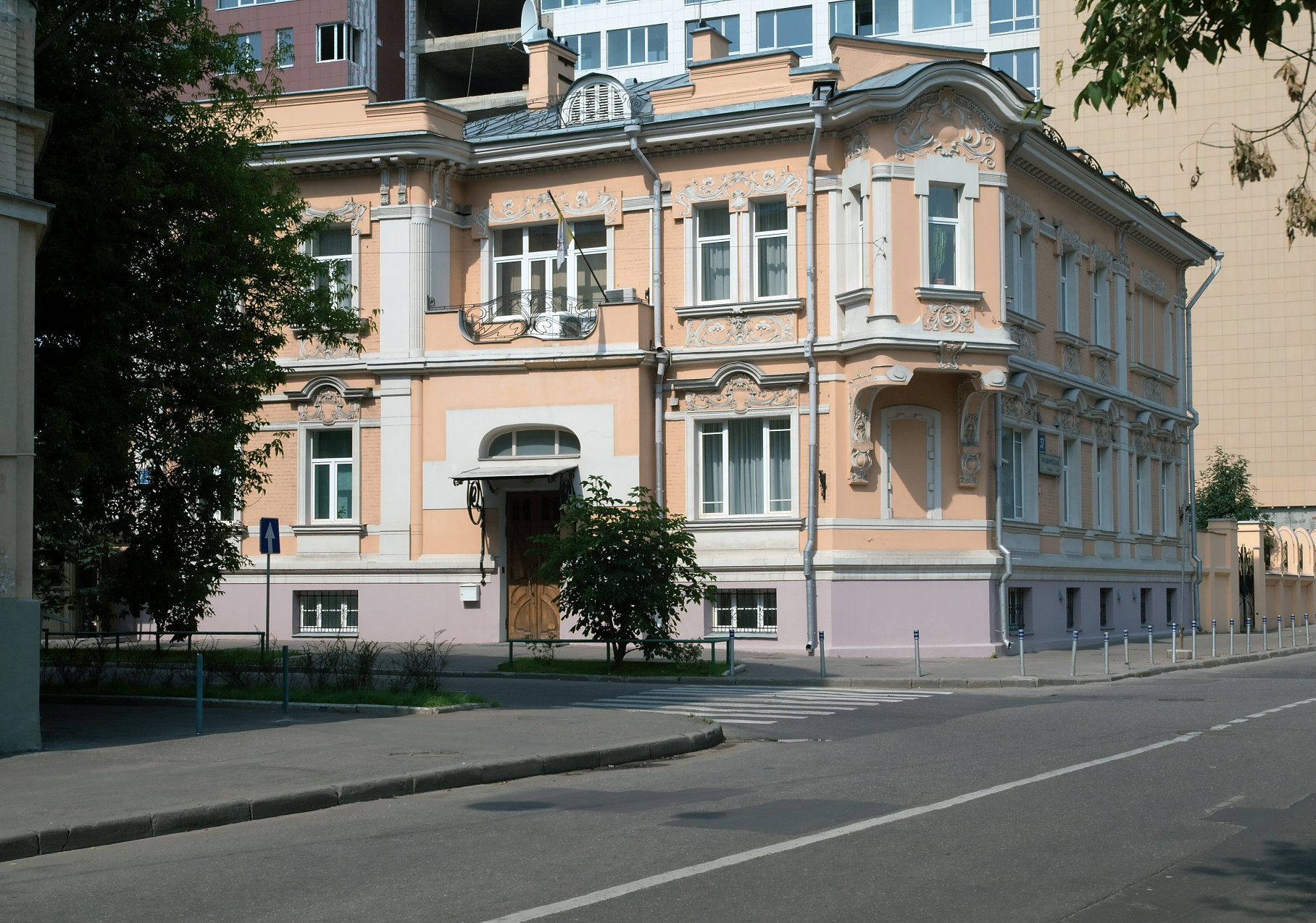
- Location: Moscow
- Address: 7/37 Vadkovsky Lane, Moscow, Russia
- Coordinates: 55.79086°N 37.59942°E
- Apostolic Nuncio: Giovanni d'Aniello

The Apostolic Nunciature to Russia is the diplomatic mission of the Holy See in the Russian Federation. It is located at 7/37 Vadkovsky Lane (Russian: Вадковский переулок, 7/37) in the Tverskoy District of Moscow. The Apostolic Nuncio to Russia is usually also the Apostolic Nuncio to Uzbekistan upon his appointment to said nation.

== History ==
The Soviet Union and Holy See established official relations 15 March 1990. On 5 September 1991 the Holy See recognized Russia as a successor to the USSR. Russia and the Holy See upgraded their diplomatic relations to full ambassadorial relations in 2009. The increased level of relations followed improvements in the working relationship between the Holy See and the Orthodox Patriarchate of Moscow. Prior to 2009, Russian officials remained wary of Catholic influence in Ukraine and tended to treat the Vatican as an international organization, and not a state in traditional sense.

The building on the corner of Vadkovsky Lane and Tikhvinskaya Street, former Markin house, was completed in 1903 by architect Pyotr Kharko (born 1871, year of death unknown). It was listed on the register of memorial buildings in May 2007. The building mixes traditional eclectic and Art Nouveau decoration, with notable wrought iron balcony grille and butterfly ornament on the main doors. In 2005-2008 an adjacent lot was developed into a 17-floor housing project, causing concerns about probable damage to the Nunciature building.

== Representatives ==
Apostolic nuncio

- Lorenzo Litta (11 February 1797 – May 1799)

Representative of the Holy See to the Soviet Union

- Francesco Colasuonno (15 March 1990 – 12 November 1994)

Representative of the Holy See to the Russian Federation

- John Bukovsky (20 December 1994 – 29 January 2000)
- Giorgio Zur (29 January 2000 – 8 October 2002)
- Antonio Mennini (6 November 2002 – 18 December 2010)

Apostolic Nuncios

- Ivan Jurkovič (19 February 2011 – 13 February 2016)
- Celestino Migliore (28 May 2016 – 11 January 2020)
- Giovanni d'Aniello (1 June 2020 – present)

== See also ==
- Holy See–Russia relations
- List of diplomatic missions of the Holy See
- Diplomatic missions in Russia
