= Giorgio Zur =

German archbishop (1930–2019)

His Excellency The Most Reverend Giorgio Zur
- Archbishop
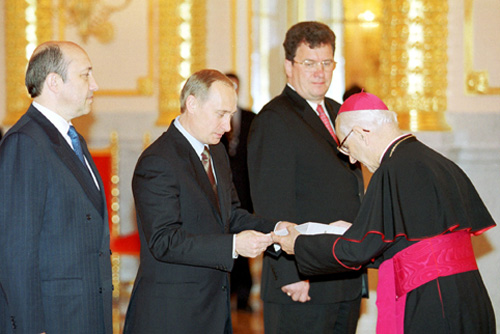
- Native name: Georg Zur
- See: Titular Archbishop of Sesta

Personal details
- Born: 15 February 1930 Görlitz, Lower Silesia, Weimar Republic
- Died: 8 January 2019 (aged 88) Vatican City

Giorgio Zur (15 February 1930 – 8 January 2019) was a Catholic archbishop and diplomat of the Holy See.

== Biography ==
The son of a master tailor, Giorgio Zur studied in Rome at the Gregorian University, where he obtained a licentiate in philosophy and theology and a doctorate in canon law. On 10 October 1955, he was ordained to the priesthood. After pastoral work as a chaplain in the Archdiocese of Bamberg, he entered the Pontifical Ecclesiastical Academy in 1960. He then entered the diplomatic service of the Holy See and fulfilled assignments in India, Mexico, Burundi, and Uganda.

Pope John Paul II appointed him on 5 February 1979 as the Titular Archbishop of Sesta and Apostolic Pro-Nuncio to Malawi and Zambia. He was consecrated on 24 February by Cardinal Jean-Marie Villot with co-consecrators Cardinal Agostino Casaroli and Archbishop Duraisamy Simon Lourdusamy. On 3 May 1985 Zur was appointed the Apostolic Nuncio to Paraguay. On 13 August 1990, Pope John Paul appointed him Pro-Nuncio to India and Nepal.

He was president of the Pontifical Ecclesiastical Academy from 1998 to 2000. Zur was named Nuncio to Russia on 29 January 2000. In the Russian Federation, Zur worked to improve relations with Patriarch Alexei II of Moscow, but his repeated protests against the Russian Government's expulsion of a Catholic bishop and several priests soon made his position untenable.

On 8 October 2002 he was appointed Nuncio to Austria. Having reached the age limit for bishops, he retired and took up residence in Rome.

== Awards ==
- Grand Gold Medal with Ribbon for Services to the Republic of Austria (2005)
- Great Cross of Merit with Star of the Federal Republic of Germany (2005)

Diplomatic posts
Preceded by Agostino Cacciavillan	Apostolic Nuncio to India; 13 August 1990 – 7 December 1998	Succeeded by Lorenzo Baldisseri
