= Apostolic Nunciature in the United States of America =

Diplomatic Mission of the Holy See in the United States of America

Apostolic Nunciature to the United States
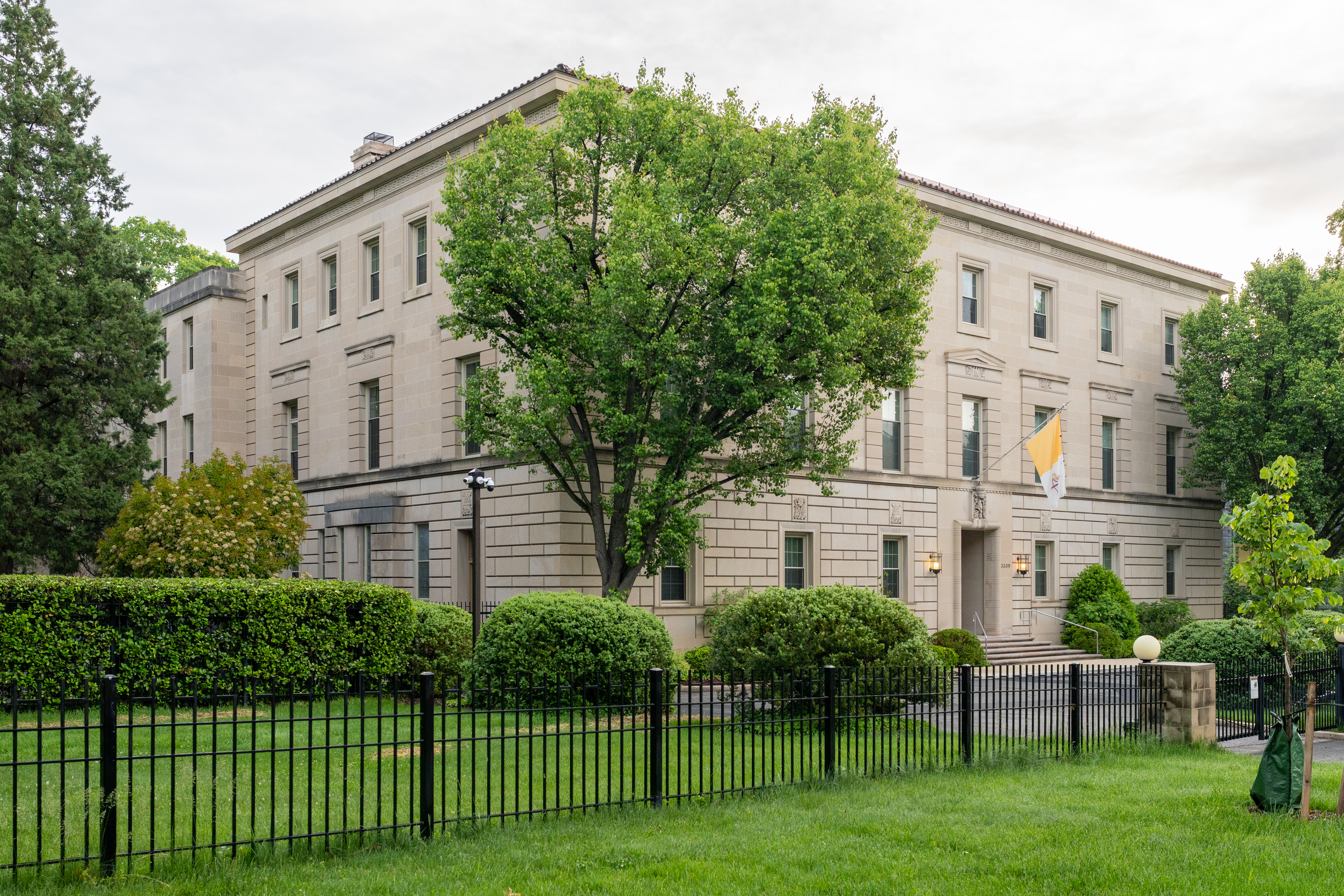
- The Apostolic Nunciature in Washington, D.C.
- Location: Washington, D.C. 20008
- Address: 3339 Massachusetts Avenue N.W., Washington, D.C., U.S.
- Coordinates: 38°55′28″N 77°3′56″W
- Apostolic Nuncio: Gabriele Giordano Caccia

The Apostolic Nunciature to the United States, sometimes referred to as the Vatican Embassy, is the diplomatic mission of the Holy See to the United States. It is located at 3339 Massachusetts Avenue, Northwest, Washington, D.C., in the Embassy Row neighborhood. Since 2026, the papal nuncio has been Archbishop Gabriele Giordano Caccia.

The Apostolic Nunciature to the United States is an ecclesiastical office of the Catholic Church in the United States, with the rank of an embassy. The nuncio serves both as the ambassador of the Holy See to the government of the United States and as delegate and point-of-contact between the Catholic hierarchy in America and the pope.

The Apostolic Nunciature is an administrative center of the Catholic Church in the United States. Communications from the United States Conference of Catholic Bishops and the various dioceses in the United States to the Holy See pass through the nunciature. The nuncio also fills a central role in the appointment of bishops in the U.S. and is the official responsible for announcing such appointments.

The physical building which houses the offices of the apostolic nuncio and his staff is called the Nunciature to the United States of America. It is exempt from the jurisdiction of the Archdiocese of Washington (canon 366 1°).

== History ==
Between 1848 and 1870, the United States of America and the Papal States maintained diplomatic relations (which were later broken off due to the anti-Catholic political climate), though not at the level of a nunciature and an embassy, but solely through a minister. Archbishop Gaetano Bedini played an important diplomatic role during his official mission in the 1850s.

The Apostolic Delegation to the United States was established on January 24, 1893, with offices in Washington, D.C.; it was led by an apostolic delegate. The delegation was the result of an effort by the Holy See to establish communication between Pope Leo XIII and President Benjamin Harrison. An apostolic delegate is an ecclesiastical official, rather than a diplomat, who represents the Holy See to the Catholic Church in his host country. Because the delegate was not recognized by the U.S. government, the Holy See was not restricted in its choice of delegate, and there were periods when two delegates served at the same time.

The Holy See usually names a pro-nuncio rather than a delegate in anticipation of the establishment of diplomatic relations. Diplomatic relations between the U.S. and the Vatican were established on January 10, 1984, the result of the close friendship between Pope John Paul II and President Ronald Reagan, and the delegation was elevated to the rank of nunciature on January 11. The Holy See's representative continued to be titled pro-nuncio because at the time, the Vatican only gave the title of nuncio to its ambassadors who were deans of the diplomatic corps in their host country. In 1990 and 1991, the Vatican quietly began using the title of nuncio for all its newly appointed ambassadors who were not the deans of a country's diplomatic corps, though it retained the pro-nuncio title for all those already appointed. (Note: Since 1993, the official Vatican yearbook, the Annuario Pontificio, has included an asterisk after the title of those nuncios "che (per ora) non sono Decani del Corpo Diplomatico" – "who (for now) are not deans of the diplomatic corps.")

At its establishment in 1893, the Apostolic Delegation occupied temporary quarters at the Catholic University of America, then from 1894 on a row of antebellum houses north of the United States Capitol. It moved in 1907 into a new home at 1811 Biltmore Street NW, designed for that purpose in 1905 by architect Albert Olszewski Von Herbulis (razed in 1973). The current site of the Apostolic Nunciature on Massachusetts Avenue was acquired in 1931 for $223,000 and the construction of the building, a three-story complex that includes a chancery, other offices and residential quarters, was completed in 1937 at a cost of $550,000. Designed by Frederick V. Murphy, the design, based on a Roman palazzo, features ample use of limestone and Art Deco influences.

The nunciature also houses the staff of the Holy See's permanent observer to the Organization of American States, which is headquartered in Washington.

== Representatives of the Holy See to the United States ==
Apostolic Delegates

- Francesco Satolli (January 14, 1893 – 1896)
- Sebastiano Martinelli, OSA (April 18, 1896 – 1902)
- Diomede Falconio, OFM (September 30, 1902 – 1911)
- Giovanni Bonzano (February 2, 1912 – December 11, 1922)
- Pietro Fumasoni Biondi (December 14, 1922 – March 16, 1933)
- Amleto Giovanni Cicognani (March 17, 1933 – November 14, 1959)
- Egidio Vagnozzi (December 16, 1958 – January 13, 1968)
- Luigi Raimondi (June 30, 1967 – March 21, 1973)
- Jean Jadot (May 23, 1973 – June 27, 1980)
- Pio Laghi (December 10, 1980 – March 26, 1984)

Apostolic Pro-Nuncios

- Pio Laghi (March 26, 1984 – April 6, 1990)
- Agostino Cacciavillan (June 13, 1990 – November 5, 1998)

Apostolic Nuncios

- Gabriel Montalvo Higuera (7 December 1998 – 17 December 2005)
- Pietro Sambi (17 December 2005 – 27 July 2011)
- Carlo Maria Viganò (19 October 2011 – 12 April 2016)
- Christophe Pierre (12 April 2016 – 7 March 2026)
- Gabriele Giordano Caccia (7 March 2026 – present)

== See also ==
- Apostolic Prefecture of the United States
- Holy See–United States relations
- United States Ambassadors to the Holy See
