= Joseph Spiteri =

Maltese prelate of the Catholic Church (born 1959)

His Excellency, The Most Reverend Joseph Spiteri
- Apostolic Nuncio to Mexico; Titular Archbishop of Serta
- Church: Roman Catholic
- Appointed: 7 July 2022
- Predecessor: Franco Coppola
- Other post: Titular Archbishop of Serta
- Previous posts: Apostolic Nuncio to Lebanon (2018-2022); Apostolic Nuncio to Cote d’Ivoire (2013-2018); Apostolic Nuncio to Sri Lanka (2009-2013)

Orders
- Ordination: 29 June 1984 by Joseph Mercieca
- Consecration: 24 May 2009 by Tarcisio Bertone, Paul Cremona and Joseph Mercieca

Personal details
- Born: May 20, 1959 (age 67) Sliema, Malta
- Motto: Communionis Donus Servare
- Coat of arms

Styles of Joseph Spiteri
- Reference style: His Excellency; The Most Reverend
- Spoken style: Your Excellency
- Religious style: Archbishop

Joseph Spiteri (born 20 May 1959) is a Maltese prelate of the Catholic Church who works in the diplomatic service of the Holy See. He has been Apostolic Nuncio to Mexico since July 2022.

== Biography ==
Joseph Spiteri was born on 20 May 1959 in Sliema Malta, though the family lived in Luqa. He was the first child born to Ernest Spiteri and Emmanuela née Cassar. After attending local seminaries he was ordained a priest on 29 June 1984 by Archbishop Joseph Mercieca in St John's Co-Cathedral in Valletta. After a brief pastoral assignment, he studied at the Pontifical Ecclesiastical Academy and earned a doctorate in canon law from the Pontifical University of Saint Thomas Aquinas in 1988.

== Diplomatic career ==
He joined the diplomatic service of the Holy See on 15 July 1988 and fulfilled assignments in Panama, Iraq, Mexico, Portugal, Greece and Venezuela, and then worked in the offices of the Secretariat of State in Rome.

On 21 February 2009, Pope Benedict XVI appointed him Apostolic Nuncio to Sri Lanka and Titular Archbishop of Serta. He was consecrated by Cardinal Tarcisio Bertone, with the Maltese archbishops Paul Cremona and Joseph Mercieca as co-consecrators, in St John's Co-Cathedral.

On 1 October 2013, Pope Francis appointed him Nuncio to the Côte d'Ivoire.

On 7 March 2018, Pope Francis named him Nuncio to Lebanon.

On 7 July 2022, Pope Francis named him Nuncio to Mexico.

== See also ==
- List of heads of the diplomatic missions of the Holy See
