= Pietro Antonio Da Ponte =

Italian Roman Catholic prelate

Most Reverend Pietro Antonio Da Ponte
- Bishop of Troia
- Church: Catholic Church
- Diocese: Diocese of Troia
- In office: 1607–1622
- Predecessor: Jacopo Aldobrandini
- Successor: Giovanni Battista Roviglioni
- Previous post: Apostolic Nuncio to Gratz (1610–1613)

Orders
- Consecration: 20 May 1607 by Marcello Lante della Rovere

Personal details
- Born: 1574 Naples, Italy
- Died: 8 September 1622 (age 48) Troia, Italy

Pietro Antonio Da Ponte, C.R. (1574–1622) was a Roman Catholic prelate who served as Bishop of Troia (1607–1622) and Apostolic Nuncio to Gratz (1610–1613).

== Biography ==
Pietro Antonio Da Ponte was born in Naples, Italy in 1574 and ordained a priest in the Congregation of Clerics Regular of the Divine Providence. On 14 May 1607, he was appointed during the papacy of Pope Paul V as Bishop of Troia. On 20 May 1607, he was consecrated bishop by Marcello Lante della Rovere, Bishop of Todi, with Giovanni Battista del Tufo, Bishop Emeritus of Acerra, and Giovanni Vitelli, Bishop of Carinola, serving as co-consecrators. On 9 October 1610, he was appointed during the papacy of Pope Paul V as Apostolic Nuncio to Gratz; he resigned from the post on 16 October 1613. He served as Bishop of Troia until his death on 8 September 1622.

While bishop, he was the principal co-consecrator of Filippo Bigli, Bishop of Cagli (1610) and Ottavio Orsini, Bishop of Venafro (1621).

== External links and additional sources ==
- Cheney, David M. "Nunciature to Gratz". Catholic-Hierarchy.org. ^{[self-published]}
- Cheney, David M. "Diocese of Lucera-Troia". Catholic-Hierarchy.org. (for Chronology of Bishops) ^{[self-published]}
- Chow, Gabriel. "Diocese of Lucera-Troia (Italy)". GCatholic.org. (for Chronology of Bishops) ^{[self-published]}

Catholic Church titles
Preceded by Giovanni Battista Salvago	Apostolic Nuncio to Gratz; 1610–1613	Succeeded by Erasmo Paravicini
Preceded by Jacopo Aldobrandini	Bishop of Troia; 1607–1622	Succeeded by Giovanni Battista Roviglioni
