= List of diplomatic missions of the Holy See =

Nuncio postings outside the Vatican

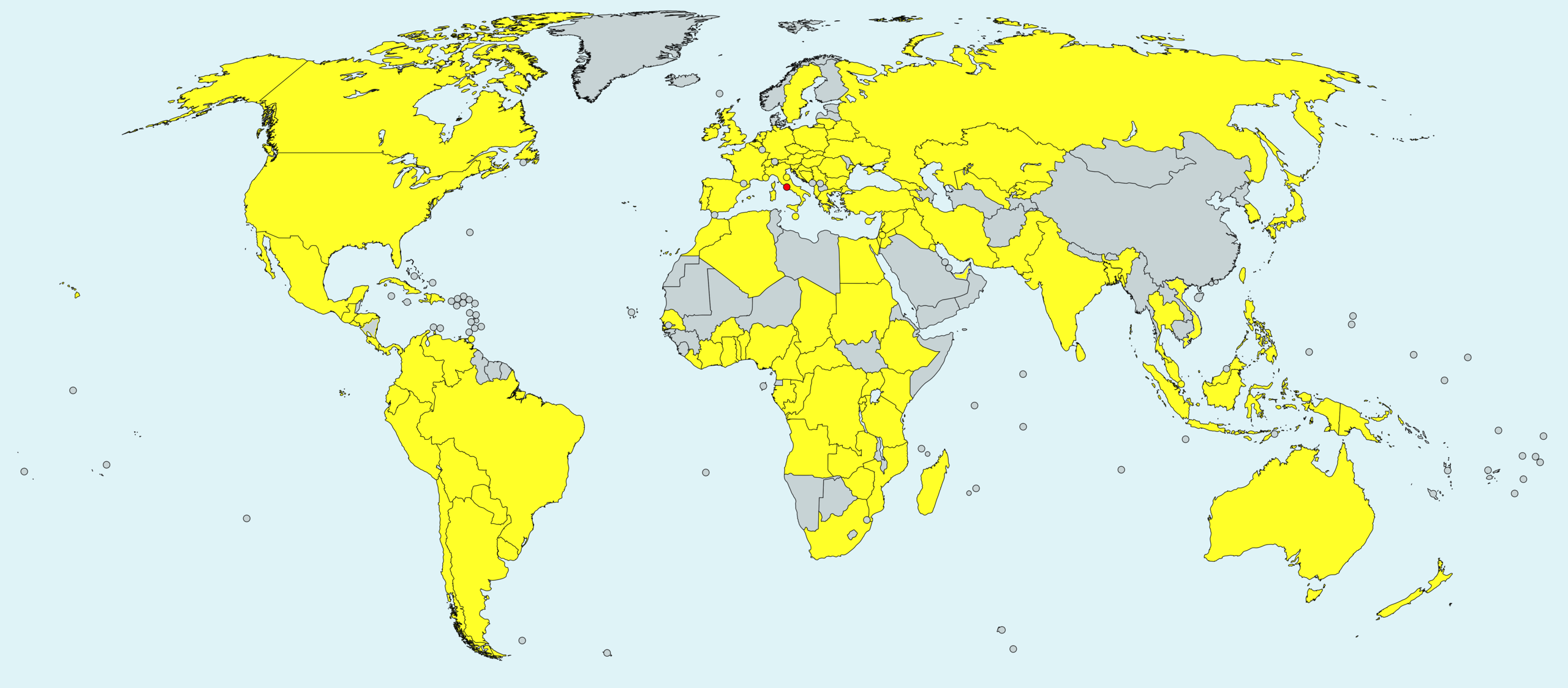
Countries hosting diplomatic missions of the Holy See

This is a list of diplomatic missions of the Holy See. Since the fifth century, long before the founding of the Vatican City State in 1929, papal envoys (now known as nuncios) have represented the Holy See to foreign potentates. Additionally, papal representatives known not as nuncios but as apostolic delegates ensure contact between the Holy See and the Catholic Church in countries that do not have diplomatic relations with the Holy See.

At present, there is one residential apostolic delegate, for Jerusalem and Palestine, as well as non-residential delegates for four countries (Brunei, Laos, Comoros, Kosovo, and Somalia) and for the territories and countries without diplomatic relations with the Holy See in three regions (the Arabian Peninsula, the Caribbean, the Pacific Ocean). For Vietnam, the 21st-century appointees of the Holy See have been given the title "pontifical representative". (Note: They are Leopoldo Girelli appointed 13 January 2011 and Marek Zakewski appointed 21 May 2018) In keeping with the "one China" policy, no representative is appointed for mainland China, and the Holy See is represented in Taipei by an apostolic nunciature, headed not by a nuncio, but only by a chargé d'affaires.

In addition to the countries mentioned above that have apostolic delegations, the following nations do not have diplomatic relations with the Holy See: Afghanistan, Bhutan, North Korea, Saudi Arabia, and Tuvalu.

== Description ==
In most respects the status of the diplomatic missions of the Holy See are identical with those of other countries, with the exception of the nomenclature: apostolic nuncios have ambassadorial rank and apostolic nunciatures are ranked as embassies. However, in most countries of central and western Europe and of central and southern America, as well as in a few countries elsewhere, the nuncio is granted precedence over other ambassadors and is dean of the diplomatic corps from the moment he presents his credentials. The Holy See, which does not issue visas, does not have consulates.

Apostolic delegates and their missions do not have diplomatic status as nuncios and nunciatures do.

In countries that allow it, the apostolic nunciature is sometimes, though rarely, located outside the capital, perhaps in towns with particularly important religious connections, such as the village of Rabat in Malta, the site of Saint Paul's grotto, and Harissa in Lebanon where Maronite, Greek Orthodox, and Melkite Greek Catholic Church authorities are located. In other countries that is not permitted: when India opened diplomatic relations with the Holy See, the apostolic delegation moved from Bangalore to the capital, New Delhi; and in Australia the mission moved from Sydney to Canberra. In Israel, the nunciature is located in Tel Aviv.

Listed below are the Holy See's apostolic nunciatures, apostolic delegations, and observer or representative missions to international governmental organizations — such as the United Nations, the Council of Europe and the Arab League.

== Africa ==
- Algeria
  - Algiers (Apostolic Nunciature) (Note: Also accredited to Tunisia.)
- Angola
  - Luanda (Apostolic Nunciature) (Note: Also accredited to São Tomé and Príncipe.)
- Benin
  - Cotonou (Apostolic Nunciature)
- Burkina Faso
  - Ouagadougou (Apostolic Nunciature) (Note: Also accredited to Niger.)
- Burundi
  - Bujumbura (Apostolic Nunciature)
- Cameroon
  - Yaoundé (Apostolic Nunciature) (Note: Also accredited to Equatorial Guinea.)
- Central African Republic
  - Bangui (Apostolic Nunciature)
- Chad
  - N'Djamena (Apostolic Nunciature)
- Congo-Brazzaville
  - Brazzaville (Apostolic Nunciature)
- Congo-Kinshasa
  - Kinshasa (Apostolic Nunciature)
- Egypt
  - Cairo (Apostolic Nunciature) (Note: Also accredited to Oman, & the Arab League.)
- Ethiopia
  - Addis Ababa (Apostolic Nunciature) (Note: Also accredited to Djibouti, Somalia, & the African Union.)
- Gabon
  - Libreville (Apostolic Nunciature)
- Ghana
  - Accra (Apostolic Nunciature)
- Guinea
  - Conakry (Apostolic Nunciature) (Note: Also accredited to Mali.)
- Ivory Coast
  - Abidjan (Apostolic Nunciature)
- Kenya
  - Nairobi (Apostolic Nunciature) (Note: Also accredited to the United Nations Environment Programme & United Nations Human Settlements Programme.)
- Liberia
  - Monrovia (Apostolic Nunciature) (Note: Also accredited to Gambia & Sierra Leone.)
- Madagascar
  - Antananarivo (Apostolic Nunciature) (Note: Also accredited to Comoros, Mauritius, & Seychelles.)
- Morocco
  - Rabat (Apostolic Nunciature)
- Mozambique
  - Maputo (Apostolic Nunciature)
- Nigeria
  - Abuja (Apostolic Nunciature) (Note: Also accredited to the Economic Community of West African States.)
- Rwanda
  - Kigali (Apostolic Nunciature)
- Senegal
  - Dakar (Apostolic Nunciature) (Note: Also accredited to Cape Verde, Guinea-Bissau, & Mauritania.)
- South Africa
  - Pretoria (Apostolic Nunciature) (Note: Also accredited to Botswana, Eswatini, Lesotho, & Namibia.)
- South Sudan
  - Juba (Apostolic Nunciature)
- Sudan
  - Khartoum (Apostolic Nunciature)
- Tanzania
  - Dar es Salaam (Apostolic Nunciature)
- Togo
  - Lomé (Apostolic Nunciature)
- Uganda
  - Kampala (Apostolic Nunciature)
- Zambia
  - Lusaka (Apostolic Nunciature)
- Zimbabwe
  - Harare (Apostolic Nunciature)

== Americas ==
- Argentina
  - Buenos Aires (Apostolic Nunciature)
- Bolivia
  - La Paz (Apostolic Nunciature)
- Brazil
  - Brasília (Apostolic Nunciature)
- Canada
  - Ottawa (Apostolic Nunciature)
- Chile
  - Santiago de Chile (Apostolic Nunciature)
- Colombia
  - Bogotá (Apostolic Nunciature)
- Costa Rica
  - San José (Apostolic Nunciature)
- Cuba
  - Havana (Apostolic Nunciature)
- Dominican Republic
  - Santo Domingo (Apostolic Nunciature)
- Ecuador
  - Quito (Apostolic Nunciature)
- El Salvador
  - San Salvador (Apostolic Nunciature)
- Guatemala
  - Guatemala City (Apostolic Nunciature)
- Haiti
  - Port-au-Prince (Apostolic Nunciature)
- Honduras
  - Tegucigalpa (Apostolic Nunciature)
- Mexico
  - Mexico City (Apostolic Nunciature)
- Panama
  - Panama City (Apostolic Nunciature)
- Paraguay
  - Asunción (Apostolic Nunciature)
- Peru
  - Lima (Apostolic Nunciature)
- Trinidad and Tobago
  - Port of Spain (Apostolic Nunciature) (Note: Also accredited to Antigua and Barbuda, Bahamas, Barbados, Belize, Dominica, Grenada, Guyana, Jamaica, Saint Kitts and Nevis, Saint Lucia, Saint Vincent and the Grenadines, Suriname, Caribbean Community.)
- United States
  - Washington, D.C. (Apostolic Nunciature)
- Uruguay
  - Montevideo (Apostolic Nunciature)
- Venezuela
  - Caracas (Apostolic Nunciature)

== Asia ==
- Armenia
  - Yerevan (Apostolic Nunciature)
- Bangladesh
  - Dhaka (Apostolic Nunciature)
- Republic of China (Taiwan)
  - Taipei (Apostolic Nunciature)
- Georgia
  - Tbilisi (Apostolic Nunciature)
- India
  - New Delhi (Apostolic Nunciature) (Note: Also accredited to Nepal.)
- Indonesia
  - Jakarta (Apostolic Nunciature) (Note: Also accredited to the Association of Southeast Asian Nations.)
- Iran
  - Tehran (Apostolic Nunciature)
- Iraq
  - Baghdad (Apostolic Nunciature)
- Israel
  - Tel Aviv (Apostolic Nunciature)
- Japan
  - Tokyo (Apostolic Nunciature)
- Jordan
  - Amman (Apostolic Nunciature)
- Kazakhstan
  - Astana (Apostolic Nunciature) (Note: Also accredited to Kyrgyzstan & Tajikistan.)
- Kuwait
  - Kuwait City (Apostolic Nunciature) (Note: Also accredited to Bahrain & Qatar.)
- Lebanon
  - Harissa (Apostolic Nunciature)
- Malaysia
  - Kuala Lumpur (Apostolic Nunciature)
- Pakistan
  - Islamabad (Apostolic Nunciature)
- Palestine
  - East Jerusalem (Apostolic Delegation)
- Philippines
  - Manila (Apostolic Nunciature)
- Singapore
  - Singapore (Apostolic Nunciature)
- South Korea
  - Seoul (Apostolic Nunciature) (Note: Also accredited to Mongolia.)
- Sri Lanka
  - Colombo (Apostolic Nunciature)
- Syria
  - Damascus (Apostolic Nunciature)
- Thailand
  - Bangkok (Apostolic Nunciature) (Note: Also accredited to Brunei, Cambodia, & Laos.)
- Timor-Leste
  - Dili (Apostolic Nunciature)
- Turkey
  - Ankara (Apostolic Nunciature) (Note: Also accredited to Azerbaijan & Turkmenistan.)
- United Arab Emirates
  - Abu Dhabi (Apostolic Nunciature)
- Uzbekistan
  - Tashkent (Apostolic Nunciature)
- Vietnam
  - Hanoi (Papal Resident Representative Office)

== Europe ==
- Albania
  - Tirana (Apostolic Nunciature)
- Austria
  - Vienna (Apostolic Nunciature)
- Belarus
  - Minsk (Apostolic Nunciature)
- Belgium
  - Brussels (Apostolic Nunciature) (Note: Also accredited to Luxembourg.)
- Bosnia and Herzegovina
  - Sarajevo (Apostolic Nunciature) (Note: Also accredited to Montenegro.)
- Bulgaria
  - Sofia (Apostolic Nunciature) (Note: Also accredited to North Macedonia.)
- Croatia
  - Zagreb (Apostolic Nunciature)
- Cyprus
  - Nicosia (Apostolic Nunciature)
- Czechia
  - Prague (Apostolic Nunciature) (Note: Originally the Apostolic Nunciature to Czechoslovakia, it was renamed as the Apostolic Nunciature to the Czech Republic after the country's division into the Czech and Slovak republics in 1992. A separate mission to Slovakia was created in 1993.)
- France
  - Paris (Apostolic Nunciature)
- Germany
  - Berlin (Apostolic Nunciature)
- Greece
  - Athens (Apostolic Nunciature)
- Hungary
  - Budapest (Apostolic Nunciature)
- Ireland (Note: The Apostolic Nunciature's jurisdiction covers both the independent Irish republic and Northern Ireland, which is a constituent country of the United Kingdom.)
  - Dublin (Apostolic Nunciature)
- Italy
  - Rome (Apostolic Nunciature) (Note: Also accredited to San Marino.)
- Lithuania
  - Vilnius (Apostolic Nunciature) (Note: Also accredited to Estonia & Latvia.)
- Malta
  - Rabat (Apostolic Nunciature) (Note: Also accredited to Libya.)
- Netherlands
  - The Hague (Apostolic Nunciature) (Note: Also accredited to the Organisation for the Prohibition of Chemical Weapons.)
- Poland
  - Warsaw (Apostolic Nunciature)
- Portugal
  - Lisbon (Apostolic Nunciature)
- Romania
  - Bucharest (Apostolic Nunciature) (Note: Also accredited to Moldova.)
- Russia
  - Moscow (Apostolic Nunciature)
- Serbia
  - Belgrade (Apostolic Nunciature) (Note: Established in 1920 as the Apostolic Nunciature to Serbia (Yugoslavia). After numerous renamings during the Interwar Period, the mission was renamed the Apostolic Nunciature to Yugoslavia in 1929. This lasted even after the dissolution of Yugoslavia into successor states in 1992. As each successor state subsequently conducted diplomatic relations with the Holy See, the mission's jurisdiction shrank to cover only the State Union of Serbia and Montenegro in 2003, leading to its renaming as the Apostolic Nunciature to Serbia and Montenegro. In 2006, following the breakup of said union, the mission was renamed for the final time as the Apostolic Nunciature to Serbia.)
- Slovakia
  - Bratislava (Apostolic Nunciature) (Note: Established in 1993, after the Dissolution of Czechoslovakia, which led to the renaming of the resident mission in Prague into the Apostolic Nunciature to the Czech Republic.)
- Slovenia
  - Ljubljana (Apostolic Nunciature) (Note: Also accredited to Kosovo.)
- Spain
  - Madrid (Apostolic Nunciature) (Note: Also accredited to Andorra.)
- Sweden
  - Stockholm (Apostolic Nunciature) (Note: Also accredited to Denmark, Finland, Iceland, & Norway.)
- Switzerland
  - Bern (Apostolic Nunciature) (Note: Also accredited to Liechtenstein & Monaco.)
- Ukraine
  - Kyiv (Apostolic Nunciature)
- United Kingdom (Note: Even though other diplomatic missions are appointed to the United Kingdom, that of the Holy See is appointed to Great Britain. The Apostolic Nunciature's jurisdiction covers only 3 of the 4 constituent countries of the United Kingdom: England, Scotland, and Wales; on the other hand, Northern Ireland, is under the jurisdiction of the Apostolic Nunciature to Ireland.)
  - London (Apostolic Nunciature)

== Oceania ==
- Australia
  - Canberra (Apostolic Nunciature)
- New Zealand
  - Wellington (Apostolic Nunciature) (Note: Also accredited to Cook Islands, Fiji, Kiribati, Marshall Islands, Micronesia, Nauru, Niue, Palau, Samoa, Tonga, & Vanuatu.)
- Papua New Guinea
  - Port Moresby (Apostolic Nunciature) (Note: Also accredited to Solomon Islands.)

== Multilateral organisations ==
- Council of Europe
  - Strasbourg (Permanent Observer)
- European Union
  - Brussels (Apostolic Nunciature)
- Food and Agriculture Organization
  - Rome (Permanent Observer) (Note: Also accredited to the International Fund for Agricultural Development & World Food Programme.)
- International Institute for the Unification of Private Law
  - Rome (Permanent Observer)
- United Nations
  - New York City (Permanent Observer)
  - Geneva (Permanent Observer) (Note: Also accredited to the International Organization for Migration & World Trade Organization.)
  - Vienna (Permanent Observer) (Note: Also accredited to the CTBTO Preparatory Commission, International Atomic Energy Agency, Organization for Security and Co-operation in Europe, United Nations Industrial Development Organization.)
- UNESCO
  - Paris (Permanent Observer)
- Madrid to UNWTO
- International Committee of Military Medicine (ICMM)

== Gallery ==
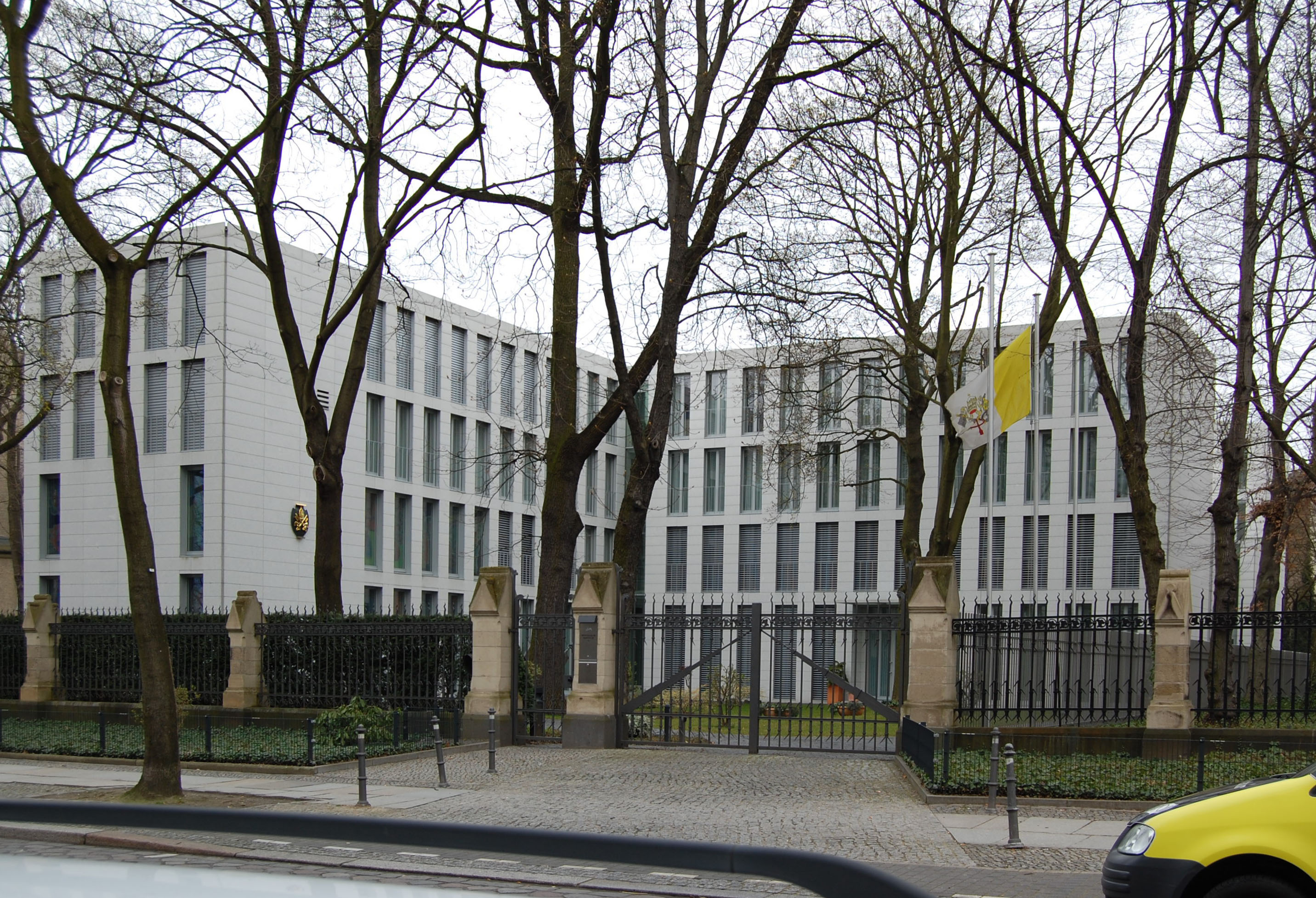
Apostolic Nunciature in Berlin

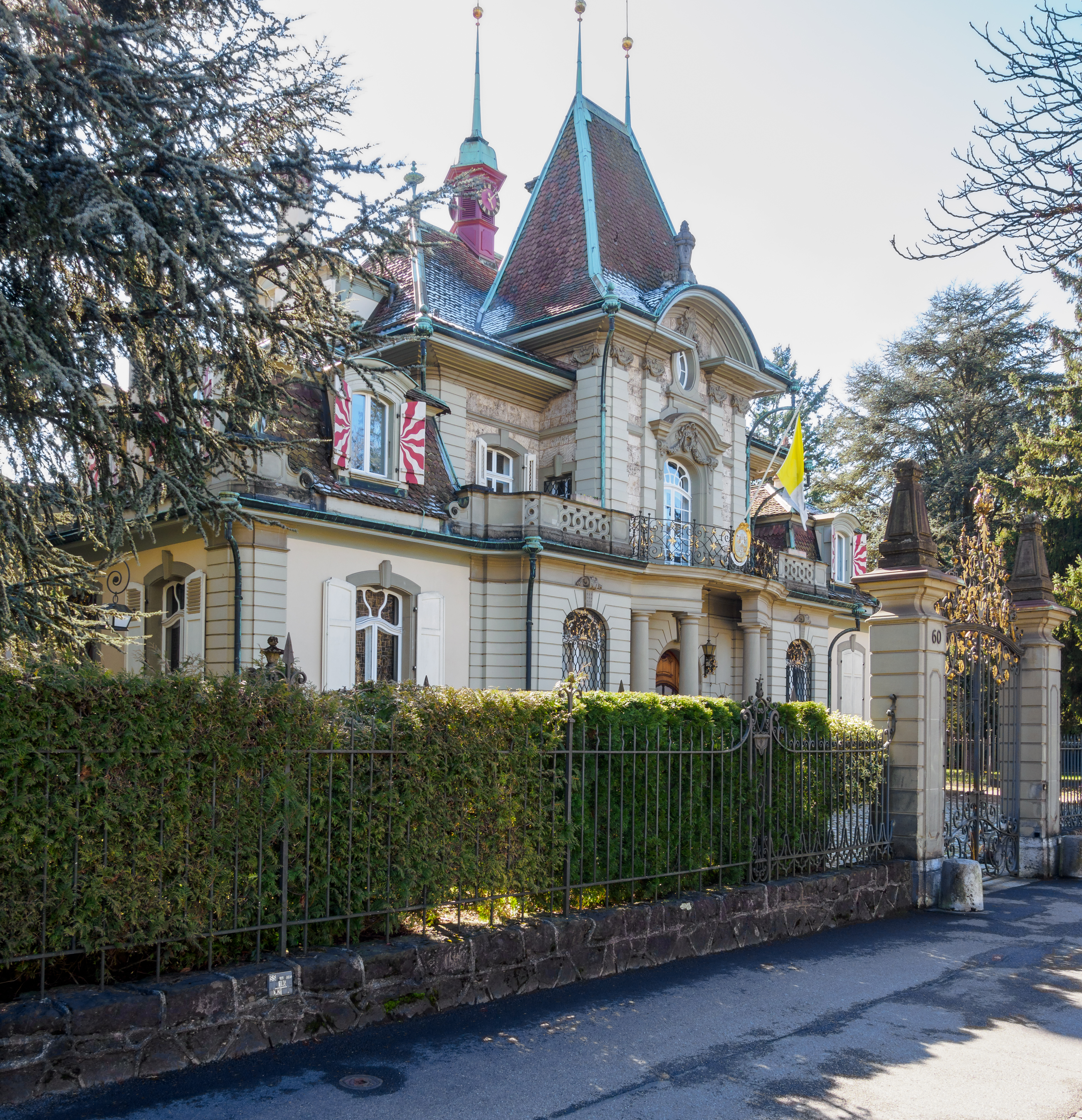
Apostolic Nunciature in Bern

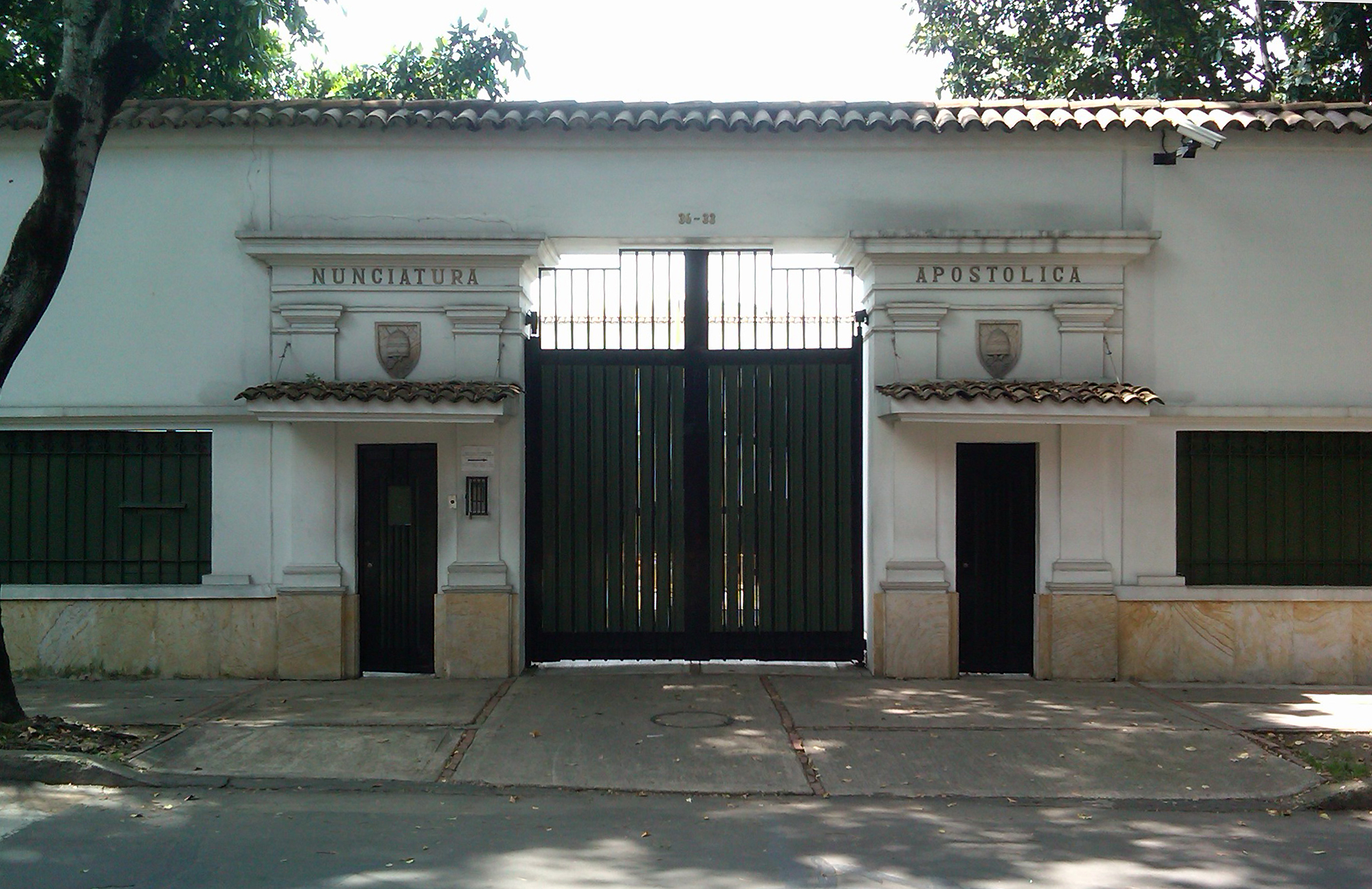
Apostolic Nunciature in Bogotá

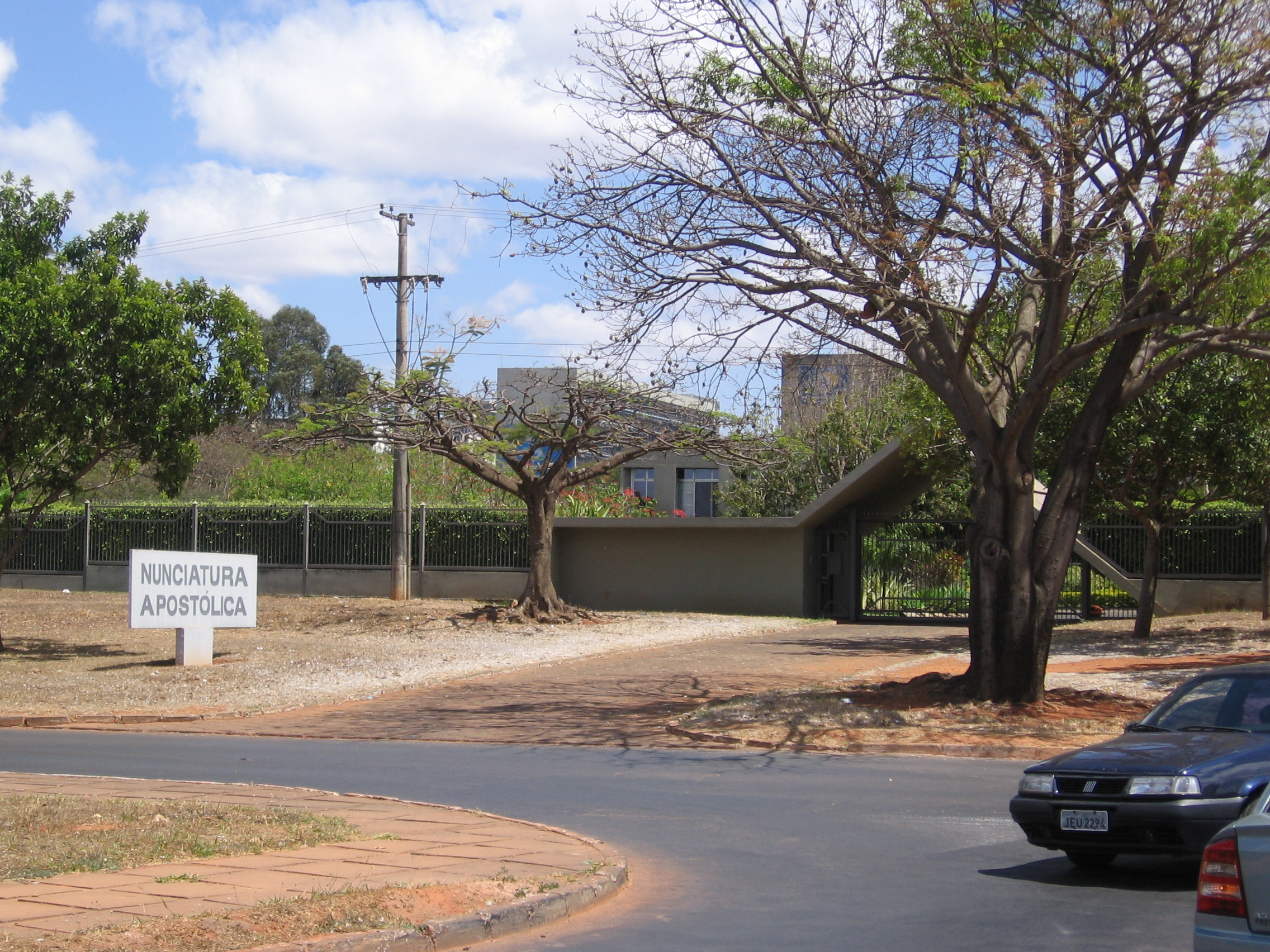
Apostolic Nunciature in Brasília

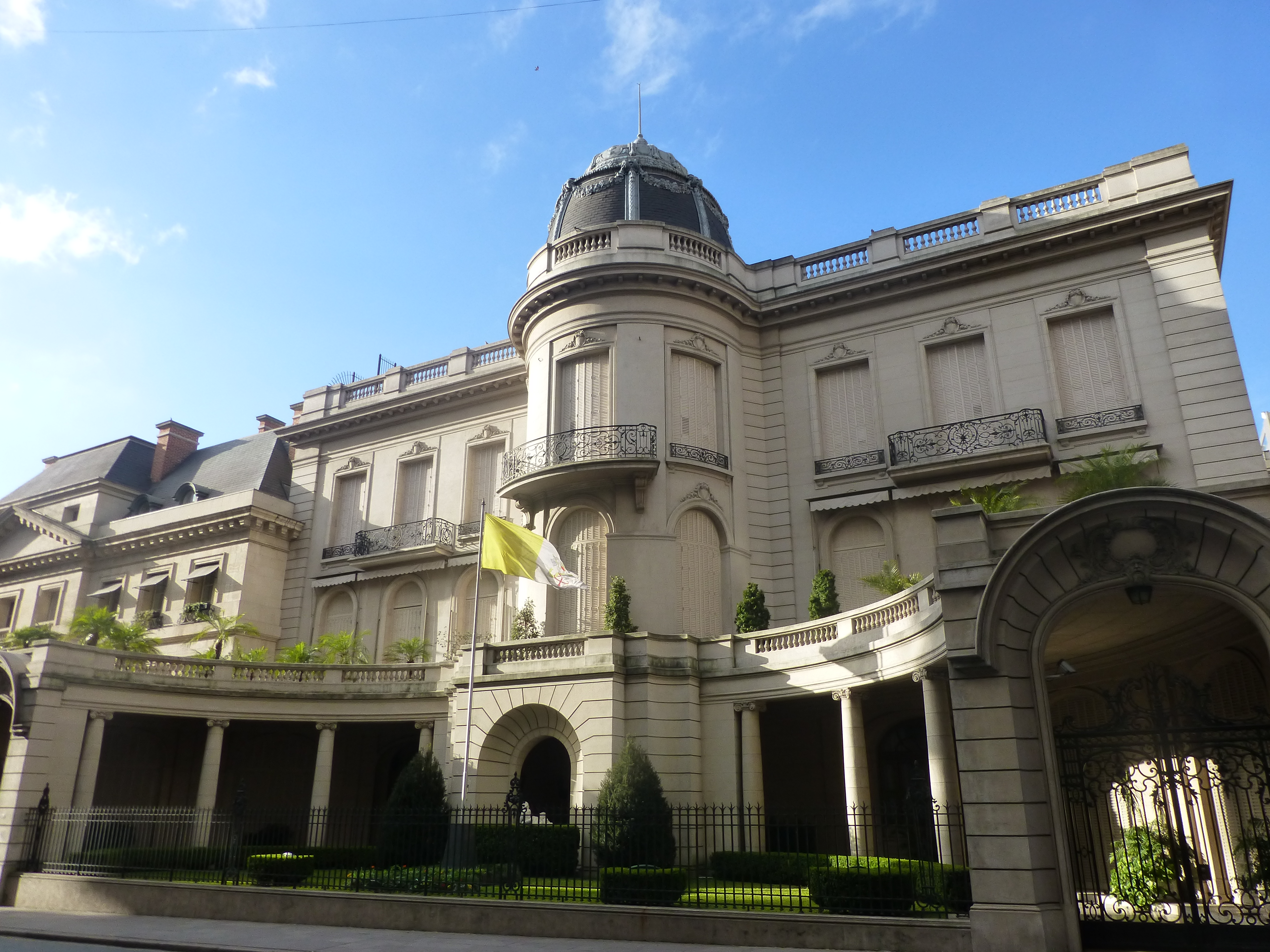
Apostolic Nunciature in Buenos Aires

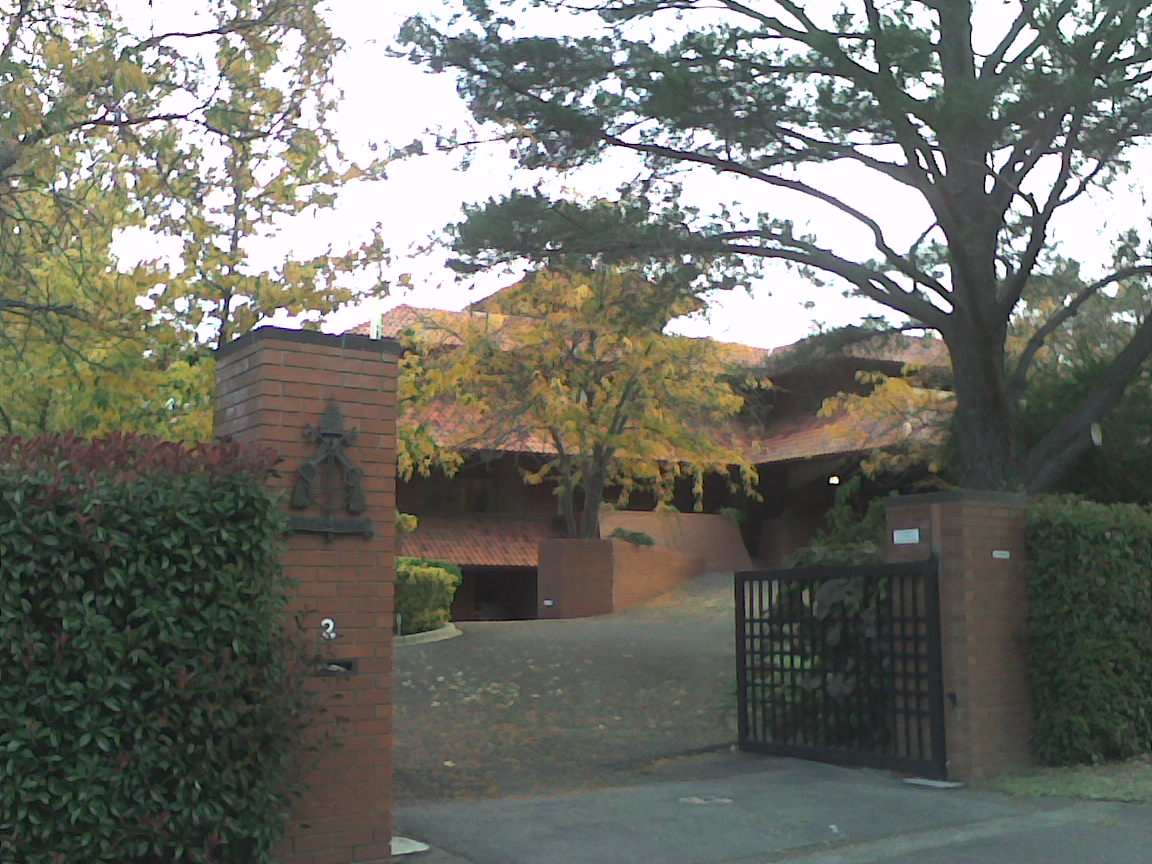
Apostolic Nunciature in Canberra

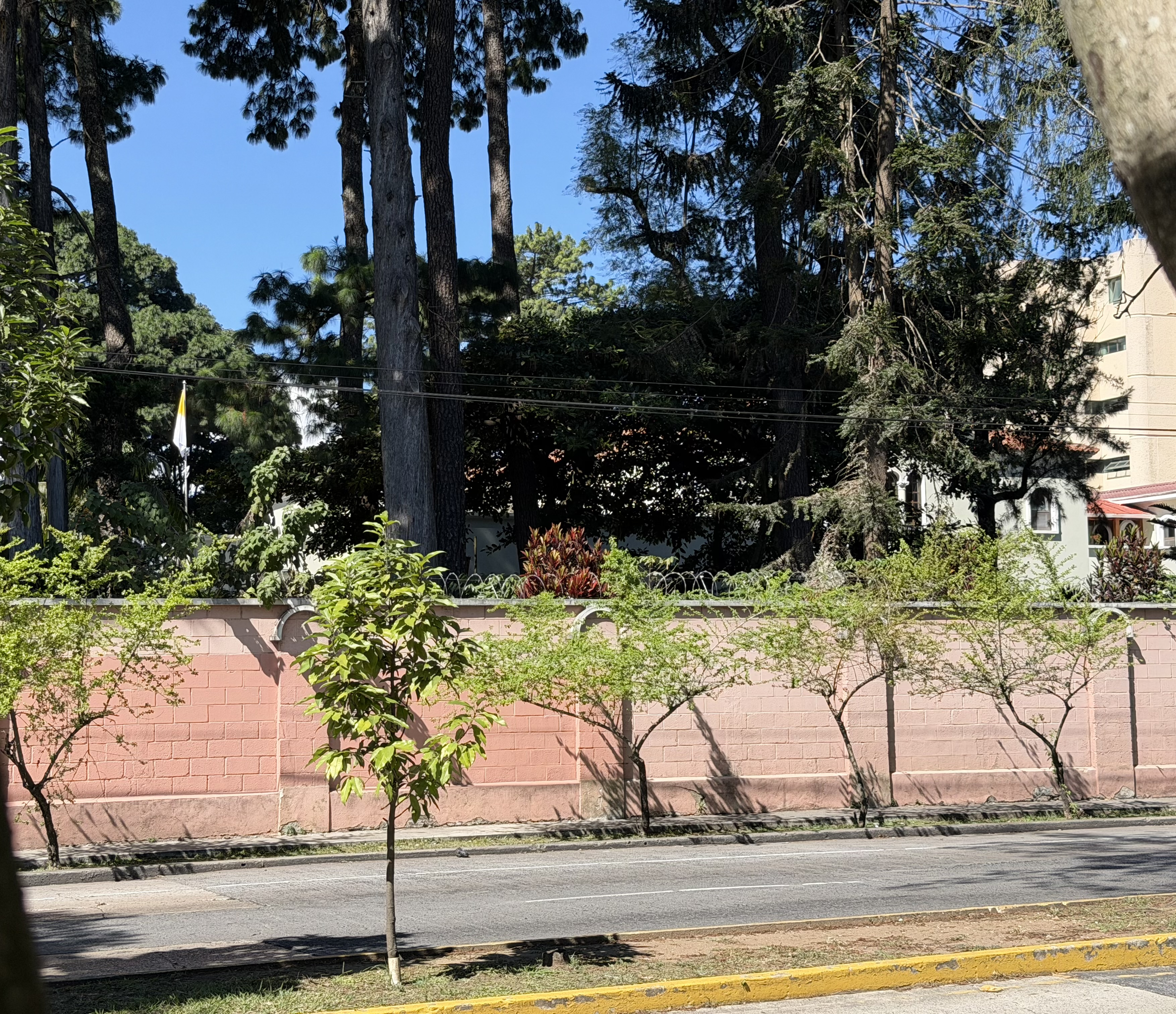
Apostolic Nunciature in Guatemala City

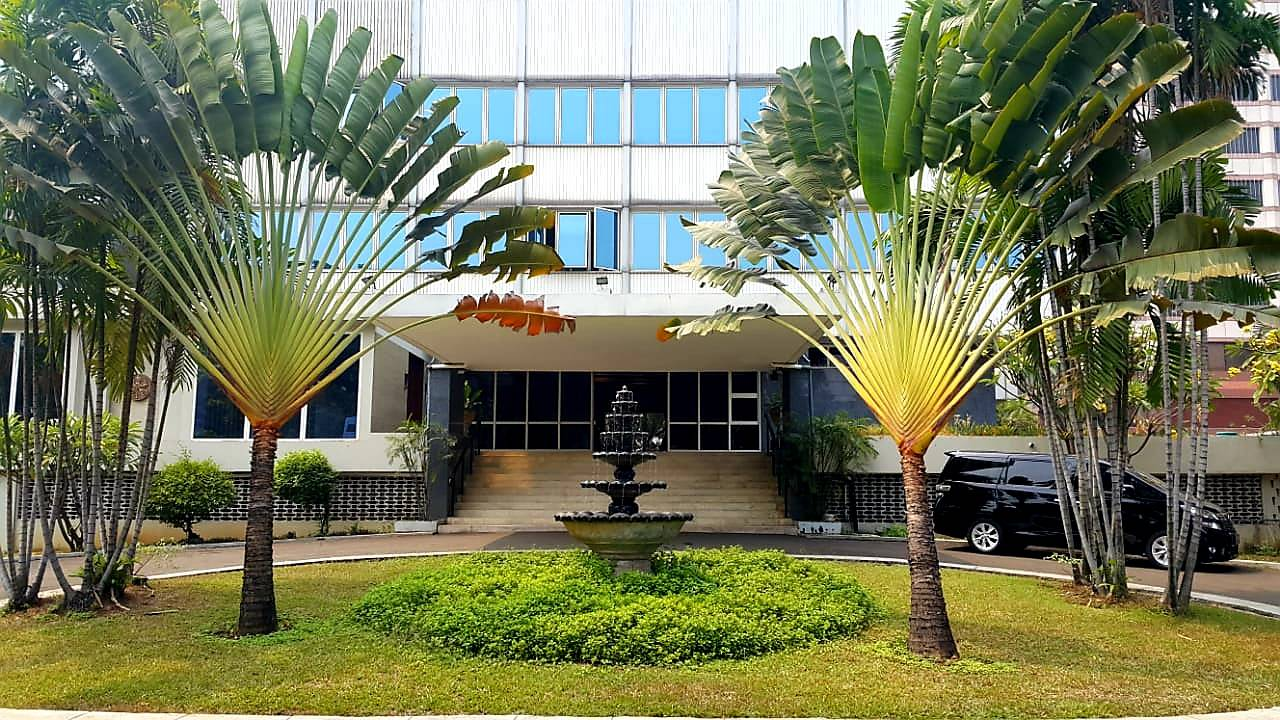
Apostolic Nunciature in Jakarta

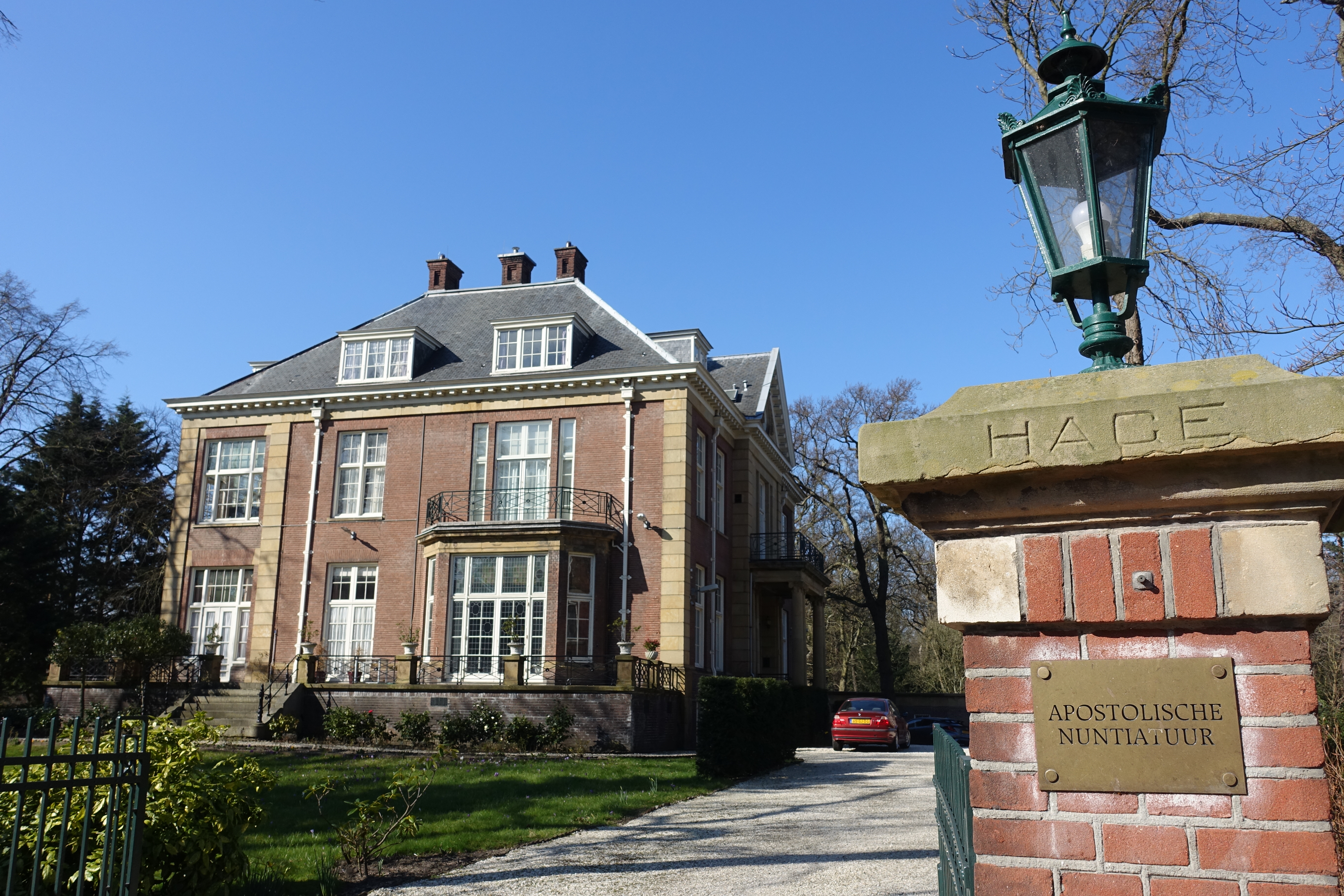
Apostolic Nunciature in The Hague

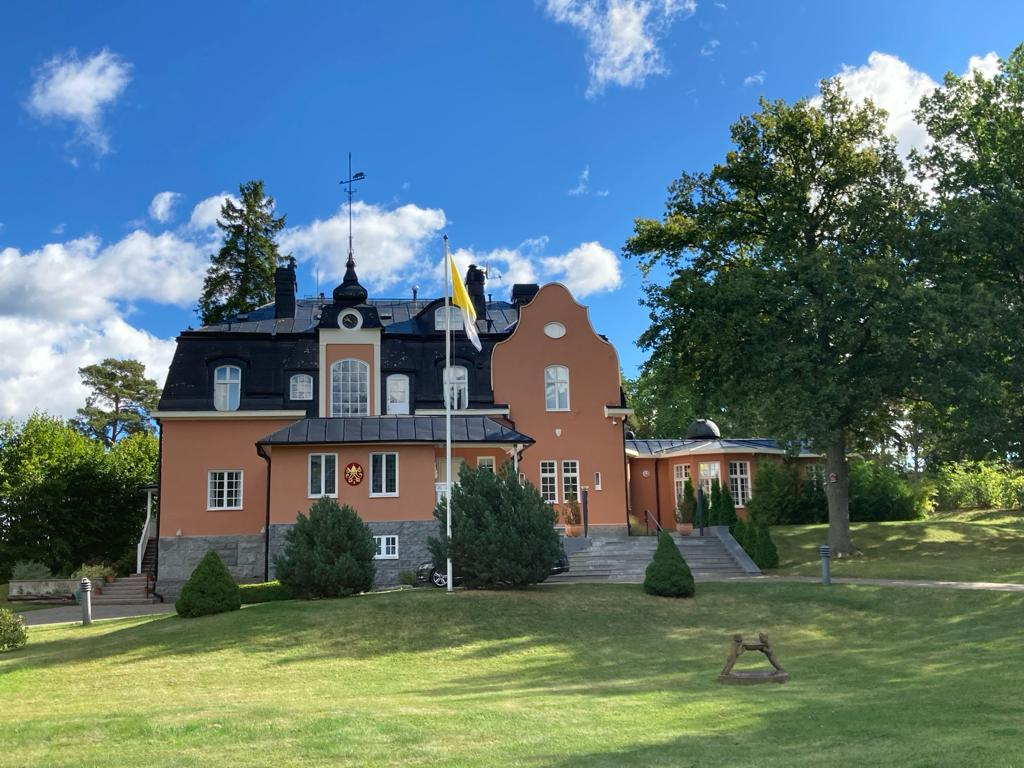
Apostolic Nunciature in Stockholm

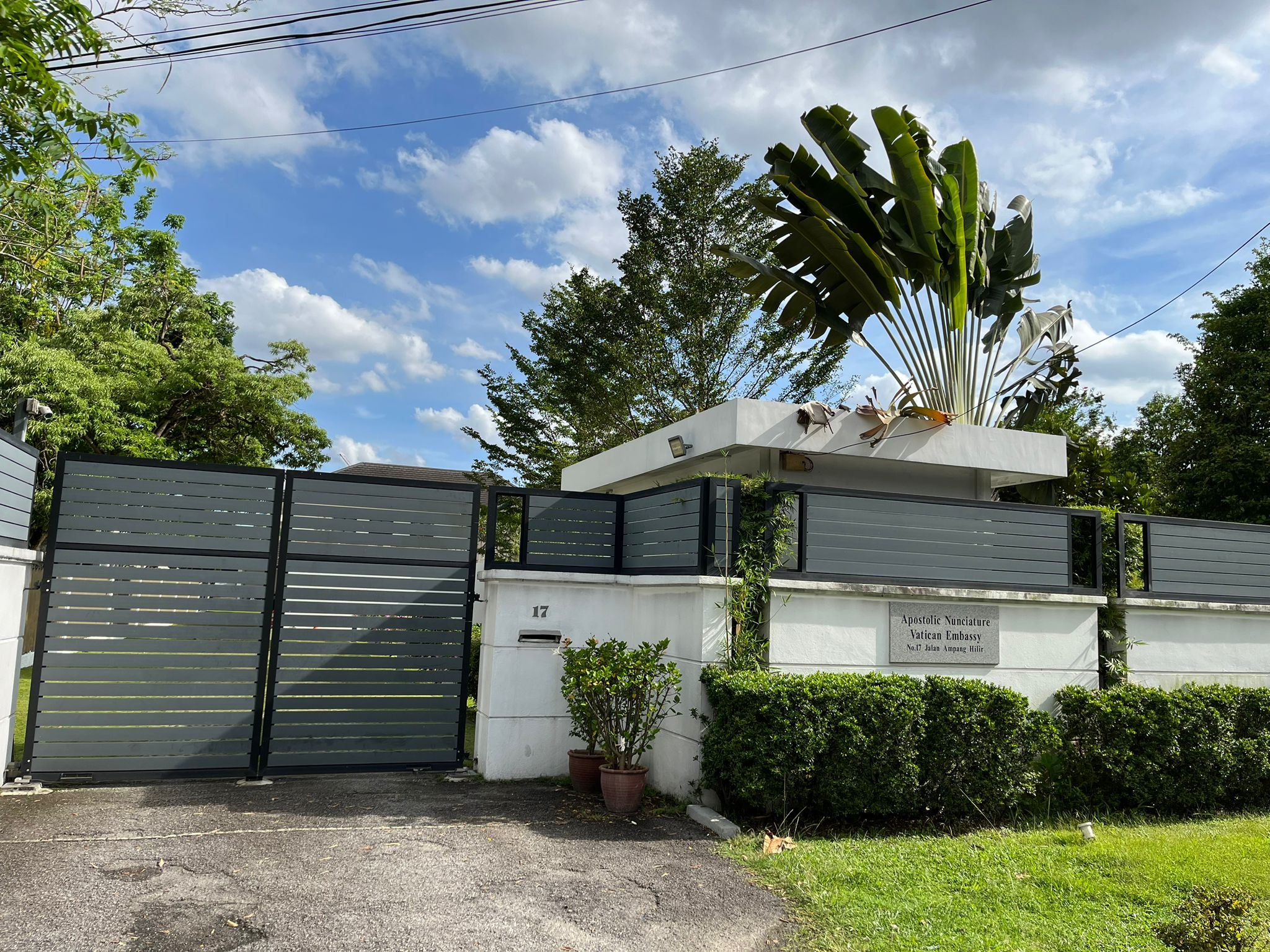
Apostolic Nunciature in Kuala Lumpur

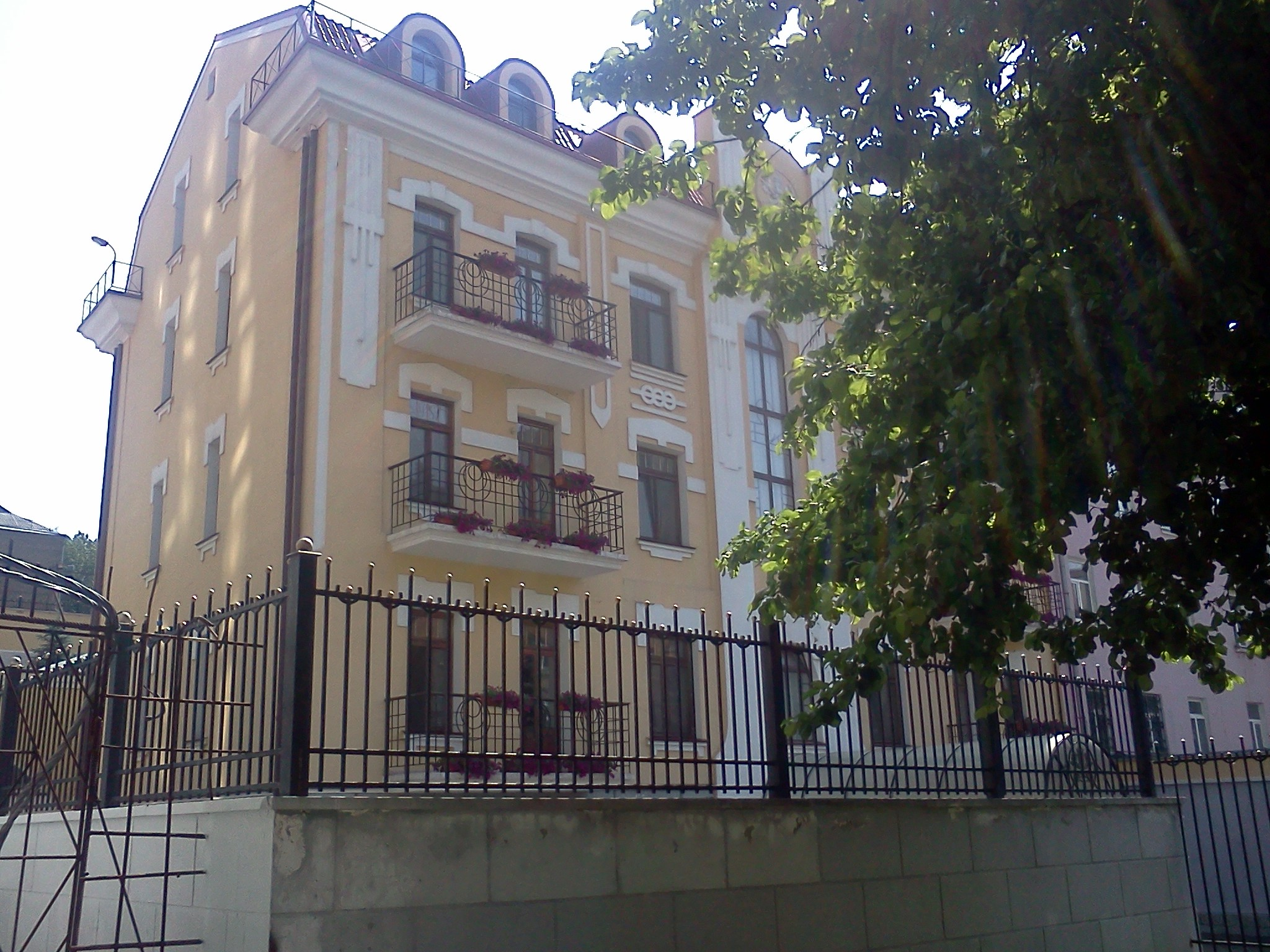
Apostolic Nunciature in Kyiv

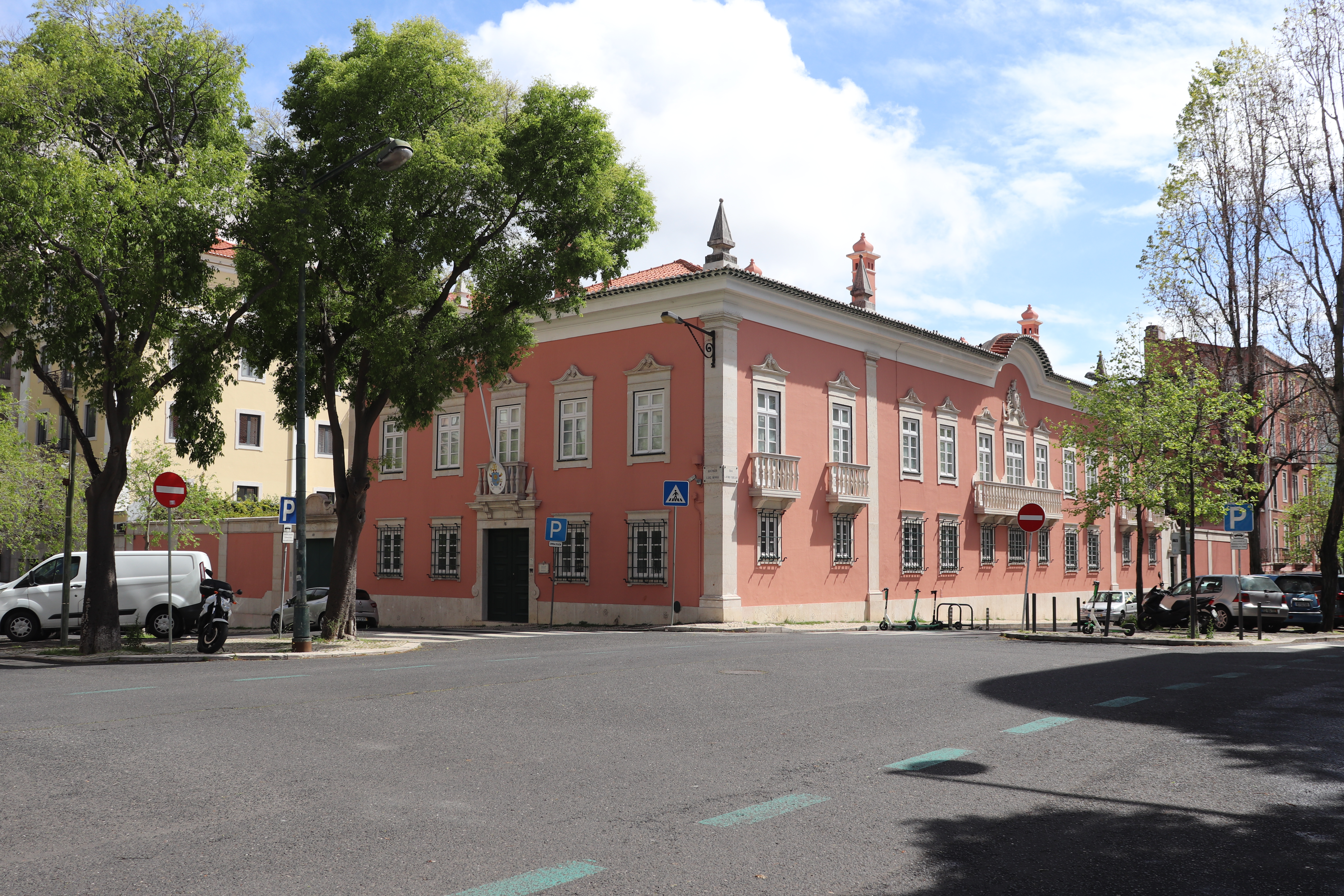
Apostolic Nunciature in Lisbon

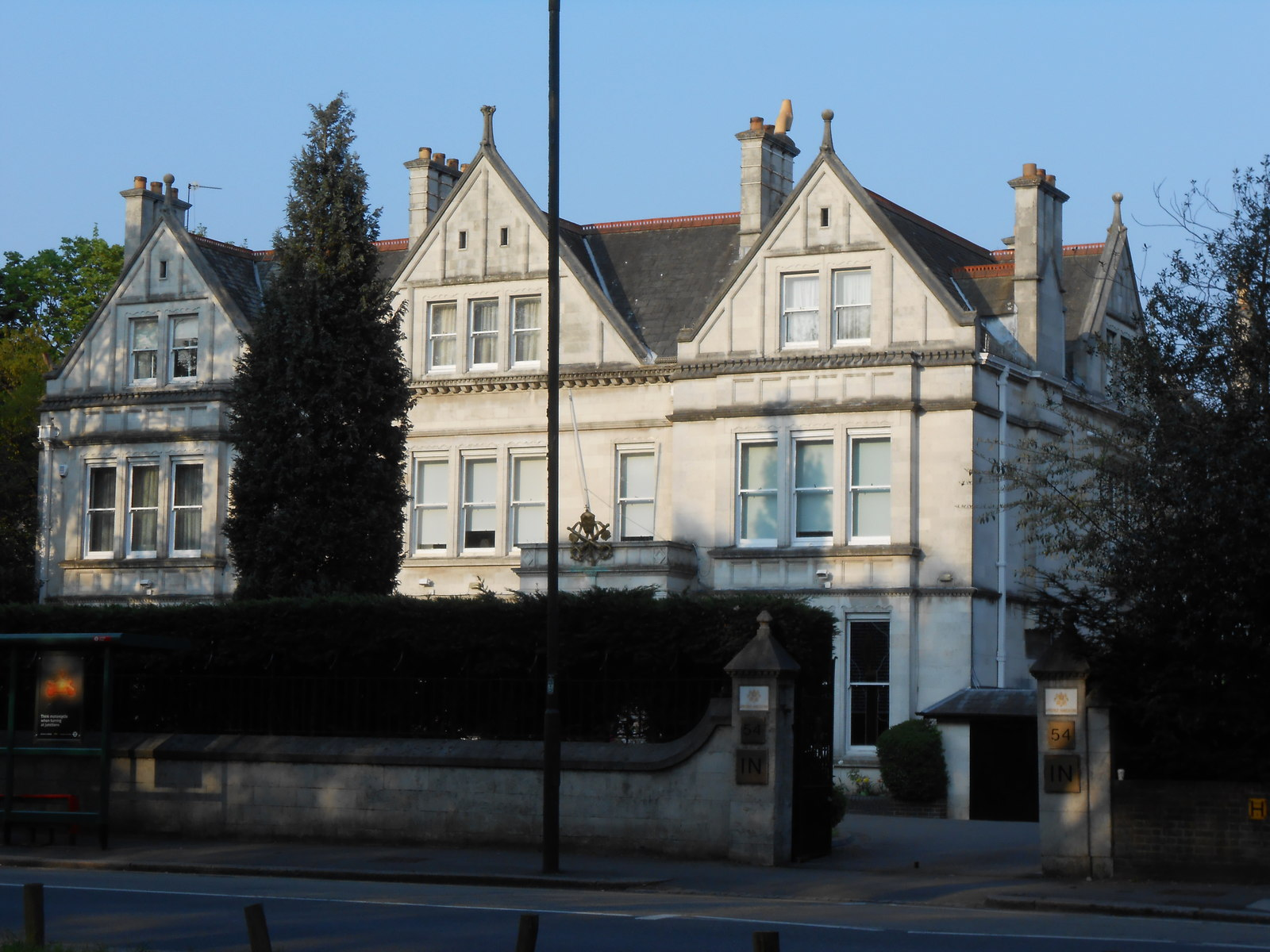
Apostolic Nunciature in London

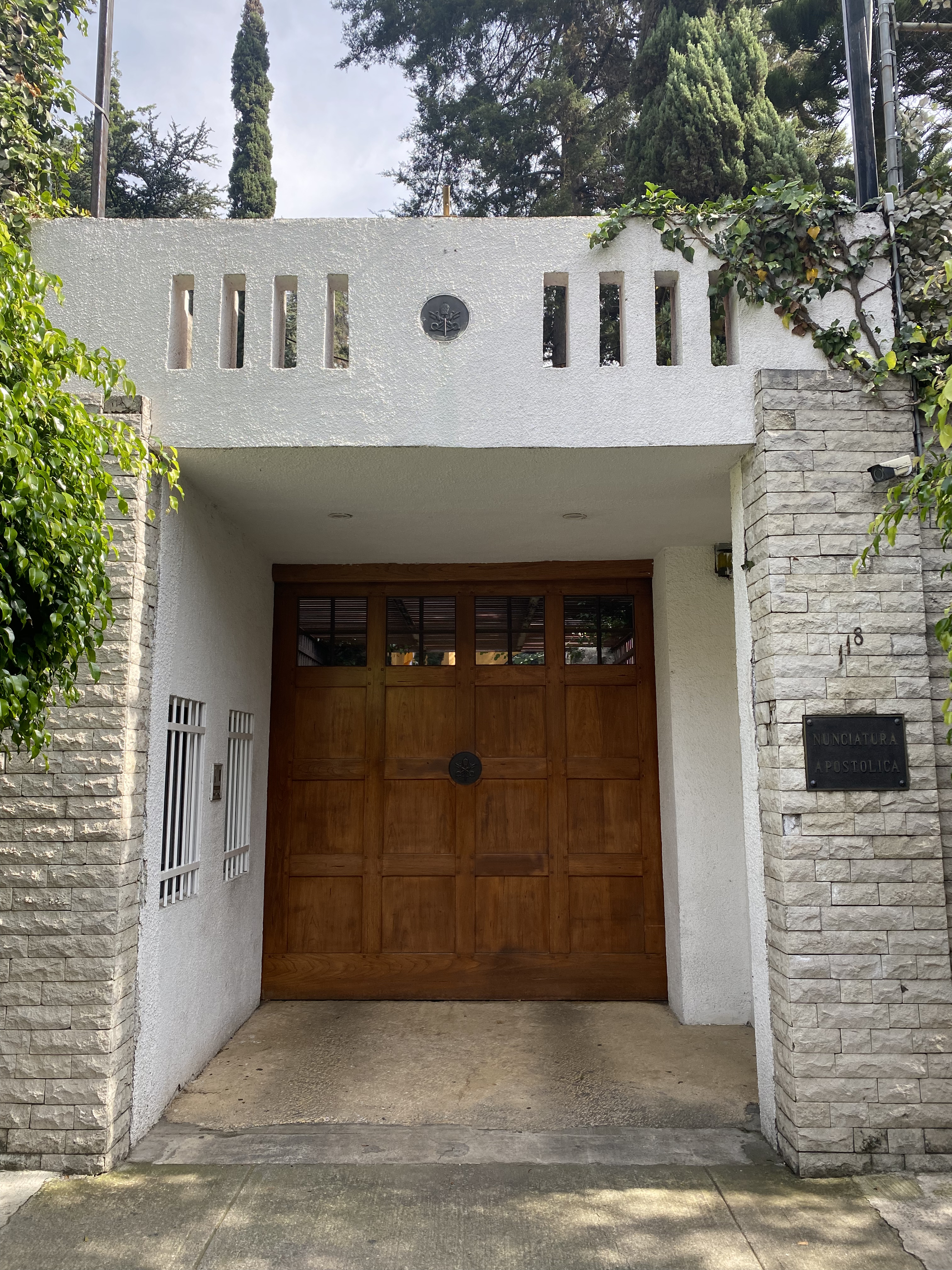
Apostolic Nunciature in Mexico City

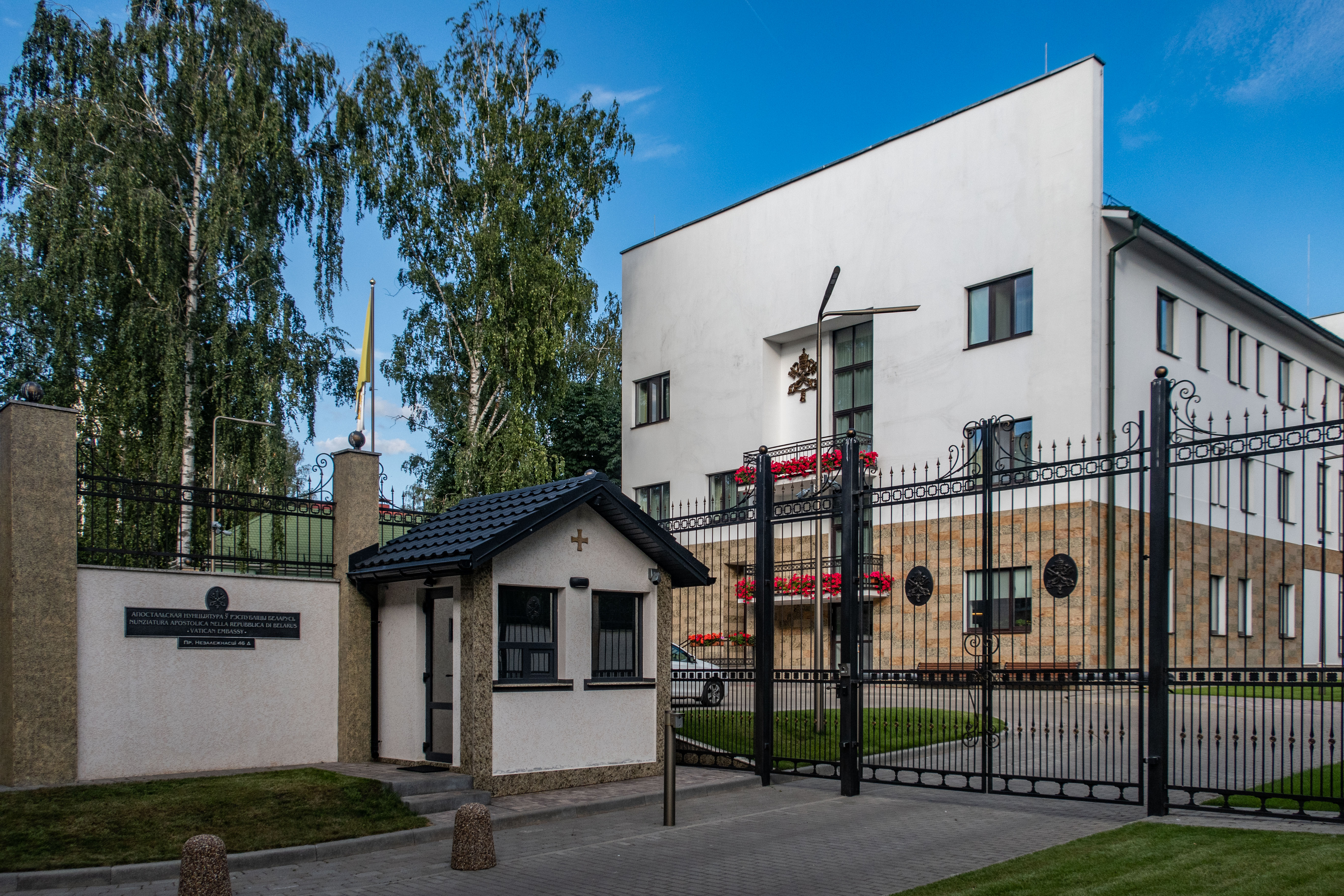
Apostolic Nunciature in Minsk

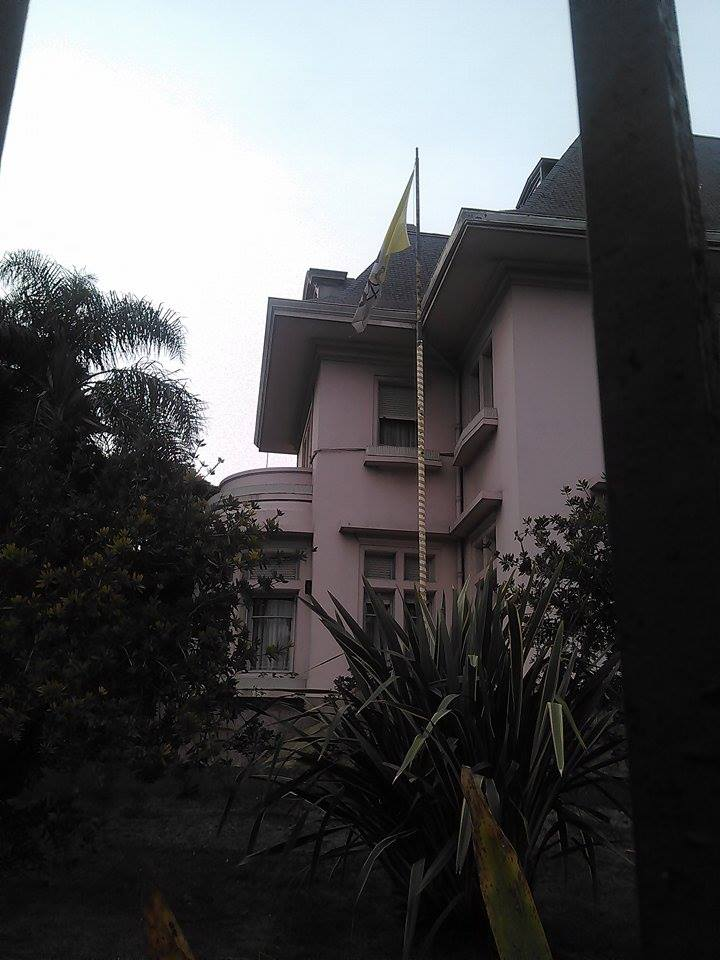
Apostolic Nunciature in Montevideo

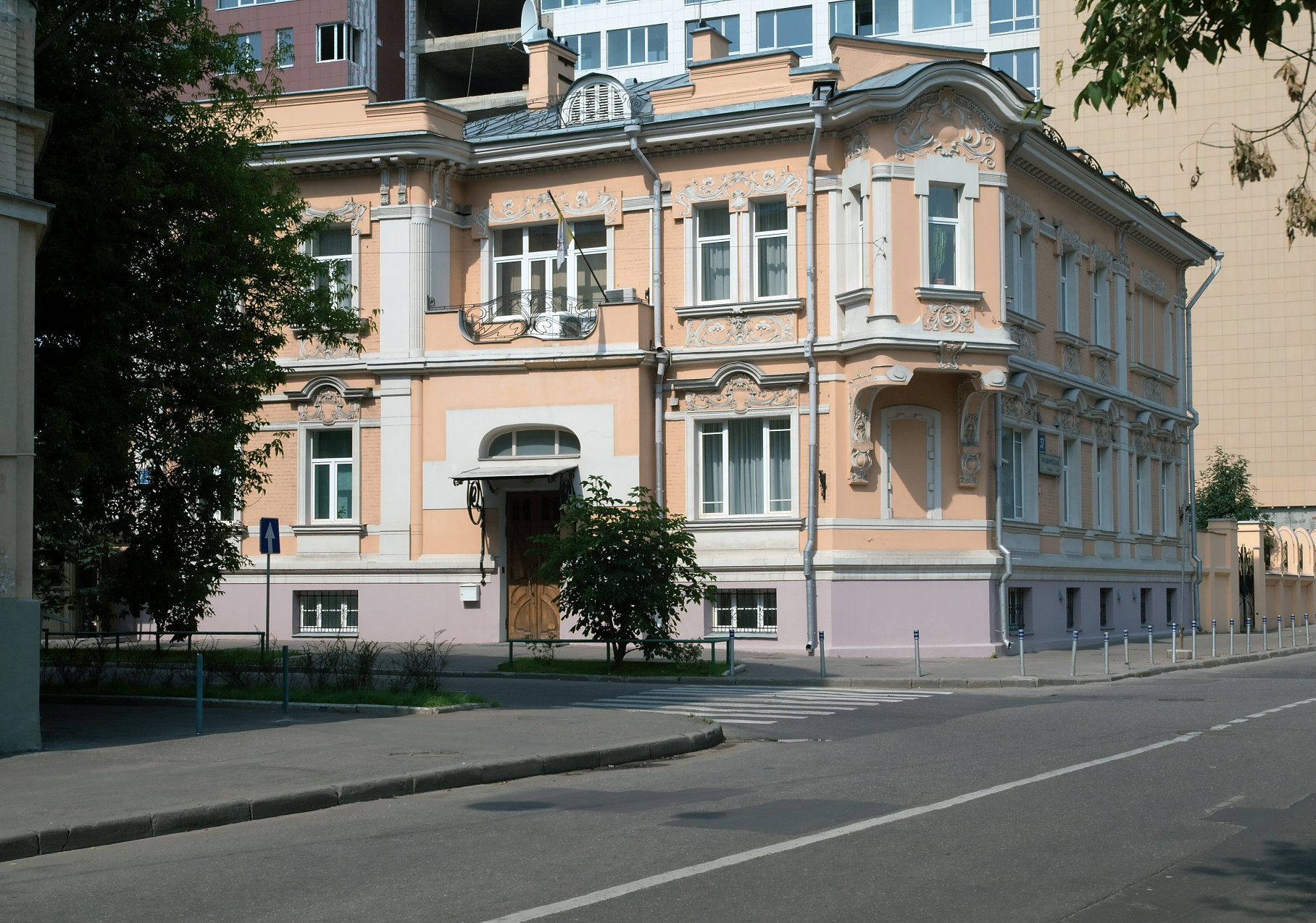
Apostolic Nunciature in Moscow

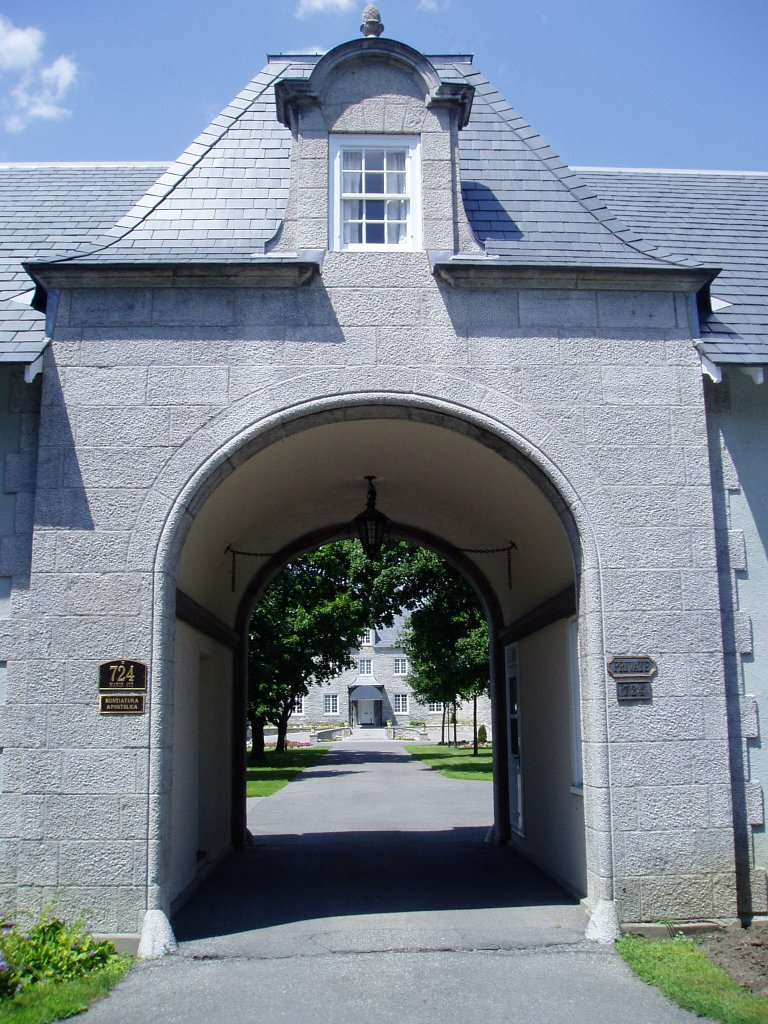
Apostolic Nunciature in Ottawa

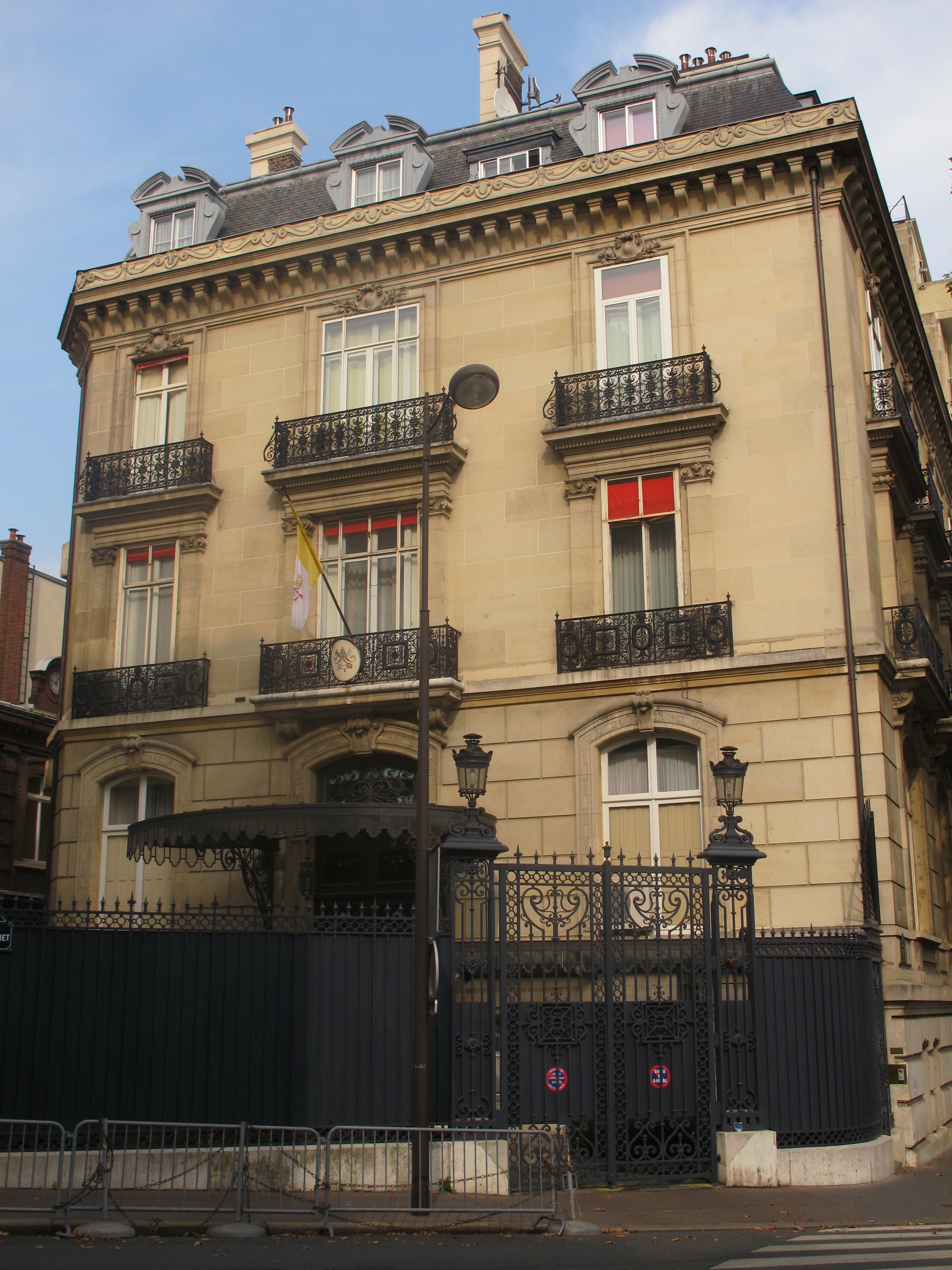
Apostolic Nunciature in Paris

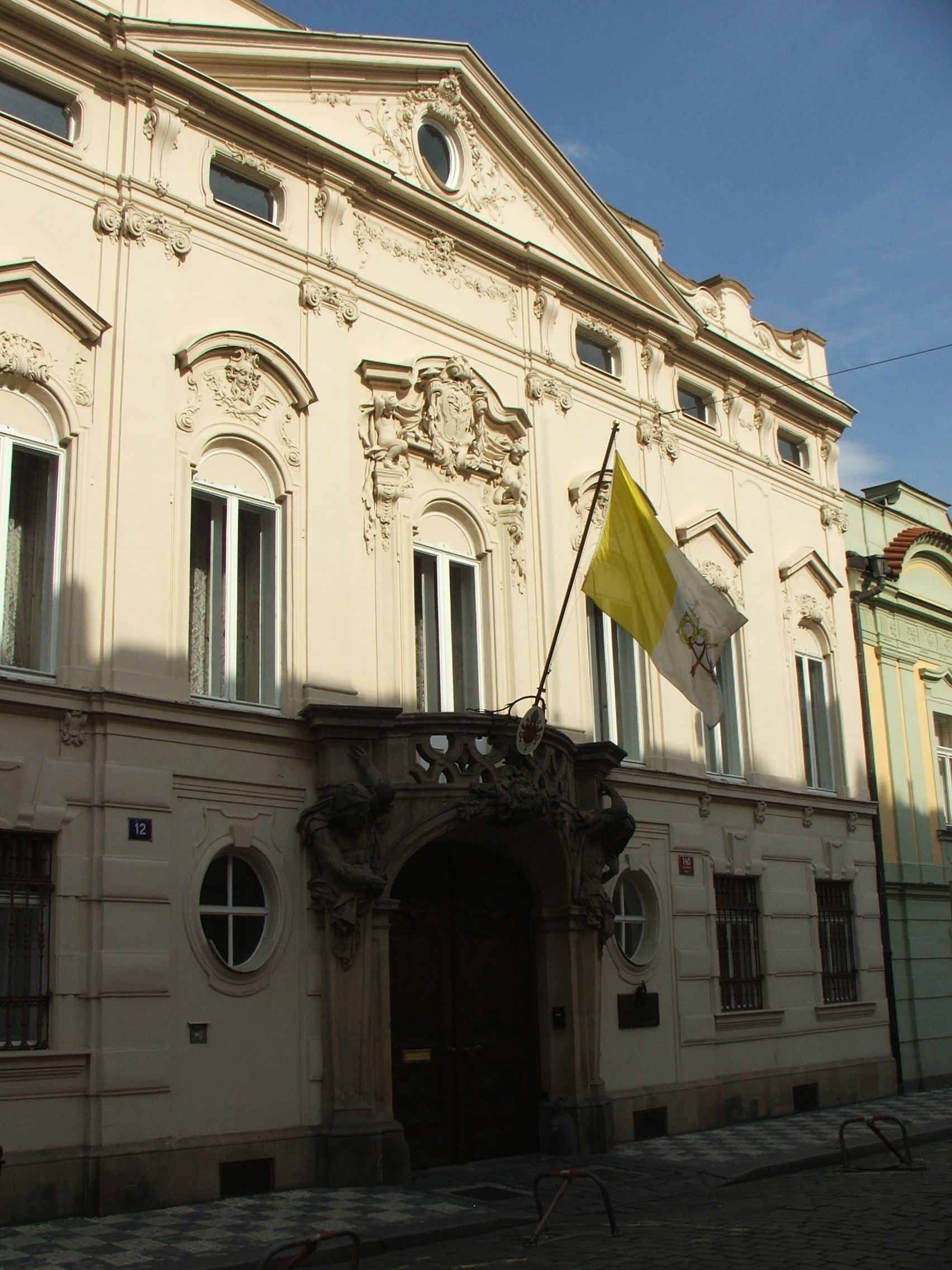
Apostolic Nunciature in Prague

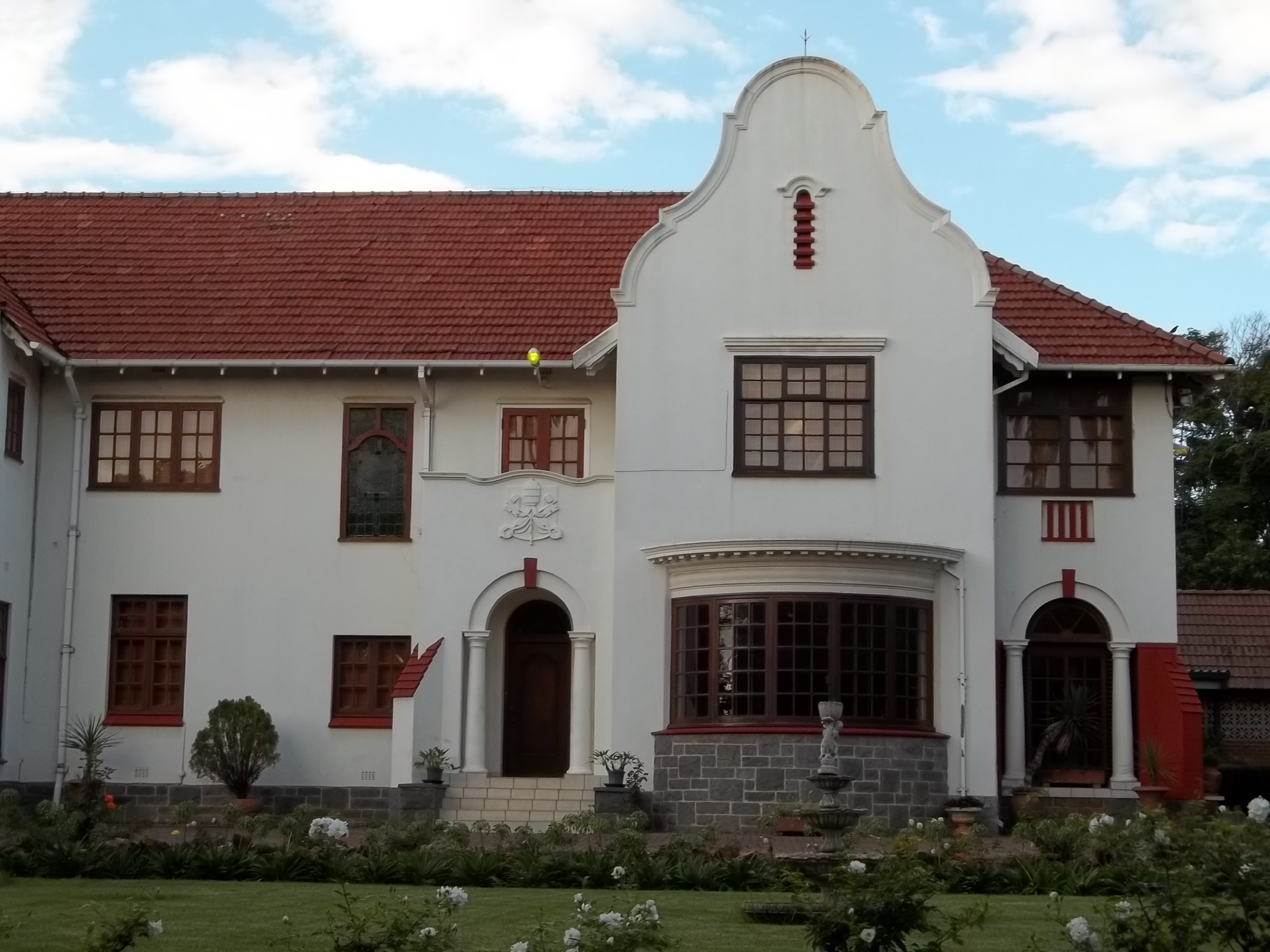
Apostolic Nunciature in Pretoria

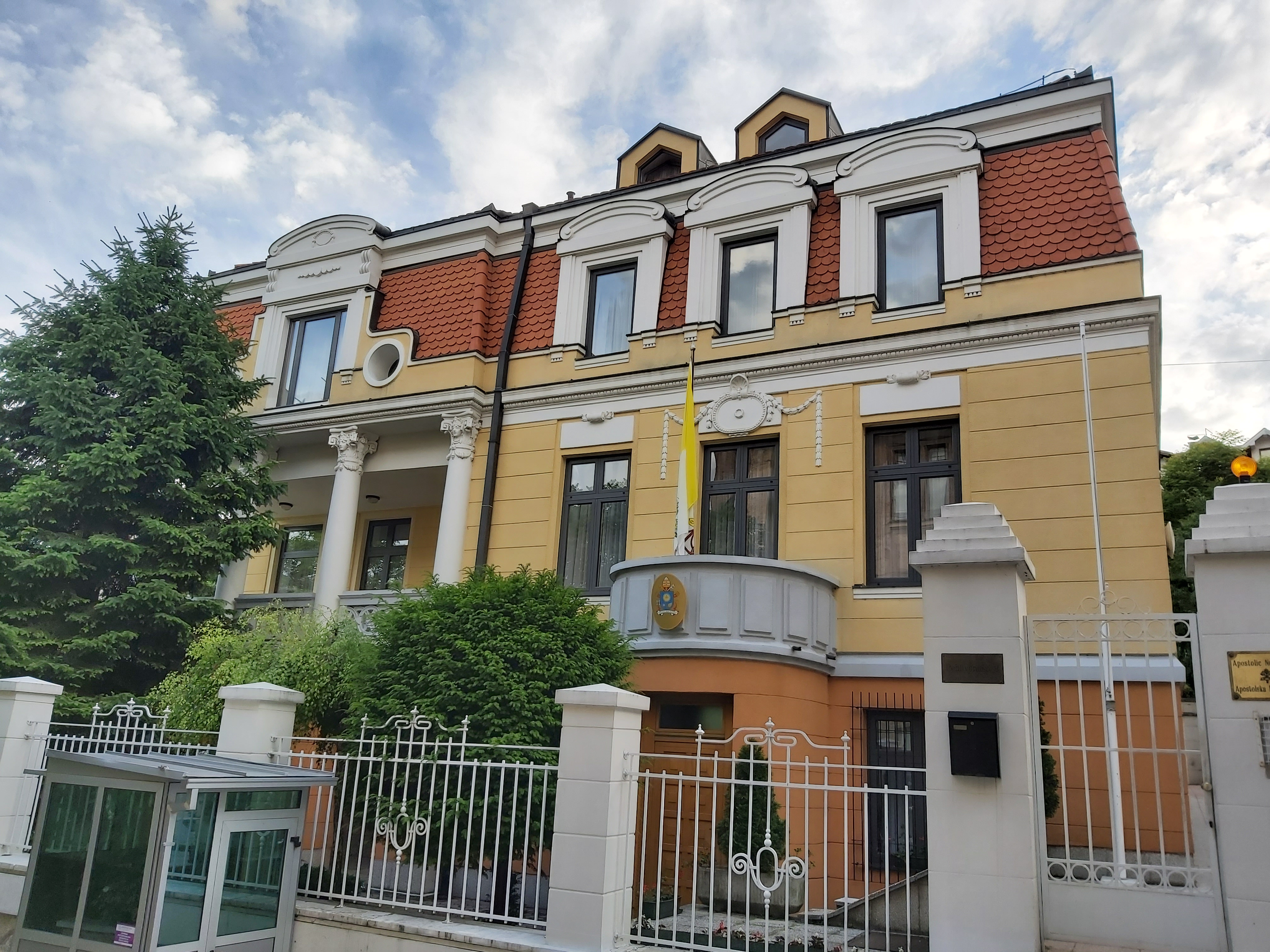
Apostolic Nunciature in Sarajevo

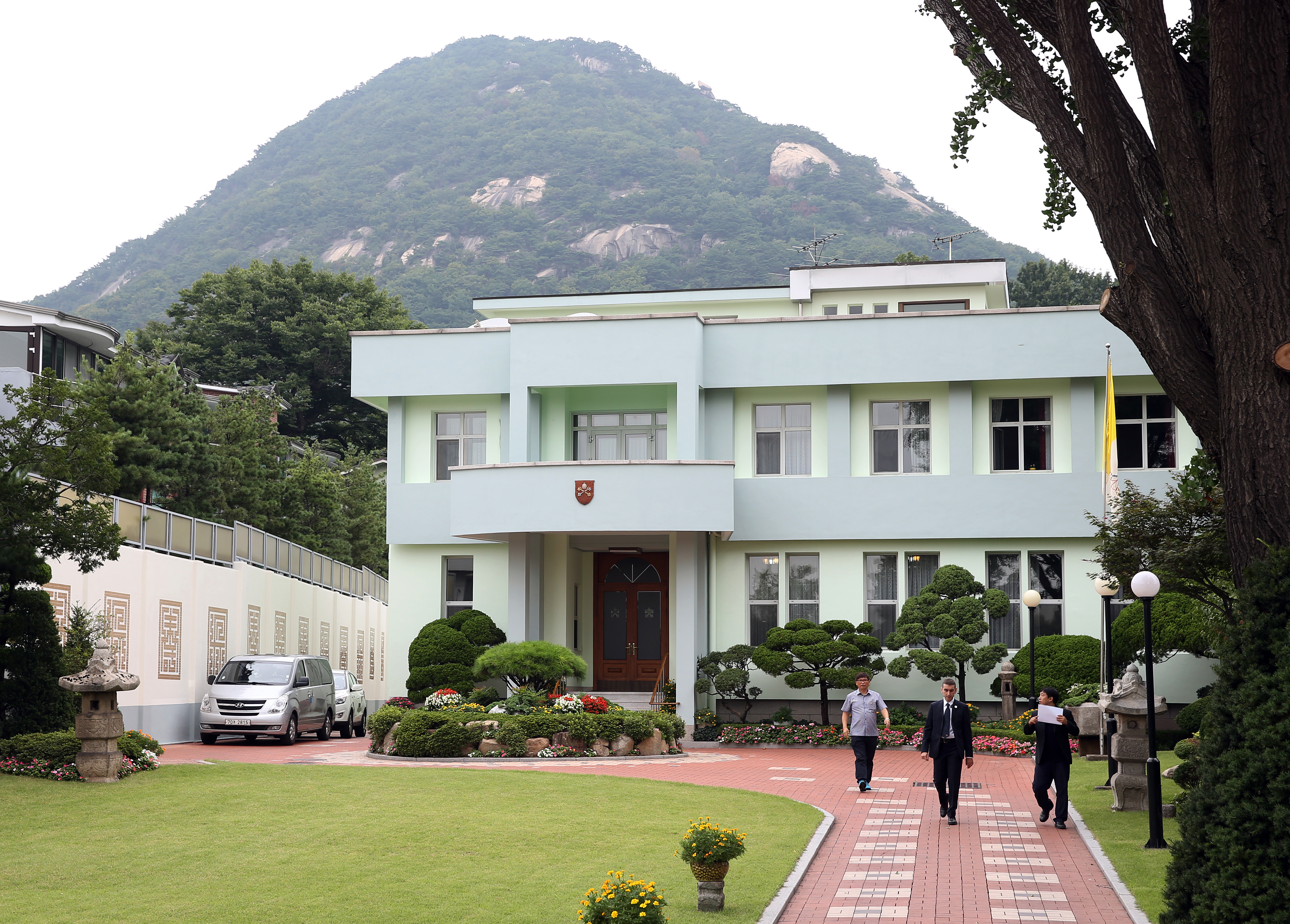
Apostolic Nunciature in Seoul

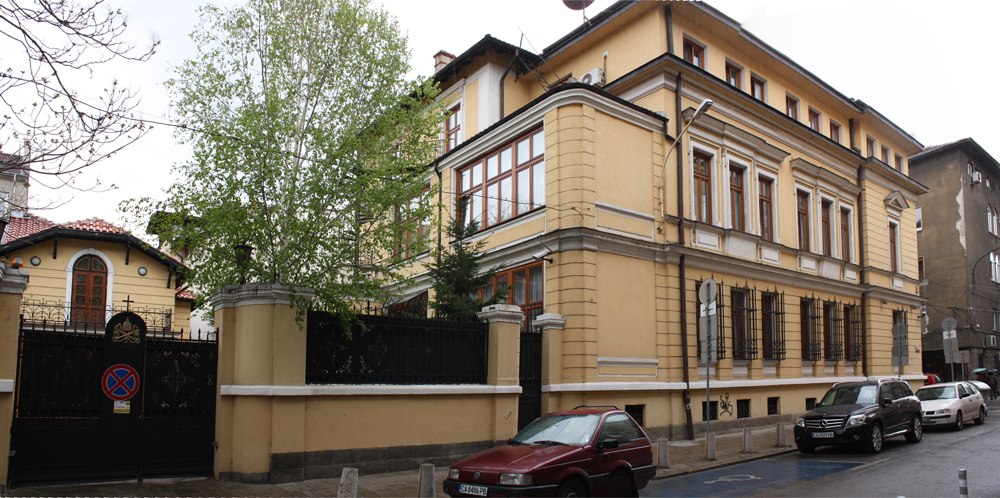
Apostolic Nunciature in Sofia

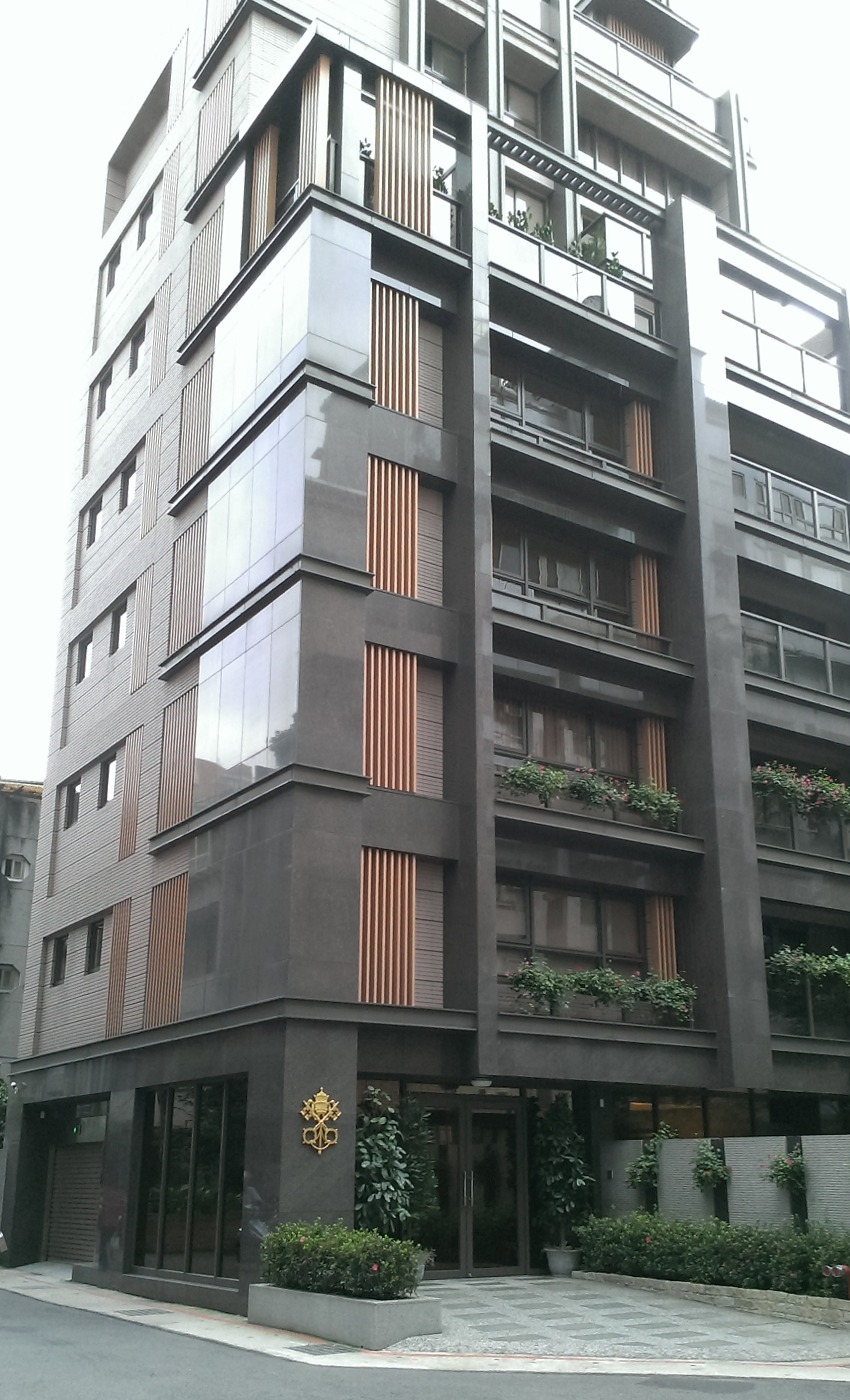
Apostolic Nunciature in Taipei

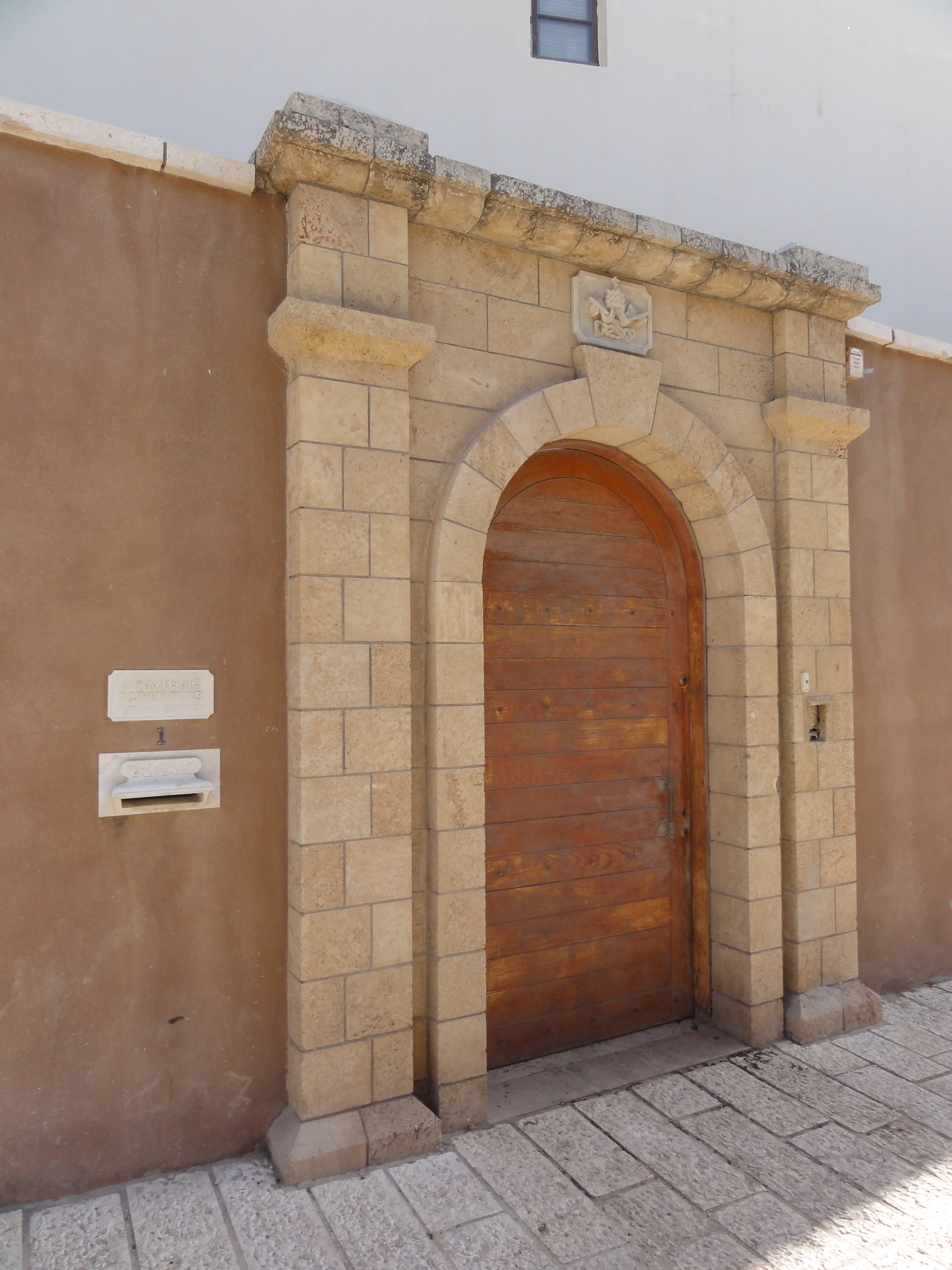
Apostolic Nunciature in Tel Aviv

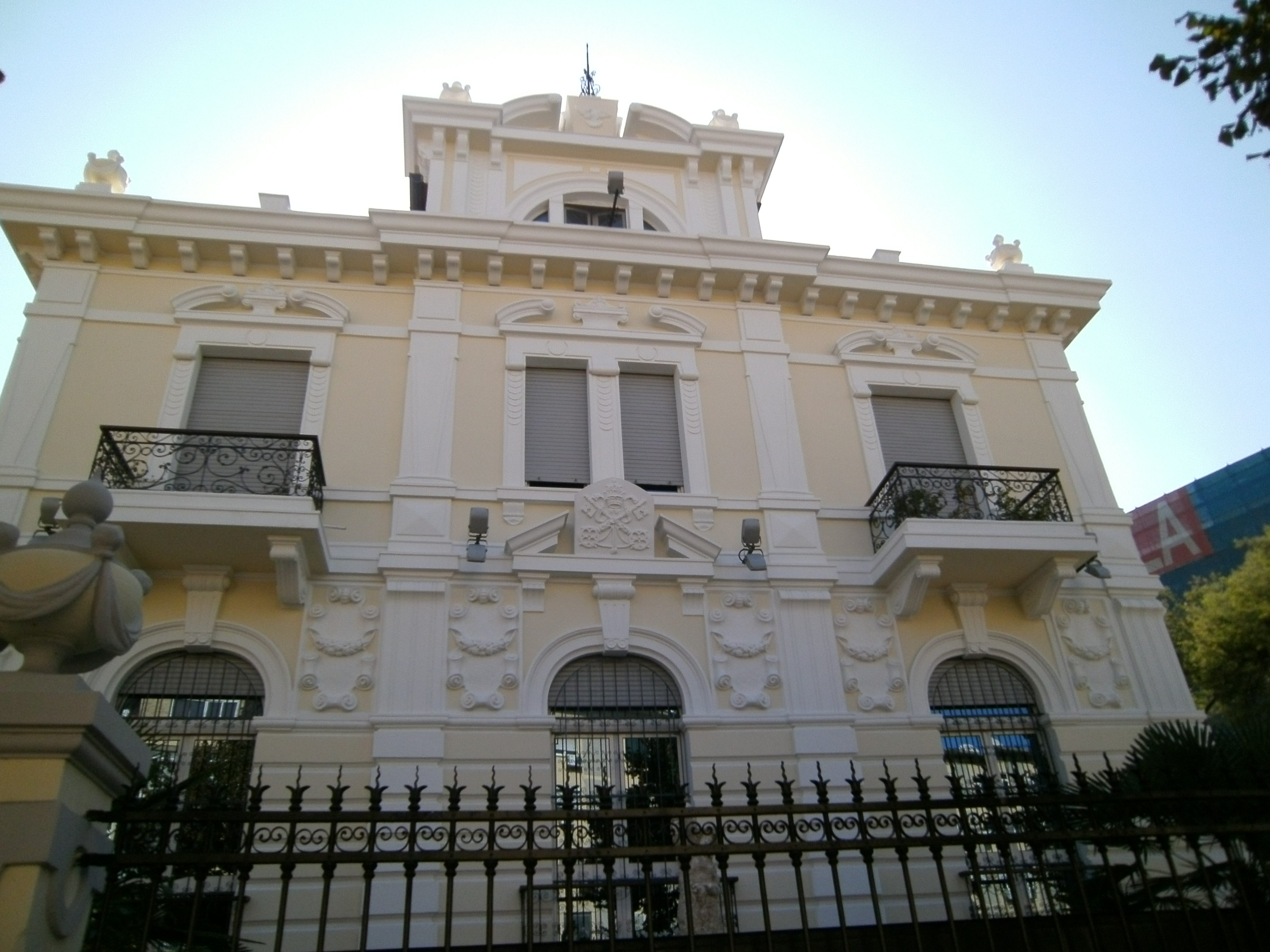
Apostolic Nunciature in Tirana

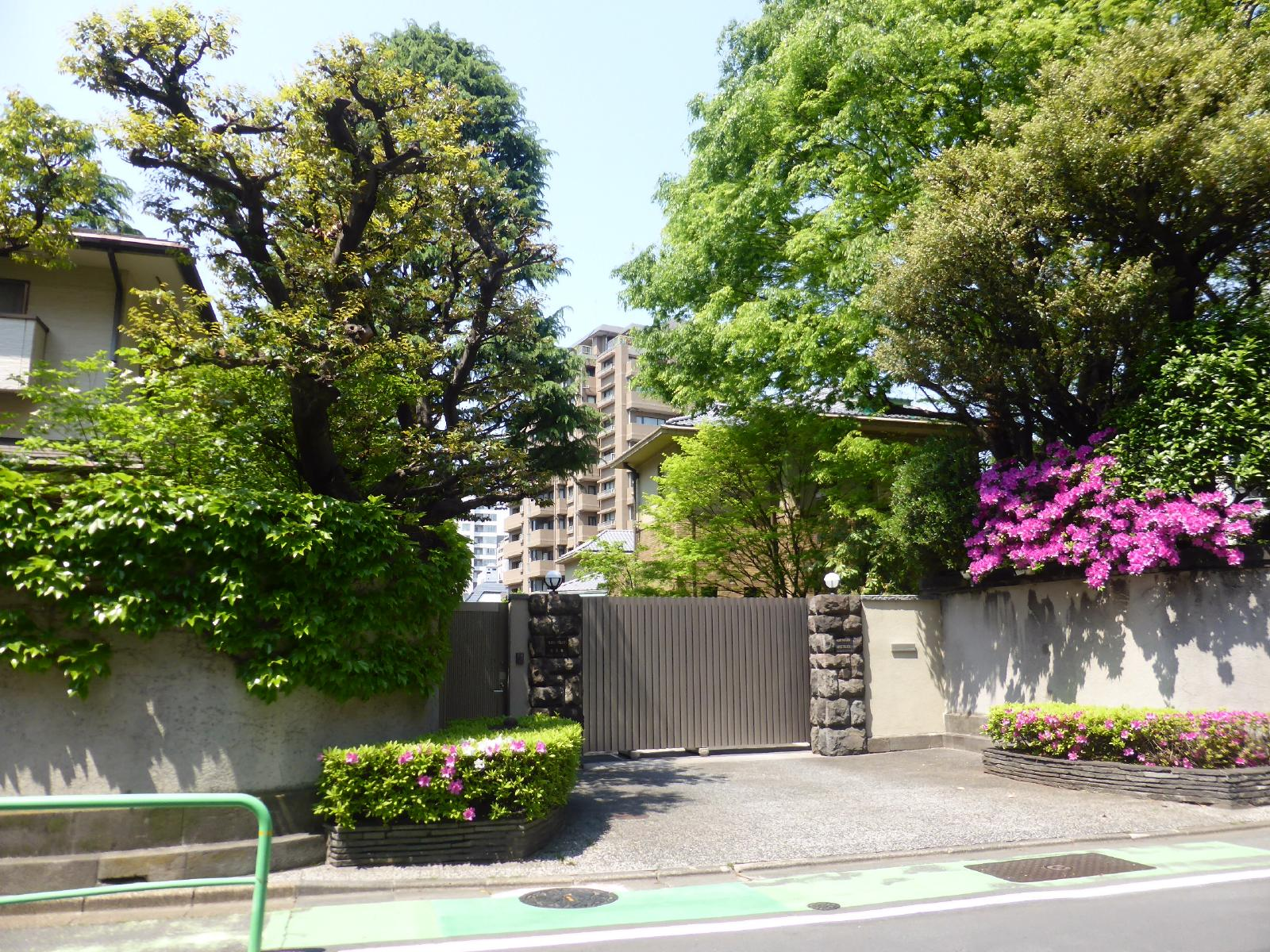
Apostolic Nunciature in Tokyo

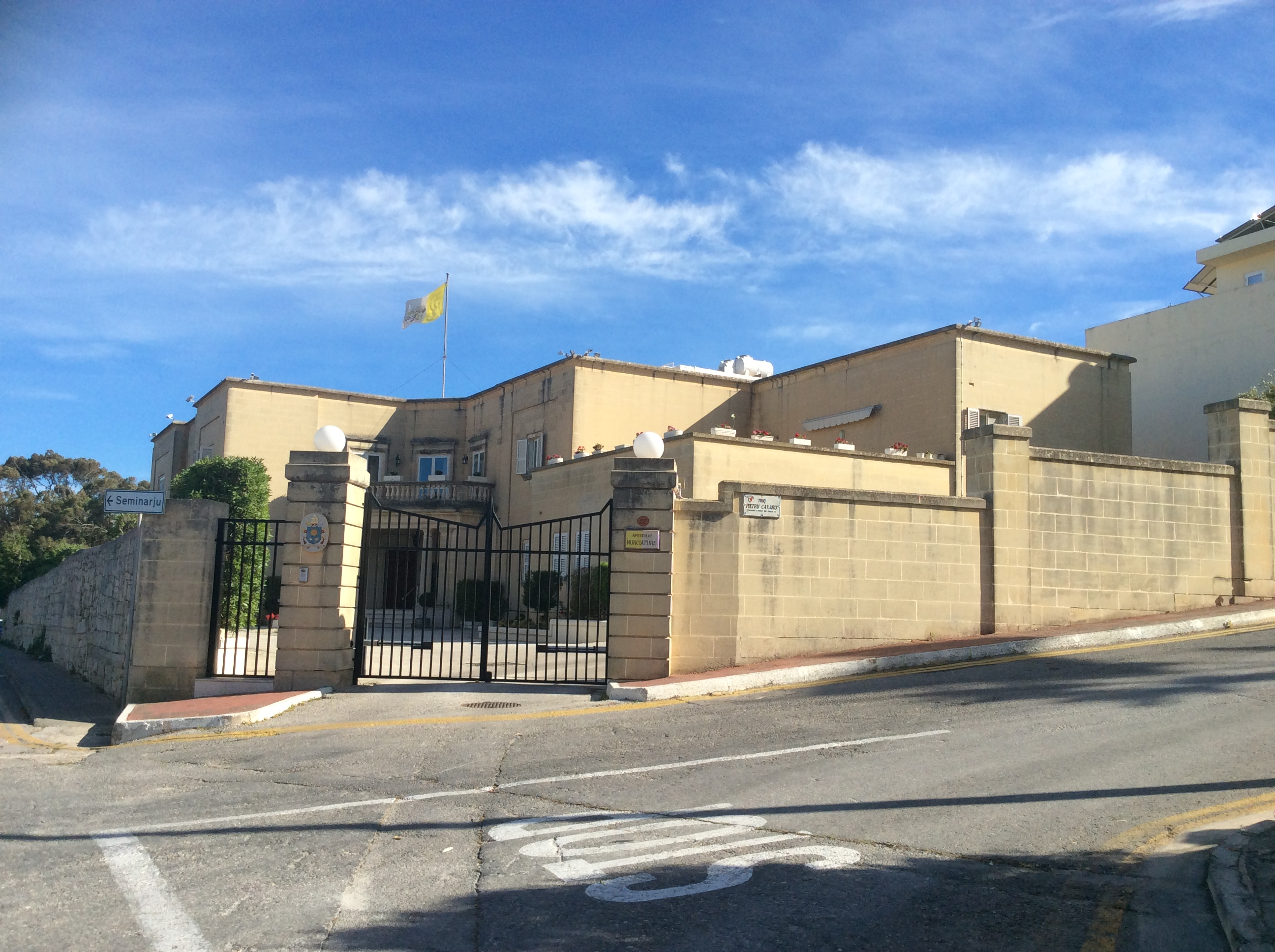
Apostolic Nunciature in Valletta

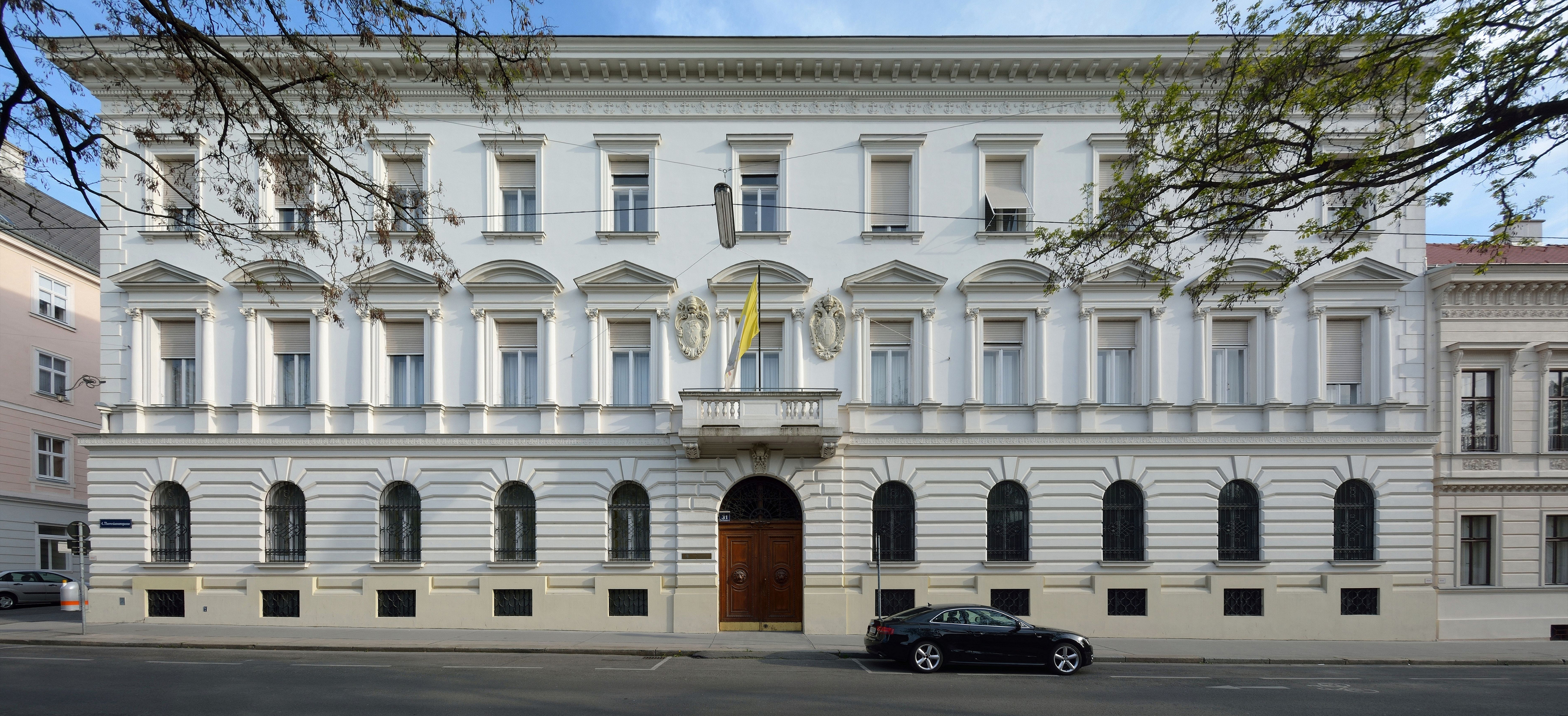
Apostolic Nunciature in Vienna

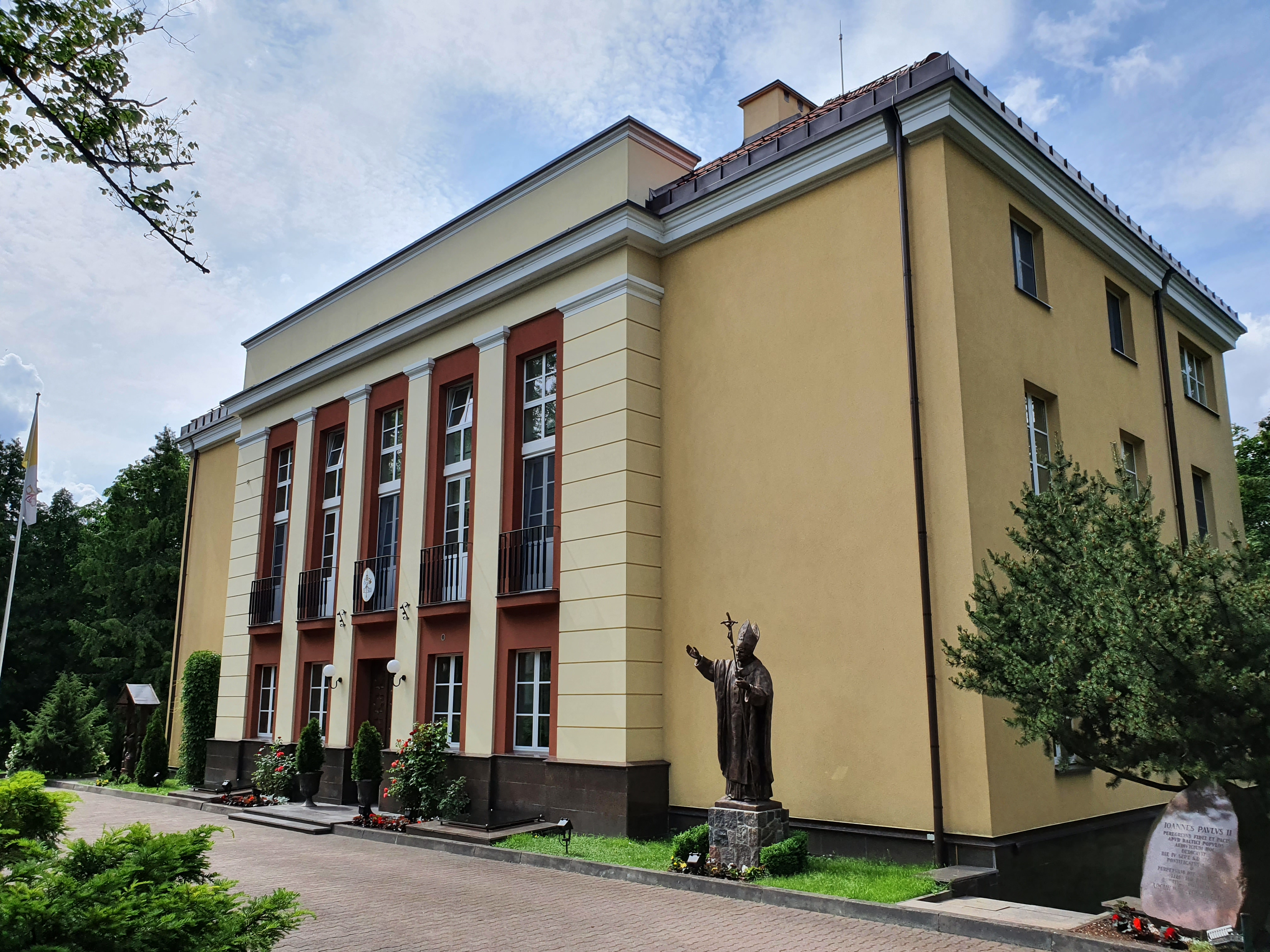
Apostolic Nunciature in Vilnius

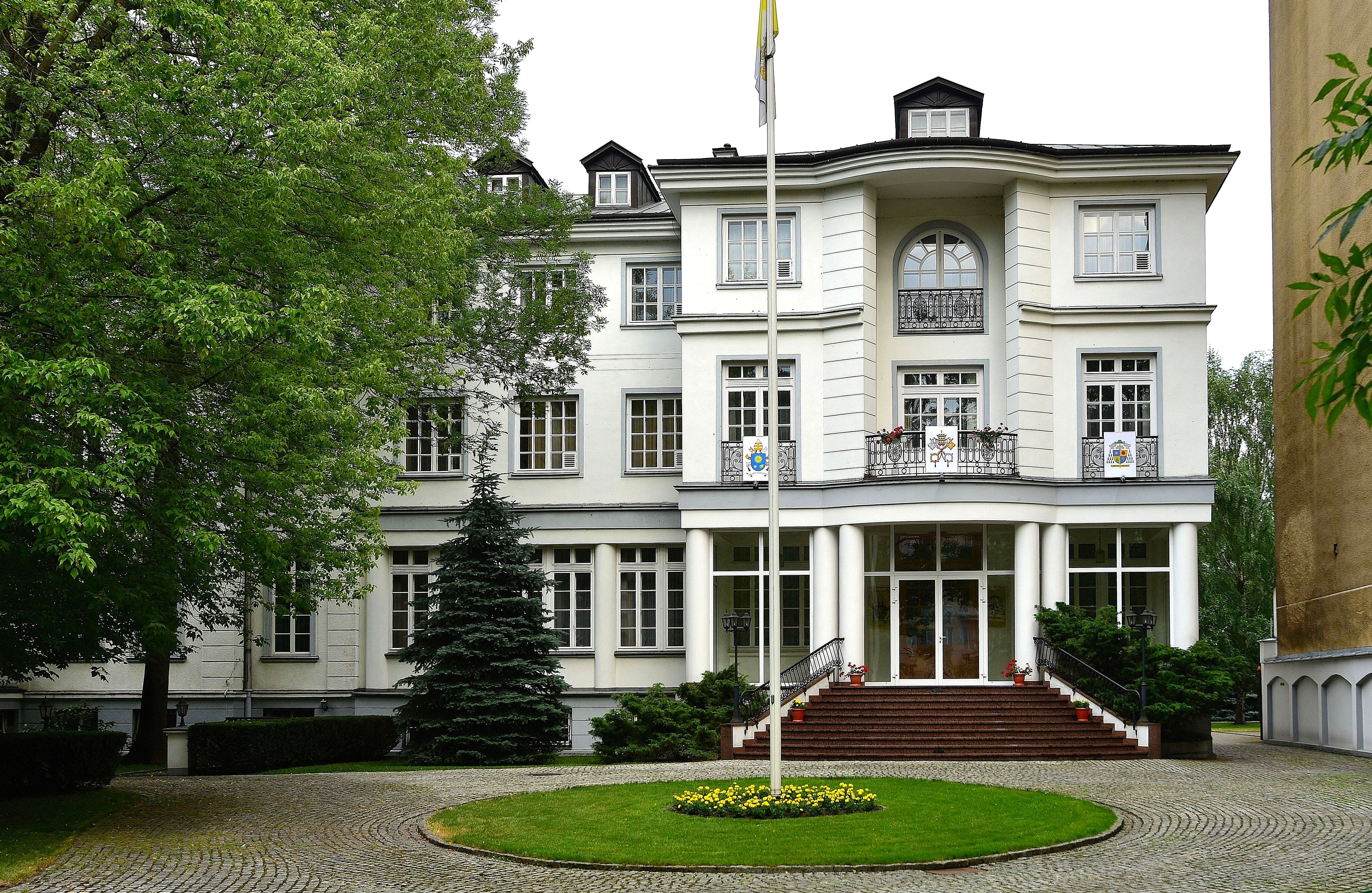
Apostolic Nunciature in Warsaw

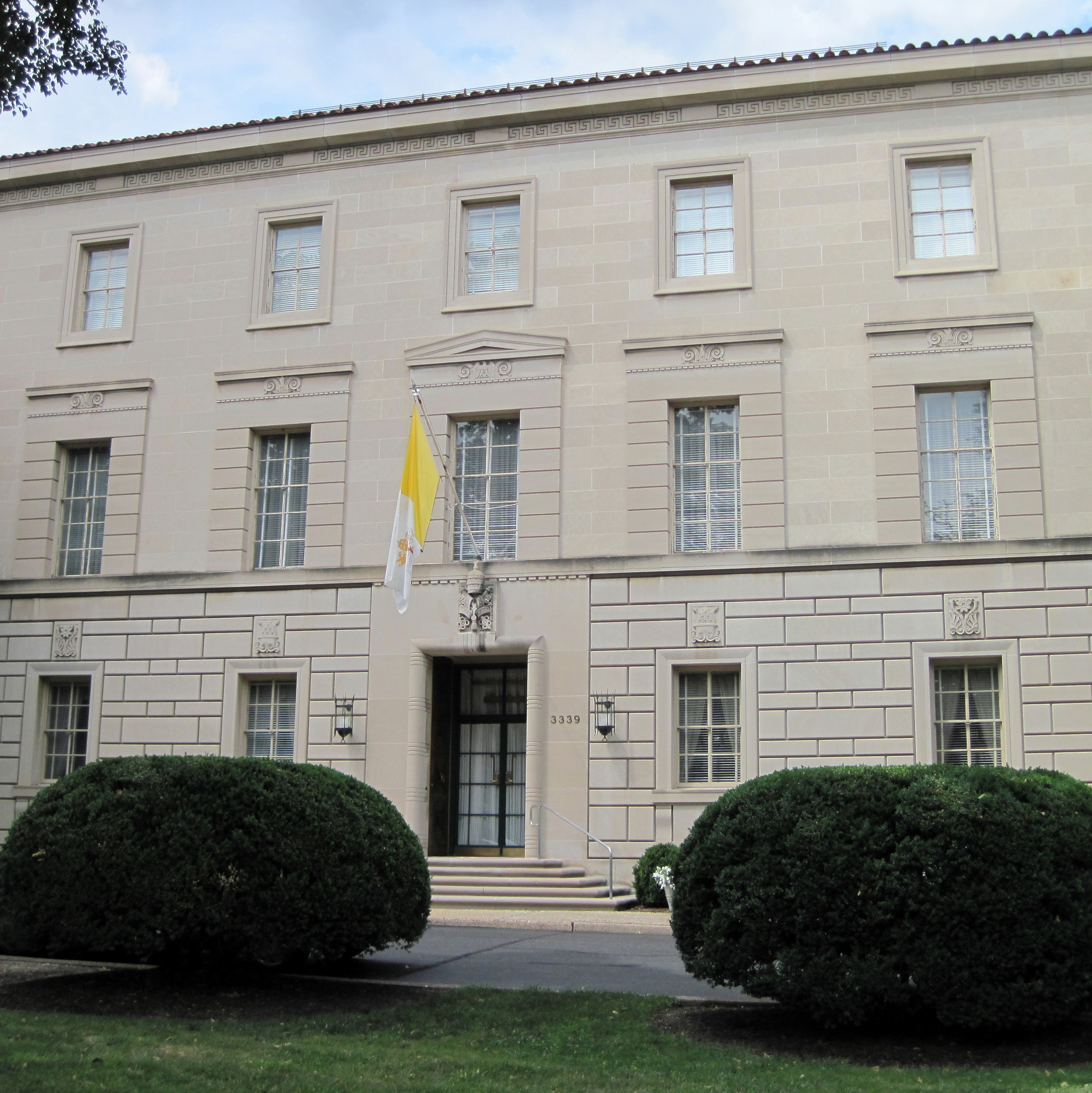
Apostolic Nunciature in Washington, D.C.

== Nunciatures that have ceased to exist ==
The following nunciatures are among those that have ceased to exist:

- Apostolic Nunciature to Bavaria (Note: Continues as an Apostolic Nunciature to Germany.)
- Apostolic Nunciature to Cologne
- Apostolic Nunciature to Florence (Note: Continues as an Apostolic Nunciature to Italy.)
- Apostolic Nunciature to Gratz (Note: Continues as an Apostolic Nunciature to Austria.)
- Apostolic Nunciature to Naples
- Apostolic Nunciature to Prussia
- Apostolic Nunciature to Savoy
- Apostolic Nunciature to Venice

== See also ==
- Apostolic Nunciature
- Foreign relations of the Holy See
- Holy See and the United Nations
- Index of Vatican City-related articles
- Legal status of the Holy See
- List of heads of the diplomatic missions of the Holy See
