= Apostolic Nunciature to Graz =

Former diplomatic post of the Holy See

The Apostolic Nunciature to Gratz was an ecclesiastical office of the Catholic Church located in Graz, Austria. It was a diplomatic post of the Holy See, whose representative is called the Apostolic Nuncio with the rank of an ambassador. The office ceased to exist in 1622 soon after the accession of Ferdinand II as Holy Roman Emperor.

== See also ==
- Apostolic Nunciature to Austria
- Foreign relations of the Holy See
- List of diplomatic missions of the Holy See
