= Foreign relations of the Holy See =

The Holy See has long been recognized as a subject of international law and as an active participant in international relations. It is distinct from the city-state of the Vatican City, over which the Holy See has "full ownership, exclusive dominion, and sovereign authority, governance and jurisdiction".

The diplomatic activities of the Holy See are directed by the Secretariat of State (headed by the Cardinal Secretary of State), through the Section for Relations with States.

While not being a member of the United Nations in its own right, the Holy See recognizes all UN member states except the People's Republic of China. In addition, the Holy See recognizes the State of Palestine and the Republic of China (Taiwan).

The term "Vatican Diplomatic Corps", by contrast with the diplomatic service of the Holy See, properly refers to all those diplomats accredited to the Holy See, not those who represent its interests to other nations and international bodies. Since 1961, Vatican diplomats also enjoy diplomatic immunity.

== History ==
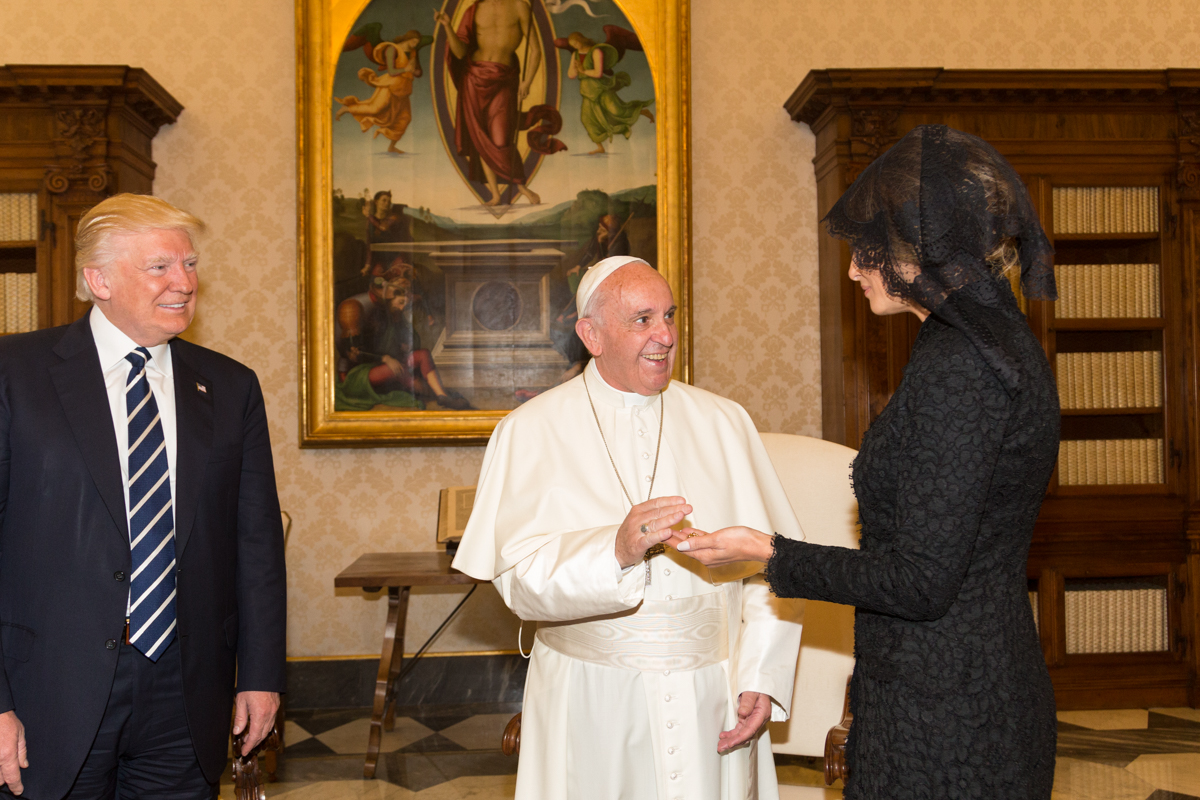
U.S. President Donald Trump and First Lady Melania Trump meet with Pope Francis in 2017.

Since medieval times the episcopal see of Rome has been recognized as a sovereign entity. Earlier, there were papal representatives (apocrisiarii) to the Emperors of Constantinople, beginning in 453, but they were not thought of as ambassadors. In the eleventh century the sending of papal representatives to princes, on a temporary or permanent mission, became frequent. In the fifteenth century it became customary for states to accredit permanent resident ambassadors to the Pope in Rome. The first permanent papal nunciature was established in 1500 in Venice. Their number grew in the course of the sixteenth century to thirteen, while internuncios (representatives of second rank) were sent to less-powerful states. After enjoying a brilliant period in the first half of the seventeenth century, papal diplomacy declined after the Peace of Westphalia in 1648, being assailed especially by royalists and Gallicans, and the number of functioning nuncios was reduced to two in the time of Napoleon, although in the same period, in 1805, Prussia became the first Protestant state to send an ambassador to Rome. There was a revival after the Congress of Vienna in 1815, which, while laying down that, in general, the order of precedence between ambassadors would be determined by the date of their arrival, allowed special precedence to be given to the nuncio, by which he would always be the dean of the diplomatic corps.

In spite of the extinction of the Papal States in 1870, and the consequent loss of territorial sovereignty, and in spite of some uncertainty among jurists as to whether it could continue to act as an independent personality in international matters, the Holy See continued in fact to exercise the right to send and receive diplomatic representatives, maintaining relations with states that included the major powers of Russia, Prussia, and Austria-Hungary. Countries continued to receive nuncios as diplomatic representatives of full rank, and where, in accordance with the decision of the 1815 Congress of Vienna, the Nuncio was not only a member of the Diplomatic Corps but its dean, this arrangement continued to be accepted by the other ambassadors.

The Holy See's loss of the Papal States to Italy in the 1870's was a factor in the Holy See's orientation towards soft power. The Holy See developed its relations with an increasing number of states. Particularly during the Papacy of Leo XIII, the Holy See sought to regain international standing by positioning itself as an arbiter of international disputes. Leo XIII prioritized common interests between the Holy See and the European colonial powers, tacitly supporting ecclesiastical colonization of Church missions along national lines.

With the First World War and its aftermath the number of states with diplomatic relations with the Holy See increased. For the first time since relations were broken between the Pope and Queen Elizabeth I of England, a British diplomatic mission to the Holy See was opened in 1914. The result was that, instead of diminishing, the number of diplomats accredited to the Holy See grew from sixteen in 1870 to twenty-seven in 1929, even before it again acquired territorial sovereignty with the founding of the State of Vatican City.

In the same period, the Holy See concluded a total of twenty-nine concordats and other agreements with states, including Austro-Hungary in 1881, Russia in 1882 and 1907, France in 1886 and 1923. Two of these concordats were registered at the League of Nations at the request of the countries involved.

While bereft of territorial sovereignty, the Holy See also accepted requests to act as arbitrator between countries, including a dispute between Germany and Spain over the Caroline Islands. Between 1870 and 1929, the Holy See was asked to mediate 13 international disputes.

The Lateran Treaty of 1929 and the founding of the Vatican City State was not followed by any great immediate increase in the number of states with which the Holy See had official relations. This came later, especially after the Second World War.

Since World War II, the Holy See's foreign relations are generally associated with the concept of soft power and generally seek to promote peace and humanitarian programs. The Holy See's foreign relations are less focused on traditional state interests like state security and the like.

The Vienna Convention of 18 April 1961 also established diplomatic immunity for the Vatican's foreign diplomats. Such immunity can only be revoked by the Holy See.

After the Cuban missile crisis demonstrated the risk of nuclear war, The Holy See became convinced that it had been too reluctant to engage with the communist countries. Through its foreign relations approach of Ostpolitik, the Vatican downplayed the role of ideological conflicts in international relations and reduced its anti-communist rhetoric. The Vatican also sought to use this approach to make the sacraments and church public life more available in the communist countries.

== Diplomatic relations ==
List of 183 countries which the Holy See maintains diplomatic relations with:

#	Country	Date
1	Portugal	12 February 1481
2	Spain	March 1559
3	Switzerland	17 August 1586
4	France	1600s
5	Brazil	23 January 1826
6	Netherlands	May 1829
7	Belgium	17 July 1834
8	Colombia	26 November 1835
9	Monaco	21 June 1875
10	Bolivia	6 August 1877
11	Ecuador	6 August 1877
12	Peru	10 October 1877
13	Chile	15 December 1877
14	Argentina	31 December 1877
15	Paraguay	31 December 1877
16	Uruguay	31 December 1877
17	Haiti	1881
18	Venezuela	1881
19	Luxembourg	January 1891
20	Costa Rica	19 August 1908
21	Honduras	19 December 1908
—	Nicaragua (suspended)	19 December 1908
22	Poland	16 June 1919
23	Czech Republic	22 March 1920
24	Hungary	10 August 1920
25	El Salvador	12 October 1922
26	Panama	21 September 1923
27	San Marino	April 1926
28	Romania	10 May 1927
29	Liberia	15 December 1927
30	Italy	24 June 1929
31	Ireland	27 November 1929
—	Sovereign Military Order of Malta	February 1930
32	Cuba	2 September 1935
33	Guatemala	16 March 1936
34	Japan	4 May 1942
35	Finland	31 July 1942
—	Republic of China	23 October 1942
36	Austria	9 August 1946
37	Lebanon	November 1946
38	Egypt	23 August 1947
39	India	12 June 1948
40	Indonesia	13 March 1950
41	Philippines	8 April 1951
42	Pakistan	6 October 1951
43	Syria	21 February 1953
44	Iran	2 May 1953
45	Germany	1 June 1954
46	Dominican Republic	16 June 1954
47	Ethiopia	20 March 1957
48	Turkey	25 January 1960
49	Senegal	17 November 1961
50	Burundi	11 February 1963
51	Republic of the Congo	16 February 1963
52	South Korea	11 December 1963
53	Rwanda	6 June 1964
54	Zambia	15 May 1965
55	Kenya	19 June 1965
56	Malta	15 December 1965
57	Malawi	5 February 1966
58	Iraq	26 August 1966
59	Cameroon	27 August 1966
60	Uganda	1 September 1966
61	Madagascar	24 December 1966
62	Lesotho	11 March 1967
63	Central African Republic	13 May 1967
64	Gabon	31 October 1967
65	Thailand	19 April 1968
66	Tanzania	28 April 1968
67	Kuwait	21 October 1968
68	Canada	16 October 1969
69	Mauritius	9 March 1970
70	Serbia	14 August 1970
71	Ivory Coast	26 October 1970
72	Benin	29 June 1971
73	Niger	20 July 1971
74	Algeria	6 March 1972
75	Tunisia	22 March 1972
76	Sudan	29 April 1972
77	Bangladesh	25 September 1972
78	Cyprus	31 January 1973
79	Australia	24 March 1973
80	Burkina Faso	14 June 1973
81	New Zealand	20 June 1973
82	Sri Lanka	6 September 1975
83	Ghana	20 November 1975
84	Nigeria	20 November 1975
85	Morocco	15 January 1976
86	Cape Verde	12 May 1976
87	Iceland	12 October 1976
88	Democratic Republic of the Congo	31 January 1977
89	Papua New Guinea	7 March 1977
90	Gambia	7 June 1978
91	Trinidad and Tobago	23 July 1978
92	Fiji	12 September 1978
93	Grenada	17 February 1979
94	Barbados	19 April 1979
95	Greece	17 July 1979
96	Jamaica	20 July 1979
97	Bahamas	27 July 1979
98	Mali	29 October 1979
99	Zimbabwe	26 June 1980
100	Togo	21 April 1981
101	Singapore	24 June 1981
102	Dominica	1 September 1981
103	Equatorial Guinea	24 December 1981
104	United Kingdom	16 January 1982
105	Denmark	2 August 1982
106	Norway	2 August 1982
107	Sweden	2 August 1982
108	Belize	9 March 1983
109	Nepal	10 September 1983
110	United States	10 January 1984
111	Solomon Islands	9 May 1984
112	Seychelles	27 July 1984
113	Saint Lucia	1 September 1984
114	São Tomé and Príncipe	21 December 1984
115	Liechtenstein	28 August 1985
116	Guinea	21 June 1986
117	Guinea-Bissau	12 July 1986
118	Antigua and Barbuda	15 December 1986
119	Chad	28 November 1988
120	Saint Vincent and the Grenadines	16 April 1990
121	Bulgaria	6 December 1990
122	Albania	7 September 1991
123	Lithuania	30 September 1991
124	Latvia	1 October 1991
125	Estonia	3 October 1991
126	Croatia	8 February 1992
127	Slovenia	8 February 1992
128	Ukraine	8 February 1992
129	Eswatini	11 March 1992
130	Mongolia	4 April 1992
131	Armenia	23 May 1992
132	Azerbaijan	23 May 1992
133	Georgia	23 May 1992
134	Moldova	23 May 1992
135	Nauru	1 June 1992
136	Bosnia and Herzegovina	18 August 1992
137	Kyrgyzstan	27 August 1992
138	Mexico	21 September 1992
139	Kazakhstan	17 October 1992
140	Uzbekistan	17 October 1992
141	Belarus	11 November 1992
142	Slovakia	1 January 1993
143	Marshall Islands	30 December 1993
144	Suriname	16 January 1994
145	Federated States of Micronesia	26 January 1994
146	Jordan	3 March 1994
147	South Africa	5 March 1994
148	Cambodia	25 March 1994
149	Samoa	10 June 1994
150	Israel	15 June 1994
151	Vanuatu	20 July 1994
152	Tonga	24 August 1994
153	North Macedonia	21 December 1994
154	Kiribati	10 April 1995
155	Andorra	16 June 1995
156	Eritrea	15 July 1995
157	Namibia	12 September 1995
158	Mozambique	14 December 1995
159	Turkmenistan	10 June 1996
160	Tajikistan	15 June 1996
161	Sierra Leone	30 July 1996
162	Libya	10 March 1997
163	Guyana	9 June 1997
164	Angola	8 July 1997
165	Yemen	13 October 1998
166	Palau	17 December 1998
—	Cook Islands	29 April 1999
167	Saint Kitts and Nevis	19 July 1999
168	Bahrain	12 January 2000
169	Djibouti	20 May 2000
170	Timor-Leste	20 May 2002
171	Qatar	18 November 2002
172	Montenegro	16 December 2006
173	United Arab Emirates	30 May 2007
174	Botswana	4 November 2008
175	Russia	9 December 2009
176	Malaysia	27 July 2011
177	South Sudan	22 February 2013
—	State of Palestine	13 May 2015
178	Mauritania	9 December 2016
179	Myanmar	4 May 2017
180	Oman	23 February 2023

== Bilateral relations ==
The Holy See, as a non-state sovereign entity and full subject of international law, started establishing diplomatic relations with sovereign states in the 15th century. It had the territory of the States of the Church under its direct sovereign rule since centuries before that time. Currently it has the territory of the State of the Vatican City under its direct sovereign rule. In the period of 1870–1929 between the annexation of Rome by the Kingdom of Italy and the ratification of the Lateran Treaty establishing the current Vatican City State, the Holy See was devoid of territory. In this period some states suspended their diplomatic relations, but others retained them (or established such relations for the first time or reestablished them after a break), so that the number of states that did have diplomatic relations with the Holy See almost doubled (from 16 to 27) in the period between 1870 and 1929.

The Holy See currently has diplomatic relations with 184 sovereign states. These include 181 United Nations member states, the UN observer State of Palestine, the partially internationally recognized Republic of China (Taiwan), and the Cook Islands (a non-UN state in free association with New Zealand). In addition, it maintains relations with the sovereign entity Order of Malta and the supranational union European Union. The Holy See presently lacks diplomatic relations with 12 UN member states.

By agreement with the government of Vietnam, it has a non-resident papal representative to that country. It has official formal contacts, without establishing diplomatic relations, with: Afghanistan, Brunei, Somalia and Saudi Arabia.

The Holy See additionally maintains some apostolic delegates to local Catholic Church communities which are not accredited to the governments of the respective states and work only in an unofficial, non-diplomatic capacity. The regions and states where such non-diplomatic delegates operate are: Brunei, Comoros, Laos, Maldives, Somalia, Vietnam, Jerusalem and the Palestinian territories (Palestine), Pacific Ocean (Tuvalu, dependent territories), Arabian Peninsula (foreigners in Saudi Arabia), Antilles (dependent territories), apostolic delegate to Kosovo (Republic of Kosovo) and the apostolic prefecture of Western Sahara (Sahrawi Arab Democratic Republic).

The Holy See has no relations of any kind with the following states:

- Kingdom of Bhutan (see Catholic Church in Bhutan)
- Republic of the Maldives (see Catholic Church in the Maldives)
- People's Republic of China (see Catholic Church in China)
- Democratic People's Republic of Korea (see Catholic Church in North Korea)

91 embassies to the Holy See are based in Rome.

The Holy See is the only European subject of international law to have diplomatic relations with the Republic of China (Taiwan), although there have been reports of informal talks between the Holy See and the government of the People's Republic of China on establishing diplomatic relations, restoring the situation that existed when the papal representative, Antonio Riberi, was part of the diplomatic corps that accepted the Communist government military victory instead of withdrawing with the Nationalist authorities to Taiwan. He was later expelled, after which the Holy See sent its representative to Taipei instead.

During the pontificate of Pope Benedict XVI relations were established with Montenegro (2006), the United Arab Emirates (2007), Botswana (2008), Russia (2009), Malaysia (2011), and South Sudan (2013), and during the pontificate of Pope Francis, diplomatic relations were established with the State of Palestine (2015), Mauritania (2016), Myanmar (2017), and Oman (2023). "Relations of a special nature" had previously been in place with Russia.

=== Africa ===
Country	Formal relations begun or resumed	Notes
Algeria	6 March 1972	See Algeria–Holy See relations.: During the Algerian War of 1954–1962 the Holy See did not take sides nor, in view of its pledge not to take part in temporal rivalries unless there was a mutual appeal to it, was there Vatican mediation between the French government and the Algerian rebels who requested it.; After Algeria became independent, Algeria maintained diplomatic ties with the Holy See and allowed Roman Catholic priests to continue ministering to the remaining Catholics in Algeria.
Central African Republic	13 May 1967	See Central African Republic–Holy See relations.: The Holy See has a nunciature in Bangui.
Democratic Republic of the Congo	31 January 1977	See Democratic Republic of the Congo–Holy See relations.: The Holy See has an apostolic nunciature in Kinshasa.; The DRC maintains an embassy near Vatican City.
Egypt	23 August 1947	See Apostolic Nunciature to Egypt. Pope Francis met Grand Imam of al-Azhar Ahmad al-Tayyeb in several occasions to improve relations among different faiths.
Ivory Coast	26 October 1970	See Holy See-Ivory Coast relations.: The Holy See has an apostolic nunciature in Abidjan.; Ivory Coast maintains an embassy in Rome for the Holy See.
Kenya	19 June 1965	The Holy See has a nunciature in Nairobi.; Kenya is represented in the Holy See through its embassy in Paris, France.; Pope John Paul II visited Kenya thrice during his tenure, in 1980, 1985 and 1995. Pope Francis visited Kenya in November 2015.
Madagascar	24 December 1966	The Holy See has a nunciature in Antananarivo.; Madagascar has an embassy in Rome.; "Pope Prays for Peace in Madagascar"
Republic of the Congo	16 February 1963	See Republic of the Congo–Holy See relations.: The Holy See maintains an apostolic nunciature in Brazzaville.
Rwanda	6 June 1964	The Holy See has an nunciature in Kigali.; Rwanda has an embassy to the Holy See.; Relations between the two States have been strained since the Rwanda genocide. Many bishops were under the ideological influence of the previous Hutu nationalist government, and the government of Paul Kagame has tried to purge the episcopacy of hostile elements.; Priests that participated in the killings behaved in a way no different from the majority of the population, a phenomenon which has led to a grave collective and spiritual guilt, and has led to the growth of Evangelical churches and Islamic organizations. In part, this has been attributed to an ethnic-based liberation theology, which was denounced by the Holy See in the 1970s and 1980s.
Sudan	29 April 1972	The Holy See has a nunciature in Khartoum.; Sudan has an embassy in Rome.; "Pope Urges Sudan to End Military Campaign in Darfur"
Mozambique	14 December 1995	The Holy See sent Matteo Zuppi, a now Cardinal and the Archbishop of Bologna, to the Rome General Peace Accords, which helped resolve the Mozambique Civil War, as well as his Mozambique counterpart Jaime Pedro Gonçalves

=== Americas ===
Country	Formal relations begun or resumed	Notes
Argentina	31 December 1877	See Argentina–Holy See relations.: Argentina has an embassy to the Holy See in Rome.; The Holy See has an embassy in Buenos Aires.; "Argentine Ministry of Foreign Relations and Cult: List of Bilateral Treaties with the Holy See" (in Spanish only)
Bolivia	6 August 1877	Bolivian President Evo Morales met with Pope Francis in 2015, and 2016.
Brazil	23 January 1826	See Brazil–Holy See relations
Canada	16 October 1969	See Canada–Holy See relations.
Cuba	2 September 1935	See Cuba–Holy See relations
Dominican Republic	16 June 1954	See Apostolic Nunciature to the Dominican Republic.
Ecuador	6 August 1877	See Apostolic Nunciature to Ecuador.
Haiti	1881	See Apostolic Nunciature to Haiti.
Mexico	21 September 1992	See Holy See–Mexico relations.: The Holy See assigned an Apostolic Delegate as resident representative in Mexico in 1904. In 1992, after more than 130 years, the Mexican Government reestablished diplomatic relations with the Holy See and restored civil rights to the Roman Catholic Church in Mexico.; Holy See has an Apostolic Nunciature in Mexico City.; Mexico has an embassy in Rome to the Holy See.
Nicaragua	19 December 1908 (suspended)	See Holy See–Nicaragua relations.
Paraguay	31 December 1877	See Apostolic Nunciature to Paraguay.
Peru	10 October 1877	See Holy See–Peru relations
United States	10 January 1984	See Holy See–United States relations.: Holy See priorities included freedom of religion, inter-religious dialogue (particularly with the Muslim world), ecumenism, opposition to abortion and same-sex marriage, and peace (particularly for the Middle East). Pope Francis has also publicly expressed concern over the issue of climate change, describing the protection of the environment as a moral responsibility to safeguard God's creation.; The principal U.S. official is Ambassador Brian Burch, as of 22 July 2026. The Apostolic Nuncio to the United States is Archbishop Gabriele Giordano Caccia, as of 22 July 2026.; The U.S. Embassy to the Holy See is located in Rome in the Villa Domiziana. The Nunciature to the United States is located in Washington, D.C., at 3339 Massachusetts Avenue, N.W.
Uruguay	31 December 1877	See Holy See–Uruguay relations: The Holy See has a nunciatue in Montevideo.; Uruguay has an embassy in Rome to the Holy See.
Venezuela	1881	See Holy See–Venezuela relations. The Holy See has a nunciature in Caracas. Venezuela has an embassy in Rome.

=== Asia ===
Country	Formal relations begun or resumed	Notes
Armenia	23 May 1992	In 2000, the Vatican recognized the Armenian genocide.; Armenia has an embassy in Vatican City.; The Holy See is accredited to Armenia through its nunciature in Yerevan, Armenia.
Azerbaijan	23 May 1992	Diplomatic relations with the Holy See were established on May 23, 1992.; Azerbaijan is accredited to the Holy See through its embassy in Paris, France.; The Holy See is accredited to Azerbaijan through its nunciature in Ankara, Turkey.
Bangladesh	25 September 1972	See Bangladesh–Holy See relations.: The Holy See has a nunciature in the Baridhara Diplomatic Enclave in Dhaka.; Bangladesh also has an ambassador accredited to the Holy See.
China, Republic of	23 October 1942	See Holy See–Taiwan relations.: Diplomatic relations between the Holy See and China began in 1942, at that time the representative of China was the Republic of China (ROC). When the Chinese Communist Party won the Chinese Civil War and established the People's Republic of China (PRC) in 1949, the Holy See chose not to move its diplomatic representative to Taipei, Taiwan where the government of the Republic of China had retreated to. However, the Communist government expelled it, and the Holy See's diplomatic mission was then transferred to Taipei in 1951.; In 1971, when the seat of China at the United Nations was adjudicated to the government of the PRC, the Holy See continued to maintain formal diplomatic relations with China through the ROC.; Since 1971, the Holy See maintains a downgraded Apostolic Nunciature in Taipei, but without a Nuncio. The mission is headed only by a chargé d'affaires who carries on the business of the diplomatic mission.; The diplomatic relationship is significant from the perspective of the ROC because its embassy to the Holy See is its only remaining embassy in Europe.; For its contacts with the PRC, see China–Holy See relations.
India	12 June 1948	See Holy See–India relations.: The Holy See has a nunciature in New Delhi.; India has an embassy in Rome.
Indonesia	13 March 1950	See Holy See–Indonesia relations.: The Holy See has a nunciature in Jakarta.; Indonesia has an embassy in Rome.
Iran	2 May 1953	See Holy See–Iran relations. The two countries have had formal diplomatic relations since 1954, since the pontificate of Pius XII, and have been maintained during Islamic revolution. In 2008 relations between Iran and the Holy See were "warming", and Mahmoud Ahmadinejad "said the Vatican was a positive force for justice and peace" when he met with the Papal nuncio to Iran, Archbishop Jean-Paul Gobel.
Israel	15 June 1994	See Holy See–Israel relations.
Jordan	3 March 1994	See Holy See–Jordan relations.
Kazakhstan	17 October 1992	See Holy See–Kazakhstan relations.
Kurdistan	—	See Holy See–Kurdistan Region relations.
Kuwait	21 October 1968	The first Kuwaiti Ambassador to the Vatican was accredited in March 1973. As he presented his credentials to Pope Paul VI, the Pontiff treated the establishing of relations as a sign of growing tolerance within Kuwait.; The Holy See has a nunciature in Kuwait City.; Kuwait has an embassy in Rome.
Lebanon	November 1946	See Holy See–Lebanon relations.: The Holy See has a nunciature in Harissa.; Lebanon has an embassy in Rome.
Malaysia	27 July 2011	See Holy See–Malaysia relations.: Diplomatic relations were established in 2011; Malaysia is represented at the Holy See through its embassy in Bern (Switzerland).
Myanmar	4 May 2017	See Holy See–Myanmar relations.: Diplomatic relations were established on 4 May 2017, following a meeting between Pope Francis and Myanmar's State Counsellor Aung San Suu Kyi.; The Holy See is set to establish a nunciature in Myanmar.; Myanmar is set to establish an embassy in the Vatican.
Nepal	10 September 1983	See Holy See–Nepal relations.
Oman	23 February 2023	See Holy See–Oman relations.
Pakistan	6 October 1951	See Holy See–Pakistan relations.: The Holy See has a nunciature in Islamabad.; Pakistan also has a representative embassy, situated in Rome.; "Pope Only Wants Inter-Faith Harmony, Pakistani Bishops Say"
Palestine	13 May 2015	See Holy See–Palestine relations. The Holy See and the State of Palestine established formal diplomatic relations in 2015, through the mutual signing of the Comprehensive Agreement between the Holy See and the State of Palestine. An Apostolic Delegation (a non-diplomatic mission of the Holy See) denominated "Jerusalem and Palestine" had existed since 11 February 1948, and the Palestine Liberation Organization had established official (non diplomatic) relations with the Holy See in October 1994, with the opening of an office in Rome. The Holy See, along with many other states, supports a two-state solution for Israel and Palestine.
Philippines	8 April 1951	See Holy See–Philippines relations.: The Holy See has a nunciature in Manila.; The Philippines has an embassy in Vatican City.
Qatar	18 November 2002	The Holy See is accredited to Qatar through its nunciature in Kuwait City.; Qatar has an embassy in Rome.
Saudi Arabia	11 December 1963	See Holy See–Saudi Arabia relations.
South Korea	11 December 1963	See Holy See–South Korea relations.: The Holy See has a nunciature in Seoul.; The Pope John Paul II visited the Republic of Korea twice during his pontificate in 1984 and 1989. – the 1984 visit to Seoul was for the canonization of the 103 Korean martyrs held outside Rome in a break from tradition.; In 2000, then President of the Republic of Korea Kim Dae Jung made a state visit to Vatican City the first South Korean head of state to do so.
Sri Lanka	6 September 1975	See Holy See–Sri Lanka relations.
Syria	21 February 1953	See Holy See–Syria relations: The Holy See has a nunciature in Damascus.; John Paul II visited Syria in 2001 and was the first pope to have been to an Islamic mosque, the Umayyad Mosque in Damascus, which includes the relics of John the Baptist.; Syrian President Bashar al-Assad attended Pope John Paul II's funeral.
Thailand	19 April 1968	The Holy See has a nunciature in Bangkok.; Thailand has an embassy in Rome, Italy.; 1994.07.16: Branched to create Apostolic Nunciature of Cambodia; Piromya on the occasion of the completion of his mission in Thailand.
Turkey	25 January 1960	See Holy See–Turkey relations.: The Holy See has a nunciature in Ankara.; Turkey has an embassy in Rome.; In February 2018, Turkish President Recep Tayyip Erdoğan met Pope Francis in the Vatican.
United Arab Emirates	30 May 2007	See Holy See–United Arab Emirates relations.: Pope Francis visited the United Arab Emirates in February 2019 and became the first pontiff to ever visit and hold papal mass in the Arabian Peninsula.; The Holy See has is accredited to the United Arab Emirates through its nunciature in Kuwait City.; United Arab Emirates is accredited to the Holy See through its embassy in Madrid.
Vietnam		See Holy See–Vietnam relations.
Yemen	13 October 1998	Yemeni President Ali Abdullah Saleh met Pope John Paul II in November 2004.

=== Europe ===
Country	Formal relations begun or resumed	Notes
Albania	7 September 1991	See Albania–Holy See relations.: Albania has a resident embassy to the Holy See in Rome; The Holy See has a resident nunciature (embassy) in Tirana; Pope John Paul II was the first Pope to visit Albania, which took place immediately after the fall of communism
Belgium	17 July 1834	See Apostolic Nunciature to Belgium.
Bosnia and Herzegovina	18 August 1992	See Bosnia and Herzegovina–Holy See relations.: Bosnia and Herzegovina has a resident embassy to the Holy See in Rome.; The Holy See has a resident nunciature in Sarajevo.
Croatia	8 February 1992	See Croatia–Holy See relations.
Cyprus	31 January 1973	See Apostolic Nunciature to Cyprus.
Denmark	2 August 1982	Denmark is represented at the Holy See through its embassy in Bern, Switzerland.; The Holy See is represented in Denmark through its embassy in Stockholm, Sweden.
European Union	10 November 1970	See Holy See–European Union relations. Many of the founders of the European Union were inspired by Catholic ideals, notably Robert Schuman, Alcide de Gasperi, Konrad Adenauer, and Jean Monnet.
Finland	31 July 1942	Finland has a resident embassy to the Holy See in Rome.
France	1600s	See France–Holy See relations.
Germany	1 June 1954	See Germany–Holy See relations.: Germany has a resident embassy to the Holy See in Rome.; The Holy See has a resident nunciature in Berlin.
Greece	17 July 1979	See Greece–Holy See relations.: The Holy See established its Apostolic Nunciature to Greece in Athens in 1980. The Greek ambassador to the Holy See at first resided in Paris, where he was concurrently accredited to France; in 1988 a separate Greek embassy to the Holy See, situated in Rome, was established.; In May 2001, Pope John Paul II made a visit of pilgrimage to Greece.
Iceland	12 October 1976	Diplomatic relations were established in 1977, but the Pope Paul VI in his greeting to the first Ambassador from Iceland referred to these relations as "the millenary ties between your people (i.e. of Iceland) and the Catholic Church".
Ireland	27 November 1929	See Holy See–Ireland relations. The majority of Irish people are Roman Catholic. The Holy See has a nunciature in Dublin. Ireland had, in Rome, an embassy to the Holy See. The government closed that embassy in 2011 for financial reasons; however, it re-opened the embassy in 2014. Currently Ireland's representative to the Holy See is a 'non-resident ambassador', who is an ordinary resident of Dublin.
Italy	24 June 1929	See Holy See–Italy relations.
Lithuania	30 September 1991	The Holy See has a nunciature in Vilnius.; Lithuania has an embassy in Rome.; Pope Starts Lithuania Visit, First to an Ex-Soviet Land
Luxembourg	January 1891	See Apostolic Nunciature to Luxembourg.
Malta	15 December 1965	The Holy See has a nunciature in Rabat, Malta.; Malta has an embassy in Rome.; "Pope Arrives in Malta"
Monaco	21 June 1875	See Apostolic Nunciature to Monaco.
Netherlands	May 1829	See Apostolic Nunciature to the Netherlands.: The Holy See has a nunciature in The Hague.; The Netherlands has an embassy to the Holy See in Rome.
Poland	16 June 1919	See Holy See–Poland relations.: The Holy See has a nunciature in Warsaw.; Poland has an embassy to the Holy See in Rome.
Portugal	12 February 1481	See Holy See–Portugal relations. Portugal has one of the oldest relations with the Holy See; it received formal recognition as independent from Castile in 1179 and has always kept a strong relation with the Holy See following the maritime expansion and the Christianization of overseas territories. Relations suspended from 1640 to 1670, following the war against Spain (the Holy See did not recognise the Portuguese independence before the end of the war in 1668) and from 1911 to 1918 (following the proclamation of the Portuguese Republic in October 1910 and the approvation of the Law of Separation of the Church and the State). Concordats signed in 1940 and 2004.: The Holy See has a nunciature in Lisbon.; Portugal has an embassy in Rome.
Romania	10 May 1927	See Holy See–Romania relations.: The Holy See has an embassy in Bucharest.; Romania has an embassy to the Holy See.
Russia	9 December 2009	See Holy See–Russia relations.: Russia has an embassy in Rome accredited to the Holy See.; Holy See–Russia relations are largely linked to ecumenical relations with the Russian Orthodox Church.
Serbia	14 August 1970	See Holy See–Serbia relations.: The Holy See has an embassy in Belgrade.; Serbia has an embassy to the Holy See in Rome.; The Holy See's decision to withhold recognition of Kosovo has led to a warming of relations with Serbia, undoing the tension with Yugoslavia that followed the Holy See's relatively speedy recognition of Croatia's independence.
Spain	March 1559	See Holy See–Spain relations.: The Holy See has a nunciature in Madrid.; Spain has an embassy in Rome to the Holy See.
Switzerland	17 August 1586	See Holy See–Switzerland relations.: Holy See has a nunciature in Bern.; Switzerland has an embassy in Rome to the Holy See.
Ukraine	8 February 1992	In 1920, Pope Benedict XV sent an Apostolic visitor to Ukraine; The Holy See has a nunciature in Kyiv.; Ukraine has an embassy in Rome.; Pope's Ukraine visit in 2001 stirred protest.; Volodymyr Zelenskyy met with the Pope in Vatican in 2023.
United Kingdom	16 January 1982	See Holy See–United Kingdom relations British Prime Minister David Cameron with Pope Benedict XVI in 10 Downing Street, September 2010. The Holy See established diplomatic relations with the United Kingdom on 16 January 1982.: The Holy See maintains an apostolic nunciature in London.; The United Kingdom is accredited to the Holy See through its embassy in Rome. (Note: The British embassy to the Holy See is a separate embassy to the British embassy to Italy and San Marino.); Both countries share common membership of the Organization for Security and Co-operation in Europe.

=== Oceania ===
Country	Formal relations begun or resumed	Notes
Australia	24 March 1973	Since the establishment of diplomatic relations with the Holy See in 1973, Australia has maintained a non-resident Head of Mission, based in another European capital, as well as an office at the Holy See, headed by a Counsellor.; The Holy See has maintained an Apostolic Nunciature in Canberra since 1973.; On 21 July 2008, the Australian Government announced that it would appoint Tim Fischer as the first resident Ambassador to the Holy See. According to the Australian Foreign Ministry, this marked a significant deepening of Australia's relations with the Vatican since it would allow Australia to expand dialogue with the Vatican in areas including human rights, political and religious freedom, inter-faith dialogue, food security, arms control, refugees and anti-people trafficking, and climate change. Fischer commenced his appointment on 30 January 2009, and presented credentials to Pope Benedict XVI on 12 February 2009.; The Australian Prime Minister Kevin Rudd, visited Pope Benedict XVI and met the Vatican's Secretary of State on 9 July 2009.; The Australian Minister for Foreign Affairs Stephen Smith met Archbishop Dominique Mamberti, the Holy See's Secretary for Relations with States, on 3 December 2008, during his visit to Oslo to sign the Convention on Cluster Munitions. The Holy See played a facilitating role in relation to the Oslo process as a member of the Core Group of States.
New Zealand	20 June 1973	The Holy See has a nunciature in Wellington.; New Zealand is represented in the Holy See through its embassy in Madrid (Spain).; In 1984, Pope John Paul II gave a speech to the ambassador of New Zealand at the Holy See. He later visited the country in 1986.
Papua New Guinea	7 March 1977	See Holy See-Papua New Guinea relations.: In 1973, an Apostolic Delegation of Papua New Guinea (from Apostolic Delegation of Australia and Papua New Guinea) was created.; In 1976, a delegation was created as the Apostolic Delegation of Papua New Guinea and the Solomon Islands.; In 1977, the Vatican established the Apostolic Nunciature of Papua New Guinea and Apostolic Delegation of Solomon Islands. The Holy See established its Apostolic Nunciature in Port Moresby, the capital and largest city in Papua New Guinea.

== Multilateral politics ==
=== Participation in international organizations ===
The Holy See is active in international organizations and is a member of the following groups:

- International Committee of Military Medicine (ICMM)
- International Atomic Energy Agency (IAEA)
- International Organization for Migration (IOM)
- International Organization of Supreme Audit Institutions (INTOSAI)
- Organisation for the Prohibition of Chemical Weapons (OPCW)
- Organization for Security and Co-operation in Europe (OSCE)
- Preparatory Commission for the Comprehensive Test Ban Treaty Organization (CTBTO)
- International Institute for the Unification of Private Law (UNIDROIT)
- United Nations High Commissioner for Refugees (UNHCR)
- United Nations Conference on Trade and Development (UNCTAD)
- World Intellectual Property Organization (WIPO)

The Holy See has the status of permanent observer state in:

- United Nations (UN)
- World Health Organization (WHO)

The Holy See is also a permanent observer of the following international organizations:

- Council of Europe in Strasbourg
- International Labour Organization (ILO)
- International Fund for Agricultural Development (IFAD)
- International Commission on Civil Status (CIEC)
- Latin Union (LU)
- Organization of American States (OAS)
- Organisation of African Unity (OAU)
- United Nations
- UNESCO (United Nations Educational, Scientific and Cultural Organization)
- United Nations Industrial Development Organization (UNIDO)
- United Nations Development Programme (UNDP)
- United Nations Environment Programme (UNEP)
- United Nations International Drug Control Programme (UNDCP)
- United Nations Centre for Human Settlements (UNCHS)
- Food and Agriculture Organization (FAO)
- World Tourism Organization (WToO)
- World Trade Organization (WTO)
- World Food Programme (WFP)

The Holy See is an observer on an informal basis of the following groups:

- Asian-African Legal Consultative Organization (AALCO)
- International Decade for Natural Disaster Reduction (ISDR, 1990s)
- International Maritime Organization (IMO)
- International Civil Aviation Organization (ICAO)
- United Nations Committee on the Peaceful Uses of Outer Space (UNCOPUOS)
- World Meteorological Organization in Geneva (WMO)

The Holy See sends a delegate to the Arab League in Cairo. It is also a guest of honour to the Parliamentary Assembly of the Organization for Security and Cooperation in Europe.

=== Activities of the Holy See within the United Nations system ===
Since 6 April 1964, the Holy See has been a permanent observer state at the United Nations. In that capacity, the Holy See has since had a standing invitation to attend all the sessions of the United Nations General Assembly, the United Nations Security Council, and the United Nations Economic and Social Council to observe their work, and to maintain a permanent observer mission at the UN headquarters in New York. Accordingly, the Holy See has established a Permanent Observer Mission in New York, has sent representatives to all open meetings of the General Assembly and of its Main Committees, and has been able to influence their decisions and recommendations.

== Relationship with Vatican City ==
Although the Holy See is closely associated with Vatican City, the independent territory over which the Holy See is sovereign, the two entities are separate and distinct.

The State of the Vatican City was created by the Lateran Treaty in 1929 to "ensure the absolute and visible independence of the Holy See" and "to guarantee to it an indisputable sovereignty in international affairs" (quotations from the treaty). Archbishop Jean-Louis Tauran, the Holy See's former Secretary for Relations with States, said that the Vatican City is a "minuscule support-state that guarantees the spiritual freedom of the Pope with the minimum territory."

The Holy See, not Vatican City, maintains diplomatic relations with states, and foreign embassies are accredited to the Holy See, not to Vatican City State. It is the Holy See that establishes treaties and concordats with other sovereign entities and likewise, generally, it is the Holy See that participates in international organizations, with the exception of those dealing with technical matters of clearly territorial character, such as:

- European Conference of Postal and Telecommunications Administrations (CEPT)
- European Telecommunication Satellite Organization (EUTELSAT)
- International Grains Council (IGC)
- International Institute of Administrative Sciences (IISA)
- International Telecommunications Satellite Organization (ITSO)
- International Telecommunication Union (ITU)
- Interpol
- Universal Postal Union (UPU)

Under the terms of the Lateran Treaty, the Holy See has extraterritorial authority over various sites in Rome and two Italian sites outside of Rome, including the Pontifical Palace at Castel Gandolfo. The same authority is extended under international law over the Apostolic Nunciature of the Holy See in a foreign country.

== Diplomatic representations to the Holy See ==
Of the diplomatic missions accredited to the Holy See, 91 are situated in Rome. Those countries, if they also have an embassy to Italy, then have two embassies in the same city. This is due to the agreement between the Holy See and Italy, which established that the same person cannot at the same time be accredited to both. The United Kingdom recently housed its embassy to the Holy See in the same chancery as its embassy to the Italian Republic, a move that led to a diplomatic protest from the Holy See. An ambassador accredited to a country other than Italy can be accredited also to the Holy See. For example, the embassy of India in Bern, accredited to Switzerland and Liechtenstein, is also accredited to the Holy See, while the Holy See maintains an Apostolic Nunciature in New Delhi. For reasons of economy, smaller countries accredit to the Holy See a mission situated elsewhere and accredited also to the country of residence and perhaps other countries.

=== Rejection of ambassadorial candidates ===
It has been reported on several occasions that the Holy See will reject ambassadorial candidates whose personal lives are not in accordance with Catholic teachings. In 1973, the Vatican rejected the nomination of Dudley McCarthy as Australia's non-resident ambassador due to his status as a divorcee. According to press accounts in Argentina in January 2008, the country's nominee as ambassador, Alberto Iribarne, a Catholic, was rejected on the grounds that he was living with a woman other than the wife from whom he was divorced. In September 2008, French and Italian press reports likewise claimed that the Holy See had refused the approval of several French ambassadorial candidates, including a divorcee and an openly gay man.

Massimo Franco, author of Parallel Empires, asserted in April 2009 that the Obama administration had put forward three candidates for consideration for the position of United States Ambassador to the Holy See, but each of them had been deemed insufficiently anti-abortion by the Vatican. This claim was denied by the Holy See's spokesman Federico Lombardi, and was dismissed by former ambassador Thomas Patrick Melady as being in conflict with diplomatic practice. Vatican sources said that it is not the practice to vet the personal ideas of those who are proposed as ambassadors to the Holy See, though in the case of candidates who are Catholics and who are living with someone, their marital status is taken into account. Divorced people who are not Catholics can in fact be accepted, provided their marriage situation is in accord with the rules of their own religion.

== Treaties and concordats ==
Since the Holy See is legally capable of ratifying international treaties, and does ratify them, it has negotiated numerous bilateral treaties with states and it has been invited to participate – on equal footing with States – in the negotiation of most universal International law-making treaties. Traditionally, an agreement on religious matters between the Holy See of the Catholic Church and a sovereign state is called a concordat. This often includes both recognition and privileges for the Catholic Church in a particular country, such as exemptions from certain legal matters and processes, issues such as taxation, as well as the right of a state to influence the selection of bishops within its territory.

== See also ==
- Index of Vatican City-related articles
- Legal status of the Holy See
- Catholic Church and politics
- Relations between the Catholic Church and the state
- Catholic Church and ecumenism
