= Holy See–Oman relations =

- Vatican City: Oman

The Holy See and the Sultanate of Oman established full diplomatic relations on 23 February 2023.

== History ==
Oman is a predominantly Muslim country. At the time formal relations were established, Oman had four Catholic parishes and 12 priests.

With the establishment of relations with Oman, the Holy See has relations with every country on the Arabian Peninsula other than Saudi Arabia.

The Apostolic Nunciature to the Sultanate of Oman is the ecclesiastical office of the Catholic Church and the diplomatic post of the Holy See in Oman established in February 2023.

== See also ==
- Foreign relations of the Holy See
- Foreign relations of Oman
- Catholic Church in Oman
