= Holy See–Papua New Guinea relations =

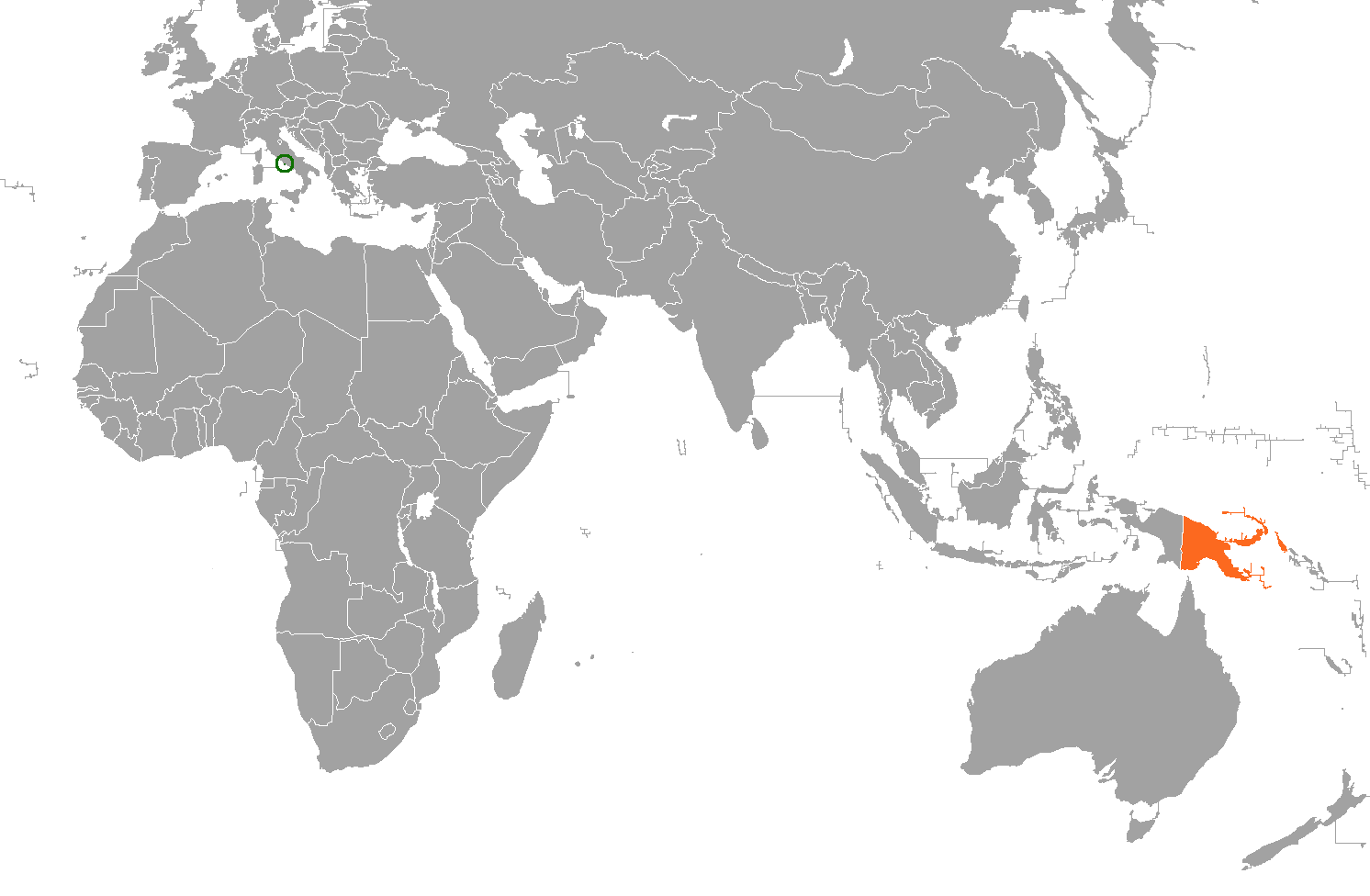
- Holy See: Papua New Guinea

The Holy See and Papua New Guinea officially established diplomatic relations with each other in 1977. Diplomatic relations between the two in which Papua New Guinea did not act independently had previously been established through the Holy See's Apostolic Delegation of Australia and Papua New Guinea in 1973, and Apostolic Delegation of Papua New Guinea and The Solomon Islands in 1976. Two popes – Pope John Paul II and Pope Francis – have visited Papua New Guinea.

== History ==
The first relations of diplomatic character between the two were established in 1947, when the Apostolic Delegation of Australia, New Zealand and Oceania was created. It was branched in 1968 and became the Apostolic Delegation of Australia and Papua New Guinea. In 1976, new delegations were created and Papua New Guinea was branched into the jurisdiction of the Apostolic Delegation of Papua New Guinea and The Solomon Islands. On 7 March 1977, the Holy See branched the delegation, forming the Apostolic Nunciature of Papua New Guinea and the Apostolic Delegation of Solomon Islands. This decision henceforth allowed Papua New Guinea to engage with the Holy See in its own right. The Holy See established its Apostolic Nunciature in Port Moresby, the capital and largest city of Papua New Guinea.

In May 1984, Pope John Paul II made a visit of pilgrimage to Papua New Guinea and the Solomon Islands.

Pope Francis visited Papua New Guinea from 6 to 9 September 2024, as part of his tour of the Indonesian archipelago. He celebrated a mass in Port Morseby, which was attended by an estimated 35,000 people. He then made a stop at Vanimo, in the country's remote northwest.

The incumbent nuncio to Papua New Guinea and the Solomon Islands is Archbishop Maurizio Bravi, who was appointed on 15 January 2025 to replace Archbishop Mauro Lalli.

== See also ==
- Foreign relations of the Holy See
