= Holy See–Vietnam relations =

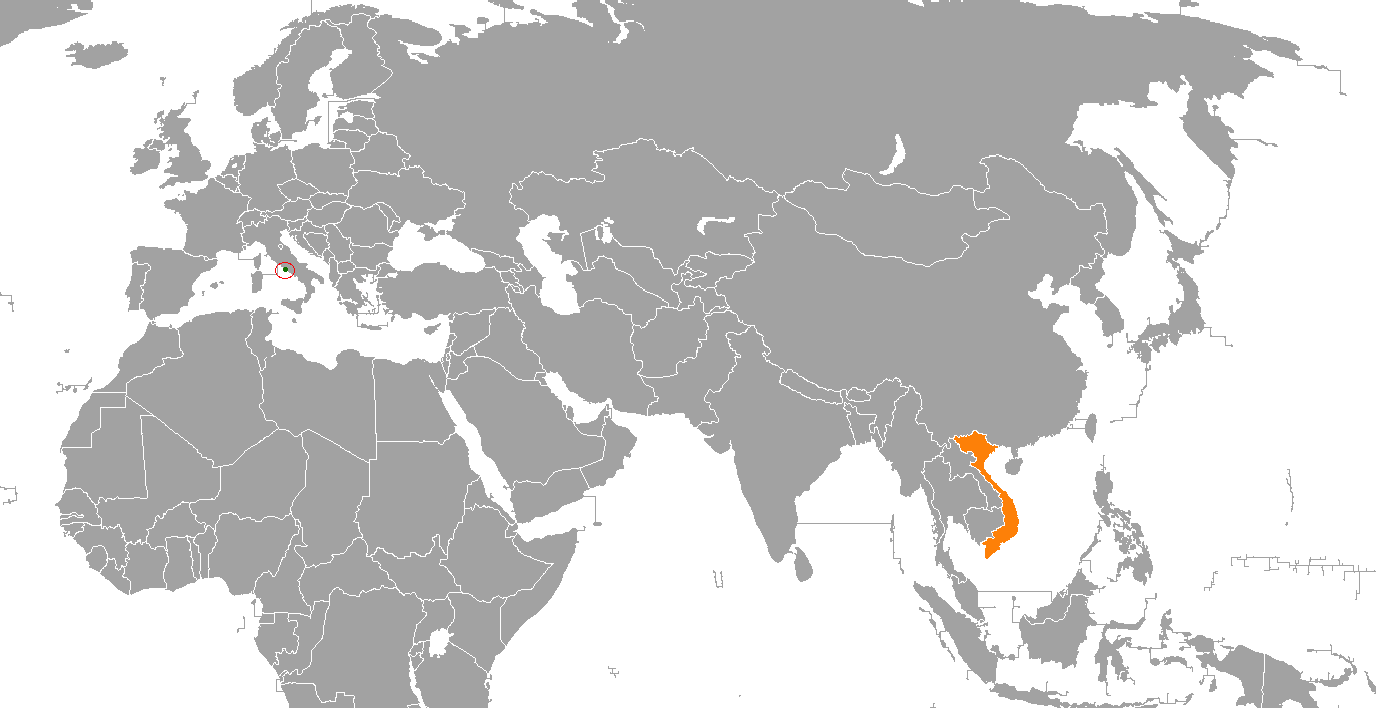
- Holy See: Vietnam

Holy See–Vietnam relations are foreign relations between the Holy See and Vietnam.

== History ==
The two countries only maintain unofficial relations and dialogue, but the historical presence of Christianity in Vietnam has a relatively long history. The first Catholic missionary to Vietnam started at the 15th century. Christian presence became more frequent in the 16th century, with the arrival of French, Polish and Portuguese Jesuits. The Polish Jesuit, Wojciech Męciński, was the first ever Catholic to record the existence of Vietnam and Vietnamese culture.

Catholic missions in Vietnam continued uninterrupted, but the most influential to make impact on the rise of Christian Church was Frenchman Alexandre de Rhodes. Father Alexandre had helped spreading Christianity, especially Catholicism in Vietnam; but the most was the creation of Vietnamese alphabet, called "Quốc Ngữ", which would be used in Vietnam since the 20th century. Under the era of the North's Trịnh lords and the South's Nguyễn lords, Christianity was viewed with skepticism in both, though the Trịnh lords were more hostile than its southern rival and had expelled Christians from the country. The Nguyễn lords, while not too opening either, seen to be more Christian-friendly than the Trịnh lords and Christianity became more widespread, resulted with the larger Christian population in the south than the north today.

The Tây Sơn dynasty, founded after reunited Vietnam, began a level of persecution, though became even more serious under Emperor Cảnh Thịnh, who issued massacre on Christians. Under the circumstance of oppression, Christians sought refuge in La Vang, where they reported about the Marian apparition in the same place, known today as Our Lady of La Vang. Pope John Paul II had acknowledged the importance of La Vang and expressed desire to rebuild the Catholic Church, ruined during the Vietnam War.

With the ascend of Emperor Gia Long, who founded the Nguyễn dynasty, Christianity in Vietnam witnessed a resurgence. Gia Long had a long-standing friendly toward Christians, owning by the debt from Pigneau de Béhaine, a French Bishop who helped organize the anti-Tây Sơn force to finally retake Vietnam from the opponent. Emperor Gia Long's friendliness with Christians built up the stronger Christian influence in the country. However, after Gia Long's death, Emperor Minh Mạng returned to traditional persecution of Christians, revoked many of his father's policies. The persecution only stopped when Cochinchina Campaign and French conquest forced Emperor Tự Đức to accept the presence of Christians.

Before the independence of Vietnam there already existed, since 1925, an Apostolic Delegation (a non-diplomatic mission accredited to the Catholic Church in the area) for Indochina, based in Hanoi. After the expulsion of its staff by the North Vietnamese authorities, the headquarters of the Apostolic Delegation was moved to Saigon in 1957. In 1964, responsibility for relations with the Church in Laos was transferred to the Apostolic Delegation in Bangkok and the Saigon-based mission was renamed Apostolic Delegation for Vietnam and Cambodia.

Cambodia and the Holy See established diplomatic relations in 1994 and the name of the Apostolic Delegation was again changed, this time to Apostolic Delegation for Vietnam. Meanwhile, with the end of the Vietnam War, the Apostolic Delegate was forced to leave. Since an apostolic delegation, unlike an embassy, is not a bilateral institution with involvement by the State, the Apostolic Delegation for Vietnam has not been suppressed, but has remained inactive since 1975.

Temporary missions from the Holy See to discuss with the Government matters of common interest are sent every year or two, and there has been at least one visit to the Vatican by a Vietnamese mission.

== Present ==
Prime Minister Nguyễn Tấn Dũng and Pope Benedict XVI met at the Vatican on 25 January 2007 in a "new and important step towards establishing diplomatic ties". The first meeting of the Vietnam-Holy See Joint Working Group was convened in Hanoi from 16 to 17 February 2009. The Pope met with President Nguyễn Minh Triết on 11 December 2009. Vatican officials called the meeting "a significant stage in the progress of bilateral relations with Vietnam." The Vietnam–Holy See Joint Working Group met for a second time in June 2010.

On 13 January 2011, the Holy See appointed its first diplomatic representative, formally a "non-resident representative to Vietnam"; Archbishop Leopoldo Girelli was the first to hold the post while also serving as Apostolic Nuncio to Singapore and Apostolic Delegate to Malaysia. He left these positions in 2017.

=== Normalization process ===
There have been meetings between leaders of Vietnam and the Vatican, including a visit by Vietnam's Prime Minister Nguyễn Tấn Dũng to the Vatican to meet Pope Benedict XVI on 25 January 2007. Official Vatican delegations have been traveling to Vietnam almost every year since 1990 for meetings with its government authorities and to visit Catholic dioceses. In March 2007, a Vatican delegation visited Vietnam and met with local officials. In October 2014, Pope Francis met with Prime Minister Nguyễn Tấn Dũng in Rome. The sides continued discussions about the possibility of establishing normal diplomatic relations, but have not provided a specific schedule for the exchange of ambassadors. The Pope would again meet Vietnamese leader Trần Đại Quang and his associates in the Vatican in 2016.

Vietnam remains the only Asian communist country to have an unofficial representative of the Vatican in the country and has held both official and unofficial meetings with the Vatican's representatives both in Vietnam and the Holy See, which is not the case in China, North Korea, and Laos, due to long and historical relations between Vietnam and the Catholic Church. This relationship has continued to improve, when the Holy See announced they would have a permanent representative in Vietnam in 2018. Although it has yet to establish an official embassy and full ambassador, it was hailed as a major improvement. On 27 July 2023, Vietnam announced that would allow the Vatican to establish a Resident Papal Representative in Hanoi, which is seen as moving closer to establishing formal diplomatic relations.

On 23 December 2023, Pope Francis named Archbishop Marek Zalewski to serve as the first Resident Papal Representative in Vietnam.

On 30 June 2025, Pope Leo XIV met with Vice President Võ Thị Ánh Xuân to discuss growing Holy See–Vietnam relations. On 11 April 2026, National Assembly Chairman Trần Thanh Mẫn met with the Pope, inviting the Pope to visit Vietnam in the near future.

== See also ==
- Foreign relations of the Holy See
- Foreign relations of Vietnam
- Religion in Vietnam
