= Holy See–Switzerland relations =

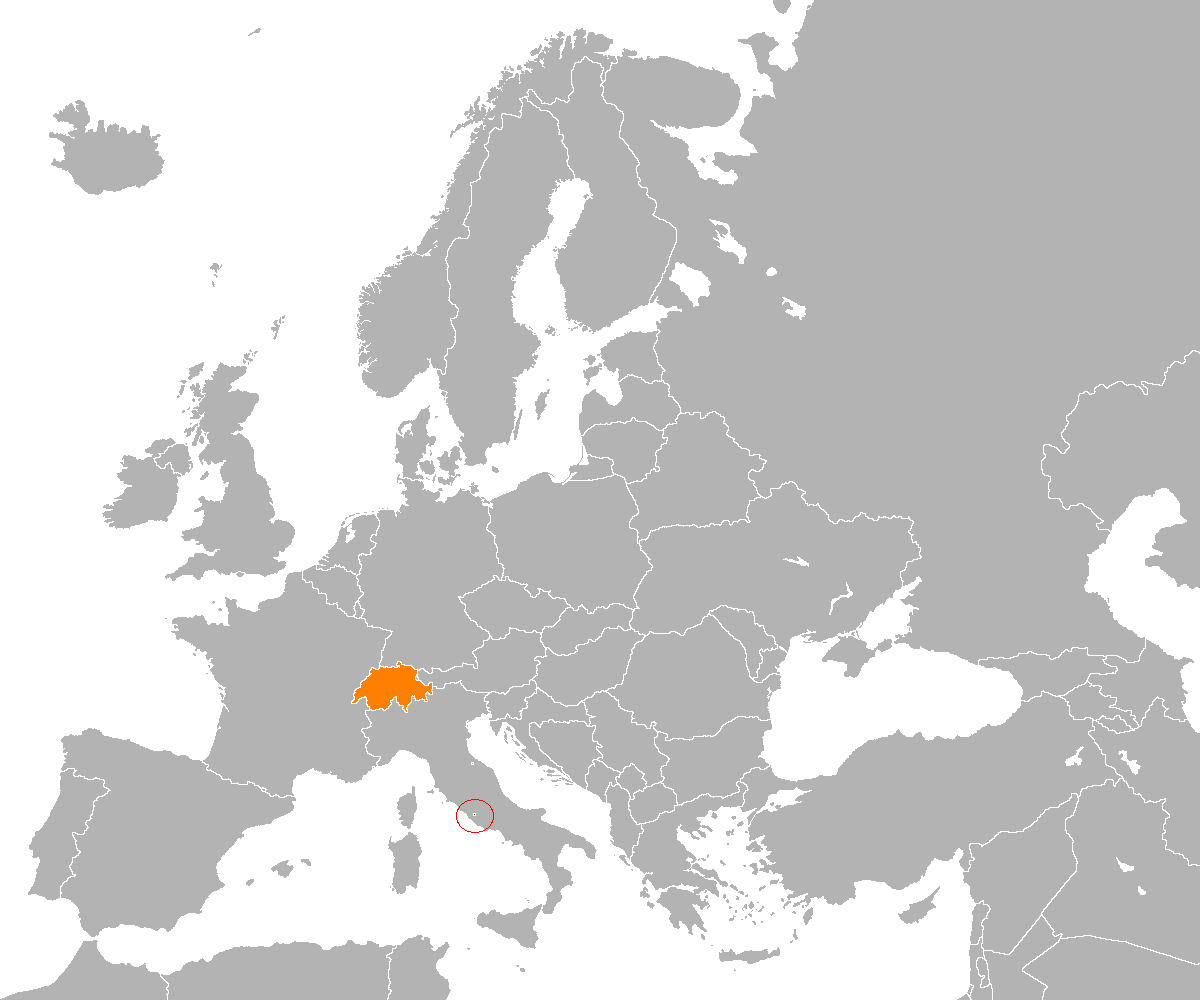
- Holy See: Switzerland

Holy See – Switzerland relations are among the oldest bilateral diplomatic relations, beginning with the admission of a papal nuncio to Lucerne in 1586. About 40% of the Swiss population are Catholics, and young Swiss men have served for centuries in the Pontifical Swiss Guard.

The two states have close diplomatic relations and share goals such as peace, sustainable development, and human rights. Each has a diplomatic mission in the other country. They also work together on education, cultural exchange, and humanitarian aid. Their relationship also includes dialogue between academic institutions and collaboration on international initiatives.

== History ==
The bilateral relationship became lastingly fraught during the second half of the 19th century, after the modern Swiss state emerged from a civil war in which the mostly liberal and Protestant cantons defeated the Sonderbund, an alliance of conservative and Catholic cantons that had enjoyed the strong support of the Holy See. In 1873, at the height of the Kulturkampf, the Swiss Federal Council ordered the papal nuncio to leave Switzerland, ending diplomatic relations for about 50 years. The Catholic foreign minister Giuseppe Motta was eventually able to convince his colleagues to allow the return of a nuncio to Bern.

Switzerland, however, remained without diplomatic representation with the Holy See until 1991, when the government appointed a non-resident special envoy, which it upgraded to ambassadorial status in 2004. In May 2022, Switzerland opened its first resident embassy to the Holy See in Rome.

== Pontifical Swiss Guard ==
The Pontifical Swiss Guard has served as the personal protection unit of the Pope since 1506. Recruits are young Swiss men who wear the Guard’s traditional Renaissance uniform and receive modern training in personal security. Their service combines religious commitment with exposure to Italian language and culture during their time in Vatican City.

== See also ==
- Concordat
- Foreign relations of the Holy See
- Apostolic Nunciature to Switzerland: lists Apostolic Nuncios appointed to Switzerland since 1517
- Index of Vatican City-related articles
