= Holy See–Nepal relations =

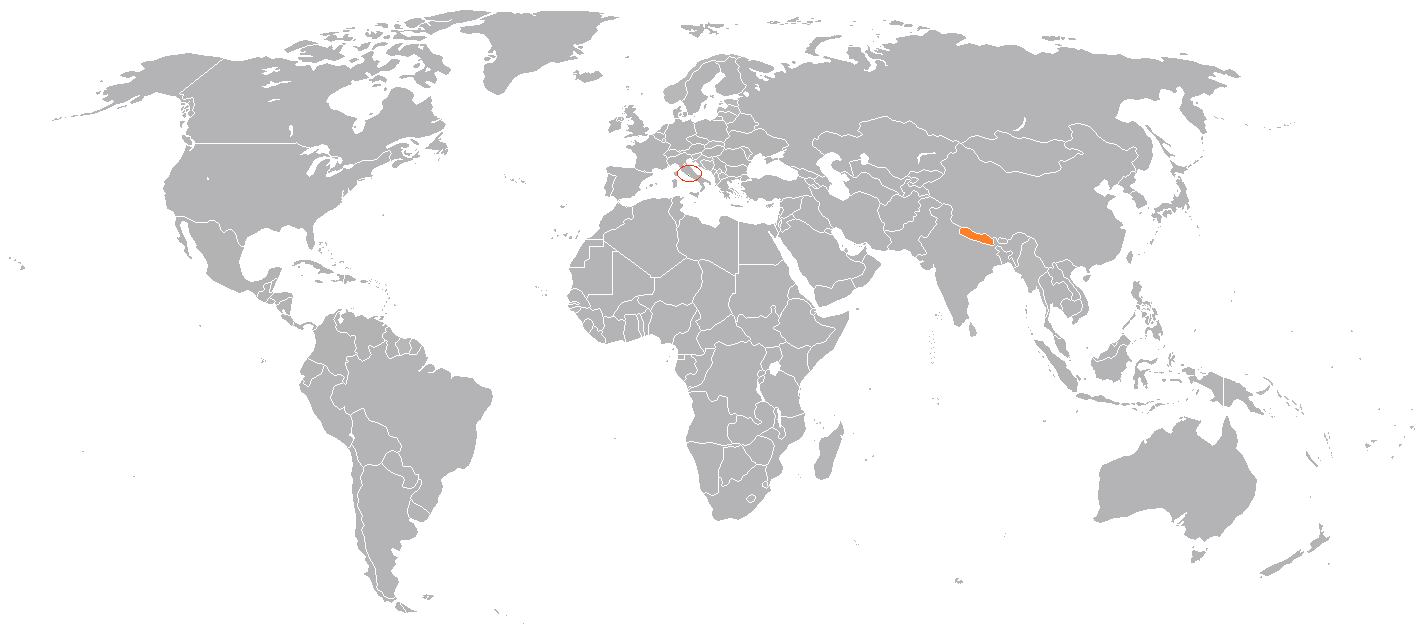
- Holy See: Nepal

Holy See–Nepal relations are foreign relations between the Holy See and Nepal. Both countries established diplomatic relations in 1985. The Holy See has an Apostolic nunciature in the country. The Nepalese embassy in Berlin is accredited as non-residential embassy for the Holy See. As of May 2017, Ramesh Prasad Khanal was the ambassador of Nepal to the Holy See. As of November 2013, Archbishop Salvatore Pennacchio is the Apostolic Nuncio to Nepal. He is also the Nuncio to India and is resident in India.

== See also ==
- Foreign relations of the Holy See
- Foreign relations of Nepal
