= Central African Republic–Holy See relations =

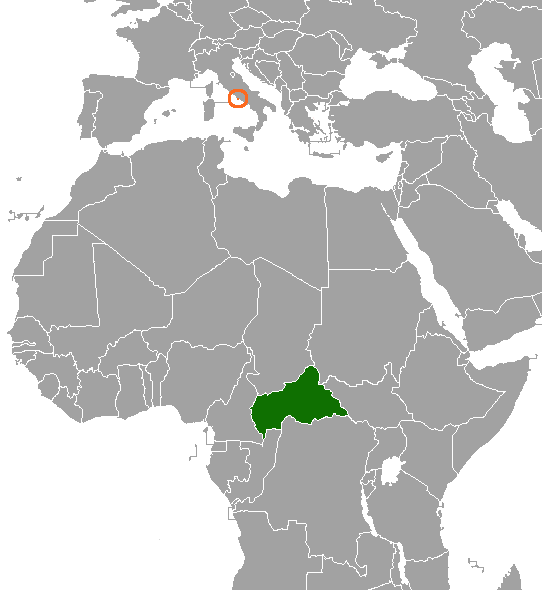
- Central African Republic: Holy See

Central African Republic–Holy See relations refers to the current and historic relationship between the Central African Republic and the Holy See. Diplomatic relations between the two states were established in 1967, but only in recent years they have been increasing their cooperation, with high level visits being made by Pope Francis and President Faustin-Archange Touadéra to each other's countries.

The Holy See maintains an apostolic nunciature in Bangui, while the Central African Republic has no diplomatic representation to Vatican City. The most recent apostolic nuncio of the Holy See in CAR was Archbishop Franco Coppola (2014–2016), but he was reassigned in the summer of 2016 and currently the position is vacant. Another notable former apostolic nuncio to CAR is Joseph Chennoth (1999–2005).

== History ==
Diplomatic relations between the two countries were first established in May 1967.

== Official visits ==
Pope Francis made a visit to the Central African Republic in November 2015 and encouraged the country's process of national reconciliation, amidst the civil war that has been going on there. He was greeted by crowds and a celebration took place in Bangui, as the Pope urged both Christian and Muslim militants to lay down their arms. Pope Francis met with interim President Catherine Samba-Panza during his visit. After being elected President of the Central African Republic, Faustin-Archange Touadéra visited Vatican City as his first international trip, in April 2016. He thanked the Pope for visiting their country at a difficult period in its history and stated that with the peaceful 2015–16 general elections and the ongoing process of demobilizing militias, the country is on the path to recovery.

== Bilateral agreements ==
A Framework Agreement was signed on 6 September 2016 between CAR and the Holy See at the presidential palace in Bangui, with Charles-Armel Doubane, Minister of Foreign Affairs and African Integration signing on the behalf of the former, and Archbishop Franco Coppola signing on behalf of the latter. The signing was done in the presence of President Faustin-Archange Touadéra. The agreement consists of 21 articles and establishes relations between the Catholic Church and the state, as well as areas of mutual interest for cooperation between them.

== See also ==
- Catholic Church in the Central African Republic
- Foreign relations of the Holy See
- Foreign relations of the Central African Republic
- Religion in the Central African Republic
