= Holy See–Turkey relations =

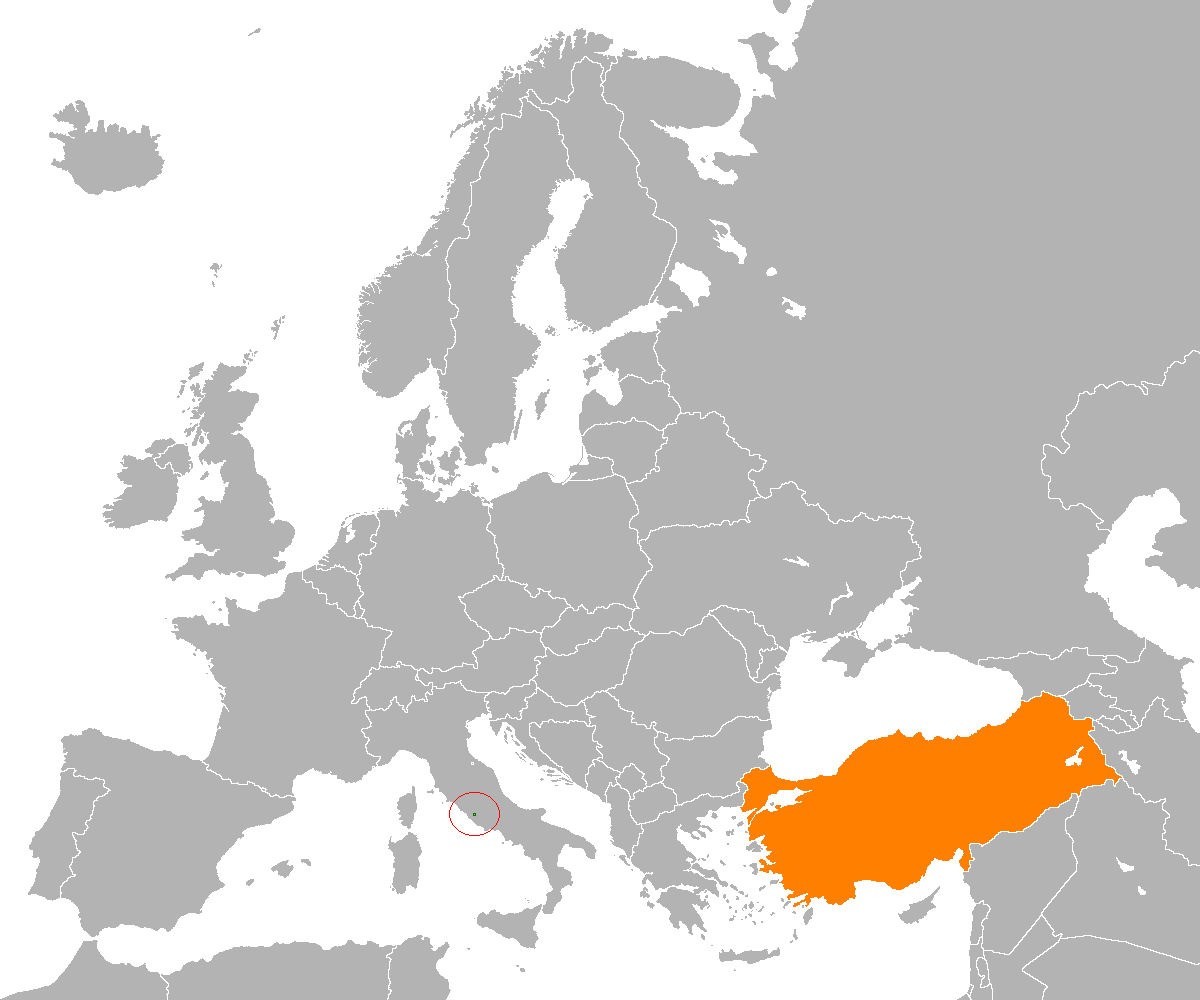
- Holy See: Turkey

Holy See–Turkey relations are foreign relations between the Holy See and Turkey. Both countries established diplomatic relations in 1868, originally between the Holy See and the Ottoman Empire. The Holy See has a nunciature in Ankara. Turkey has an embassy in Rome.

== History ==
=== Ottoman Empire ===
The Holy See allied with the Ottoman Empire during the Italian War of 1551–1559, where Pope Paul IV searched the support of the Ottoman Empire against Holy Roman Emperor Charles V. After tying an alliance with Henry II of France in 1555, the Pope proposed that the Franco-Ottoman fleet attacked the Emperor's Italian territories should the war draw near the Papal States. To this end, he even communicated with Sultan Suleiman the Magnificent through his cardinal-nephew, Cardinal Carlo Carafa. The Pope even contemplated launching a crusade with Ottoman assistance against the House of Habsburg. After entering the war, he called again for an Ottoman attack against Naples and Sicily.

Otherwise Holy See has a history of difficult relations with the Ottoman Empire. Their European allies defeated the Ottomans at the naval battle of Lepanto in 1571 and the battle of Vienna in 1683. The Holy See did maintain positive relations with Armenia, even when it was under Ottoman rule. It was also involved in the Balkans and Greece at a time when nationalities were emancipating themselves from Turkish domination.

=== Atatürk revolution ===
The Atatürk revolution did not really ease relations, since it led to the suppression of the millet system, which had previously guaranteed the rights of Christian minorities that were split in Byzantine, Latin, Armenian, Syriac and Greek-Melkite ethnic lines. This is in turn led to the assimilation of Turkey's Christian population into ethnic Turkish traditions and customs. Also, the Kemalist ideology was closely related to anticlericalism in France, a French republican ideology which had been hostile to the Church in Western Europe.

=== Papal visits ===
Pope Paul VI visited Turkey in July 1967. During his visit he met with Eastern Orthodox Patriarch Athenagoras I of Constantinople, Shenork I Kaloustian, Armenian Patriarch of Constantinople as well as members of the Muslim and Jewish communities.

Pope John Paul II visited Turkey in November 1979. He met with Patriarch Dimitrios I of Constantinople and Armenian Patriarch Shenork I as well as celebrating the Eucharist in Ephesus.

In 2006, Pope Benedict XVI visited Turkey and its famous Blue Mosque. It was only the second time a sitting Pope was known to have entered a mosque and was part of his efforts to mend Muslim-Christian relations, but was overshadowed by the controversy surrounding a lecture at Regensburg which was interpreted by some as an attempt to link Islam and violence. He was met with 25,000 nationalist and Islamist protesters when he arrived at Ankara.

In 2025, the Holy See announced that Pope Leo XIV would visit Turkey in November of the same year, primarily to participate in events surrounding the 1700th anniversary of the First Council of Nicaea.

=== Visits to Vatican ===
Turkish president Celal Bayar visited the Vatican on 11 July 1959 and met with Pope John XXIII.

Turkish president Recep Tayyip Erdoğan visited the Vatican in February 2018 and had a meeting with Pope Francis at the Apostolic Palace.

== Religious issues ==
The Holy See has maintained positive relations with the Ecumenical Patriarch of Constantinople since the 1960s. The Ecumenical Patriarch who is based in current day İstanbul is not recognized as leader of the Eastern Orthodox by the Turkish government, which prefers to regard him as a local bishop. This non-recognition of the Patriarch is an issue in Holy See–Turkey relations.

The Church has also sought to have improved legal recognition of itself under Turkish law, which at present makes it difficult for Catholic bishops to be legally recognized in their exercise of Apostolic ministry, while at times the ownership of churches is put into question. Similar problems have come up with the Greek Patriarchate, whose seminary training was shut down by the Turkish state.

== Armenian genocide ==
In 2000, John Paul II officially recognized the Armenian genocide, an opposing position to that of the Turkish government which has deployed much of its political energies in having the events in Armenia remain unrecognized by the international community. On 12 April 2015, Pope Francis used the term 'genocide' to refer to mass killings of Armenians by the Ottoman government. In response, Turkey recalled its ambassador to the Vatican for "consultations" just hours after Francis' comments, and summoned the ambassador from the Vatican for a meeting. Also, on June 24, 2016, Pope Francis in another speech described the killing of Armenians as a genocide. In addition, the Vatican spokesman Federico Lombardi, told the reporters that "There is no reason not to use this word in this case," "The reality is clear and we never denied what the reality is." Turkey condemned the declaration as “very unfortunate” and also said that it bore traces of “the mentality of the Crusades.”

== EU membership ==
The Holy See has not taken a strong position on EU membership for Turkey, although Cardinal Joseph Ratzinger was said to be hostile to it in a book he published before becoming Pope, and felt that Turkey should instead focus on relations with nearby Middle Eastern states. However, during his 2006 trip to Turkey as Pope Benedict XVI, he came out in support of Turkey's EU membership. Tarcisio Bertone, the Holy See's Secretary of State, has voiced the opinions of the Apostolic See on these matters.

== Tourism and pilgrimages ==
Relations exist between the Holy See and Turkey on the basis of tourism and pilgrimages. In the 2008-2009 Year of Saint-Paul, an agreement was reached between the two states in order to promote pilgrimages to Tarsus, the place that the apostle Paul was born. Other important pilgrimage sites include Selçuk, the old city of Istanbul, İznik (Nicaea), Bergama, İzmir (Smyrna), Manisa and Trabzon.

== See also ==
- Foreign relations of the Holy See
- Foreign relations of Turkey
