= Democratic Republic of the Congo–Holy See relations =

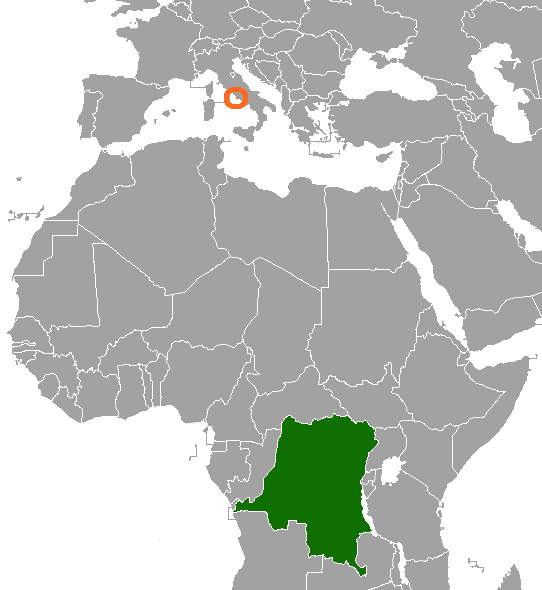
- DR Congo: Holy See

Democratic Republic of the Congo–Holy See relations refers to the bilateral relations between the Democratic Republic of the Congo and the Holy See. The two states have seen an increase in their cooperation in recent years, and due to the large number of Roman Catholics in the DRC, President Joseph Kabila has made an effort to maintain good relations with the Vatican.

The DRC maintains an embassy near Vatican City while the Holy See has an apostolic nunciature in Kinshasa. The current Congolese ambassador in the Vatican is Jean-Pierre Hamuli Mupenda (since 2010), while the Vatican's Apostolic Nuncio in the DRC is Archbishop Luis Mariano Montemayor (since 2015).

== History ==
Diplomatic relations between the two states were established in January 1977. About half of the population of DR Congo is Roman Catholic, being the single largest religious group in the country, and thus the Congolese Catholic Church is considered to have a large influence. It has received support from outside sources, most notably the Holy See. While accepting Ambassador Mupenda's accreditation in April 2010, Pope Benedict XVI spoke about the Kivu conflict, saying that he hoped the state of war would soon end and that a national reconciliation process could take place. He also talked about the increase in relations between the Holy See and DR Congo.

== Bilateral agreements ==
In May 2016, the governments of the DRC and the Vatican signed an agreement regarding matters of common interest, consisting of 21 articles. Those included the institutions of Catholic education, teaching of religion in schools, welfare and charitable activities of the Church, pastoral care in the armed forces and prison and hospital institutions, as well as property tax and the obtaining of entry visas and residence permits for religious personnel. The document also establishes the legal position of the Catholic Church in the civil sphere of the country, and so the liberty of the Church to apostolic activity and regulate matters within its own competence.

== State visits ==
On 26 September 2016, President Kabila visited Vatican City and met with Archbishop Paul Richard Gallagher, Secretary for Relations with States of the Holy See. They discussed the close relations between the DRC and the Vatican and the role of the Church plays in the large Congolese Catholic population, as well as the necessity for a peaceful resolution to the recent political turmoil that has occurred in the country regarding the 2017 general election.

== See also ==
- Catholic Church in the Democratic Republic of the Congo
- Foreign relations of the Holy See
- Foreign relations of the Democratic Republic of the Congo
- Religion in the Democratic Republic of the Congo
