= Holy See–Republic of the Congo relations =

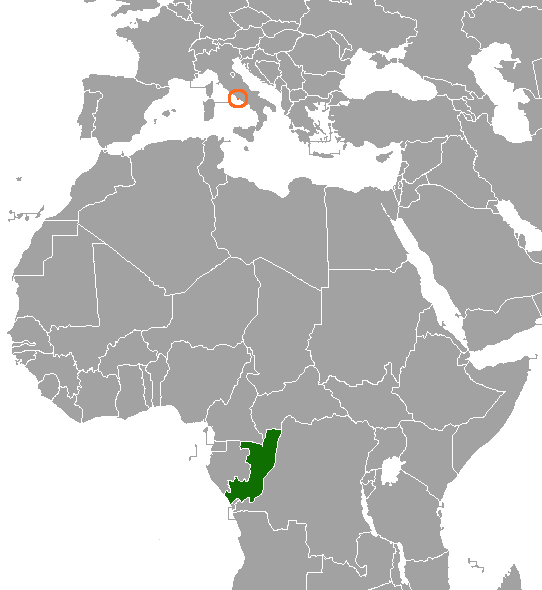
- Congo: Holy See

Holy See–Republic of the Congo relations refers to the bilateral relations between the Republic of the Congo and the Holy See. The Catholic Church has considerable influence in the Republic of the Congo as about half of the population identify as Roman Catholic. Although the two states established relations in February 1963, their cooperation has only started to increase recently, with their first major bilateral agreement being signed in early 2017.

The Holy See maintains an apostolic nunciature in Brazzaville, while Congo does not yet have any diplomatic or consular mission to Vatican City. It is instead represented by its Ambassador to France, who is accredited to several other countries, including the Holy See. The Vatican's current Apostolic Nuncio to Congo is Francisco Escalante Molina, while the Ambassador of the Republic of the Congo to France is Henri Lopès, who was accredited to the Vatican in 2000.

== Bilateral agreements ==
In February 2017, the two states signed an agreement that confirms the status of the Catholic Church and other Catholic institutions in Congo, as well as the right of the Church to carry out its mission in the country. Cardinal Pietro Parolin, the Vatican's Secretary of State, and Prime Minister Clément Mouamba of Congo were present at the signing of the agreement, as were a number of high-ranking government and religious officials.

== Official visits ==
Cardinal Peitro Parolin visited Brazzaville for the signing of the bilateral agreement, as part of his African tour.

== See also ==
- Catholic Church in the Republic of the Congo
- Foreign relations of the Holy See
- Foreign relations of the Republic of the Congo
- Religion in the Republic of the Congo
