= Jean-Pierre Hamuli Mupenda =

Congolese diplomat

Jean-Pierre Hamuli Mupenda is a Congolese diplomat who is the current Ambassador of the Democratic Republic of the Congo to the Holy See. He presented his credentials to Pope Benedict XVI on April 29, 2010, and spoke with the Pope regarding the political situation in the country and the national reconciliation process. In May 2016, he attended a negotiation in which the DRC signed a major bilateral agreement with the Holy See, which covered the status of the Catholic Church and other Catholic institutions in the country, as well as improved bilateral cooperation.
