= Brazil–Holy See relations =

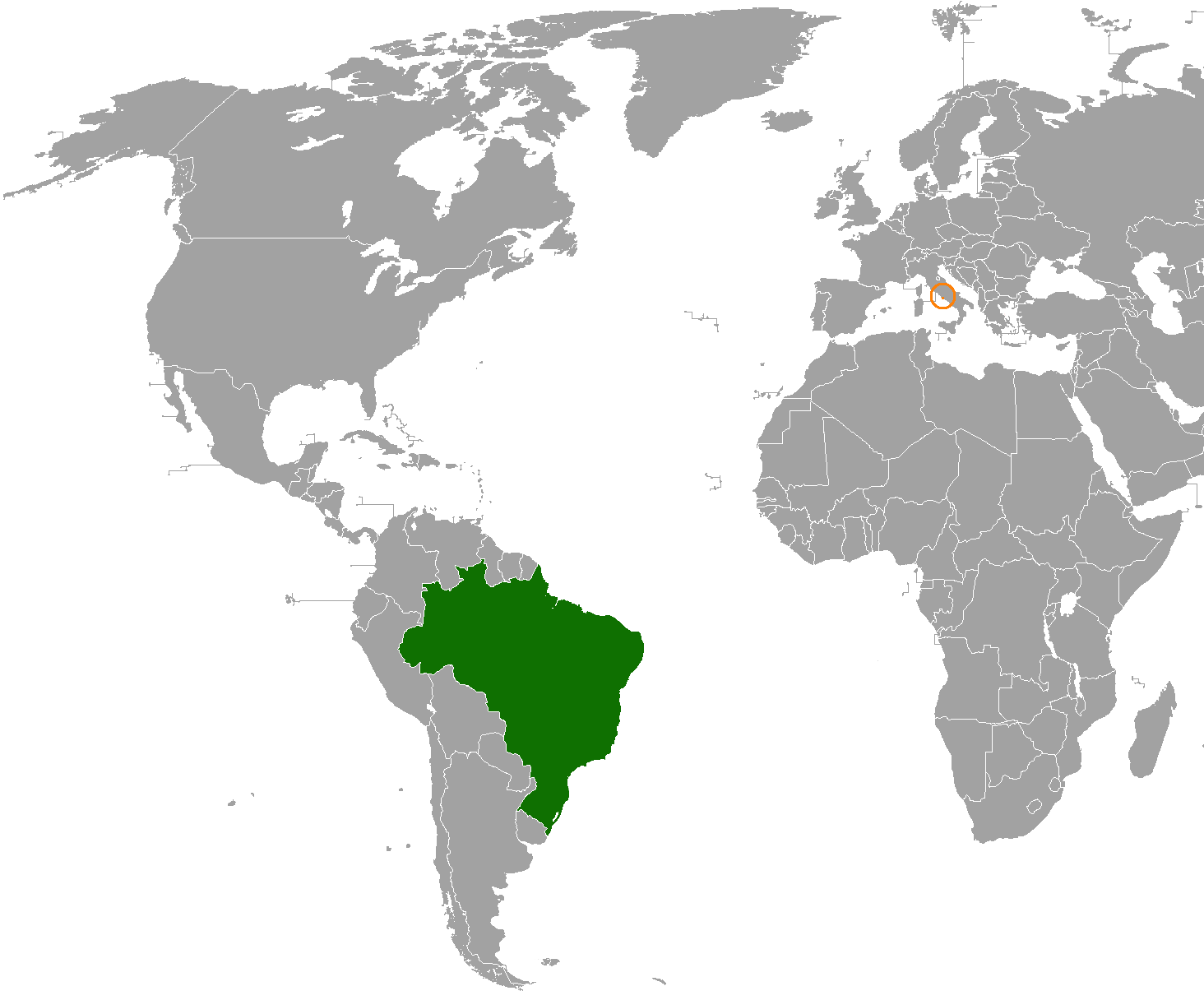
- Brazil: Holy See

Brazil–Holy See relations are the current and historical relations between Brazil and the Holy See. Catholicism was introduced in Brazil in 1500 by the Portuguese Empire, and it is the country's predominant faith. Brazil also has the world's largest Catholic population. Since the adoption of the Constitution in 1891, Brazil is a secular nation.

== History ==
Soon after Brazil declared its independence in 1822, Brazil and the Holy See have maintained diplomatic relations. In 1826, the first Brazilian envoy to the Papal court arrived in Rome. The Brazilian embassy to the Holy See is among the oldest Brazilian diplomatic representations abroad. In November 1871, Emperor Pedro II of Brazil paid a visit to the Vatican and met with Pope Pius IX.

In 1872, a crisis between both nations ensued with regards to the Religious Question when the Brazilian Imperial government wanted to reform the church and appointed a series of reforming bishops. In 1891, Brazil became a secular nation with the adoption of a Republican Constitution. In 1919, the Brazilian representation to the Holy See was elevated to the category of an embassy.

In June 1980, Pope John Paul II became the first Pope to visit Brazil and he toured the nation for two weeks. In 1986, Brazilian President José Sarney became the first Brazilian President to visit the Vatican. Since the initial visits, there would be several more Papal and Presidential visits between both nations.

In November 2008, during Brazilian President Luiz Inácio Lula da Silva second visit to the Vatican, an agreement was signed between both nations on the Legal Statute of the Catholic Church in Brazil, which consolidates rules for the Church's activities in the country. The main objective of the agreement is to give Brazil's relations with the Holy See enhanced legal certainty, always in accordance with the state's secular principle. The agreement has been in force since 2010.

In 2013, Brazilian President Dilma Rousseff paid a visit to the Vatican to attend the inauguration of Pope Francis, the first Latin and South American Pope. In July 2013, Pope Francis paid a 5-day visit to Brazil, his first Papal voyage after becoming Pope in March 2013. In February 2014, President Rousseff paid a second visit to the Vatican.

In 2023, President Luiz Inácio Lula da Silva met with Pope Francis at the Vatican. In April 2025, President Lula da Silva attended the funeral for Pope Francis at the Vatican.

== High-level visits ==
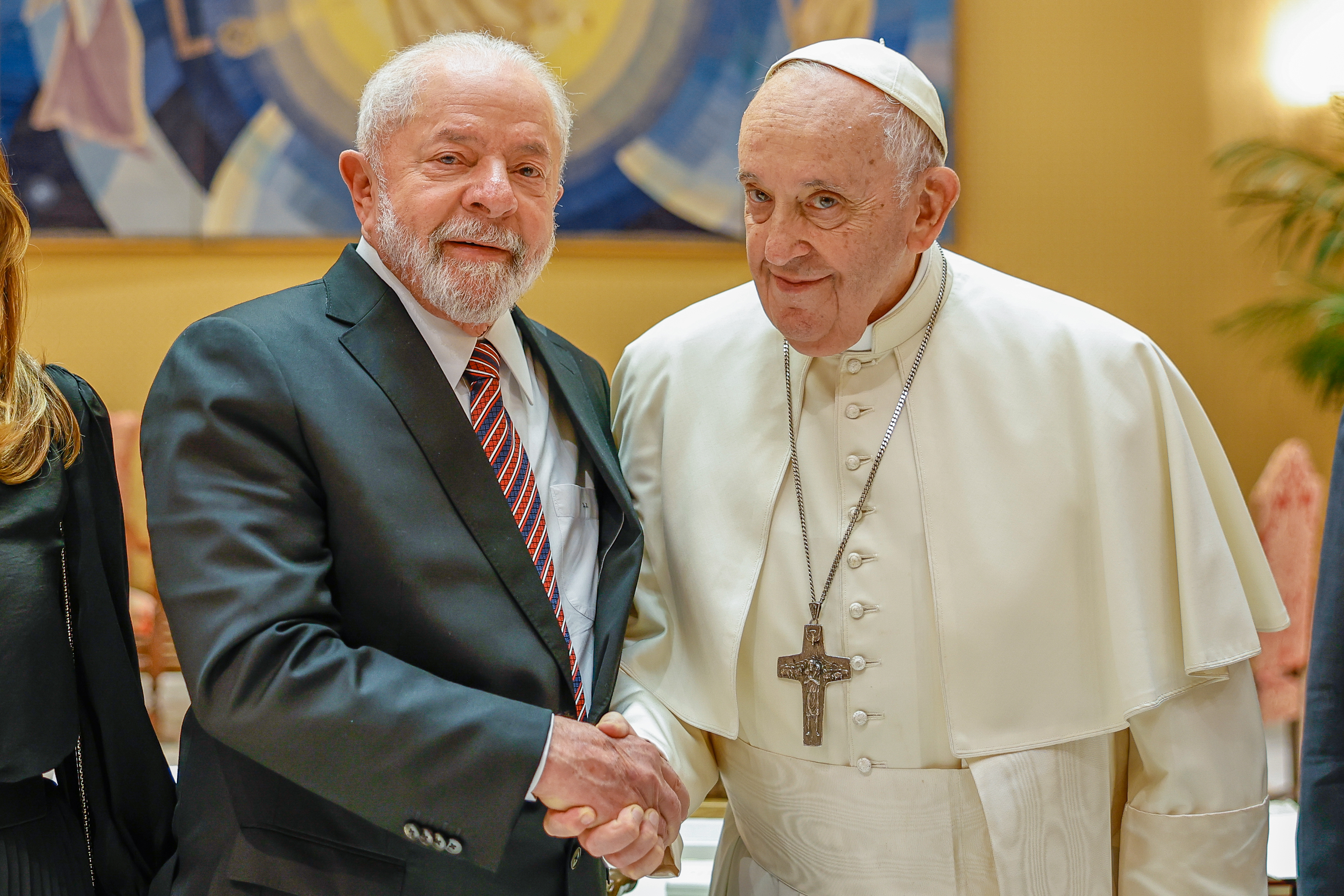
Brazilian President Lula da Silva and Pope Francis at the Vatican; June 2023.

High-level visits from Brazil to the Holy See

- Emperor Pedro II of Brazil (1871)
- President José Sarney (1986)
- President Fernando Collor de Mello (1990)
- President Fernando Henrique Cardoso (1997)
- President Luiz Inácio Lula da Silva (2005, 2008, 2023, 2025)
- Foreign Minister Antonio Patriota (2012)
- President Dilma Rousseff (2013, 2014)
- Vice President Michel Temer (2014)

Papal visits from the Holy See to Brazil

- Pope John Paul II (1980, 1982, 1991, 1997)
- Pope Benedict XVI (2007)
- Pope Francis (2013)

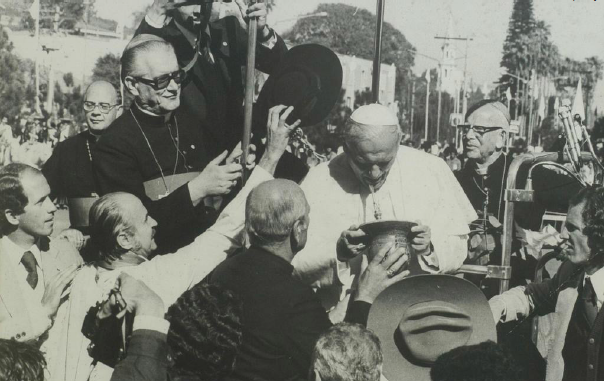
Pope John Paul II in Porto Alegre; 1980.

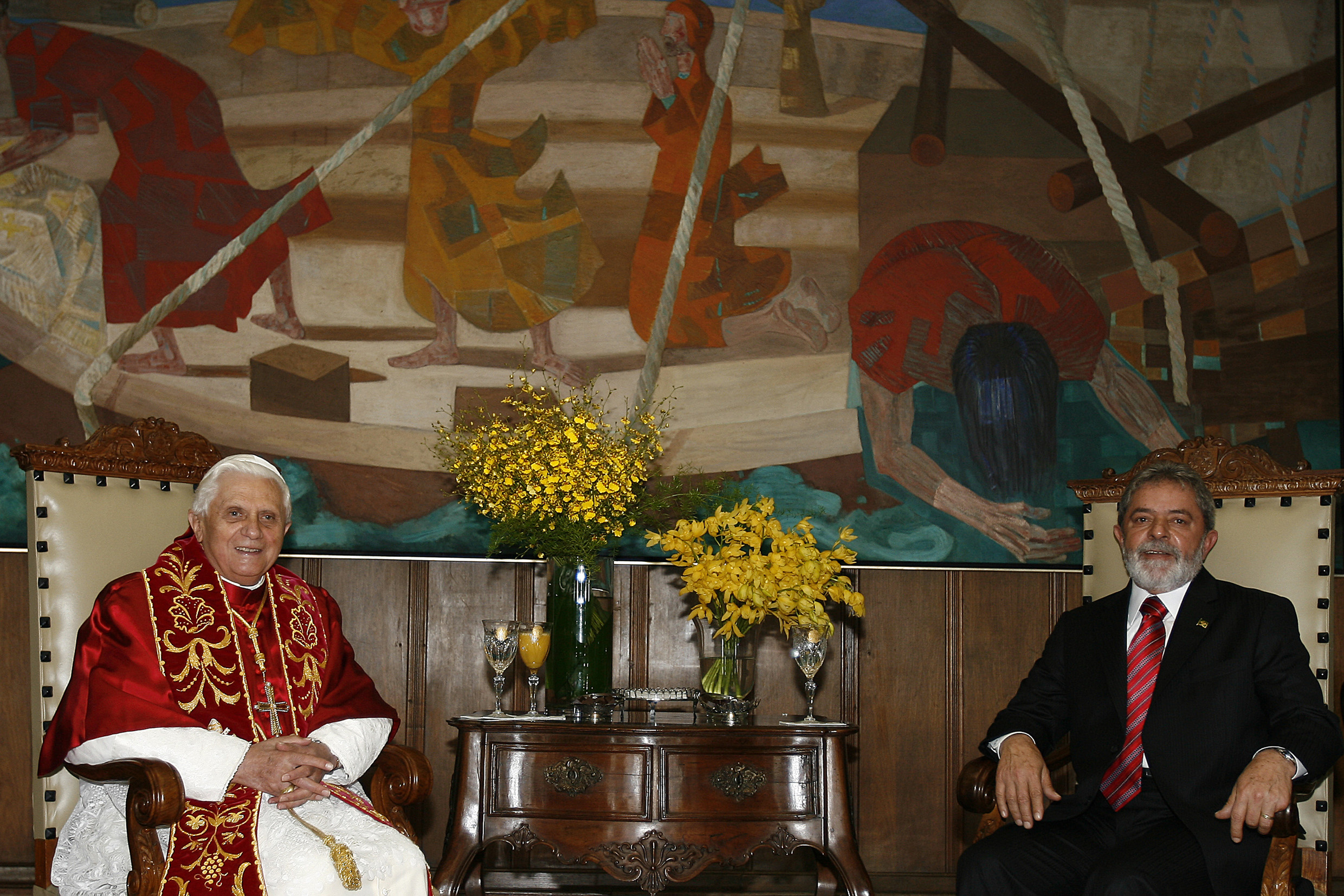
Pope Benedict XVI and President Lula da Silva in São Paulo; May 2007.

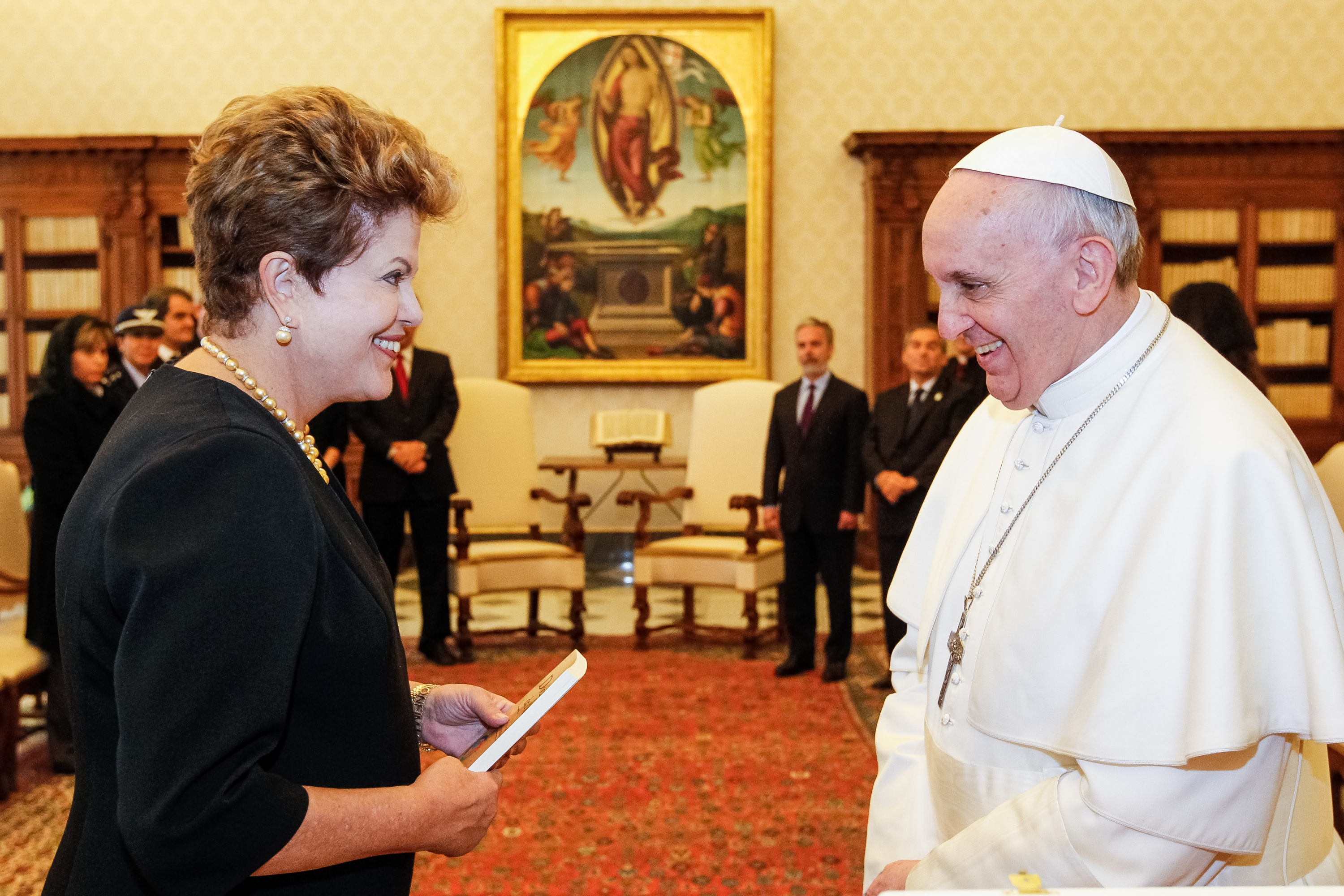
President Dilma Rousseff meeting recently elected Pope Francis in the Vatican; March 2013.

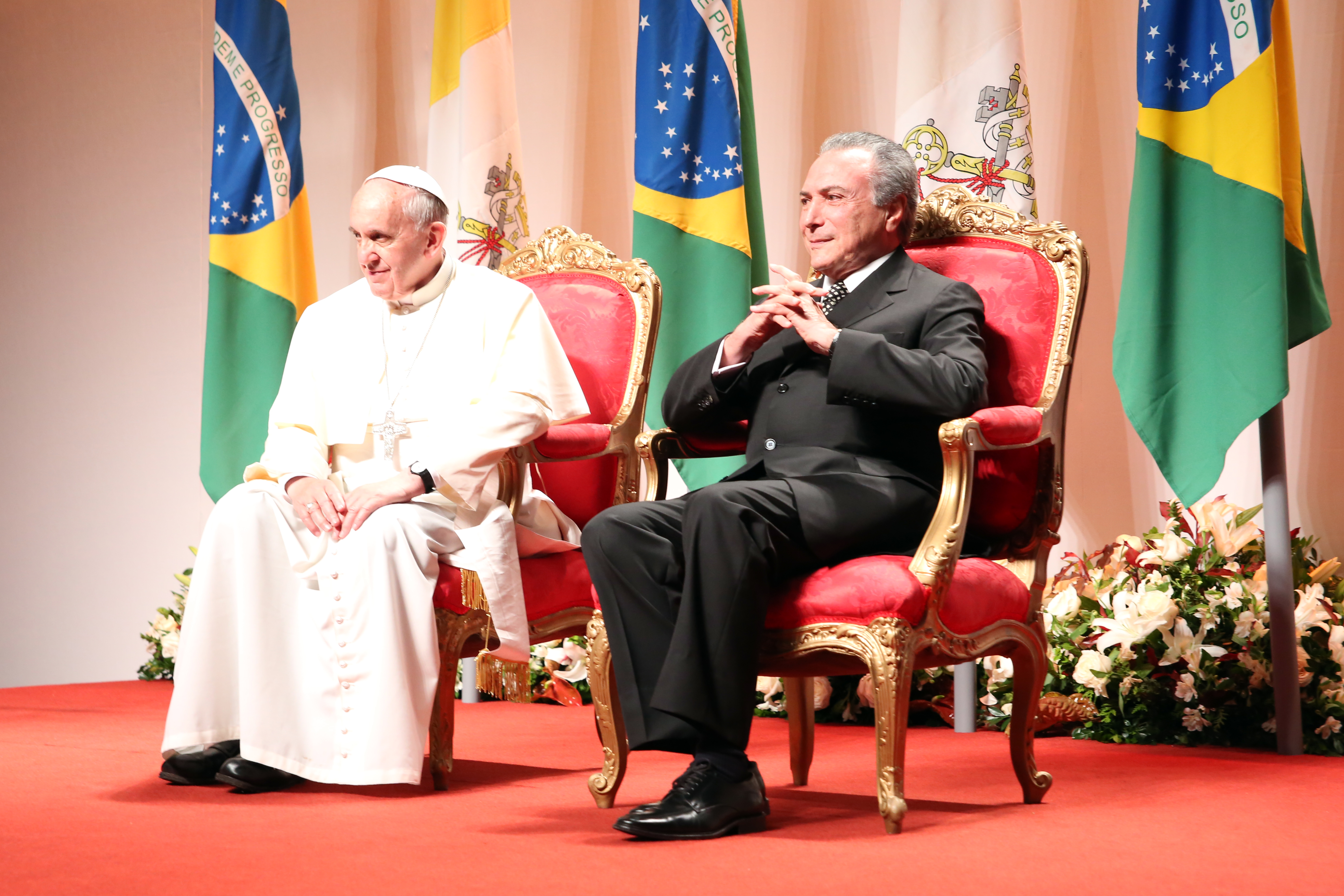
Pope Francis and President Michel Temer in Brazil; July 2013.

== Resident diplomatic missions ==
of Brazil

- Rome (Embassy to the Holy See)

of the Holy See

- Brasília (Apostolic Nunciature)

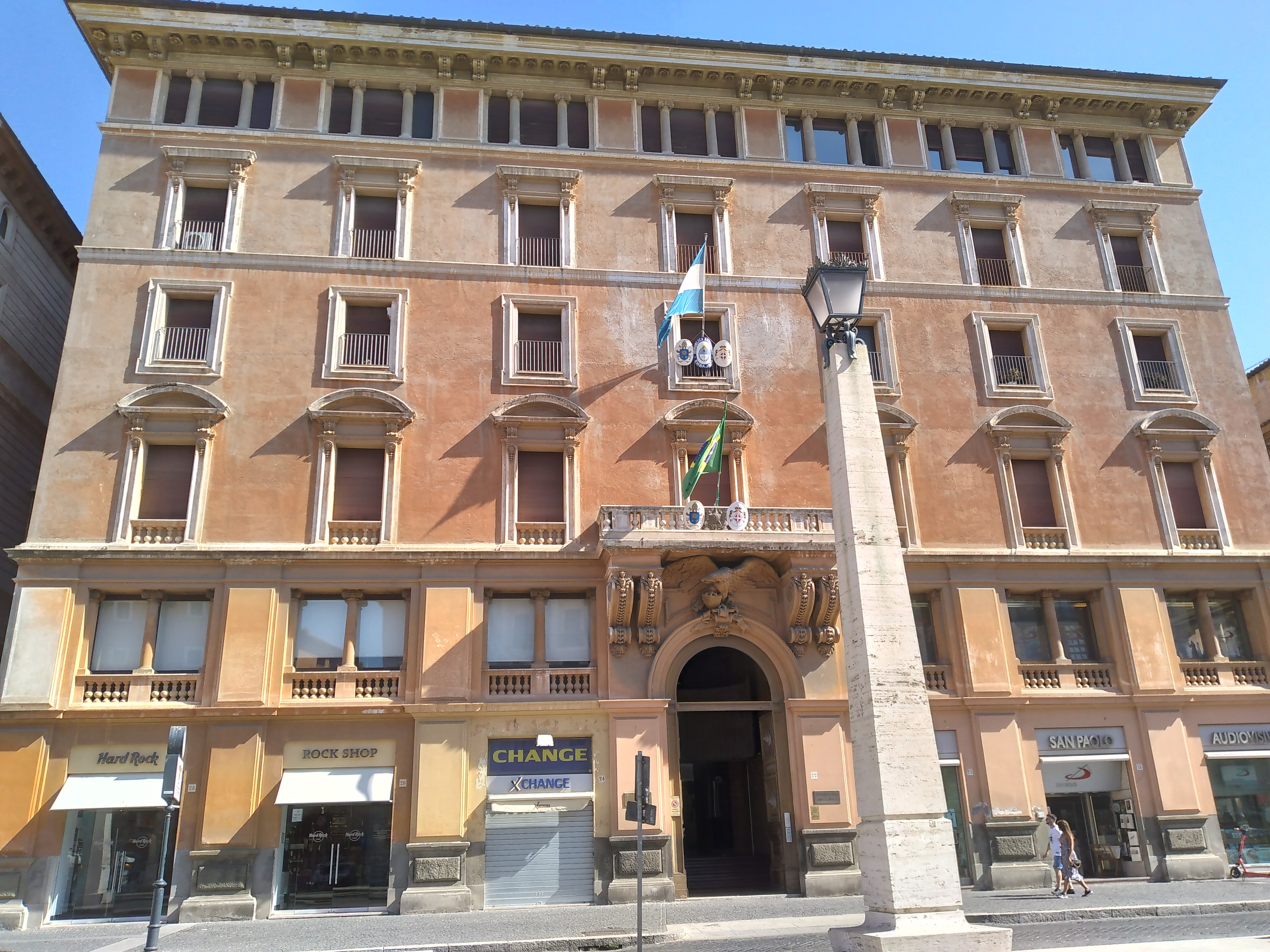
Building hosting the Embassy of Brazil to the Holy See in Rome

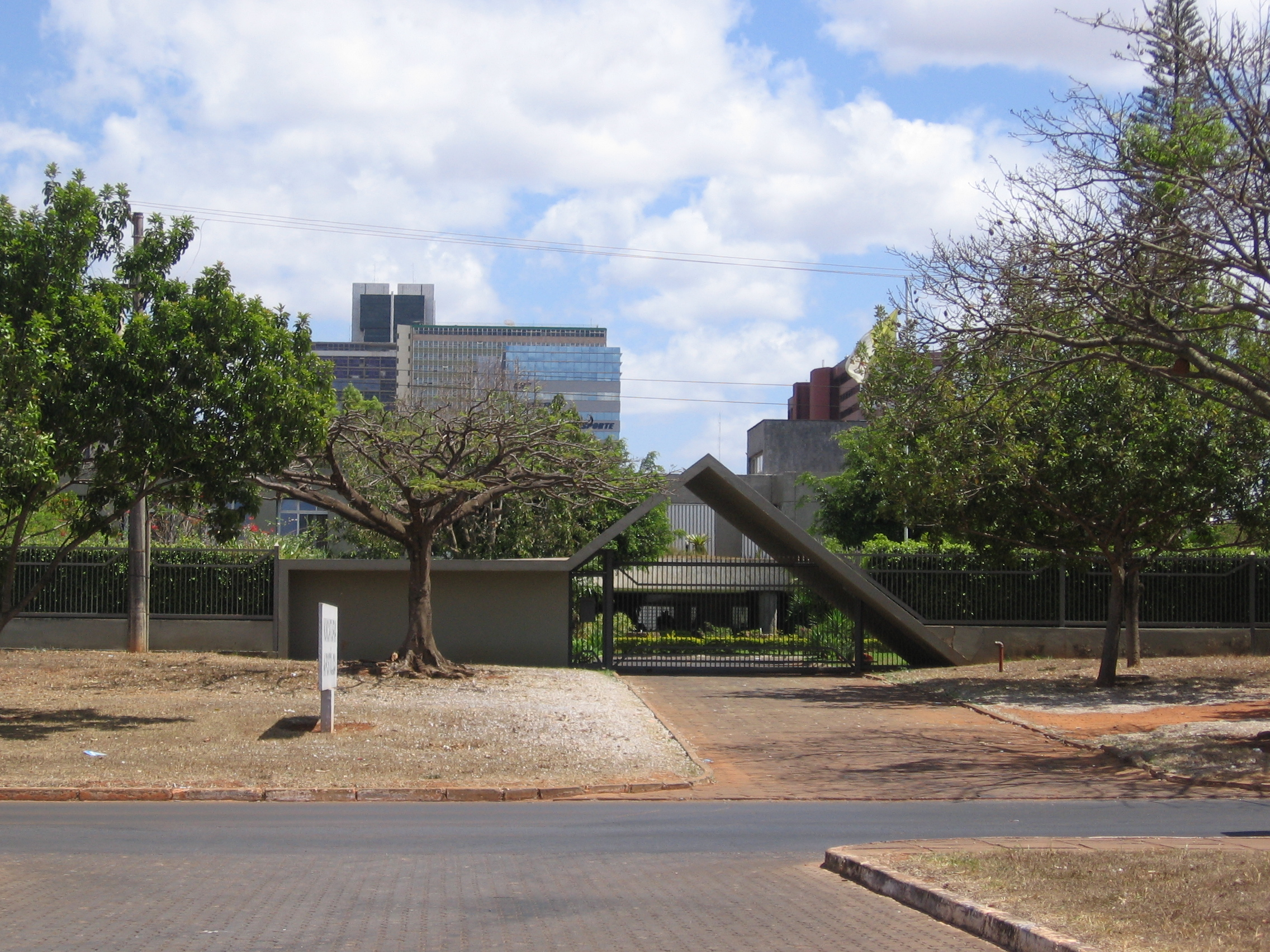
Apostolic Nunciature in Brasília

== See also ==
- Apostolic Nunciature to Brazil
- Catholic Church in Brazil
