= Holy See–Kazakhstan relations =

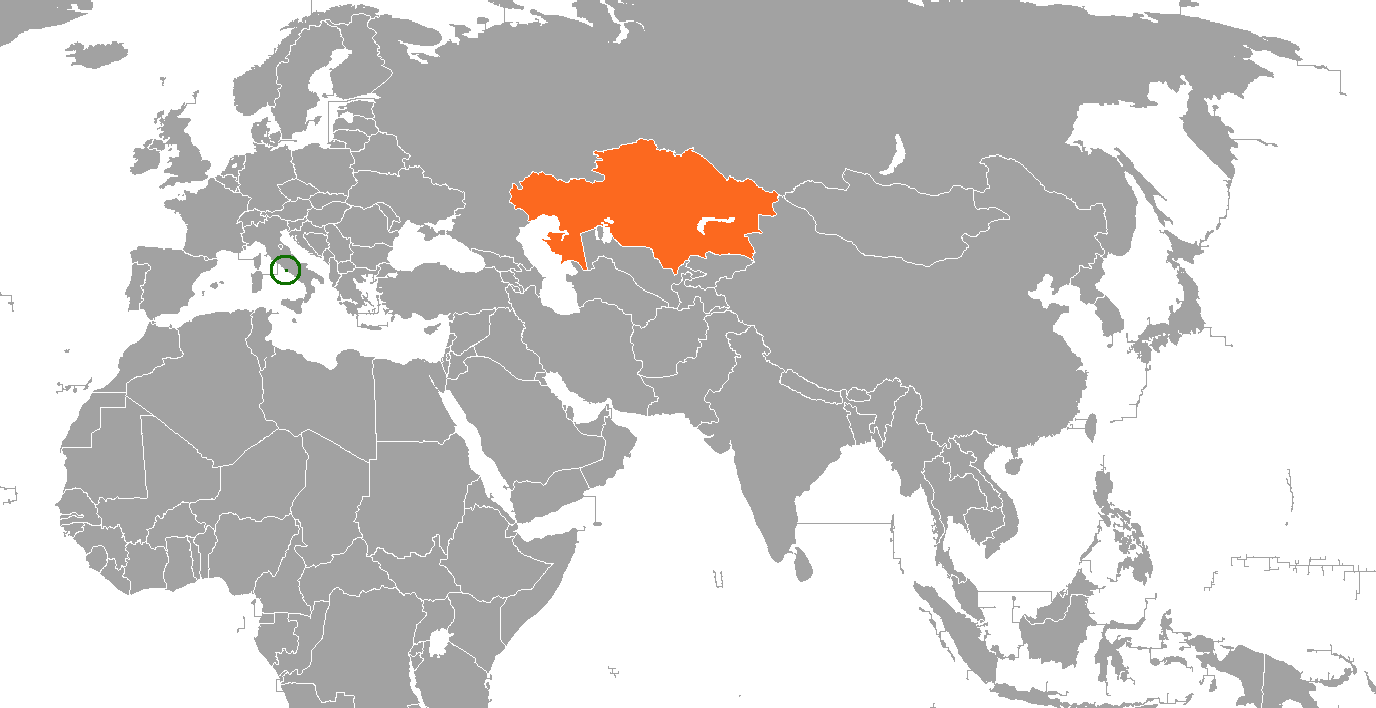

- Holy See: Kazakhstan

The Holy See and the Republic of Kazakhstan established relations on 17 October 1992.

== History ==
The Holy See and Kazakhstan established relations on 17 October 1992.

On 24 September 1998, the first official visit of the President of Kazakhstan, Nursultan Nazarbayev, took place, during which the Agreement between the Republic of Kazakhstan and the Holy See on mutual relations was signed. Kazakhstan thus became the first Central Asian state to conclude a formal agreement on cooperation with the Vatican.

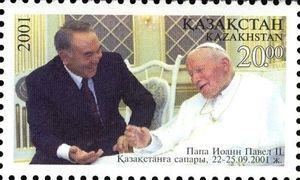
Apostolic Visit of Pope John Paul II to Kazakhstan, 2001

On 22–23 September 2001, Pope John Paul II paid an Apostolic Visit to Kazakhstan. During the visit, the Pontiff met with President Nursultan Nazarbayev, as well as with representatives of Kazakhstani youth and figures from the cultural and artistic communities. The central event of the visit was an open-air Catholic Mass held in the square near the Memorial to the Defenders of the Fatherland.

In 2001, the Apostolic Nunciature was officially opened in Astana, marking an important step in the institutional development of relations between Kazakhstan and the Holy See.

On 6 February 2003, within the framework of President Nazarbayev’s official visit to Italy, he visited the Vatican, where he held meetings with Pope John Paul II and the Vatican Secretary of State, Angelo Sodano.

On 6 November 2009, President Nursultan Nazarbayev paid another official visit to the Vatican. During the visit, he met with Pope Benedict XVI and with the Vatican Secretary of State, Cardinal Tarcisio Bertone.

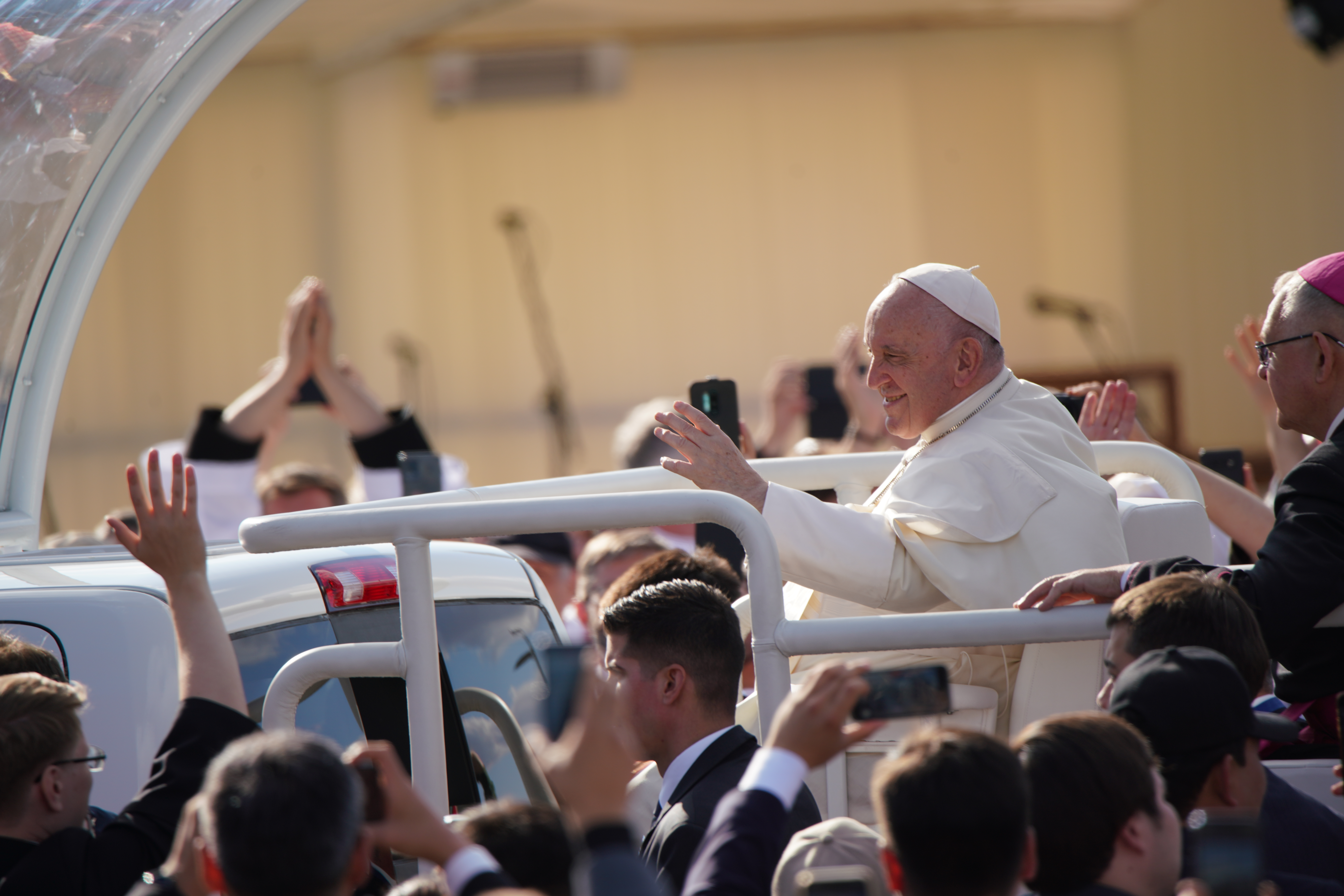
Apostolic Visit of Pope Francis to Kazakhstan, 2022

Pope Francis visited Astana in September 2022.

On 19 July 2023, the Holy See and Kazakhstan ratified an agreement on visas and residence permits for ecclesiastical and religious personnel. The agreement had been signed on 14 September 2022.

In January 2024, President Kassym-Jomart Tokayev visited the Vatican.

== See also ==
- Apostolic Nunciature to Kazakhstan
