= Holy See–Saudi Arabia relations =

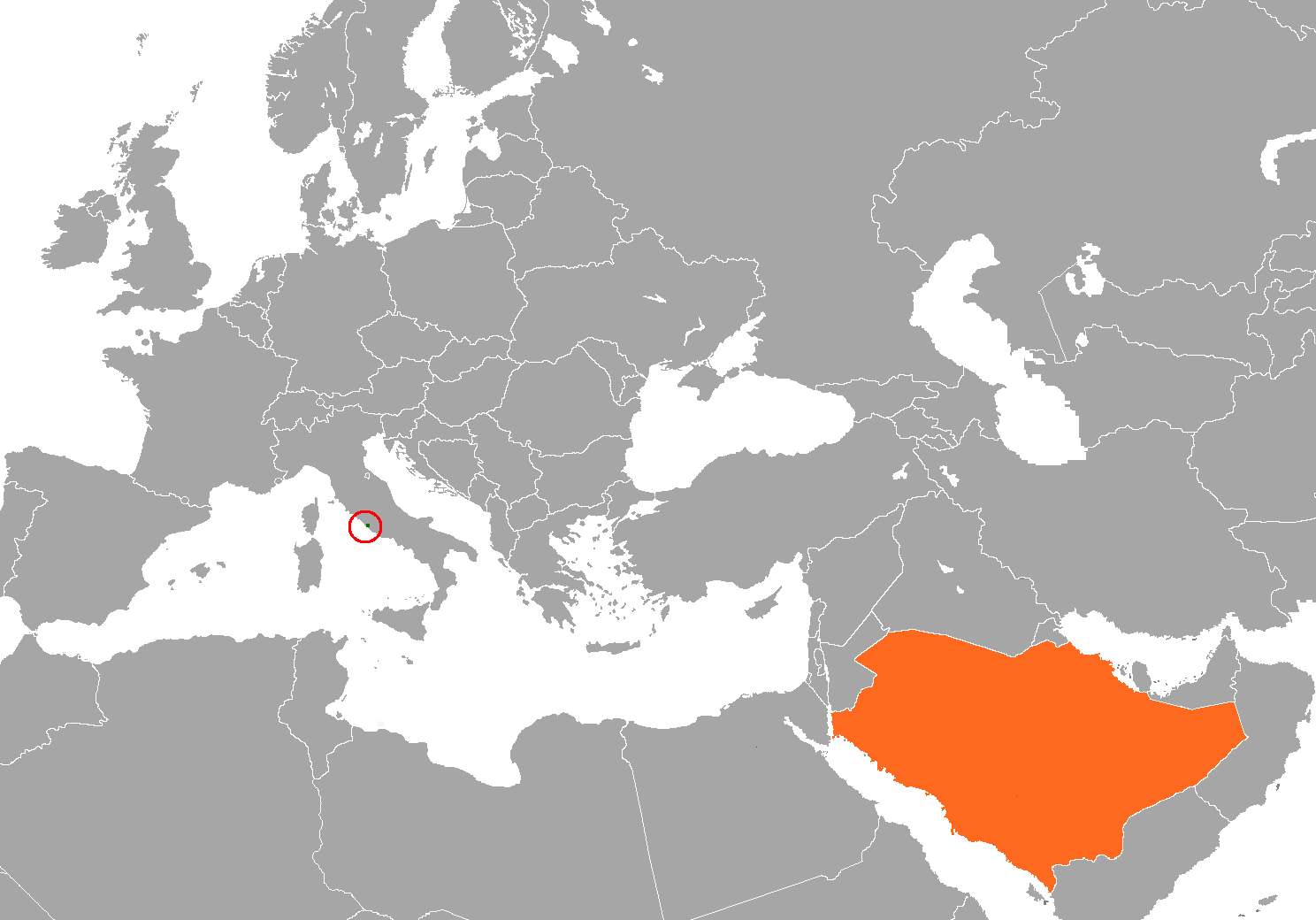
- Holy See: Saudi Arabia

The Holy See and Saudi Arabia do not maintain diplomatic relations but there have been some important high-level meetings between Saudi and Vatican officials to discuss issues and organize dialogue between religions.

== History ==
In November 2007, King Abdullah of Saudi Arabia visited the Vatican.

Proposals have been made to build a church somewhere in Saudi Arabia, citing the ancient 7th century Treaty of Najran made by Muhammad and Christian residents of Arabia.

There are many foreign workers that identify as Christian, and at present, they must cross a border to a surrounding country to find a church affiliated to the Roman Catholic church; this is due to a Saudi law that bans the worship of religions other than Islam. In the 7th century, the idea of building a church in Saudi Arabia was proposed, but this was rejected. With the exceptions of the Islamic holy cities of Mecca and Medinah, Christians are allowed to enter all of Saudi Arabia. Discussions have until now focused on the fair treatment of those foreign workers. This issue was given high priority in Pope Benedict XVI's address to the diplomatic corps in January 2011, where the Pope expressed the hope for a speedy establishment of a Catholic hierarchy within the kingdom.

== See also ==
- Foreign relations of the Holy See
- Foreign relations of Saudi Arabia
- Christianity in Saudi Arabia
- Islam and Catholicism
