= Erwin Josef Ender =

German prelate of the Catholic Church (1937–2022)

His Excellency, The Most Reverend Erwin Josef Ender
- Apostolic Nuncio Emeritus of Germany; Titular Archbishop of Germania in Numidia
- Appointed: 25 November 2003
- Term ended: 15 October 2007
- Predecessor: Giovanni Lajolo
- Successor: Jean-Claude Périsset
- Previous posts: Apostolic Nuncio to the Czech Republic (2001–2003); Apostolic Nuncio to Estonia, Lithuania and Latvia (1997–2001); Apostolic Pro-Nuncio to Sudan and Apostolic Delegate to Somalia (1990–1997)

Orders
- Ordination: 10 October 1965 by Julius Döpfner
- Consecration: 5 April 1990 by John Paul II, Giovanni Battista Re, and Justin Francis Rigali

Personal details
- Born: 7 September 1937 Steingrund, Gau Silesia, Germany
- Died: 19 December 2022 (aged 85) Rome, Italy
- Motto: CHRISTUS RECONCILIATIO NOSTRA
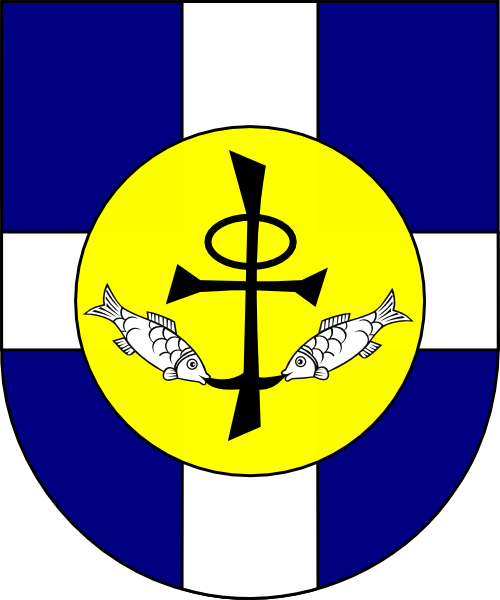
- Coat of arms

Styles of Erwin Josef Ender
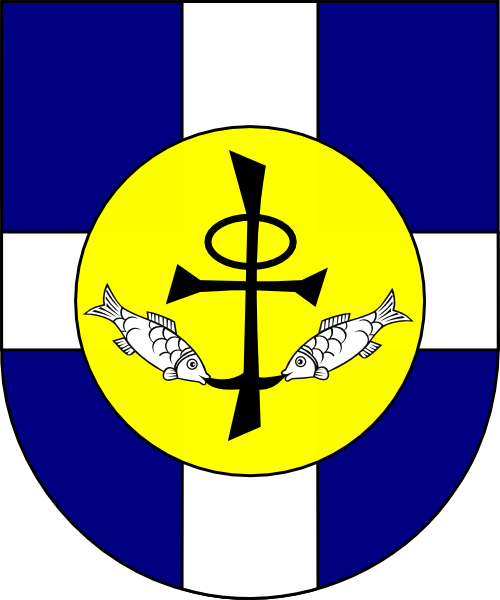
- Reference style: His Excellency; The Most Reverend
- Spoken style: Your Excellency
- Religious style: Archbishop

Erwin Josef Ender (7 September 1937 – 19 December 2022) was a German prelate of the Catholic Church who spent his career in the diplomatic service of the Holy See. He was an archbishop and had the rank of nuncio since 1990.

== Biography ==
Erwin Josef Ender was born on 7 September 1937 in Steingrund in Lower Silesia Province (now Kamienna, Poland). He spent his childhood there until the end of World War II when the region became part of Poland. The German population of Silesia was relocated and from 1945 on his family lived in Lüdinghausen in the German state of North Rhine-Westphalia.

As a seminarian Ender studied philosophy and theology at the Westfälische Wilhelms-Universität in Münster and then at the Pontifical Gregorian University and the Collegium Germanicum in Rome. He was ordained a priest of the Diocese of Münster on 10 October 1965. He received his doctorate from the Gregorian in 1970 with a thesis on the work of John Henry Newman.

Ender then entered the diplomatic service of the Holy See on 10 August 1970 and worked until 1990 in the offices of the Secretariat of State.

On 15 March 1990, Pope John Paul II appointed him Titular Archbishop of Germania in Numidia and gave him two diplomatic assignments: Apostolic Pro-Nuncio to Sudan and Apostolic Delegate to the Red Sea Region. On 5 April he received his episcopal consecration from the Pope. On 26 March 1992, his title changed from Delegate to the Red Sea Region to Delegate to Somalia. In Sudan in 1996, he accused the government of torturing a priest to extract a false confession of planning anti-government sabotage.

On 9 July 1997, John Paul named him Apostolic Nuncio to the Baltic States: Lithuania, Latvia, and Estonia. A month later, on 9 August, he was given the additional responsibility of Apostolic Administrator of Estonia.

On 19 May 2001, he was appointed Apostolic Nuncio to the Czech Republic.

On 25 November 2003, he was named Apostolic Nuncio to the Federal Republic of Germany.

On 15 October 2007, Pope Benedict XVI accepted Ender's resignation as Apostolic Nuncio in Germany and appointed Jean-Claude Périsset as his successor.

Pope Benedict named him a member of the Congregation for the Evangelization of Peoples on 9 May 2009. On 2011 he led the delegation of the Holy See to a United Nations-sponsored conference in Moscow on discrimination and persecution of Christians.

== See also ==
- List of heads of the diplomatic missions of the Holy See

Diplomatic posts
Preceded by Isaías Duarte Cancino	Titular Archbishop of Germania in Numidia; 1990–2022	Succeeded by Paul Kyung Sang Lee
Preceded by Giovanni Lajolo	Apostolic Nuncio to Germany; 2003–2007	Succeeded by Jean-Claude Périsset
Preceded by Giovanni Coppa	Apostolic Nuncio to the Czech Republic; 2001–2003	Succeeded by Diego Causero
Preceded by Justo Mullor García	Apostolic Nuncio to Lithuania, Latvia and Estonia; 1997–2001	Succeeded by Peter Stephan Zurbriggen
Preceded by Post created	Apostolic Delegate to Somalia; 1992–1997	Succeeded by Marco Dino Brogi
Preceded by Luis Robles Díaz	Apostolic Pro-Nuncio to Sudan; 1990–1997	Succeeded by Marco Dino Brogi
Preceded by Luis Robles Díaz	Apostolic Delegate to Red Sea Region; 1990–1997	Succeeded by Pablo Puente Buces
