= Antonino Arata =

Italian prelate

- Titular Archbishop of Sardes
- Church: Catholic Church
- In office: 12 July 1935 – 25 August 1948
- Predecessor: Arthur Hinsley
- Successor: Giovanni Urbani
- Other post: Official for the Congregation for the Oriental Churches (1941-1948)
- Previous posts: Apostolic Nuncio to Latvia (1935-1940); Apostolic Nuncio to Estonia (1935-1939); Official to Estonia (1933-1935); Official to Lithuania (1931-1933)

Orders
- Ordination: 9 June 1906
- Consecration: 11 August 1935 by Eugenio Maria Giuseppe Giovanni Pacelli

Personal details
- Born: 28 October 1883 Piacenza, Province of Piacenza, Kingdom of Italy
- Died: 25 August 1948 (aged 64) Grottaferrata, Lazio, Italy

Antonino Arata (28 October 1883 – 25 August 1948) was an Italian prelate of the Catholic Church who worked in the diplomatic service of the Holy See for twenty years, principally in Eastern Europe. He became an archbishop in 1935 and then in the Roman Curia from 1941 until his death.

== Biography ==
Antonino Arata was born on 28 October 1883 in Piacenza, Italy. He was ordained a priest on 9 June 1906.

To prepare for a diplomatic career he entered the Pontifical Ecclesiastical Academy in 1920.

His first assignment as a junior member of the diplomatic corps was in the Nunciature to Czechoslovakia, newly established upon the creation of the new nation in the breakup of the Austro-Hungarian Empire. Appointed first secretary in the spring of 1921, he was in Prague from June 1921 to March 1927, critical years of conflict with the new political establishment. He was then posted briefly to Austria, and then to Portugal and Argentina.

In the summer of 1931, as the result of a dispute over Church influence in education, the government of Lithuania declared the Holy See's representative there, Apostolic Internuncio Riccardo Bartoloni persona non grata. By the end of the year Arata was sent to de-escalate the conflict and by 1932 had established a working relationship with the government. On 18 October 1933 he became the chargé d'affaires in the new nunciature in Estonia, and he headed that nunciature for a few months following the death of the nuncio, Antonino Zecchini, in March 1935.

On 12 July 1935, Pope Pius XI appointed him Apostolic Nuncio to both Latvia and Estonia as well as titular archbishop of Sardes. He received his episcopal consecration on 11 August 1935 from Cardinal Eugenio Pacelli, the future Pope Pius XII. After the Soviet Union annexed the Baltic States, the nunciatures in Latvia and Estonia were forced to close and Arata returned to Rome at the end of August 1940.

On 31 March 1941, Pope Pius named him assessor of the Congregation for the Oriental Churches. On 28 April, he was made consultor to the Congregation for Extraordinary Ecclesiastical Affairs and a member of the Pontifical Commission for Russia. On 28 June 1948 he was named a member of the Central Committee for the next Holy Year. Yves Congar, one of the key theologians of the period, reported that in 1946 Arata encouraged his work on Christian ecumenism when few others in Vatican circles were enthusiastic; Arata endorsed the strategy of pursuing local initiatives rather than expect commitment from the Holy See.

He died on 25 August 1948 in Grottaferrata, just outside Rome.
