= Peter Stephan Zurbriggen =

Swiss Catholic archbishop (1943–2022)

His Excellency, The Most Reverend Peter Stephan Zurbriggen
- Apostolic Nuncio emeritus of Austria; Titular Archbishop of Glastonbury
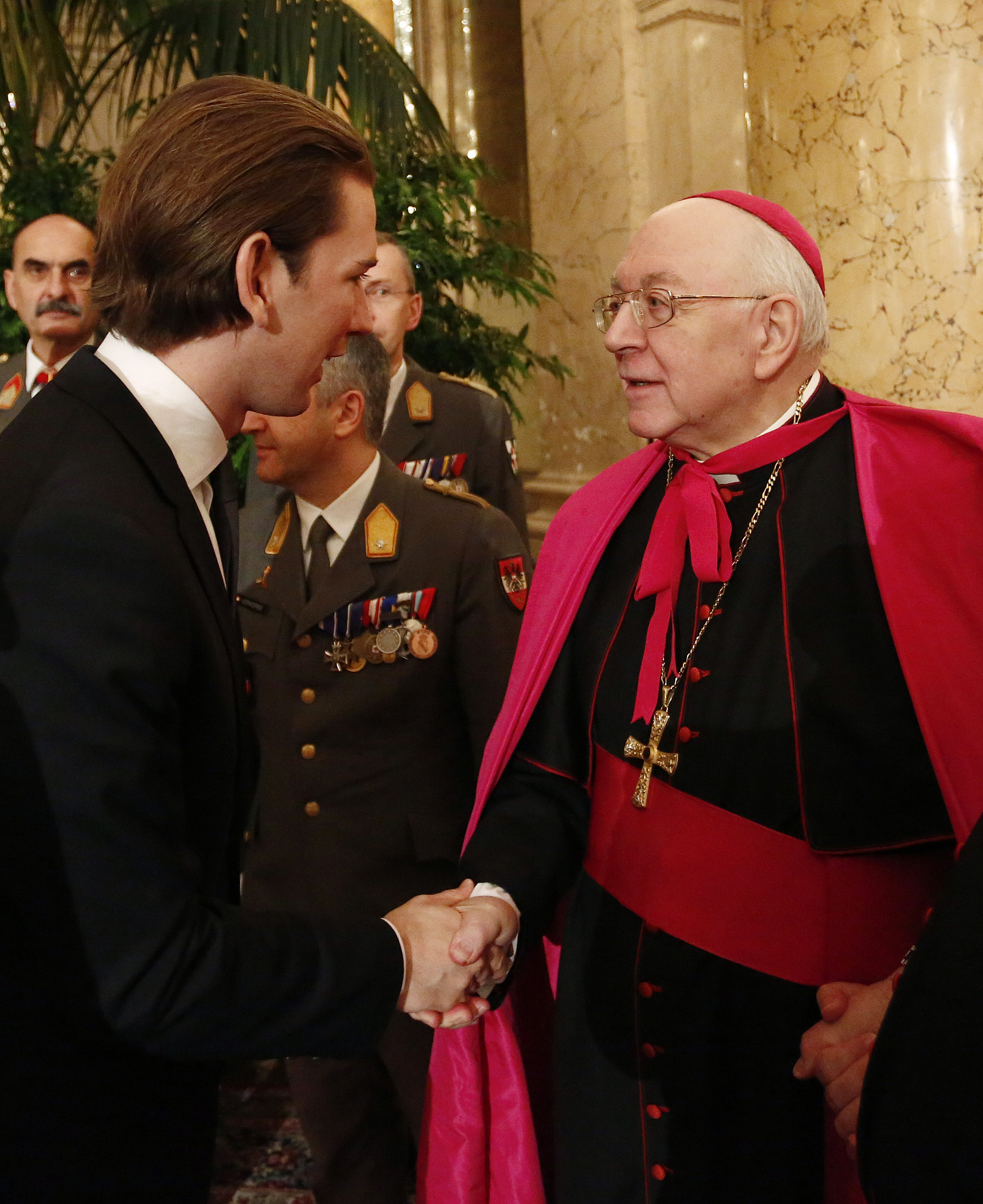
- Zurbriggen with Sebastian Kurz, Chancellor of Austria
- Appointed: 14 January 2009
- Term ended: 30 November 2018
- Predecessor: Edmond Farhat
- Successor: Pedro López Quintana
- Other post: Titular Archbishop of Glastonbury
- Previous posts: Apostolic Nuncio to Estonia, Latvia and Lithuania (2001–2009); Apostolic Administrator of Estonia (2001–2005); Apostolic Nuncio to Armenia, Azerbaijan and Georgia (1998–2001); Apostolic Delegate/Nuncio to Mozambique (1993–1998)

Orders
- Ordination: 10 October 1969
- Consecration: 6 January 1994 by John Paul II, Giovanni Battista Re, and Josip Uhac

Personal details
- Born: 27 August 1943 Brig, Switzerland
- Died: 28 August 2022 (aged 79) Brig, Switzerland
- Motto: Sancta Crux Mihi Lux

Styles of Peter Stephan Zurbriggen
- Reference style: His Excellency; The Most Reverend
- Spoken style: Your Excellency
- Religious style: Archbishop

Peter Stephan Zurbriggen (27 August 1943 – 28 August 2022) was a Swiss archbishop of the Catholic Church, who worked in the diplomatic service of the Holy See from 1993 until his retirement in 2018. He was Apostolic Nuncio to Austria from 2009 to 2018.

== Biography ==
He was born and died in Brig, Switzerland. He was ordained a priest on 10 October 1969, entering the Pontifical Ecclesiastical Academy in 1970.

On 13 November 1993, he was named Apostolic Delegate to Mozambique, advancing to the post of Apostolic Nuncio in that country on 22 February 1996.

He was elevated to the episcopacy on 6 January 1994, becoming titular archbishop of Glastonbury.

On 13 June 1998, Pope John Paul II appointed him Apostolic Nunzio to Georgia, Armenia and Azerbaijan. From 25 October 2001 he was Apostolic Nuncio to Lithuania, Latvia and Estonia. Pope John Paul II named him Apostolic Administrator of Estonia on 15 November 2001. Pope Benedict XVI named him Apostolic Nuncio to Austria on 14 January 2009.

== See also ==
- List of heads of the diplomatic missions of the Holy See

Catholic Church titles
Preceded by Edmond Y. Farhat	Apostolic Nuncio to Austria; 2009–2018	Succeeded by Pedro López Quintana
Preceded by Erwin Josef Ender	Apostolic Administrator of Estonia; 2001–2005	Succeeded by Philippe Jourdan
Preceded by Erwin Josef Ender	Apostolic Nuncio to Lithuania, Latvia, Estonia; 2001–2009	Succeeded by Luigi Bonazzi
Preceded by Jean-Paul Aimé Gobel	Apostolic Nuncio to Georgia, Azerbaijan, Armenia; 1998–2001	Succeeded by Claudio Gugerotti
Preceded by Giacinto Berloco	Apostolic Delegate to Mozambique; 1993–1998	Succeeded by Juliusz Janusz
Preceded by Kevin O’Connor	Titular Archbishop of Glastonia; 1993–2022	Succeeded by Sede vacante
