= Antonino Zecchini =

Italian prelate

Antonino Zecchini SJ
- Apostolic Nuncio to Latvia
- Church: Catholic Church
- In office: 25 October 1922 – 17 March 1935
- Predecessor: Edward O'Rourke
- Successor: Antonino Arata
- Other posts: Titular Archbishop of Myra (1922-1935)
- Previous posts: Apostolic Delegate to Estonia (1922-1933); Apostolic Administrator of Estonia (1924-1931); Apostolic Delegate to Lithuania (1922-1925)

Orders
- Ordination: 25 June 1893
- Consecration: 21 December 1922 by Andreas Frühwirth

Personal details
- Born: 7 December 1864 Visco, Princely County of Gorizia and Gradisca, Austrian Littoral, Austrian Empire
- Died: 17 March 1935 (aged 70) Riga, Latvia

Antonino Zecchini (7 December 1864 – 17 March 1935) was an Italian prelate of the Catholic Church who worked in the Baltic nations from 1921 to 1935 as a diplomat and Church administrator; he became an archbishop in 1922. He devoted the first half of his career from 1892 to 1920 to pastoral work, preaching and education in the Italian and Slovenian regions of the Austro-Hungarian Empire.

== Training and ministry in the Austro-Hungarian Empire ==
Antonino Zecchini was born on 7 December 1864 in Visco, a town now in the Province of Udine, Italy, then part of the Austrian Empire. He studied in Gorizia. He entered the Jesuits and studied at their novitiates in France and Spain. He wrote that he hoped to work in mission countries, especially "the Austrian coast because I like the Friulian, Italian, German and Slovenian languages". From 1883 to 1886 he studied philosophy in Portorè; from 1887 to 1890 he taught Latin and Greek at the Jesuit high school in Zadar.

He was ordained a priest in 1892 and in 1897 he went to Soresina, now in the Italian Province of Cremona, to study theology. From 1898 to 1921 he performed pastoral work in and around Gorizia while also teaching languages and canon law. During the First World War, he was in charge of missions for refugees and the sick in Trieste.

== Diplomacy and administration in the Baltic nations ==
In 1921, the Holy See sent him as an Apostolic Visitor to assess the situation of Catholics in the three newly independent Baltic nations. (Note: When he was named Apostolic Delegate in 1922, his previous title was "Apostolic Visitor to the Baltic Countries".) On 25 October 1922, Pope Pius XI named him titular archbishop of Myra and Apostolic Delegate to Latvia, Lithuania, and Estonia. He received his episcopal consecration on 21 December 1922 from Cardinal Andreas Frühwirth. Over the next 15 years, his work took a very different shape in each of these countries.

Lithuania

Of the three Baltic nations, Lithuania had the largest Catholic population and Zecchini chose to live in Kaunas at first but his relationship with the government was always contentious and he left within a year. In the ongoing conflict between Lithuania and Poland, the Holy See found it far more important to develop good relations with Poland, which provoked popular hostility in Lithuania and made Zecchini's position untenable. (Note: The Vatican appointed a Polish auxiliary bishop for Vilnius, Kazimierz Mikołaj Michalkiewicz, on 12 January 1923 when control of that city was disputed but under Polish occupation.) After years without meaningful progress in building a relationship with successive Lithuanian governments, he was replaced as Delegate to Lithuania on 10 March 1927 by Lorenzo Schioppa.

Estonia

Estonia had a tiny Catholic population. On 1 November 1924, Pope Pius XI appointed Zecchini Apostolic Administrator of Estonia, a new ecclesiastical jurisdiction created that day by taking territory from the Diocese of Riga in Latvia. It consisted of just four parishes. Zecchini initiated discussions for a concordat between the Holy See and Estonia. On 11 May 1931, he was succeeded as Administrator by Eduard Profittlich, another Jesuit. Zecchini resigned as Apostolic Delegate to Estonia on 22 October 1933.

Latvia

Zecchini settled in Riga, Latvia, after assessing the situation in Lithuania. He was the key Church official working on the concordat that Latvia and the Holy See signed on 30 May 1922. He continued to build the Holy See's relationship with the Latvian government. Without the challenge presented in Lithuania by Polish claims, the Vatican could make a supportive gesture, for example, by raising the status of the Diocese of Riga to an Archdiocese on 25 October 1923. On 14 April 1926, Pope Pius named him Apostolic Internuncio to Latvia.

Zecchini died in Riga on 17 March 1935 at the age of 70.
