= Georg Gänswein =

German Catholic prelate (born 1956)

His Excellency, The Most Reverend Georg Gänswein
- Apostolic Nuncio to Lithuania, Estonia, and Latvia
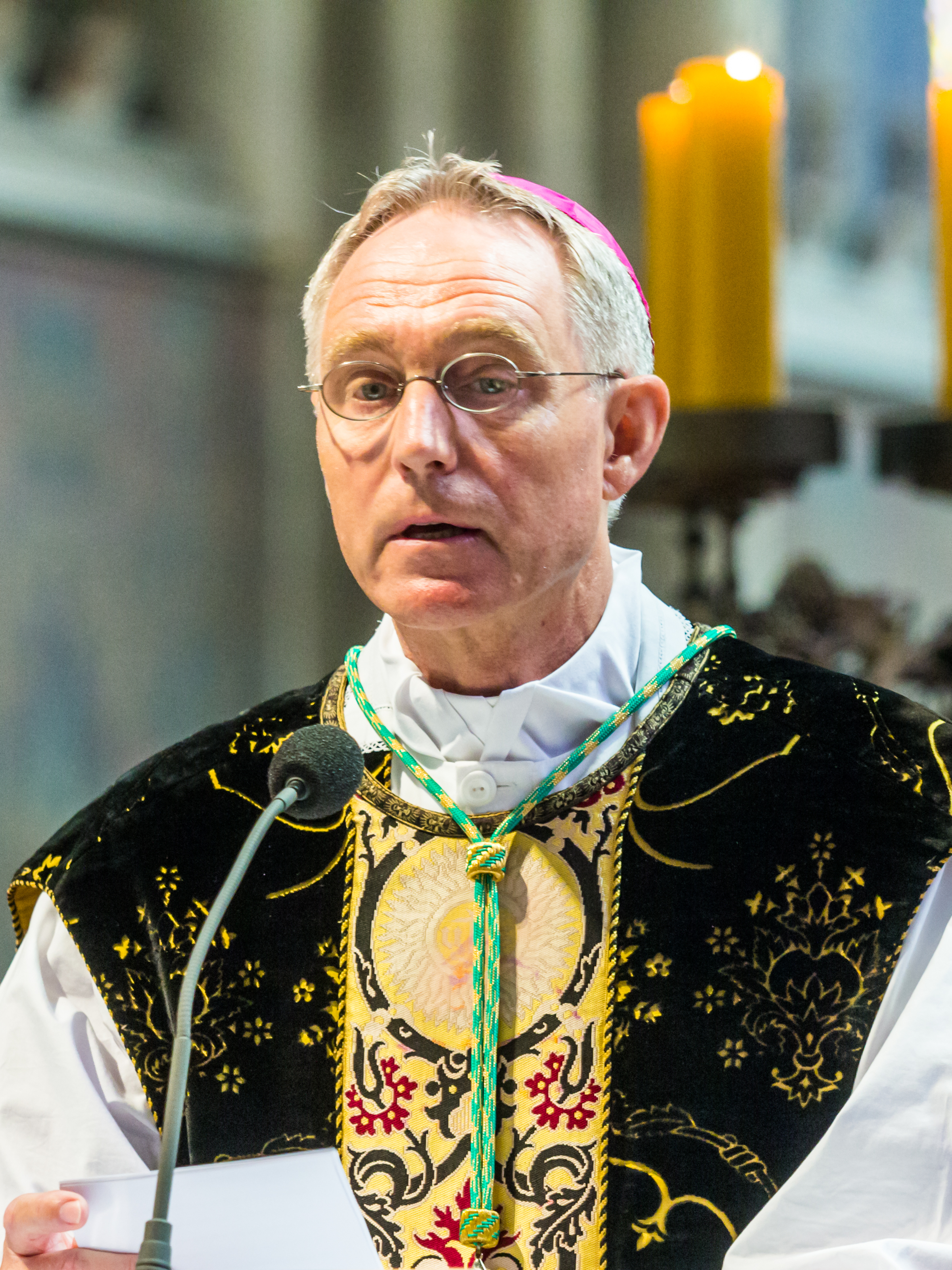
- Gänswein in 2017
- Church: Catholic
- Appointed: 24 June 2024
- Predecessor: Petar Rajič
- Other posts: Titular Archbishop of Urbs Salvia (2012‍–‍ ); Honorary Canon of the Freiburg Cathedral (2023‍–‍ )
- Previous posts: Personal Secretary of Pope Benedict XVI (2005‍–‍2022); Prefect of the Prefecture of the Papal Household (2012‍–‍2023)

Orders
- Ordination: 31 May 1984 by Oskar Saier
- Consecration: 6 January 2013 by Pope Benedict XVI

Personal details
- Born: 30 July 1956 (age 70) Riedern am Wald, Waldshut, West Germany
- Education: LMU Munich
- Motto: Testimonium perhibere veritati (Latin for 'To bear witness to the truth') (John 18:37)
- Coat of arms: Georg Gänswein's coat of arms

Ordination history
History
Diaconal ordination
- Date: 19 December 1982
Priestly ordination
- Ordained by: Oskar Saier
- Date: 31 May 1984
Episcopal consecration
- Principal consecrator: Pope Benedict XVI
- Co-consecrators: Tarcisio Bertone; Zenon Grocholewski
- Date: 6 January 2013
- Place: Saint Peter's Basilica

Styles of Georg Gänswein
- Reference style: The Most Reverend
- Spoken style: Your Excellency
- Religious style: Archbishop

Georg Gänswein (pronounced [ˈɡeːɔʁk ˈɡɛnsvaɪn]; born 30 July 1956) is a German prelate of the Catholic Church who was named Apostolic Nuncio to Lithuania, Estonia, and Latvia on 24 June 2024. He served as Prefect of the Papal Household from 2012 to 2023 and was the Personal Secretary of Pope Benedict XVI. He was a professor of Canon Law at the Pontifical University of the Holy Cross for about a decade and has been an archbishop since 2013. He is also an Honorary Canon of Freiburg Cathedral.

Gänswein is fluent in speaking and writing Italian, Spanish, German, English, French, and Latin.

== Early years ==
Gänswein was born in Riedern am Wald, Waldshut, Baden-Württemberg, a village in the Black Forest and part of Ühlingen-Birkendorf municipality in Germany, as the eldest son of Albert Gänswein, a blacksmith, and his wife Gertrud. He has two brothers and two sisters.

Gänswein has said that he decided to become a priest in 1974 when he was 18. He began his seminary training in 1976 and was ordained a priest of the Archdiocese of Freiburg on 31 May 1984. (Note: Gänswein has denied the claim—made without attribution in the French weekly L'Express in 2009—that he attended the International Seminary of Saint Pius X in Switzerland. Robert Mickens, writing in The Tablet, repeated the charge in 2009. A book published in 2010 quotes him as saying: "I never had or have currently any contact with Ecône or its adherents. Whoever says that simply wants to damage me." ("Ich hatte nie und habe auch gegenwärtig keinerlei Kontakte mit Ecône oder mit Anhängern von Ecône. Wer das behauptet, will mir schlichtweg schaden.")) He spent the next two years in the Black Forest as a curate (assistant priest).

He received his doctorate in canon law from LMU Munich in 1993, writing his dissertation about Ecclesiology according to the Second Vatican Council. He later said: "After half a year I was so fed up I said to myself, now I'm going to the archbishop and ask him to take me back into the diocese because I can't stand it anymore.... I'd always studied gladly and easily, but studying Canon Law I felt to be as dry as work in a quarry where there's no beer — you die of dryness."

== Roman Curia ==
Gänswein was posted to Rome in 1993, entering the Roman Curia as an official of the Congregation for Divine Worship and the Discipline of the Sacraments in 1995 and joined the staff of Cardinal Joseph Ratzinger at the Congregation for the Doctrine of the Faith in 1996. He also became a professor of canon law at the Pontifical University of the Holy Cross and taught there until 2005.

On 25 April 2000, Pope John Paul II conferred on him the honorific title Chaplain of His Holiness. He replaced Josef Clemens as Ratzinger's personal secretary in 2003, when Clemens became secretary of the Pontifical Council for the Laity.

Gänswein would later recall that his interest in Ratzinger began during his seminary years, when he read Ratzinger's articles and books while the future pope was still a professor in Germany. He came to regard Ratzinger not only as a theologian but as "a man full of faith and intelligence." He has described his eventual invitation into Ratzinger's collaboration as mysterious and grace-filled, saying he views it as "a great gift of Providence." Of the years spent at Benedict's side, Gänswein has said they constituted not only intellectual and theological formation but "formation of the heart, soul, and everything that we can call life."

When Ratzinger was elected pope in 2005, Gänswein was appointed Principal Private Secretary to His Holiness. A year later on 28 March 2006, Pope Benedict XVI gave him the title Prelate of His Holiness.

In an interview in July 2006, he described the Pope's typical day: "The Pope's day begins with Mass at 7am, followed by morning prayer and a period of contemplation. Afterwards we eat breakfast together, and my day then begins with sorting through the correspondence, which arrives in considerable quantity." He said that he accompanied Benedict to morning audiences, followed by lunch together, a "short walk," and a rest, after which he presented the Pope with documents which require his attention.

In January 2007, Italian artist and fashion designer Donatella Versace used Gänswein as the artistic inspiration for her Fall 2007 "Clergyman Collection", thereby boosting popular recognition of Gänswein's nickname, "Gorgeous George" (Italian: Bel Giorgio). In January 2013, Gänswein's photo, without his consent, appeared on the cover of the Italian version of Vanity Fair magazine.

In 2007 he was mentioned as a possible candidate for the post of Archbishop of Munich and Freising. In August 2013 he was reported as saying that he did not see himself returning to Germany in such a role, that he was focused on Rome and he did not expect that to change. In August 2013, anticipating his first sermon in the Freiburg cathedral since being ordained a priest, he said: "I am still a priest of the Archdiocese of Freiburg and see myself as such."

Gänswein plays tennis, and skis. He has an "amateur pilot's license".

== Prefect of the Pontifical Household ==
On 7 December 2012, Gänswein was appointed Prefect of the Pontifical Household, replacing Cardinal James Michael Harvey, and raised to the rank of archbishop with the titular see of Urbs Salvia. Some criticized the appointment as the promotion of a personal favourite into a position to control access to the pope and whose conservative views would "confirm, reinforce and encourage" Benedict's. In this position, Gänswein arranged papal audiences both public and private, regardless of their size or rank of visitors, and handled the logistics for most large Vatican events and ceremonies as well as the pope's travels both in Rome and Italy. He was consecrated bishop on 6 January 2013 by Pope Benedict.

A few weeks later Pope Benedict resigned from the papacy effective 28 February, and Gänswein moved with him to Castel Gandolfo while continuing as prefect. He moved with Benedict again on 2 May to the Mater Ecclesiae Monastery in Vatican City.

In 2017 Gänswein suffered from hearing loss, but recovered. In 2020 he was hospitalized for a serious kidney problem.

In early 2020, following a public dispute with Cardinal Sarah, Gänswein's responsibilities were changed. Though he remained prefect, he ceased to perform the public functions of that office. The Holy See Press Office said Gänswein's role reflected a "redistribution of the various commitments and duties" of papal household staff.

Gänswein still held the prefect's title when Pope Benedict died on 31 December 2022. He met with Pope Francis on 9 January, 4 March, and 19 May 2023, still identified by his prefect's title.

In April 2023, Pope Francis told an interviewer that he had told Gänswein to vacate his Vatican City apartment within a few months and then live either in Italy outside the Vatican or in his native Germany.

On 15 June 2023, the Holy See Press Office announced that Gänswein's last day as prefect was 28 February 2023, and that "for the time being" Pope Francis had told him to return as of 1 July to his home diocese, the Archdiocese of Freiburg im Breisgau. That Gänswein had remained in Rome was an anomaly; his predecessors had received assignments that took them elsewhere. The fact that he was not given a new role was unusual. His term as prefect ended on the tenth anniversary of the end of Pope Benedict's papacy.

== Apostolic Nuncio to Lithuania, Estonia, and Latvia ==
Having relocated to Freiburg, Germany, Gänswein lived in an apartment at the local seminary. On 17 July 2023, the Archdiocese of Freiburg announced he had been made an Honorary Canon of Freiburg Cathedral and might on occasion celebrate confirmations or preside at local festivals.

On 24 June 2024, Pope Francis appointed him Apostolic Nuncio to Lithuania, Estonia, and Latvia. An appointment to a diplomatic post is traditional practise for former papal secretaries and had been rumored for Gänswein as early as March 2023, and an assignment to the Baltic states was discussed in the press in April 2024. The Catholic News Agency described Gänswein's appointment as nuncio as a surprise as he and the pope have had quite a "strained relationship" and Francis had left him without an official role for a year. (Note: The Catholic News Agency incorrectly identified Gänswein's predecessor as Archbishop Pedro López Quintana.) The three diplomatic posts Gänswein assumed had been vacated by Archbishop Petar Rajič just three months earlier. Rajič would eventually succeed Gänswein as Prefect of the Papal Household in March 2026, three years after its vacancy. Gänswein becomes only the sixth active apostolic nuncio who did not attend the Pontifical Ecclesiastical Academy, the training institute for most members of the diplomatic corps of the Holy See. (Note: The other five are Archbishops Charles J. Brown, Giovanni Pietro Dal Toso, Savio Hon Tai-Fai, Noël Treanor, and Alfred Xuereb.)

He presented his Letters of Credence to the President of Lithuania, Gitanas Nausėda, on 6 September 2024.

== Views and controversies ==
=== Resignation of Benedict XVI ===
Pope Benedict announced on 11 February 2013 that he was resigning on 28 February. Gänswein moved with him then to Castel Gandolfo while continuing in his role as head of the Pontifical Household. He moved with Benedict on 2 May to the Mater Ecclesiae Monastery in Vatican City.

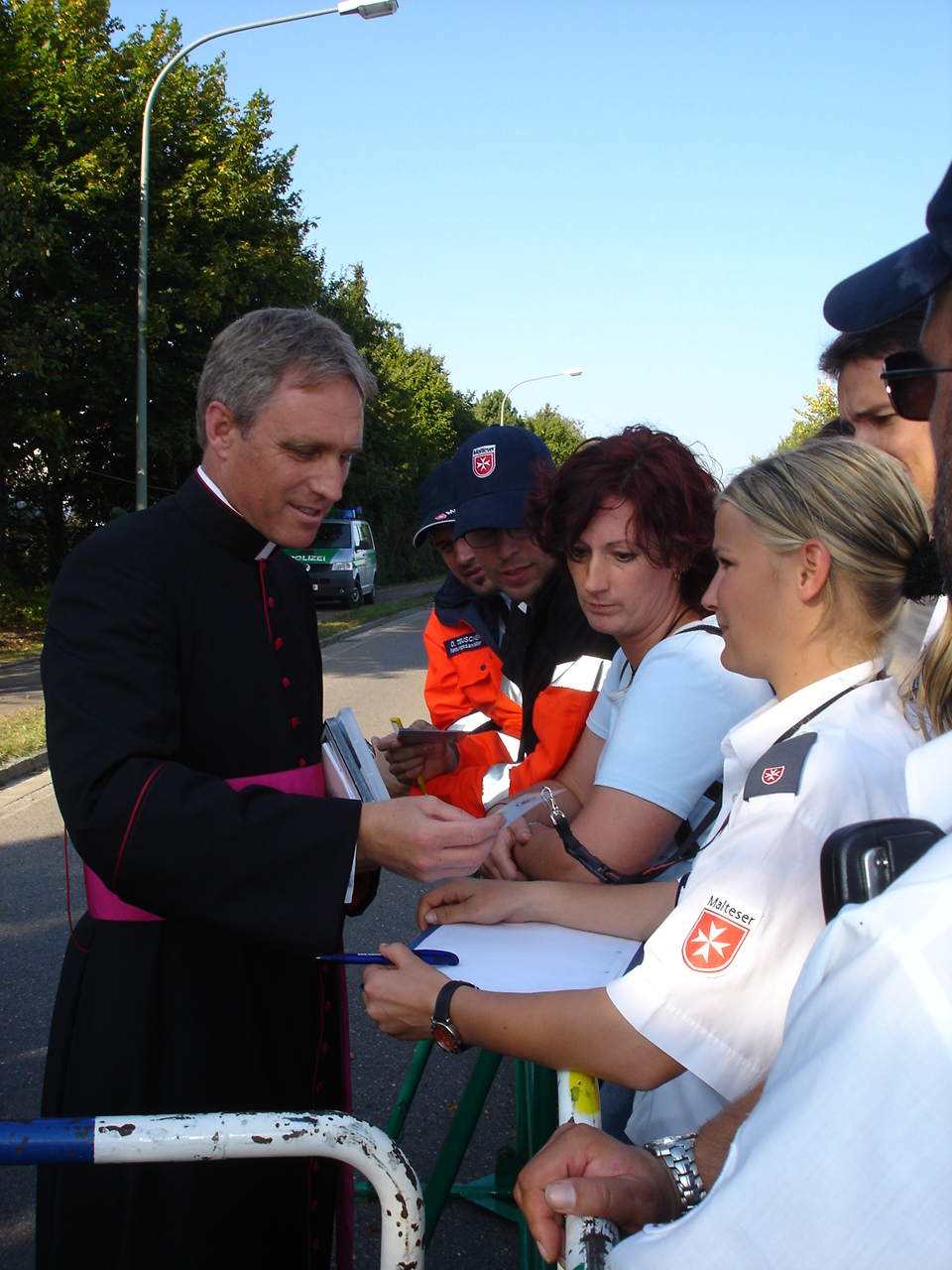
Msgr. Gänswein greeting Malteser International helpers in 2006

Gänswein said he had known about the Pope's plan to resign for "quite some time beforehand" and had tried to change his mind, but "Pope Benedict had reached a decision. He was not to be shaken". He said the news felt like "an amputation" and that "Accepting and coming to terms with my new role is painful". He resented that the press welcomed Pope Francis’ decision not to live in the papal apartments and said that "Benedict didn’t live in the papal apartments for egotistical reasons – he was also very modest". After several months working for Francis he said "At the beginning of each day, I find myself once again waiting to see what will be different today". Then after 9 o’clock in the evening he handles Benedict's affairs and correspondence.

On the first anniversary of the resignation of Pope Benedict XVI, Gänswein said that "I am certain, indeed convinced, that history will offer a judgment that will be different from what one often read in the last years of his pontificate because the sources are clear and clarity springs from them." In 2016 he said that "Vatileaks" or other issues had "little or nothing" to do with Benedict's resignation. Gänswein said that Francis and Benedict are not two popes "in competition" with one another, but represent one "expanded" Petrine Office with an "active" member and a "contemplative" one. He said that Benedict had not abandoned the papacy like Pope Celestine V in the 13th century but rather sought to continue his in a more appropriate way given his frailty and that "Therefore, from 11 February 2013, the papal ministry is not the same as before. It is and remains the foundation of the Catholic Church; and yet it is a foundation that Benedict XVI has profoundly and lastingly transformed by his exceptional pontificate."

=== Election of Pope Francis ===
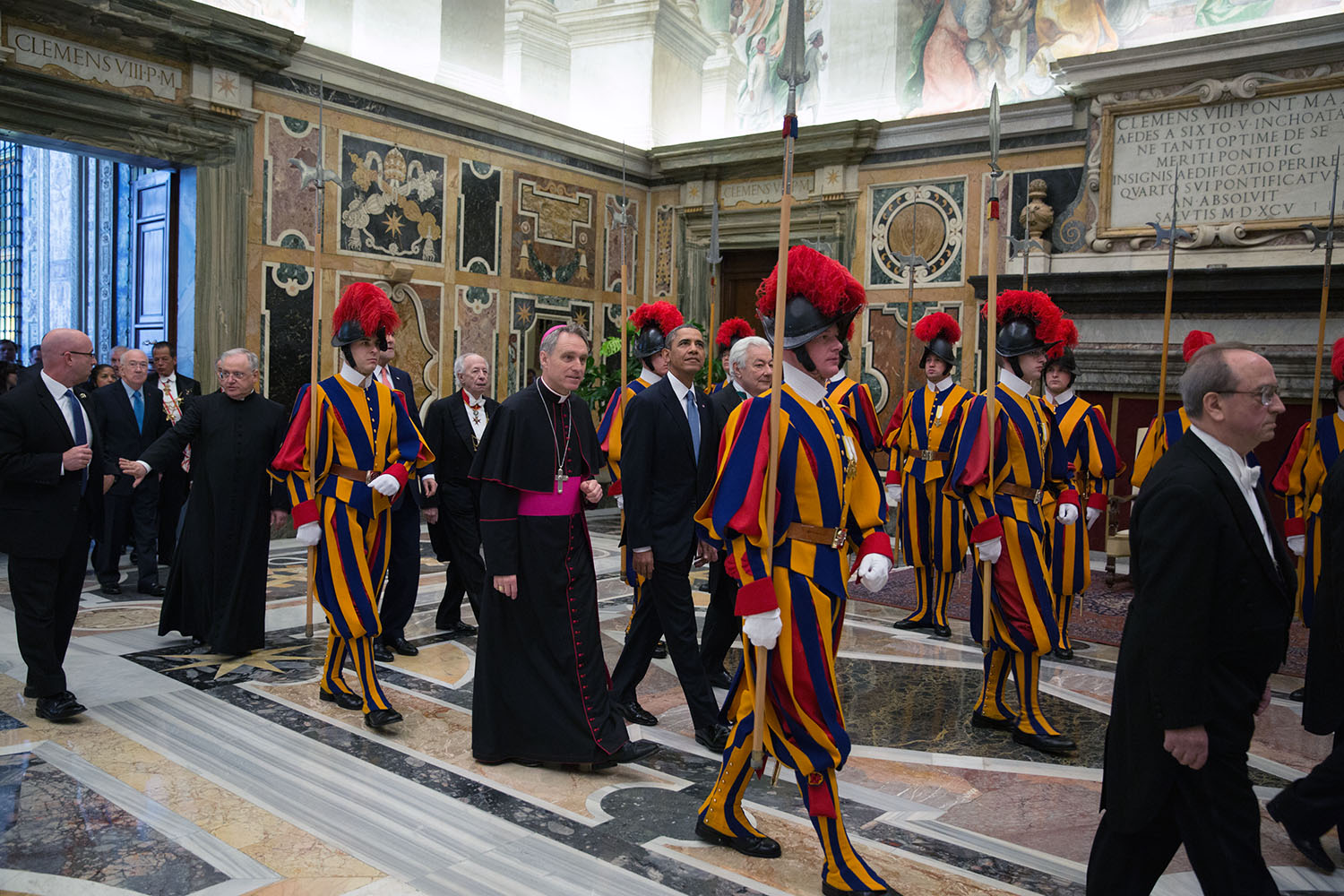
Archbishop Gänswein escorts President Obama to an audience with Pope Francis

Asked by German television network ZDF on March 13, 2014, whether the election of Pope Francis at the conclave the previous year had surprised him, Archbishop Gänswein said, "Well, yes, as I had favoured other candidates. I was wrong, but then so were other people." He went on to say that at the moment the Pope is the darling of the media "but that won't always be the case". He added that the Pope is not "everybody's darling".

=== Relationship between Benedict and Francis ===
In January 2015, Gänswein denied a rumour that Pope Emeritus Benedict XVI had met the previous autumn with conservative cardinals concerned that the Synod of Bishops on the Family might allow civilly remarried Catholics access to the Eucharist. He called it "pure invention". He said Francis' renewed emphasis on pastoral care meant no change in doctrine and said: "The pope is the first guarantor and keeper of the doctrine of the Church and, at the same time, the first shepherd, the first pastor."

In July 2017, some commentators interpreted a statement by Benedict as criticism of Francis. Gänswein called them "stupid people" and said they engaged in "fantasy". He said that "The emeritus pope was deliberately exploited" and that "They want to exploit him. But all this will be useless."

In 2019, after Bishop Evaristo Pascoal Spengler of Marajó, Brazil, told reporters that revisions Benedict made to canon law in 2009 could allow the ordination of women deacons, Gänswein said that assertion was "totally absurd and wrong". He said he had not spoken to Benedict about the matter and his comments "come only from me".

In his 2023 book, Nothing but the Truth: My Life Beside Benedict XVI, Gänswein wrote that Benedict was "surprised" that Francis never responded to a 2016 public letter by four cardinals. After Francis sent Benedict the text of an interview he had given and asked for Benedict's comments, Benedict, according to Gänswein, replied with annotations that critiqued Francis' responses on abortion and homosexuality. Gänswein also wrote that Benedict felt Francis' decision to restrict the use of the Latin Mass was "a mistake". The Pope answered to such allegations in the book-interview El Sucesor of Spanish Vatican correspondent Javier Martínez-Brocal, lamenting that the book was published on the day Benedict's funeral and accusing Gänswein of "lack of nobility and humanity". Similar criticism came from Cardinal Walter Kasper.

=== Dispute with Cardinal Sarah ===
In January 2020, Gänswein asked Cardinal Robert Sarah to have his publishers remove Pope Benedict's name as co-author with Sarah of a book about priestly celibacy, and to remove Benedict's name as author of the book's introduction and conclusions. He said Benedict had not participated in the writing nor authorized the use of his name. He characterized the problem as "a question of misunderstanding, without casting doubt on the good faith of Cardinal Sarah". Sarah had already denied that characterization of Benedict's role, but then asked his publishers to make changes in how Benedict's participation was represented, though his U.S. publisher refused to make any adjustment.

Following his dispute with Sarah, Gänswein ceased to perform the public functions of his position as prefect of the papal household. He no longer appeared alongside Pope Francis at the pope's weekly audiences, nor greeted heads of state and the pope's other most important visitors. His title did not change. The Holy See Press Office said Gänswein's role reflected a "redistribution of the various commitments and duties" of papal household staff.

=== 2014 Extraordinary General Synod ===
In an interview in advance of the October 2014 synod of bishops on the family, Gänswein was asked about allowing divorced and remarried Catholics to receive communion. He said "this is a very delicate question, at stake is the sacramental matrimony that according to Catholic doctrine cannot be dissolved, just like the love of God for man. As far as I can see Pope Francis is following the line of his predecessors whose teaching on matrimony is very clear."

=== Curial reform ===
In April 2015, Gänswein said: “I personally can see no significant reason which would necessitate a reform of the Curia at the moment. One or two changes have been made but that is part of the normal run of things. To speak of ‘Curial reform’ is, if I may say so, somewhat of an exaggeration.” Asked whether the Vatican and the church in general are polarised at the moment, he said "There is no polarisation as far as I can see and I haven’t experienced any. Certain measures here and there have been criticised and if the criticism is justified, that can surely benefit the general climate."

In 2017, asked about the dismissal of Cardinal Gerhard Müller from his post as prefect of the Congregation for the Doctrine of the Faith, Gänswein said: "I don't want to comment on a papal staff decision. But when I heard about it I was really most upset. He is, after all, a close personal friend."

=== Doctor of the Church ===
In January 2023, Cardinal Angelo Bagnasco proposed that Pope Benedict XVI be declared a doctor of the Church "as soon as possible", in view of his theological intelligence and contribution to the formation of current doctrine of the Catholic Church, such as the new catechism. In January 2024, Archbishop Gänswein also spoke in favor of the pontiff's canonization and his elevation to the status of doctor of the church.

In January 2026, Gänswein revealed that he now prays to Benedict XVI rather than for him, seeking the late pope's intercession. "I notice that I do not pray so much for him, but to him, asking for his help," he said at an event in Vilnius, Lithuania. He also expressed hope that a beatification cause for Benedict would open soon.

=== Views on Relativism ===
In October 2025, Gänswein delivered the keynote address at a conference in Šiluva, Lithuania, dedicated to the principles of the Šiluva Declaration, echoing his late mentor's famous warning against what Benedict XVI had called the "dictatorship of relativism." Drawing on Ratzinger's philosophy, which he described as a "constant theme" in the late pope's work, Gänswein argued that when faith or reason is diminished, it leads to "pathologies and the disintegration of the human person." He characterized relativism as "an expression of weak and narrow-minded thinking," rooted in both a false pride in denying that humans can know the truth and a false humility in refusing to accept it. He further described relativism as "a creeping poison" of modernity that, amplified by social media, blinds people to truth and their ultimate purpose.

=== Leo XIV ===
Following the election of Pope Leo XIV, Archbishop Ganswein stated the new pope will build bridges but, “will do so in a different context and in a different style than Francis. There are strong tensions in the Church today, and there are terrible conflicts in the world. I believe that what is needed now is clarity in doctrine. The confusion of these years must be overcome."

== Distinctions ==
- Bavaria: Bavarian Order of Merit
- Romania: Knight Commander of the Order of the Star of Romania
- Italy: Grand Officer of the Order of Merit of the Italian Republic
- Germany: Knight Grand cross in the Order of Merit of the Federal Republic of Germany
- Austria: Decoration of Honour for Services to the Republic of Austria

== Arms ==
Coat of arms of Georg Gänswein
Notes As a member of the Papal Household, Gänswein's arms included those of the reigning pope on the left. The coat of arms was designed and adopted when he was consecrated as Bishop on 6 January 2013 and modified when Francis succeeded Benedict in March 2013. As he is no longer a member of the Papal Household, his coat of arms no longer includes that of Pope Francis. Adopted 2023 Escutcheon 7-pointed star above the draconian serpent. Motto TESTIMONIUM PERHIBERE VERITATI (To bear witness to the truth, John 18:37) Symbolism The 7-pointed star represents the Blessed Virgin Mary. The draconian serpent represents the Devil being slain by Saint George. Previous versions Coat of arms during the papacy of Pope Benedict XVI Coat of arms as a member of the Papal Household of Pope Francis

== Notes ==
Catholic Church titles
Preceded by Stanisław Dziwisz	Private Secretary to the Pope; 19 April 2005 – 28 February 2013	Succeeded by Alfred Xuereb
Preceded by Giuseppe Bertello	— TITULAR — Archbishop of Urbs Salvia (pro hac vice); 7 December 2012 – present	Incumbent
Preceded by James Michael Harvey	Prefect of the Pontifical Household; 7 December 2012 – 28 February 2023	Succeeded by Petar Rajič
Diplomatic posts
Preceded by Petar Rajič	Apostolic Nuncio to Lithuania and Estonia and Latvia; 2024 –	Incumbent
