= Canada–Holy See relations =

- Canada: Vatican City

Although the Roman Catholic Church has been territorially established in Canada since the founding of New France in the early 16th century, official relations between Canada and the Holy See were only established during the pontificate of Pope Paul VI in 1969.

In part, this is because the Holy See had lost its territorial sovereignty over the Papal States during the pontificate of Pope Pius IX and that territorial sovereignty over Vatican City State was only established by the Lateran Treaty of 1929. Also, relations with neighbouring Italy were poor during the regime of Benito Mussolini, and they were only re-established after World War II ended in 1945.

Areas of cooperation between Ottawa and Rome have traditionally included education, health care, the struggle against poverty and international diplomacy. Before the establishment of the welfare state, Church involvement was evident in many sectors of Canadian society. Today, Canada's international preoccupations in favor of justice and peace are often in line with those of Rome, which favors dialogue on a global level.

Pope John Paul II was the first pope to visit Canada in 1984 and re-visited Canada in 1987 and 2002.

In April 2022, Pope Francis apologized to the Indigenous people of Canada for the role of the Catholic Church in the Canadian Indian residential school system. He said that he will visit Canada in July 2022. Pope Francis arrived in Edmonton, Alberta, Canada on July 24, 2022. On Monday July 25th he visited Maskwacis and according to Grand Chief Wilton Littlechild prayed in a small chapel for children lost in the residential schools. He prayed again in the cemetery containing the graves of children who died in one of the largest residential schools in Canada. Then at a ceremony attended by many Indigenous elders he apologized in the course of the ceremony which was replete with traditional song, dance and ceremony. The Pope was given a traditional headdress by Chief Littlechild.

== 17th and 18th centuries ==
After the British conquest of 1759, relations with Rome were temporarily frozen and Jesuits were forbidden from entering the country. However, religious tolerance was quickly re-established under the 1774 Quebec Act, owing to the anti-American sentiment of colonial administrators. Before the 1774 Quebec Act, Lower Canada's remaining bishops began to die as they succumbed to old age, and new bishops and cardinals were blocked from entering by British Administrators. After the last death in 1768, the British colonial governor reversed his decision and began to allow limited numbers of Catholic Administrator to enter, paving the way for the Quebec Act 1774. As a result of the religious freedoms it granted to Catholics, Colonial Americans in the 13 colonies (because of their anti-Catholic stance) labelled it as one of the "Intolerable Acts" an influence to the start of the American Revolution.

== 19th century ==
John A. Macdonald, Canada's first prime minister, is thought to have had problematic relations with the Church, as it was manifest by the anger of many Catholics against Macdonald during the Louis Riel affair, a conflict which had many sectarian undertones.

In the 19th century, Pope Leo XIII had an apostolic delegation and did send diplomatic envoys to important socio-political events in Canada. Pope Leo took a strong interest in Canadian affairs and wrote the encyclical Affari Vos on the Manitoba Schools Question.

== 20th century ==
Wilfrid Laurier, Canada's first francophone prime minister, had genuinely good relations with Pope Pius X, and during his time as PM the Church went through a relatively prosperous period in terms of vocations and social influence.

Pierre Trudeau, another Quebec Catholic PM, was raised as a strict Catholic, but later cooled to the institution after the publication of Humanae Vitae in 1968. After 1968, Trudeau passed a number of liberal laws on divorce, birth control, adultery, homosexuality and abortion, laws which have profoundly liberalized, modernized and secularized Canadian society.

Governors General of Canada have sometimes been Catholic. Jules Léger was the brother of Cardinal Paul-Émile Léger. Jeanne Sauvé was a former member of the Catholic Action movement. Georges Vanier was a servant of God who has been proposed for beatification.

In practice, abortion was only completely legalized under the government of Conservative Catholic Brian Mulroney, who personally objected to it but could not prevent a 1988 Supreme Court decision removing all previous restrictions to the procedure.

== Resident diplomatic missions ==
- Canada has an embassy to the Holy See in Rome.
- Holy See has an Apostolic Nunciature in Ottawa.
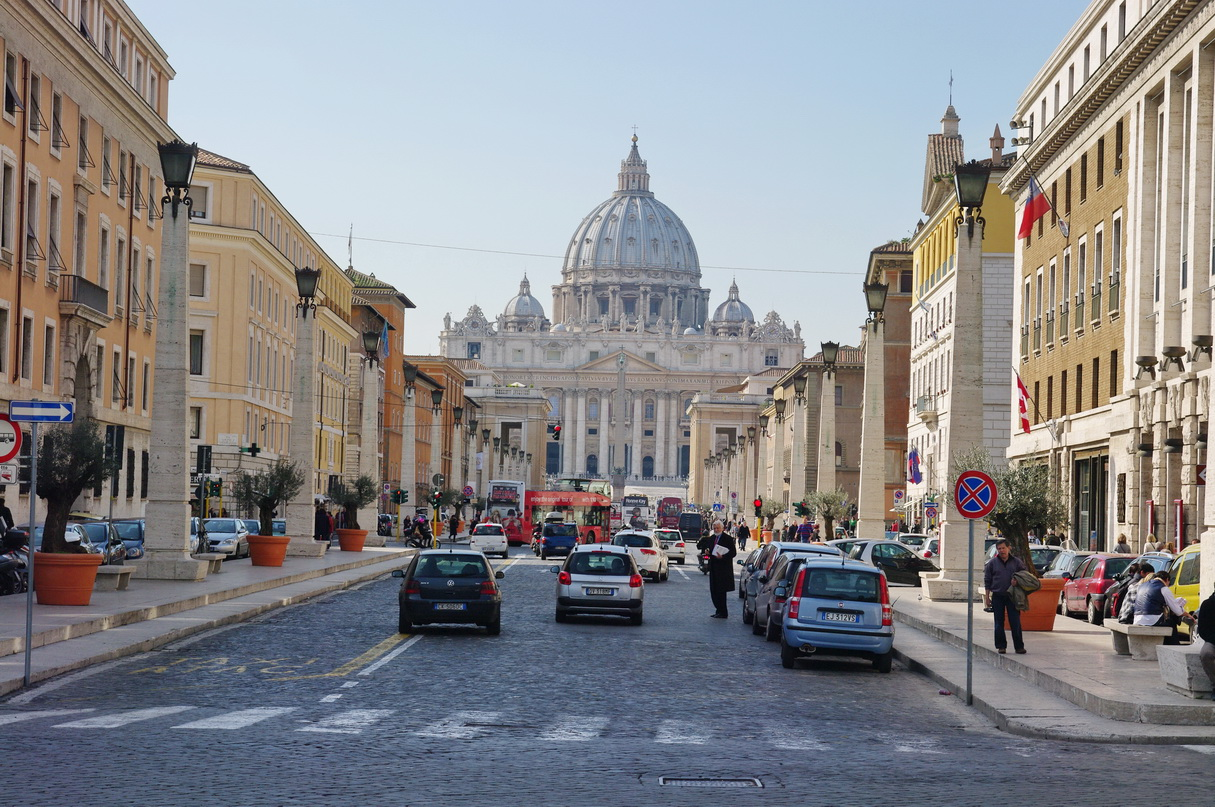
Embassy of Canada to the Holy See

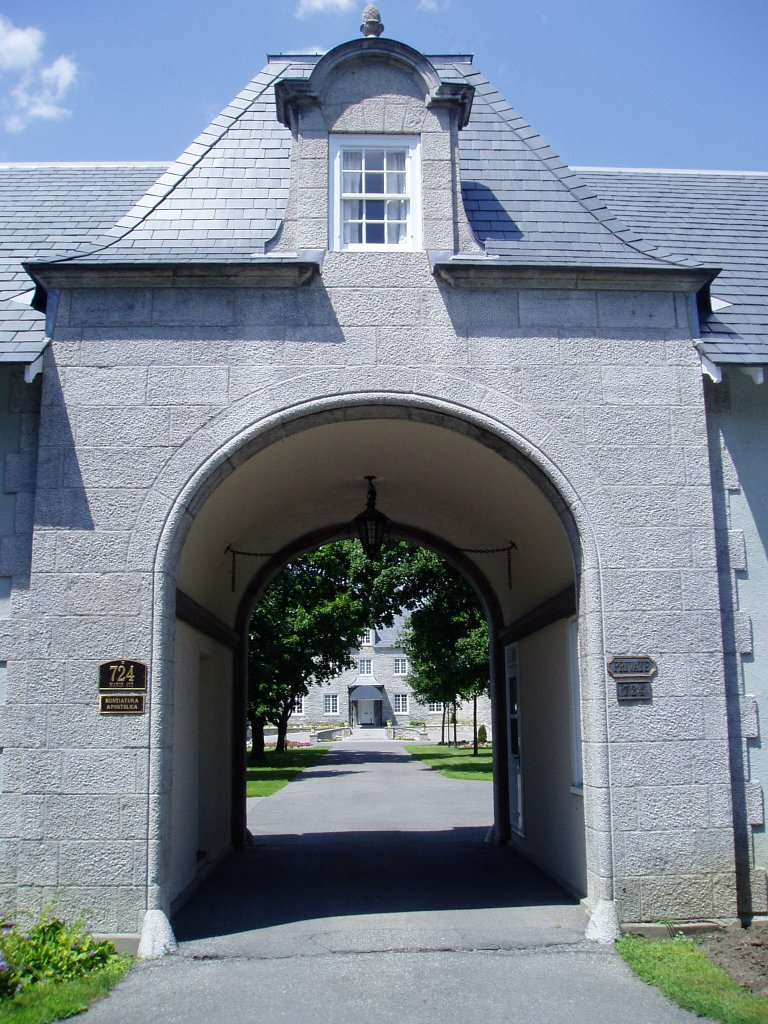
Apostolic Nunciature in Ottawa

== See also ==
- Apostolic Nunciature to Canada

== Resources ==
- Ciani, Adriano Ercole. "The Establishment of Diplomatic Relations Between Canada and the Holy See, 1945-1969 (MA Thesis, University of New Brunswick, 2005)
