= Augustin Bea =

German Jesuit priest and scholar and cardinal (1881–1968)

His Eminence Augustin Bea SJ
- President of the Secretariat for Promoting Christian Unity
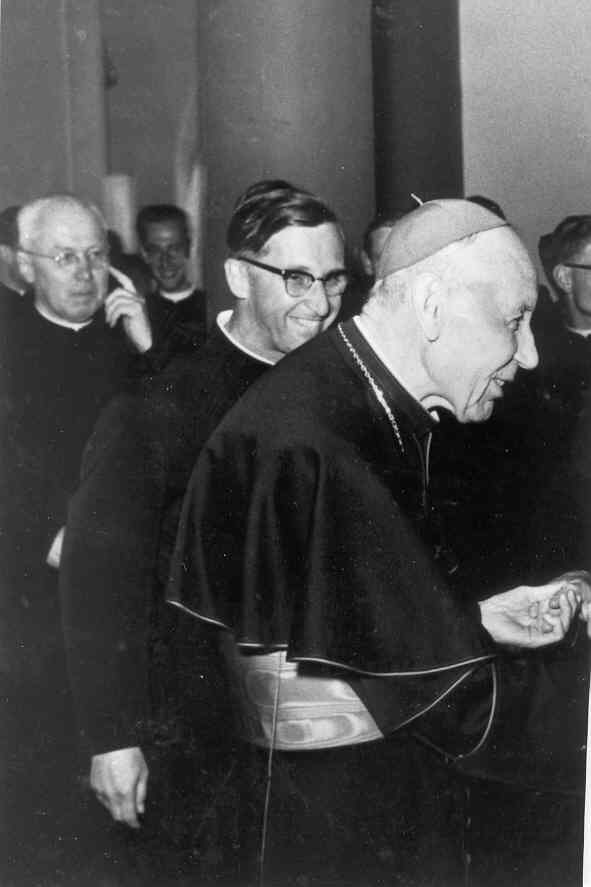
- Bea with zucchetto in 1963
- Appointed: 6 June 1960
- Term ended: 16 November 1968
- Predecessor: None
- Successor: Johannes Willebrands
- Other post: Cardinal–Deacon of San Saba
- Previous posts: Provincial Superior of the Society of Jesus in Germany (1921-1924); Rector of the Pontifical Biblical Institute (1930-1949); Titular Archbishop of Germania in Numidia (1962–1963); President of the Pontifical Commission for the Neo-Vulgate (1965-1968)

Orders
- Ordination: 25 August 1912 by Hermann Jürgens
- Consecration: 19 April 1962 by Pope John XXIII
- Created cardinal: 14 December 1959 by Pope John XXIII
- Rank: Cardinal-Deacon

Personal details
- Born: Augustin Bea; 28 May 1881 Riedböhringen, German Empire
- Died: 16 November 1968 (aged 87) Rome, Italy
- Denomination: Roman Catholic
- Motto: In nomine domini Jesu (In the name of the Lord Jesus)
- Coat of arms

Augustin Bea SJ (28 May 1881 – 16 November 1968) was a German Jesuit priest, cardinal, and scholar at the Pontifical Gregorian University, specialising in biblical studies and biblical archaeology. He also served as the personal confessor of Pope Pius XII.

He was made a cardinal in 1959 by Pope John XXIII and served as the first president of the Secretariat for Promoting Christian Unity from 1960 until his death. Bea was a leading biblical scholar and ecumenist, who greatly influenced Christian-Jewish relations during the Second Vatican Council in Nostra aetate. Bea published several books, mostly in Latin, and 430 articles.

== Biography ==
Styles of Augustin Bea
- Reference style: His Eminence
- Spoken style: Your Eminence
- Informal style: Cardinal
- See: Germania in Numidia (titular)

=== Early life and education ===
Bea was born in Riedböhringen, today a part of Blumberg, Baden-Württemberg; his father was a carpenter. He studied at the universities of Freiburg, Innsbruck, Berlin, and at Valkenburg, the Jesuit house of studies in the Netherlands. On 18 April 1902, he joined the Society of Jesus, as he "was much inclined to the scholarly life". Bea was ordained a priest on 25 August 1912, and finished his studies in 1914.

=== Priestly ministry ===
Bea served as superior of the Jesuit residence in Aachen until 1917, at which time he began teaching Scripture at Valkenburg. From 1921 to 1924, Bea was the provincial superior of Germany. Superior General Wlodimir Ledóchowski then sent him to Rome, where he worked as the superior of the Biennial House of Formation (1924–1928), professor at the Pontifical Biblical Institute (1924–1949), and rector of the Institute of Superior Ecclesiastical Studies (1924–1930). In 1930, Bea was named rector of the Pontifical Biblical Institute, a post in which he remained for nineteen years.

=== Consistory and episcopal ministry ===
When Pius XII proposed appointing Bea to the College of Cardinals in 1946, Superior General Jean-Baptiste Janssens spoke out against it, as many felt the Holy See was showing preferential treatment to the Jesuits. Raised to the rank of cardinal before his episcopal consecration, Bea was created Cardinal-Deacon of S. Saba by Pope John XXIII in the consistory of 14 December 1959. On 6 June 1960, he was appointed the first president of the newly formed Secretariat for Promoting Christian Unity, a Curial organisation charged with ecumenical affairs. It was not until two years later that, on 5 April 1962, Cardinal Bea was appointed a bishop: the Titular Archbishop of Germania in Numidia. He received his consecration on the following 19 April from John XXIII himself, with Cardinals Giuseppe Pizzardo and Benedetto Aloisi Masella serving as co-consecrators, in the Lateran Basilica. He resigned his post as titular archbishop in 1963, one year after the Second Vatican Council was convened.

Cardinal Bea was one of the electors in the 1963 papal conclave which elected Pope Paul VI, and was confirmed as the president of the Secretariat for Promoting Christian Unity (renamed the Pontifical Council for Promoting Christian Unity by Pope John Paul II on 28 June 1988) on 3 January 1966.

In 1963 he invited Protestant theologian Karl Barth to attend the Second Vatican Council as an observer, but Barth was unable to do so due to health reasons.

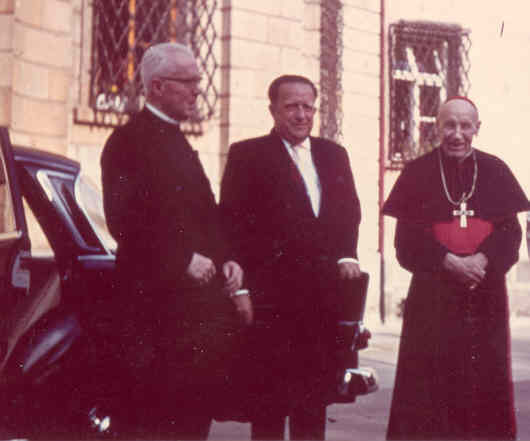
Cardinal Bea liked to visit his native Black Forest

Cardinal Bea died from a bronchial infection in Rome, at the age of 87. He was buried in the apse of the parish church of Saint Genesius in his native Riedböhringen, where there is a museum honouring him.

== Impact and legacy ==
The encyclical Divino afflante Spiritu (1943) was very much shaped by Bea and Jacques Marie Vosté, O.P. (secretary of the Pontifical Biblical Commission).

Bea was highly influential at the Second Vatican Council in the 1960s as a decisive force in the drafting of Nostra aetate, which repudiated anti-Semitism. In 1963, he held secret talks with Abraham Joshua Heschel, promoting Catholic–Jewish dialogue. John Borelli, a Vatican II historian, has observed that, "It took the will of John XXIII and the perseverance of Cardinal Bea to impose the declaration on the Council". During a session of the Central Preparatory Commission, he also rejected the proposition that the Council Fathers take an oath composed of the Nicene Creed and the anti-modernist oath. After Alfredo Ottaviani, the strongly conservative head of the Holy Office, presented his draft of the schema on the sources of Divine Revelation, Bea claimed that it "would close the door to intellectual Europe and the outstretched hands of friendship in the old and new world"; The Pope appointed Ottaviani and Bea to be the co-chairs of a commission set up to revise the draft in order to resolve the deadlock, leading ultimately to the presentation of revelation comprising both scripture and tradition which featured in the Dogmatic Constitution on Divine Revelation (Dei Verbum).

Bea was the author of The Church and the Jewish People (New York: Harper & Row, 1966) and marking the 50th anniversary of his death, Pope Francis called Cardinal Bea "an outstanding figure" who should not only be remembered for what he did, but also the way he did it. "He remains", the Pope said, "a model and a source of inspiration for ecumenical and interreligious dialogue, and in an eminent way for the "intra-familial" dialogue with Judaism".

== Awards ==
- Bavarian Order of Merit
- 1954 Grand Cross of Merit of the Federal Republic of Germany
- Grand Cross of the French Legion of Honour
- Grand Cross of the Greek Order of George I
- 1960 Grand Cross of Merit of the Federal Republic of Germany
- 1965 International Prize for the brotherhood of the Fellowship Commission (International Fellowship Award), Philadelphia, Pennsylvania, US
- 1966 Peace Prize of the German Book Trade, along with Willem Visser 't Hooft
- 1967 Human Relations Award for the Society for Family of Man (New York)

== Published works ==
Augustin Bea published 430 articles in the years 1918–1968. They dealt with archaeological issues, exegesis of Old Testament texts, Mariology, papal encyclicals, the unity of Christians, anti-Semitism, Vatican II, relations to Protestantism and the eastern Orthodox Churches, and ecumenicism.

Among his books:

- Maria in der Offenbarung Katholische Marienkunde Bd. I Hugo Rahner and Augustin Bea, Schöningh, Paderborn, 1947
- Imagen de Maria en la Antigua Alianza, Buenos Aires, Revista Biblica, 1954
- De Pentateucho Institutiones Biblicaa Scholis Accomodatae, Romae, 1933
- De Inspiratione Sacrae Scripturae, Romae, 1935
- Archeologica biblica, Romae, 1939
- La nuova traduzione Latina del Salterio, Romae 1946
- Liber Ecclesiasticae qui ab Hebraeis appelatur Qohelet, Romae, 1950
- Canticum Canticorum Salamonis, Romae, 1953
- Cor Jesu Commentationes in Litteras encyclicas Pii Papae XII Haurietis Aquas, Herder Freiburg, 1959
- Die Kirche und das jüdische Volk (German translation of La Chiesa e il popolo ebraico), Herder Freiburg, 1966

Records
Preceded by Augusto da Silva	Oldest living member of the College of Cardinals; 14 August – 16 November 1968	Succeeded by Giuseppe Pizzardo
