= Lorenzo Schioppa =

Italian prelate

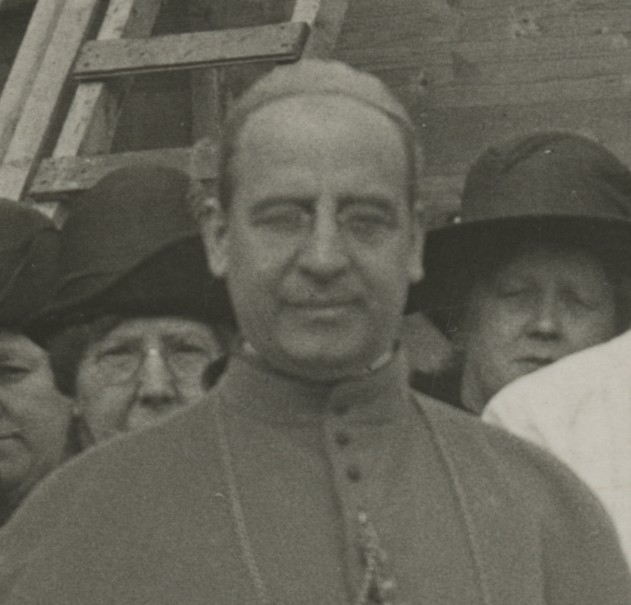
Lorenzo Schioppa (1926)

Lorenzo Schioppa (10 November 1871 – 23 April 1935) was an Italian prelate of the Catholic Church who worked in the diplomatic service of the Holy See. He became an archbishop in 1920 and served as Apostolic Nuncio in Hungary, the Netherlands, and Lithuania.

== Biography ==
Lorenzo Schioppa was born on 10 November 1871 in Naples, Italy. He was ordained on 18 April 1891. His early assignments in the diplomatic service took him to the nunciature in Bavaria beginning in November 1912, where he worked for Eugenio Pacelli, the future Pope Pius XII, during the Bolshevik takeover in Munich in 1918–1919.

On 10 August 1920, Pope Benedict XV appointed him titular archbishop of Mocissus and Apostolic Nuncio to Hungary. He received his episcopal consecration on 22 August 1920 from Cardinal Andreas Frühwirth.

On 3 May 1925, Pope Pius XI named him Apostolic Internuncio to the Netherlands.

On 10 March 1927, Pope Pius gave him the additional responsibility of the first Apostolic Internuncio to Lithuania. He was replaced in Lithuania by Riccardo Bartoloni on 30 April 1928.

He was still Internuncio to the Netherlands when he died in The Hague on 23 April 1935 at the age of 63.
