= Apostolic Nunciature to Estonia =

Official diplomatic representation of the Holy See in Estonia

The Apostolic Nunciature to Estonia is an ecclesiastical office of the Catholic Church in Estonia. It is a diplomatic post of the Holy See, whose representative is called the Apostolic Nuncio with the rank of an ambassador. The title Apostolic Nuncio to Estonia is held by the prelate appointed Apostolic Nuncio to Lithuania; he resides in Lithuania.

== Representatives ==
Apostolic delegates to the Baltic States

- Edward O'Rourke (8 December 1920 - December 1921)
- Antonino Zecchini (20 October 1922 - 22 October 1933)

Apostolic nuncios

- Antonino Arata (12 July 1935 - August 1940)
- Justo Mullor García (30 November 1991 - 2 April 1997)
- Erwin Josef Ender (9 July 1997 - 19 May 2001)
- Peter Stephan Zurbriggen (25 October 2001 - 14 January 2009)
- Luigi Bonazzi (14 March 2009 - 18 December 2013)
- Pedro López Quintana (22 March 2014 - 4 March 2019)
- Petar Rajič (6 August 2019 - 11 March 2024)
- Georg Gänswein (24 June 2024 – )

== See also ==
- Foreign relations of the Holy See
- List of diplomatic missions of the Holy See
