= Germania in Numidia =

Germania in Numidia is a former ancient city and Roman bishopric and current Latin Catholic titular see. It was in the Roman province of Numidia.

== History ==
Germania was thought to have been located near modern Ksar-El-Kelb? in present-day Algeria. It was sufficiently important within the Roman province of Numidia to be a suffragan bishopric of the Metropolitan Archdiocese of Cirta (modern Constantine), but faded.

== Bishopric ==
=== Ancient bishops ===
A bishopric was established here During the Roman Empire. It stopped functioning in the 7th century with the Islamic expansion. Known bishops include

- Innocence (fl 411)
- Crescenzo (fl. 484)

=== Titular see ===
The diocese was nominally restored as a titular see in 1933. It has had the following (near-consecutive) incumbents, both of the lowest (episcopal) and intermediary (archiepiscopal) ranks:

- Augustin Bea, S.J. (1962)
- José del Carmen Valle Gallardo (1963–1966)
- Ângelo Maria Rivato, S.J. (1967–1978)
- Domingo Salvador Castagna (1978–1984), Auxiliary Bishop of Buenos Aires
- Isaías Duarte Cancino (1985–1988), Auxiliary Bishop of Bucaramanga
- Erwin Josef Ender (1990–2022), Apostolic Nuncio (papal ambassador) emeritus to Germany
- Paul Lee Kyung-sang (2024-present), Auxiliary Bishop of Seoul

== See also ==
- List of Catholic titular sees

== Source and External links ==
- GigaCatholic, with titular incumbent biography links
