= Riedern am Wald =

Quarter of Ühlingen-Birkendorf, Germany

Coordinates: 47°43′N 8°18′E

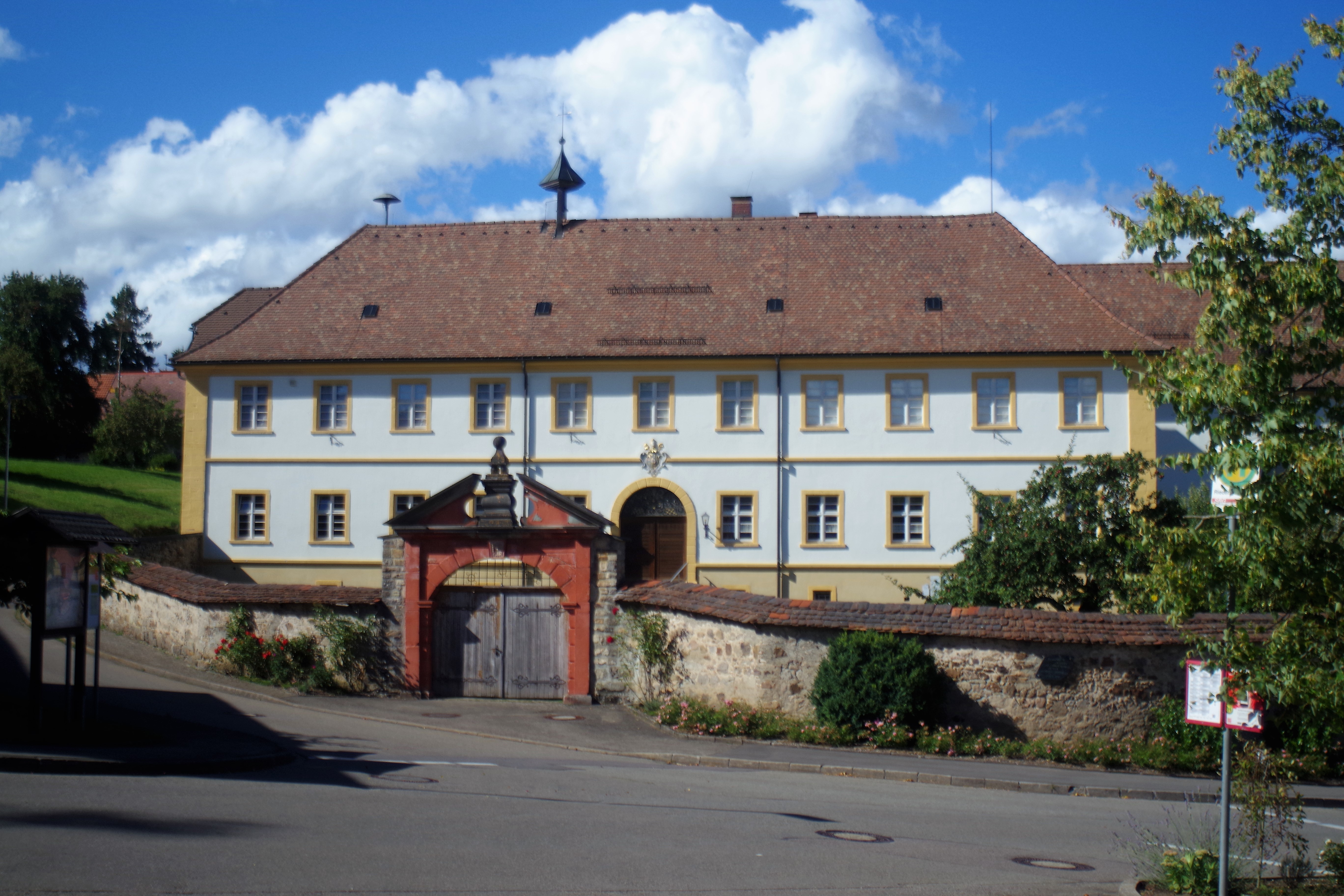
Main building of the monastery

Riedern am Wald is an Ortsteil of the municipality of Ühlingen-Birkendorf in the Waldshut district of Baden-Württemberg, Germany. Notable people from the area include artist Heinrich Ernst Kromer and Pope Benedict XVI's personal secretary, Msgr. Georg Gänswein.
