= Apostolic Nunciature to Canada =

Diplomatic post of the Holy See

Apostolic Nunciature in Ottawa
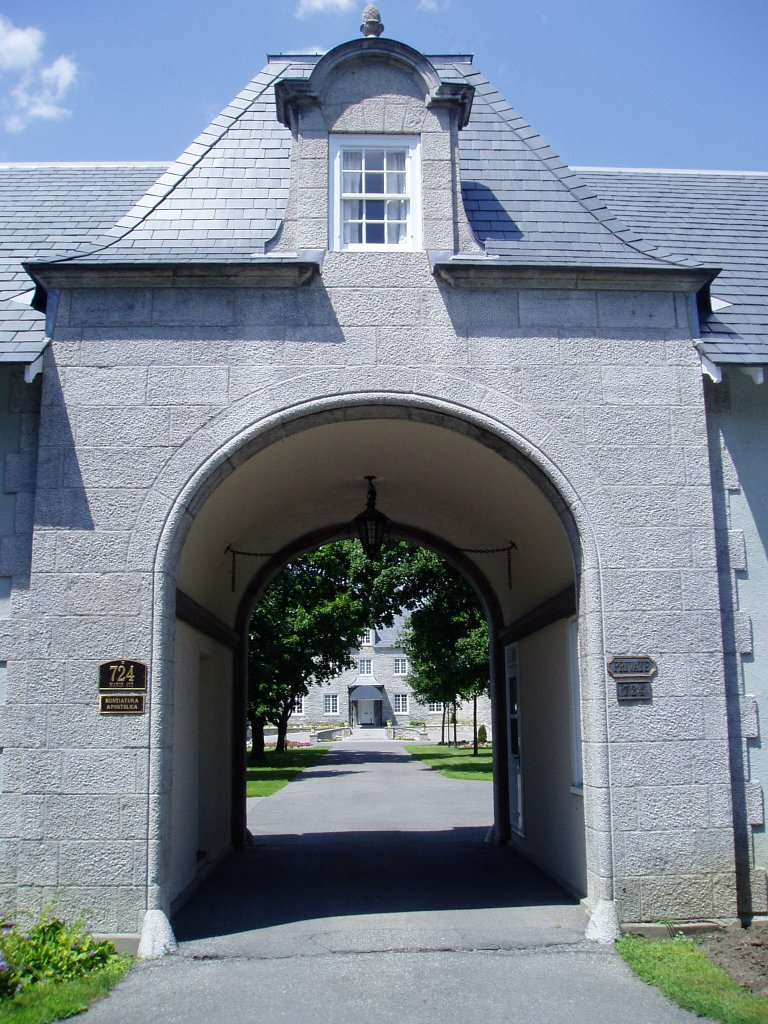
- The gate house of the nunciature with the manor in the distance
- Location: Ottawa
- Address: 724 Manor Avenue, Rockcliffe Park
- Coordinates: 45.455710°N 75.683119°W
- Apostolic Nuncio: Ivan Jurkovič
- Website: http://www.nuntiatura.ca/

The Apostolic Nunciature to Canada is the diplomatic mission of the Holy See to Canada. It is headed by the Apostolic Nuncio to Canada, which is both an ecclesiastical and diplomatic office, with the rank of ambassador.

The Holy See first created a Delegation to Canada and Newfoundland on 3 August 1899. It became the Apostolic Delegation to Canada on 31 March 1949 when the British Dominion of Newfoundland became the tenth province of Canada. Once Canada and the Holy See reached agreement on the establishment of diplomatic relations and the exchange of ambassadors, Pope Paul VI erected the Apostolic Nunciature to Canada on 16 October 1969.

== Property ==
The nunciature was based in a building on Queen Elizabeth Driveway until it purchased Rockcliffe House in 1962. The manor is located on two hectares of grounds and has a large gate house, that was originally the stables and coach house, separating it from the street and several other out buildings.

The first home on the property, built by Duncan Reynier MacNab in 1838–39, was named "Rockcliff House" for its location. This name neighbourhood became known as Rockcliffe Park. In 1868 the property was purchased by Thomas Coltrin Keefer, son-in-law of Thomas McKay, after he had sold Rideau Hall to the government to house the Governor General. Keefer rebuilt and extensively enlarged the house. It remained in the Keefer family 1929 when it was purchased by Cairine Wilson, the first Canadian woman to be named to Senator and her husband Norman. In 1929 the building was renovated in the style of Directoire Manor Houses of France.

The house was included amongst other architecturally interesting and historically significant buildings in Doors Open Ottawa, held June 2 and 3, 2012.

== Papal representatives to Canada ==
Apostolic Delegates to Canada and Newfoundland

- George Michael Conroy (10 April 1877 – 4 August 1878)
- Rafael Merry del Val y Zulueta (10 March 1897 – 21 October 1899)
- Diomede Falconio, O.F.M. Ref. (3 August 1899 – 30 September 1902)
- Donato Sbarretti (26 December 1902 – 29 October 1910)
- Pellegrino Francesco Stagni, O.S.M. (3 November 1910 – 11 June 1918)
- Pietro di Maria (11 June 1918 – 3 June 1926)
- Andrea Cassulo (7 May 1927 – 14 June 1936)
- Ildebrando Antoniutti (14 July 1938 – 21 October 1953)

Apostolic Delegates to Canada

- Giovanni Panico (14 November 1953 – 24 January 1959)
- Sebastiano Baggio (12 March 1959 – 26 May 1964)
- Sergio Pignedoli (1 June 1964 – 10 June 1967)

Apostolic Pro-Nuncios to Canada

- Emanuele Clarizio (12 June 1967 – 19 March 1970)
- Guido Del Mestri (20 June 1970 – 13 August 1975)
- Angelo Palmas (2 September 1975 – 10 March 1990)
- Carlo Curis (28 March 1990 – 1 September 1994)

Apostolic Nuncios

- Carlo Curis (1 September 1994 – 5 February 1999)
- Paolo Romeo (5 February 1999 – 17 April 2001)
- Luigi Ventura (22 June 2001 – 22 September 2009)
- Pedro Lopez Quintana (10 December 2009 – 28 September 2013)
- Luigi Bonazzi (18 December 2013 – 10 December 2020)
- Ivan Jurkovič (5 June 2021 – present)

== See also ==
- Canada–Holy See relations
