= Justo Mullor García =

Spanish prelate

- Titular Archbishop of Volsinium
- Church: Latin Church
- Installed: 28 July 1994
- Term ended: 30 December 2016
- Predecessor: Justin Rigali
- Successor: Alfredo Zecca
- Previous posts: President of the Pontifical Ecclesiastical Academy (2000-2007); Apostolic Nuncio to Mexico (1997-2000); Apostolic Administrator of Estonia (1992-1997); Apostolic Nuncio to Lithuania, Latvia & Estonia (1991-1997); Titular Archbishop of Emerita Augusta (1979-1994); Permanent Observer of the Holy See to the United Nations in Geneva (1985-1991); Apostolic Pro-Nuncio to Niger & Burkina Faso (1979-1985); Apostolic Nuncio to Côte d'Ivoire (1979-1985)

Orders
- Ordination: 8 December 1954 by Antonio Samorè
- Consecration: 16 April 1950 by Karol Józef Wojtyła

Personal details
- Born: 8 May 1932 Los Villares, Second Spanish Republic
- Died: 30 December 2016 (aged 84) Rome, Italy

Justo Mullor García (8 May 1932 – 30 December 2016) was a Spanish prelate of the Catholic Church who spent his career in the diplomatic service of the Holy See and then headed the Vatican's academy for training diplomats.

== Biography ==
Born in los Villares, Jaén, Spain, on 8 May 1932, Justo Mullor García was ordained to the priesthood on 8 December 1954. He entered the diplomatic service of the Holy See and on 21 March 1979 was named titular archbishop of Volsinium. On 22 March 1979, he was named Apostolic Nuncio to the Ivory Coast, on 2 May Apostolic Pro-Nuncio to Upper Volta, and on 25 August Apostolic Pro-Nuncio to Niger. He was later permanent observer of the Holy See to the European Council, permanent observer of the Holy See to the Office of the United Nations Organization in Geneva, and Estonia, Lithuania, Latvia, and Mexico.

He was the Apostolic Nuncio to Mexico when Pope John Paul II appointed him President of the Pontifical Ecclesiastical Academy on 11 February 2000.

Pope John Paul II named him a Consultor to the Secretariat of State on 4 July 2000. He also named him a participant in the 2001 Synod of Bishops.

Pope Benedict XVI accepted his resignation as President of the Ecclesiastical Academy on 13 October 2007.

Pope Benedict named him a member of the Congregation for the Causes of Saints on 22 April 2009.

He died in Rome on 30 December 2016. His remains were interred in the Cathedral of the Incarnation in Almería.
