= Apostolic Nunciature to Lithuania =

Diplomatic post of the Holy See

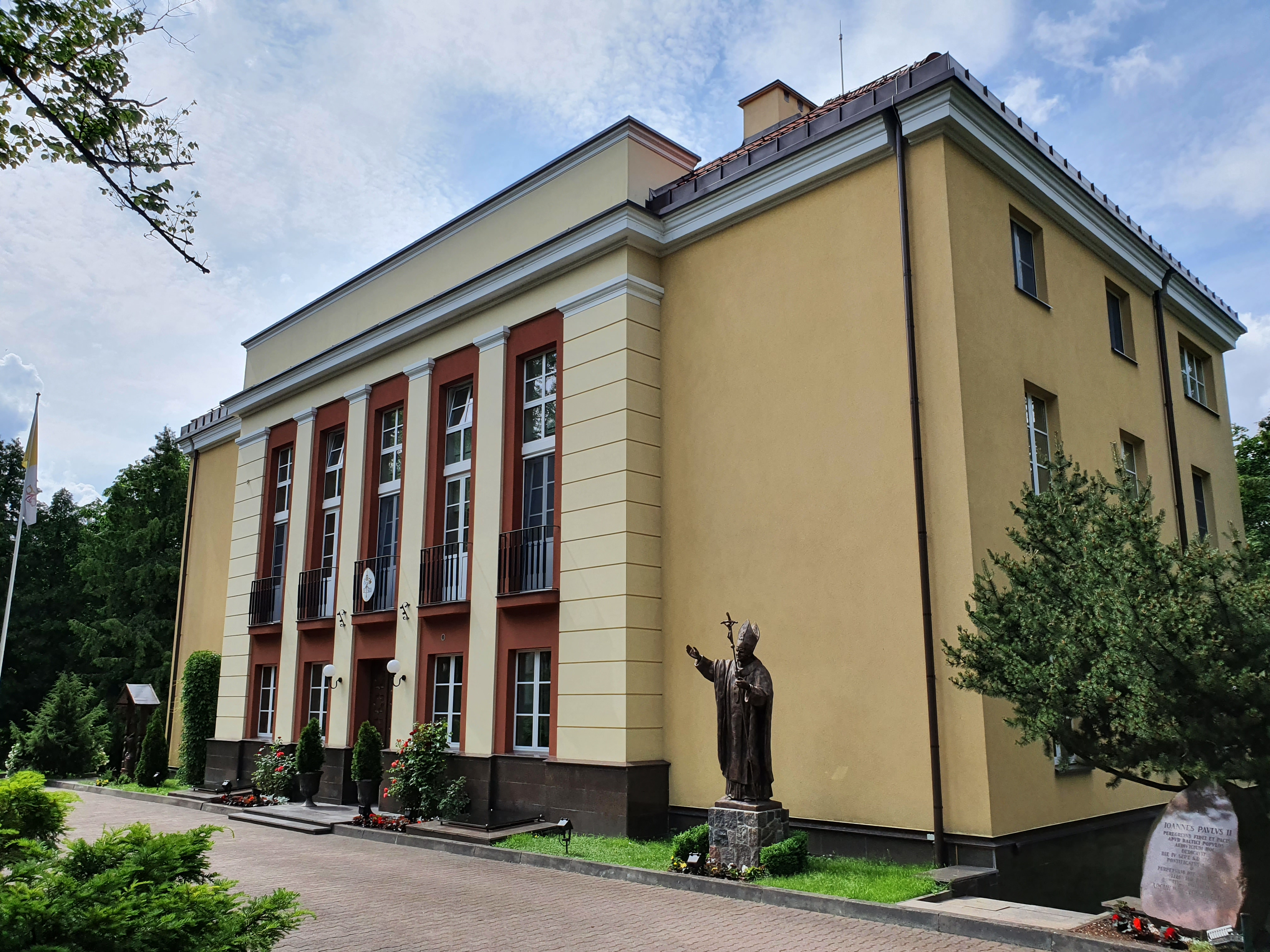
- The Apostolic Nunciature in Vilnius
- Location: Vilnius, Lithuania
- Address: T. Kosciuškos g. 28
- Apostolic Nuncio: Georg Gänswein

The Apostolic Nunciature to Lithuania is an ecclesiastical office of the Catholic Church in Lithuania. It is a diplomatic post of the Holy See, whose representative is called the Apostolic Nuncio with the rank of an ambassador. The Apostolic Nuncio to Lithuania is usually also the Apostolic Nuncio to Estonia and Latvia as well.

== Representatives of the Holy See ==
Apostolic delegates to the Baltic States

- Edward O'Rourke (8 December 1920 – December 1921)
- Antonino Zecchini (20 October 1922 – 7 December 1925)

Apostolic internuncios

- Lorenzo Schioppa (10 March 1927 – 30 April 1928)
- Riccardo Bartoloni (30 April 1928 – 9 April 1933)
  - He supported the local clergy's struggle to protect the independence of the lay Catholic organization Catholic Action from government control. For this he was declared persona non grata and expelled from the country in the summer of 1931.

Apostolic nuncios

- Luigi Centoz (19 February 1940 – 24 August 1940)
- Justo Mullor García (30 November 1991 – 2 April 1997)
- Erwin Josef Ender (9 July 1997 – 19 May 2001)
- Peter Stephan Zurbriggen (25 October 2001 – 14 January 2009)
- Luigi Bonazzi (14 March 2009 – 18 December 2013)
- Pedro López Quintana (8 March 2014 – 4 March 2019)
- Petar Rajič (15 June 2019 – 11 March 2024)
- Georg Gänswein (24 June 2024 – )

== See also ==
- Foreign relations of the Holy See
- List of diplomatic missions of the Holy See
