= Paul Kyung Sang Lee =

South Korean bishop (born 1960)

Most Reverend Paul Kyung Sang Lee
- Auxiliary Bishop of Seoul
- Native name: 폴 이경상
- Church: Catholic Church; Latin Church
- Diocese: Seoul
- Appointed: 24 February 2024
- Other post: Titular Bishop of Germania in Numidia
- Previous post: Judicial Vicar of the archdiocese of Seoul

Orders
- Ordination: 12 February 1988
- Consecration: 11 April 2024 by Peter Chung Soon-taick

Personal details
- Born: Paul Kyung Sang Lee; 1 November 1960 (age 65) Pil-dong, Jung-gu, Seoul, South Korea
- Education: Pontifical Lateran University
- Motto: Vivere In Corde Jesu

Paul Kyung Sang Lee (Korean: 폴 이경상; born 1 November 1960) is a Korean prelate of the Catholic Church who has been auxiliary bishop of Seoul since April 2024.

== Biography ==
Bishop Lee was born on 1 November 1960 in Pil-dong, Jung-gu, Seoul, South Korea. He studied philosophy and theology in the major seminary of Seoul. He earned a licentiate and a doctorate in canon law at the Pontifical Lateran University in Rome.

He was ordained a priest on 12 February 1988. He was deputy parish priest of Sadang-dong in Seoul from 1988 to 1990 and then returned to Rome to study canon law from 1990 to 1995.

He returned to Seoul and served in the following positions: parish priest of Dongdaemun and of Banghak-dong from 1996 to 1999; executive secretary of the Faculty of Medicine of the Catholic University of Korea from 2001 to 2004; executive secretary of the Foundation for Catholic Education from 2004 to 2009; chaplain of the Catholic Medical Centre from 2009 to 2011; vice president of the Catholic Medical Centre from 2011 to 2013; secretary general of the Foundation for Catholic Education from 2013 to 2022; judicial vicar of the archdiocese of Seoul from 2018 to 2024; and parish priest of Saint Ignatius Kim of Gaepo-dong from 2022 to 2024.

He was appointed auxiliary bishop of Seoul and Titular Bishop of Germania in Numidia by Pope Francis on 24 February 2024.

He received his episcopal consecration on 11 April 2024 by Peter Chung Soon-taick at Myeongdong Cathedral.
