= Pedro López Quintana =

Spanish prelate of the Catholic Church (born 1953)

His Excellency, The Most Reverend Pedro López Quintana
- Apostolic Nuncio to Austria; Titular Archbishop of Acropolis
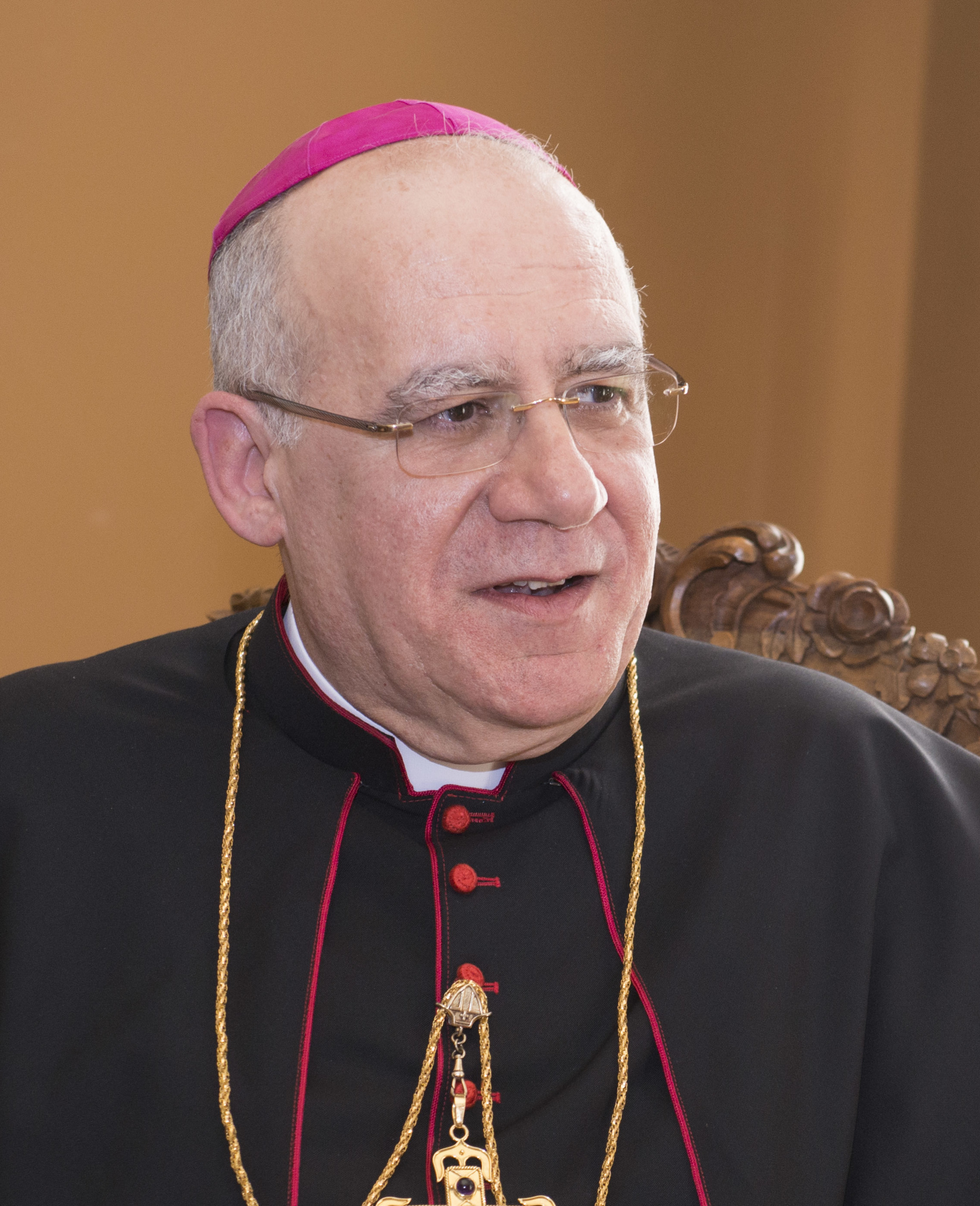
- Pedro López Quintana in 2014
- Appointed: 4 March 2019
- Predecessor: Peter Stephan Zurbriggen
- Other post: Titular Archbishop of Acropolis
- Previous posts: Apostolic Nuncio to Lithuania, Estonia and Latvia (2014-2019); Apostolic Nuncio to Canada (2009-2013); Apostolic Nuncio to India and Nepal (2003-2009)

Orders
- Ordination: 15 June 1980 by Pope John Paul II
- Consecration: 6 January 2003 by Pope John Paul II, Leonardo Sandri and Antonio Maria Vegliò

Personal details
- Born: 27 July 1953 (age 73) Barbastro, Spain
- Education: Pontifical University of Saint Thomas Aquinas; Pontifical Gregorian University; Pontifical Ecclesiastical Academy
- Motto: Caritas
- Styles
- Reference style: His Excellency; The Most Reverend
- Spoken style: Your Excellency
- Religious style: Archbishop

Pedro López Quintana (born 27 July 1953) is a Spanish prelate of the Catholic Church who has worked in the diplomatic service of the Holy See since 1984. Since becoming an archbishop in 2003, he has been the head of the papal offices in India, Nepal, Canada, Lithuania, Estonia and Latvia. He has been Apostolic Nuncio to Austria since March 2019.

== Biography ==
Pedro López Quintana was born on 27 July 1953 in Barbastro, Spain. His parents were from Galicia. He entered the seminary in Compostela where he did his ecclesiastical studies and graduated in theology. He was ordained a priest on 15 June 1980 by Pope John Paul II.

== Diplomatic career ==
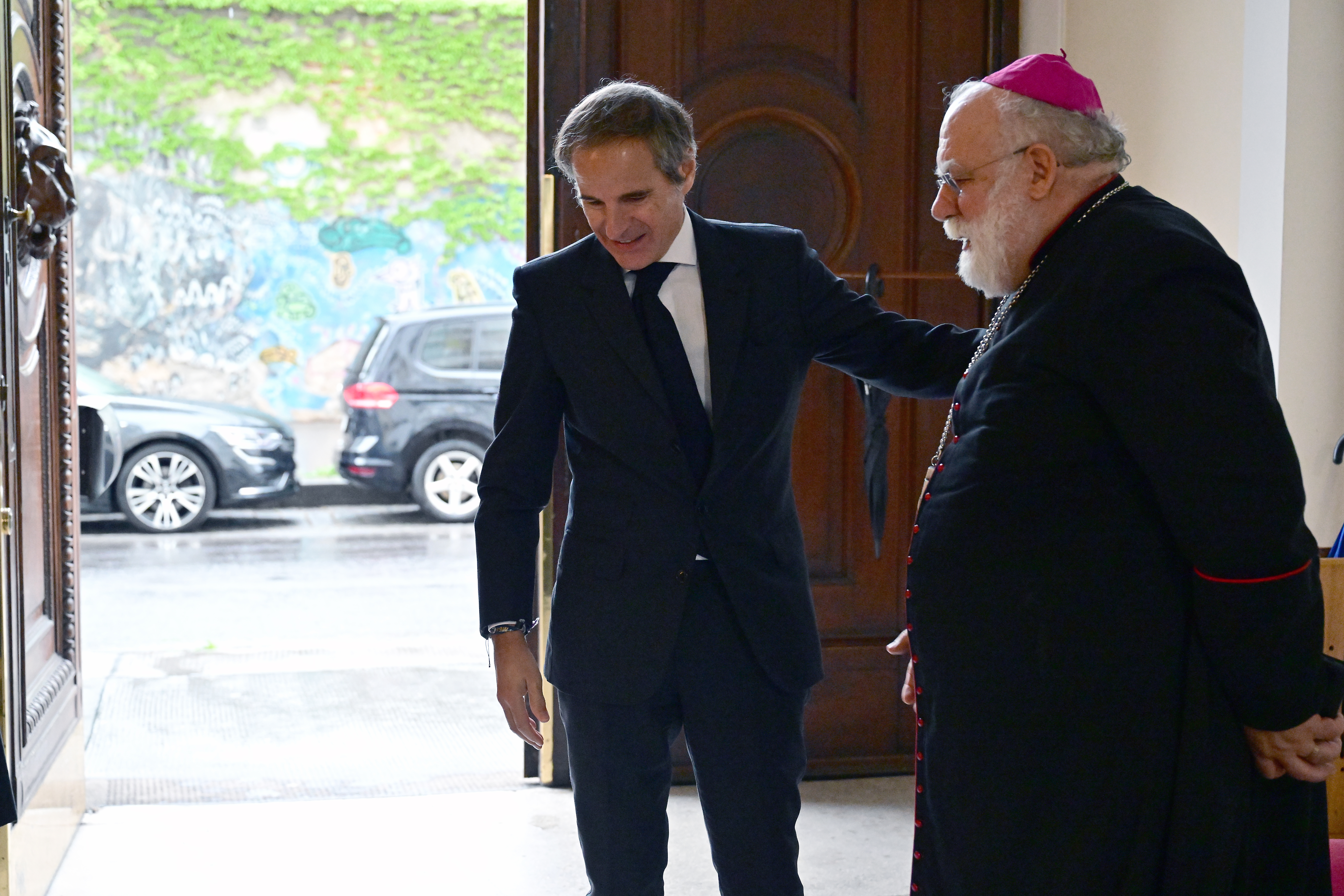
López Quintana (right) with Rafael Mariano Grossi as he signs the Book of Condolences for Pope Francis, 2025

To prepare for a diplomatic career he entered the Pontifical Ecclesiastical Academy in 1980 He earned a licentiate in Dogmatic Theology from the Pontifical Gregorian University and a doctorate in Canon Law from the Pontifical University of Saint Thomas Aquinas (the Angelicum). He joined the diplomatic service of the Holy See on 10 February 1984 and his early assignments included stints in Madagascar, the Philippines, and India. On 7 February 1998, he took up the post of Assessor for General Affairs in the Secretariat of State in Rome.

On 27 August 1986, Pope John Paul II appointed him a chaplain of His Holiness with the title monsignor.

On 12 December 2002, Pope John Paul II appointed him titular archbishop of Acropolis. He received his episcopal consecration on 6 January 2003 from Pope John Paul. On 8 February of that year, he was appointed Apostolic Nuncio to India and Nepal. On 10 December 2009, Pope Benedict XVI appointed him nuncio to Canada, a post he resigned on 28 September 2013.

On 8 March 2014, Pope Francis appointed him apostolic nuncio to Lithuania. On 22 March 2014, Pope Francis also appointed him Nuncio to Estonia and to Latvia. This continues the recent practice of having a single apostolic nuncio representing the Holy See in the Baltic states but residing at the nunciature in Vilnius.

On 4 March 2019, Francis named him Apostolic Nuncio to Austria.

== See also ==
- List of heads of the diplomatic missions of the Holy See

Diplomatic posts
Preceded by Lorenzo Baldisseri	Apostolic Nuncio to India; 8 Feb 2003 – 10 Dec 2009	Succeeded by Salvatore Pennacchio
