= Kamienna, Lower Silesian Voivodeship =

Kamienna
- Village
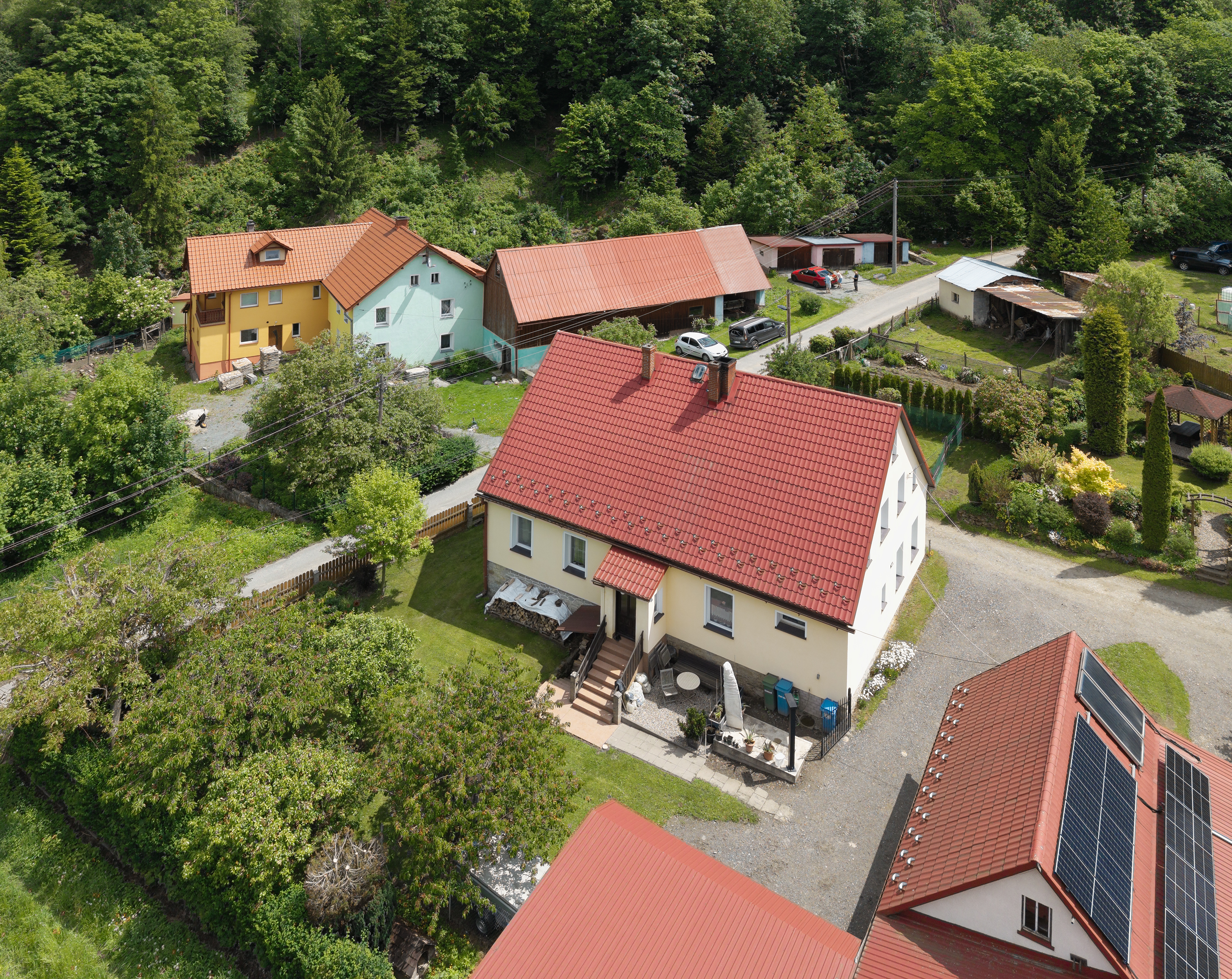

- Location within Poland
- Coordinates: 50°16′59″N 16°45′15″E
- Country: Poland
- Voivodeship: Lower Silesian
- County: Kłodzko
- Gmina: Bystrzyca Kłodzka
- Population: 90

Kamienna [kaˈmjɛnna] is a village in the administrative district of Gmina Bystrzyca Kłodzka, within Kłodzko County, Lower Silesian Voivodeship, in south-western Poland.
