= Luigi Bonazzi =

Italian prelate of the Catholic Church (1948–2025)

His Excellency, The Most Reverend Luigi Bonazzi
- Apostolic Nuncio Emeritus to Albania; Titular Archbishop of Atella
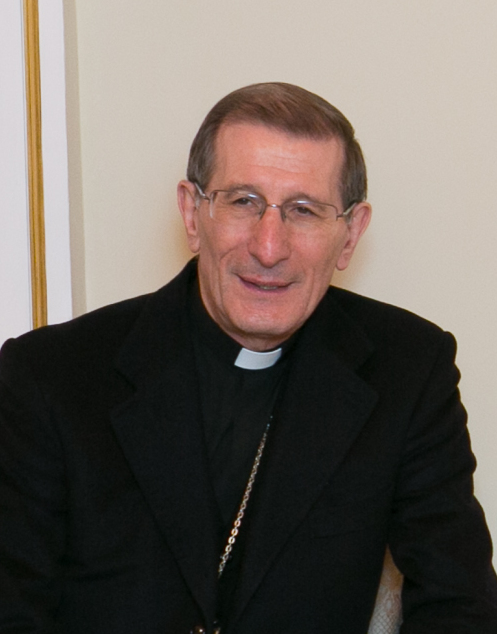
- Appointed: 10 December 2020
- Retired: 21 January 2025
- Predecessor: Charles John Brown
- Other post: Titular Archbishop of Atella (1999–2025)
- Previous posts: Apostolic Nuncio to Albania (2020–2025); Apostolic Nuncio to Canada (2013–2020); Apostolic Nuncio to Estonia, Latvia and Lithuania (2009–2013); Apostolic Nuncio to Cuba (2004–2009); Apostolic Nuncio to Haiti (1999–2004)

Orders
- Ordination: 30 June 1973 by Clemente Gaddi
- Consecration: 26 August 1999 by Angelo Sodano

Personal details
- Born: 19 June 1948 Gazzaniga, Italy
- Died: 3 December 2025 (aged 77)
- Denomination: Catholicism
- Education: Salesian Pontifical University; Pontifical Lateran University
- Motto: Credidimus caritati ('We have believed the love', 1 John 4:16)

Styles of Luigi Bonazzi
- Reference style: His Excellency; The Most Reverend
- Spoken style: Your Excellency
- Religious style: Archbishop

Luigi Bonazzi (19 June 1948 – 3 December 2025) was an Italian prelate of the Catholic Church who worked in the diplomatic service of the Holy See. He served as the apostolic nuncio to Canada from December 2013 to December 2020, and to Albania from 2020 to 2025.

== Biography ==
Luigi Bonazzi was born in Gazzaniga, Italy on 19 June 1948. He was ordained a priest on 30 June 1973. He held a Doctorate in educational sciences from the Salesian Pontifical University (Rome), and a Licence in Theology and in Canon Law from the Lateran Pontifical University (Rome).

== Diplomatic career ==
Bonazzi entered the diplomatic service of the Holy See on 25 March 1980. He served in the diplomatic missions of the Holy See in Cameroon (1980–83), Trinidad and Tobago (1983–86), Malta (1986–89), Mozambique, Spain (1991–94), the United States (1994–96), and Italy (1996–99).

On 19 June 1999, Pope John Paul II appointed him titular Archbishop of Atella and Apostolic Nuncio to Haiti. He was consecrated a bishop in Bergamo Cathedral on 26 August 1999 by Cardinal Angelo Sodano. John Paul named him Nuncio to Cuba on 30 March 2004.

On 14 March 2009, Pope Benedict XVI named Bonazzi Nuncio to Lithuania and Estonia. He was named Nuncio to Latvia as well on 25 March.

Pope Francis appointed him Nuncio to Canada on 18 December 2013. On 22 February 2019, a Canadian man, Christian Vachon, charged that Bonazzi's predecessor as nuncio, Luigi Ventura, had touched him improperly in July 2008, when he was 32. Vachon said Bonazzi called him the day he registered his complaint to discuss it.

On 10 December 2020, Pope Francis named him Apostolic Nuncio to Albania.

On 21 January 2025, Pope Francis accepted his resignation.

== Death ==
Bonazzi died on 3 December 2025, at the age of 77.

== See also ==
- List of heads of the diplomatic missions of the Holy See
