= Los Villares =

- city
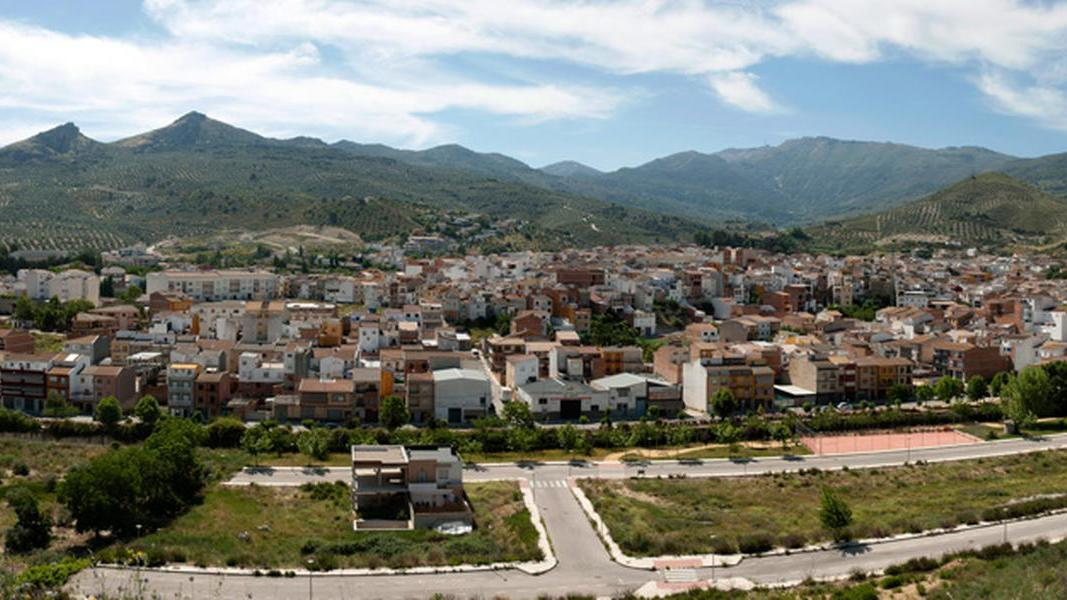

- Flag Coat of arms

- Location in the Province of Jaén Los Villares (Andalusia) Los Villares (Spain)
- Coordinates: 37°41′N 3°49′W
- Country: Spain
- Autonomous community: Andalusia
- Province: Jaén
- Municipality: Los Villares

Area
  - Total: 88 km^{2} (34 sq mi)
- Elevation: 541 m (1,775 ft)

Population (2025-01-01)
  - Total: 6,111
  - Density: 69/km^{2} (180/sq mi)
- Time zone: UTC+1 (CET)
  - Summer (DST): UTC+2 (CEST)

Los Villares is a city located in the province of Jaén, Spain. According to the 2005 census (INE), the city has a population of 5,289 inhabitants.
