= Riccardo Bartoloni =

Italian prelate

Riccardo Bartoloni (12 July 1885 – 11 October 1933) was an Italian prelate of the Catholic Church who served in the diplomatic service of the Holy See from 1918 to 1933.

== Biography ==
Riccardo Bartoloni was born on 12 July 1885 in Scarperia e San Piero in Florence, Italy. He earned degrees in theology, philosophy, and canon law, and he was ordained a priest on 12 August 1909. He was for a time the choir director at the Cathedral in Florence and championed the music of Lorenzo Perosi, not only there but while representing the Holy See abroad as a diplomat. He played a crucial role in launching the career of the Venezuelan composer Juan Bautista Plaza.

He worked in the nunciature in Venezuela from 1918 to 1922, and then from 1922 to 1928 in the offices of the Secretariat of State in Rome.

On 30 April 1928, Pope Pius XI named him titular archbishop of Laodicea in Syria and Apostolic Internuncio to Lithuania. He became the Nuncio on 9 November 1928. He received his episcopal consecration on 27 May 1928 from Cardinal Pietro Gasparri in the Basilica of San Lorenzo in Lucina. He supported the local clergy's struggle to protect the independence of the lay Catholic organization Catholic Action from government control. For this he was declared persona non grata and expelled from the country in the summer of 1931.

On 9 April 1933, Pope Pius appointed him Apostolic Delegate to Egypt, Arabia, Eritrea, and Ethiopia.

He died in Jerusalem on 11 October 1933 at the age of 48, following an operation for acute appendicitis.
