= Jean-Pierre Schumacher =

French trappist monk (1924–2021)

The Reverend Jean-Pierre Schumacher OCSO
- Born: 15 February 1924; Buding, Moselle, France
- Died: 21 November 2021 (aged 97); Priory of Our Lady of Atlas, Midelt, Morocco
- Occupation: Trappist monk

Jean-Pierre Schumacher, OCSO (15 February 1924 – 21 November 2021) was a French Trappist monk and prior who was one of the two survivors of the deadly terrorist attack on the Algerian Abbey of Our Lady of Atlas in 1996.

== Biography ==
Schumacher was born on 15 February 1924 in Buding, Moselle. He was born and raised in a Catholic family of six children. At the age of 18, he was enlisted in the Wehrmacht and escaped being sent to the Russian front thanks to a false diagnosis of tuberculosis during the military medical examination. Schumacher studied with the Marist Fathers and was ordained a priest in 1953. In 1957, he joined the trappists and entered the Abbey of the Notre-Dame de Timadeuc. At the request of the Archdiocese of Algiers, Schumacher was sent in 1964 to the Abbey of Our Lady of Atlas in Tibhirine, Algeria, alongside three other monks from Timadeuc.

On 21 May 1996, Schumacher survived the Tibhirine massacre alongside Amédée Noto. The monastery was transferred to Fez to a former annex of the monastery, where he was immediately appointed "superior ad nutum". On 18 September 1997, he became the successor to Christian de Chergé by election of this community, now called the Priory of Our Lady of Atlas. Four years later, in 2000, they settled permanently in Midelt in a monastery previously occupied by the Franciscan Missionary Sisters.

In December 2018, Schumacher and the rest of the community of Our Lady went to Algeria for the beatification of his former confreres and several other Christians killed during the Algerian Civil War. Thereafter, he returned to the Tibhirine monastery for a final time. In 2019, Schumacher met Pope Francis, who kissed his hands at a meeting while visiting Morocco.

Schumacher died on 21 November 2021 in Midelt, at the age of 97.

== In popular culture ==
Schumacher was portrayed by actor Loïc Pichon in the 2010 drama film Of Gods and Men.
