= DIMMID =

Benedictine interreligious dialogue movement

Dialogue Interreligieux Monastique - Monastic Interreligious Dialogue
- Abbreviation: DIM·MID
- Formation: 1977; 49 years ago
- Founded at: Loppem, Belgium (DIM), Petersham, Massachusetts (MID)
- Type: Benedictine International Organisation
- Leader: Cyprian Consiglio, OSBCam
- Main organ: Benedictine Confederation
- Parent organization: Catholic Church
- Website: dimmid.org

DIMMID, Dialogue Interreligieux Monastique - Monastic Interreligious Dialogue (DIM·MID), is a movement within the Benedictine and Cistercian order aimed to promote interfaith dialogue between monastic communities of different religions. Created in 1977, the movement approaches this aim through a mutual understanding and experience of each other's spirituality.

== History ==
=== Origin ===
The origins of DIMMID go back to post–World War II when communism was on the rise and many countries, especially in Africa, were becoming independent from their colonial powers, some of which had introduced and favoured Catholicism, which was now losing governmental support and competed with a reviving Islam. Pope Pius XII was concerned about the situation of the Church and therefore launched a general call to mission in 1957 in his encyclical Fidei Donum which led to the formation of AIM (Aid for the Implementation of Monasticism). The main force behind this imitative was the Dutch Benedictine Cornelius Tholens. Instead of focusing on evangelisation, he stressed the duty of monks and nuns to interact with people in any race or religion. This open approach predated the Second Vatican Council, which in its Pastoral Constitution Gaudium et spes in 1965 urged the Catholic community to acknowledge its solidarity with humankind and its history. In this early time, the AIM helped to sponsor conferences aimed to help monks and nuns in non-Christian countries to better understand the cultural and religious setting better. The conference in Bangkok in 1968 is particularly well-remembered due to accidental death of the Trappist monk Thomas Merton.

=== Foundation of DIMMID ===
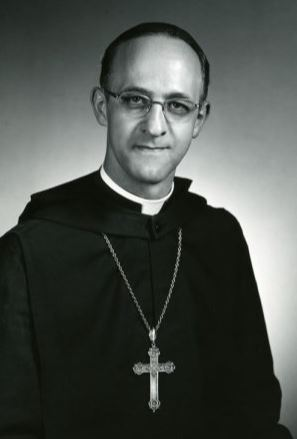
DIMMID was created under Rembert Weakland as part of a post–Vatican II interreligious experiment in dialogue with non-Christian religions.

The direction impetus for the foundation came through the letter of Cardinal Sergio Pignedoli, president of what has become the Dicastery for Interreligious Dialogue, to the Benedictine Abbot Primate Rembert Weakland in 1974. In this letter the cardinal asked the monastic orders to take up a leading role in interreligious dialogue as the presence of monasticism in various religions provided an important bridge for this dialogue. In 1977, two subcommission of the AIM were created. The North American Board for East-West Dialogue (NABEWD), which would later become the Monastic Interreligious Dialogue, was created in Petersham, Massachusetts in June 1977 and the Dialogue Interreligieux Monastique was founded in Loppem in Belgium in August that same year.

In 1979, the DIMMID helped to organise an "East-West Spiritual Exchange". Japanese Zen monks went to Europe to spend some time in Christian monasteries. Their experience of hospitality in a setting dedicated to spiritual life was fruitful and allowed for a deeper level of communion. The next "East-West Spiritual Exchange", in which 17 monks and abbots went to Japan upon invitation of Reverend Hirata Seiko, the president of the Institute for Zen studies, proved crucial. The participants recognised that in order for proper exchange and dialogue to occur, they had to enter their spirituality, make a serious attempt to understand it and appreciate their reasons for following the monastic way of life. The participants of the 1987 exchange were received at the end of their time by Pope John Paul II in Rome.

On proposal of Julian von Duerbeck, O.S.B., and Br. Wayne Teasdale the DIMMID hosted a dialogue session with the Dalai Lama on "Emptiness and Kenosis" at the Parliament of the World's Religions in 1993. This led to the creation of the so-called Gethsameni Encounters, encounters between Theravadin Buddhist monks and members of the DIMMID. The first of which took place at the Abbey of Our Lady of Gethsemani in July 1996 and was attended among others by the Dalai Lama and bishop Joseph John Gerry, O.S.B.

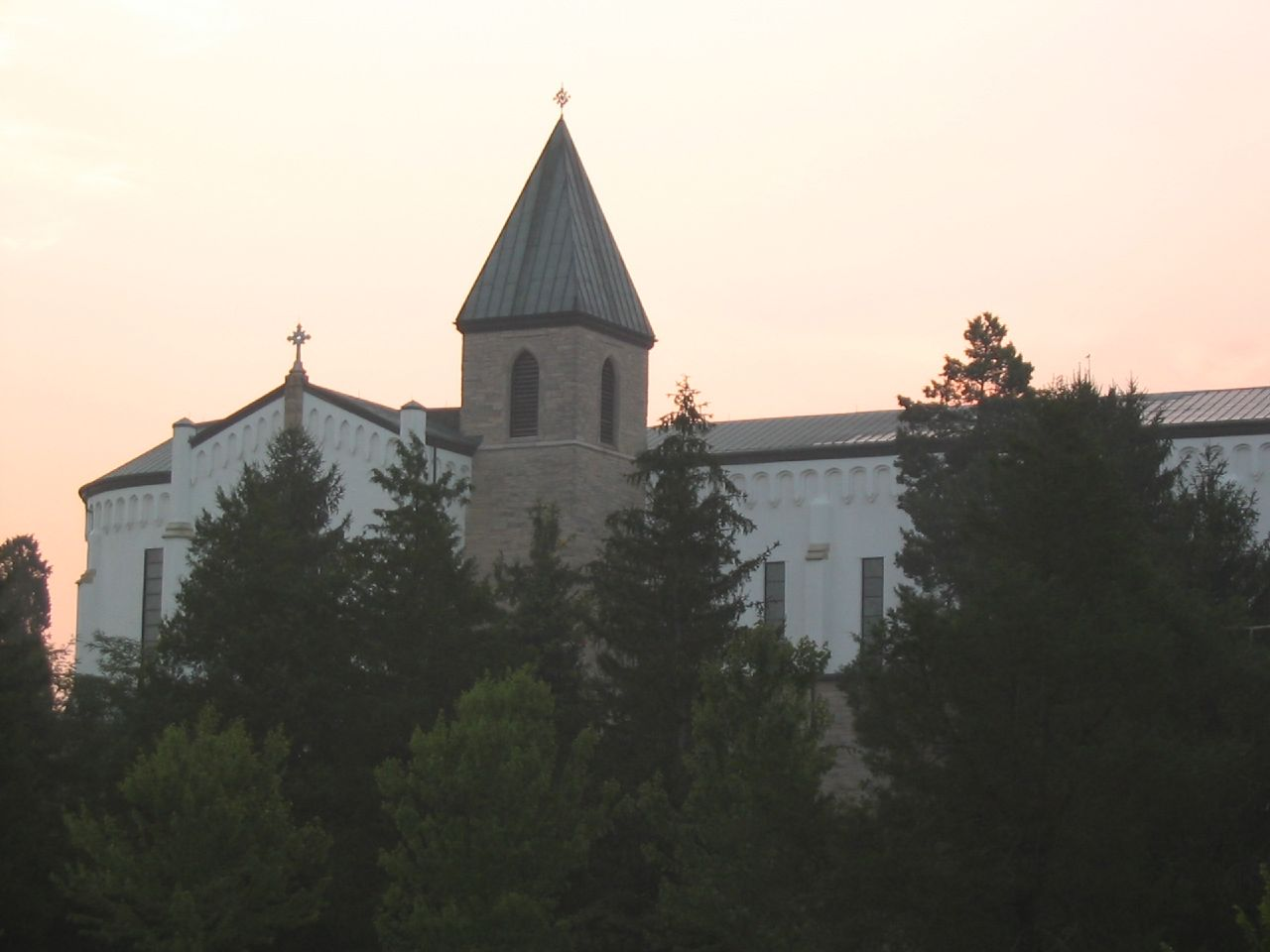
The Abbey of Our Lady of Gethsemani served as meeting space for the encounters between Buddhist and Christian monks in 1996 and 2002 organised by the DIMMID.

=== Independent Secretariat ===
Until 1994, the DMI was a subcommission of the AIM but as differences between their methods and objectives were becoming more evident, it was set up by Abbot Primate Jerome Theisen as an independent Secretariat, though always in liaison with the AIM. This secretariat would serve not only the Benedictine Confederation but also the two branches of the Cistercian order and to stress its international character, it was given both an English and French name.

Fr. Christian de Chergé, prior of the monastery Our Lady of Atlas, came to the annual meeting of the European DIM in Montserrat in 1995, the year before his murder. In his talk he explained the practice of communion in prayer, thus opening dialogue to other religions beyond Buddhism and Hinduism, such as those with non-monastic traditions such as Islam. In 2007, the European DIM met at the priory of Our Lady of Atlas in Morocco, the continuation of the Thibirine community.

In 2011, the first international monastic/Shia Muslim dialogue was organised by the DIMMID in Sant'Anselmo, attended among others by Iranian scholar Mohammad Ali Shomali. Since then, four further meetings took place in Qom/Isfahan (2012), Assisi/Rome (2014), Qom/Mashad (2016) and Karen, Nairobi (2017).

The "East-West Spiritual Exchanges" continue up to today and the DIMMID helps also to organise similar exchanges such as the First International Dialogue for Buddhist and Christian Nuns which took place in Kaohsiung, Taiwan, from 14-19 October 2018. 70 monastic women, half Buddhist and half Catholic, participated in the conference under the theme of "Active Contemplation and Contemplation in Action".

== Approach ==
While the origins of DIMMID lie in a missionary setting, the approach since the 1970s has been one of spiritual exchange. Whereas interreligious dialogue is often conducted within an academic setting, DIMMID approached this topic from an experiential side. William Skudlarek O.S.B., the Secretary general of DIMMID, characterises their approach to interreligious dialogue as emphasising the experiential knowledge of other spiritual paths and therefore "plunging" into another religious tradition in order to gain this experiential knowledge.

Though the DIMMID has been sometimes suspected of syncretism and a relativistic attitude by fellow Benedictines, it has been supported by Catholic authorities since its inception and promotes an ecclesiastic consciousness based on an approach to hospitality that is shaped by the Gospel command to love each other unconditionally.

== Media ==
In 2011, the DIMMID launched an online, multi-language journal called Dilatato corde (from Latin "expanded heart"). This bi-annual journal features contributions from spiritual practitioners and scholars of different religious traditions who wish to report, reflect on, and examine this form of interreligious dialogue.

A documentary movie about the DIMMID, Strangers No More, was filmed in 2015.

== Secretary General ==
- Pierre-François de Béthune, O.S.B. (1994-2007)
- William Skudlarek, O.S.B. (2007-2024)
- Cyprian Consiglio, OSBCam, (since 2024)

== Sources ==
- Blée, Fabrice (29 September 2020). "Chapter 43: Monastic Interreligious Dialogue". In Kaczynski, Bernice M. (ed.). The Oxford Handbook of Christian Monasticism. Oxford University Press. ISBN 978-0-19-100396-7.
- Blée, Fabrice (1 April 2011). The Third Desert: The Story of Monastic Interreligious Dialogue. Liturgical Press. pp. 50–51. ISBN 978-0-8146-3949-8.
- Borelli, John (2023). "In Memoriam: Bishop Joseph John Gerry, O.S.B. (1928-2023)". Dilatato Corde. XIII (2). DIMMID.
- de Béthune, Pierre-François (13 March 2013). "Monastic Inter-Religious Dialogue". In Cornille, Catherine (ed.). The Wiley-Blackwell Companion to Inter-Religious Dialogue. John Wiley & Sons. ISBN 978-1-118-52994-2.
- de Béthune, Pierre-François (2022). "Bethune Experience of Hospitality". Dilatato Corde. XII (2 July - December). DIMMID.
- Dojčár, Martin (1 January 2018). "An Interview with William Skudlarek: Interreligious Dialogue Emphasizes an Experiential Knowledge of Other Spiritual Paths". Spirituality Studies. 4 (2): 2–7. ISSN 1339-9578.
- Pope John Paul II (9 September 1987). "To the participants in the "East-West Spiritual Exchanges" (September 9, 1987) | John Paul II". www.vatican.va. Libreria Editrice Vaticana.
- Mitchell, Donald W.; Wiseman, James A., eds. (1997). The Gethsemani encounter - A dialogue on the spiritual life by Buddhist and Christian monastics. New York: The Continuum Publishing Company. ISBN 978-0-8264-1046-7.
- Moffitt, John (1970). A new charter for monasticism; by Meeting of the Monastic Superiors in the Far East, 1st, Bangkok, Thailand. London: Notre Dame, University of Notre Dame Press. pp. xiii–xv.
- McGee, OSB, Martin (17 August 2017). Dialogue of the Heart: Christian-Muslim Stories of Encounter. Orbis Books. ISBN 978-1-60833-704-0.
- Skudlarek, OSB, William (2017). "Report: Monastic Muslim Dialogue Kenya - DIMMID". Dilato Corde. 7 (2 - July - December). DIMMID.
- Skudlarek, OSB, William (8 December 2018a). "Monastic Interreligious Dialogue: Dialogue at the Level of Spiritual Practice and Experience". In Latinovic, Vladimir; Mannion, Gerard; Welle, O.F.M, Jason (eds.). Catholicism Engaging Other Faiths: Vatican II and its Impact. Springer. pp. 229–. ISBN 978-3-319-98584-8.
- Skudlarek, OSB, William (2018b). "The First International Dialogue for Buddhist and Christian Nuns". dimmid.org. VIII (2 July - December). DIMMID.
- Sutera, Judith (8 January 2019). "Buddhist, Christian nuns hold dialogue". Global Sisters Report. National Catholic Reporter Publishing Co.
- "DIMMID". dimmid.org. Dialogue Interreligieux Monastique / Monastic Interreligious Dialogue. p. en.
- "A Journal of the Dialogue of Religious Experience". dimmid.org. Dialogue Interreligieux Monastique / Monastic Interreligious Dialogue. p. en.
