= Maurice Borrmans =

French priest and missionary (1925–2017)

Father Maurice Borrmans M.Afr.
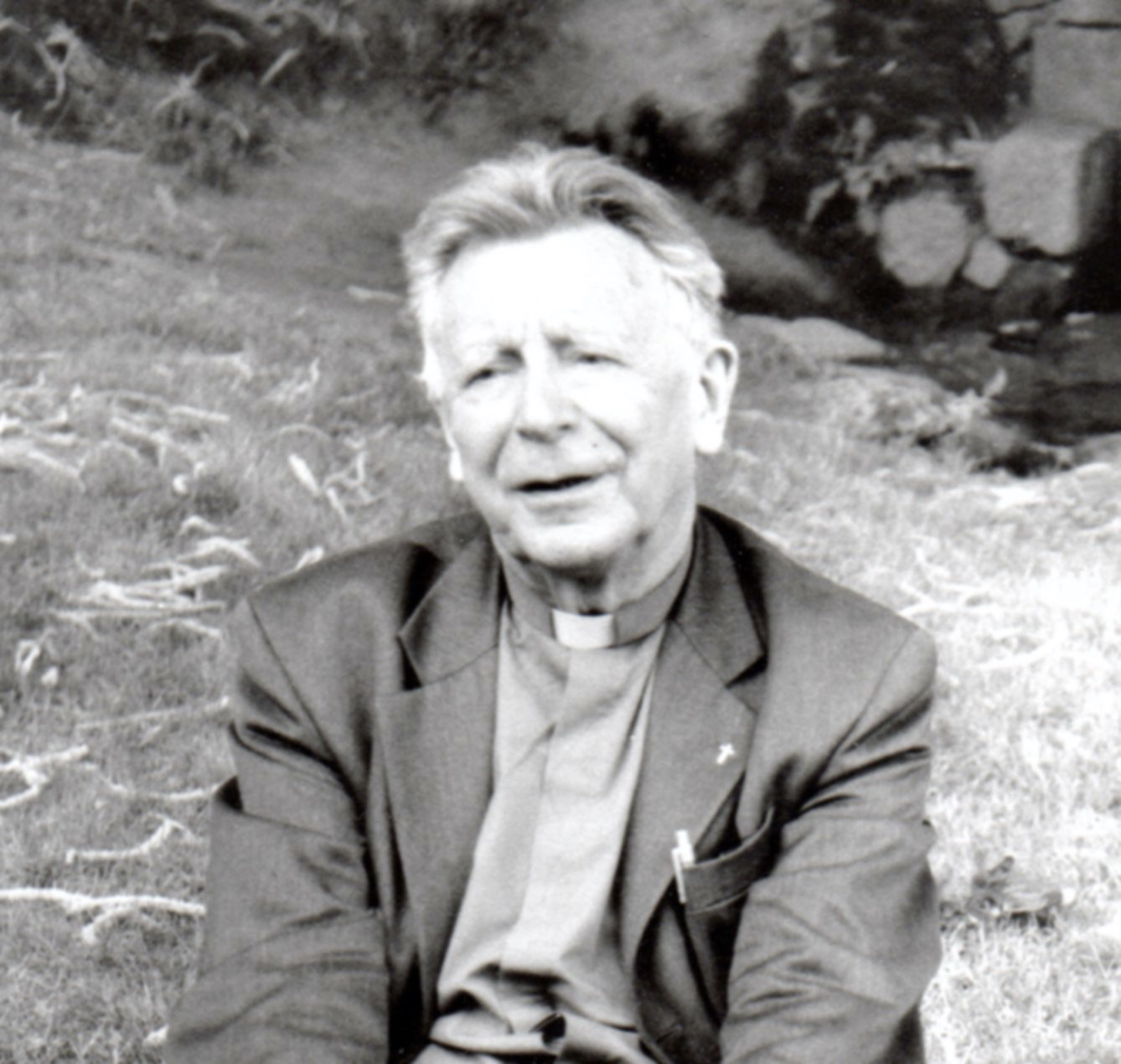

Orders
- Ordination: 1 February 1949

Personal details
- Born: October 22, 1925 Lille, Nord, France
- Died: December 26, 2017 (aged 92) Bry-sur-Marne, Paris, France

Maurice Borrmans M.Afr. (22 October 1925 — 26 December 2017) was a French Roman Catholic priest, Arabist, and missionary with the White Fathers who served in Algeria, Tunisia, Rome, Bahrain, Qatar, and the United Arab Emirates. He was a professor at the Pontifical Institute for Arabic and Islamic Studies from 1964 to 2004, where he founded and edited the journal Islamochristiana.

== Life ==
=== Early life ===
Maurice Borrmans was born in Lille, France on 22 October 1925. He received his secondary education in Dunkirk and Lille. The young Borrmans participated in scouting activities and was inspired to pursue a missionary vocation by the biography of Charles de Foucauld written by René Bazin. He entered seminary in Lille in 1942, the novitiate of the White Fathers in Algeria in 1945, professed his religious vows in Tunisia in 1945, and was ordained a priest there in 1949.

=== Academic formation ===
After his ordination in 1949, Borrmans studied Arabic in Manouba at the Institute of Arabic Literature, followed by three years of study from 1951 to 1954 University of Algiers in Arabic literature, psychology, philosophy, and Islamic studies. In 1954, he returned to IBLA as an Arabic professor. In 1964, IBLA transferred to Rome and was renamed the Pontifical Institute for Arabic and Islamic Studies. From 1966 to 1971, Borrmans pursued doctoral studies at the Sorbonne, specializing in family law in the Maghreb. He submitted two theses entitled Statut personnel et famille au Maghreb de 1940 à nos jours and Documents sur la famille au Maghreb de 1940 à nos jours avec les textes législatifs marocain, algérien, tunisien et égyptien en matière de statut personnel musulman.

=== Islamochristiana and interreligious dialogue ===
In 1975, Borrmans founded the journal Islamochristiana, an annual journal on Muslim-Christian dialogue. Notable authors published in Islamochristiana include Mohammed Arkoun, Jean-Marc Aveline, Miguel Ángel Ayuso Guixot, Kenneth Cragg, Christian de Chergé, Louis Gardet, Michael Fitzgerald, Pope John Paul II, Abdal Hakim Murad, Walter Kasper, Daniel Madigan, Gabriel Said Reynolds, Samir Khalil Samir, Mohamed Talbi, and Fouad Twal.

Borrmans served as a consultant to the Secretariat for Non-Christians, having been appointed in 1974. In 1981, he was sent to Bahrain, Qatar, and the United Arab Emirates to serve migrant workers. He returned to Rome after 1984 to continue his professorship. In addition, he organized and participated in interreligious dialogue initiatives, as well as participating in the preparations for the apostolic exhortation Ecclesia in Africa. During this period, he maintained now-published correspondence with Jacques Jomier and his former student Christian de Chergé, whose death deeply affected him.

=== Retirement and death ===
Borrmans retired from PISAI in 2004 to Lyon. He spent an active retirement writing books and editing correspondence of notable figures in Christian-Muslim dialogue, such as Louis Massignon, Paul Mulla, and Jean-Mohammed Abd-el-Jalil. In his retirement, he also further dedicated himself to participation in the Badaliya prayer movement. Borrmans died on 26 December 2017 of complications from a fall. His funeral was held in Bry-sur-Marne and celebrated by Jean-Marc Aveline, then Auxiliary Bishop of Marseille.

== Bibliography ==
- Codes de statut personnel et évolution sociale en certains pays musulmans, Ibla, 1963,
- Statut personnel et famille au Maghreb de 1940 à nos jours, 1977,
- Orientations pour un dialogue entre chrétiens et musulmans, Cerf, 1981,
- L'Islam, religion et société with Mohammed Arkoun and Mario Arosio, Cerf, 1982
- Jésus-Christ et les musulmans d'aujourd'hui, 1996, rééd. Desclée 2005,
- Dialogue islamo-chrétien à temps et contretemps, Saint-Paul, 2002, 253 p. ISBN 9782850498855, with Annie Laurent
- Jean-Mohammed Abd-el-Jalil, témoin du Coran et de l’Évangile, Cerf, Éditions franciscaines, 2004
- Prophètes du dialogue islamo-chrétien, Louis Massignon, Jean-Mohammed Abd-el-Jalil, Louis Gardet, Georges C. Anawati, Cerf, Collection L’histoire à vif, mars 2009
- Jean-Mohammed Abd-el-Jalil – Paul-Mehmet Mulla-Zadé, deux frères en conversion : du Coran à Jésus, Correspondance 1927-1957, Cerf, mars 2009
- Louis Gardet, philosophe chrétien des cultures et témoin du dialogue islamo-chrétien, 1904-1986, Cerf 2010
- Dialoguer avec les musulmans. Une cause perdue ou une cause à gagner ?, Pierre Téqui, 2011
- Lettres à un ami fraternel, Bayard, 2015
