= Priory of Our Lady of Atlas =

Trappist monastery in Midelt, Morocco

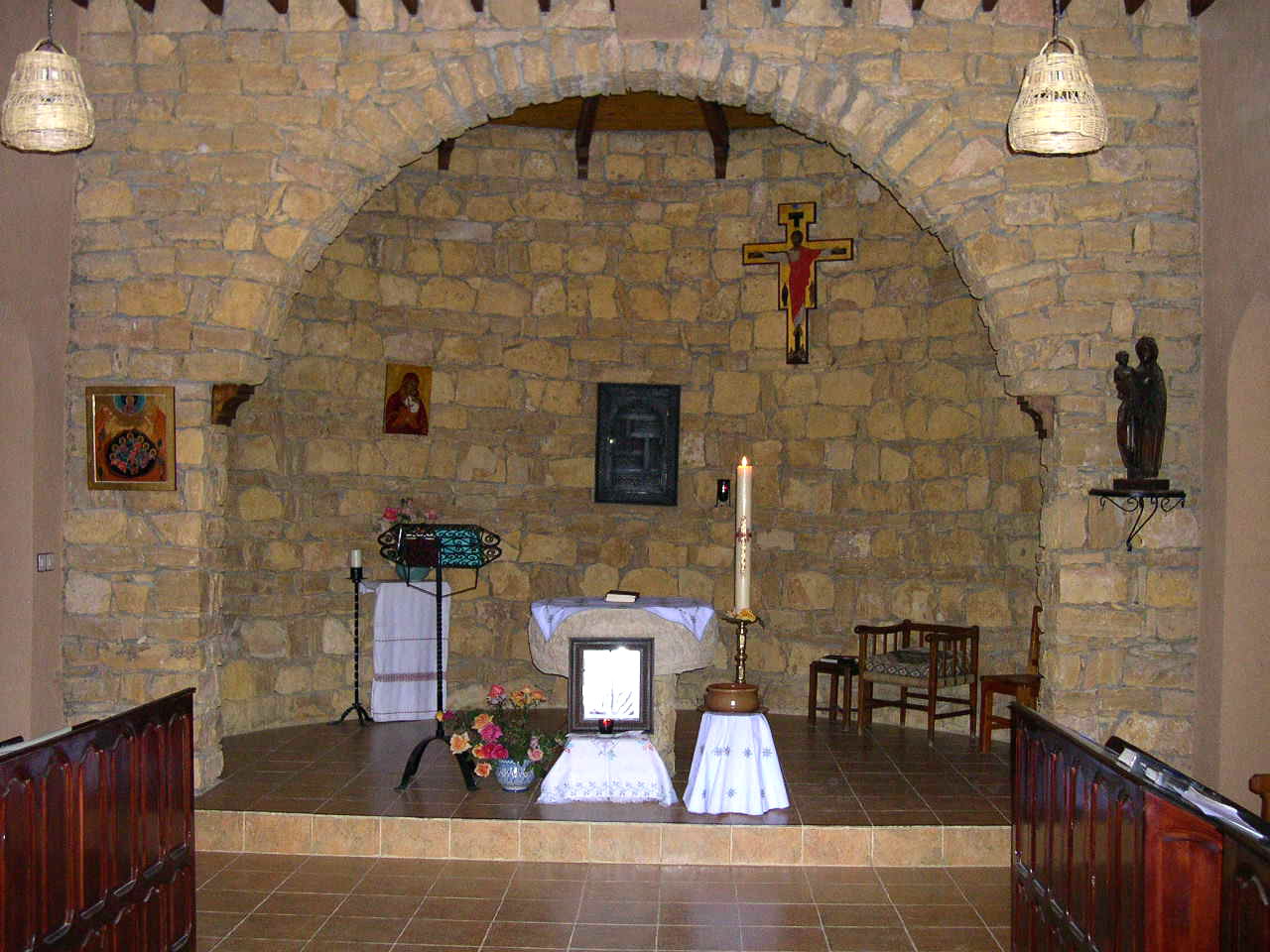
- Church of the priory
- Interactive map of Priory of Our Lady of Atlas

Monastery information
- Other name: Notre-Dame de l'Atlas
- Order: Trappists, OCSO
- Established: 1988
- Mother house: Aiguebelle Abbey
- Dedication: Saint Mary
- Diocese: Rabat

People
- Prior: Jean-Pierre Flachaire

Site
- Location: Midelt, Drâa-Tafilalet, Morocco; before 2000: Fez, Morocco
- Coordinates: 32°40′48″N 4°43′48″W
- Public access: Yes

The Priory of Our Lady of Atlas (French: Notre-Dame de l'Atlas) is a monastery of Trappist monks in Midelt, Morocco. It is a continuation of the community of the Abbey of Our Lady of Atlas after seven monks were killed there during the Algerian civil war.

== History ==
This community of Trappist monks was initially founded in Fez in 1988 on request of the bishop of Rabat, Hubert Michon, after he had been inspired by the Trappist Abbey of Our Lady of Atlas in Tibhirine, Algeria. They were given as home the former hotel "Bellevue Hotel" which had been built at the beginning of the 20th century and lay mostly in ruins. The community remained an annex to the Abbey in Algeria with four monks. After the killing of the monks of this abbey in 1996 and the joining of the two survivors, Fr. Amédée and Fr. Jean-Pierre, it was given the status of a priory. The murdered monks of the Abbey were later beatified together with twelve other martyrs in Algeria as the 19 martyrs of Algeria on 8 December 2018 in Oran and the priory keeps several of their relics and possessions, including an icon of the Virgin Mary.

In 1999, the community decided to change location from the old hotel to a small convent in the town of Midelt, two hundred kilometres south of Fez, on invitations of Franciscan missionary sisters of Mary. The community hosted the 2007 meeting of the Dialogue Interreligieux Monastique at its premises. The last survivor of the Tibhirine monks, Fr. Jean Pierre, died in 2021. The film-makers of the movie "Of Gods and Men" (which is based on the murder of the monks of the Abbey of Our Lady of Atlas) visited the monastery while filming the movie at the nearby abandoned monastery of Toumliline.

Whereas in 2006 there were only four monks, the community grew to seven in 2023 including the current prior, Dom Mikaël Ziolo, elected in 2026.

== Building ==
The convent in Midelt was constructed by the Franciscan Missionaries of Mary as the Kasbah Miryam des Soeurs in 1926. It includes a small church, two chapels (one dedicated to Charles de Foucauld and the other to Fr. Albert Peyriguère) and living spaces for the monks as well as for up to twenty guests. There is also an oratory dedicated to the Tibhirine martyrs and a cemetery of the Franciscan sisters, including the grave of sister Cécile Prouvost.

== List of priors ==
- Jean-Pierre Schumacher 1996–1999
- Dom Jean-Pierre Flachaire since 1999
