= Of Gods and Men (film) =

2010 film

- Theatrical release poster
- Directed by: Xavier Beauvois
- Written by: Étienne Comar; Xavier Beauvois
- Produced by: Pascal Caucheteux; Étienne Comar; Grégoire Sorlat
- Starring: Lambert Wilson; Michael Lonsdale
- Cinematography: Caroline Champetier
- Edited by: Marie-Julie Maille
- Production companies: Why Not Productions; Armada Films; France 3 Cinéma
- Distributed by: Mars Distribution (France)
- Release dates: 18 May 2010 (Cannes); 8 September 2010 (France)
- Running time: 122 minutes
- Country: France
- Languages: French; Arabic
- Box office: $42.1 million

Of Gods and Men is a 2010 French drama film directed by Xavier Beauvois, starring Lambert Wilson and Michael Lonsdale. Its original French language title is Des hommes et des dieux, which means "Of Men and of Gods" and refers to a verse from the Bible shown at the beginning of the film. It centers on a true story that happened in the monastery of Tibhirine, where nine Cistercian monks lived in harmony with the largely Muslim population of Algeria, until seven of them were kidnapped and murdered in 1996 during the Algerian Civil War.

Largely a tale of a peaceful situation between local Christians and Muslims before becoming a lethal one due to external forces, the screenplay focuses on the preceding chain of events in decay of government, expansion of terrorism, and the monks' confrontation with both the terrorists and the government authorities that led up to their deaths. Principal photography took place at an abandoned monastery in Azrou, Morocco.

The film premiered at the 2010 Cannes Film Festival where it won the Grand Prix, the festival's second most prestigious award. It became a critical and commercial success in its domestic market, and won both the Lumière and César Award for Best Film.

== Plot ==
The film opens with a quotation from the Book of Psalms: "I have said, Ye are gods; and all of you are children of the most High. But ye shall die like men, and fall like one of the princes." (Psalm 82:6–7) The monks' peaceful routine of prayer, medical assistance, and community interaction is soon interrupted by the threat of an Islamic fundamentalist group. When their elected leader, Christian, declines the protection of the corrupt civil authority, the monks divide amongst themselves on the question of whether to stay or flee Algeria. Before a decision is reached, a group of fundamentalists, led by Ali Fayattia, enters the monks' compound in force on Christmas Eve and demands their doctor and his medical supplies. Christian refuses their requests and cites the Quran as proof of the monks' goodwill. With a mixture of surprise and respect, Fayattia leaves the compound and grants it his protection until his capture, torture and death at the hands of government forces. Despite the growing danger, the monks come to consensus on the moral importance of maintaining their committed lives with, and ministry to, the local population, even when faced with violence and death. Ultimately, the terrorists seize most of the monks during a nighttime raid and hold them hostage. As the captive monks trudge a snowy path towards a grim fate, the film concludes with the spiritual testament of Prior Christian de Chergé, bravely written in the face of death.

== Cast ==
- Lambert Wilson as Christian
- Michael Lonsdale as Luc
- Olivier Rabourdin as Christophe
- Philippe Laudenbach as Célestin
- Jacques Herlin as Amédée
- Loïc Pichon as Jean-Pierre
- Xavier Maly as Michel
- Jean-Marie Frin as Paul
- Abdelhafid Metalsi as Nouredine
- Sabrina Ouazani as Rabbia
- Abdallah Moundy as Omar
- Olivier Perrier as Bruno
- Farid Larbi as Ali Fayattia
- Adel Bencherif as the terrorist

== Background and production ==
In 1996, seven French Trappist monks from the monastery of Tibhirine, Algeria, were kidnapped and found beheaded. The Armed Islamic Group of Algeria claimed full responsibility for the incident. However, according to documents from French secret services, it is possible that the killings were a mistake carried out by the Algerian army during a rescue attempt.

The film project was initiated by Etienne Comar in 2006, when the tenth anniversary of the incident made it a topic again in French media. Comar, a film producer by profession and a Catholic, had been fascinated by the monks since the earliest news of the abduction, but felt that their death had overshadowed what he thought was really interesting: why they had decided to stay in Algeria despite the ongoing Algerian Civil War. Comar contacted Xavier Beauvois in 2008 after having written a draft, and together they continued to work on the screenplay. The two researched, met with theologians, and during a break Beauvois chose to live for six days at the Tamié Abbey in Savoie. Some inspiration was taken from writings by two of the Tibhirine monks, Christian de Chergé and Christophe Lebreton. Franco-American monastic consultant Henry Quinson was asked to correct and add historical and liturgical content for further authenticity. The script was later sent to relatives of the deceased monks, most of whom reacted positively to the project.

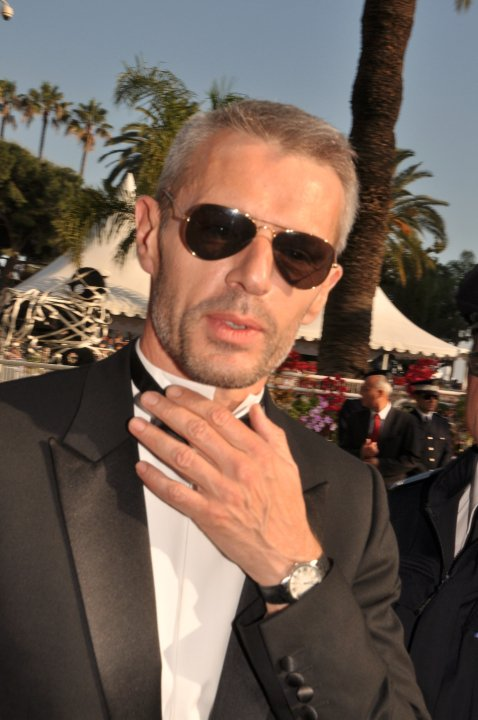
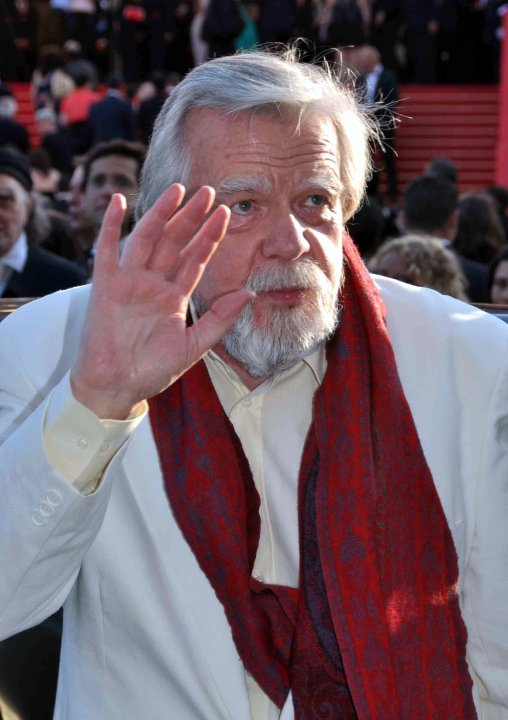
Actors Lambert Wilson and Michael Lonsdale at the 2010 Cannes Film Festival

The financing coincided with the revelation of the Algerian army's possible involvement in the incident, which once again sparked an interest for the story from media and the public. Production was led by Why Not Productions with Armada Films and France 3 as co-producers. Financial support was granted by the CNC. The budget was €4 million.

As preparation for their roles, French choir director François Polgar spent a month training the actors who were to play monks in the Cistercian and Gregorian chants. Each actor also spent a week living as a monk at the Tamié Abbey. The actors used different approaches to their individual roles. Lambert Wilson primarily used Christian de Chergé's writings to develop a subjective perception of the monk's personality. Xavier Maly, a non-Catholic, prepared himself by praying every day for a month. Jean-Marie Frin based his interpretation partially on a home video from Paul Favre-Miville's vow. Michael Lonsdale on the other hand preferred to rely on instinct, and did not prepare much at all.

Filming started in early December 2009 in Meknes, Morocco, and ended two months later. The main filming location was the Benedictine monastery of Toumliline, which had stood unused and unattended for more than 40 years. The film team, under production designer Michel Barthélémy, renovated the monastery so it would resemble the location of the actual events. The film makers also visited the Priory of Our Lady of the Atlas in Midelt where the two survivors of the Thiberine monks continued to live as Trappist monks. Quinson who had assisted with the screenplay was also present on the set as an advisor. Attention was paid to extras' clothing and Arabic intonation so that they would look and sound Algerian and not Moroccan.

== Release ==
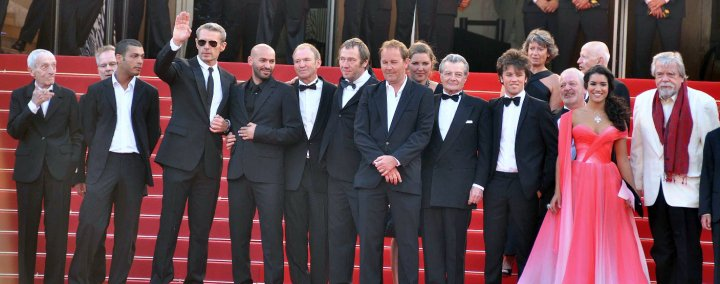
The film's cast and crew on the red carpet for the world premiere in Cannes

The film premiered on 18 May 2010 in competition at the 63rd Cannes Film Festival. It was the second time a film directed by Beauvois was selected for the festival; he had previously won the 1995 Jury Prize for Don't Forget You're Going to Die. Of Gods and Men was released in France on 8 September 2010 through Mars Distribution. It was launched on 252 screens, which after two weeks had been increased to 424, and further during the third week to 442. Artificial Eye released it in the United Kingdom on 3 December 2010. Sony Pictures Classics acquired the distribution rights for the United States, Australia and New Zealand.

== Reception ==
=== Critical response ===
As of September 2024, the film holds a 92% approval rating on review aggregation website Rotten Tomatoes, based on 118 reviews with an average rating of 8.3 out of 10. The site's consensus reads, "Patient and restrained, Of Gods and Men asks deep, profound questions that will linger in the audience's mind long after the movie." Metacritic gave the film a weighted score of 86/100, based on 29 reviews, which it ranks as "universal acclaim".

Le Monde's Isabelle Regnier wrote: "We can, we must, even, consider this film as a profession of faith. But it is in the cinema where Beauvois always has placed his own, and where he places it here more than ever. Confident in the talent of his cinematographer, Caroline Champetier, ... he signs a powerful and stripped mise en scène[.] ... Relying on the arid majesty of the Atlas' landscapes (Moroccan for the filming), the milky purity of monks' robes, the rhythm of the ritual, Xavier Beauvois plays with the tracking shots with a breathtaking mastery". Didier Péron of the left-wing newspaper Libération was positive overall, but remarked: "Of Gods and Men would no doubt have lost in grandeur and lyricism ... what it would have gained in political content if it had specifically questioned the place of the monks and the profound role of their unctuous paternalism versus a failing state and among a deprived population."

In the United Kingdom, Tom Dawson of Total Film gave the film four stars out of five, and Tim Robey rated it three out of five in The Daily Telegraph. Both critics praised the performances of Wilson and Lonsdale. Dawson called the film a "masterful drama", and Robey wrote: "It's a grave and thoughtful film, and certainly not a bad one, for all my twinges of scepticism about how deep its insights really go." Robey's main complaint concerned the ending of the film: "There's one serious mistake, in a picture that's almost passive-aggressively careful in most of its scenes: a last supper, while the monks sip wine, look at each other in silent, welling close-ups, and Tchaikovsky's Swan Lake overture crescendoes over the top. Those last three words are operative – Beauvois could hardly milk this emotional catharsis more coercively if he came down the aisles handing out tissues." Dawson on the other hand approved of the scene's manner: "The Last Supper-style sequence, where the monks listen to Swan Lake and share red wine, is particularly affecting." Radio critic Mark Kermode gave an extremely positive review of the film, later ranking it as the 2nd best film of 2010.

=== Box office ===
362,671 tickets were sold during the first five days of the French theatrical run. This can be compared to the director's last film, The Young Lieutenant, which had 197,783 admissions after the same number of days in 2005. Of Gods and Men went on to top the French box office for four consecutive weeks. After the fifth week it dropped to number three, having been overtaken by Despicable Me and You Will Meet a Tall Dark Stranger, which both premiered that week. It had received 3,202,645 admissions in France.

In United Kingdom, Of Gods and Men was distributed, the first week, in only 16 movie houses. It was part, from the first weekend, of the 15 best at the box office. In United States, the film was distributed, 25 February, in only 33 theaters. It is part, from the first week, of the 25 best at the box office.

=== Accolades ===
The Cannes Film Festival jury, led by American director Tim Burton, honoured the film with the Grand Prix. Of Gods and Men also received the Prize of the Ecumenical Jury. In France, it won the César Awards 2011 for Best Film, Lonsdale as Best Supporting Actor and Best Cinematography. In total it was nominated in eleven categories, which was more than any other film that year. The other nominations were for Wilson as Best Actor, Olivier Rabourdin as Best Supporting Actor, Best Director, Best Original Screenplay, Best Sound, Best Editing, Best Costume Design and Best Production Design. It won the 16th Lumière Award for Best Film and Lonsdale received the Best Actor prize. It was also nominated for Best Director and Wilson as Best Actor.

At the 23rd European Film Awards, the film was nominated for Best Film and Best Cinematography. It received the 2010 National Board of Review Award for Best Foreign Language Film. The British Academy of Film and Television Arts nominated it for Best Film Not in the English Language at the 64th BAFTA Awards. It was selected as France's submission for the Academy Award for Best Foreign Language Film at the 83rd Academy Awards, but it did not make the final shortlist.

== See also ==
- Religion in Algeria
- The Garden of Allah (1936 film)
- List of submissions to the 83rd Academy Awards for Best Foreign Language Film
- List of French submissions for the Academy Award for Best Foreign Language Film
