= Christophe Lebreton =

French Trappist monk

Christophe Lebreton OCSO (October 11, 1950 – May 21, 1996) was a French Trappist monk. He was one of seven Trappist monks from the Our Lady of the Atlas Abbey of Tibhirine near Médéa, Algeria who were kidnapped and killed during the Algerian Civil War. He was recognized as a martyr by Pope Francis in January 2018, and proclaimed Blessed on December 8, 2018 in Oran, Algeria, along with the other martyrs of Algeria. His writings, published after his death, reveal his poetry and spiritual depth. The murder of the monks of Tibhirine gained widespread attention in the prize-winning film Of Gods and Men.

== Early life ==
Christophe Lebreton was born in Blois, France in 1950, and grew up in a family of twelve children and performed his national service in Algeria in 1970 by teaching students and working with handicapped children. Father Carmona, a priest friend, brought him to Tibhirine on several occasions. The extreme poverty of the neighboring people made an indelible impression. Lebreton said that he was sure that he would return.

== Life as a monk ==
In 1974, he abandoned his legal studies in Tours to enter the Trappist Tamié Abbey, Savoy, and made his religious profession in 1980. After a period of monastic formation, desiring a simpler life and responding to a call for reinforcement, he changed his stability to the Algerian monastery of Our Lady of the Atlas. He was ordained priest by Bishop Henri Teissier in 1993. In the monastery his work responsibilities included liturgy, farming, vineyards, and gardening. He was also subprior of the monastery as well as novice master.

Lebreton kept a diary, especially from 1993 until his death. His writings show the density of his poetry, his open and reflective exchanges with his Algerian neighbors, and his spiritual depth. His journal was translated by Mette Louise Nygård and Edith Scholl and published under the title Born from the Gaze of God.

== Death ==
Father Christophe Lebreton was abducted in the night of March 27, 1996 along with six of his fellow monks when twenty armed members of the Armed Islamic Group (GIA) arrived at the monastery of Tibhirine and kidnapped the monks. Two other monks, Father Jean-Pierre and Father Amédée, were in separate rooms and escaped. After the kidnappers left, the remaining monks tried to contact the police, but the phone lines were cut due to a curfew. They had to wait until morning to drive to the police station in Médéa to report the attack and kidnapping.

After the kidnapping, the GIA announced that they would release the monks in exchange for Abdelhak Layada, a former GIA leader who had been arrested three years earlier. The demands were not met and on May 23, 1996, the GIA announced that they had executed the monks.

== Beatification ==
Pope Francis beatified the seven monks, including Lebreton, along with 12 others as martyrs of Algeria on December 8, 2018. The celebration occurred in Oran, Algeria.
