= Odette Prévost =

French Roman Catholic nun

Martyr
- Born: 17 July 1932; Oger, Marne, France
- Died: 10 November 1995; Algiers, Algeria
- Beatified: 8 December 2018

Odette Prévost (17 July 1932 – 10 November 1995) was a French Roman Catholic nun, who was working as a teacher and a librarian when she was killed in Algiers en route to Mass. She is recognized as a martyr and was proclaimed blessed on 8 December 2018.

== Biography ==
Odette Prévost was born in Champagne in Oger in the Marne department of France on 17 July 1932.

She became a teacher and taught English for three years, at Avize. She asked herself the question of the religious vocation, and thought first of all about Cistercian life, but then decided to follow the footsteps of Charles de Foucauld. She joined the Little Sisters of the Sacred Heart at age 21, in 1953.

For her first mission, Prévost was sent in 1958 to Morocco, to Kbab, among the Berbers. She served at the clinic, and gave girls knitting and sewing classes. She thus met the Muslims and their culture. Prévost made perpetual profession in 1959. She also met for a year Father Peyriguère, the famous French hermit who lived alone nearby in the Moroccan Atlas, imitating Father de Foucauld.

Recalled to France, where she worked among the Argenteuil laborious and disadvantaged population, she wanted to move back to Algiers, where she arrived in 1968, in the district of Kouba. She participated in the founding of a community of Sisters, and lived in the same destitution as the local population. Desiring to better master language and culture, she moved to Rome in 1980 to study classical Arabic and Islamic sciences for two years. Returning to Algiers, she joined the Diocesan Cultural Center "Glycines", where she was alternately librarian and teacher of Arabic. She was also part of Ribat-el-Salam (Link of Peace) where she met the monks of Tibhirine.

According to the Prioress General of her order, she was tall and intellectually gifted, but did not possess an easy temperament. She criticized the authorities and was rather often worried; but a few months before her death she had manifestly transformed herself, as another future martyr, the bishop of Oran, Pierre Claverie, noticed : "because when you risk your own life, you have to go to the essential. "

On 10 November 1995, at around 8:30 am, she went with another sister to attend mass when an Islamist terrorist came out of a car and shot her at point blank range. Prévost died instantly, her friend was seriously injured in the jaw.

She was recognized a martyr in January 2018 by Pope Francis, then proclaimed blessed during the beatification ceremony on 8 December 2018 in Algeria, in Oran, with the group of martyrs of Algeria. It was the first beatification ceremony in a country with a Muslim majority.

== Quote ==
Prayer composed by Prévost, found on her just after her death:

"Live today’s day. God gives it to you, it belongs to you. Live it in God. Tomorrow’s day belongs to God, it doesn’t belong to you. Do not impose today’s worry upon tomorrow. Tomorrow belongs to God, hand it over to him. The present moment is a frail footbridge. If you weigh it down with yesterday’s regrets, Tomorrow’s anxiety, The footbridge gives way and you lose your footing. The past? God forgives it. The future? God gives it. Live today’s day in communion with God.

== Bibliography ==
- (in French) Thomas Georgeon & Christophe Henning, Nos vies sont déjà données, Bayard, 2018.
