= Oued Harbil =

Oued Harbil وادي حربيل
- Commune and town
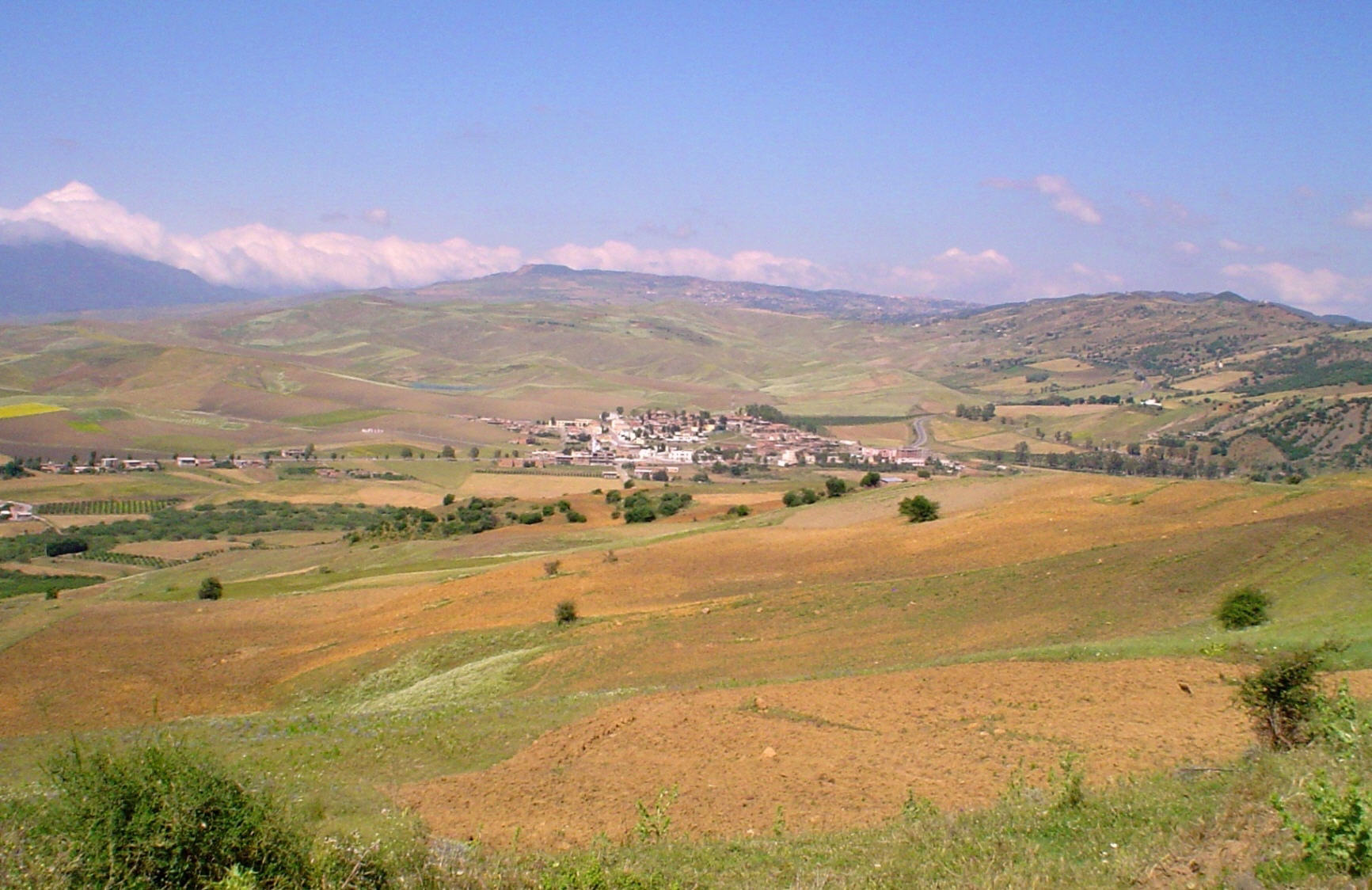

- Location within Algeria
- Coordinates: 36°14′0″N 2°38′0″E
- Country: Algeria
- Province: Médéa Province
- District: Ouamri District

Area
  - Total: 24 sq mi (62 km^{2})

Population (1998)
  - Total: 4,768
- Time zone: UTC+1 (CET)

Oued Harbil is a town and commune in Médéa Province, Algeria. According to the 1998 census, it has a population of 4,768.

== About ==
Oued Harbil is in Medea, Algeria and is home to the Royal Mausoleum of Mauretania, the Monastere de Tibhirine, and the Tombeau of the Chretienne.
