= Pontifical Institute for Arabic and Islamic Studies =

Higher education institution in Rome

Coordinates: 41°53′13″N 12°28′22″E

The Pontifical Institute for Arabic and Islamic Studies (Italian: Pontificio Istituto di Studi Arabi e d'Islamistica, Latin: Pontificium Institutum Studiorum Arabicorum et Islamicorum; PISAI) is a Catholic institution of higher education located in Rome focused on Arabic and Islamic culture, history and language. As of 2006, there have been over 1,300 students at the Institute since its beginning.

== History ==
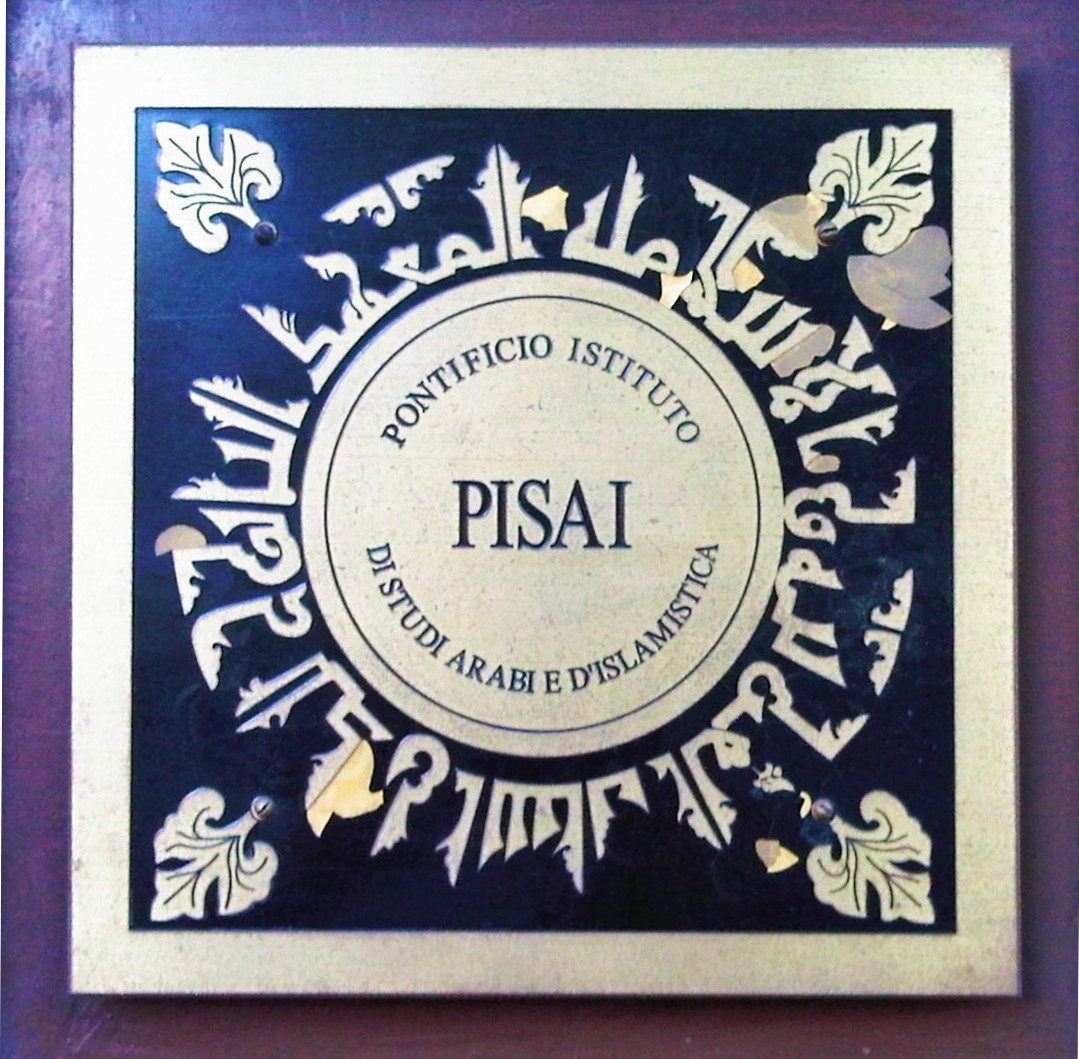
Entry plaque to the PISAI

The institute traces its foundation back to 1926 and the work of the Missionaries of Africa (White Fathers) in Tunisia in a training centre for missionaries preparing to work in Muslim countries. In 1931 this foundation took the name Institute of Arabic Literature (French: Institut de Belles Lettres Arabes; IBLA). Important for that process were Fr. Henri Marchal and André Demeerseman for whom Christian-Muslim encounter upon sound knowledge was of utmost importance.

In 1949 it was decided to separate the teaching section from the other activities undertaken at IBLA which were more linked to the specifically Tunisian cultural scene. So a study centre was opened at Manouba (near Tunis) which welcomed students of Arabic language and Islamic sciences. Later, in accordance with a Decree of the Sacred Congregation for Seminaries and Universities dated 19 March 1960, this training institute was raised to the Pontifical Institute for Oriental Studies. In 1964, the Institute was transferred to Rome and its name changed to the Pontifical Institute for Arabic Studies thus avoiding any confusion with the already existing Pontifical Oriental Institute. In 1967, at the wish of Pope Paul VI, the Institute was situated in part of the Palazzo di S. Apollinare. The sole teaching language, other than Arabic, was French. In 1972 an English-speaking section was added as was later an Italian.

Since 1966, the Institute has had the faculty to award the Licentiate in Arabic and Islamic Studies at the end of a two-year course of study and preceded by a preparatory year. In accordance with Decree No. 292/80/5 of 25 May 1980, the Congregation for Catholic Education granted the Institute the authority to award the Doctorate. The name currently held by the Institute is the Pontifical Institute for Arabic and Islamic Studies (PISAI). Its new Statutes were approved by the Congregation for Catholic Education in Decree No. 826/79 on 13 September 2008.

== Notable alumni ==
Christian de Chergé, one of the 19 martyrs of Algeria and prior of the abbey of Our Lady of Atlas, studied Arabic language and culture at the Institute from 1972 to 1974. Other alumni include Christophorus Tri Harsono, Dominic Eibu and Sister Carmen Sammut.
