= Buding =

- Commune
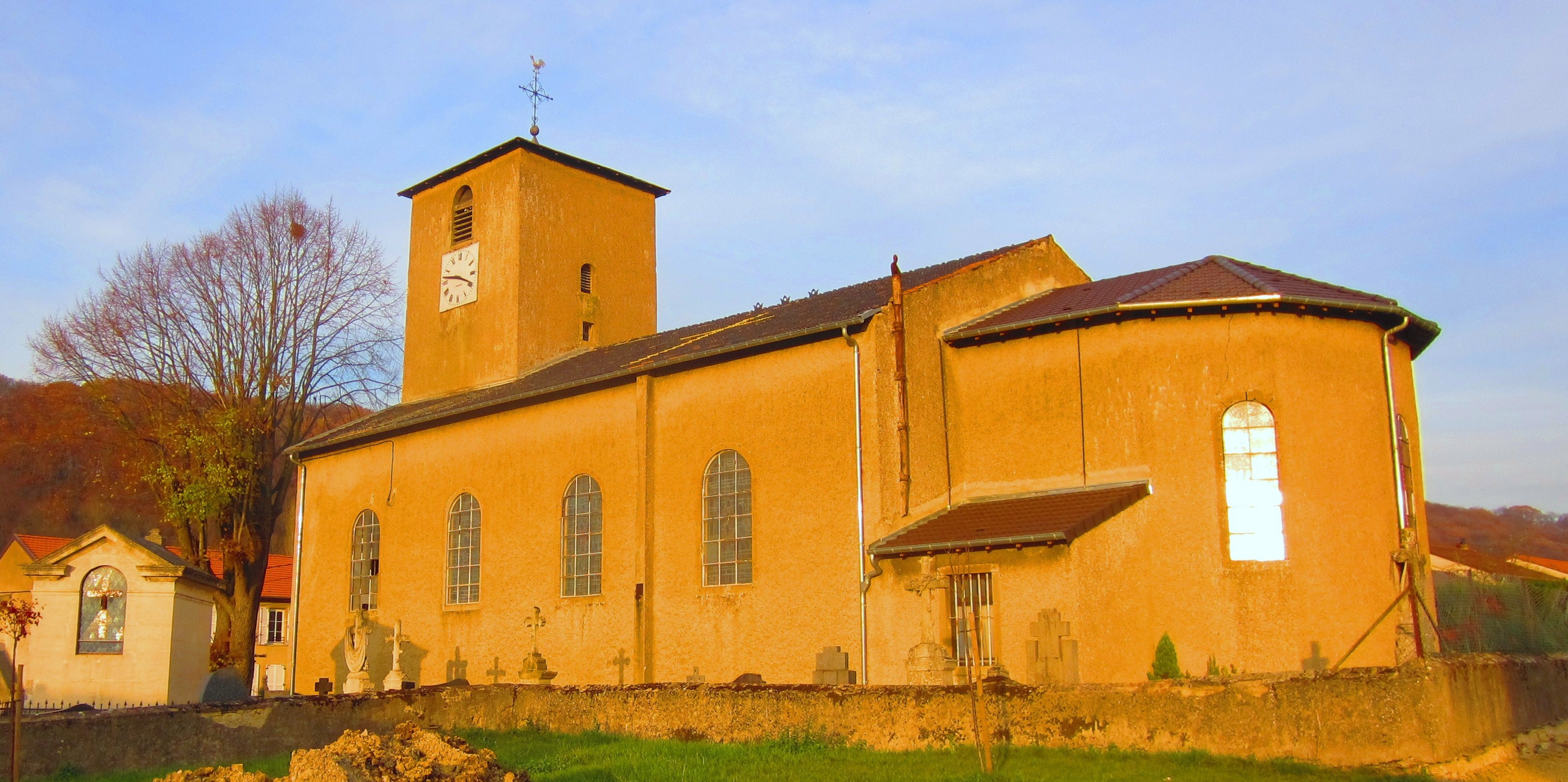
- The church in Buding

- Coat of arms
- Location of Buding
- Location within France Location within Grand Est
- Coordinates: 49°20′02″N 6°19′19″E
- Country: France
- Region: Grand Est
- Department: Moselle
- Arrondissement: Thionville
- Canton: Metzervisse
- Intercommunality: Arc mosellan

Government
  - Mayor (2020–2026): Philippe Schiano
- Area^{1}: 6.36 km^{2} (2.46 sq mi)
- Elevation: 2,500 m (8,200 ft)
- Highest elevation: 3,006 m (9,862 ft)
- Lowest elevation: 1,700 m (5,600 ft)
- Population (2023): 562
  - Density: 88.4/km^{2} (229/sq mi)
- Time zone: UTC+01:00 (CET)
  - Summer (DST): UTC+02:00 (CEST)
- INSEE/Postal code: 57117 /57920
- ^{1} French Land Register data, which excludes lakes, ponds, glaciers > 1 km^{2} (0.386 sq mi or 247 acres) and river estuaries.

Buding (French pronunciation: [bydɛ̃]; Lorraine Franconian: Bëddéngen; German: Büdingen) is a commune in the Moselle department in Grand Est in northeastern France.

The locality of Elzing (German: Elzingen) is incorporated in the commune.

== Population ==
Historical population
Year	Pop.	±% p.a.
1968	339	—
1975	339	+0.00%
1982	385	+1.83%
1990	509	+3.55%
1999	472	−0.84%
2007	494	+0.57%
2012	600	+3.96%
2017	588	−0.40%
2023	562	−0.75%
Source: INSEE

== Notable people ==
- Jean-Pierre Schumacher, Trappist monk and survivor of the Tibhirine monks

== See also ==
- Communes of the Moselle department
