= Ahouli =

- Abanonded mining village
- Interactive map of Ahouli
- Coordinates: 32.8386°N 4.5756°W
- Country: Morocco
- Region: Drâa-Tafilalet
- Province: Midelt Province
- Time zone: UTC+0 (GMT)

Ahouli (or Aouli) is an abandoned mining village in central Morocco. Once one of the most important lead deposits in Morocco, the nearby Ahouli and Mibladen mines are now abandoned. It is located on a valley along upper Moulouya river, about 25 kilometers north from Midelt. For more than ten years, thousands of illegal miners risked their lives in its galleries daily.

The French company Penarroya operated the sites from 1928 to the 1960s, employing hundreds of Moroccan workers and producing tens of thousands of tons of lead annually, most of which was exported to France.
