= Murder of the monks of Tibhirine =

Algerian Civil War massacre

Coordinates: 36°17′44″N 2°42′56″E

Martyrs of Atlas
- Died: 21 May 1996, Tibhirine, Algeria
- Martyred by: Armed Islamic Group or regular Algerian Army
- Venerated in: Catholic Church
- Beatified: 8 December 2018, Notre Dame de Santa Cruz, Oran, Algeria
- Notable martyrs: Christian de Chergé, Brother Luc (born Paul Dochier), Father Christophe (Lebreton), Brother Michel (Fleury), Father Bruno (born Christian Lemarchand), Father Célestin (Ringeard), and Brother Paul (Favre-Miville)

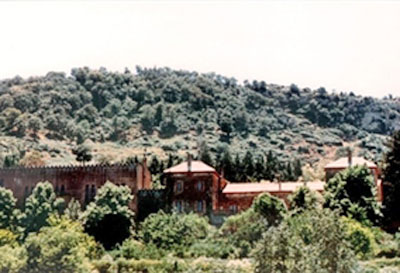
Tibhirine Monastery

On the night of 26–27 March 1996, seven monks of the Trappist order from the Our Lady of the Atlas Abbey of Tibhirine near Médéa, Algeria, were kidnapped during the Algerian Civil War. They were held for two months, and found dead in late May 1996. The circumstances of their kidnapping and death remain controversial; the Armed Islamic Group (Groupe Islamique Armé, GIA) claimed responsibility for both, but in 2009, retired General François Buchwalter reported that the monks were killed by the Algerian army.

== Circumstances ==
At approximately 1:15 a.m. on 27 March 1996, about twenty armed members of the Armed Islamic Group (GIA) arrived at the monastery of Tibhirine and kidnapped seven monks. Two others, Father Jean-Pierre and Father Amédée, were in separate rooms and escaped the kidnappers' notice. After the kidnappers left, the remaining monks attempted to contact the police, but found that the telephone lines had been cut. As there was a curfew in force, they had to wait until morning to drive to the police station in Médéa.

On 18 April, the GIA's communiqué no. 43 announced that they would release the monks in exchange for Abdelhak Layada, a former GIA leader who had been arrested three years earlier. On 30 April, a tape with the voices of the kidnapped monks, recorded on 20 April, was delivered to the French Embassy in Algiers. On 23 May, the GIA's communiqué no. 44 reported that they had executed the monks on 21 May. The Algerian government announced that their heads had been discovered on May 31; the whereabouts of their bodies is unknown. The funeral Mass for the monks was celebrated in the Catholic Cathedral of Notre-Dame d'Afrique (Our Lady of Africa) in Algiers on Sunday, 2 June 1996. Their remains were buried in the cemetery of the monastery at Tibhirine two days later.

The surviving two monks of Tibhirine left Algeria and travelled to a Trappist community near Fez in Morocco that would become the Priory of Our Lady of Atlas (today in Midelt).

=== The monks ===
All of the murdered monks were French. They were: Dom Christian de Chergé, Brother Luc (born Paul Dochier), Father Christophe (Lebreton), Brother Michel (Fleury), Father Bruno (born Christian Lemarchand), Father Célestin (Ringeard), and Brother Paul (Favre-Miville).

== Accusations against Algerian army ==
In 2008, La Stampa reported that an anonymous high-ranking Western government official, based in Algeria at the time of the murders, had told them that the kidnapping was orchestrated by a DRS-infiltrated GIA group, but that the monks had been killed accidentally by an Algerian military helicopter which attacked the camp where they were being held captive.

In July 2009, the retired French general François Buchwalter, who was military attaché in Algeria at the time, testified to a judge that the monks had been accidentally killed by an Algerian government helicopter during an attack on a guerrilla position, then beheaded after their death to make it appear as though the GIA had killed them.

The day after Buchwalter's statement, former GIA leader Abdelhak Layada — who was in prison when the monks were killed — responded by reiterating the claim that the GIA had beheaded the monks after a breakdown of negotiations with the French secret service.

== Martyrs of Algeria ==
The seven monks of the Our Lady of the Atlas, who were kidnapped and later beheaded, were beatified with twelve other martyrs of Algeria on December 8, 2018. The celebration occurred in Oran, Algeria.

== See also ==
- Of Gods and Men, a 2010 film based on these events
