= Ouamri =

Ouamri وامري
- Commune and town
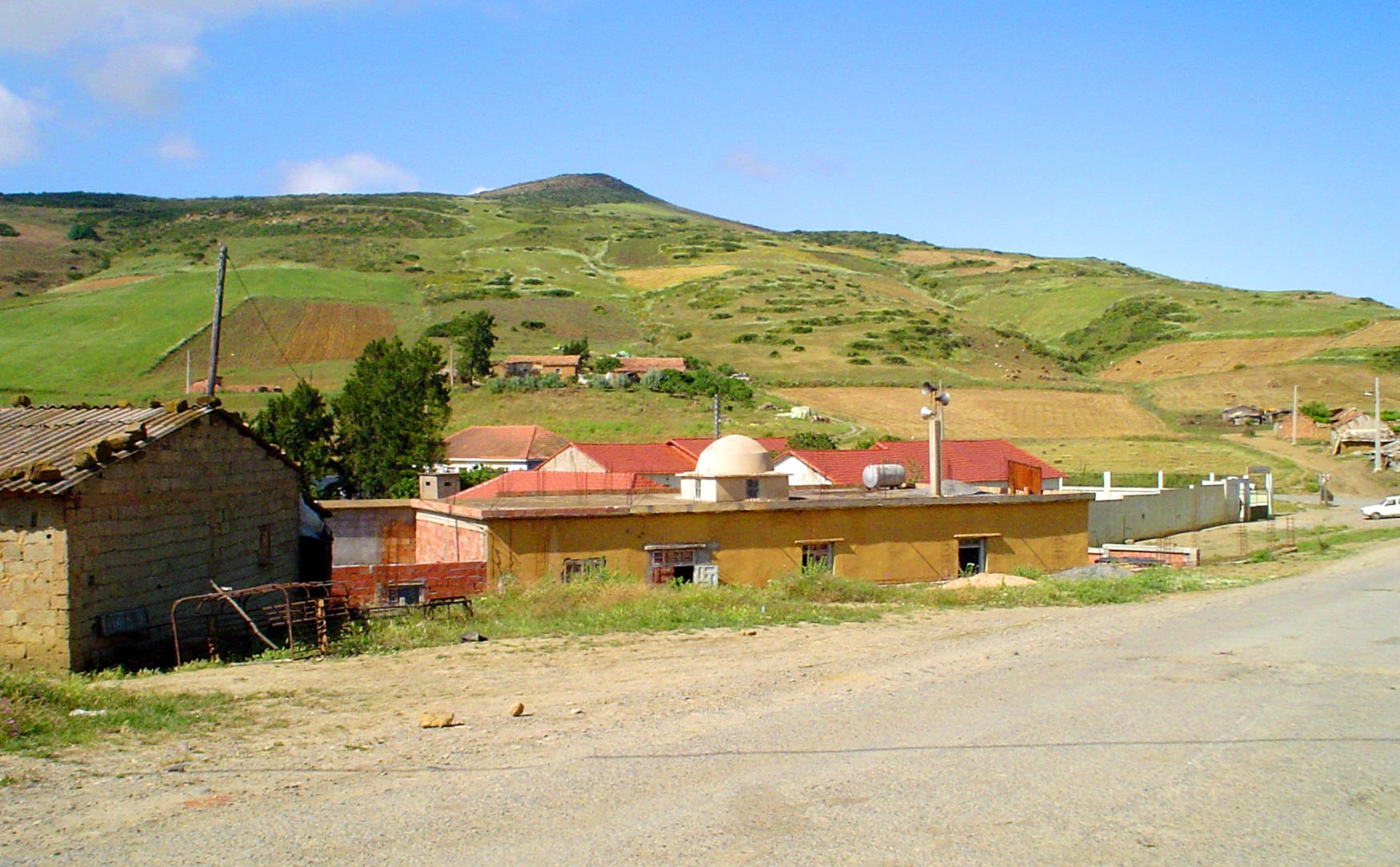
- Village of Sidi Youm in Ouamri

- Location within Algeria
- Coordinates: 36°14′N 2°34′E
- Country: Algeria
- Province: Médéa Province
- District: Ouamri District

Area
  - Total: 34 sq mi (88 km^{2})

Population (2008)
  - Total: 15,978
- Time zone: UTC+1 (CET)
- CP: 26150

Ouamri is a town and commune in Médéa Province, Algeria. According to the 1998 census, it has a population of 14,724.
