= Esther Paniagua Alonso =

20th-century beatified Spanish nun

Esther Paniagua Alonso was a Spanish nun, born in Izagre (León, Spain), on June 7, 1949, daughter of Nicasio Paniagua and Dolores Alonso, and member of the congregation of Augustinian missionaries. As a nurse, she was sent to Algeria where she worked in Bab El Oued, in Algiers. She was murdered in Algiers on October 23, 1994 with sister Caridad Álvarez Martín. On January 27, 2018, Pope Francis recognized the martyrdom of Esther Paniagua Alonso among the martyrs of Algeria and authorized the signing of the beatification decree. She was proclaimed blessed on December 8, 2018.

== Biography ==
At 18 years old, Esther Paniagua entered the novitiate of the Congregation of the Augustinian Missionary Sisters. In August 1970, she pronounced her perpetual vows. As a nurse, she was sent to Algiers. The contact with the Arab world attracted her and refined her sensitivity to Arab culture and Muslim religion. She worked in the hospital where she gave herself totally to the sick, especially to disabled children. In 1994, when faced with the Algerian Civil War, when asked if she was afraid of the situation she replied : "No one can take our life because we have already given it. Nothing will happen to us since we are in the hands of God ... and if something happens to us, we are still in His hands". Despite the solicitations of her hierarchy and of the Spanish ambassador to Algeria, she refused to leave the country. Thus, during the community reflection to make discernment between the choice to stay or to leave, she said to her sisters "At this moment, for me, the perfect model is Jesus: he suffered, he had to overcome difficulties and ended in the failure of the cross, from which springs the source of life."

On October 23, 1994, as they were returning home after the celebration Sunday Mass at St. Joseph's Chapel of the Little Sisters of Jesus, a few hundred meters away, she was killed with three bullets to the head, and died instantly. Sister Caridad Álvarez Martín who accompanied her died a few hours later at the hospital. The Algerian authorities consider that the attack was due to the Armed Islamic Group.

== Beatification ==
Sister Esther Paniagua Alonso is one of nineteen Catholic religious murdered in Algeria between 1994 and 1996.

On January 27, 2018, the Holy See recognized the martyrdom of Sister Esther and decided to beatify her, with the martyrs of Algeria. The beatification ceremony took place on December 8, 2018 in Algeria, in Oran.

== Bibliography ==
- Martin McGee, Christian Martyrs for a Muslim People, Mahwah, NJ, Paulist Press, 2008, 203 pages (ISBN 978-0-8091-4539-3), p. 46-52.
