= Tamié Abbey =

Trappist monastery in Savoie, France

Coordinates: 45°41′13″N 6°18′15″E

Tamié Abbey (Abbaye de Tamié or Abbaye Notre-Dame-de-Tamié) is a Cistercian monastery, located in the Bauges mountain range in the Savoie region of France.

== History ==
The monastery was founded in 1132, as a daughter house of Bonnevaux Abbey, by Peter of Tarentaise, who was also the first abbot. The abbey adopted the reforms initiated by Armand Jean le Bouthillier de Rancé in 1677. In 1797, during the French revolution, the community was forced to leave the premises and the buildings and land were sold to individuals.

In 1835, king Charles X bought the monastery back and donated it to the bishop of Chambéry to establish pious works there. Finally, in 1861, Trappist monks from the Grace-Dieu Abbey in Besancon bought the monastery and returned to establish a new community. Christophe Lebreton, one of the Tibhirine martyrs, entered the monastery before moving to the Abbey of Our Lady of Atlas in Algeria.

It continues as a Trappist community of 30 monks, famous for its cheese, Abbaye de Tamié.
