= Ouamri District =

Coordinates: 36°14′N 2°34′E

- District
- Country: Algeria
- Province: Médéa Province
- Time zone: UTC+1 (CET)

Ouamri District is a district of Médéa Province, Algeria. In 2008 the population was 25,909.

The district is further divided into 3 municipalities:

- Ouamri
- Oued Harbil
- Hannacha
