= Little Sisters of the Sacred Heart =

Catholic religious congregation of nuns

The Little Sisters of the Sacred Heart are a religious congregation of contemplative nuns in the world, founded by a Belgian widow Alida Capart in 1933 in Montpellier (Hérault, France) and whose spirituality is inspired by Father Charles de Foucauld (Blessed Charles of Jesus, 1858-1916). "Nazareth can be lived anywhere".

After the Second Vatican Council, they left the habit and adapted their constitutions to live more mixed with people, in a "living with", among the most disadvantaged, favoring simplicity and fraternal joy. "We try to discover the ways of inner silence that open to God and to others" (Constitutions)).

Today these nuns are around fifty divided into small fraternities in Algeria, Tunisia, Mali, Burkina Faso, Bolivia, France and Spain, where they are in the last two countries mainly in small apartments "on the periphery". The general fraternity is in Rosny-sous-Bois and the formation fraternity in L'Île-Saint-Denis, on the outskirts of Paris.

The congregation has a blessed, Sister Odette Prévost (1932-1995), a French nun who is one of the nineteen Martyrs of Algeria, beatified in 2018.
