= Abbaye de Tamié =

Soft cheese made from unpasteurised cow's milk by the monks of Tamié Abbey

Coordinates: 45.6871°N 6.3043°E

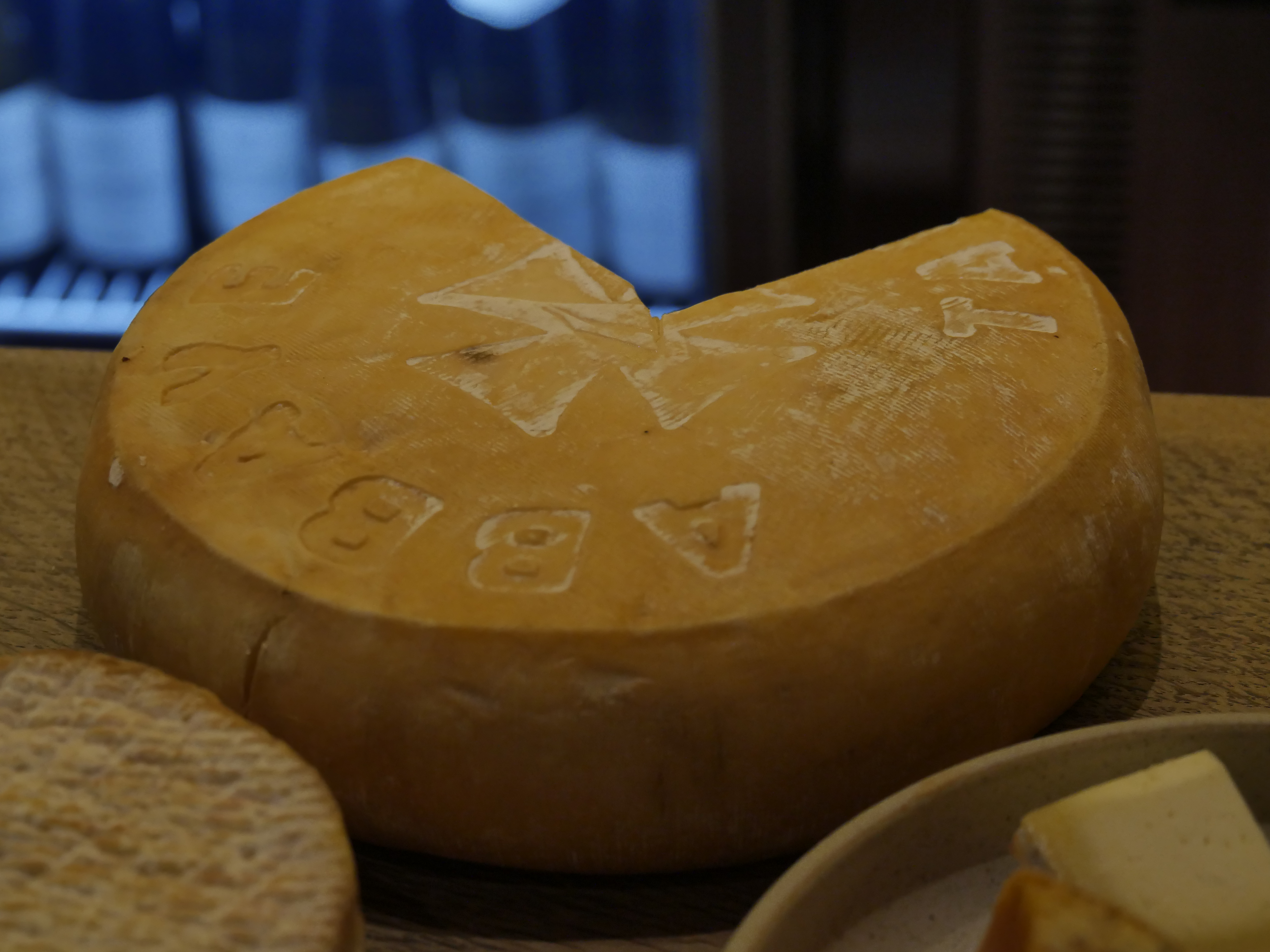
- Country of origin: France
- Region, town: Savoie
- Source of milk: Cows
- Pasteurised: No
- Texture: Soft cheese
- Aging time: 4-8 weeks

Abbaye de Tamié (French pronunciation: [abei də tamje]) is a soft cheese made from unpasteurised cow's milk, similar in style to Reblochon and produced exclusively by the monks of Tamié Abbey, near to Albertville in the Savoie département, in the French Alps.

== Style ==
Tamié is pressed and molded in the form of a flat wheel of cheese with slightly convex edge. It is distinguished by the saffron colour of the crust that, in the final aging process, is covered with a light white down. The creamy soft cheese is even in texture, but with a slightly firmer centre. About 400 kg (880 lb) is produced each day from the milk of cows from 8 farms in the valley. The monks market it in two styles:

- " Petit Tamié" (550 to 600 grams; 19 to 21 oz) sold individually.
- " Grand Tamié" (1.4 to 1.5 kg; 3.1 to 3.3 lb), with a thinner crust and softer, sold individually or cut,

== Manufacture ==
Unpasteurised whole milk is warmed to 34 °C (93 °F). Cultivated fermenters, made at the abbey, are added. This is then left to coagulate for about 90 minutes. The natural rennet is added to obtain the solids. When this is sufficiently firm, the curdle is cut using special knives, to separate the curds and whey. The time and the speed of the cutting regulates the size of the curds to that of a pea. The mixture is then left for 20 minutes to drain, then placed in moulds with small drainage holes and pressed by machine to remove any remaining liquids for about 4 hours. The whey is not wasted, but processed into methane which is used to heat the abbey's hot water system.

The cheeses are removed from the presses and put onto pallets which are then immersed in a bath of salty water for 2 or 3 hours, according to the size. Salting has several functions: it affects the taste, crust formation and is a preserving agent. The cheeses are then ready to be matured in the cellar where they will lose some weight in accordance with the age-old tradition of the "Angels' share". Cheeses are aged in the vaulted cellars of the abbey where the temperature is maintained at 14 °C (57 °F), with high humidity. They will be turned manually every other day. To maintain the crust and encourage the development of the mould on the surface, the cheeses are again bathed in brine and then rubbed and returned to the shelves to mature. The mould is naturally present in the cellar. When they have attained their optimum maturity, they are packed and labeled by hand. The label conveys important manufacturing information and the best-before date (about 45 days after packing).

== See also ==
- List of cheeses
