= Ecclesia in Africa =

Apostolic exhortation

Ecclesia in Africa Latin for 'The Church in Africa' Apostolic exhortation of Pope John Paul II
- Signature date: 14 September 1995
- Number: 8 of 15 of the pontificate
- Text: In Latin; In English

Ecclesia in Africa (English: The Church in Africa) is a post-synodal apostolic exhortation written by Pope John Paul II, published on 14 September 1995. It follows the 1994 Special Assembly for Africa of the Synod of Bishops which was held in Rome.
