= Mibladen =

- commune
- Interactive map of Mibladen
- Coordinates: 32°46′N 4°38′W
- Country: Morocco
- Region: Drâa-Tafilalet
- Province: Midelt

Population (2004)
  - Total: 3,087
- Time zone: UTC+0 (GMT)

Mibladen is a commune in Midelt Province of the Drâa-Tafilalet administrative region of Morocco. At the time of the 2004 census, the commune had a total population of 3,087 people living in 573 households.
