= Midelt =

Midelt میدلت (Arabic) ⵎⵉⴷⵍⵜ (Standard Moroccan Tamazight)
- City
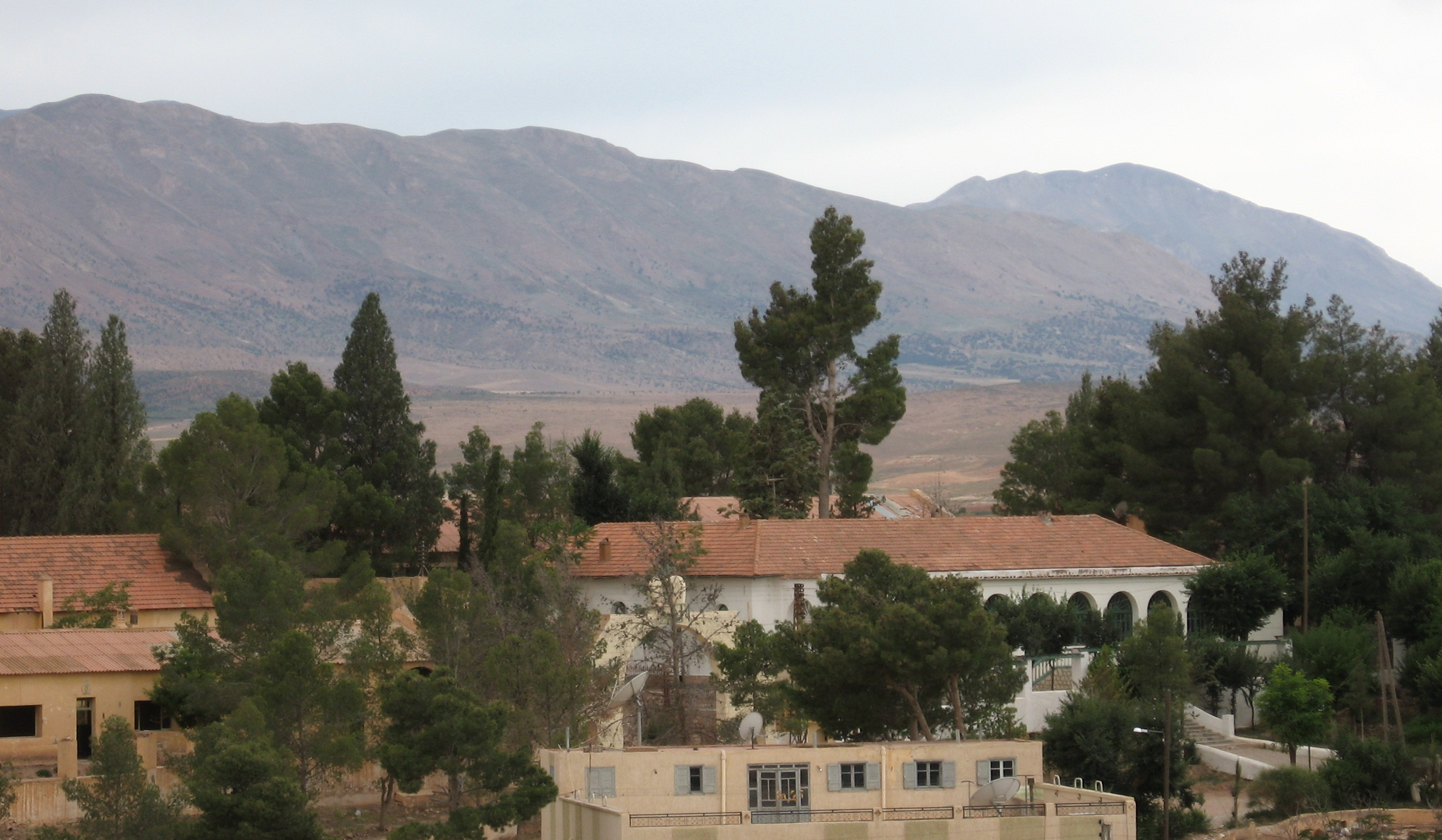
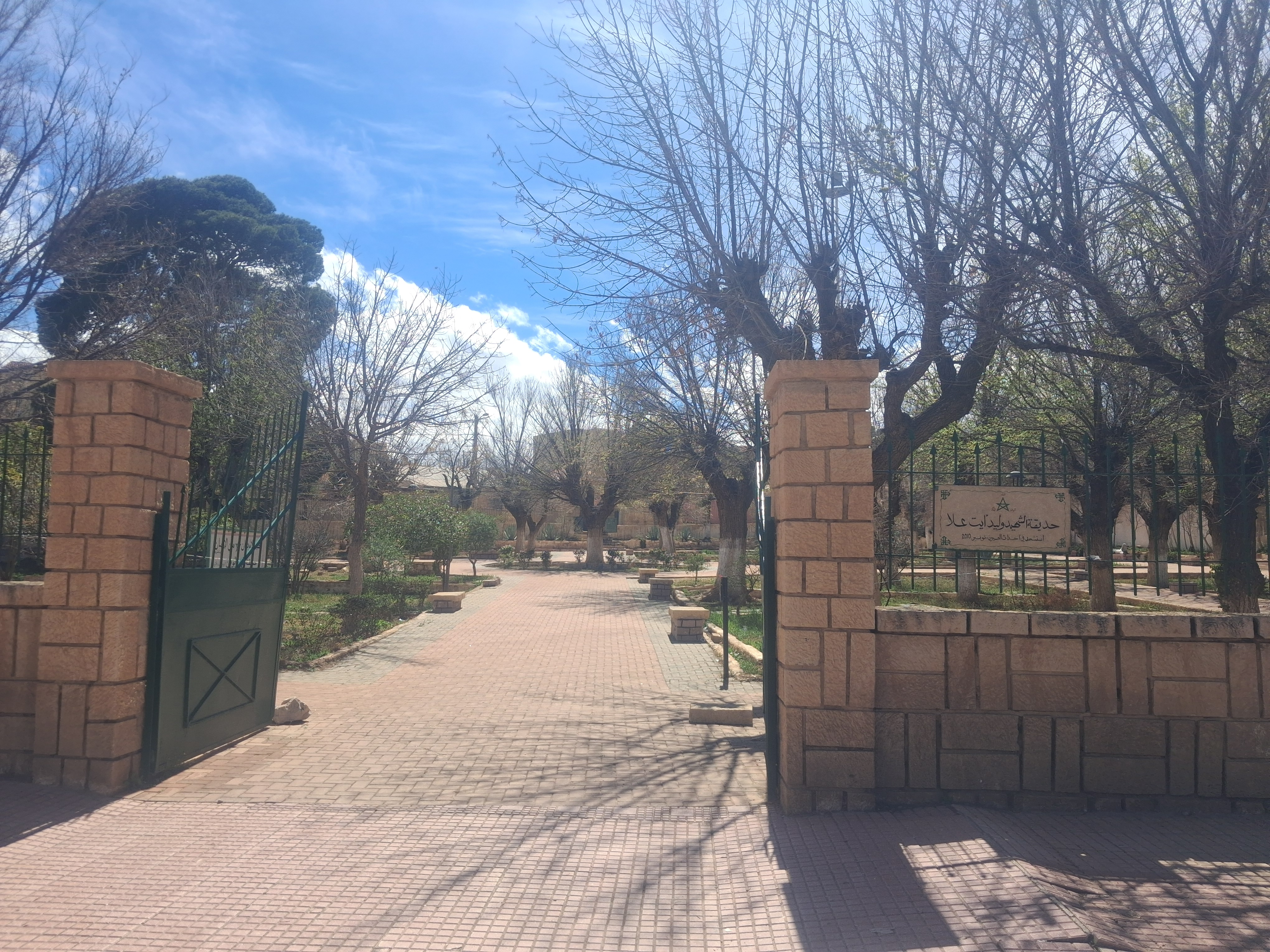
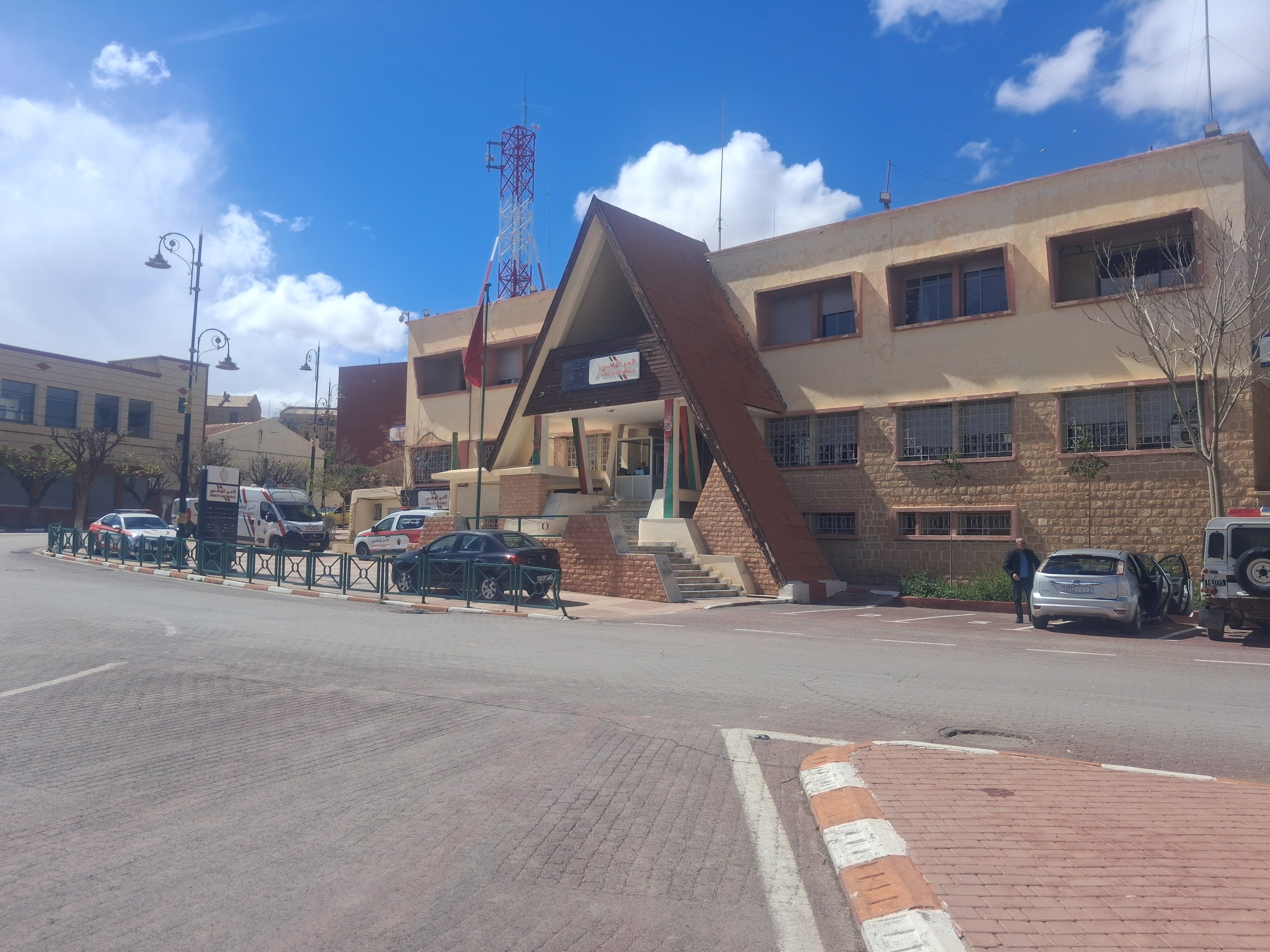
- Interactive map of Midelt
- Coordinates: 32°40′48″N 4°43′48″W
- Country: Morocco
- Region: Drâa-Tafilalet
- Province: Midelt
- Elevation: 1,508 m (4,948 ft)

Population (2024)
  - Total: 62,648
- Time zone: UTC+0 (GMT)

Midelt (Note: Arabic: ميدلت Standard Moroccan Tamazight: ⵎⵉⴷⵍⵜ) is a city in Morocco, located the high plateau between the Middle Atlas and High Atlas mountain ranges. With a population of 62,648 recorded in the 2024 Moroccan census, it is the capital and namesake of Midelt Province.

Midelt serves as the commercial center of a large agricultural hinterland. It is also one of Morocco's principal cities for the mining of several minerals.

== History ==
Midelt during the French protectorate

Before the French protectorate, Midelt was a cluster of ksar called Aoutat n-Ayt Izdeg. The modern town's name is a French corruption of the word timidelt (dish-cover) from a local hill.

Midelt grew in the first half of the 20th century around a French administrative post by the same name. Previously, villages and ksour had dotted the fertile surroundings. The French established their post to facilitate the mining of lead, gypsum, other minerals, and fossils in the nearby Ahouli and Mibladen mines and elsewhere. The development of these mines led to the construction of a railroad from Midelt to the Mediterranean coast and the electrification of Midelt in 1930. In Morocco, only Casablanca received electricity earlier. The Franciscan Missionaries of Mary founded the Kasbah Miryam des Soeurs in 1926 which later would become the Priory of our Lady of the Atlas.

After Moroccan independence in 1956, control reverted to the Moroccan government. Midelt is currently the provincial capital of Midelt Province.

== Geography ==
Midelt is situated on the main road between Fes and Meknes to the north and Errachidia to the south. Geographically, it is situated in the high plains surrounding the Moulouya River, between the Middle and High Atlas mountain ranges.

The city's elevation is 1,508 metres (4,948 ft), making it one of the highest large towns in Morocco.

=== Climate ===
Midelt has a cold desert climate (Köppen: BWk). The elevation of Midelt and its relative proximity to the North Atlantic Ocean cools the daily temperatures to make Midelt one of the most temperate of the inland towns. However, many coastal towns have milder temperatures, warmer in winter and cooler in summer.

Every winter, when a cold damp air coming from the north west influence Western Europe and Morocco, temperatures can fall dramatically well below -10 degrees Celsius in Midelt. However, these extreme conditions don't last for more than 5 continuous days.

Temperature averages, from the years 1961 to 1990, yield daily maximum/minimum temperatures for January as 12.3 / 0.6 degrees Celsius and for July as 32.6 / 16.3 degrees Celsius. Snow is common in winter, and precipitation continues throughout the year at moderate levels. However, the principal water source of the region is a spring at the foot of Jbel Ayachi, 10 kilometres (6 mi) south of Midelt.

A dam moderating the flow from the spring was destroyed by a flood in early 2006 following heavy snows the previous winter, damaging the nearby village of Tattiwin.

Climate data for Midelt (1991–2020, extremes 1930–1963 and 1965–present) (Note: The record highs and lows are based on the Deutscher Wetterdienst link for the period 1930–1963 while records beyond 1965 come from the Meteo Climat link. As a result, the most extreme values from either source are used.)
Month	Jan	Feb	Mar	Apr	May	Jun	Jul	Aug	Sep	Oct	Nov	Dec	Year
Record high °C (°F)	24.0 (75.2)	26.1 (79.0)	29.0 (84.2)	32.0 (89.6)	34.8 (94.6)	37.7 (99.9)	43.1 (109.6)	43.2 (109.8)	38.7 (101.7)	31.9 (89.4)	28.0 (82.4)	24.0 (75.2)	43.2 (109.8)
Mean daily maximum °C (°F)	12.6 (54.7)	14.0 (57.2)	16.9 (62.4)	20.0 (68.0)	24.2 (75.6)	29.7 (85.5)	34.1 (93.4)	33.1 (91.6)	27.7 (81.9)	22.4 (72.3)	16.4 (61.5)	13.5 (56.3)	22.1 (71.8)
Daily mean °C (°F)	6.7 (44.1)	8.0 (46.4)	10.7 (51.3)	13.4 (56.1)	17.2 (63.0)	21.9 (71.4)	25.9 (78.6)	25.2 (77.4)	20.7 (69.3)	16.1 (61.0)	10.7 (51.3)	7.9 (46.2)	15.4 (59.7)
Mean daily minimum °C (°F)	0.9 (33.6)	2.0 (35.6)	4.4 (39.9)	6.8 (44.2)	10.2 (50.4)	14.1 (57.4)	17.7 (63.9)	17.3 (63.1)	13.6 (56.5)	9.8 (49.6)	5.0 (41.0)	2.2 (36.0)	8.7 (47.7)
Record low °C (°F)	−14.0 (6.8)	−16.0 (3.2)	−8.0 (17.6)	−3.8 (25.2)	−1.0 (30.2)	3.0 (37.4)	7.6 (45.7)	2.8 (37.0)	0.0 (32.0)	−5.0 (23.0)	−7.0 (19.4)	−13.5 (7.7)	−16.0 (3.2)
Average precipitation mm (inches)	14.1 (0.56)	13.1 (0.52)	19.2 (0.76)	15.9 (0.63)	20.0 (0.79)	10.8 (0.43)	6.8 (0.27)	15.5 (0.61)	19.5 (0.77)	22.1 (0.87)	17.9 (0.70)	10.9 (0.43)	185.8 (7.31)
Average precipitation days (≥ 1.0)	2.8	2.7	4.1	3.0	3.5	2.3	1.7	3.4	3.6	3.6	3.6	2.7	37.0
Average relative humidity (%)	73	71	74	76	73	67	58	56	69	72	76	70	70
Mean monthly sunshine hours	240.6	231.8	259.3	278.9	301.4	309.3	301.7	274.6	252.9	247.7	237.9	229.2	3,165.3
Source 1: NOAA (sun 1981–2010)
Source 2: Deutscher Wetterdienst (record highs for February to March only, record lows, and humidity), Meteo Climat (all other record highs and lows)

== Demographics ==
Midelt Population
Year	Pop.	±% p.a.
2004	44,730	—
2014	55,063	+2.10%
2024	62,648	+1.30%
Census data from 2004, 2014 and 2024

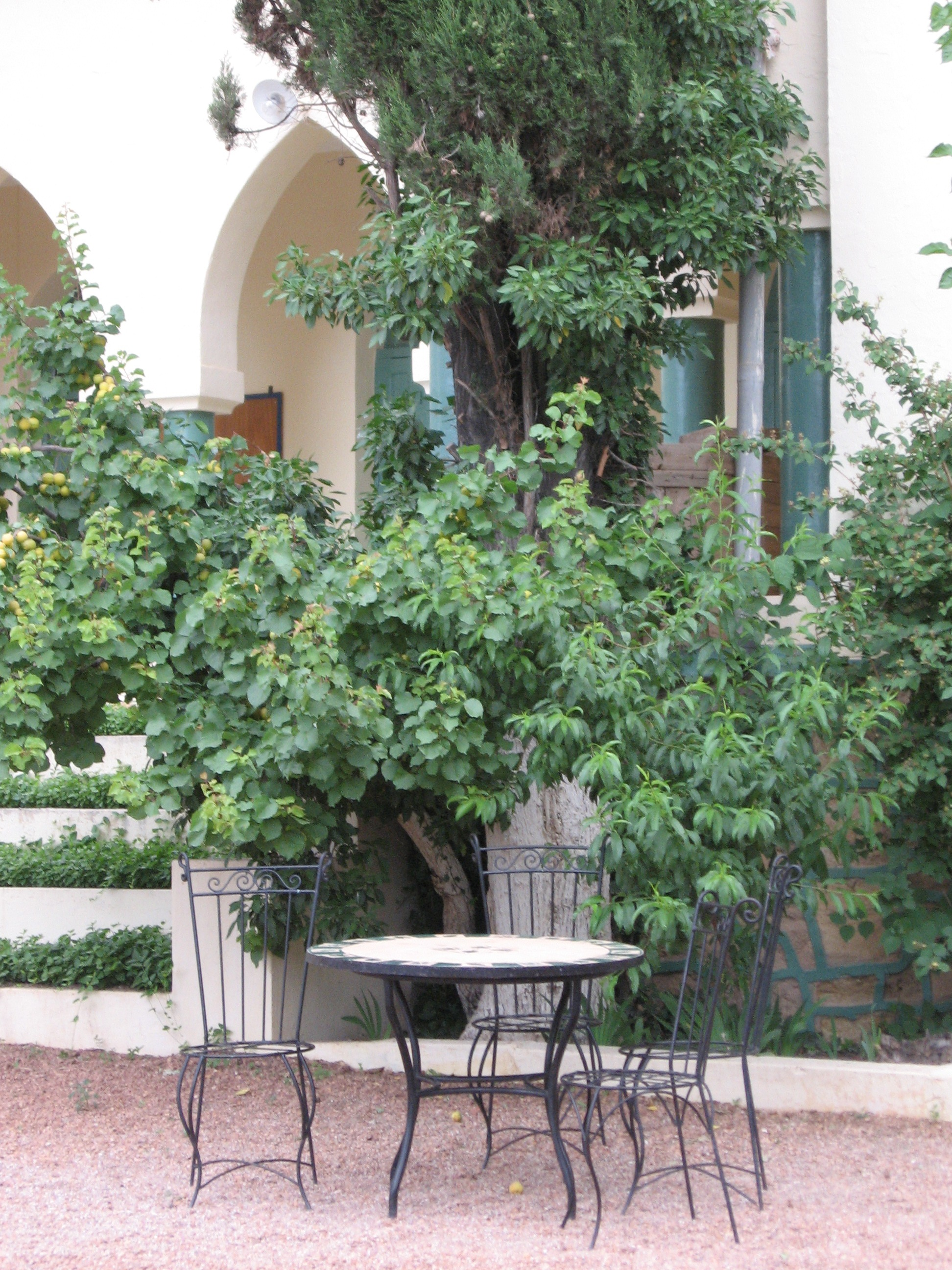
Cultural centre Tarik Ibn Ziad, Formerly the French governor's residence

Midelt is a largely Berber city. Berber residents speak the Central Atlas Tamazight (Ait Ayache) language but most can also use the dialect of Darija. Educated residents also speak Standard Arabic as well as French, which are used throughout Morocco in mass media, education, and government.

Because Midelt is a new city, almost all Mideltis can trace their roots either to one of the nearby villages or to elsewhere in Morocco. The city also lacks the sharply defined neighborhood divisions and traditional souqs of older Moroccan cities.

Very few non-natives live in Midelt. Of these, the longest established are a community of Franciscan nuns and Cistercian monks (namely Trappists) living at the Priory of Our Lady of Atlas in a nearby village. The nuns work with local women and girls to develop handcrafts and teach hygiene, French language, and other skills.

== Economy ==
Midelt is renowned for its mineral and crystal markets

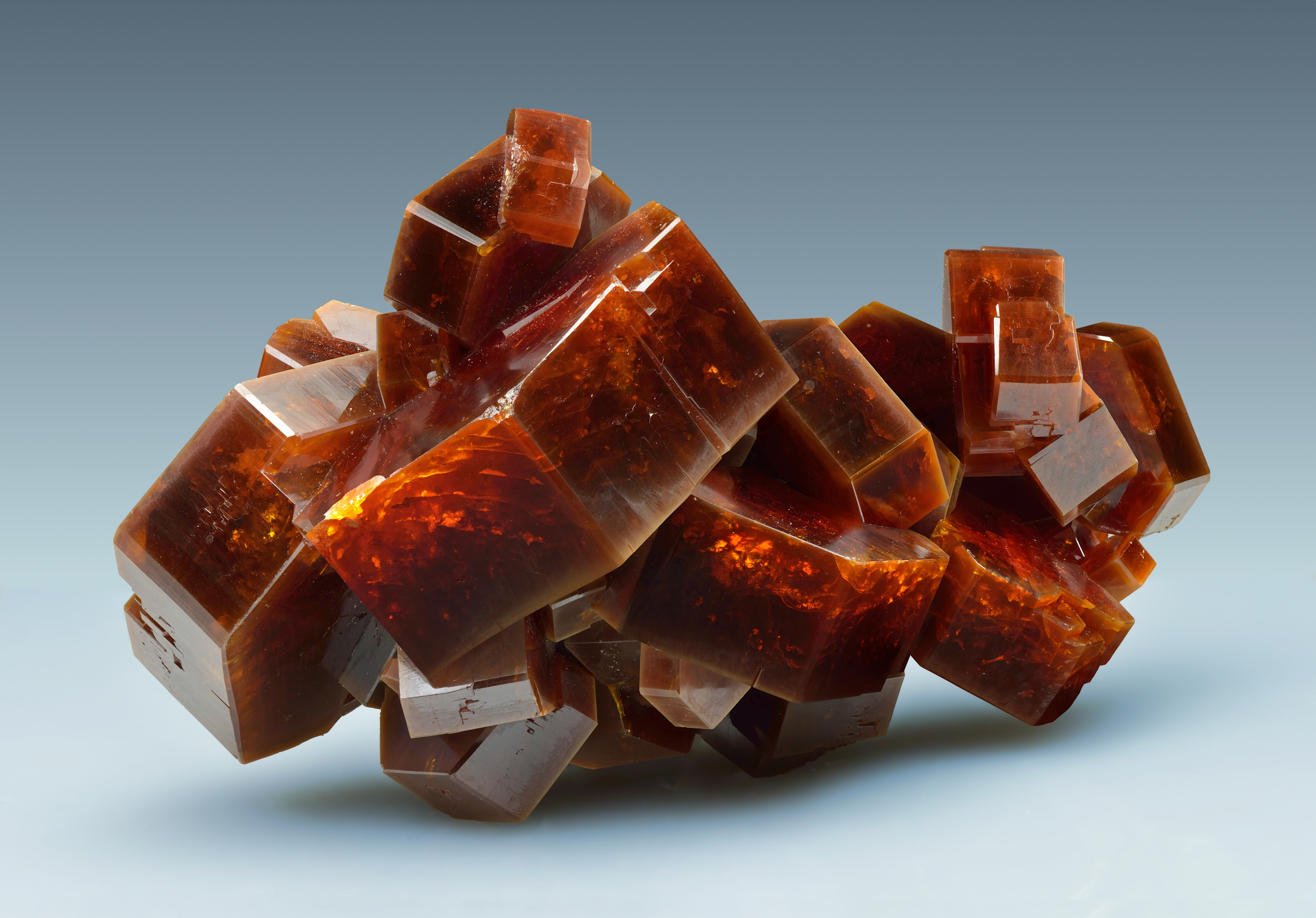
Vanadinite from Mibladen

The Apple monument, Morocco is the 18th-biggest apple-producing country, With nearly 90% of output coming from Midelt Province Smallholders

Midelt functions as the market for an agricultural area extending from the Moulouya River to Jbel Ayachi, bounded on the east and west by dry plains. This region is best known for apples; other produce includes walnuts, apricots, plums, pomegranates, wheat, corn, and a wide variety of garden vegetables.

Nomads and sedentary farmers from the surrounding area also raise sheep and goats for slaughter and for wool. Both of these are sold in Midelt, but largely for local consumption. Locally gathered evidence indicates that the local price of meat is inversely related to rainfall: in wet years, nomads can keep their herds alive through the summer and do not bring them to market; in dry years, animals are better sold than lost to draught.

Midelt's industrial sector is largely related to the nearby mines, of which only Mibladen continues to operate at high capacity. Lead, gypsum, and a host of lesser-known minerals are extracted for sale to industry and for household decorations.

Tourism continues to grow as an important source of revenue for Midelt. The climate attracts many visitors, mostly Moroccans from lower climes and émigrés to Europe. These support several small hotels as well as two larger establishments catering to Europeans. In addition to visitors, local handcrafts - especially carpets and blankets in the roughhewn nomadic style - are sold through cooperatives and merchants both locally and in Morocco's larger cities.

== Notable people ==
- Khalid Skah, former runner
- Fadwa Sidi Madane, former runner
- L'Morphine, rapper songwriter
