= Abdelhak Layada =

Algerian Islamist

Abdelhak Layada (Arabic: عبد الحق العيايدة; born 1959), also known as Abu Adlane, is one of the founders of Algeria's militant Islamist group Armed Islamic Group (GIA) during the Algerian Civil War. He led the group after the death of Mohamed Allel ("Moh Leveilly").

He declared his group independent of the existing Islamic Armed Movement (MIA) in January 1993. He was arrested in Morocco and handed over to the Algerian authorities on 29 September 1993. He was sentenced to death in June 1995. He claims to regret the killing of innocent civilians for which the GIA became notorious, blaming it on his successors who controlled the GIA while he was in prison.

Layada was released from prison on 12 March 2006 under President Abdelaziz Bouteflika's "Charter for Peace and National Reconciliation". He now lives in his previous home in Baraki, not far south of Algiers.
