= 19 martyrs of Algeria =

Individuals slain during the Algerian Civil War

Blessed 19 martyrs of Algeria

Priests; Bishop; Religious; Martyrs
- Born: Various; Various places
- Died: 1994 to 1996; Various places (all in Algeria)
- Venerated in: Catholic Church
- Beatified: 8 December 2018, Notre-Dame de Santa Cruz, Oran, Algeria by Cardinal Giovanni Angelo Becciu
- Feast: 8 May
- Attributes: Palm; Trappist habit
- Patronage: Ecumenism; Missionaries

The 19 martyrs of Algeria were a group of nineteen individuals slain in Algeria between 1994 and 1996 during the Algerian Civil War. They all were religious priests or religious sisters , including seven Trappist monks one was a bishop. Their nations of origin were France (15), French protectorate of Tunisia (1), Spain (2), and Belgium (1).

Their collective cause for beatification opened on 31 March 2007 titling them as Servants of God. Pope Francis confirmed their upcoming beatification in 2018, and the group was beatified in Oran on 8 December 2018.

== Tibhirine monks and Claverie ==
The Martyrs of Algeria refers to nineteen individuals slain during the course of the Algerian Civil War from 1994 until the death of the Bishop of Oran, Pierre Claverie in 1996. Who ultimately killed the Trappists the Trappist monks from the Atlas monastery, remains controversial since there are reports that the regular armed forces or the Armed Islamic Group carried out the killings with the latter having owned up to the executions themselves.

The seven Trappist monks from their Atlas monastery were kidnapped at around 1:15am on 27 March 1996 after 20 armed men stormed the place and took the monks prisoner leaving two other, overlooked monks in separate rooms. The telephone lines had been cut meaning a call to police was impossible for the two hidden monks while an enforced curfew meant the two could not drive to the nearest police station. The seven monks were all beheaded two months later and were discovered though the bodies were not. The funeral for the monks was celebrated at Notre-Dame d'Afrique in Algiers on 2 June and their remains were interred at the Tibhirine convent on 4 June.

== Beatified ==
The nineteen beati were:

- killed on 8 May 1994 in Algiers, Algeria:
  - Henri Vergès was born 15 July 1930 in Matemale, Pyrénées-Orientales, France; and made his perpetual vows as a member of the Marist Brothers at the age of 22. From 1958 to 1966 he served as the sub-master of novices in Corrèze and on 6 August 1969 arrived in Algeria. He served as the director of the Saint Bonaventure School in Algiers from 1969 to 1976 and served as a mathematics teacher from that point until 1988. He was murdered alongside Sr. Paul-Hélène in his office in the afternoon. Cardinal Léon-Étienne Duval celebrated his funeral.
  - Paul-Hélène Saint Raymond (born 24 January 1927 in Paris, France); was an engineer who in 1952 entered the Little Sisters of the Assumption; she made her perpetual vows in 1960. From 1954 to 1957 she worked with families in Creil before doing nursing in Paris. But she desired to work in the missions in Latin America and was content when she was sent in 1963 to Algiers. She remained there until 1974 when she was sent to Tunis and then in 1975 to Casablanca where she remained until returning to Algiers in 1984. She worked with premature babies in Casablanca and back in Algiers worked as a school nurse.
- killed on 23 October 1994 in Bab-el-Oued, Algiers, Algeria:
  - María Caridad Álvarez Martín was born 9 May 1933 in Santa Cruz de Salceda, Burgos. In 1955, she entered the Augustinian Missionary Sisters and was then sent to Algeria where she made her perpetual vows on 3 May 1960. Her delicate health forced her to return to Spain though she later returned to Algeria after she had made a sufficient improvement in her health. She tended to the old and ill. Martín was slain alongside Esther Alonso as the two sisters were returning from Mass.
  - Esther Paniagua Alonso was born 7 June 1949 in Izagre, León, Spain to Nicasio Paniagua and Dolores Alonso. When she was eighteen, she entered the Augustinian Missionary Sisters and made her perpetual vows in 1970. She then studied nursing and was sent to Algeria where she learnt Arabic and about the Islamic culture. Alonso tended to the ill in hospital though prioritized herself on helping handicapped children who referred to Alonso as "their angel". She read the Quran in order to have a better understanding of the Muslim people that she worked with. She and María Martin were killed while returning from Mass.
- killed on 27 December 1994 in Tizi-Ouzou, Algeria:
  - Alain Dieulangard was born 21 May 1919 in Saint-Brieuc, Côtes-d'Armor, France. He studied law and graduated in 1943 at the same time that he entered the congregation of the White Fathers. He made his vows in Thibar on 29 June 1949 and was ordained to the priesthood on 1 February 1950. He worked in teaching and administration in Kabylie and was killed in the mission courtyard with three others of his order.
  - Charles Decker was born 26 December 1924 in Antwerp, Belgium and joined the White Fathers after completing his education and made his oath on 21 July 1949 prior to being ordained as a priest on 8 April 1950. He studied Arabic in Tunis prior to his 1955 appointment in overseeing a youth hostel. In 1982 he moved to Yemen but returned to Algeria in 1987 as the parish priest of Our Lady of Africa. He was killed with three others of his order in the mission courtyard.
  - Jean Chevillard was born 27 August 1925 in Angers, Maine-et-Loire, France and entered the White Fathers after he completed his education. He was sixteen when he arrived in Northern Africa and he made his vows on 29 June 1949 prior to being ordained as a priest in Carthage on 1 July 1950. Four armed men burst into his office towards noon while he was sorting through the mail and killed him.
  - Christian Chessel was born 27 October 1958 in Digne, Alpes-de-Haute-Provence, France and obtained an engineering diploma in 1981, prior to serving as a volunteer in Côte d'Ivoire until 1983. He entered the White Fathers in 1985 and made his vows in Rome on 26 November 1991. He was ordained as a priest on 28 June 1992 and was killed in the mission courtyard with three others of the congregation after a machine gunner opened fire.
- killed on 3 September 1995 in Belcourt, Algiers, Algeria:
  - Bibiane Leclerc was born 8 January 1930 in Gazeran, Yvelines, France and entered the Sisters of Our Lady of the Apostles on 4 March 1959. She made her first vows on 8 March 1961 prior to being sent to Algeria to Constantine where she worked in a maternity ward. In 1964 she was sent to Algiers to assume charge of a sewing center for underprivileged students. Bibiane Leclerc was killed with Angèle-Marie Littlejohn around 100 meters from the convent after having left Mass in the afternoon.
  - Angèle-Marie Littlejohn was born 22 November 1933 in Tunis, French protectorate of Tunisia; her father was from Għargħur Malta, Angèle-Marie entered the Sisters of Our Lady of the Apostles in 1957 and made her first vows on 8 September 1959, before arriving in Bouzarea to aid in the running of an orphanage and boarding school for girls. She remained there from 1959 until 1964 when she started working at the Algiers School of Art in Belcourt where she worked until her death. She left Mass in the afternoon alongside Bibiane Leclerc and was killed ten minutes later en route to the mission house.
- killed on 10 November 1995 in Algiers, Algeria:
  - Odette Prévost was born 17 July 1932 in Oger, Marne, France and began teaching English from 1950 to 1953 prior to entering the Little Sisters of the Sacred Heart in 1953; she made her perpetual vows in 1959. In 1958 she left on a mission to Kbab in Morocco before heading to Argenteuil in France and then to Algiers in 1968. She often read the Quran to better understand the Muslim population. The bullets of a terrorist killed her as she was heading to Mass.
- killed on 21 May 1996 near Médéa, Algeria:
  - Christian de Chergé was born 18 January 1937 in Colmar, Haut-Rhin, France He was the prior of Our Lady of the Atlas monastery from 1984 until his death; known for his love of the Muslim people and his studies into Islam and Islamic culture. Pope John Paul II commemorated the slain in his Pentecost address in which he remembered their "witness of love" and "honor to the Church".
  - Luc Dochier was born 31 January 1914 in Bourg-de-Péage, Drôme, France ; He was said to have been gruff but well-liked and noted for his extensive work with the ill. He studied medicine and then did civil service in Morocco as a medical lieutenant. He entered the Trappists at Aiguebelle on 7 December 1941. He served as a voluntary prisoner in Germany]from 1943 to 1945 after having taken the place of a father of a family. In 1946 he left for Tibhirine and made his perpetual vows on 15 August 1949. In 1959 he and another monk were kidnapped by the A.L.N. but were released after two weeks.
  - Christophe Lebreton born 11 October 1950 in Blois, Loir-et-Cher, France. He was the last born child for his parents and aged twelve began his ecclesial studies. But he left at the end of high school and did his civil service in Algeria before going to learn law. On 1 November 1974 he entered the Trappists at Tamié and left for Tibhirine during the course of his novitiate. In 1977 he returned to Tamié where he made his solemn vows on 1 November 1980. He moved to the Atlas monastery in 1980 after his profession and was ordained as a priest a decade later on 1 January 1990.
  - Michel Fleury was born 21 May 1944 in Sainte-Anne, Loire-Atlantique, France. He worked on the farm at home until he was seventeen before spending the next nine years undergoing his ecclesial studies. He spent the next decade in Prado working in a factory in Lyon and then in both Paris and Marseille before entering the Trappists at Bellefontaine in November 1980. He left for Tibhirine in 1984 and made his solemn vows on 28 August 1986.
  - Bruno Lemarchand was born 1 March 1930 in Saint-Maixent, Deux-Sèvres, France. He began his ecclesial studies after high school in Poitiers and did his civil service in Algeria from 1951 to 1953. He was ordained to the priesthood on 2 April 1956 and from 1956 to 1980 taught at the Saint Charles de Thouars college. Aged 51, he entered the Trappists at Bellefontaine and then left for Tibhirine in 1984. He made his solemn vows on 21 March 1990.
  - Célestin Ringeard was born 27 July 1933 in Touvois, Loire-Atlantique, France. He worked with his father as a blacksmith and later became an expert plumber. His mother died in 1984, and he then entered the Trappists at Tamié in 1984. He left for Tibhirine in 1989 and made his perpetual vows on 20 August 1991.
  - Paul Favre-Miville (born 17 April 1939 in Vinzier, Haute-Savoie, France; professed religious of the Trappists)
- killed on 1 August 1996 in Oran, Algeria:
  - Pierre Claverie was born 8 May 1938 in Algiers, department of Alger, in French Algeria. He was a religious priest of the Order of Preachers and Bishop of Oran. Bishop Claverie was killed alongside his Muslim friend and driver on 1 August 1996 in a bombing and was known for his ecumenism and his collaboration with the Muslim people. He was also a prolific writer on interfaith dialogue which he had made a focus for his episcopal career. He was noted for his mastering of Classical Arabic which he instructed.

== Commemorations ==
On 30 May 2016, the Mayor of Paris, Anne Hidalgo, unveiled a plaque to commemorate the seven Tibhirine monks at a ceremony naming a garden in the square Saint Ambrose in the 6th arrondissement in their honor as Square des Moines Tibhirine.

When Pope Leo XIV was elected on 8 May 2025, the feast day of the martyrs, the Cardinal of Algiers Jean-Paul Vesco invited the pope to visit Algeria. Leo XIV accepted, and a trip was scheduled for 13—15 April 2026, the first visit to Algeria by a pope.

== Beatification ==
The first step towards the beatification came on 5 July 2006, when it was decided that the diocesan process of investigation would take place not in Oran but in the capital Algiers. The beginning of the cause came under Pope Benedict XVI on 31 March 2007 after the Congregation for the Causes of Saints titled them all as Servants of God and issued the nihil obstat ("nothing against"). The diocesan process was opened on 5 October 2007 under Henri Teissier and was closed on 9 July 2012 under Ghaleb Moussa Abdalla Bader. The Congregation for the Causes of Saints validated this process on 15 February 2013 and received the positio for assessment in 2016.

On 1 September 2017, the Archbishop of Algiers Paul Jacques Marie Desfarges and the Bishop of Oran, Jean-Paul Vesco, met with Pope Francis in a private audience to discuss the cause since theologians had approved the cause at that stage. This meant the Congregation needed to approve it before it would be taken to Francis for papal approval. The pope encouraged the bishops and encouraged the cause to proceed. Francis approved the cause on 26 January 2018. The Algerian government granted permission in April 2018 for the beatification to be celebrated on national soil after consultation with ecclesial authorities. The beatification was celebrated in Oran on 8 December 2018 with Cardinal Giovanni Angelo Becciu presiding on the pope's behalf. The postulator for this cause is the Trappist priest Thomas Georgeon.

== In popular culture ==
The 2010 French film drama Of Gods and Men depicts the lives of the seven Trappist monks until their kidnapping.

== For further reading ==
- Georgeon, Thomas; Henning, Christophe; Akasleh, Khaled (2018) Nos vies sont déjà données! : 19 vies pour Dieu et l'Algérie : le martyre de Mgr Clavere, des moines de Tibhirine et de onze religieuses et religieux Montrouge. Bayard ISBN 978-2227492752
- Lassausse, Jean-Marie; Teissier, Henri; Georgeon, Thomas (2018) N'oublions pas Tibhirine ! : quinze ans avec les martyrs de l'Atlas Montrouge. Bayard DL ISBN 9782227492707
