= Christian de Chergé =

French Roman Catholic Cistercian monk

Blessed Christian de Chergé O.C.S.O
- Prior of the Abbey of Our Lady of Atlas
- Church: Roman Catholic Church
- Elected: 31 March 1984
- Term ended: 21 May 1996

Orders
- Ordination: 21 March 1964

Personal details
- Born: Christian de Chergé; 17 January 1937 Colmar, France
- Died: 21 May 1996 (aged 59) Médéa, Algeria
- Buried: Abbey of Our Lady of Atlas, Algeria
- Denomination: Catholic (Roman Rite)

Sainthood
- Feast day: 8 May
- Venerated in: Roman Catholic Church
- Beatified: 8 December 2018; Sanctuary of Notre-Dame de Santa Cruz, Oran, Algeria by Cardinal Giovanni Angelo Becciu
- Attributes: Trappist habit

Charles-Marie Christian de Chergé, O.C.S.O (Colmar, 18 January 1937 – 21 May 1996), was a French Cistercian, one of the seven monks kidnapped from the Abbey of Our Lady of Atlas in Tibhirine, Algeria, and believed to have been later killed by Islamists in 1996. He was beatified with eighteen others, the Martyrs of Algeria, on December 9, 2018.

== Biography ==
=== Early life ===
He was born in Colmar, Haut-Rhin, in an aristocratic military family (whose moto is Recte Semper), and he spent part of his childhood in Algiers, French Algeria, where his father was commander of the 67th Artillery Regiment of Africa. De Chergé family returned afterwards to France, settling in Paris, where he studied at the Sainte-Marie de Manceau School, from 1947 to 1954, directed by the Society of Mary, and was a Boy Scout. He was a brilliant student at Sainte-Marie, winning at the year of his graduation the first Prize of Excellency. He felt the calling to the religious life since he was 8 years old.

=== Religious life ===
He entered Carmes Seminary, in Paris, in 1956. He returned to Algeria in 1959, during the Algerian War, as a young officer. He would always remember that he had his life saved by an Algerian Muslim named Mohamed, a father of ten children, during an ambush. De Chergé told him that he would pray for him, but Mohamed answered him back: "I know that you will pray for me. But look, Christians don't know how to pray!" The next morning, he was found murdered. He never forgot this event, and later said: "In the blood of this friend, I knew that my calling to follow Christ meant to live, sooner or later, in the country where it was given to me the greatest gift of love".

He returned to France, where he was ordained a priest at the Church of Saint-Sulpice, in Paris, in 1964. He was chaplain at the Basilica of Montmartre, from 1964 to 1969. He decided to enter the Atlas Abbey, in Tibhirine, Algeria, where he arrived, after a novitiate at Aiguebelle Abbey, in 1971. He studied Arab language and culture with the White Fathers at the Pontifical Institute of Arab and Islamic Studies in Rome from 1972 to 1974. In 1984, Atlas Abbey became a simple priory. He was elected prior the same year.

=== Study of Islam and the Quran ===
De Chergé during his time at the Atlas Abbey always encouraged the Islamic-Christian dialogue. He had a deep knowledge and a great respect for Islam and the Arab and Islamic culture. He spoke several languages, including Arabic, Latin, Greek, and Hebrew. De Chérgé had a mystical night, during Ramadan, on 21 September 1975, when it took place at the monastery chapel a common prayer between a Christian and a Muslim. He never ceased to deepen that faith in the unity of the two religions during his lifetime. He studied and meditated the suras of the Quran concerning "Jesus, son of Mary", the "people of the Book", and the Christians, comparing the words and concepts of both religions, like "Mercy" and "the Merciful".

=== Ribât-al-Salam ===
He founded, with Claude Rault, of the Missionaries of Africa, who became bishop of Sahara, the group Ribât-al-Salam (The Place of Peace), who discussed the Muslim tradition and spirituality, in the Spring of 1979. In 1980, the group was joined by Sufi Muslims from the fraternity Alawya, founded by Sheikh Ahmad al-Alawi. The group had regular meetings at the monastery, representing a place for dialogue and prayer between Christians and Muslims, in mutual respect.

=== Last years, kidnapping and death ===
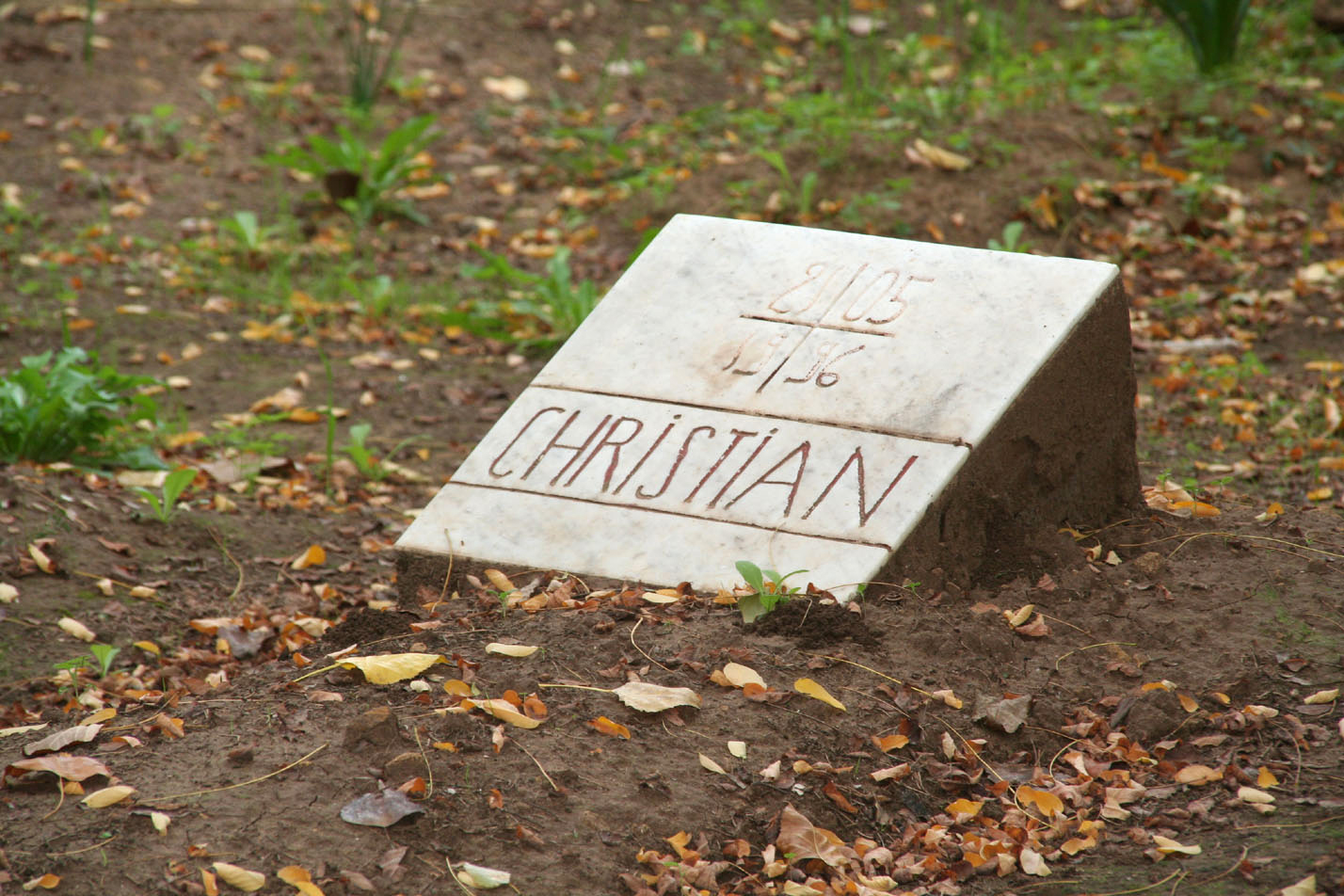
Father Christian de Chergé tomb in the Abbey of Our Lady of Atlas cemetery

In the early 1990s, Islamic fundamentalism threatened Algeria. In 1993, a group of armed men irrupted into the monastery shortly after the murder of twelve Croatians, three kilometers nearby. Dom De Chérgé had a bad feeling and decided to write his now famous testament, for two times, on 1 December 1993 and 1 January 1994. It would be published in the newspaper La Croix, shortly after his death, on 29 May 1996, and it became known as the Spiritual Testament of Christian de Chérgé.

In the night of 26 to 27 March 1996, a group of 20 armed men from the GIA entered the monastery at 1:45 AM. They took seven monks' captive, including one, Brother Bruno, who was a visitor from Fès, Morocco. Two monks escaped the kidnappers. A message signed by the GIA announced that the seven monks had been beheaded on 21 May 1996. It is still uncertain who killed them, because some sources claim that they died during an airstrike from the Algerian Air Force.

Father de Chergé and the other monks were buried in the Abbey of Our Lady of Atlas cemetery.

== Beatification process ==
The Diocese of Algiers started the process for the beatification of Christian de Chergé and the monks of Tibhirine in 1996. On 7 October 2013, the Order of the Cistercians of the Strict Observance announced that the Archbishop of Algiers, with the agreement of the Abbot General and his council, had nominated Father Thomas Georgeon, his Secretary General, as the postulator of the process of beatification of Archbishop Pierre Lucien Claverie and 18 companions, including the 7 Tibhirine monks. The Congregation for the Causes of Saints approved the appointment on 11 October 2013. The beatification took place in Oran, Algeria, on 8 December 2018. He was one of the 19 people beatified as the Martyrs of Algeria.

== Books ==
- Dieu pour Tout Jour: Chapitres de Père Christian de Chergé à la Communauté de Tibhirine (1985-1996) (2006)
- L'Autre que Nous Attendons: Homélies de Père Christian de Chergé (1970-1996) (2009)
- L'Invincible Espérance (2010), compilation of texts by Bruno Chenu.
- Lettres à Un Ami Fraternel (2015), letters to Father Maurice Borrmans (1974-1995).
