= Abbey of Our Lady of Atlas =

Trappist monastery in Tibhirine, Algeria

Abbey of Our Lady of the Atlas
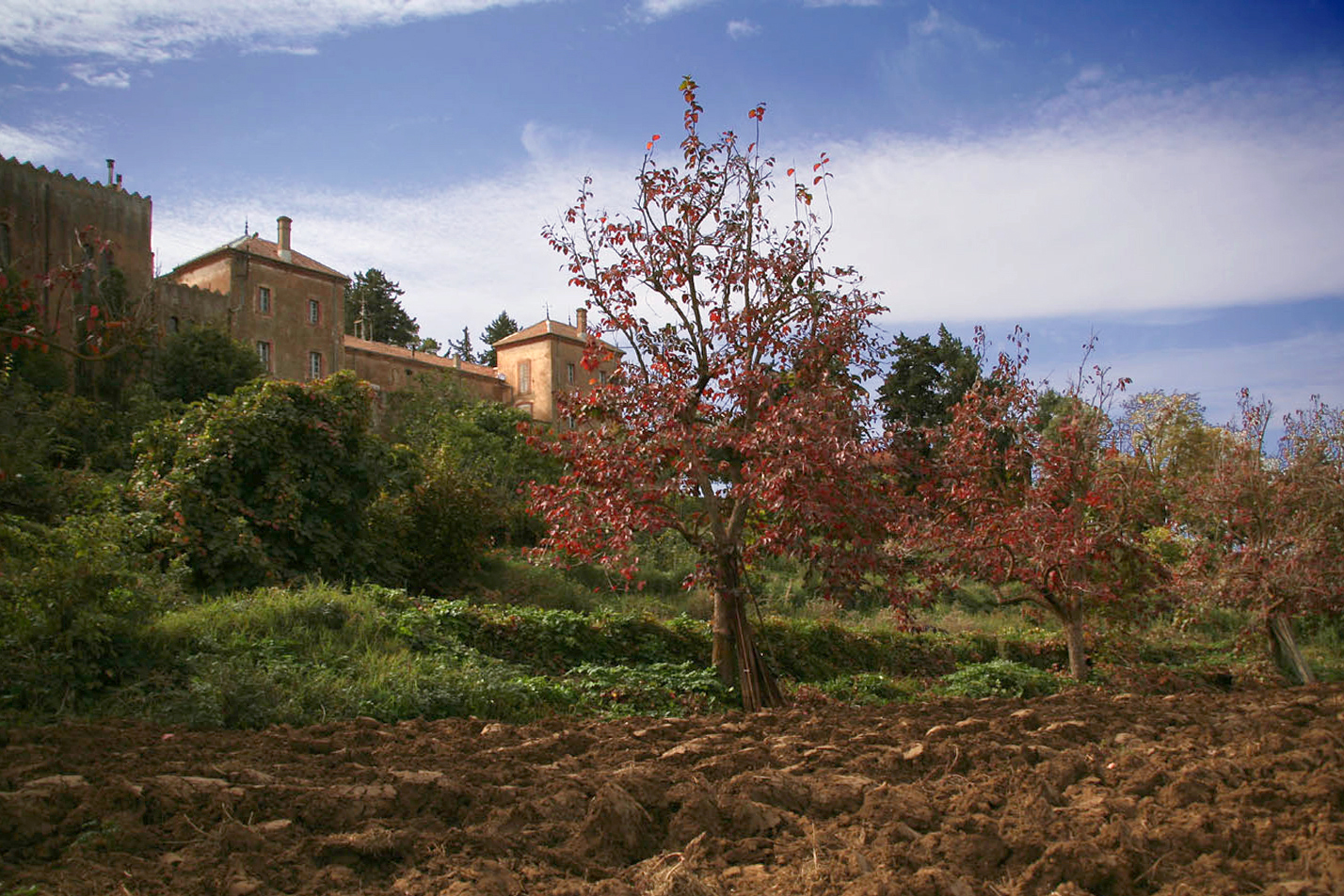
- Abbey of Our Lady of the Atlas

- Location within Algeria
- Interactive map of Abbey of Our Lady of the Atlas

Monastery information
- Order: Trappists
- Established: March 7, 1938
- Mother house: Aiguebelle Abbey
- Diocese: Archdiocese of Alger

People
- Abbot: Dom Christian de Chergé, O.C.S.O. (1996)

Site
- Country: Algeria
- Coordinates: 36.2956°N 2.7155°E

The Abbey of Our Lady of Atlas (Arabic: دير سيدة الأطلس; French: Abbaye Notre-Dame de l'Atlas) is a Catholic monastery of Trappists, inaugurated on March 7, 1938, in Tibhirine, close to Médéa, in Algeria.

The abbey became more known in 1996, when seven monks were kidnapped from the monastery, during the Algerian Civil War, and were killed. The film Of Gods and Men, released in 2010, tells the events that led to their deaths.

== History ==
=== Founding ===
In 1843, Trappist monks of Aiguebelle Abbey built the Abbaye Notre-Dame de Staouëli at Staouéli in French Algeria, in order to train the population in modern agriculture techniques. The Staoueli Abbey and its agriculture cultivation were growing quickly. But in 1904 the monks left the country because of the difficulties to make the territory profitable and for fear of the French law on associations passed in 1901, which limited the rights of religious congregations.

In 1933–34, some Trappist monks of the Deliverance of Mary Abbey, Brestanica (today Slovenia), went to Algeria. The monks reached Fort Alger with the assistance of different abbeys, notably the Abbey of Notre-Dame des Dombes and Aiguebelle Abbey. Among their number can be mentioned, Father Marcel (born in Taisey which is part of Saint Rémy, in Saône and Loire, in 1868) and Father Berchmans (Joseph Baillet) and his brother Father Benoit (Stanislas Baillet).

The community lived in a monastic refuge in Ouled-Trift, which was then transferred, in 1935, to Ben Chicao, located 20 km from Médéa and 100 km south of Algiers, in the mountain range of Atlas. In 1938, Aiguebelle Abbey became the mother abbey of this community. The monks set up the Atlas monastery, on March 7, 1938, close to the Lodi village founded by colonists in 1848, in the agriculture territory of Tib-Harins, which became Tibhirine after 1962 Tib-Harine means "Gardens" in Berber and specifically vegetable garden: this term brings to mind the "garden terraces" around the monastery, irrigated by a basin. It is an important centre in the country, with a farm, which is dominated by the Tibhirine Forest. The community numbered firstly thirteen monks including some who were already present in Staouéli.

The monastery received the status of abbey on September 26, 1947. The first abbot was Dom Bernard Barbarous, former abbot of Maguzzano: He received the abbatial blessing on October 13, with the abbatial crozier of the Abbey of Staoueli, dated from 1856. This expressed the direct link between the Abbey of Staoueli and the new Trappist abbey. During the war, the inhabitants of Tamesguida came down from the mountain for fear of unrest and settled down little by little around and under the protection of the monastery, which contributed to the development of the village of Tibhirine. The monks numbered around 30 in 1951 and about 25 a few years later, which was much less than in Staoueli.

=== 1958 to 1988 ===
In 1958, during the Algerian war, Fellaghas raided the monastery. In 1962, there were just nine monks left. After the independence of Algeria, the closing of the monastery was considered by the monks, but the death of the General Abbot of the Trappists, Dom Gabriel Sortais during the same night as the signing of the decree of the closure of the monastery, suspended the decision. Eight new brothers, from monasteries of Aiguebelle and Timadeuc arrived in 1964.

The monks followed the Rule of Saint Benedict, spending their time in silence and prayer. Prayer set the rhythm of the days of the monastery, which lived in peace with the neighbouring village. They bonded with their Muslim neighbours by teaching French, providing employment at the monastery's farm, and medicine, and clothes and shoes for the poor.

The farm and the adjacent lands to the abbey (374 hectares) were nationalized in 1976. The monks created with villagers, an agricultural cooperative to cultivate these lands together. In 1984, monks renounced the status of abbey in order to become an independent priory, and Dom Christian de Chergé was elected prior. On January 26, 1988, the Priory of Our Lady of the Atlas built a monastery annex in Fez, Morocco.

=== 1996 assassinations by terrorists ===
When the Algerian Civil War broke out, "[t]hey chose to put their lives at risk out of solidarity with the local Muslims, who had nowhere to flee." At approximately 1:15 am on 27 March 1996, about twenty armed members of the Armed Islamic Group (GIA) arrived at the monastery of Tibhirine and kidnapped seven monks, Dom Christian de Chergé, Brother Luc (born Paul Dochier), Father Christophe (Lebreton), Brother Michel (Fleury), Father Bruno (born Christian Lemarchand), Father Célestin (Ringeard), and Brother Paul (Favre-Miville). Two others, Father Jean-Pierre and Father Amédée, were in separate rooms and escaped the kidnappers' notice. After the kidnappers left, the remaining monks attempted to contact the police, but found that the telephone lines had been cut. As there was a curfew in force, they had to wait until morning to drive to the police station in Médéa.

On 18 April, the GIA's communique no. 43 announced that they would release the monks in exchange for Abdelhak Layada, a former GIA leader who had been arrested three years earlier. On 30 April, a tape with the voices of the kidnapped monks, recorded on 20 April, was delivered to the French Embassy in Algiers. On 23 May, the GIA's communique no. 44 reported that they had executed the monks on May 21. The Algerian government announced that their heads had been discovered on May 30; the whereabouts of their bodies is unknown. The funeral Mass for the monks was celebrated in the Catholic Basilica of Notre Dame d'Afrique (Our Lady of Africa) in Algiers on Sunday, 2 June 1996. They were buried in the cemetery of Tibhirine monastery two days later. The seven monks of the Our Lady of the Atlas were beatified with twelve other martyrs of Algeria as the 19 martyrs of Algeria in a mass also attended by Muslims in Oran on December 8, 2018.

=== Recent years ===
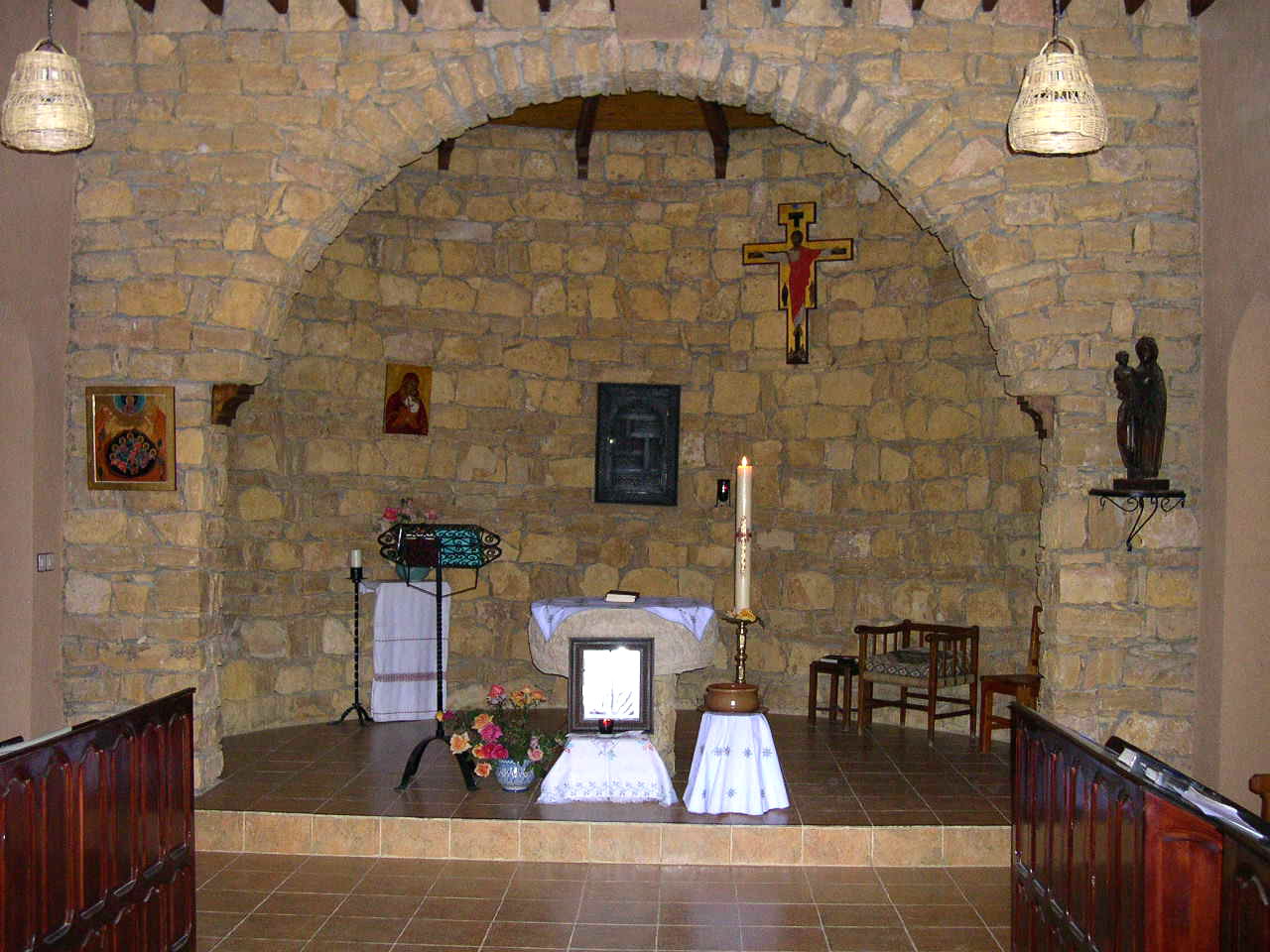
Chapel of the Priory of Our Lady of Atlas, Midelt, Morocco.

The surviving two monks of Atlas Priory, Father Jean-Pierre and Father Amédée, moved to the monastery annex in Fez, Morocco, leaving the Tibhirine location abandoned. The Abbot General of the Trappist Order, Dom Bernardo Olivera, O.C.S.O., wrote: “After the departure – which we hope is only temporary – of all the monks from Tibhirine, your community of Fez in Morocco can no longer be looked upon as a simple annex house of Tibhirine. You constitute the community of Our Lady of Atlas, and therefore are an autonomous Major Priory.”

The monks left the Fez location in March 2000 and moved into a new monastery near Midelt, Morocco, in buildings previously occupied by members of the Franciscan Missionary Sisters of the Immaculate Heart of Mary.

In 2016, the monastery buildings of Tibhirine were turned over to Chemin Neuf Community, a Catholic community originally from Lyon, France.

== List of abbots and priors ==
Atlas Abbey was a priory until 1947 when it became an abbey, and then returned to being a priory from 1984 until its abandonment in 1996.

Abbots

1. Dom Bernard Barbarous, O.C.S.O. (1947–?)

Priors

1. Dom Christian de Chergé, O.C.S.O. (1984–1996)
2. Dom Jean-Pierre II, O.C.S.O. (2006)
