= Late years of Pope Pius XII =

The late years of the pontificate of Pope Pius XII were characterized by a hesitancy in personnel decisions. After a major illness in 1954, he redirected his energies from Vatican clergy to the concerns of lay people.

== Pope Pius XII and appointments ==
=== Roman Curia ===
In the last years of his pontificate, while open to all the faithful and visitors to Rome, Pius was viewed as limiting contacts with Vatican clergy and representatives of the Roman Curia. Pope Pius procrastinated personnel decisions, but also found it increasingly difficult to chastise subordinates and appointees. Domenico Tardini provides an insight: Pope Pius received a monsignor whose work performance left much to be desired. Upon leaving the Papal rooms, Tardini asked the monsignor how it went. "The Holy Father is so happy with my work." Tardini interrupted him, "But the Holy Father told me …." "Yes" was the answer, "he told me that too, but he is happy with me overall." He attempted to avoid unnecessary contacts with the clergy, because of their constant demands for recognition and positions.

- "Today I will receive a group of priests. Who knows, how many requests they will have.” I told him, "Your Holiness, just say no." “Okay”, said the Pope, ”I say no, but then they press and press and press.” A sign of resignation followed.

During the last years of the pontificate, vacant Vatican positions were not always filled. ”The Roman Curia experienced certain stagnation.” In his last years, it was difficult for Pius to make decisions regarding the promotion of Curia priests. Domenico Tardini gave a significant insight, Pius' huge concern about appointments.

- The higher the honour was to be, the more difficult and more desired were the positions. It is well known, that for such occasions there is no shortage of candidates, even applicants, including those who claim to have capacities which they are not always in possession of. They measure their value by the extent of their aspirations, calling on “rights”, which simply do not exist. It may even happen that such non-virtuous aspirations find cover and support in lavish red silk coats of some Cardinals. Pius suffered under all this, being subjected to contrary proposals and recommendations. His inclination to fulfill wishes and agree spontaneously and his conscientiousness contradicted within him. Thus, the Pope did not like to make personnel changes and preferred to procrastinate.

The seeming inability to talk to appointees about their performance, extended also to his one-time physician, Riccardo Galeazzi-Lisi. He was finally dismissed by the Pope in 1956, but gained admittance in October 1958 as the Pope lay dying and took photographs of Pius which he sold to Paris Match, forcing him to resign as chief physician of the Vatican ("pontifical archiater") in the wake of massive public protests. When Pius died, Galeazzi-Lisi assumed the role of Pius' embalmer, using controversial methods.

The pastoral needs of the Church were not affected by his procrastination on Vatican positions. New bishops were appointed whenever necessary. Pope Pius XII favoured naming unconventional, often young priests, such as Julius Döpfner (35 years) and Karol Wojtyla (38 years), one of his last appointees in 1958.

=== Stories and rumours ===
Robert Leiber reports that during the life of Pope Pius XII, fabrications were published about his personal life such as his allegedly austere life, sleeping on a bare iron bed and being attended to by four German Capuchin monks at six a.m. every morning with a single cup of black coffee. Horror stories continued after the death of Pius XII, a number of them originating in Cornwell’s Hitler’s Pope published in 1999, such as the allegation that the papal nose was falling off, and collapsing Vatican guards.

=== Worker-priests ===
Controversy caused the Vatican position on French worker-priests. In 1941, worker-priest Dominican Father Jacques Loew began a new priestly mission by working as a priest in the docks at Marseille, France. Some followed him. Originally, a dedicated idealistic group, they soon split, some of them joined political parties and unions, others left the priesthood altogether. Conflicts with the Vatican developed after some worker-priests advocated a close association between Marxism and Catholicism, as American sympathizer Dorothy Day freely admitted. Some like Jacques Loew were able to combine personal piety and spirituality with a full engagement in factory work. The French bishops were divided. The Vatican was divided too, with Monsignor Giovanni Battista Montini, later Pope Paul VI, allegedly in favour. Against considerable opposition of French bishops, Pope Pius decided to stop the experiment. Priests were to work in rectories not in factories. Allowed to work for three hours factory work, they were prohibited from joining unions and had to live in rectories or religious communities. Pope John XXIII continued and even sharpened the decision of his predecessor in 1959 by withdrawing the three-hour work permit completely.

To Pius, a clear separation of priestly duties and the role of lay people was essential. This position mirrored his earlier insistence that Catholic priests should not be in politics. Loew bowed to the Vatican, and in 1971 Pope Paul VI invited him to preach the Lenten retreat in the Vatican. Earlier in 1965, he attempted to resurrect the French worker-priest experiment but without much success.

=== Theologians ===
Theologians began to create problems from both ends of the philosophical spectrum. On the ultra-conservative end was American Jesuit Leonard Feeney, who taught that Protestants and other non-Catholics are on their way to hell, because extra ecclesiam nulla salus: there is no salvation outside of the Church. This old teaching was undergoing development. Feeney overlooked that aspect and was not only silenced, he was excommunicated under Pope Pius XII for his outdated interpretation of Catholic doctrine.

In Europe, Catholic theology tried to go different roads, which did not all lead to Rome. History was rediscovered, including the history of dogma, opening the door to theological relativism. The Cardinal of Paris, Suhard, questioned whether the historically conditioned theological language of Thomas Aquinas is really the only permitted form of expressing one truth. Pope Pius XII, first in 1950 in Humani generis, warned against adopting of philosophies which today are modern, tomorrow hopelessly old-fashioned. Defending traditional Thomism, Pope Pius asked for its reform and further improvement rather than rejection, which would lead to positivism and relativism in theology. In the following years, the Sacred Congregation began to review critical theologians, issuing condemnations or threats of condemnation, which generated within the Church a sense of narrowness and distrust. Mainly French and German theologians were affected. Theologians like Henri de Lubac, Yves Congar and Karl Rahner were reprimanded or temporarily silenced. Pius was not personally involved in this development, and may have tried to change course; in his last speech to honour Pope Benedict XIV, to be delivered to the Roman Curia in October 1958, he was to announce a revision of the review processes of the Church, increasing the rights of individuals and protecting them from secret investigations. Several years later, this reform was carried out by his successors.

== Pope Pius XII and lay people ==
=== Encouragement of lay people ===
In his last years, Pope Pius devoted most of his energies to meetings with lay people and addressed their problems in an unprecedented range of topics to large and small organizations, in which he confronted the big questions of the time in light of their specific concerns or orientation. This was based on his theology of the Mystical Body of Christ, "Lay people not only belong to the Church, they are the Church." "Therefore they must turn the world from a wilderness to a humanistic and from a humanistic to a divine world, reflecting the Heart of God."

- The roots of today’s problem are not bad intentions but laxness of spirit, limpness of will, and coldness of heart: the tiredness of all the good people. Following the encyclical, the call to all Christians is theologically based on their guidance through the Holy Spirit and their participation in the redemptive works of Jesus Christ. The Church can only be effective in a modern society if lay people from their position actively participate at all levels: parish, community, society and international relations

Pope Pius XII spoke to members of scientific congresses, explaining Christian teachings in light of most recent scientific results. Sometimes he answered specific moral questions which were addressed to him. To professional associations he explained specific occupational ethics in light of Church teachings. During the last three months of his pontificate, Pius XII gave the following thirty addresses:

- The message of Lourdes to blue collar workers – International pilgrimage of Catholic blue collar workers to Lourdes, July 21, 1958
- The Contemplative Life – Radio audience for members of contemplative convents throughout the World, July 26, 1958
- Problems and Ideals in the health sector – International Catholic Health Conference, Brussels, Belgium, July 27, 1958
- The meaning of biblical studies – International biblical congress, Brussels, Belgium, July 28, 1958
- The Contemplative Life, Part Three – Radio audience for members of contemplative convents throughout the World, August 2, 1958
- Classical antiquity as an educational force for Christianity – International Congress for Classical Archaeology, August 7, 1958
- Christian academicians forming a Christian world? – World Congress of Pax Romana in Vienna, Austria, August 11, 1958
- The family as centre of sanctification – Families from Spain, August 12, 1958
- Purposes of the World Exhibition in Brussels, Message to World Exhibition in Brussels – August 15, 1958, French
- The unity of life and religious life – Exhortation to German Catholics meeting in Berlin August 17, 1958, German
- The Third Order of St. Dominic Today – International congress of The Third Order of St. Dominic, August 20, 1958, French
- The relevance of blood group genetics for society – International Society for blood transfusions, September 5, 1958, French
- The importance of legal employees – Third International Congress of Legal Employees, September 8, 1958, French
- Psychopharmaca and related treatments in light of Christian Morality – Collegium Internationale Neuro-Psycho-Pharmacologicum, Rome, September 9, 1958, French
- Christian love a basis for organized aid – Pilgrimage of Spanish insurance agents, September 11, 1958|, Spanish
- Hereditary problems and Christian conscience – International conference of haematology, September 12, 1958, French
- Purpose of Catholic schools – General meeting of Catholic educators, September 14, 1958, French
- The message of the Virgin Mary today – International Marian Congress, Lourdes, September 17, 1958, French
- Philosophy and Christian faith – International Congress of Philosophy, Venice and Padua September 18, 1958, Italian
- The wonderful world of bees, usefulness and value for human life – International Congress of Bee Keepers, September 22, 1958, French
- The formation of Priests in our time – Rectors of Latin American seminaries, September 23, 1958, Spanish
- The ideals of Christian life – Eucharistic congress in Ecuador, September 28, 1958, Spanish
- Accident avoidance as a moral problem – International Association of Natural Gas Industries, September 28, 1958, French
- Call for a renewal of Christian life – Opening of the restored Cathedral in Reims, France, September 29, 1958, Latin
- Ethical considerations for book stores in train terminals – Owners of train station book stores, October 2, 1958, Italian
- Thinking about our guardian angels in October – American Pilgrims with Francis Cardinal Spellman, October 3, 1958, English
- Problems and perspectives concerning plastic surgery – Congress, Italian Society for Plastic Surgery, October 4, 1958, Italian
- Obligations of notaries in our time, International Congress – October 5, 1958, French
- The personality and magisterium of Pope Benedict XIV – Pope Pius XII died October 9, 1958, before he could deliver this address for the 200th anniversary of the death of Pope Benedict XIV, Italian
- Preparing yourself for the priesthood – To be issued October 19, 1958, this message was read to the students as a testament of the late Pope; students of the theological seminary in Apulia, Italy, Italian

=== Call to a Holy Life ===
Pope Pius took strong stands against hedonism, which in his view had influenced many faithful, and called for a return to a heroic virtuous life which means a renunciation of average mediocrity. As a norm, all Christians are called to perfection. With their sacrifices and suffering, they must continue and complete the sufferings of Christ, as Mystici corporis Christi, and thus participate in the great mystery of salvation. The Church needs saints in today’s world, especially among the lay people. The Holy Eucharist with Christ in God should be the centre of life.

The worldwide monthly prayer requests of Pope Pius XII allowed lay people to participate in the pastoral concerns of the Holy Father through the Apostleship of Prayer. These prayers reflected his real concerns and created a universal prayerful community. They reflected again Mystici corporis that all Catholics are true and full members of the Church. A fervent call to heroic life was promulgated to the Sodalities of Mary, whose vows included such efforts towards the perfect Christian life.

Pope Pius XII wanted the life of priests to be a mirror of Christ’s love. The Cross is the tool of salvation and not a flight into social action. He warned of mistaken tributes to contemporary thinking. Instead, the priest must communicate Jesus Christ as living reality and enunciate clear goals of sanctity. He explained his high appreciation of voluntary virginity for the sake of Christ in terms of apostolic zeal and contemplative prayer.

== Sources ==
- Acta Apostolicae Sedis. (AAS), Vatican City 1939-1958. Official documents of the Pontificate of Pope Pius XII
- Robert Leiber, Papst Pius XII, Herbert Schambeck, in Pius XII, Butzon & Bercker, 1986
- Pascalina Lehnert, Ich durfte Ihm Dienen, Erinnerungen an Papst Pius XII. Naumann, Würzburg, 1986
- Pio XII, Discorsi e Radio Messaggi di Sua Santita Pio XII, Vatican City 1939-1958, Official speeches of Pius XII, 20 vol.
- Pio XII, Discorsi Ai Medici collected byFiorenzo Angelini, Roma, 1959, 725 pages
- Soziale Summe Pius XII ed.A.F.Utz, J.F.Gröner, 4010 pages. in German, the non-theological teachings 1939-1958, 3 vol.
- Martha Schad, Gottes Mächtige Dienerin, Schwester Pascalina und Papst Pius XII. Herbig, München, 2007
- Burkhard Schneider, Pius XII, Würzburg, 1974
- Domenico Cardinale Tardini, Pio XII, Tipografia Poliglotta Vaticana, 1960

== Quotes ==
.
