= Jacques Loew =

French Catholic priest (1908–1999)

Jacques Loew OP
- Loew in his Dominican habit

Personal life
- Born: 31 August 1908 Clermont-Ferrand, France
- Died: 14 February 1999 (aged 90) (Note: The Independent erroneously reports the date of death as 13 February; other sources uniformly report 14 February.) Échourgnac, France
- Known for: Worker-priest movement

Religious life
- Religion: Catholic Church
- Order: Order of Preachers
- Ordination: 1939

Jacques Loew OP (31 August 1908 – 14 February 1999) was a French Dominican friar and priest, who founded both the Mission ouvrière Saints-Pierre-et-Paul and – with René Voillaume – the School of the Faith in Fribourg, Switzerland. He is best known for starting the worker-priest movement.

== Biography ==
Jacques Loew was born in 1908 in Clermont-Ferrand, the only child of August Pierre Loew, a medical doctor, and Jeanne Maximilienne (née Gerber). The family comprised middle-class socialists and Dreyfusards with anti-clerical sentiments. Loew grew up in Nice and, although he was baptized Catholic, he attended Protestant Sunday school. He later studied law and political science in Paris, before finishing his schooling at the Sanatorium Universitaire in Leysin, Switzerland, due to a case of tuberculosis. When his schooling was complete, he registered with the bar in Nice, but his nascent law career was disrupted by another bout of tuberculosis. Returning to the sanatorium in Leysin for medical treatment, he converted to Catholicism at 24 after reading the Gospel. Prior to his official reception into the Catholic Church, he traveled to La Valsainte, a Carthusian monastery in Gruyère, Switzerland, where he was particularly impressed by the dom, Jean-Baptiste Porion, who further solidified his conversion and encouraged him to meet Stanislas Fumet and his wife, Ainouta, who encouraged him further. He was fully received into the Catholic Church in October 1932, with the Fumets serving as his sponsors.

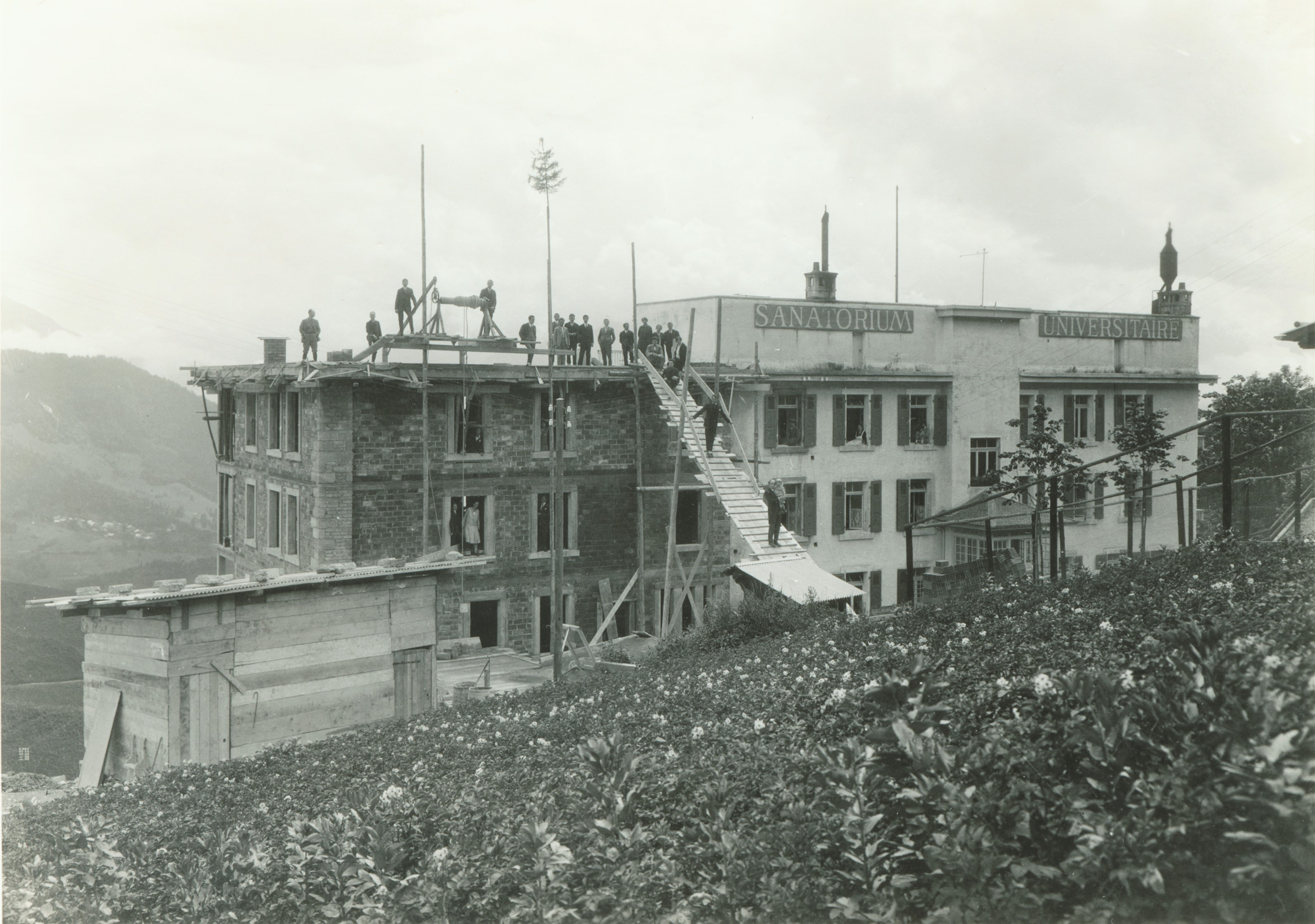
The sanatorium in Leysin in 1927, about five years before Loew converted to Catholicism there

In 1934, Loew joined the Dominican Order, becoming a friar in 1935 before being ordained a priest in 1939. Soon after, he began working alongside Louis-Joseph Lebret with the Economie et Humanisme group in Lyon, as one of its founders. Lebret instructed him to learn about the working class and study its condition in order to better be able to minister to it, particularly to the French secularized working class. In 1941, he began to work in Marseille as a longshoreman, which gave him a lasting impression about the distance between working people and the priesthood. Between 1942 and 1944, Loew and about ten priests established the Popular Family Movement (Mouvement populaire des familles; MPF) and four of them requested the Bishop of Marseille, Jean Delay, authorize them to begin evangelizing "in the framework of a missionary parish". In November 1945, Delay entrusted the parish of Saint-Louis, a working-class neighborhood in northern Marseille, to two diocesans – Jean Gentile and Georges Hallauer – and two Dominican religious – Loew and André Piet. The presence of factories and communists as well as its proximity to the docks and the absence of any strong religious communities made it appeal to the worker-priest missionaries.

In 1947, Loew was entrusted with the parish at La Cabucelle and later the one at Port-de-Bouc, which contained several secular priests who were sympathetic to Loew's views on labor. Loew eventually advocated that some priests should work in labor, such as car factories, in order to better understand the everyday lives of their flocks. In 1947, Karol Wojtyła – who later became Pope John Paul II – visited Loew in Marseille and was impressed by the work, writing afterward: "Father Loew came to the conclusion that the [Dominican] white habit by itself does not say anything any more today [...] Living among workers he decided to become one of them."

Wojtyła considered the work to be "apostolic" and the only correct way for the Church in France to reach non-believers. As the worker-priest movement took on a greater role in left-wing politics – Loew had at one point briefly joined the General Confederation of Labour – the Vatican became concerned that the role of priest was being subordinated to the role of worker. In 1951, Loew sent a long defense of the movement to Giovanni Montini, then-assistant secretary of state for the Vatican who would later become Pope Paul VI. Despite Loew's defense, the worker-priests in Marseille were ordered to stop work in the summer of 1953 and Pope Pius XII formally condemned the movement in 1954. Loew resigned his labor work and continued his priestly duties, though he continued to defend the idea of priests in labor, writing that "[o]f course a priest can belong to a trade union. This does not mean selling out your priesthood."

Later, Loew continued his ministry, establishing the Mission ouvrière Saints-Pierre-et-Paul in Aix-en-Provence in 1955, serving as superior general until 1973. After the mission's foundation, he went to Africa, later moving to São Paulo in 1963. The intensity of the mission's work – which was managing operations in France, the Sahara, Canada, Italy, Switzerland, and Japan – caused Loew to leave the Dominican Order in order to devote himself wholly to the mission's cause. In 1965, Paul VI recognized the mission as an apostolic institute, commenting that he wished "this new foundation, which flows from the love of Christ the worker, grows and makes the love of the Father shine".

In 1969, he moved to Fribourg, Switzerland, where he and René Voillaume established the School of the Faith, which served as an educational institution for educators. Loew remained the director until his retirement in 1981. In 1971, Paul VI invited Loew to preach the Lenten retreat at the Vatican.

In his old age, Loew retired to monastic life, living in religious houses at the Cîteaux and Tamié abbeys beginning in 1981 and 1986, respectively, followed by two and a half years living as a chaplain to the nuns at the hermitage at L'Albère in the Pyrenees. In 1991, he settled in a community of Trappist nuns at the Notre-Dame de Bonne-Espérance Abbey in Échourgnac where he eventually died in 1999.

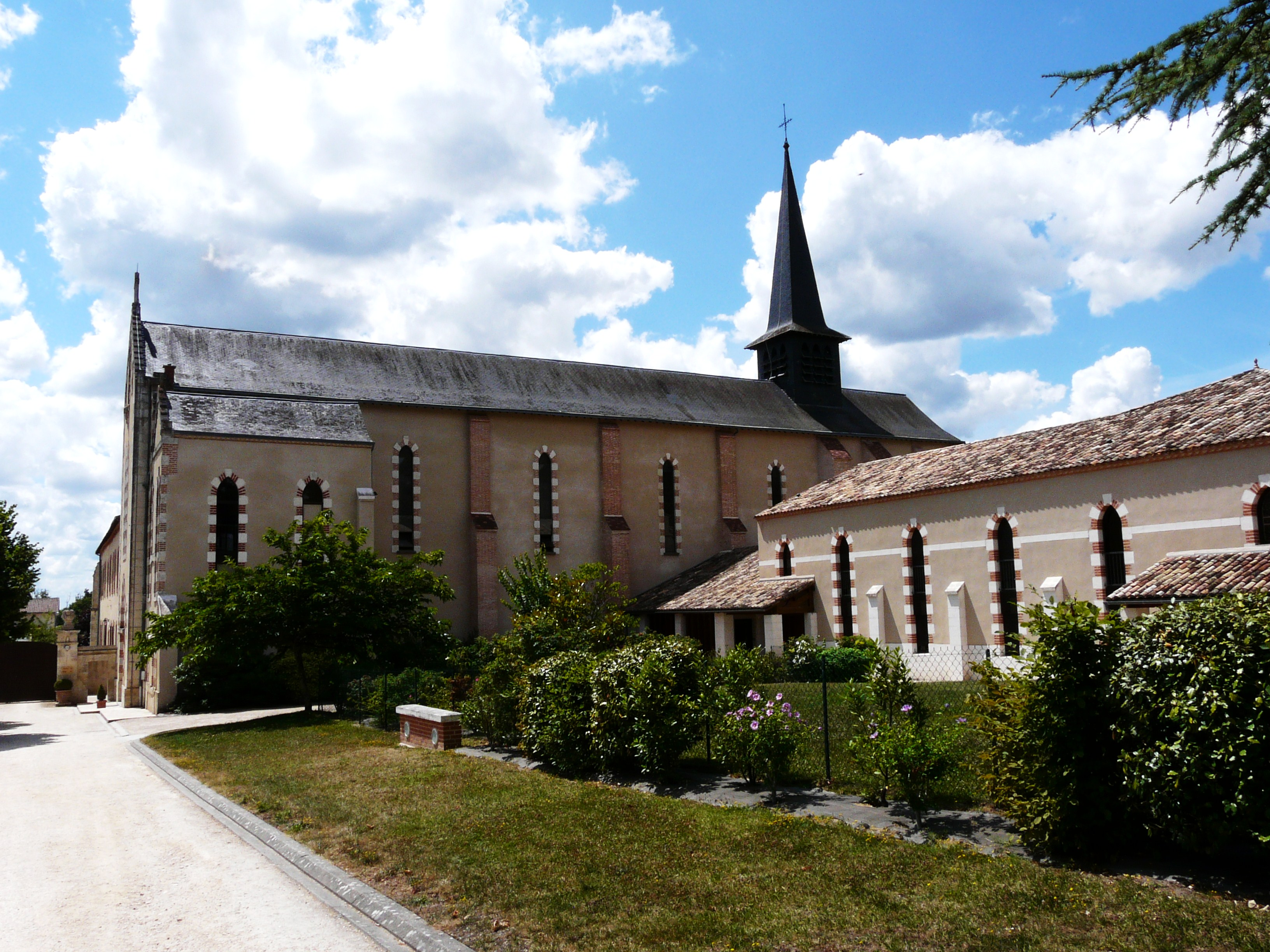
The Trappistine nunnery where Loew spent the last years of his life

In 2006, the School of the Faith was dissolved and converted into the Jacques Loew International Foundation which is a French-language biblical scholarship group operating in Curitiba, Brazil; Yamoussoukro, Côte d'Ivoire; Wrocław, Poland; and Fribourg.

== Works ==
- Les dockers de Marseille ('The Longshoremen of Marseille', 1944)
- En mission proletarienne ('On Proletarian Mission', 1946)
- Si vous saviez le don de Dieu ('If You Knew the Gift of God', 1958)
- Journal d'une mission ouvrière ('Journal of One Worker's Mission', 1959)
- Dynamisme de la foi et incroyance ('Dynamism of Faith and Unbelief', co-authored with Georges Cottier, 1963)
- Comme s'il voyait l'invisible: Un portrait de l'apôtre d'aujourd'hui ('As If He Saw the Invisible: A Portrait of the Modern-Day Apostle', 1964) (Note: Two subtitles exist for this book: Un portrait de l'apôtre d'aujourd'hui ('A Portrait of the Modern-Day Apostle') and Être apôtre à l'école de saint Paul ('Being an Apostle in the School of St. Paul'))
- Dans la nuit, j'ai cherché ('In the Night, I Sought', 1969)
- La Flamme qui dévore le berger: pour une spiritualité de l'évangélisation ('The Flame That Devours the Shepherd: For a Spirituality of Evangelizing', 1969)
- À temps et à contretemps: Retrouver dans l'Église le visage de Jésus-Christ ('On Time and Off Beat: Rediscovering the Face of Jesus Christ in the Church', co-authored with Yves Congar and René Voillaume, 1969) (Note: Each author wrote one part of the book; Congar wrote the first part (Autorité et liberté dans l'Église, 'Authority and Liberty in the Church'), Voillaume the second (Les conditions d'une saine rénovation, 'The Conditions of a Healthy Renewal'), and Loew the third (Être hantés par Jésus-Christ, 'Being Haunted by Jesus Christ').)
- Ce Jésus qu'on appelle Christ: Retraite au Vatican en 1970 ('This Jesus We Call Christ: Retreat to the Vatican in 1970', 1970)
- Les Cieux ouverts: chronique de la mission Saints Pierre et Paul ('The Open Skies: A Chronicle of the Sts. Peter and Paul Mission', 1971)
- La prière à l'école des grands priants ('Prayer at the School of Great Praying', 1975)
- Face to Face with God: the Bible's Way to Prayer (in English, 1977)
- Vous serez mes disciples: Annonciateurs de l'Évangile, réflexions et réflexes ('You Will Be My Disciples: Announcers of the Gospel, Reflections and Reflexes', 1978)
- Paraboles et Fariboles ('Parables and Nonsense', co-authored with Jacques Faizant, 1978)
- Histoire de l'Église par elle-même ('History of the Church Herself', co-authored with Michel Meslin, 1978)
- Parole de Dieu: Langage humain et communautés chrétiennes ('Word of God: Human Language and Christian Communities', co-authored with Pierre Grelot, 1980)
- Mon Dieu dont je suis sûr ('My God of Which I Am Certain', 1983) (Note: Published in two parts: Part I and Part II)
- La vie à l'écoute des grands priants ('The Life of Listening to Great Prayers', 1986)
- Le bonheur d'être homme ('The Joy of Being Human', co-authored with Dominique Xardel, 1988)
- Jésus, où te chercher? ('Jesus, Where to Find Thee?', 1992)
- Vivre l'Évangile avec Madeleine Delbrêl ('Living the Gospel with Madeleine Delbrêl', 1994)
