= Holy Cross Church (Holzhausen) =

- Heilig-Kreuz Kirche
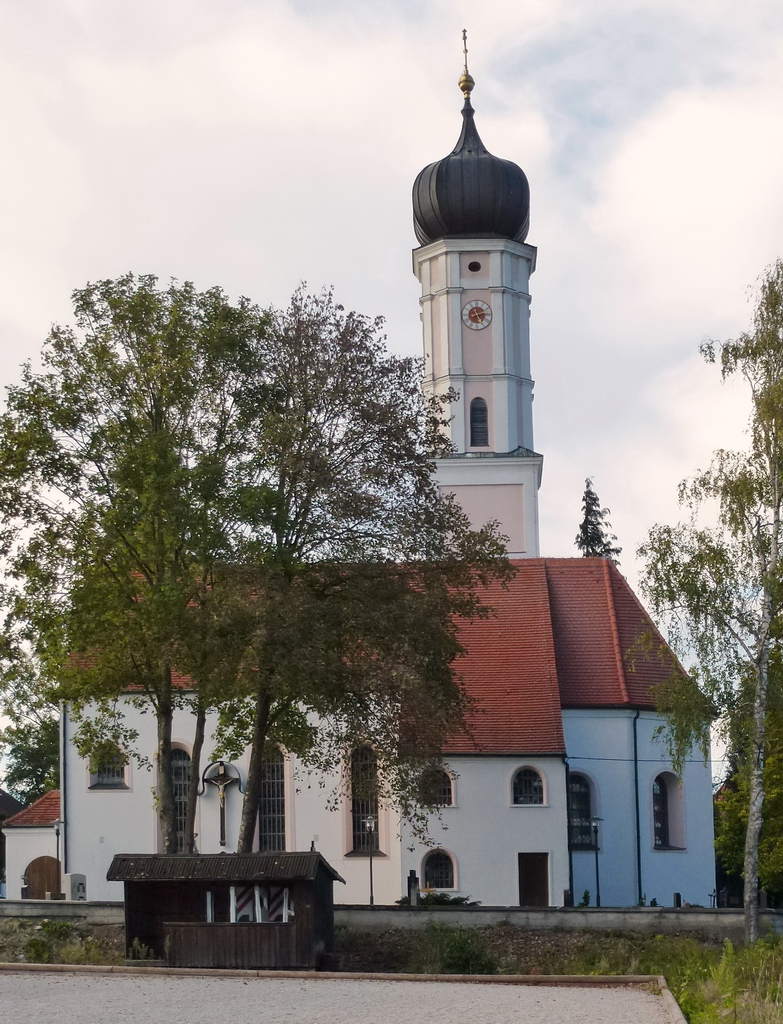
- Side view of the Holy Cross Church in 2014
- Holy Cross Church
- 48°8′19.3″N 11°14′03.3″E
- Location: Holzhausen, Alling, Fürstenfeldbruck (district), Bavaria, Germany
- Address: 82239 Alling, Germany
- Denomination: Roman Catholic

Architecture
- Heritage designation: Protected Architectural Monument in Bavaria
- Style: Late Gothic, Baroque
- Years built: Around 1400, renovated heavily in 17th century

The Holy Cross Church of Holzhausen, Alling is a Roman Catholic church in Upper Bavaria. The church, first built in the thirteenth century in the Late Gothic style, was heavily redone in the Baroque style towards the end of the seventeenth century. The church is dedicated to the Holy Cross of Christ, the cross that Jesus Christ was crucified on.

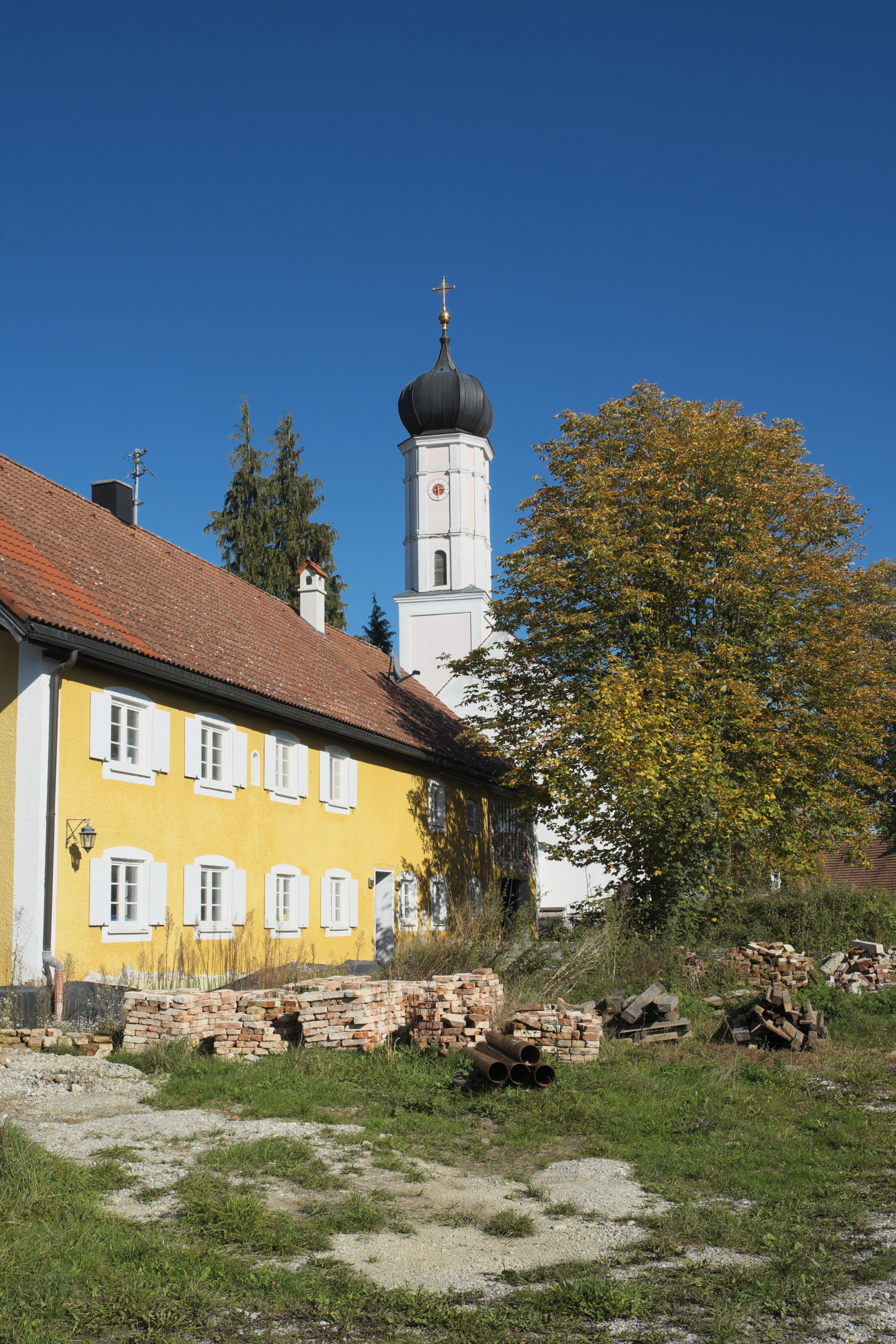
An exterior view of the church from 2018

== History ==
Records of a church in Holzhausen date back to around 770, when Bishop Arbeo of Freising consecrated it. However, the Holy Cross Church was not built until around 1400. Little is known about the church before 1650 because many of its records were destroyed in the Thirty Years' War. According to one story, a man gave a large amount of property― the land the church is now built on— to the parish after his wife's death.

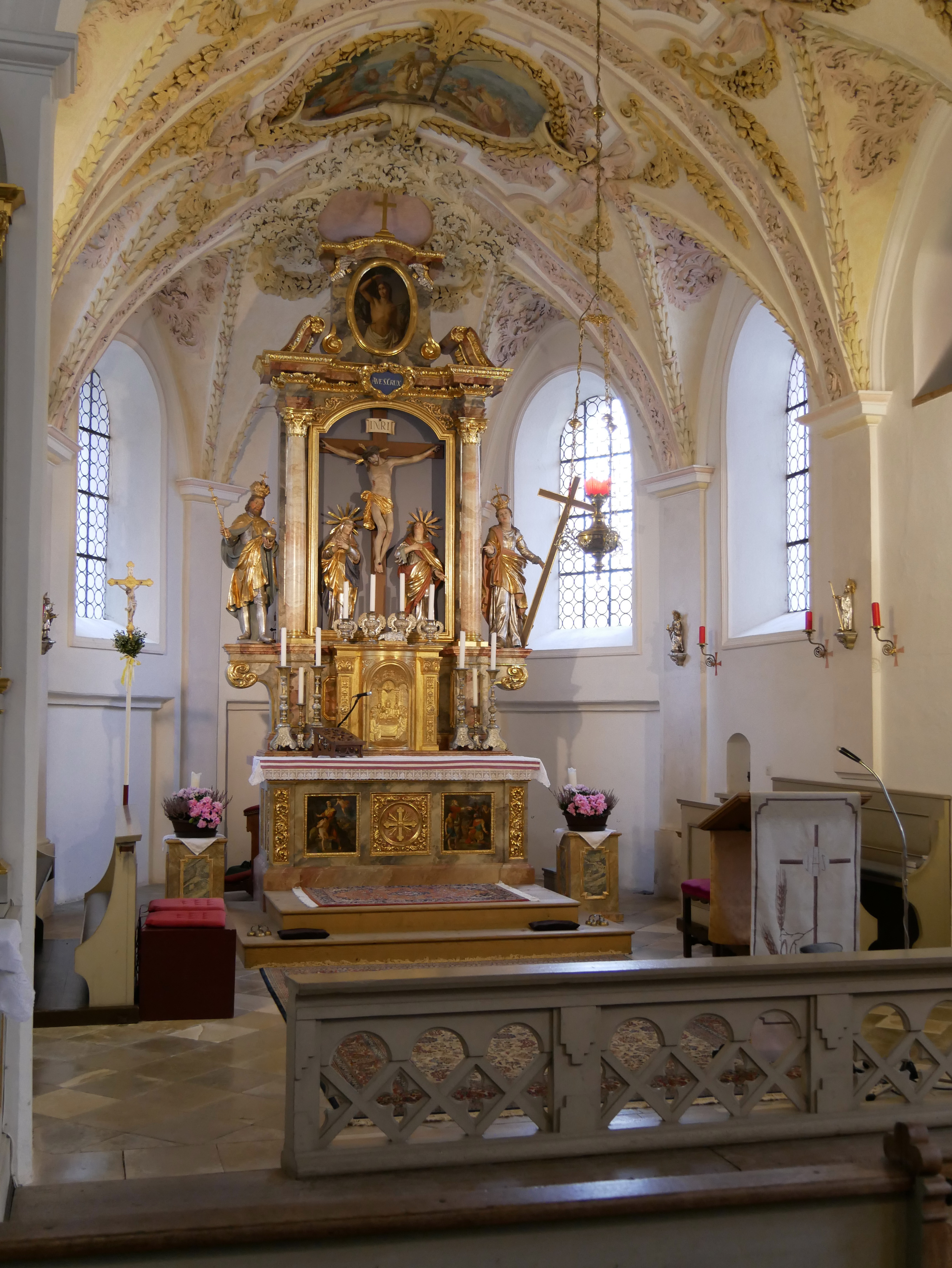
The high altar and apse of the church in 2018

The church's interior was heavily renovated in the 1690s, with almost all aspects being considerably reworked in the Baroque style. The church received its tower in 1727–28, and saw retouching work in the 1830s.

In 1997, a third bell was added to the church after over fifty years. Two of the three original church bells cast by Bernhard Ernst during renovations in the 1660s had been melted down in WWII.

== Architecture ==
=== Altars ===
The high altar is of Baroque design and features a large crucifix in the middle of two stipes, or columns, between statues of The Blessed Virgin Mary and Saint John observing Christ's agony. Beyond the columns are statues of Saint Constantine and Saint Helena his mother, who both played significant roles in the history of the Holy Cross; according to legend, Saint Helena was the one who discovered the true cross, and Saint Constantine saw great success in a battle following a vision from God to paint crosses on his soldier's shields.

The church also has two additional side altars facing north and south, depicting the Nativity of Jesus and the Descent from the Cross respectively.

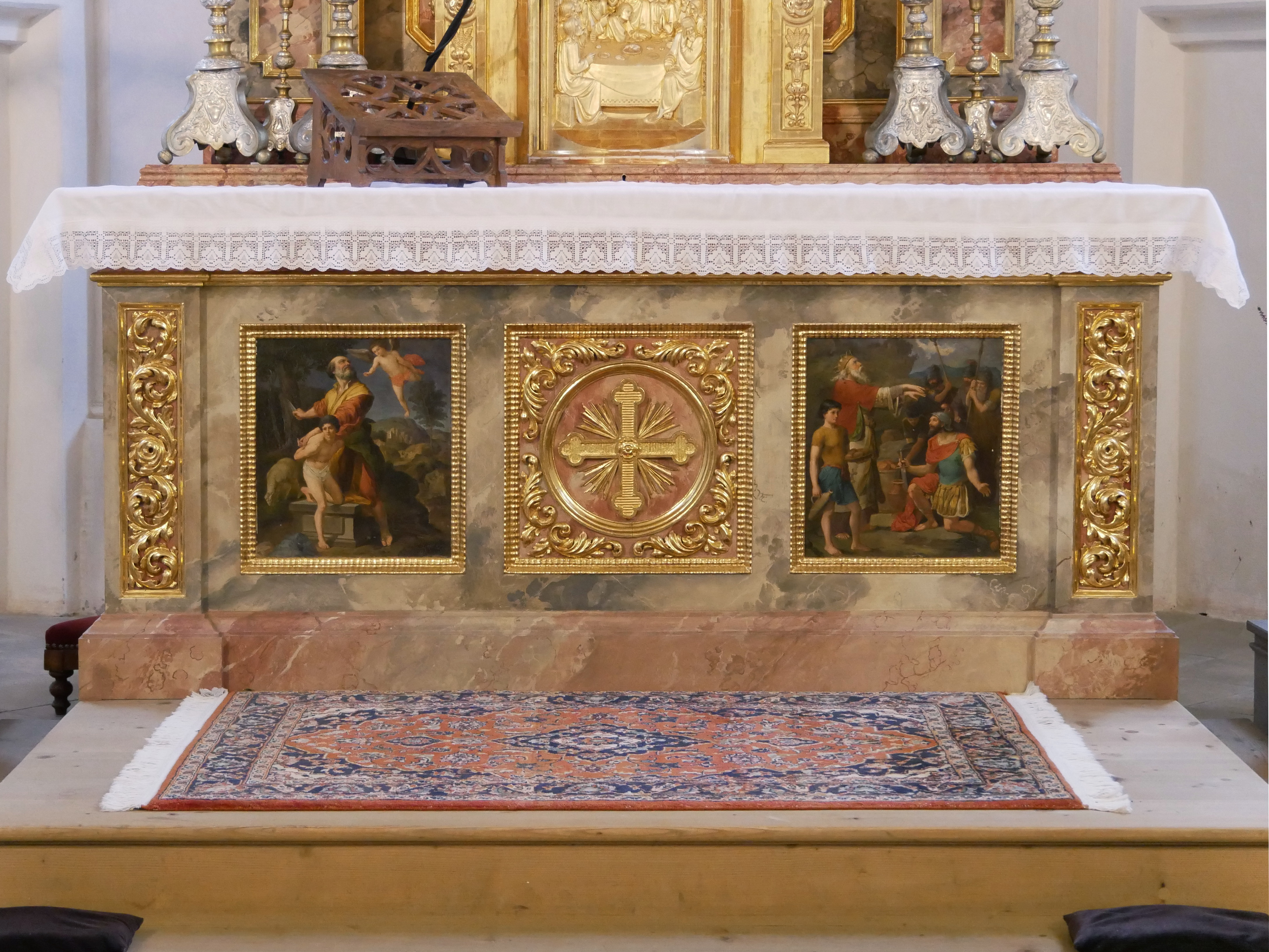
The base of the high altar, featuring a Greek cross flanked by scenes of The Binding of Isaac and Melchizedek blessing Abraham

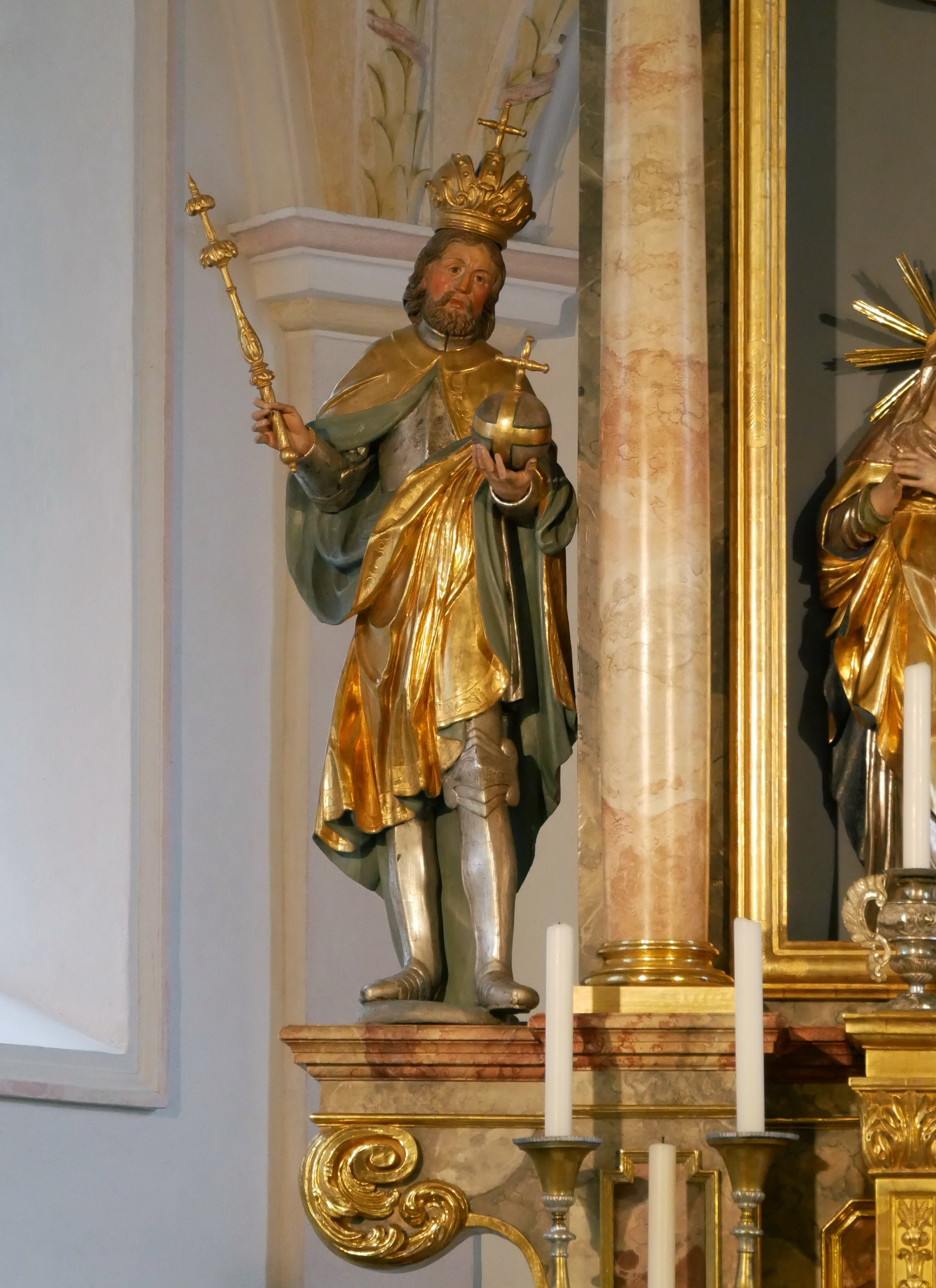
Constantine holding an orb and sceptre

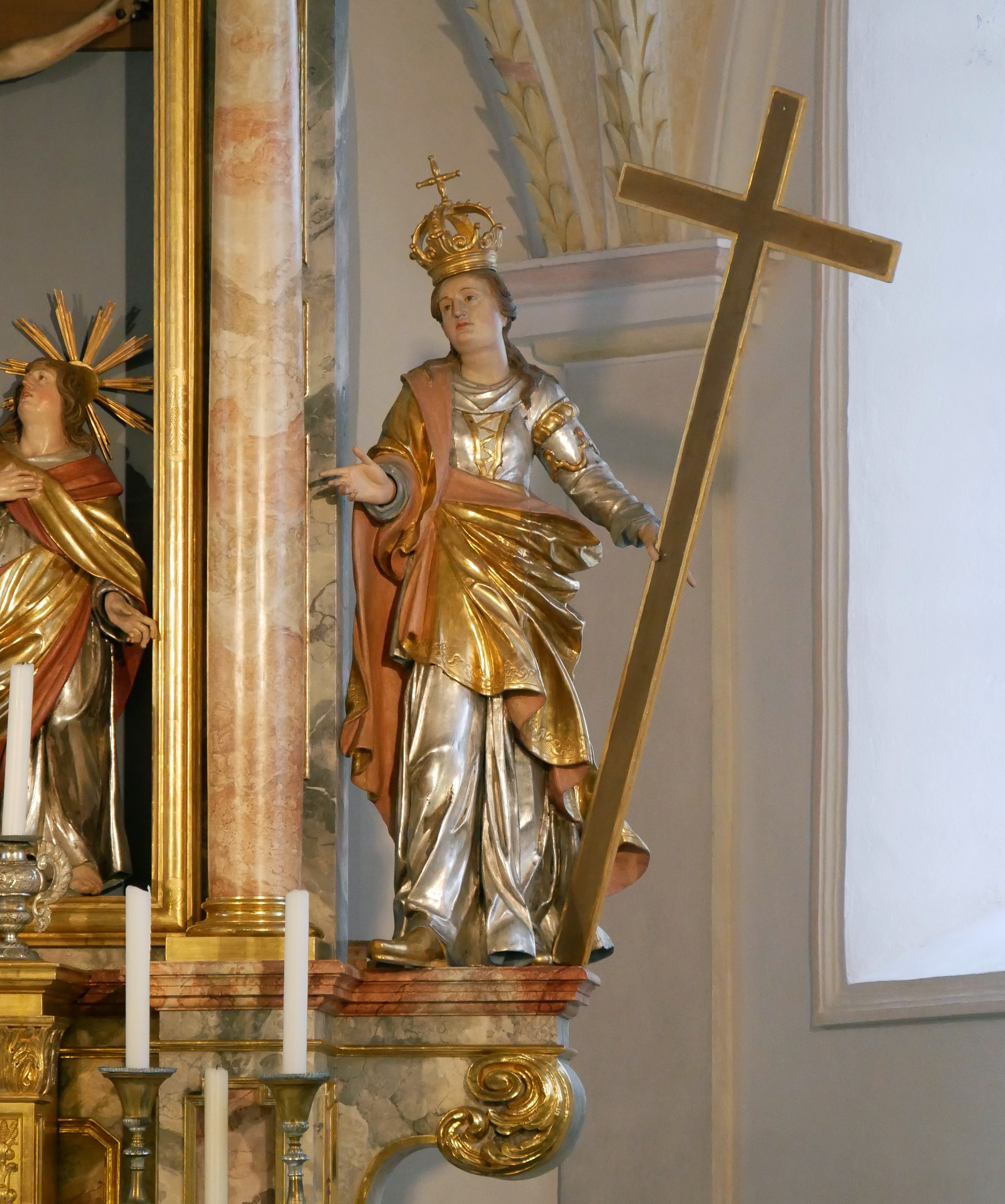
Saint Helena bearing the True Cross

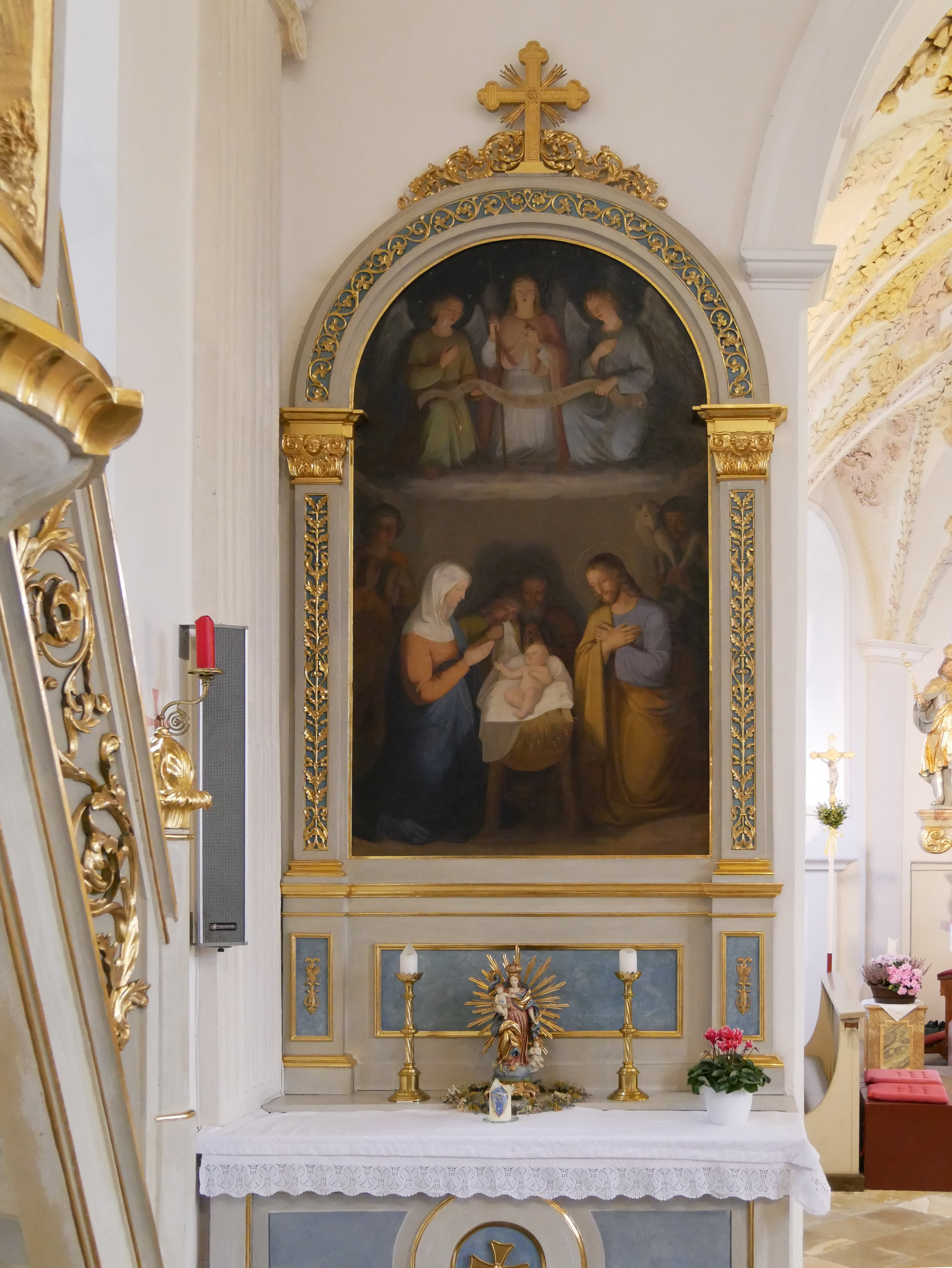
Northern (left) side altar, depicting the Nativity of Jesus

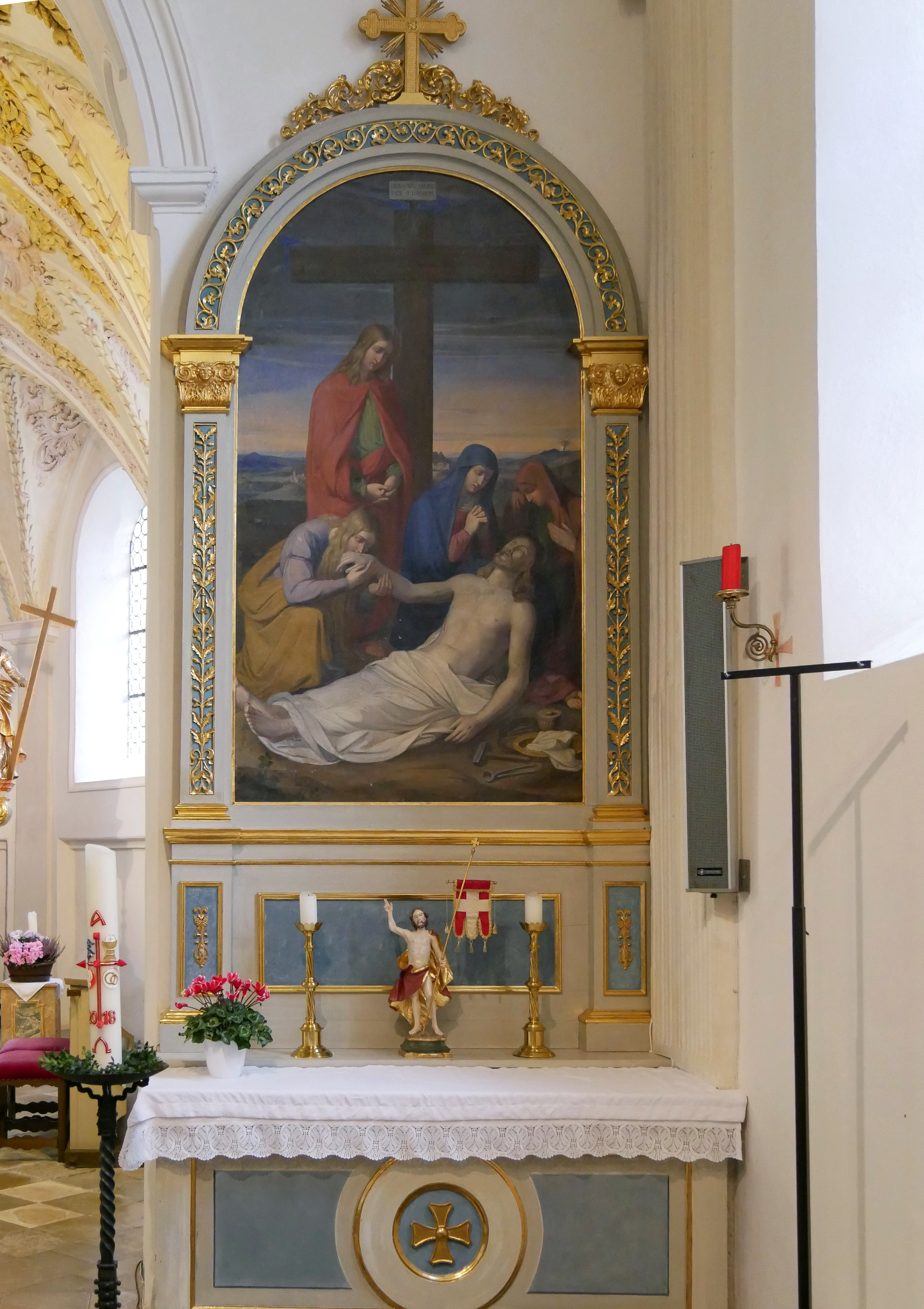
Southern (right) side altar, depicting the Descent from the Cross

=== Ceiling ===
The ceiling boasts elaborate stucco work and paintings on the ceiling, most notably paintings of the Vision of Constantine and Moses lifting the Brazen Serpent.

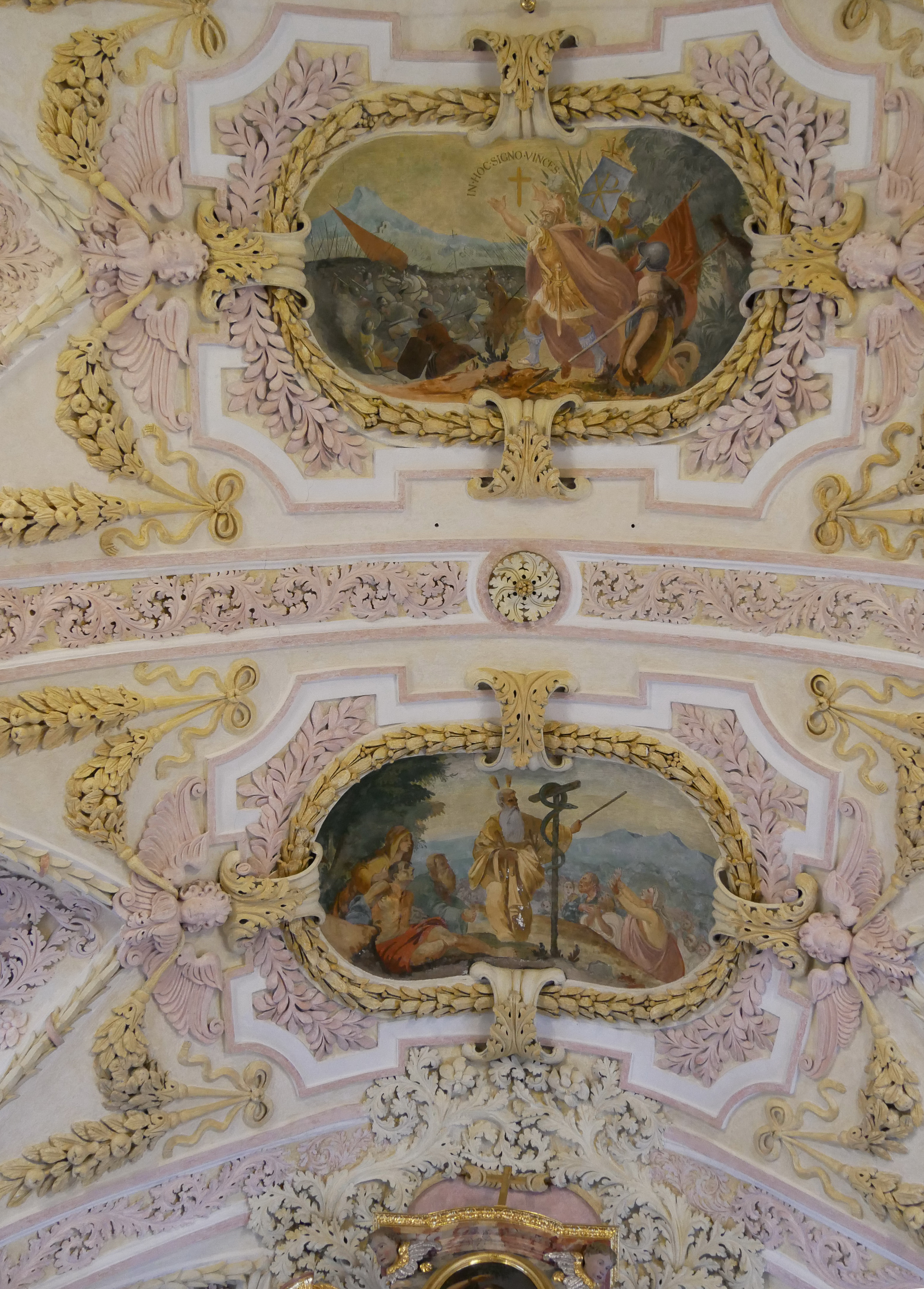
Upper painting: The Vision of Constantine. Lower painting: Moses holding the Brazen Serpent

Plasterwork, especially the ceiling, was carried out in the Baroque reworking by Johann Schmuzer, a prominent architect in the Wessobrunner School.

=== Exterior ===
The exterior of the church is very simple and characteristic of other churches in the area and in rural Southern Germany as a whole. The octagonal bell tower, sporting an onion dome, was added to the exterior in 1727. The bell tower also displays a small analog clock above its belfry, the latter of which is adorned with abat-sons to direct the bells' tolling toward the ground.
