= Christine Koggel =

Canadian philosopher

- Education: Carleton University (BA, MA); Queen's University (PhD)
- Occupations: Professor of Philosophy, academic
- Organization: Carleton University

Christine Koggel is Professor of Philosophy at Carleton University in Ottawa, Canada. She is a specialist in development ethics, particularly on the ethics of care.

== Early life and education ==
Koggel studied English and philosophy at Carleton University, where she received a Bachelor of Arts with first-class honors in 1978 and a Master of Arts in philosophy with distinction in 1981. Her master's thesis examined Ludwig Wittgenstein's later philosophy of meaning.

She received a PhD in philosophy from Queen’s University in 1994. Her doctoral dissertation was titled A Relational Theory of Equality.

== Academic career ==
Before her appointment at Carleton University in 2013, she was Harvey Wexler Professor of Philosophy and Co-Director of the Center for International Studies at Bryn Mawr College.

== Academic appointments ==
Koggel began teaching philosophy at Carleton University as a sessional lecturer till1992 and subsequently worked as an instructor and teaching assistant at Queen’s University from 1990 to 1994. From 1994 to 1995, she held a postdoctoral fellowship from the Social Sciences and Humanities Research Council of Canada and served as an assistant professor at York University.

She joined Bryn Mawr College in 1996 as an assistant professor of philosophy. She became an associate professor in 2001 and a professor in 2006. From 2007 to 2009, she held the Bower Carty Professorship of Ethics and Public Affairs at Carleton University and directed its Centre on Values and Ethics.

Koggel returned to Bryn Mawr College in 2009 as the Harvey Wexler Chair in Philosophy, serving also as chair and majors' advisor. In 2013, she became a professor in the Department of Philosophy at Carleton University.

=== Philosophical work ===
Koggel's research examines the role of relationships, social structures, and power in accounts of justice and inequality. Her 1998 book Perspectives on Equality: Constructing a Relational Theory developed this approach.

Her work in feminist philosophy examines equality, gender, oppression, agency, empowerment, and the relationship between autonomy and social relationships, including in the contexts of globalization and development.

In care ethics and relational ethics, she has examined the relationship between care and justice and edited collections and journal issues on care ethics and its applications.

Her later work has focused on injustice and epistemic injustice, including silencing, marginalization, and exclusion and their effects on agency and self-determination.

=== Editorial and professional work ===
Koggel has served in editorial roles for several academic journals, including Ethics and Social Welfare, Journal of Human Development and Capabilities, and Journal of Global Ethics. She served as lead co-editor of Journal of Global Ethics from 2018 to 2023 and joined its editorial advisory board in 2026.

She has also held positions in professional philosophical organizations, including the Canadian Society for Women in Philosophy and the International Development Ethics Association. She served as president of the Canadian Society for Women in Philosophy from 2006 to 2008.

== Publications ==
- Perspectives on Equality: Constructing a Relational Theory. Lanham, MD: Rowman & Littlefield, 1998.
- Moral Issues in Global Perspective. Broadview Press, 1999.
- Confidential Relationships: Psychoanalytic, Ethical, and Legal Contexts. Edited with Allannah Furlong and Charles Levin. Rodopi, 2003.
- Contemporary Moral Issues. 5th ed. Co-ed/ with Wesley Cragg. Toronto: McGraw-Hill, 2005.
- Moral Issues in Global Perspective. 2nd edition in 3 volumes (Volume I: Moral and Political Theory; Volume II: Human Diversity and Equality; Volume III: Moral Issues). Editor. Peterborough: Broadview Press, 2006.
- "Care Ethics: New Theories and Applications." First Special Issue of Ethics and Social Welfare. v.4 no. 2 July 2010. Guest Ed.with Joan Orme.
- "Care Ethics: New Theories and Applications." Second Special Issue of Ethics and Social Welfare. v.5 no. 2, July 2011. Guest Ed, with Joan Orme.
- "Gender Justice: Local and Global." Special Issue of Ethics and Social Welfare. v.6, no. 3, September 2012. Guest Ed. with Cynthia Bisman.
- Care Ethics: New Theories and Applications. Reprint of two special issues of Ethics and Social Welfare. Co-editor with Joan Orme, Routledge, 2013.
- Our Faithfulness to the Past: The Ethics and Politics of Memory. Sue Campbell. Edited by Christine Koggel and Rockney Jacobsen. Oxford University Press, 2014
- Examining Injustice: Foundational, Structural, and Epistemic Issues. Expanded reprint of special issue of Ethics and Social Welfare. Routledge, 2018.
- Interpretation, Relativism, and Identity: Essays on the Philosophy of Michael Krausz. Edited with Andreea Ritovoi. Lexington Books, 2018.
- Relational Theory: Feminist Approaches, Implications, and Applications. Edited with Ami Harbin and Jennifer Llewellyn. Journal of Global Ethics, 2022; expanded edition, Routledge, 2025.

=== Selected journal articles ===
- Koggel, Christine M. (1994). "A Feminist View of Equality and Its Implications for Affirmative Action". Canadian Journal of Law and Jurisprudence. 7 (1): 43–59. doi:10.1017/S0841820900002551.
- Koggel, Christine M. (2002). "Equality Analysis in a Global Context: A Relational Approach". Canadian Journal of Philosophy. 28: 246–272. doi:10.1080/00455091.2002.10717589.
- Koggel, Christine M. (2003). "Globalization and Women's Paid Work: Expanding Freedom?". Feminist Economics. 9 (2–3): 163–184. doi:10.1080/1354570022000077935.
- Koggel, Christine M. (2007). "Empowerment and the Role of Advocacy in a Globalized World". Ethics and Social Welfare. 1 (1): 8–21. doi:10.1080/17496530701237142.
- Koggel, Christine (2010). "The Ethics of Empowerment". Development. 53 (2): 175–178.
- Koggel, Christine (2013). "Is the Capability Approach a Sufficient Challenge to Distributive Accounts of Global Justice?". Journal of Global Ethics. 9 (2): 145–157. doi:10.1080/17449626.2013.818458.
- Koggel, Christine M. (2013). "A Critical Analysis of Recent Work on Empowerment: Implications for Gender". Journal of Global Ethics. 9 (3): 263–275. doi:10.1080/17449626.2013.818383.
- Koggel, Christine M. (2014). "Relational Remembering and Oppression". Hypatia. 29 (2): 493–508. doi:10.1111/hypa.12079.
- Koggel, Christine M. (2017). "Remembering and Loving in Relationships Involving Dying, Death, and Grief". Hypatia. 32 (1): 193–198. doi:10.1111/hypa.12303.
- Koggel, Christine M. (2017). "The Epistemological and the Moral/Political in Epistemic Responsibility: Beginnings and Reworkings in Lorraine Code's Work". Feminist Philosophical Quarterly.
- Koggel, Christine M. (2018). "Epistemic Injustice in a Settler Nation: Canada's History of Erasing, Silencing, Marginalizing". Journal of Global Ethics. 14 (2): 240–251. doi:10.1080/17449626.2018.1506996.
- Koggel, Christine M. (2019). "Agency, Participation, and Self-Determination for Indigenous Peoples in Canada: Foundational, Structural, and Epistemic Injustices". Éthique et économique. 17 (1).
- Koggel, Christine M. (2020). "Feminist Relational Theory: The Significance of Oppression and Structures of Power: A Commentary on "Nondomination and the Limits of Relational Autonomy" by Danielle M. Wenner". International Journal of Feminist Approaches to Bioethics. 13 (2): 49–55. doi:10.3138/ijfab.13.2.06.

== Selected chapters in edited collections ==
- Koggel, Christine M. (2008). "Agency and Empowerment: Embodied Realities in a Globalized World". In Maynell, Letitia; Campbell, Sue; Sherwin, Susan (eds.). Agency and Embodiment. Penn State University Press. pp. 313–336.
- Koggel, Christine M. (2012). "A Relational Approach to Equality: New Developments and Applications". In Downie, Jocelyn; Llewellyn, Jennifer (eds.). Being Relational: Reflections on Relational Theory and Health Law and Policy. Vancouver: University of British Columbia Press. pp. 63–88.
- Koggel, Christine M. (2018). "Gender: Feminist Insights on Inequality in Development". In Drydyk, Jay; Keleher, Lori (eds.). Handbook of Development Ethics. Routledge. pp. 116–133.
- Koggel, Christine M. (2019). "Expanding Agency: Conceptual, Explanatory, and Normative Implications". In Keleher, Lori; Kosko, Stacy (eds.). Agency, Democracy, and Participation in Global Development. Cambridge University Press. pp. 155–177.
- Koggel, Christine M. (2023). "Feminist Philosophy and Poverty". In Schweiger, Gottfried; Sedmak, Clemens (eds.). Routledge Handbook of Philosophy and Poverty. Routledge. pp. 178–191.
- Koggel, Christine M. (2025). "Indigenous Voices and Relationships: Insights from Care Ethics and Accounts of Hermeneutical Injustice". In Bourgault, Sophie; FitzGerald, Maggie; Robinson, Fiona (eds.). Decentering Epistemologies and Challenging Privilege: Critical Care Ethics Perspectives. Rutgers University Press. pp. 15–30.

== Awards and Recognition ==
Koggel received doctoral and postdoctoral fellowships from the Social Sciences and Humanities Research Council of Canada between 1992 and 1996. She subsequently received several faculty research awards from Bryn Mawr College.

In 2026, she received a Graduate Faculty Mentorship Award at Carleton University in recognition of . exceptional dedication to graduate education through roles as supervisors and research mentors.
