= Powernet =

Powernet LLC
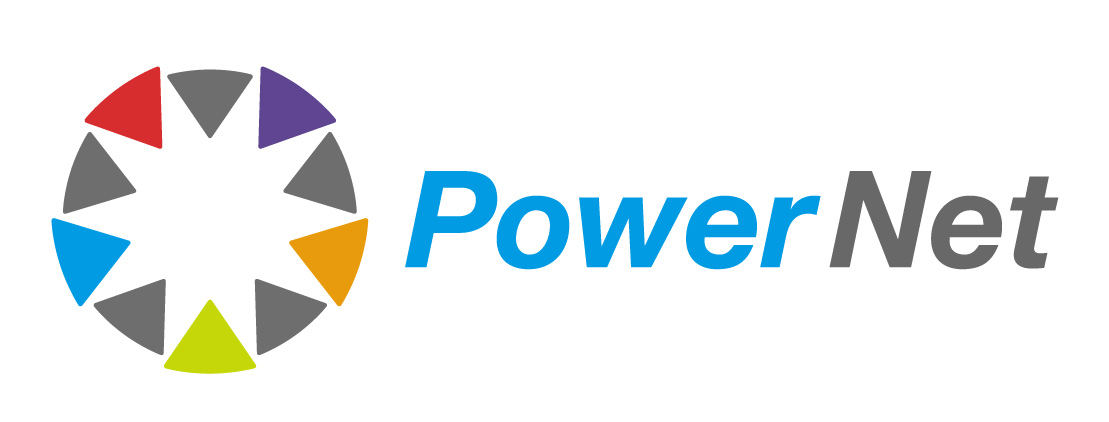
- Company type: Limited Liability Company
- Industry: telecommunications
- Founded: 1996 (as KIT); 1997 (as BOL.bg); 2008 (as Powernet)
- Headquarters: Sofia, Bulgaria, (contacts)
- Area served: Sofia municipal area
- Key people: Boyan Georgiev (CEO), Ivo Peev (DBD), Plamen Milanov (CTO), Lubomir Plankov (CFO), Angel Haralampiev (Administrative manager)
- Products: Broadband Internet, CaTV, DigitalPhones, Metro&Long distance Ethernet, Dark Fiber
- Revenue: ▲€3.460 million (2009)
- Net income: ▲€0.918 million (2009)
- Total assets: ▲€5.065 million (2009)
- Owner: P&S EAST GROWTH Luxembourg
- Number of employees: 175 (2011)
- Subsidiaries: ExtremeNet (100%); BOL.bg East (50%); PAMNET (50%)
- Website: www.powernet.bg

Powernet (Powernet LLC), also known as Пауърнет, is a telecommunications company with activities in the broadband Internet, CaTV and Digital phones. It is headquartered in Sofia, Bulgaria. Currently the company is the biggest broadband Internet services provider to end-users in the region of Sofia municipality. It serves about 35 000 residential, and over 1 500 business customers.

== History ==
The company was formed after a series of over 60 A&M of various-sized Internet Service Providers (ISPs) into Powernet LLC. The biggest acquisitions being the ones of BOL.bg (in 2006), and of Airbites Bulgaria, a daughter company of SwissCom CEE(in 2009).

- 1996: One of the first Internet service providers in Bulgaria was founded – KIT LLC.
- 1997: BOL.bg LLC (BOL.bg) was founded
- 2003: Powernet LLC was founded
- 2005–2008 Powernet, KIT and BOL.bg acquire 100% of 50 small and medium-sized LAN Internet providers
- 2006: P&S acquire 100% of KIT and BOL.bg
- 2008: P&S acquire 100% of Powernet
- 2009: KIT and BOL.bg merge in Powernet, and Powernet acquire 100% of Airbites Bulgaria from SwissCom CEE
- 2010: Powernet joins the BTT project

== Perspective ==
On 22 November 2010, Powernet joined the BTT,(Bulgarian Telecom & Television Jsc) project, which united 11 of the biggest regional Internet, CaTV and Phone service providers in Bulgaria. The customers served increased to 150 000 in 40 towns and 110 locations in Bulgaria. BTT covers more than 1 million households. During 2011, BTT will offer integrated services – television, internet, fixed and mobile phones at full national coverage.
