= Des Gasper =

Des Gasper is a development studies academic. He works as a professor of Human Development, Development Ethics and Public Policy, at the International Institute of Social Studies in the Erasmus University Rotterdam. A major focus of his work is development ethics with important contributions examining the ways different conceptual frameworks influence development policy debates. More recently his work has looked at migration and climate change.

Gasper is one of the co-lead editors of the Journal of Global Ethics.

== Selected publications ==
- Gasper, D. (1997). Sen's capability approach and Nussbaum's capabilities ethic. Journal of International Development, 9(2), 281-302.
- Gasper, D. (2002). Is Sen's capability approach an adequate basis for considering human development?. Review of political economy, 14(4), 435-461.
- Gasper, Des (2004), The Ethics of Development, Edinburgh: Edinburgh University Press.
- Gasper, Des (2005) Beyond the International Relations framework: an essay in descriptive global ethics, Journal of Global Ethics, 1:1, 5-23, DOI: 10.1080/17449620500106651
