= Denis Goulet =

Denis Goulet (27 May 1931 – 26 December 2006) was a human development theorist and a founder of work on development ethics as an independent field of study. Goulet's definition of Development Ethics is that it is a field that examines the ethical and value questions related to development theory, planning, and practice. He sought to synthesize insights from philosophy, policy practice, and anthropology to better understand development ethics.

Goulet was a professor emeritus in the Department of Economics and Policy Studies at University of Notre Dame. He had also served as a faculty fellow at the Kellogg Institute for International Studies and at the Joan B. Kroc Institute for International Peace Studies.

He took his undergraduate and master's degrees in Philosophy from St. Paul's College, he took a master's degree in Social Planning from IRFED in Paris; and took his PhD in Political Science from the University of São Paulo, Brazil.

== Influences ==
Goulet's work drew its major inspiration from the writings and examples of a group French religious intellectuals including Charles de Foucauld, Simone Weil, Louis-Joseph Lebret and the “worker priests” of the last century and from the hunger and thirst for justice of the gospel of Matthew.

== Components of Development ==
Thirlwall, notes Goulet's contribution to the broadening of the notion of development to include economic and social objectives and the values that societies strive for. In this context he quotes Goulet's (1971) distinguishing of three basic components or core values of development:

1. life-sustenance
2. self-esteem
3. freedom.

This analysis can be viewed as a precursor to the work of Amartya Sen and the Human Development Index.

== Key works ==
Goulet, D. (1971) The Cruel Choice: A New Concept in the Theory of Development, New York, Athenaeum

Goulet, D (2006) Development Ethics at Work Explorations - 1960-2002, ISBN 978-0-415-49404-5 ISBN 978-0-415-77021-7 (Electronic) 978-0-203-08664-3 Routledge, UK
