= Partner development =

Partner development is a customer-centric approach to business development. It draws from the customer development framework popularized by Steve Blank.

Partner Development is a process by which a firm seeking to form partnerships approach potential partners in advance to reduce the risk of providing the wrong things. The process has firms ask a structured set of questions in the form of polling, open-ended feedback and with a mindset towards solving real problems for them.

The feedback that is collected through the Partner Development process is formulated into a set of requirements that form the business development go-to-market strategy. Once the requirements have been ratified, firms can ensure that what they build and provide to partners has been validated prior to resources being expended.

Partner Development can also solicit Letters of Intent (LOIs) that determine a 'minimum viable product,' where non-binding commitments by potential partners increase the assurance that partners will later agree to binding relationships. It also helps partners feel that they had a direct hand in forming a firm's go-to-market strategy.

Partner Development is derived from many of the principles of the Lean Startup Circle.
