= Abat-son =

Architectural element

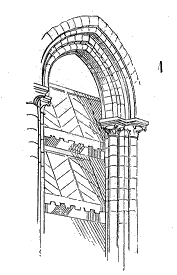
Illustration of an abat-son

An abat-son (plural usually abat-sons) is an architectural device constructed to reflect or direct sound in a particular direction. It consists of large louvers. The term is commonly used to refer to angled louvers in a bell tower or belfry designed to redirect sound or to prevent ingress of water.

Abat-son can also refer to a louver or board used in the device. These boards or sheets are typically made of wood or metal.

The term comes from the French abat-sons, literally abat 'it strikes down' and sons 'sounds'.

== In the windshields ==
The slats, generally of the grid type and fixed to a carpentry frame, are usually made of wood or covered with metal, slate or lead; In addition to redirecting the sound of the bells towards the ground, they prevent rain or snow from penetrating the bell tower and allow the tower's carpentry to be ventilated. «Beffroi», is an architectural technical Gallicism that appeared in the 19th century, replacing the popular name of «windscreen» (abat-vent).

Loudspeakers are often inserted into twin bays on each of the steeple faces, more rarely in the skylights of steeple arrows. These vain bell towers are typically flanked by columns with capitals and decorations, in Romanesque architecture, with archivolts, and with interlocking fretwork in Gothic architecture. Turntables developed especially from the 13th century, and were often already decorated with fretwork, serrated bottoms, or embossed in lead.

== Gallery ==
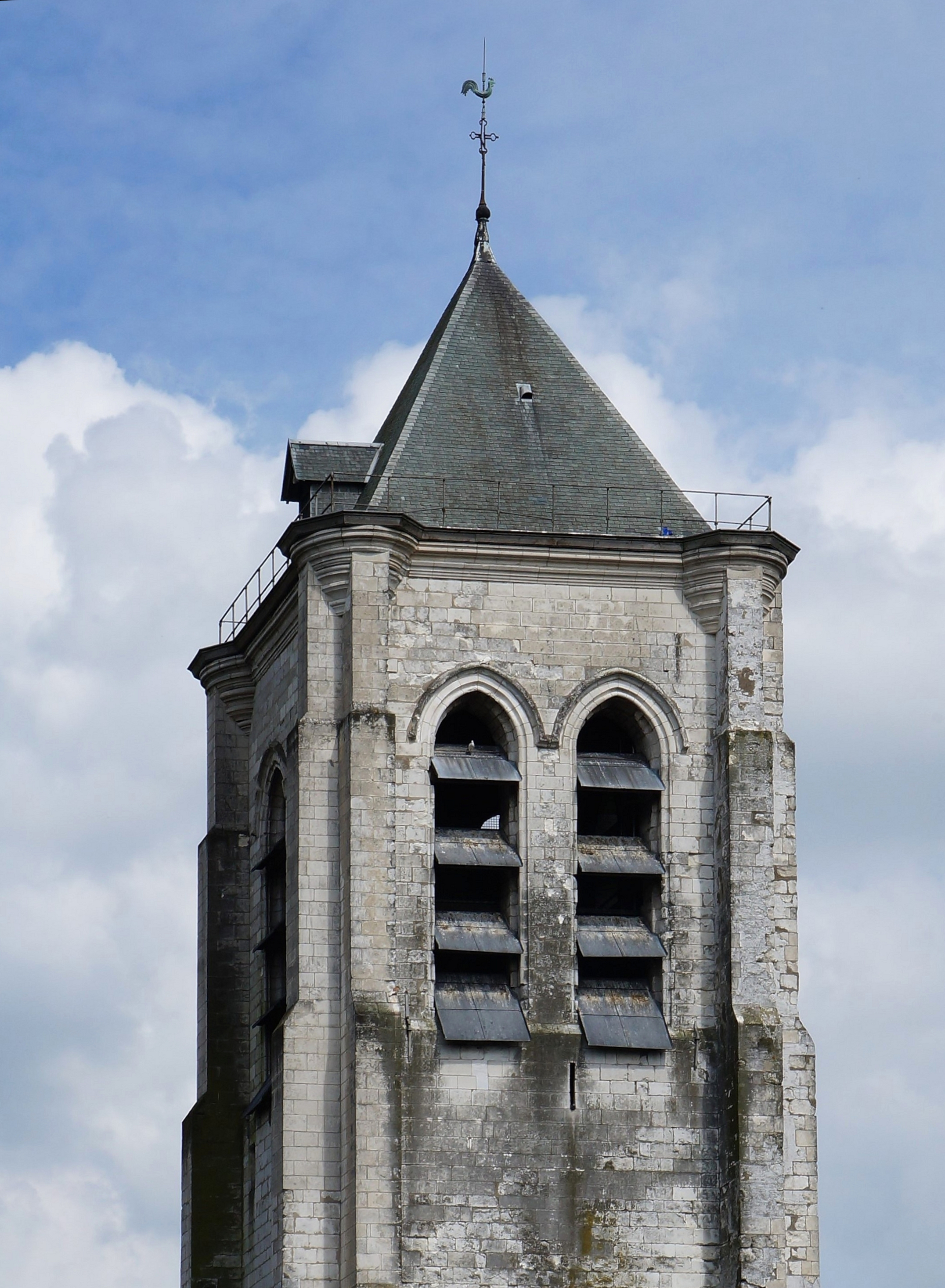
Church of Saint-Pierre in Flers-Bourg Villeneuve-d'Ascq

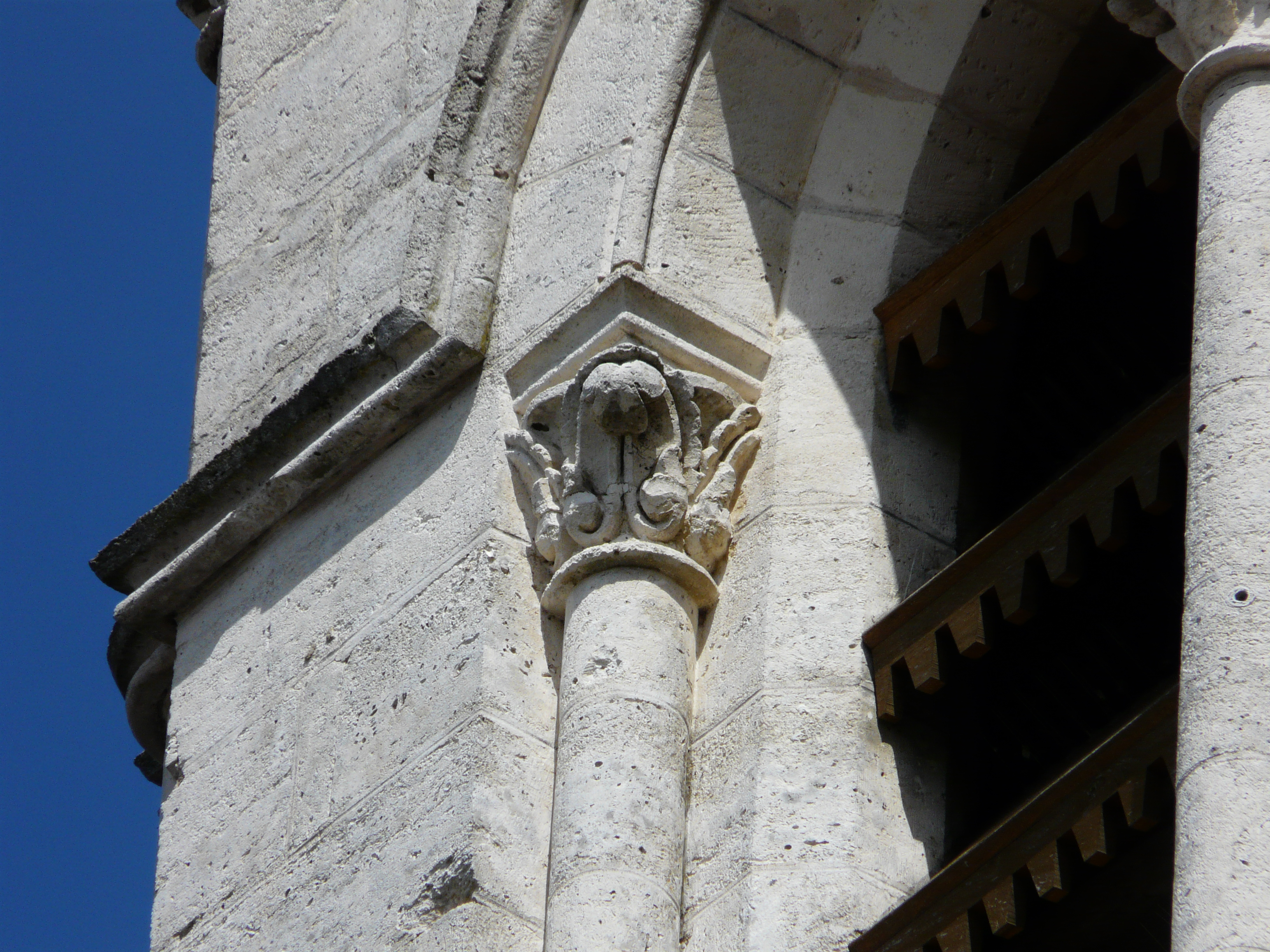
A church in Trélissac

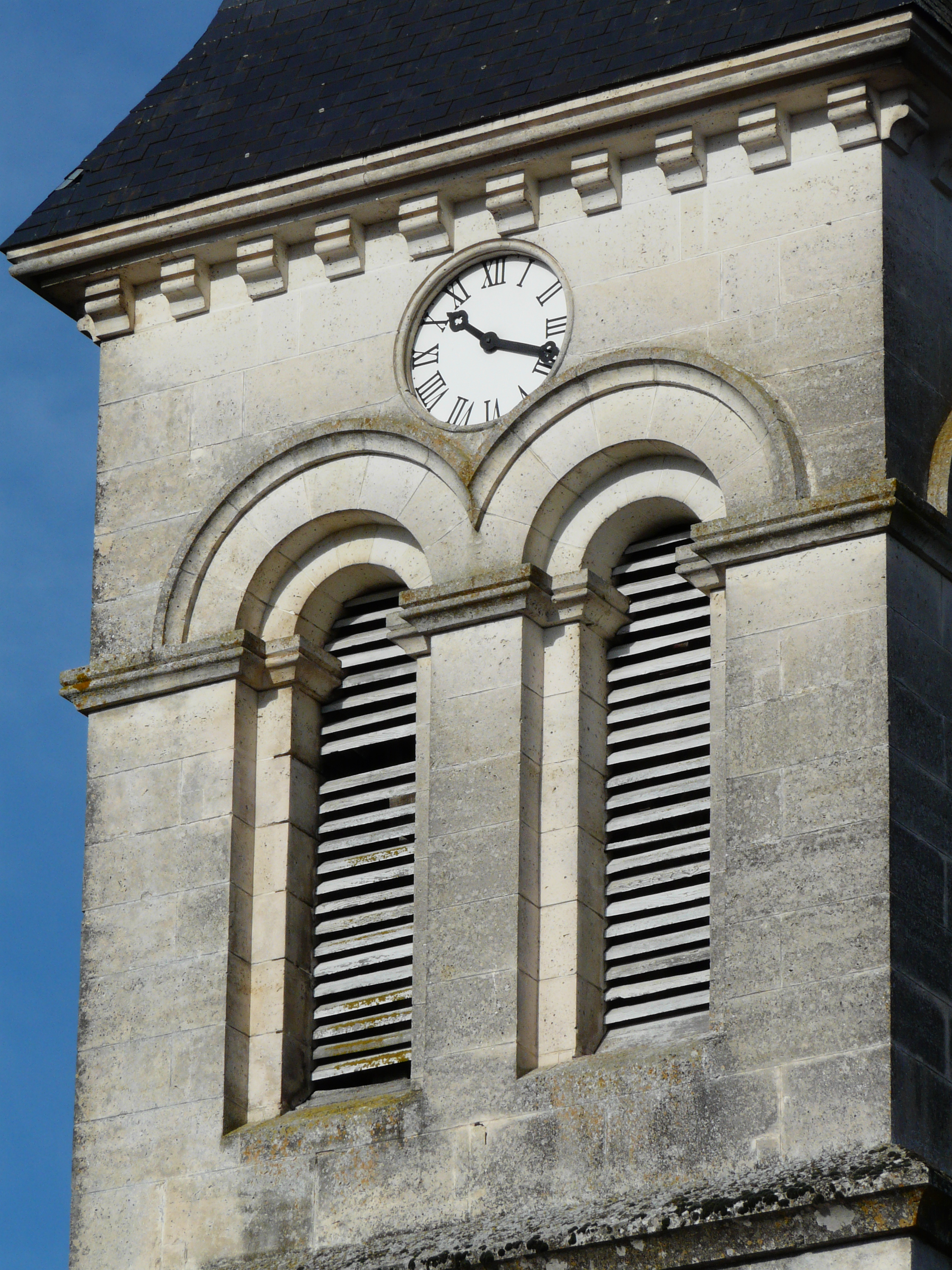
Church of Saints Peter and Paul, La Tour-Blanche

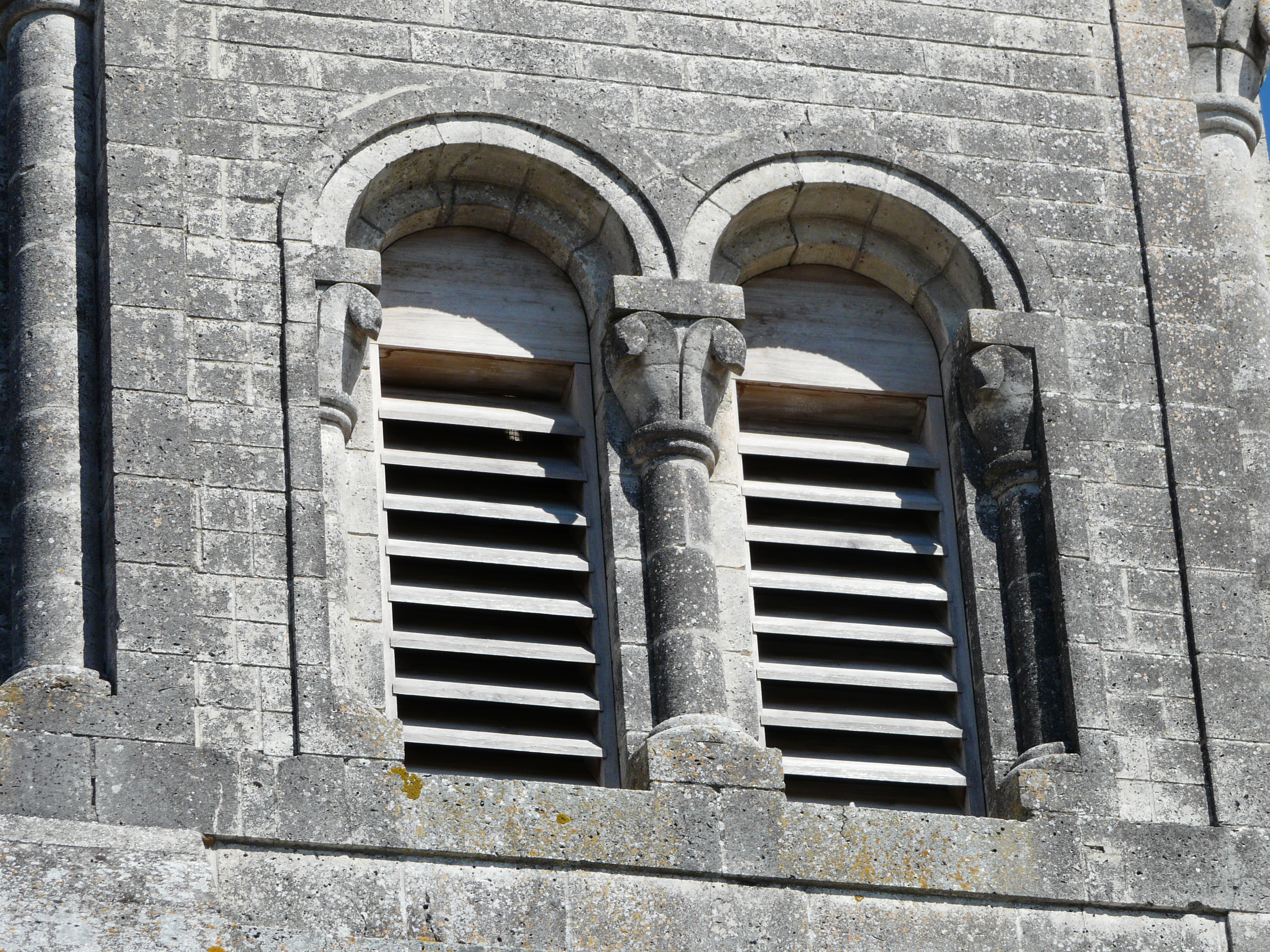
Church of Our Lady of the Assumption, Échourgnac
