= Gaudium et spes =

Vatican II document on the church in the modern world

Gaudium et spes (Ecclesiastical Latin: [ˈɡau̯di.um et ˈspes]; English: "Joys and Hopes"), the Pastoral Constitution on the Church in the Modern World, is the last of the four constitutions promulgated during the Second Vatican Council between 1963 and 1965. Issued on 7 December 1965, it was the Council's longest published document and the first constitution published by a Catholic ecumenical council ever to address the entire world.

Gaudium et spes clarified and reoriented the role of the church's mission to people outside of the Catholic faith. It was the first time that the church took explicit responsibility for its role in the larger world. The constitution's creation was necessitated by fear of the irrelevance in the modern era due to its ignorance on problems that plague the modern world. The document represents an inner examination of the church by the council and features a response to problems affecting the modern world.

Within Gaudium et spes are the themes of gift of self and the promotion of peace. While initial reception of the document was focused on the shift in theological considerations, reception of Gaudium et spes today marks the document as a turning point in the Church's focus on the world.

With the failure of the Church to respond promptly to major global events such as World War II and the Holocaust, Pope John XXIII began Vatican II with an emphasis on examining the role of the church in the world. This culminated with the creation of Gaudium et spes to address the role of the church in serving the world outside of Christianity. During the creation of the document itself, Gaudium et spes went through multiple versions of Schemas to reflect the idea Pope John XXIII wanted to achieve during the council. After long debate during the council over Gaudium et spes, the document came to cover a wide range of topics examining the inner workings of the Church and its interactions with the world as a whole. Such topics include marriage and family, the development of culture, economics, politics and peace and war.

Because of this role addressing how the Catholic Church relates towards the world at large, compared to the focus of Lumen Gentium on how the church understands itself, Gaudium et spes and Lumen gentium have been called "the two pillars of the Second Vatican Council".

Approved by a vote of 2,307 to 75 among the bishops assembled at the council, it was promulgated by Pope Paul VI on 7 December 1965, the day the council ended. As is customary with Catholic documents, the title is taken from its opening words in Latin "the joys and hopes". The English translation begins:

The joys and hopes, the grief and anguish of the people of our time, especially of those who are poor or afflicted, are the joys and hopes, the grief and anguish of the followers of Christ as well.

== Background ==
=== Context within Vatican II ===
At the beginning of the Second Vatican Council on October 11, 1962, Pope John XXIII celebrated the opening Mass of the council, during which he indirectly brought to light the economic and political issues for which the council was summoned. Such issues included the devastation of World War II, Nazi horrors, the current threat of a nuclear war between the United States and Russia, and the end of colonialism and racism. The church had failed to act substantially on these issues, contributing to a feeling of irrelevance within larger considerations of the state of the world. From an ecclesiastical standpoint, there were open issues concerning completing the work of the interrupted First Vatican Council and the need for reform within the church. As a result of these problems, in his opening speech, Gaudet Mater Ecclesia, Pope John XXIII distanced the council from focusing solely on the gloom of the problems of the world as the Church had done in previous councils. He wanted the council to focus on "the marvelous progress of the discoveries of human genius", while orienting the role of the church to one that should deal with right and wrong in the world. The council, as a whole, was to be an update to the essential inner workings and teachings of the church to better fit the modern world. Gaudium et spes was to be the culmination of this as Pope John XXIII envisioned the constitution to share in the "joys and the hopes" of the entire world.

Following the death of John XXIII, his successor Pope Paul VI also referred to the relationship between the church and the changing world in his first encyclical letter, Ecclesiam Suam.

=== The creation of the text of Gaudium et spes ===
Gaudium et spes was not drafted before the council met, but arose from the floor of the council and was one of the last to be promulgated. In preparation for the council, Pope John XXIII asked for suggestions concerning the substance of Vatican II. In a large width of responses sorted through by a commission appointed by the Pope, there resulted in 67 thematic documents that would be placed for discussion during the council. Four of those documents, dealing with the church in the modern world, ultimately formed the logical backbone of what would become Gaudium et spes. In what is described as a turning point of the council, the harsh disagreement over the four documents drove the attendees to invalidate all 67 thematic documents as inadequate. This led to Pope John asking Cardinal Leo Jozef Suenens to create a new agenda for the council in November 1962. The agenda was to include an examination on the Church and its role within the modern world, as necessitated by the debate over the four documents in question. By December 1962, Suenens revealed his work. The role of the church would be split between different viewpoints: "Ad intra", internally, and "ad extra", externally. These ultimately resulted in Lumen Gentium and Gaudium et spes, respectively. Schema 17 and, toward the end of the council, Schema 12 inspired the later creation of Gaudium et spes. Schema 12, while focusing on the church's role in world social issues, underwent many changes before ultimately being rejected by the attendees over a lack of cohesion within the document.

Cardinal Suenens was again tasked with producing a new schema; however, Pope John XXIII died before its completion on June 3, 1963. Upon the election of Pope Paul VI on June 21, 1963, Pope Paul continued the creation of the document. When the revised Schema 12 was published in September 1963, it was met with intense scrutiny by the bishops. Ultimately, the schema, through multiple revisions that lasted until 1964, was transformed into Schema 13, which would become Gaudium et spes. Schema 13 not only related the role of the church to the world but also dealt with questions dealing with modern problems. On November 16, 1964, Schema 13 was approved to be edited after all of the Bishops' suggestions were aggregated. Father Pierre Haubtmann led a commission tasked with editing the schema. Over the period of the next year, Father Haubtmann led discussions and continued to develop the schema in line with discussion offered during the council. Approved by a vote of 2,307 to 75 of the bishops assembled at the council, Schema 13 was promulgated as Gaudium et spes by Pope Paul VI on 7 December 1965, the day the council ended.

== Overview ==
The Dogmatic Constitution, Gaudium et spes, was addressed "not only to the sons of the Church and to all who invoke the name of Christ, but to the whole of humanity" as part of the council's effort to appeal to the larger considerations of the Catholic Church.

Whereas the First Vatican Council in 1869–70 had tried to defend the role of the church in an increasingly secular world, the Second Vatican Council focused on examining the role of the Church in the modern world.

Gaudium et spes was adopted after Lumen Gentium, the Constitution on the Church, and it reflects the ecclesiological approach of that text. Gaudium recognized and encouraged the laity to take on "his or her own distinctive role" in the modern world. In recent years, Church leaders, such as Cardinal Francis Arinze, have since clarified this to mean that laity should work to make themselves competent in their own profession, and observe laws proper to "each discipline". The decree was debated at length and approved by much the largest and most international council in the history of the Church.

The ecumenical constitution created by the Second Vatican Council focused on the role of the church within the modern world. It was the last document promulgated during the Second Vatican Council and the first church document to place the church within the significance of the world. Gaudium et spes illustrated the church is aware of problems within the world and its responsibilities toward them. While world problems are a focus of the text, it also brings to light the human person and their orientation toward God as well as the mission of the church itself. The mission of the Church needed to recognize the realities of secularization and pluralism. Bishop Christopher Butler points out that a key principle behind the "audacious change" in this and in several earlier outward-looking documents of the council was that the Church is "Christ himself using us as his instruments to bring salvation to all", and in charity we must "presume that those who differ from us… are nevertheless [people] of good will". As a whole, Gaudium et spes represented an inner looking of the Church on itself so that it may take responsibility and comment on issues affecting the world.

Such issues of responsibilities in the world are highlighted by the cardinals of the council such as Leo Joseph Suenens of Belgium, who urged the council to take on social responsibility for war, poverty, and Third World suffering. This stance was supported by other prominent clergy members including Cardinal Giovanni Battista Montini of Milan, who became Pope Paul VI, and Cardinal Lercaro of Bologna. Additionally, Thomas Rosica points out that the Council Fathers "... were men who had experienced two world wars, the horror of the Holocaust, the onset of the nuclear weaponry, the hostility of communism, the awesome and only partially understood impact of science and technology." In the Introduction it states: "the Church has always had the duty of scrutinizing the signs of the times and of interpreting them in the light of the Gospel."

Marie-Dominique Chenu, professor of the Pontifical University of Saint Thomas Aquinas, Angelicum was influential in the composition of Gaudium et spes, as was Louis-Joseph Lebret. "The problem of poverty and of overcoming it through a healthy economy, respectful of the primary value of the person, allows for a vast discussion on political ethics in Gaudium et spes." In the end, the "council exhorts Christians, as citizens of two cities, to strive to discharge their earthly duties conscientiously and in response to the Gospel spirit".

== Contents ==
=== Central themes ===
==== Gift of self ====
The "gift of self" from GS §24 was a phrase used often by Pope John Paul II and particularly in his theology of the Body. This phrase has also been described as "the Law of the Gift". Citing the biblical concept that all men are created in the image of God, Gaudium states that man cannot truly find himself unless he understands the "gift of self", and that in understanding himself he will understand and love both God and his fellow man.

Although no Vatican source has been found defining precisely what the "gift of self" is, some scholars and Church leaders appear to interpret it in recent decades as being associated with marriage.

==== Promotion of peace ====
The final chapter of the document is "The Fostering of Peace and the Promotion of a Community of Nations". This chapter references themes expressed near the start of Vatican II by Pope John XXIII in 1963 in his encyclical letter, Pacem in Terris. Pacem defines the "common good", arguing that while individualism leads to individualistic focus and behavior and collectivism leads to a loss of the individual, the "common good" strikes a middle ground and begins with the focus on the community before returning it to the individual. Pacem focuses its argument not on a theological basis, but rather employs "natural law" to appeal to both believers and non-believers who might not be as familiar with theological sources.

== Reception ==
=== Immediately following Vatican II ===
Initial opposition came in the form of debate over the theological basis of Vatican II and Gaudium et spes. According to Henri de Lubac, the theological balance of nature and grace before the Council was overturned in favor of nature and the world which goes against the importance placed upon transcendence.

=== Later reflections ===
Gaudium et spes has been evaluated as the shift of the church to its new globalized view of the world. It serves as the basis for multiculturalism in the modern church and has become the basis of the church's message to the world today. The Church has, nevertheless, been criticized for "failing to read the lessons" embodied in the document.

More recently, the document's frequent references to "the human heart" and "the heart of man" have been reflected in several quotations used by Pope Francis in his encyclical letter, Dilexit nos.
