= Eric Palmer (philosopher) =

- Education: University of California, San Diego
- Occupation: Professor
- Known for: History and Philosophy of Science, Global Ethics

Eric Palmer is Professor of Philosophy at Allegheny College. His academic work focuses in two areas: development ethics and history and philosophy of science. He is co-editor of Journal of Global Ethics and is President of the International Development Ethics Association.

== Education and career ==
Palmer earned his B.A. in Philosophy from Carlton University in 1987, and his Ph.D. in Philosophy from the University of California, San Diego in 1991, where Philip Kitcher was his advisor. From 1991 to 1993, he was a Visiting Assistant Professor in the Department of Philosophy at the University of Utah, before moving to the University of Kentucky from 1993 to 1994. In 1994, he began teaching at Allegheny College, where he was promoted to Professor in 2012.

== Writing ==
Palmer has authored and edited a number of articles and books in history and philosophy of science, global ethics, and European intellectual history.

Edited books

- Eric Palmer (ed.) Gender Justice (vol. 2): Vulnerability and Empowerment. Routledge, London & New York, 2015. 137pp
- Voltaire. Candide, or, All for the Best. Eric Palmer (ed.). Broadview Press, Peterborough & New York. Sept. 2009.

Articles

- “Real Institutions and Really Legitimate Institutions,” David Mark, ed. The Mystery of Capital and The Construction of Social Reality. Open Court, 2008. 331-347.
- “Corporate Responsibility and Freedom,” Controversies in International Corporate Responsibility. John Hooker, ed. Philosophy Documentation Center, 2007. 25-34.
- “Multinational Corporations and Social Contracts,” Journal of Business Ethics 31 (3), May 2001. 245-58.
