= Development ethics =

Sources of morality

Development ethics is a field of enquiry that reflects on both the ends and the means of economic development. It typically takes a normative stance, asking and answering questions about the nature of ethically desirable development and what ethics means for achieving development, and discusses various ethical dilemmas that the practice of development has led to. Its aim is to ensure that "value issues" are an important part of the discourse of development.

== Key themes ==
Development ethics typically looks at development theories and practice and their relationships with:

- Social justice
- Human rights
- Basic needs

A major focus of the literature is on the "ethics of the means". This involves asking not only how to realize the goals of development but also what are ethical limits in their pursuit.

Denis Goulet, one of the founding fathers of the discipline, argued in The Cruel Choice (1971) that "Development ethics is useless unless it can be translated into public action. By public action is meant action taken by public authority, as well as actions taken by private agents by having important consequences for the life of the public community. The central question is: How can moral guidelines influence decisions of those who hold power?"

== Prominent development ethicists ==
- David A. Crocker
- Séverine Deneulin
- Jay Drydyk
- Des Gasper
- Denis Goulet
- Lori Keleher
- Serene J. Khader
- Christine Koggel
- Stacy Kosko
- Louis-Joseph Lebret
- Gunnar Myrdal
- Martha Nussbaum
- Eric Palmer
- Ingrid Robeyns
- Dudley Seers
- Amartya Sen
- Nikos Astroulakis
