= Business development =

Processes to develop growth opportunities within organizations

Business development entails tasks and processes to develop and implement growth opportunities within and between business organizations. It is a subset of the fields of business, commerce and organizational theory. Business development is the creation of long-term value for an organization from customers, markets, and relationships. Business development can be taken to mean any activity by either a small or large organization, non-profit or for-profit enterprise which serves the purpose of 'developing' the business in some way. In addition, business development activities can be done internally or externally by a business development consultant. External business development can be facilitated through planning systems, which are put in place by governments to help small businesses. In addition, reputation building has also proven to help facilitate business development.

== Overview ==
In the limited scholarly work available on the subject, business development is conceptualized as or related to discrete projects, specific modes of growth, and organizational units, activities, and practices. Sørensen integrates these different perspectives with insights from chairmen and managing directors, senior business developers, and venture capitalists from successful high-tech firms worldwide, which is adopted in the Palgrave Encyclopedia of Strategic Management:

″Business development is defined as the tasks and processes concerning the analytical preparation of potential growth opportunities, and the support and monitoring of the implementation of growth opportunities, but does not include decisions on strategy and implementation of growth opportunities.″

== Background ==
In practice, the term “business development” and the role of the “business developer” have evolved to encompass a wide range of applications. Today, the responsibilities associated with business development vary across industries and countries, often including tasks performed by IT programmers, specialized engineers, advanced marketers, key account managers, and professionals involved in sales and relationship management with current and prospective customers. As a result, it has become challenging to clearly define the unique characteristics of the business development function and to determine whether these activities directly contribute to profitability.

Recent systematic research on the subject has outlined that the contours of an emerging business development function with a unique role in the innovation management process. The business development function seems to be more utterly matured in high-tech, and especially the pharma and biotech industries.

== Professionals ==
The business developer is concerned with the analytical preparation of potential growth opportunities for the senior management or board of directors as well as the subsequent support and monitoring of its implementation. Both in the development phase and the implementation phase, the business developer collaborates and integrates the knowledge and feedback from the organization's specialist functions, for example, research and development, production, marketing, and sales to assure that the organization is capable of implementing the growth opportunity successfully. The business developers' tools to address the business development tasks are the business model answering "how do we make money" and its analytical backup and roadmap for implementation, the business plan.

Business development professionals frequently have had earlier experience in sales, financial services, investment banking or management consulting, and delivery; although some find their route to this area by climbing the corporate ladder in functions such as operations management. Skill sets and experience for business-development specialists usually consist of a mixture of the following (depending on the business requirements):

- Sales
- Finance
- Marketing
- Mergers and acquisitions
- Legal
- Strategic management
- Proposal management or capture management
- Cultural agility

The "pipeline" refers to the flow of potential clients that a company has started developing. Business development staff assign to each potential client in the pipeline a percent chance of success, with projected sales volumes attached. Planners can use the weighted average of all the potential clients in the pipeline to project staffing to manage the new activity when finalized. Enterprises usually support pipelines with some kind of customer relationship management tool or database, either web-based solution or an in-house system. Sometimes business development specialists manage and analyze the data to produce sales management information. Such management of information could include:

- reasons for wins/losses
- progress of opportunities in relation to the sales process
- top-performing salespeople/sales channels
- sales of services/products

For larger and well-established companies, especially in technology-related industries, the term "business development" often refers to setting up and managing strategic relationships and alliances with other, third-party companies. In these instances, the companies may leverage each other's expertise, technologies, or other intellectual property to expand their capacities for identifying, researching, analyzing and bringing to market new businesses and new products. Business development focuses on the implementation of the strategic business plan through equity financing, acquisition/divestiture of technologies, products, and companies, plus the establishment of strategic partnerships where appropriate.

Business development should be thought of as a marketing tactic. The objectives include branding, expansion into markets, new user acquisition, and awareness. However, the main function of business development is to utilize partners to sell to the right customers. Creating opportunities for value to be ongoing in the long term is important. To be successful in business development, the partnership must be built on strong relationships.

== Business development and ethics ==
=== Facilitated development ===
Business development is affected by external factors. Planning systems are systems set in place in order to regulate businesses. In many cases, ruling agencies deem regulation necessary for business survival. There is a section of business that is dedicated to facilitating ethical business development in developing countries. In the early 2000s, business ethics was dedicated to helping the businesses in need that are in these countries. However, owing to the strong backlash from critics, they have changed their focus into helping businesses that are going to help the most people develop. These policies have improved the quality of life of the people. However, this facilitation changes the norms and, in turn, harms some groups. In order to enforce the new policies in an ethical manner business ethicists have created a cost-benefit analysis, placing an emphasis on basic necessities. These concerns have become so great that business ethicists have created a new department called development ethics. Now, instead of simply helping developing businesses, international business developers have begun ensuring that the companies keep basic human rights in mind. This especially applies to countries where the laws are not so strict and allow for abuse to take place. These development policies now have to follow the criteria that Penz created, consisting of: security, empowerment, rights, equity, integrity, and cultural freedom. The idea of providing people with human rights in order to facilitate business development can be seen through the rapid development of China in the last few decades. The policies that were implemented in the last couple decades coincide with these developments. In the 1980s, government policies facilitated the rise in literacy rate and education. The following decade, healthcare coverage increased significantly. This development was not originally seen as monetary capital, but instead, it was seen as human capital. With more workers able to bring skill and maximum effort to their workplace, companies were able to develop extremely rapidly.

=== Reputation building ===
With companies becoming more and more conscious of ethical practices, closely watching themselves to avoid scrutiny, a company's reputation has become a great concern. Ethical business practices are closely tied with reputation which makes it essential to follow ethical guidelines if a company is looking to build their reputation. In fact, businesses that develop quickly and successfully have tendencies to show honesty, impartiality, and service to all of their stakeholders. In order for a company to be considered "ethical", it must cater to the needs of the customer, keeping their best interest in mind. This will influence customers to make repeated purchases and lead to more profit. In order for a company to build a strong reputation with their suppliers, it is crucial for them to focus on impartial business interactions and developing long relationships. These relationships can lead to mutually-beneficial business deals for both the company and its supplier. With the employees, they must take their interests into consideration and facilitate teamwork as opposed to rigorous competition. This ensures that the company will keep their most loyal and dedicated employees for as long as possible. Funding for further development can rise when a company is able to develop strong relationship with each stakeholder individually, and ethically. This is based on the concept of reciprocation, which states how in order for social change to take place between groups of people, trust must be built between them through mutually beneficial actions. This can be supported through the results of a questionnaire study that was conducted on technology industries in GTSM and TSE. In addition, in order for a company to practice business ethics, and ensure strong business development, it is essential to maintain a positive relationship with the environment. With concerns about the recent decline of the environment increasing, stakeholders have become more involved in efforts to preserve resources and a negative impact on the environment brings about risks of damaging stakeholder relationships.

== See also ==
- Mobile business development
- Partner development
