= Worker-priest =

Catholic missionary initiative in France

Worker-priest (French: Prêtre ouvrier, Prêtres au travail) was a missionary initiative by the French Catholic Church in particular for priests to take up work in such places as car factories to experience the everyday life of the working class. A worker-priest was any priest who was "freed from parochial work by his bishop, lived only by full-time labor in a factory or other place of work, and was indistinguishable in appearance from an ordinary workingman".

Although the movement spread to many other countries such as Belgium and Italy, the French were always the most prominent. The movement was an attempt to "rediscover the masses" of industrial class workers who had become largely disaffected with the church.

== History ==
Jacques Loew, a Dominican priest, who began working in the docks of Marseille in 1941, effectively started the worker-priest movement. Loew had been sent by fellow Dominican Louis-Joseph Lebret to "study the condition of the working classes" but not to actually join the workers.

In 1944, the first worker-priest missions were set up in Paris under its Archbishop Emmanuel Célestin Suhard, and then later in Lyon and Marseille. The Church hoped, by "putting young priests into secular clothes and letting them work in factories, to regain the confidence of the French working class, which [had] almost completely abandoned the Catholic faith."

=== Gradual suppression ===
In 1945, Pope Pius XII "approved (reluctantly) the daring social experiment of the French worker-priests." However, in the early 1950s, the worker-priest movement fell out of favor with the Vatican due to their role in left-wing politics and perceived abandonment of the traditional priesthood. The Worker-Priest movement was "severely constrained by a series of measures taken by the church in the 1950s".

In 1950, Pius XII, in an apostolic exhortation on the priestly life, expressed "reservations and suspicions of the worker-priests". Loew's May 1951 report defending the movement, written to Giovanni Montini (the future Pope Paul VI), then the assistant Cardinal Secretary of State, ultimately failed to convince the pope and the movement was forced to shut down in 1954.

Many of the priests joined in campaigns for improved pay and conditions and the movement became prominent in the industrial unrest of 1952 and 1953. This resulted in the factory owners complaining to the Catholic Church that the priests were being divisive by supporting the unions.

The French bishops informed the worker-priests that they must return to their parishes. About 50, however, chose to stay on at their work.

Moreover, by 1953, of some 90 priests, 10 had married, and about 15 were working with the communists. The Pope "sent verbal orders that the movement be suppressed, but the French cardinals managed to persuade the Pope to allow the worker-priests to continue 'in principle,' after some major changes in the setup."

In November 1953, all worker priests were recalled and required to leave their work and unions. In 1954, Loew acquiesced to the Vatican and quit his job; he then established the Saints Peter and Paul Mission to Workers, which trained priests from among the working class. Loew then travelled to Africa, then worked in the favelas of São Paulo, Brazil from 1964 to 1969, and then established the School of Faith in Fribourg, Switzerland. The theology of the Worker-Priest is in part contained within Loew's publications: Les dockers de Marseille (1944), En mission prolétarienne (1946), Les Cieux ouverts: chronique de la mission Saints Pierre et Paul (1971), and Face to Face with God: the Bible's Way to Prayer (1977).

The worker priests had gained certain insights about the alienation of the Church from the modern world and the poor from their experience as workers. These had been shared with many others including the Bishops by means of letters, newsletters, books and meetings and the then Papal Nuncio to France, Archbishop Angelo Roncalli. When Roncalli became Pope John XXIII in 1958, he called the Second Vatican Council, at least partly as a result of what the worker priests had revealed. In 1963, priests were allowed to return to the industrial workplaces, and during the Council, the French and Belgian Bishops in particular were very influential in shaping its direction towards renewal and engagement with the modern world. The Council's Decree on the Ministry and Life of Priests (1965) acknowledged the role of priests who "by manual labor ... share in the lot of the workers themselves - if there is need for this and competent authority approves".

== Later influence ==
On the advice of his mentor Cardinal Sapieha, Karol Wojtyla (future Pope John Paul II) and a fellow Polish priest studying in Italy, Stanislaw Starowieyski, travelled to France and Belgium to acquaint themselves with the worker-priest movement. Wojtyla, who had also performed hard labor during his time as a seminarian, reportedly admired the worker-priests. On his return in 1947, Wojtyla wrote a piece on the worker-priests for the Tygodnik Powszechny. Wojtyla wrote: "Father Loew came to the conclusion that the [Dominican] white habit by itself does not say anything any more today."

A similar movement emerged in the Church of England in the 1960s.

By the 1990s there were about 2,000 priests of the workers mission in France, although they were aging in line with the wider population of Catholic priests in that country.

== Current practice ==
It is somewhat common, though not the rule or norm, for religious brothers and sisters, and for some religious order priests, even some in contemplative life, to have learned and to practice, to a greater or lesser degree, some trade or profession besides the sacred sciences like philosophy or theology (such as education, medicine, law, nursing, farming, accounting, business, lab sciences). Some diocesan (secular, or non-religious) priests in the West and East also do this, either full-time or part-time. Any such training and work is carried out with the advice of the spiritual director and confessor, and with the consent and advice, or, if applicable, the command or request, of the pastor and the Ordinary (the Bishops or their equivalents as diocesan superiors in church law), or the local male or female religious order superior. If the religious or the cleric is still in formation, the rector and the vocation director would normally need to give their consent, as well. The place where the individual is to go for admittance and their training, and the place of employment, must also consent.

== See also ==
- Frans van der Hoff
- Little Brothers of Jesus
- Simone Weil
