= Dominique Xardel =

French author and professor

- Education: Paris Dauphine University
- Occupations: Author; marketing professor

Dominique Xardel (1934 - 2026) is an author and marketing professor in France.

From 1978 to 1988, Xardel was director of ESSEC Business School He was Editor in Chief of the Harvard L'Expansion, the French version of the Harvard Business Review. As of 2005, he was Associate Dean for International Affairs at ESSEC. He holds a Doctorate degree from the University of Paris IX-Dauphine. Xardel worked for businesses such as Unilever and Time Inc before joining ESSEC, and he has taught at Geneva Business School in Switzerland. Xardel has authored various books on marketing
