= Louis-Joseph Lebret =

French priest and social scientist (1897–1966)

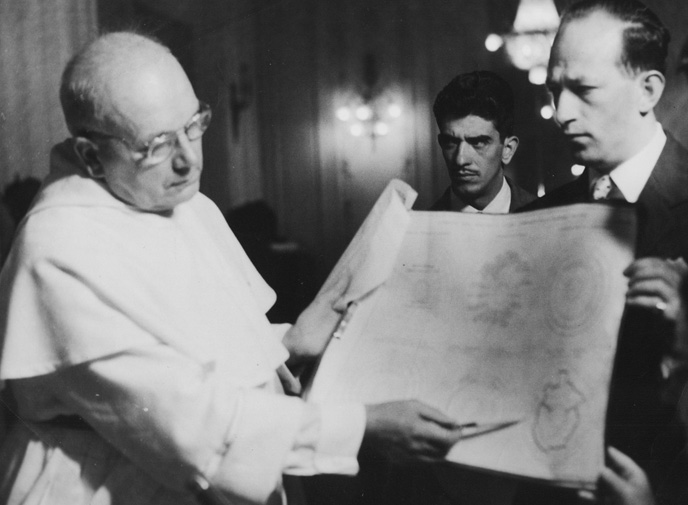
Lebret in Colombia

Louis-Joseph Lebret (June 26, 1897–July 20, 1966) was a French Dominican social scientist and philosopher and pioneer of development ethics, who sought to "put the economy at the service of man" and advanced the notion of the "human economy".

== Life ==
Louis-Joseph Lebret was born on 26 June 1897 in Minihic, Brittany, in a family of sailors, closely connected to the peasant farmers of the area. His father was a marine carpenter. He entered the Brest Naval School (“l’Ecole Navale de Brest”), became a marine officer, fought in World War I with the Lebanese squadron, and was briefly director of the port of Beirut. In 1922, he became an instructor at the Naval Academy. When his religious vocation became clearer (after his visit to a Jesuit convent in Zahleh), he left the marines in 1923 to become a Dominican priest and was ordained in 1928.

== St. Malo ==
After completing his theological studies, he was assigned to Saint-Malo in 1929 where he observed the destitution of the fishermen and their families. He conducted in-depth surveys among the fishermen, regarding their problems and needs, in an effort to find solutions. For ten years he studied connections between unemployment, low wages, the poorly organized local fishing industry and the attempt on the part of international firms to monopolize the best fishing areas. Lebret determined that the vulnerability of the small scale local fishermen to the broader market had ingrained structural causes. He conducted over 400 studies on fishing conditions from areas as diverse as Britain, the Baltic and the Mediterranean. At the same time, he established trade unions, co-ops, and maritime associations to re-configure the way business was done.

During World War II, he was drafted to protect French fishing and oversee merchant marine policy. In 1941, he founded in Marseille, with François Perroux, Henri Desroche and others Économie et Humanisme (Economy and Humanism), in the Lyons region, whose objective was to study economic systems and social change, proposing to “put back the economy at the service of man”. In 1942, the Revue Economie et Humanisme was created.

== Third World ==
A lecture trip to Brazil in 1947 led Lebret to focus on development in the Third World. He worked in Brazil (1947-1954), Colombia (Lebret Mission 1955), Senegal (1958-1959), Lebanon (1960-1964), and other countries. Lebret believed that chronic structural evils cannot be corrected by subjective good will but by transformation of those structures, which presupposes a thorough understanding of how they work. He believed in the necessity of combining research and rigorous analysis with action. He was recognized by the United Nations as an expert on the question of living-standard disparities in the world.

In 1958, he founded the International Institute for Research and Training, Education and Development (IRFED), later called the International Center Development and Civilizations - Lebret - IRFED.

Lebret championed concern for development as a concern of the Catholic Church. He was aware of the challenges posed to the Church and the Western by underdevelopment and pushed the argument for an increased solidarity with poor countries. He was called upon by Pope Paul VI to participate as an expert in the Vatican Council and assisted in the drafting of Gaudium et spes. He was tasked by the Pope with working in Ariccia, together with 29 Council Fathers, 38 experts and around 20 lay people, on the approximately 20,000 notes, criticisms and motions drawn up for Schema XIII, the final draft of the encyclical.

He was also asked to represent the Holy See at the first UNCTAD (United Nations Conference for Trade and Development) which took place in Geneva in 1965. Père Lebret was one of the experts consulted in the drafting of the 1967 encyclical Populorum progressio.

He worked for ecumenism, including Christian-Muslim dialogue. That made him doubly attractive for Chehab, president of a religiously mixed country of Lebanon, from 1958 to 1964. It made "selling" Lebret to Lebanese Christians easier and was another reason, in addition to Lebret`s socioeconomic vision, why Muslims as much as Christians, affectionately called him abūnā, our father.

Rwandan president Grégoire Kayibanda tried to enlist the help of Lebret to work on economic development plans for the country, but Lebret's direct contribution to these plans remained limited due to illness. Nevertheless, Kayibanda's economic policy drew inspiration from Lebret's work and thought.

Lebret died in Paris on 20 June 1966.

== Works ==
Denis Goulet singles out Lebret as an early voice in defense of ethically-based development.

- The Mystique of a New World, (1941) - censored by Vichy and re-published in 1947 as The Discovery of the Common Good
- Action, Movement Toward God (1949)
- The Human Ascent (1951)
- Dimensions of Charity (1958)
- Concrete Dynamics of Development (1961)

Goulet argues that Lebret left a legacy with five lessons for the increasingly globalised world:

1. that development decision-makers must study the expressed needs of populations in whose benefit they profess to work
2. the need to link micro issues to macro questions
3. the priority of needs over wants or preferences (expressed by effective purchasing power).
4. that development is multidimensional: embracing economic, social, political, cultural, environmental, and spiritual components of human well-being.
5. the need to globalize solidarity.

== Other sources ==
- Garreau (Lydie), Louis-Joseph Lebret, 1897-1966. Un homme traqué, Villeurbanne, Éditions Golias, 1997.
- Houée (Paul), Louis Joseph Lebret. Un éveilleur d’humanité, Paris, Éditions de l’Atelier, 1997.
- Lavigne (Jean-Claude), Les écrits spirituel du Père Lebret, Paris, Cerf et Éditions de l’Atelier, 1996.
- Malley (François), Le Père Lebret: L'économie au service des hommes, Paris, Cerf, 1968.
- Becker (Charles), Missehougbe (Pierre-Paul) et Verdin (Philippe), Le père Lebret, un dominicain économiste au Sénégal (1957 - 1963), Paris, Karthala, 2007
- Malsagne (Stephane), Chronique de la construction d'un Etat. Journal au Liban et au Moyen-Orient (1959-1964), Ed. Geuthner, 2014.
