= Échourgnac =

- Commune
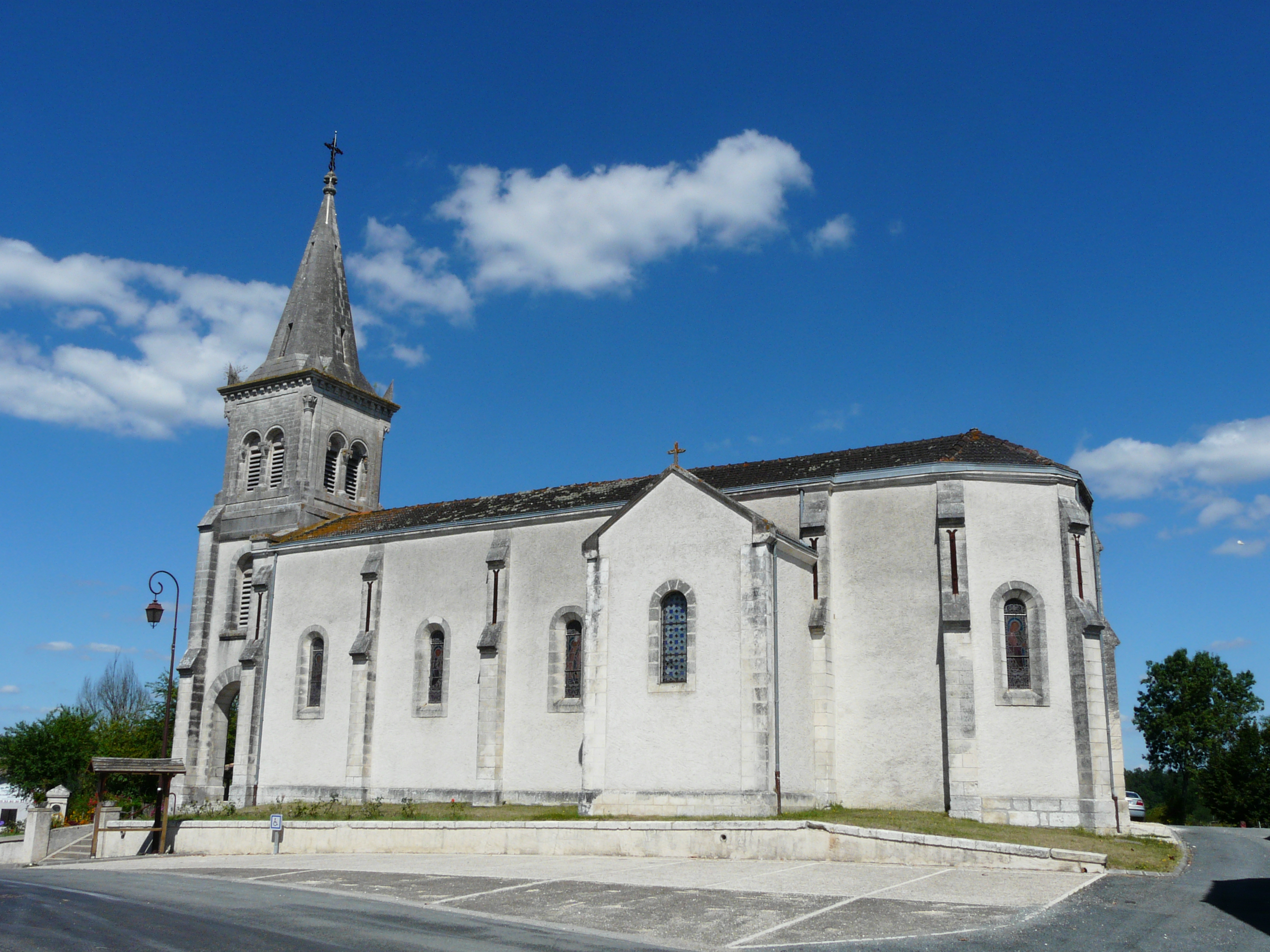
- Our Lady of the Assumption's Church

- Coat of arms
- Location of Échourgnac
- Location within France Location within Nouvelle-Aquitaine
- Coordinates: 45°07′35″N 0°13′51″E
- Country: France
- Region: Nouvelle-Aquitaine
- Department: Dordogne
- Arrondissement: Périgueux
- Canton: Montpon-Ménestérol

Government
  - Mayor (2020–2026): Jacques Gambro
- Area^{1}: 34.88 km^{2} (13.47 sq mi)
- Elevation: 105 m (344 ft)
- Highest elevation: 131 m (430 ft)
- Lowest elevation: 57 m (187 ft)
- Population (2023): 395
  - Density: 11.3/km^{2} (29.3/sq mi)
- Time zone: UTC+01:00 (CET)
  - Summer (DST): UTC+02:00 (CEST)
- INSEE/Postal code: 24159 /24410
- ^{1} French Land Register data, which excludes lakes, ponds, glaciers > 1 km^{2} (0.386 sq mi or 247 acres) and river estuaries.

Échourgnac (French pronunciation: [eʃuʁɲak]; Occitan: Eschornhac) is a commune in the Dordogne department in Nouvelle-Aquitaine in southwestern France.

It is the site of a Cistercian abbey, Notre-Dame de Bonne Esperance, which is renowned for producing cheese.

== Population ==
Historical population
Year	Pop.	±% p.a.
1968	445	—
1975	401	−1.48%
1982	443	+1.43%
1990	411	−0.93%
1999	402	−0.25%
2007	420	+0.55%
2012	426	+0.28%
2017	392	−1.65%
2023	395	+0.13%
Source: INSEE

== See also ==
- Communes of the Dordogne department
