= Journal of Global Ethics =

Ethics journal

- Discipline: Ethics
- Language: English
- Edited by: Vandra Harris Agisilaou, Des Gasper, Thomas R. Wells

Publication details
- History: 2005–present
- Publisher: Routledge
- Frequency: Triannual

Standard abbreviations
- ISO 4: J. Glob. Ethics

Indexing
- ISSN: 1744-9626
- OCLC no.: 61136559

Links
- Journal homepage; Online access; Online archive

The Journal of Global Ethics is a triannual peer-reviewed academic journal established in 2005, dealing with theory and practice of global ethics, and ethics in the context of globalisation. It publishes articles in English, providing a forum for philosophical inquiry into ethics and values in their relationship to globalisation, human development, international relations, peace and war, social movements, environmental justice, economics and politics. The editors-in-chief are Vandra Harris Agisilaou (RMIT University), Des Gasper (International Institute of Social Studies and Erasmus University, and Thomas R. Wells (Leiden University).

== Abstracting and indexing ==
The journal is abstracted and indexed in:

- Cambridge Scientific Abstracts
- EBSCO databases
- Philosopher's Index
- Philosophy Research Index
- Scopus
