= Patrick Rice =

Former Catholic priest and human rights activist

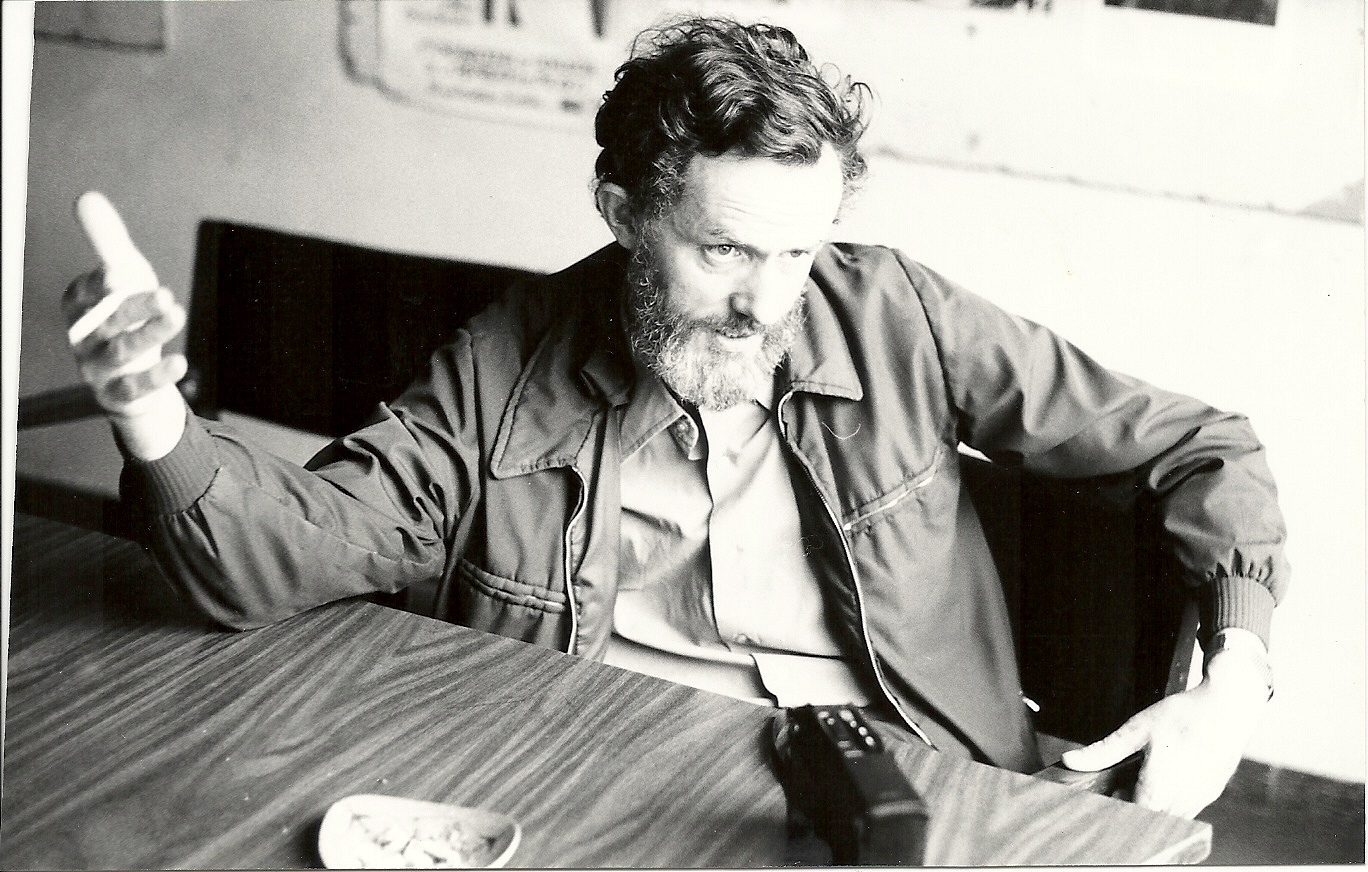
- Rice during an interview in Mexico City (1982).
- Born: 1945; Fermoy, County Cork
- Died: July 8, 2010 (aged 64); Miami, Florida
- Education: St. Patrick's College, Maynooth
- Occupations: Priest; Human rights activist
- Spouse: Fátima Cabrera
- Children: Carlos Rice Cabrera; Amy Rice Cabrera; Blanca Rice Cabrera

Patrick Michael Rice (also Patricio Rice) (September 1945 – 8 July 2010) was an Irish human rights activist and former Catholic priest and religious who became a resident of Argentina. He was a campaigner on behalf of the families of the "disappeared", the victims of that nation's dirty war during the 1970s. He himself was kidnapped and tortured as a part of that activity by the Argentine military dictatorship.

== Life ==
Rice was born in Fermoy, County Cork, to a farming family. He joined the Divine Word Missionaries, studied philosophy and theology at St. Patrick's College, Maynooth, and was ordained in 1970, at which point he was posted to Argentina. Soon afterwards he left the Divine Word Missionaries, and, in 1972, entered the Little Brothers of the Gospel of Charles de Foucauld, a religious congregation dedicated to sharing the lives of the poorest of the earth. His first post of assignment was in the Santa Fe Province. He later continued his work in Buenos Aires, initially in the town of La Boca, later in Villa Soldati.

In the years following, Rice ran extensive human rights education programmes and helped form a union movement all the while working as a labourer priest. He also began his investigation of the "disappeared", which he was later highly regarded for. Through his social work in Villas miseria (shanty towns) he gained the trust and respect of their residents, the cooperatives, and the Catholic mission. It was through his work in a chapel in these villas that he met a young Capuchin friar, Carlos Armando Bustos, and also a group of lay members, amongst whom was the young catechist Fátima Cabrera.

Rice was kidnapped on 11 October 1976 in La Plata by security forces of the dictatorship as part of the National Reorganization Process. He was hooded and taken to the Navy School of Mechanics (known as ESMA, used as a torture centre during the dictatorship), where he was tortured brutally; the Inter-American Commission on Human Rights took on his case. After pressure from the Irish government and his religious order he was eventually freed, and was deported. Soon he was living in London, but returned permanently to Argentina in 1984. By that time, many of his friends, including Bustos, had been killed. In 1981 he co-founded and served as secretary for the Federación Latinoamericana de Familiares de Detenidos-Desaparecidos (Fedefam), which represented the families of the imprisoned and disappeared.

After leaving both the Little Brothers and the priesthood in 1985, Rice married Fátima Cabrera, who had been arrested and tortured at the same time as him; they had three children. He continued his work as a human rights advocate with the Little Brothers, becoming a member of their Secular Fraternity. He also served as secretary for the Movimiento Ecuménico por los Derechos Humanos, working for the Protestant clergy of the country.

In 2010, while returning to Argentina from a visit to his family in Ireland, Rice was changing planes in Miami, Florida, United States, when he suffered a sudden cardiac arrest and died instantly. His body was returned to Argentina for burial.

== Legacy ==
In 2004 ESMA, where Rice had been held and tortured, was converted into a memorial museum; in December 2010 its chapel was converted into an ecumenical prayer space named Espacio Patrick Rice (Patrick Rice Space). The idea to use the room where Catholic military chaplains had blessed the actions of the death squads which had operated the prison had come from Rice himself.
