= Carlo Carretto =

Italian writer and Catholic priest

The Reverend Carlo Carretto PFE
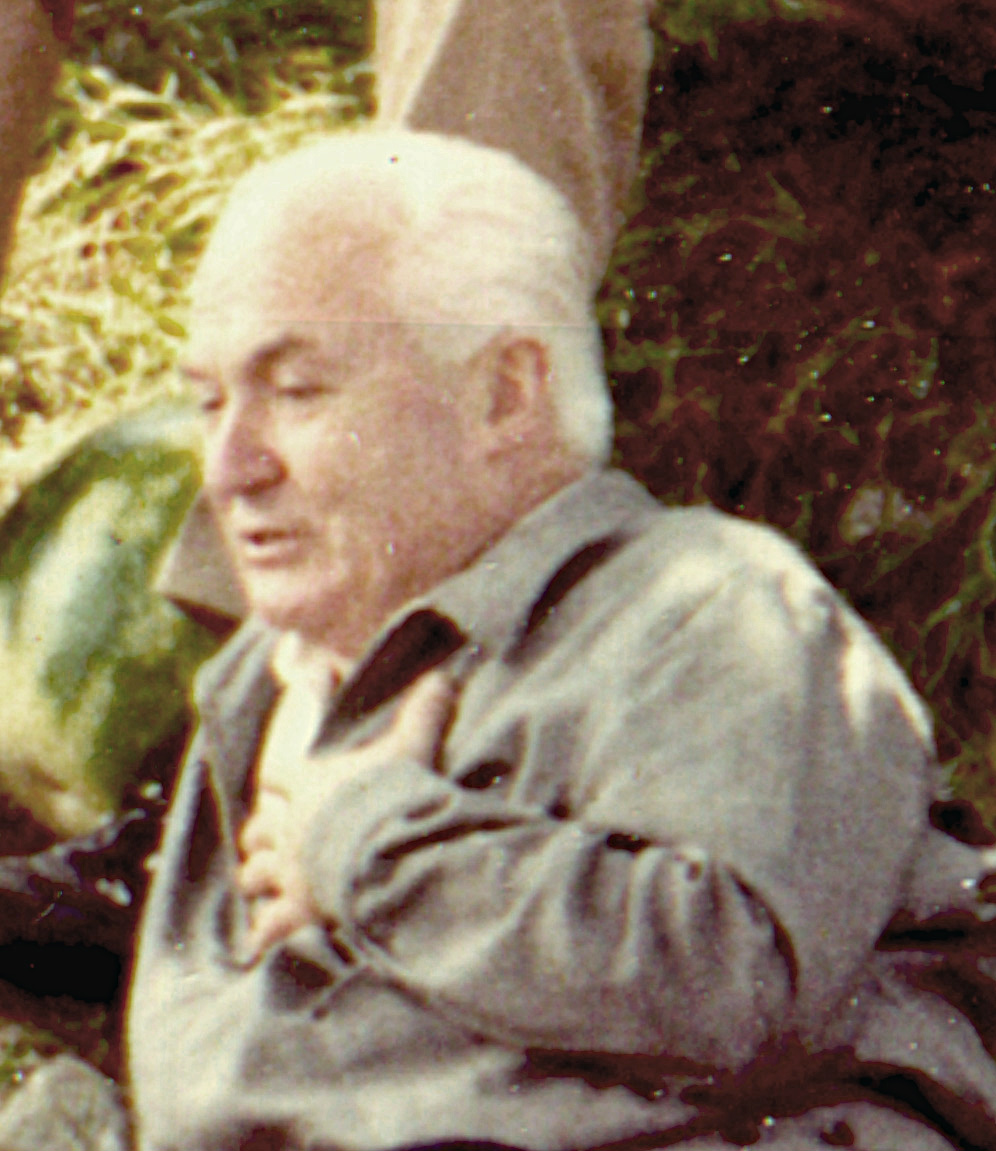
- Carlo Carretto at the Hermitage Beata Angela in Spello in August of 1972
- Born: 2 April 1910; Alessandria, Piedmont, Italy
- Died: 4 October 1988 (aged 78); Spello
- Occupations: Writer, member of the Little Brothers of the Gospel
- Known for: Social and political activism

Carlo Carretto PFE (2 April 1910 – 4 October 1988) was an Italian writer, Catholic and member of the Little Brothers of the Gospel.

== Biography ==
=== Early life ===
Born in a peasant family from the Langhe, Carretto was the third of six children, four of whom went on to join religious orders. Early in his life, the family moved to a suburban neighborhood in Turin, where there was a Salesian oratory which would have much influence on the formation of the whole Carretto family. He became a teacher and worked with Italian Catholic youth.

=== Social activism ===
He entered the youth sector of the Catholic Action in Turin at the age of twenty-three by the invitation of its then president Luigi Gedda. After completing his studies, he graduated in Philosophy from Turin. From 1936 to 1952, his involvement in Catholic Action grew until he became its National Youth President. In 1940, after winning a competition, he was sent to be the Educational Director in Bono, Sardinia. But his involvement there was short due to conflicts with the Fascist regime and the influence his teachings exerted on young people beyond the bounds of the school. So he was sent to Isili and then back to Piedmont. There he was allowed to resume his work as a teaching director at Condove, in Susa Valley, about 30 kilometers from Turin. With the advent of the Italian Social Republic, he received from Rome the task of reorganizing the structure of the Catholic Action of Northern Italy. From a business point of view, he was removed from the list of teaching directors and kept under surveillance for not having joined the regime.

At the end of the war in 1945, Caretto and Gedda jointly created the National Association of Catholic Masters in Rome. In 1946, he became the national president of the Italian Youth of Catholic Action (GIAC). In 1948, on the occasion of the 80th anniversary of the foundation of Catholic Action, he organized a large youth demonstration in Rome which became known as the famous gathering of the three hundred thousand "Green Basque". Shortly thereafter he founded the International Office of Catholic Youth, of which he became the vice president. In 1949, with his friend Enrico Dossi, he created a new agency within the GIAC dedicated to young people's tourism. In time it would become the Youth Tourism Center (CTG), of which he was the first national president.

In 1952 Carretto found himself in disagreement with an important part of the Catholic political world that desired an alliance with the political right. He had to resign from his position as president of GIAC. It was at this time that he decided to join the religious congregation of the Little Brothers of Jesus which had been founded by René Voillaume and inspired by Charles de Foucauld.

=== Religious life ===
On 8 December 1954, he left for the novitiate of El Abiodh, near Oran, Algeria. He later made vows and was ordained a priest. For ten years, he lived an eremitical life in the Sahara composed of prayer, silence and work, an experience he expressed in Letters from the Desert, as in all the books he would later write. It inspired him to create a quiet place in Italy for prayer.

He returned to Italy in 1965 and settled in Spello, Umbria, where Leonello Radi (a former president of GIAC) managed to have the fraternity of the Little Brothers of the Gospel entrust the former Franciscan convent of San Girolamo, near the cemetery. Brother Carlo was enthusiastic about the new arrangement. Leonello Radi said: "the main activity of Carlo Carretto was the eight hours of prayer a day, I carried him I do not know how many times with my red Beetle, during the trip we talked and, above all, we prayed". Soon the spirit of initiative of Carretto and the prestige it enjoys opened the community to the reception of those who, believers or not, wished to spend a period of reflection and search for faith lived in prayer, in manual work and in the exchange of experiences. At the convent where the Fraternity was, many country houses scattered on Mount Subasio were added, transformed into hermitages named after various holy figures. For over twenty years, Carretto was the animator of this center flanked by its many collaborators, friends and benefactors, including the Roman engineer Renato Di Tillo who was very important for the activity of the group and a fraternal friend also of Saint Teresa of Calcutta.

=== Later life ===
During these years, he continued his activities as a writer. One notable book of that period was the Small Family Church which provoked controversy in the Catholic world over whether the ideas it expressed align with Christian morality. A man of the word and of the pen, he used these two means very effectively to communicate to others his "discoveries" and his experience of faith.

His books have been translated into many languages creating a group of readers in many countries around the world. Consequently, he was often invited to bring his word to conferences and spiritual meetings.

Throughout his retirement, he always participated in the events of Italian society. In 1974, during the debate around the referendum on divorce, he joined the group of "Catholics for the No", opposed to the repeal of the law on divorce already in force.

However, the Italian Catholic Action remained his first love, never forgotten. In 1986, when internal conflicts with the National Presidency of ACI pushed Pope John Paul II to recall the association to a more visible commitment in the world, Carretto wrote a Letter to Peter in which he passionately defends the "religious choice" pursued by the ACI of the new Statute and its President Alberto Monticone.

Carlo Carretto died in Umbria after struggling with a sickness. He was 78 years old.

== List of works published in Italian ==
- Carlo Carretto. Letters from the Desert. Brescia, La Scuola, 1967. ISBN 978-8835065579
- Carlo Carretto. El-Abiodh - Spiritual Diary: 1954-1955. Assisi, Cittadella, 1990. ISBN 978-88-308-0205-6
- Carlo Carretto. What Matters is to love. Rome, Ave, 1995. ISBN 978-8882842499
- Carlo Carretto. And God saw that it was good. Rome, Ave, 1995. ISBN 978-8880650409
- Carlo Carretto. Small Church Family. Rome, Ave, 1996. ISBN 978-8882843618
- Carlo Carretto. In love with God. Autobiography . Assisi, Cittadella, 1997. ISBN 978-88-308-0488-3
- Carlo Carretto. Letters to Dolcidia: 1954-1983. Assisi, Cittadella, 1997. ISBN 978-8830802056
- Carlo Carretto. The God who Comes. Rome, Città Nuova, 1998. ISBN 978-88-311-4304-2
- Carlo Carretto. Love Blossoms in the Desert. Cinisello Balsamo, San Paolo, 1998. ISBN 978-8821537868
- Carlo Carretto. Blessed are You who Believed. Cinisello Balsamo, San Paolo, 1999. ISBN 978-8821518584
- Carlo Carretto. The Utopia that has the Power to Save you. Brescia, Queriniana, 1999. ISBN 978-8839919519
- Carlo Carretto. My Father I abandon myself to you. A commentary on the prayer of Charles de Foucauld. Rome, New Town, 1999. ISBN 978-8831143097
- Carlo Carretto (edited by). Stories of a Russian Pilgrim. Assisi, Cittadella, 2000. ISBN 978-8830803107
- Carlo Carretto. Why Lord? Pain: secret hidden over the centuries. Bologna, EDB, 2001. ISBN 978-8810806586
- Carlo Carretto. An Endless Journey. Assisi, Cittadella, 2002. ISBN 978-8830803879
- Carlo Carretto. Beyond Things. Assisi, Cittadella, 2003. ISBN 978-8830800052
- Carlo Carretto. I Searched and Found. My experience of God and of the Church. Assisi, Cittadella, 2003. ISBN 978-88-308-0181-3
- Carlo Carretto. I, Francis. Assisi, Cittadella, 2003. ISBN 978-88-308-0898-0 (First edition 1980 - ISBN 8870263576 )
- Carlo Carretto. The Desert in the City. Cinisello Balsamo, San Paolo, 2003. ISBN 978-88-215-4952-6
- Carlo Carretto. The Strength of Abandonment. Spiritual abbreviation of a seeker of God. Curated by Roberta Russo. Turin, Gribaudi, 2003. ISBN 978-8871527246
- Ernesto Balducci, Carlo Carretto. The Sanctity of Poor People. Cinisello Balsamo, San Paolo, 2003. ISBN 978-8821549625

== Bibliography ==
- Leonello Radi. Carlo Carretto in Spello - the foundation of the "fraternity". Presentation by Mons. Loris Francesco Capovilla, Editrice AVE, 1999.
- Gian Carlo Sibilia. A contemplative on the roads of the world. Cittadella Editrice.
- Gian Carlo Sibilia. In love with God (Paoline edition)
- Gianni Di Santo. Carlo Carretto: The Prophet of Spello (San Paolo edition) 2010.
- Alberto Chiara, Carlo Carretto: Commitment, silence, hope (Paoline edition) 2010:
- Bartolo Gariglio, Catholics from the Risorgimento to Benedict XVI. A journey from Piedmont to Italy, Morcelliana, Brescia 2013.
