= Little Sister Magdeleine of Jesus =

Venerable Magdeleine Hutin
- Born: 26 April 1898; Paris, French Third Republic
- Died: 6 November 1989 (aged 91); Rome, Italy

Madeleine Hutin, taking the name Little Sister Magdeleine of Jesus (26 April 1898 – 6 November 1989), founded a Roman Catholic community of religious sisters, the Little Sisters of Jesus, on 8 September 1939 in Touggourt, French Algeria. She was inspired by the life and writings of Charles de Foucauld (also known as Father de Foucauld or Brother Charles of Jesus).

Little Sister Magdeleine began by sharing the life of semi-nomads on the outskirts of a Saharan oasis.

Pope Francis named her as Venerable on 13 October 2021.

In 2017, Little Sisters of Jesus lived in sixty-three countries throughout the world. In late 2024, there were 900 sisters living in 45 countries, with their Generalate (Mother House) in Tre Fontane, Rome, Italy.

== Early life ==
Élisabeth Marie Magdeleine Hutin was born in Paris on 26 April 1898. Her family came from Lorraine. Magdeleine was the youngest of 6 children. Already as a young child, when on holidays with her grandmother in Seuzey, only 30 miles from the German border, she experienced the growing tensions between France and Germany. She thought of religious life from an early age and was always very attentive to those she saw to be less fortunate than herself. Through her father she learnt to have a great love for Africa and for the Arab world. As a young army doctor in Tunisia, injured in a fall from a horse, he nevertheless jeopardized both his health and his career by riding fifty kilometers to collect some serum to save the life of a small Arab child ill with diphtheria. The effort left him disabled and forced him to retire, but he never regretted what he had done.

She enrolled at a boarding school run by the Religious of the Sacred Heart, but in 1907 the French government closed all religious schools and the Sacred Heart Sisters transferred their students elsewhere. Magdeleine wound up in a boarding school in San Sebastián, Spain, and later in San Remo, Italy.

She was 16 when the 1914–1918 war broke out, and the family took refuge in Aix-en-Provence. Seuzey was destroyed by the German army and when her grandmother refused to leave her home, she was shot. Her two brothers died in the battle in 1916 and her sister died of Spanish flu. Magdeleine herself contracted pleurisy, complicated by tuberculosis.

With her father Madeleine discovered the life of Father de Foucauld written by René Bazin in 1921. Reading the life of Charles de Foucald, who died without a follower, Madeleine was convinced that God was calling her to become one of the "little sisters" that Charles de Foucauld so longed for.

Her father died suddenly and Madeleine, who was 21, could not leave her mother. She would still have to wait to be able to leave for the Sahara to follow in the footsteps of Charles de Foucauld. Meanwhile, she worked in Nantes for eight years as headmistress of the Sacred Heart Convent School. Although she suffered from deforming arthritis she was determined to pursue her goal. Any treatment she followed made no difference and in despair a specialist encouraged her to leave and go to live in a completely dry climate: "like the Sahara", he added. Never could she have dreamt of receiving such advice. She had waited 20 years to go to the Sahara. It was clear to her that God was leading her life.

== Algiers ==
She left for Algiers on 6 October 1936 with her elderly mother and Anne Cadoret, a young woman who shared her desire to go and live in the Sahara. On her arrival in Algiers, a priest asked her to help him open a social centre in Boghari, a village situated in the High Plateaux. Madeleine and her friend organized a soup kitchen and cared for the sick. They sought out the poorest nomads in the desert riding their mare Zerga. So much activity however left Madeleine dissatisfied. There was no time for prayer and recollection.

In El Golea, during a pilgrimage to the tomb of Father de Foucauld, Madeleine met there for the first time Father René Voillaume, disciple of Brother Charles, with whom she would collaborate to the end of her life. He was a founder of the Little Brothers of Jesus. Her desire for religious life never left her but it was Bishop Nouet of the Sahara who asked her if she wanted to stay in Algeria, to do a year's novitiate with the Missionary Sisters of Our Lady of Africa (White Sisters), and to become a religious. He also asked her to write the rule for the Little Sisters of Jesus.

== Foundation of Little Sisters of Jesus ==
Magdeleine made her religious profession on 8 September 1939 under the name of Little Sister Magdeleine of Jesus. Anne Cadoret made her profession on the same day, and became Little Sister Anne of Jesus.

In October Magdeleine went to live in the midst of nomads on the periphery of Touggourt, an oasis 700 km to the south of Algiers. Situated near an artesian well, Sidi Boujnan was the meeting place for the nomads of the region. For six months she lived in a tent and made friends with the nomads in the neighbouring tents. With their help, she rehabilitated an old house abandoned by the military which would become the first community house of the Little Sisters. According to Hutin, "The apostolate of friendship is really our way of mission, our way to communicate God."

With the outbreak of World War II, Little Sister Magdeleine returned to Europe. She traveled throughout France, giving more than 600 conferences to speak of the message of Charles de Foucauld, to make known this new form of religious life lived in Muslim lands, and to seek funds for the construction of the house in Sidi Boujnan. Soon other young women were interested in joining the Congregation and in August, 1941, the first novices moved into a house called "the Tubet" near Aix-en-Provence. In 1944 Magdeleine was nearly executed in Grenoble by French military who mistook her for a spy disguised as a religious. As a recompense they gave her passage in a military plane to Rome. She attended a private audience with Pius XII there, who confirmed her intuitions and encouraged her for the future.

In 1945 she returned to Touggourt. Building and repair work on the house continued. Magdeleine wrote ‘the Green Booklet’ describing the way of life of the Little Sisters. A chapter on the Infant Jesus of the Manger and the Virgin Mary, his Mother, was added in 1951. She renewed contact and confided in Father Voillaume for the formation of the Little Sisters and established a foundation of the community for formation at El Abiodh, Algeria, near the community of the Little Brothers. Charles de Provenchères was named Bishop of Aix-en-Provence and he gave all his support to this new form of religious life.

== 1946–1952 Development of the community ==
In 1946 the community received recognition of the Little Sisters of Jesus as a diocesan Congregation. The Sisters also did unskilled jobs to share in the working conditions of ordinary people and to support themselves financially. Inspired by Charles de Foucauld, the sisters live a life of simplicity and contemplative prayer as they serve among the very poor. Members of the congregation began to become involved in outside paid jobs: In 1946 two Little sisters were employed at Zenith light bulb factory in Aix-en-Provence. In 1947 Little sister Magdeleine worked in a pharmaceutical factory making tablets in Marseilles and, in 1947 in Algiers, in a metal box factory.

1948 foundations were established in the Middle East, inspired by her search to be among Arab Christians and enable the Communities to belong to the different Oriental Rites. In Jerusalem, the sisters write icons to support themselves. "Our mission here, as everywhere, can be summed up in three words: prayer, communal and work life, friendship with people."

In 1949 she made a pilgrimage to Béni Abbès with four Little sisters where they met Mohammed, Charles de Foucauld's companion, who looked after the hermitage of Charles de Foucauld. Bishop Provenchères encouraged Magdeleine's plans to become: a worker among workers, a gypsy among gypsies, by a sharing of life through friendship. In Bethlehem, Little sister Jeanne accepted to become General Sister in charge. Magdeleine remained foundress and mother and was free to continue to prepare future foundations.

In 1950 she made a pilgrimage to Tamanrasset, Hoggar, where Charles de Foucauld had lived and to the hermitage at Assekrem. The first tent community was established in El Abiodh. She also journeyed across the desert to the Camerouns, to prepare future foundations.

=== Expansion ===
In 1951 a foundation was made in a poor district of Rome. In Rome the congregation ministers to circus and carnival workers. Other communities in Switzerland, Brazil, Morocco, Central Africa, India and Indochina followed. By 1953 there were 100 communities with 300 Little Sisters.

Communities were established in Niger, the Camerouns, East Africa, South Africa and West Africa; also in South America and Mexico. On towards Martinique, Cuba, and Haiti. In 1952, with the support of Bishop Francis Gleeson, apostolic vicar of Alaska, Hutin established a community in Nome, Alaska. In London, they are part of the Hoxton parish in Hackney, where they take ordinary jobs to pay the rent.

In 1956 Magdeleine crossed into Yugoslavia in her van "the Shooting Star". Communities were set up in Poland. When on the roads of Eastern Europe she would carry her work on the Constitutions, wrapped in a red scarf which she called ‘the Mother House’.

=== 1956–1959 Tre Fontane ===
1956 Don Sortais, the General of the Trappists of Tre Fontane, Rome, welcomed the Little Sisters to build what would become their Generalate. Seminarians from the Roman Colleges helped with the work.

== 1960 The Apostolic Visit ==
Throughout 1960, an Apostolic Visitor closely examined the progress of the congregation. The visit ended in 1961, on the first day of the week of prayer for Christian unity. Little Sister Magdeleine was confirmed in her role as foundress and mother of the Little Sisters.

== 1962–1965 The General house in Rome ==
The Second Vatican Council brought bishops from all over the world together and many visited Tre Fontane.

1964 The Little Sisters of Jesus were recognized as being of Pontifical right and Tre Fontane became officially the Generalate.

Opening of a house for parents of the Little Sisters in Tre Fontane.

== 1964–1972 projects ==
1964 In Soviet Russia for the first time

Creation of special groups of communities: among nomads, fairground workers, gypsies, in circuses also among the sick, prisoners and victims of prostitution and drugs.

1967 Touggourt, returning to North Africa after many years to see friends of the foundation days in El Abiodh and Touggourt.

1967 El Golea, on pilgrimage to the tomb of Charles de Foucauld.

1971 Decision to open the community to welcome women from other Churches.

1971 Project for a community among "the hippies".

1972 Little Sister Magdeleine visited Ireland and England.

== 1972–1980 special visits to Tre Fontane ==
1973 Paul VI's surprise visit to Tre Fontane.

1971 Welcome of The Salvation Army.

1972 Brother Roger of the Taizé Community.

1972 Jean Vanier and pilgrims from L'Arche.

1974 Don Helder Camara of Brazil.

1975 Mother Teresa of Calcutta.

1977 Cardinal Can of Hanoi.

1978 Metropolitan Nikodim of Leningrad.

== 1979–1988 last years ==
1979 Journey to the People's Republic of China.

1980 Visit of Metropolitan Batholomew, the present Patriarch of Constantinople.

1984 Death of Bishop de Provenchères in the Tubet.

1985 John Paul II visited as pope. He had visited many times when bishop.

1988 Definitive approval of the Constitutions

1989 Chiara Lubich, who founded the Focolare Movement, visited Tre Fontane.

1989 Last visit to Russia three months before her death. Meeting with Fr Alexander Men from Russia in Moscow.

1989 Celebration of the Fifty Years Anniversary since the Foundation of the Little Sisters of Jesus in the Tubet.

== 1989 Little Sister Magdeleine's death ==
Little Sister Magdeleine died on 6 November 1989 at Tre Fontane, Rome. She died in the little room prepared for young people travelling the roads. Her funeral and farewell Mass took place in Tre Fontane on the 10 November 1989.

== Sources ==
- Little Sister Magdeleine of Jesus (1981). He took me by the hand: The Little Sisters of Jesus following in the footsteps of Charles de Foucauld, New City.
- Kathryn Spink (1993). The Call of the desert: A Biography of Little Sister Magdeleine of Jesus, Darton Longman & Todd.
- Daiker, Angelika (2010). Beyond Borders : Life and Spirituality of Little Sister Magdalene, Makati City : St. Pauls, ISBN 978-971-004-072-8.
- Little Sister Annie of Jesus, Preface by Jean Vanier (2010) Little Sister Magdeleine of Jesus: Message of Bethlehem to a Suffering World Claretian Publications. Original in French, translated by Little Sisters of Jesus. ISBN 81-89851-48-9 No. of pages: 223.
