= Little Brothers of Jesus Caritas =

Religious congregation of the Catholic Church

- Italian: Piccoli Fratelli di Jesus Caritas
- Abbreviation: jc
- Formation: 1969 (57 years ago)
- Founder: Gian Carlo Sibilia jc
- Headquarters: Spello, Italy
- Prior: Paolo Maria Barducci jc
- Key people: Carlo Carretto PFE
- Parent organization: Catholic Church
- Website: jesuscaritas.it

The Little Brothers of Jesus Caritas (Italian: Piccoli Fratelli di Jesus Caritas; abbreviated and stylised jc) are a male religious congregation of the Catholic Church. They follow the life and inspiration of Saint Charles de Foucauld.

== History ==
The Little Brothers of Jesus Caritas were officially recognised in 1969 by the Bishop of Foligno. It was founded under the leadership of Gian Carlo Sibilia, who was mentored and guided by Carlo Carretto, himself a member of the Little Brothers of the Gospel.

In 1979, the use of Sassovivo Abbey was handed over to the congregation.

At Carretto's death in 1988, he willed his archive to the custody of the congregation, and it is presently kept at Sassovivo Abbey.

On 21 July 2017, the congregation elected Paolo Maria Barducci to succeed Sibilia as prior of the congregation.

On 31 July 2017, Gabriele Faraghini, a priest of the congregation, was appointed by Pope Francis as rector of the Pontifical Roman Major Seminary.

== Organisation ==
=== Locations ===
The Little Brothers of Jesus Caritas have three houses:

- Spello, Italy — mother house of the congregation
- Sassovivo, Italy — in a former Benedictine abbey
- Nazareth, Israel — in a house once owned by Charles de Foucauld

From 1990 to July 2021, the congregation also resided in the Abbey of San Guglielmo al Goleto.

=== List of priors ===
- 1969–2017: Gian Carlo Sibilia
- 2017–present: Paolo Maria Barducci

== Activity ==
The daily routine of the Little Brothers of Jesus Caritas includes Mass and the Liturgy of the Hours, as well as manual labour and providing pastoral services to parishes. They also host retreatants that temporarily live with the community.

The congregation typically lives in small communities.

The congregation also publishes a periodical titled Jesus Caritas.

== See also ==
- Little Brothers of Jesus
- Little Brothers of the Gospel
