= Andreas Knapp =

Andreas Knapp PFE (born 1958 in Hettingen) is a German priest, poet, factory worker, and prior of the Little Brothers of the Gospel.

== Priestly formation ==
Knapp studied Catholic theology and philosophy in Freiburg and Rome; in 1983 he was ordained priest for the diocese of Freiburg. In 1988 he received his doctorate from the Pontifical Gregorian University with a dissertation on the concept of man in sociobiology; the dissertation was published as a monograph shortly thereafter. Knapp's thesis was received internationally and recommended for anyone seeking an overview of the sociobiological debate.

In the year he received his doctorate, Knapp was assigned as pastor of the Catholic community at Freiburg University. In 1993 he became rector of Freiburg's diocesan seminary. He resigned thereafter to join the Little Brothers of the Gospel, a religious institute inspired by Charles de Foucauld.

Since 2005, Knapp has lived with three confreres in a prefabricated housing estate in Leipzig-Grünau. The neighborhood is considered secularized, and 85 percent of the inhabitants do not practice any religion.

== Poet ==
Knapp has become nationally known as a lyricist and spiritual writer. His poetry takes up themes such as prosaic, sobering environments in a working-class milieu. Not infrequently, his work is marked by a biblical or liturgical tone, as well as by nature mysticism. Being primarily devoted to the service of the poor, his texts emerge as postscripts and reflections.

His literary work has received numerous awards, including the Herbert Haag Prize (2018), a gold medal at the Independent Publisher Book Awards (USA 2018) and a silver medal at the Benjamin Franklin Awards (USA 2018). He has co-authored books with German bestselling author and Catholic sister Melanie Wolfers SDS.

== Books (selection) ==
- Tiefer als das Meer. Gedichte zum Glauben. Würzburg: Echter 2006, second edition 2012.
- Heller als Licht. Biblische Gedichte. Würzburg: Echter, 2014.
- Beim Anblick eines Grashalms. Naturgedichte. Würzburg: Echter, 2017.
- Ganz knapp. Gedichte an der Schwelle zu Gott. Würzburg: Echter, 2020.
