= René Voillaume =

French Catholic priest (1905–2003)

René Voillaume PFJ (born 19 July 1905 in Versailles; died 13 May 2003 in Aix-en-Provence) was a French Catholic priest, theologian and founder of the Little Brothers of Jesus in 1933, the Little Brothers of the Gospel in 1956, and the Little Sisters of the Gospel in 1963. His spirituality is inspired by the life and writings of saint Charles de Foucauld.

At sixteen, Voillaume read a biography of Charles de Foucauld by René Bazin which changed his life. In 1923 he entered the Seminary of Saint Sulpice in Issy les Moulineaux near Paris and studied philosophy for two years before joining the White Fathers at Maison Carree, Algiers.

He was ordained a priest on June 29, 1929; he then studied a doctorate in theology under the direction of Fr. Reginald Garrigou-Lagrange for two years.

In 1933, by then a priest, he and four companions went to live in Algerian Sahara (then a French colony) in El Abiodh Sidi Cheikh oasis. This experience was the genesis of the Little Brothers of Jesus. "Little we are before the task we have to accomplish. Little we shall be in the eyes of men also. All our lives we shall remain unprofitable servants, and we must wish to be so dealt with."

In 1952 he founded, along with Marguerite Poncet, the fraternity Jesus Caritas, a secular women's institute present today on five continents. He also helped Magdeleine of Jesus in the consolidation of the Little Sisters of Jesus and celebrated her funeral in November 1989 in Rome.

Voillaume was also the author of Contemplation today, in which he wrote: "All the great Christian contemplatives are unanimous in their testimony: whatever the spiritual path, union with God is perceived by them as real, a more existential reality, more solid, more full of being and certainty than any other experience of the physical world. In this sense, it is true to say that contemplatives are the most realistic of men."

== Family ==
His sister Marguerite became a White Sister in 1921.

== Writings ==
- Retraite au Vatican, Paris, Fayard, 1969, 277 p.
- Concerning Religious Life, Darton, Longman & Todd Ltd, 1975.
- Mitten in der Welt. Charles de Foucauld und seine Kleinen Brüder., Freiburg, Herder Verlag, 1960.
- The Need for Contemplation, Darton, Longman & Todd Ltd, 1972.
- Faith and Contemplation, Darton, Longman & Todd Ltd, 1974.
- Christian Vocation, Darton, Longman & Todd Ltd, 1973.
- Living God, Darton, Longman & Todd Ltd, 1980.
- La Contemplation aujourd'hui, Paris, Foi vivante, 1979.
- Brothers of Men, Darton, Longman & Todd Ltd, 1966.
- Silent pilgrimage to God: The spirituality of Charles de Foucauld, Orbis Books, 1975
- The Truth Will Make You Free: Letters to the Little Brothers
- L'Éternel vivant, Le Cerf, 1978
- Source of Life: Eucharist and Christian Living, Darton, Longman & Todd Ltd, 1976
- Au cœur des masses : La vie religieuse des Petits Frères du père de Foucauld., éditions du Cerf, 1952
- Follow Me: The Call to the Religious Life Today, Darton, Longman and Todd, 1978
- À la suite de Jésus, Les Éditions du Cerf, 1965
- Truth Will Make You Free, Darton, Longman & Todd Ltd, 1976
- Zeugnis für Christus in Armut, Freiburg, Herder Verlag, 1964
- Botschaft vom Wege. Briefe weltnaher Bruderliebe., Freiburg, Herder Verlag, 1962
- Pregare per vivere, San Paolo Edizioni, 2007
