= Carlos Armando Bustos =

Argentine member of the Order of Friars Minor Capuchin

Carlos Armando Bustos Crostelli, OFMCap (10 January 1942 – c. 1977), was an Argentine member of the Order of Friars Minor Capuchin, who became a victim of that nation's dirty war during the 1970s. He was arrested on the street by members of the police force on 9 April 1977, and was never seen again.

== Early life ==
Bustos was born in Córdoba, Argentina, 10 January 1942. He entered the Franciscan novitiate on 3 March 1961 and was professed as a Capuchin friar the following year. Friar Carlos was ordained a Catholic priest at St. Mary of the Angels the on 2 May 1970. After that, along with another friar named Pedro, he went to live in the “Ciudad Oculta” sector of Villa Lugano, within Buenos Aires.

== Priest and activist ==
Experiencing the life of the severely poor of the city drew Bustos to seek a deeper identification with the people among whom he lived. While maintaining a joyful demeanor, playing on his guitar and cheering his colleagues with his jokes, he began to find that the work he was doing to help the poor was starting to bring him into conflict with the government then in power in Argentina. This was drawing him into a close collaboration with a small community of Little Brothers of the Gospel, a semi-contemplative religious order dedicated to sharing the lives of the poorest of the earth. His collaboration with Little Brother Patrick Rice, a native of Ireland, led him to start considering a transfer from the Capuchins to that congregation. To support himself, as well as sharing in the daily life of a working person, he started driving a taxi. He was also in close touch with the Movement of Priests for the Third World. These were dangerous connections to have in Argentina under the right wing military government.

The summer of 1976 saw the widespread killing of members of the Catholic clergy and religious orders throughout Argentina, as the government attempted to consolidate its power and crack down on dissent. On 4 July, a small community of members of the Pallotine Congregation were murdered in their church, followed a month later by the mysterious death of the Bishop of La Rioja, Enrique Angelelli. This wave of death of the clergy and lay leaders in the Church led Bustos to begin criticizing the government publicly for its campaign against the Church.

Bustos was part of a team of members of the clergy who went to La Rioja to investigate the bishop's death. In September 1976, he was among the members who released a document accusing the government of Angelelli's death as part of a campaign against the Catholic Church for its commitment to working with the poor. The document gained international attention. Early the following year, he met with his bishop, Cardinal Raúl Francisco Primatesta, who was also the President of the Bishops' Conference of Argentina, and was known to have close ties to the leaders of the military junta then ruling the country. He was seeking the cardinal's help in stopping the attacks on those priests and other members of the Church who were engaged in work for the poor. The cardinal was noncommittal.

== Disappearance ==
On 8 April 1977, Bustos was returning home after participating in services at the Church of the Rosary of Nueva Pompeya for Holy Thursday, the start of the Easter observances. He was stopped on the street by the police and arrested. It was later learned that he was then taken to a secret detention center, known as the "Athletic Club" (Spanish: Club Atlético), where he was tortured and interrogated. Nothing more was ever learned of his fate. Repeated requests by family members and the Capuchin friars brought no response from the military or government officials.
