= Mouha Oulhoussein Achiban =

Moroccan singer and dancer (1916-2016)

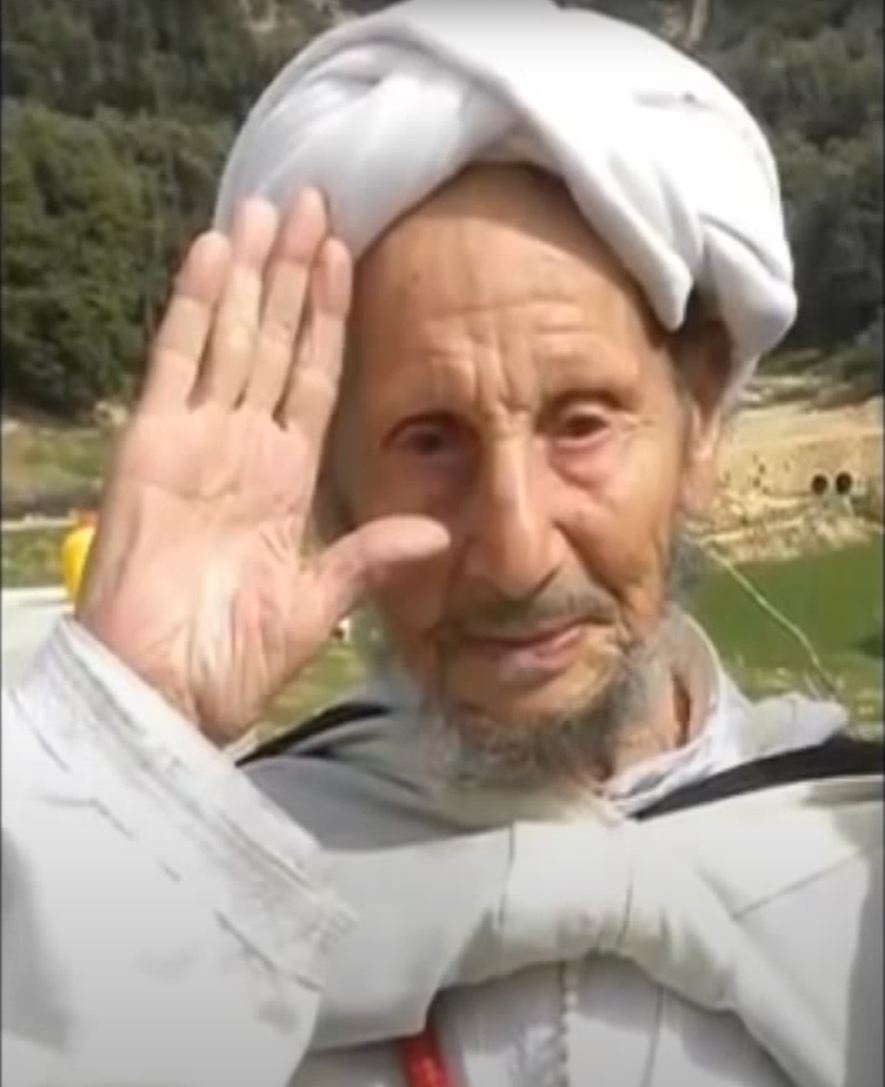
- Born: 1916; El Kbab
- Died: 19 February 2016 (aged 99–100); El Kbab
- Other names: Maestro
- Occupations: Dancer; singer; maestro
- Notable work: Ahidous Maestro

Mouha Oulhoussein Achiban (1916 – 19 February 2016), also referred to as Oulhoucine or Oulhouceine, was a Moroccan Amazigh singer and dancer born in El Kbab in 1916 and died on 19 February 2016 in El Kbab.

== Biography ==
Mouha Oulhoussein Achiban was born in a small village in Azrou and started his career in the early 1950s. After years of experience, he became one of the most known figures both in Morocco and internationally. He participated in several festivals in Africa, Europe and the United States, helping spread the Berber musical art of Ahidous. The U.S. president Reagan gave him the title of "the maestro" which followed him until his death in 2016.
