= Albert Peyriguère =

20th-century French priest, hermit and ethnologist

Father Albert Peyriguère
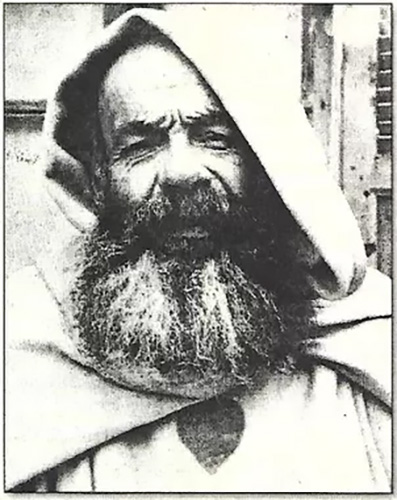
- Born: Jean-Marie Peyriguère; September 28, 1883; Trébons, France
- Died: April 26, 1959 (aged 75); Casablanca
- Burial place: Priory of Our Lady of Atlas
- Citizenship: French
- Occupation: Hermit

Ecclesiastical career
- Church: Roman Catholic Church
- Ordained: 8 December 1906

Albert Peyriguère (Trébons, 28 September 1883 – Casablanca, 26 April 1959) was a Catholic priest, hermit and ethnologist from Southern France. Following the example of Charles de Foucauld, he lived as a hermit in the Atlas mountains in Morocco. While the care for the local Berber population earned him their admiration, he became an expert on Berber languages and their culture.

== Biography ==
=== Early life ===
Albert Peyriguère was born as Jean-Marie Peyriguère on 28 September 1883 in Trébons, a small village close to Lourdes in the Hautes-Pyrénées department. His parents, Jean Peyriguère and Marie Bayle, were members of the working class and started calling him Albert at a young age. The family moved soon to Talence where Peyriguère attended school, served as an altar boy and developed a devotion to the Notre-Dame de Talence. After completing successfully school, he entered the major seminary of Bordeaux in autumn 1901 after turning 18. He was ordained priest in the chapel of the seminar on 8 December 1906, just a couple of days before the seminar was occupied by the French state according to the law on the Separation of the Churches and the State. After that, he studied in Paris and became a teacher at the newly founded Gratry school in Bordeaux.

Peyriguère was mobilised in the first days of the First World War and assigned to the 234th infantry regiment as stretcher bearer and chaplain. He was taken prisoner on 16 March 1917 and remained in Germany for seven months before being repatriated as a member of the medical service. In 1918 he was severely wounded when, carrying on his back a badly wounded soldier, a barrage of fire broke his jaw and injured his hand. After the end of the war, Peyriguère returned to minor seminary of Bordeaux but remained tired, even depressed. He felt inspired to go to Africa and desired to join the White Fathers, and asked cardinal Pierre Andrieu for authorisation to go there. Peyriguère request was taken up by the bishop of Carthage and he was assigned as chaplain to the boys school of Sillonville on the Cape Bon in 1920.

=== Life in Africa ===
In Tunesia, Peyriguère read the biography of Charles de Foucauld by René Bazin and became one of the first disciples of the hermit. As he would declare later, he saw his life mission in praying, living and putting the message of Charles de Foucauld to the test. In June 1926, he founded together with another Bordeaux native, Father Chatouville, a hermitage in Ghardaïa, but both fell ill and had to be repatriated. In July 1928, the forty-four year man settled in El Kbab, a village of then about thousand people in the middle of the Atlas mountains. There, he would live until the end of his live among a population of poor peasants in a small house, consisting of his bedroom and an oratory. Here he also set up a small dispensary from which he served the people around, occasionally also visiting tents in the surrounding area. At night, he would spend long hours in adoration of the blessed Sacrament in the oratory, aiming to imitate Christ. His vision of his apostolate among the Berbers was not to proselytise them, but according to him, "to be in their midst the presence of Christ, to love them".

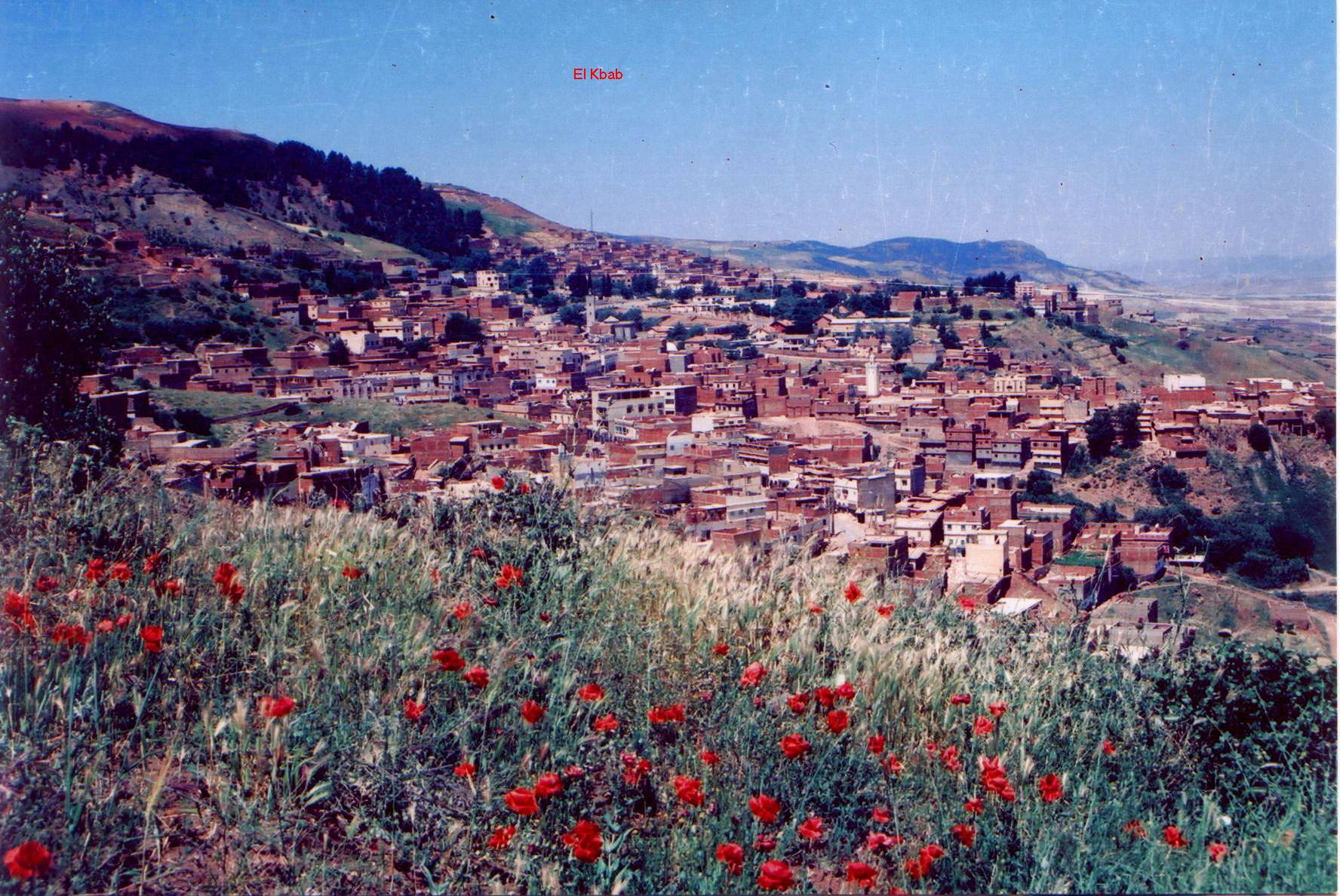
El Kbab

By 1930, his living had gained the attention of the press which often derided his efforts as fruitless. A bit later, he started publishing articles under the pseudonym "Paul Hector", his first article being entitled "Research on the true thought of Father de Foucould" which was published in Le Maroc catholique in July 1933. During the Moroccan struggle for independence, Peyriguère alerted the French public opinion and wrote many letters to officials and friends in France and Morocco of the injustices perpetrated by the French state. These activities raised suspicion with the French authorities in Morocco and general Roger Miquel, commander of the Meknes garrison, complained to the prior of Toumliline that Peyriguère had established a revolutionary mentality in El Kbab and was preaching communism. Also the threat of expulsion did not silence Father Peyriguère who aimed to follow the example of Charles de Foucauld who had denounced Saharan slavery and did not want to be considered a "mute dog".

Albert Peyriguère died on 26 April 1959 in Casablanca and was buried in El Kbab in the garden of his house. After his death, Michel Lafon succeeded him in the hermitage in El Kbab.

== Legacy ==
Albert Peyriguère was called a marabout by the local population due to his good works and care for the poor and sick. His remains are buried today in a chapel dedicated to him in the priory of Our Lady of Atlas, Midelt. The correspondence between him and a nun, whose spiritual director he was, was published in 1962 under the title "Laissez-vous saisir par le Christ" and became a huge success. The Association Albert Peyriguere, a social organisation from Tarbes, a neighbouring town of Trebons, is named after Albert Peyriguère.

== See also ==
- Charles de Foucauld

== Writing ==
- Essai de monographie psychologique berbère d'après le parler familier des tentes (under the name Paul Hector), 1933
- Laissez-vous saisir par le Christ, Ed. du Centurion, 1962
- Le Temps de Nazareth: Edition du Seuil, 1964

== Sources ==
- Boucrout, Marc (9 July 2020). Ennaji, Moha (ed.). Culture berbère (amazighe) et cultures méditerrannéeennes: Le vivre-ensemble (in French). KARTHALA Editions. pp. 195–202. ISBN 978-2-8111-2574-5.
- Chauvel, Germain; Gorrée, Georges (1 January 1968). Albert Peyriguère: Vie et spiritualité (in French). FeniXX réédition numérique. ISBN 978-2-307-08880-6.
- Gorrée, Georges (1977). "Peyriguère, Albert". Dictionary of African Christian Biography (in French).
- H., H. (1 July 1959). "Le Père Peyriguère". Études (in French). 302. Compagnie de Jésus: 122–123.
- Lafon, Michel (1986). Bibliographie d'Albert Peyriguère (in French). Presses Univ de Bordeaux. ISBN 978-2-86781-033-6.
- Lafon, Michel (20 September 2008). "Albert PEYRIGUÈRE (1883-1959)". Diocèse de Rabat (in French). Archived from the original on 20 November 2015.
- Patterson, Margot (13 June 2019). "The last monk of Tibhirine: 'God drove that history'". National Catholic Reporter.
- "Histoire et philosophie de l'Association Albert Peyriguère". Association Peyriguere (in French).
