= Melanie Wolfers =

German Roman Catholic nun (1971-)

Melanie Wolfers SDS
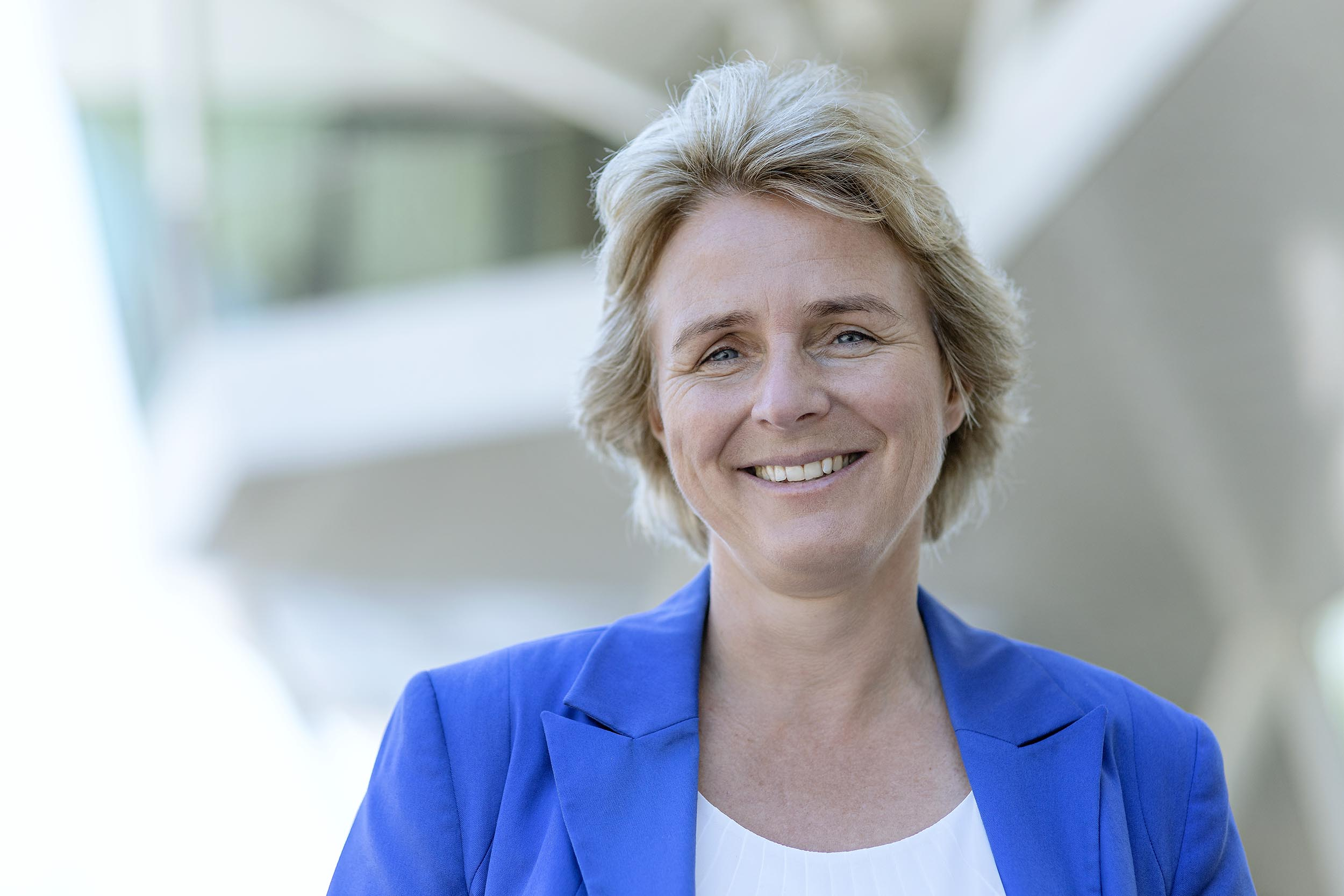

Personal life
- Born: May 23, 1971 (age 55) Flensburg, Germany

Religious life
- Religion: Christianity
- Denomination: Roman Catholicism

Melanie Wolfers (b 1971) is a German Salvatorian nun, theologian, philosopher, and media personality working in Austria. She is the author of many books, including Entscheide dich und lebe! Die Kunst eine kluge Wahl zu treffen (Make a decision and live! The art of making a wise choice, 2020), and Zuversicht. Die Kraft, die an ein Morgen glaubt (Confidence. The strength that believes in a tomorrow, 2022). In 2025 she published, with German priest Andreas Knapp, Atlas der Unbegangenen Wege: Eine Reise zu dir Selbst (Atlas of Untrodden Paths: A Journey to Your Inner Self), their second book together. She is one of the best-known German-language authors.
