= El Kbab =

El Kbab القباب
- Rural commune and Town
- Interactive map of El Kbab
- Coordinates: 32°44′N 5°31′W
- Country: Morocco
- Region: Béni Mellal-Khénifra
- Province: Khénifra Province

Population (2004)
  - Total: 8,541
- Time zone: UTC+0 (GMT)

El Kbab is a Rural commune and town in Khénifra Province, Béni Mellal-Khénifra, Morocco. According to the 2004 census it has a population of 8,541.

Father Albert Peyriguère, a French Catholic and follower of Charles de Foucauld, lived in the town between 1928 and his death in 1959. Due to his care for the poor, the local population considered him a marabout.
