= Trébons =

- Commune
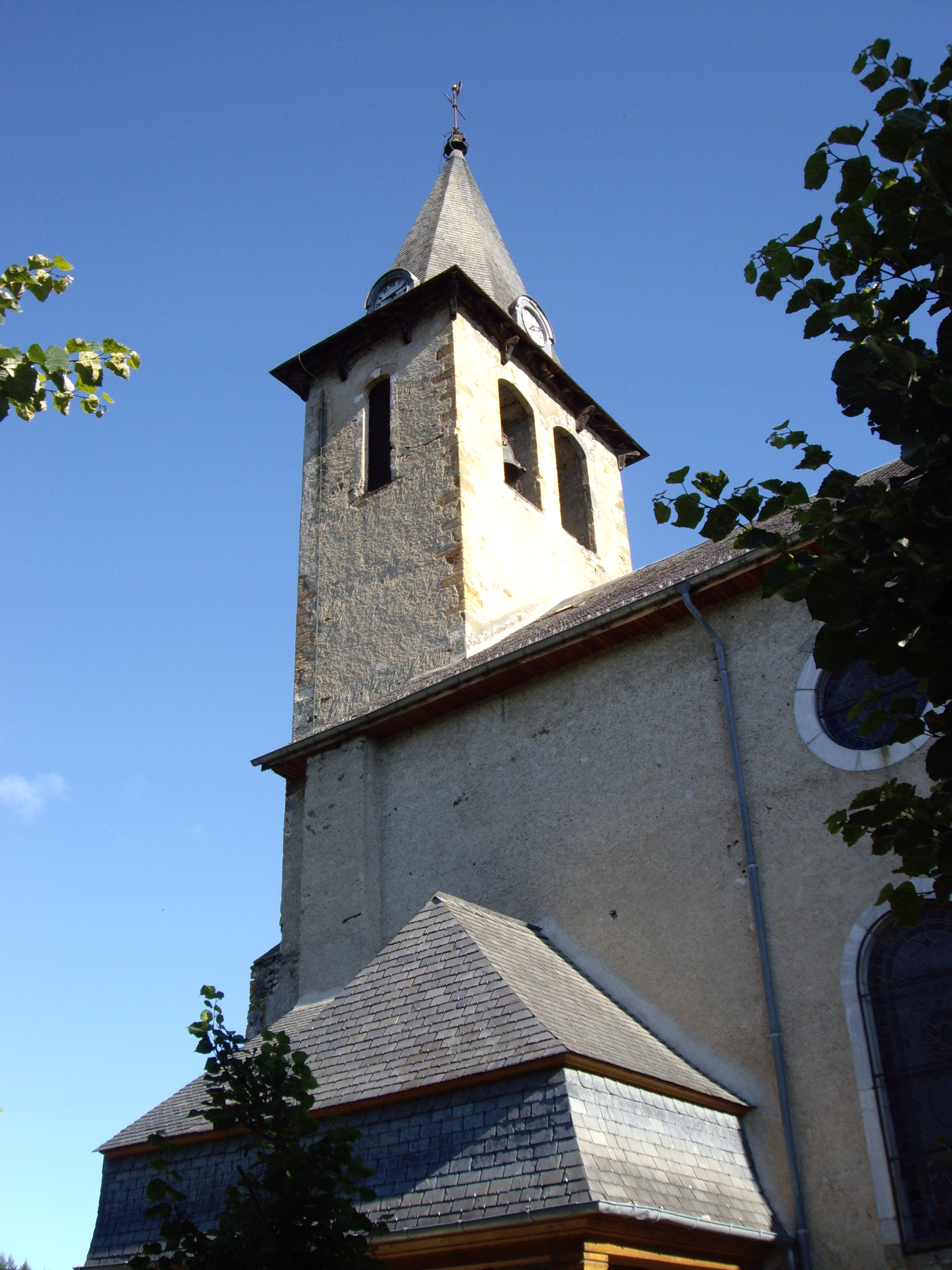
- The church of Trébons

- Coat of arms
- Location of Trébons
- Location within France Location within Occitanie
- Coordinates: 43°06′08″N 0°07′19″E
- Country: France
- Region: Occitania
- Department: Hautes-Pyrénées
- Arrondissement: Bagnères-de-Bigorre
- Canton: La Haute-Bigorre

Government
  - Mayor (2020–2026): Yves Pujo
- Area^{1}: 10.19 km^{2} (3.93 sq mi)
- Elevation: 475 m (1,558 ft)
- Highest elevation: 773 m (2,536 ft)
- Lowest elevation: 456 m (1,496 ft)
- Population (2023): 760
  - Density: 75/km^{2} (190/sq mi)
- Time zone: UTC+01:00 (CET)
  - Summer (DST): UTC+02:00 (CEST)
- INSEE/Postal code: 65451 /65200
- ^{1} French Land Register data, which excludes lakes, ponds, glaciers > 1 km^{2} (0.386 sq mi or 247 acres) and river estuaries.

Trébons (French pronunciation: [tʁebɔ̃s]; Occitan: Trebons) is a commune in the Hautes-Pyrénées department in south-western France.

== Notable people ==
- Albert Peyriguère (1883–1959), hermit and ethnologist

== See also ==
- Communes of the Hautes-Pyrénées department
