= Sassovivo Abbey =

Sassovivo Abbey Abbazia di Sassovivo
- Frazione
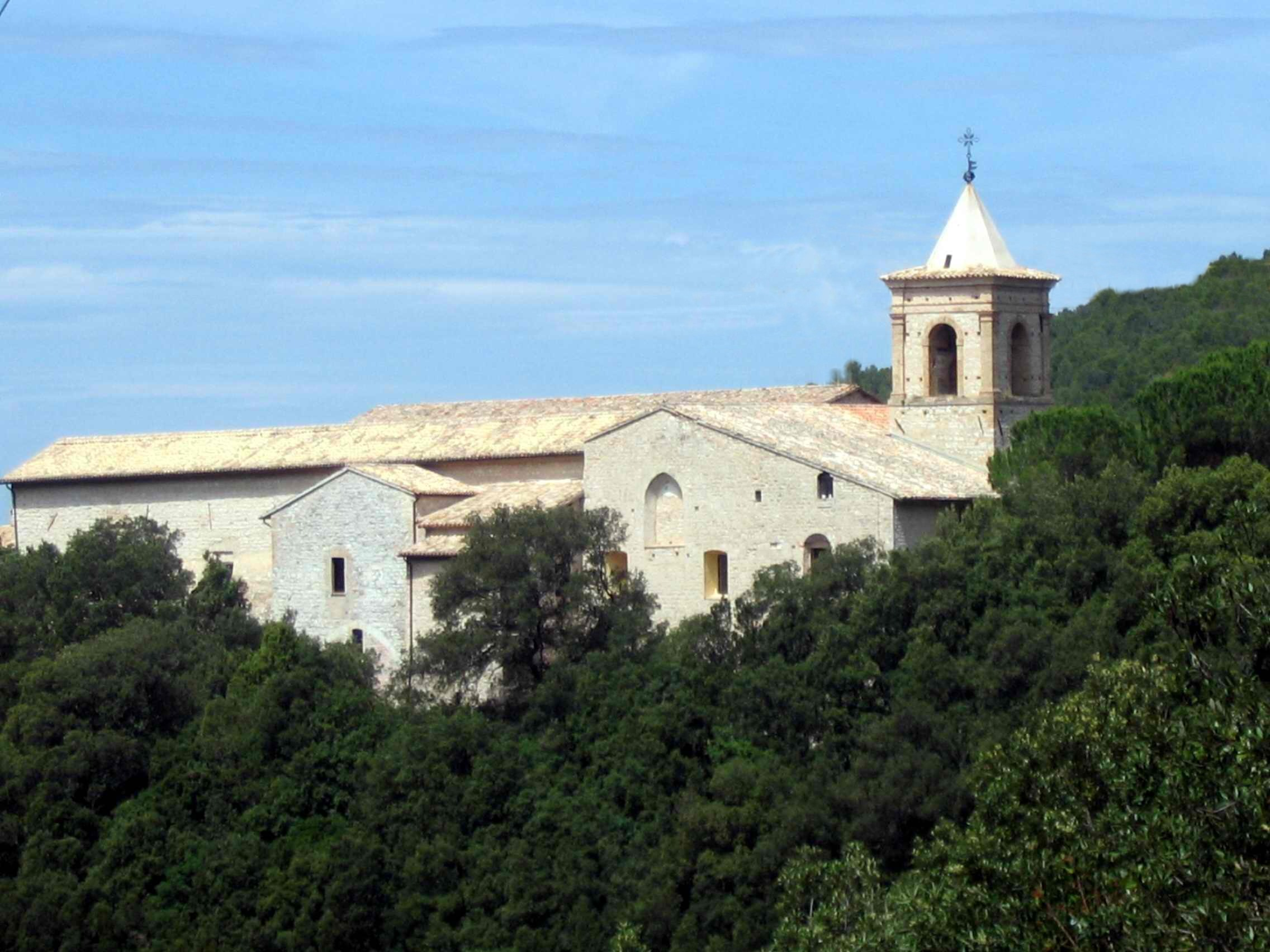
- Sassovivo Abbey

- Location within Italy
- Coordinates: 42°57′24″N 12°45′43″E
- Country: Italy
- Region: Umbria
- Province: Perugia
- Comune: Foligno
- Elevation: 565 m (1,854 ft)
- Time zone: UTC+1 (CET)
  - Summer (DST): UTC+2 (CEST)
- Postcode: 06034
- Area code: 0742

The Abbey of Sassovivo is a Benedictine monastery in Umbria in central Italy. Administratively, it is a frazione of the comune of Foligno.

== Geography ==
The abbey lies in an ancient oak wood, 6 km from Foligno. Located at an altitude of 565 m on a rocky spur at the foot of Mount Serrone, it overlooks the Valle Umbra.

== History ==
The abbey was founded by the Benedictines around 1070, probably by one Mainhard coming from Santa Maria di Sitria. The abbey was based on an existing castle of the Monaldi family, on a site probably used in ancient times by the Umbri as sanctuary.

The abbey soon increased its power and prestige thanks to numerous donations. In 1138 its possession extended from Rome (the basilica of Santi Quattro Coronati) to Perugia, Spoleto and Camerino. In the following centuries it had 97 monasteries, 41 churches and 7 hospitals. In the late 15th century the abbey passed to the Olivetan Benedictines.

The abbey started to decay from the 15th century. In the course of the Napoleonic Wars, it was partially closed and in 1860, after the fall of the Papal States, its dependencies were divided between the Italian state, the local bishopric and privates. Today, part of the Abbey belongs to the Diocese of Foligno, another part to the State and the third part to a private family.

In 1979, the Bishop of Foligno entrusted the abbey to the community of the Little Brothers of Jesus Caritas who continue to live there.

In the 1970s-1990s a substantial program of restoration was carried on. The church is still under restoration after having been damaged by an earthquake in 1997.

== Architecture ==
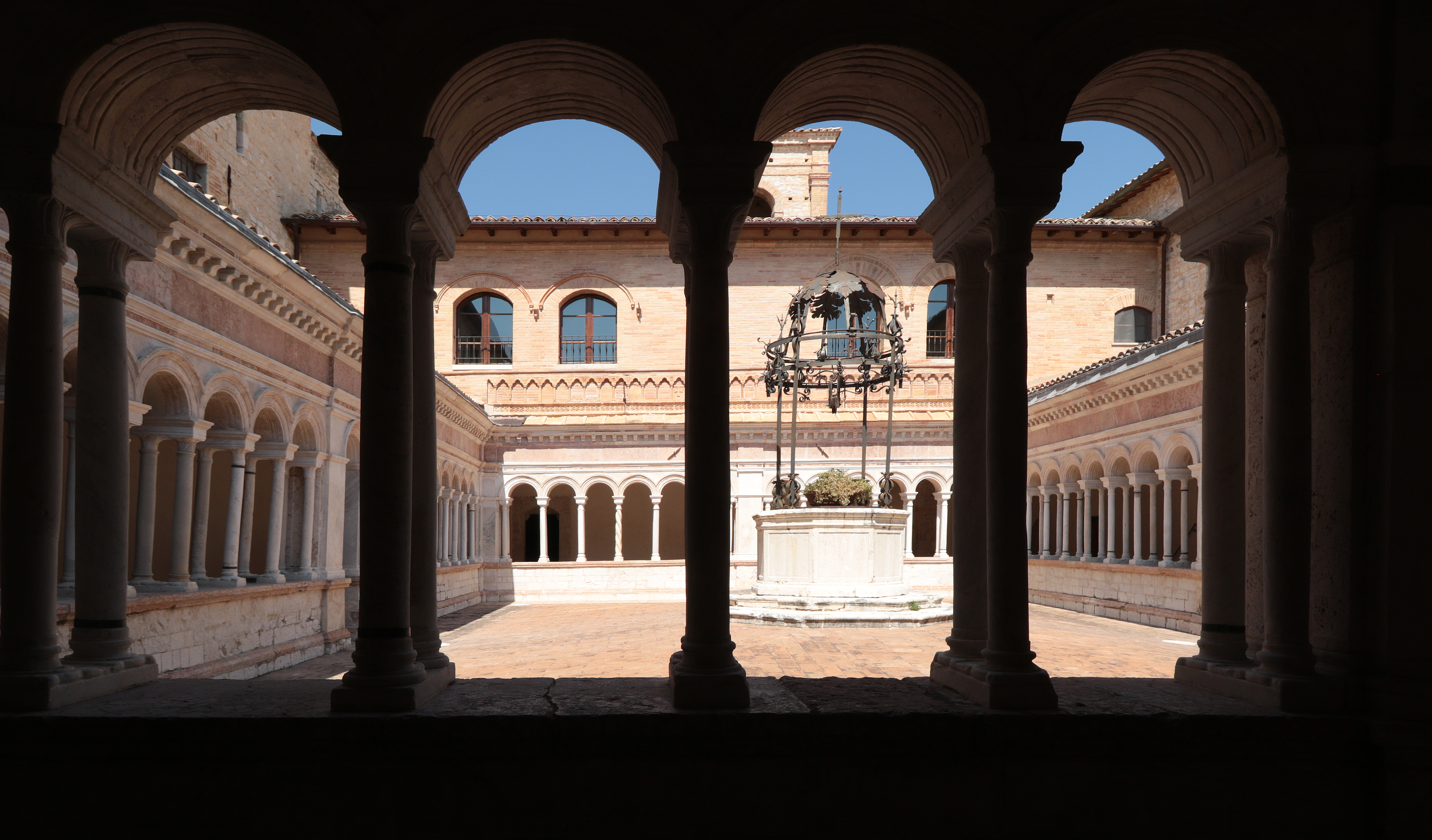
The cloister

Points of interest include:

- The Romanesque cloister (1229), commissioned by abbot Angelo and executed by the Roman stonemason Pietro de Maria. it has a rectangular plan with 58 arcades supported by a double order of 128 small helicoidal columns with capitals having lily decorations and mosaic tassels. In 1340 a large central cistern was added, followed by a pit in 1623. The cloister is also home to a fresco depicting the Virgin Enthroned with Child (14th century).
- The monastery, with a fresco of the Last Supper (1595) and the 13th century dormitories.
- Loggia del Paradiso, with fragments of 15th-century frescoes.
- Crypt of the Blessed Alano (11th century), a remain of Santa Maria in Valle, the first nucleus of the Sassovivo Abbey.
- Passeggiata dell'Abate ("Abbot's Walk"), a path within woods of oaks, junipers and Aleppo pines.
