= Little Sisters of Jesus =

Catholic religious community

- Abbreviation: LSJ (Post-nominal initials)
- Established: 1939; 87 years ago
- Founder: Madeleine Hutin
- Founded at: Touggort, French Algeria
- Type: Centralized Religious Institute of Consecrated Life of Pontifical Right (for Women)
- Headquarters: Generalate; Tre Fontane, Rome
- Region served: 45 countries in Africa, Americas, Asia, Europe and Oceania (2024)
- Members: 900 (2024)
- Mother General: Sr. Maria Chiara Ferrari, LSJ
- Motto: Jesus Caritas Latin, Jesus is love English
- Affiliations: Roman Catholic Church

The Little Sisters of Jesus are a community of Catholic religious sisters. Inspired by the life and writings of Charles de Foucauld, they were founded by Little Sister Magdeleine of Jesus (Madeleine Hutin).

== Little Sister Magdeleine of Jesus ==
Madeleine Hutin, taking the name Little Sister Magdeleine of Jesus, founded the Little Sisters of Jesus on 8 September 1939, in Touggourt, French Algeria, following the path marked out by Charles de Foucauld (also known as Father de Foucauld or Brother Charles of Jesus).

Little Sister Magdeleine began by sharing the life of semi-nomads on the outskirts of a Saharan oasis. In 2017, Little Sisters of Jesus lived in sixty-three countries throughout the world. In late 2024, there were 900 sisters living in 45 countries, with their Generalate (Mother House) in Tre Fontane, Rome, Italy.

Little Sister Magdeleine wrote:

"I felt initially that I was only being called to found a congregation of little sisters who would live as nomads in the Sahara, their lives wholly consecrated to the Islamic people. They would spend part of the year in tents in conditions of extreme poverty."

but later decided:

"I will go to the ends of the earth to say again to everyone that we must love one another and to leave behind little sisters who will say this after I have gone" (written on 31 August 1951).

== Foundation ==
On 8 September 1939, a few days after the declaration of the Second World War, Madeleine and her companion, Anne, took their first step as religious sisters. Madeleine was 41.

"Today was our profession and we are filled with joy... From now on we shall be known officially as Little Sister Magdeleine of Jesus and Little Sister Anne of Jesus. Today marks the end of the first stage of our journey and the beginning of the second. It is an important day that will always be remembered for the foundation of the Little Sisters of Jesus so that the birthday of the Blessed Virgin will mark the birth of a new religious congregation."

In October 1939 the first community was founded on the outskirts of Touggourt, Algeria, near a well where the nomads came with their animals.

In August 1940, Little Sister Magdeleine returned to France and found three quarters of her country occupied. In these difficult circumstances she gave many talks and showed a film that she had made herself of her life in Touggourt with her nomad friends:

"With this film I want to bring you joy and hope. I want to show you what faith can do with the life of one sick person. It must be a faith capable of moving mountains, incorporating the strongest belief in Brother Charles' guiding principle, 'Jesus is Lord of the impossible'"

Her message was heard by women across Europe, several of whom joined the congregation to pursue a nomadic lifestyle in service to local communities. In 1941, Little Sister Magdeleine was given a house called Le Tubet outside Aix-en-Provence to accommodate new novices and serve as an early motherhouse.

"This house is the answer to all my prayers. What a wonderful present!" noted Little Sister Magdeleine in her diary.

== Expansion ==
On 26 July 1946, whilst on pilgrimage to Sainte Baume, Little Sister Magdeleine became convinced that the Community of the Little Sisters should extend to every country. 1946 was also when some Little Sisters took jobs in factories, becoming workers among other workers.

"Four Little Sisters are starting work at the factory.. My job will be to work on the machines which are used for cutting out the cases for pharmaceutical powders – 40,000 a day, always repeating the same action... I have been appreciating the beauty of this manual work in the tradition of Jesus of Nazareth.I know that the forty workers in this room, in front of their forty machines, have a unique value and dignity so that sharing their lot in life can in no way detract from my own dignity as a member of a religious order."

In the Sahara, Little Sisters of Jesus were already nomads living alongside other nomads. Other communities lived and worked among factory and craft workers, those who worked on the land, with the sick, with shepherds, Travellers, Pygmies, fairground and circus people. Communities began in Switzerland, Brazil, Morocco, the Middle East, Central Africa, India, Vietnam... In 1951 Little Sister Magdeleine received permission to found a community in a very poor neighbourhood of Rome, Borgata Prenestina, in a temporary dwelling like that of the neighbours.

To live alongside in friendship and solidarity following Jesus of Nazareth was the key to this new vocation in the Church. Little Sister Magdeleine boldly and tenaciously defended this new form of religious life when questioned by the authorities of the Church and made three appeals to Pope Pius XII, the first in December 1944 through an intermediary, Archbishop Montini (the future Pope Paul VI), and directly in June 1947 and again in July 1948. The following is taken from her second appeal:

"The Little Sisters ask to be allowed to live as the leaven in the dough of humanity. They desire to integrate totally with other human beings, while leading a deeply contemplative life, like that of Jesus in the carpenter's shop at Nazareth and on the highways and byways of his public life.

"The Little Sisters identify wholly with the working class, but represent at the same time a bridge between all classes, races and religions. They must be a catalyst for worker and employer, Muslim and Christian, so that each learns to live with the other, loving with a greater love and doing away with all hatred and enmity.

"Their community life should be a living witness to Christian love, 'Jesus Caritas'. They will not be cloistered. Their doors will always be open, so that their communities will be a meeting ground for lay and religious who will find there deeper understanding and greater love. The Little Sisters would like to live as one with the working class, in the factories and workshops. They ask for nothing more than to be thought of as 'workers among workers', as they are 'Arabs among Arabs' and 'nomads among nomads', so that the light of Christ shines out of them, in humility and silence. In the lives of the Little Sisters we must see, from near at hand, the real face of the religious life and of the Church, the real face of Christ."

Little Sister Magdeleine valued the Church's insight and respected its authority.

"There are so many opportunities to break down barriers, that go against the rules. If we do go against them, it should be done in front of the Church, from which nothing should be disguised". (Letter to Father Voillaume, 27 April 1951).

At difficult times she never grew weary of seeking dialogue but held on to what she believed, against all odds. She wanted the sisters to be

"A witness to the Church's love for working people and for the poor, to whom Christ and the holy family belonged." (Letter to Mgr. Montini, 10th July 1948).

== World travel ==
It was in Bethlehem in 1949, at Christmas, that Little Sister Magdeleine handed over the responsibility of the community to Little Sister Jeanne, ten years after the foundation.

"We spent the day in Jerusalem and arrived in Bethlehem in the evening. We were later joined by Archbishop de Provenchères and Father Voillaume. After the official midnight Mass, the Archbishop will celebrate another Mass in the grotto at Bethlehem, assisted by Father Voillaume. At the offertory I will formally hand in my resignation as Prioress and pass the office into the hands of Little Sister Jeanne."

Little Sister Magdeleine wanted to be free and available to make new foundations, retaining her role as Foundress all her life. She undertook a tour of the world and communities were started on every continent. This led to vocations from every race and culture and rite. In 1948 there were 75 Little Sisters of Jesus living in 13 communities. By 1953 there were over 300 sisters in 100 communities.

Having already travelled to more than forty countries, in August 1953 Little Sister Magdeleine and Little Sister Jeanne undertook a last world tour, crossing the five continents in one year. They travelled across Niger, Camerouns, East Africa, South Africa, then West Africa from where they took a boat for South America and Mexico. From there they went to Martinique, Cuba and Haiti, arriving in North America and reaching Alaska and from there to Asia. They travelled through Japan, Korea, Taiwan, Hong Kong and French Indochina, going to Australia and Papua-New Guinea, continuing with newly independent Indonesia, Ceylon, India and Pakistan, even entering into Afghanistan. They finished by Iran and Turkey, returning to Aix-en-Provence on 30 August 1954.

"You should choose to live among the poorest and most forgotten, where no-one else would go, among nomads or other ignored and disregarded minorities. Look at the map of the world and see if you can find a handful of people scattered over a large territory and difficult to reach... You must really choose to go there, otherwise no-one else may ever come to tell them that Jesus loves them, that he suffered and died for them."

"The whole world calls to us through the voice of the little and the poor and all those who suffer from scorn and injustice" (Letter, 10 October 1953).

== The Cold War ==
=== Eastern Europe ===
Her passion for unity forced Little Sister Magdeleine to take a further step. As soon as she heard about a country whose frontiers were closed she wanted to go there. Believing that even an Iron Curtain could open, from 1957 onwards she began her journeys to Eastern Europe. Every year she left discreetly with a small group of Little Sisters to visit friends in the different countries behind the iron curtain. Such journeys prepared for the present-day communities in these countries. She travelled in a Citroen van, rearranged for up to four Little Sisters to live and sleep in, which she called "the Shooting star". In the front of the van, the Blessed Sacrament was reserved as it is wherever the Sisters live, even if it be a caravan, a tent or a hut.

=== Russia ===
In 1952, Little Sister Magdeleine wrote:

"When I'll have completed my task as foundress, in response to what seems to me to be a very strong inner call, if God does not put anything in my way.... I would like to leave for Russia and there give my life." (letter 15 October 1952)

In 1964 when USSR started to be more open to tourism, she began to include Soviet Russia in her travels. She often went to pray with faithful believers in Eastern Orthodox Churches. Her friendship was extended to all those she met whether believer or non-believer.

=== China ===
At 81, she visited The People's Republic of China with a group of tourists.

"I think we should have the same attitude as everywhere else: to be there [behind the Iron Curtain] as an element of kindness, gentleness, friendship, of unity above all... of having a positive outlook, not to be with those in opposition, unless it is to oppose evil and what is wrong, but never to be in opposition against people." (Letter 12 October 1956)

== Tre Fontane ==
Little Sister Magdeleine had wanted the central house to be in Rome. In 1956, a collection of wooden prefabricated houses were built on land belonging to the Trappist Fathers of Tre Fontane, near the site of the beheading of St Paul, which became the Generalate in 1964. The intent was to build a place where all of the sisters could gather and could come to prepare for final vows.

== The Second Vatican Council and ecumenism ==
The opening of the Second Vatican Council in 1962 brought many bishops to Rome (many of whom took the opportunity to visit Tre Fontane). Vatican Council II would affirm some of Little Sister Magdeleine's intuitions, above all her desire for unity between the Churches. Already in 1948 she made her first contact with Brother Roger of Taizé. She met the Patriarch Athenagoras several times and Metropolitan Bartholomew who later became Ecumenical Patriarch.

== Recognition by the Church ==
Madeleine and Anne made their first temporary vows in the diocese of Algeria with the blessing of Bishop Nouet. The Little Sisters of Jesus officially began in 1942 when Little Sister Magdeleine took final vows under the auspices of Bishop de Villerabel at Le Tubet, the Mother House, in Aix-en-Provence. In 1945 Bishop de Provenchėres was named bishop of Aix-en-Provence and he supported this new form of religious life, including its expansion among factory workers, nomads, prisoners... In 1946, following the decision to expand throughout the world, the Little Sisters of Jesus became a recognised diocesan congregation of the archdiocese of Aix-en-Provence.

After 1948, as communities of Little Sisters of Jesus were established in the Middle East, among Christians of that region, belonging to several Eastern Catholic Churches: Maronite, Syrian, Coptic, Armenian and Chaldean.

With communities established worldwide, the Little Sisters of Jesus applied for recognition as being of Pontifical Right. and as a result, throughout 1960, an Apostolic Visitor closely examined the progress of the congregation. This entailed a great struggle for Little Sister Magdeleine who was trying to reconcile her belief in obedience to the Church with her desire to be faithful to the insights she saw as fundamental to the vocation of the Little Sisters of Jesus, as the Apostolic Visitor asked her to rewrite important passages of the Constitutions.

"I do it with all my heart so as to reconcile obedience towards the Visitor with the mission which the Lord has confided to me. More and more I think there are certain points on which I will never give way: total poverty, littleness, spiritual childhood, contemplative life." (Letter, 7 April 1960).

The Little Sisters of Jesus were recognised as of being of Pontifical Right on 25 March 1964 and the Generalate was established at Tre Fontane, Rome on 31 May 1964. On that day, Little Sister Magdeleine wrote to Pope Paul VI that it was the realisation of her dream as a foundress. Both Pope Paul VI and Pope John Paul II (22 December 1985) visited the Little Sisters of Jesus at Tre Fontane. Pope Paul VI made a surprise visit on 28 September 1973 when he told them:

"I have come to give you recognition on behalf of the Church, to tell you that the Church is truly happy about your existence, about your presence, happy for you to be what you are."

Definitive approval of the Constitutions of the Little Sisters of Jesus followed in 1988.

== Last journey ==
In 1989, at the age of 91, Little Sister Magdeleine made her last journey to Eastern Europe, including Russia, where she met Fr. Alexander Men of the Russian Orthodox Church, a writer and inspirational preacher influential among the young. He was later assassinated.

== 50th anniversary celebrations ==
On 8 September 1989, the 50th anniversary of the community was celebrated. At a papal audience during the celebrations, Pope John Paul II told the Little Sisters of Jesus

"Your history is only just beginning!"

== Magdeleine's death ==
Little Sister Magdeleine died on 6 November 1989 at Tre Fontane, Rome, in a little room prepared to welcome young people travelling the roads.

Her funeral and farewell Mass, during which the Gospel was sung in Arabic, took place in the open air in Tre Fontane on 10 November 1989, the day when the Berlin Wall fell.

== Today ==
In late 2024, there were communities of Little Sisters of Jesus scattered around the world in 45 countries, with about 900 members. Some communities date from the first years of the Foundation while new communities continue to be established. A community is usually three or four Little Sisters, often from different races, nationalities and backgrounds. Living in small communities, the sisters of Jesus seek to lead a contemplative life in the midst of people. They are inspired by the thirty years Jesus spent in Nazareth and by his humble birth in Bethlehem.

They understand Nazareth not as a particular place, but as the ordinariness of peoples' lives. They share day-to-day life, living conditions, work and dreams, especially of the less privileged and of those who are on the fringes of society. Often staying in rented accommodation or where poorer people live, they take ordinary jobs or work alongside their neighbors and practice hospitality. Members often living in housing projects, inner-city neighborhoods, in rural areas as well as among nomadic people. Some work in factories or do low paid manual work others make a livelihood adopting the same lifestyle as those whose life they share. Their lifelong call is a non-professional one: by preference they seek to live among those who are inaccessible to other forms of Church ministry or whose day-to-day life is marked by division, racism, poverty or violence.

Their contemplative life is one of intercession for their neighbours and friends and for everyone, recognising that the presence of Jesus in the Eucharist (which is present in each community's home) cannot be separated from his presence among people, especially among those who are suffering. One sister living in the community's house in Kibera, Kenya, states that their mission is to "be one with the people ... [and to] go where people are".

Little Sister Magdeleine summed up the vocation of the Little Sisters of Jesus in these words:

"If I were told to define the mission of our community in a single word, I would not hesitate for a single moment to cry, 'Unity'. All our vocation can be summed up in the word, 'Unity'"

== Sources ==
- Little Sister Magdeleine of Jesus (1981). He took me by the hand: The Little Sisters of Jesus following in the footsteps of Charles de Foucauld, New City.
- Kathryn Spink (1993). The Call of the desert: A Biography of Little Sister Magdeleine of Jesus, Darton Longman & Todd
- Little Sister Magdeleine of Jesus (1945). Green Booklet: This is my Will and Testament, Little Sisters of Jesus
- Daiker, Angelika (2010). Beyond Borders : Life and Spirituality of Little Sister Magdalene, Makati City : St. Pauls, ISBN 978-971-004-072-8
