= Little Brothers of Jesus =

Catholic religious congregation inspired by Charles de Foucauld

- Latin: Institutum Parvulorum Fratrum Iesu; French: Petits Frères de Jésus
- Abbreviation: PFJ
- Formation: 1933
- Founded at: Paris, France
- Type: Religious congregation of pontifical right for men
- Headquarters: Brussels, Belgium
- Members: 155 (38 priests) (2020)
- Superior General: Rodrigo González, PFJ
- Parent organization: Catholic Church
- Website: www.charlesdefoucauld.org/en/groupe-little-brothers-of-jesus-6
- Formerly called: Little Brothers of Solitude

The Little Brothers of Jesus (Latin: Institutum Parvulorum Fratrum Iesu; French: Petits Frères de Jésus; abbreviated PFJ) is a male religious congregation within the Catholic Church of pontifical right founded on the example of Charles de Foucauld. Founded in 1933 in France, the congregation first established itself in French Algeria, North Africa.

As of 2020, the congregation had 155 members, of whom 38 were priests.

== History ==
=== Foundation ===
The congregation was founded at the Basilique du Sacré-Cœur in Montmartre, Paris, in September 1933 by five seminarians from Issy-les-Moulineaux, first taking the name of Little Brothers of Solitude; the five were: René Voillaume, Marcel Bouchet, Marc Gerin, Guy Champenois and Georges Gorree. Led by their first superior Voillaume, and with the support of scholars Louis Massignon and Louis Gardet, they left Paris to found their first 'fraternity' in the El Abiodh Sidi Cheikh District in southern Oran at the edge of the Saharan Desert; in 1936, Bishop Nouet of Algeria named it as a diocesan congregation. There they took on their present name and a religious habit of grey embroidered with a heart and an outcropped cross and modified nomadic garb. The first years were marked by tracing the intuitions of Foucauld, settling and adapting his original 'Directory' or Rules, and establishing novitiates for the first generation of their religious congregation.

=== Post World War II ===
After World War II, the members decided to move toward a greater witness outside of Algeria into the post-war world. By modifying their original monastic idea to fit new circumstances while retaining a contemplative approach to life and prayer they split into small fraternities based on the simple rule of adoration of the Eucharist and prayer in their dwellings; this was to be coupled with a life of ordinary manual labour, friendship, and solidarity with those amongst whom they lived and worked. Their traditional habit was replaced with the appropriate plain clothes to help assimilate into their work and neighborhood roles.

This revised congregation became somewhat linked to the Worker-priest movement in France at that time for the non-traditional setting of religious life apart from overt mission, religious education, pastoral service, or direct evangelization before the Second Vatican Council.

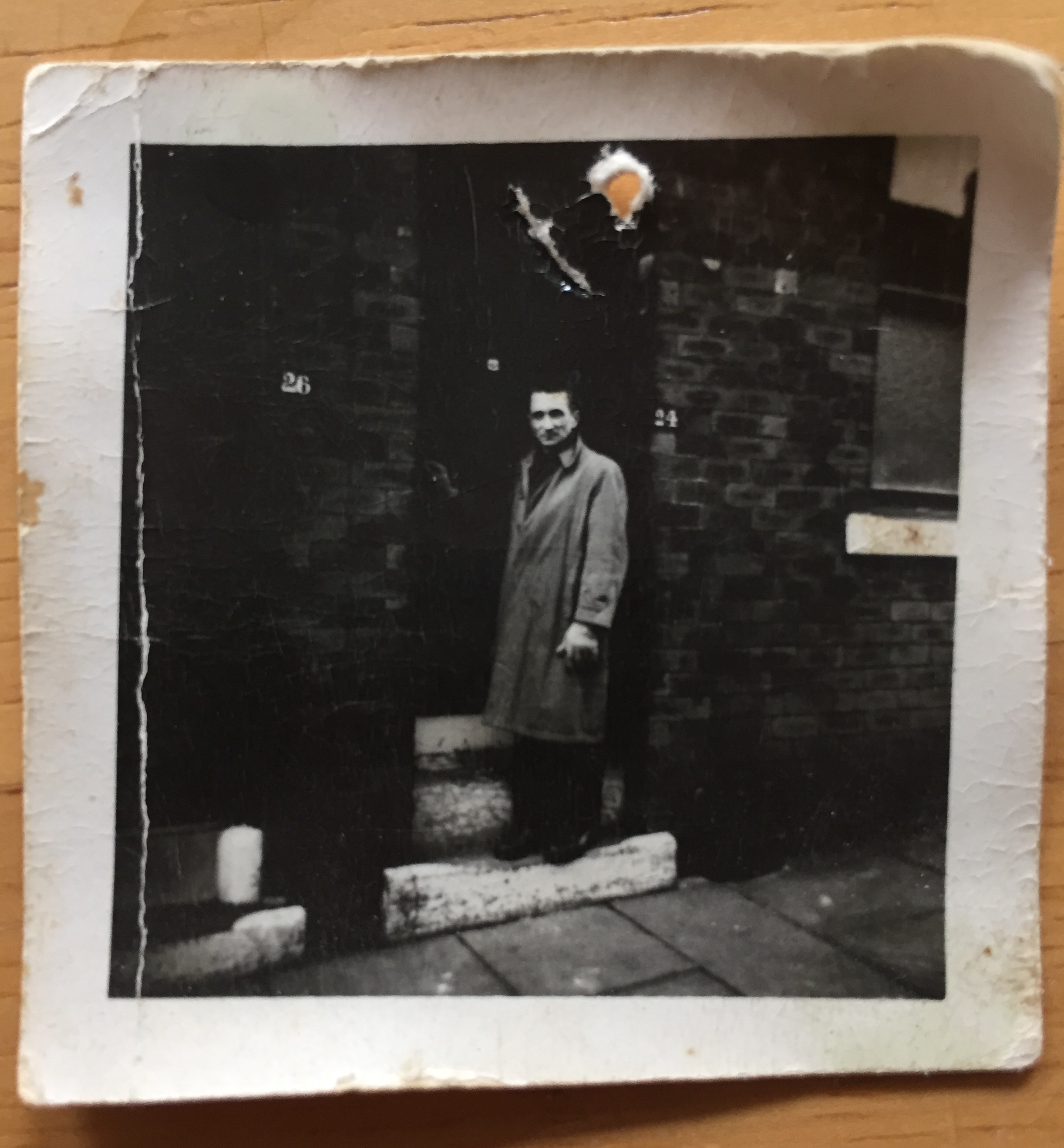
Roger Frety standing on the front steps of Autumn Groves row house apartment in Leeds (c. 1952)

In 1952, Brother Roger travelled to Leeds and became the first Little Brother in Britain; several brothers joined him.

=== Approbation ===
On 13 June 1968, the Little Brothers of Jesus were recognised by Pope Paul VI as a congregation of pontifical right. This was confirmed again in 1987 by Pope John Paul II after a revision of the community's constitutions.

== Spirituality ==
Each member of the congregation professes the vows of poverty, chastity and obedience, and undergoes a period of formation lasting several years including a postulancy which is followed by a novitiate. Afterwards, there are some years of formal study which include Christology, Sacred Scripture, Theology, Philosophy, Christian Spirituality amongst other subjects - all ongoing within a fraternal setting of daily work.

The Little Brothers of Jesus live in small communities in similar size to families known as 'fraternities'. Some members are ordained as priests to celebrate Mass for their fraternity.

== Notable members ==
- Philippe Nguyễn Kim Điền, Archbishop of Hué (Vietnam) from 1968 to 1988
- Jean-François Nothomb, member of the Comet Escape Line during World War II, later a missionary in Algeria and Venezuela.
- René Voillaume, the first superior general of the congregation

== In popular culture ==
The Little Brothers of Jesus were featured in the fourth episode of the BBC's documentary series The Long Search titled 'Rome, Leeds and the Desert'.

== See also ==
- Little Brothers of Jesus Caritas
- Little Brothers of the Gospel
- Little Sisters of Jesus

== Bibliography ==
- Charles de Foucauld, Jean-Jacques Antier, Ignatius Press, San Francisco 1999.
- Seeds of the Desert, René Voillaume, Anthony Clarke Books, 1972
- Cry the Gospel with Your Life (Dieu est Amour), Edition Le Livre Ouvert, 1994
