= René Bazin =

French novelist

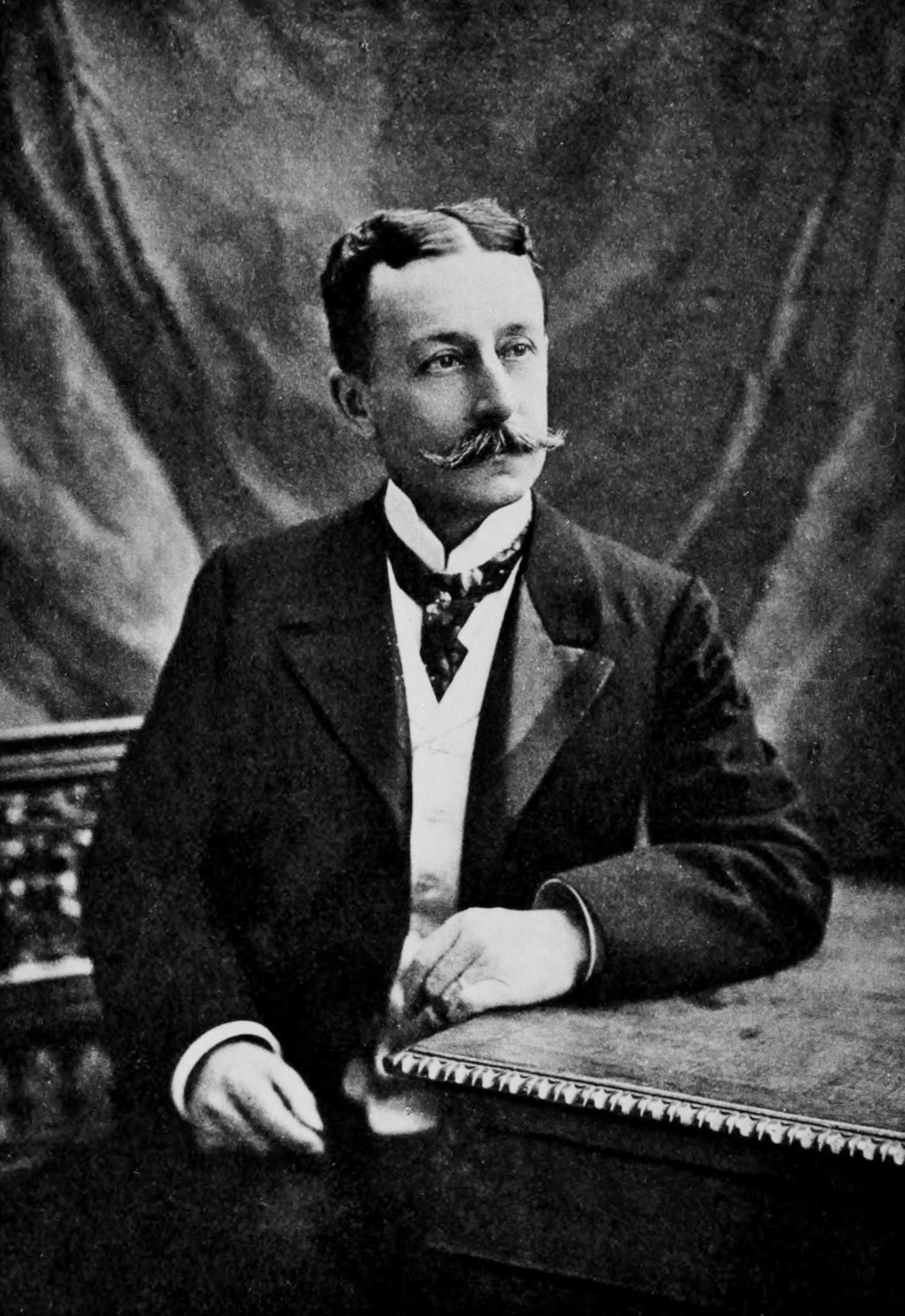
- Bazin portrait, c. 1905
- Born: René François Nicolas Marie Bazin; 26 December 1853; Angers, France
- Died: 20 July 1932 (aged 78); Paris, France
- Education: Catholic University of the West
- Spouse: Aline Bricard
- Writing career
- Pen name: Bernard Seigny
- Genre: Criminal Law
- Notable works: Une Tache d'Encre (1888), Sicile (1892), La Terre qui Meurt (1899), Les Nouveaux Oberlé (1919)
- Notable awards: Prix Vitet

René François Nicolas Marie Bazin (26 December 1853 – 20 July 1932) was a French novelist.

== Biography ==
Born at Angers, he studied law in Paris, and on his return to Angers became Professor of Law in the Catholic university. In 1876, Bazin married Aline Bricard. The couple had two sons and six daughters. He contributed to Parisian journals a series of sketches of provincial life and descriptions of travel, and wrote Stephanette (1884), but he made his reputation with Une Tache d'Encre (A Spot of Ink) (1888), which received a prize from the Academy. He was admitted to the Académie française on 28 April 1904, to replace Ernest Legouvé.

René Bazin was a Knight Commander of the Order of St. Gregory the Great, and was President of the Corporation des Publicistes Chretiens.

== Works ==
Other novels:

- Les Noëllet (1890; English tr., This, My Son, 1908)
- La Sarcelle Bleue (1892)
- Madame Corentine (1893; English tr., Those of his own Household, 1914)
- Humble Amour (1894)
- De toute son âme (1897; English tr., Redemption, 1908)
- La Terre qui Meurt (1899; English tr., Autumn Glory, 1901), a picture of the decay of peasant farming set in La Vendée; it was an indirect plea for the development of provincial France
- Les Oberlé (1901; English tr., Children of Alsace), a story which was dramatized and acted in the following year
- L'Âme Alsacienne (1903)
- Donatienne (1903)
- L'Isolée (1905; English tr., The Nun, 1908)
- Le blé qui lève (1907; English tr., The Coming Harvest, 1908)
- Mémoires d'une vieille fille (1908)
- La Barrière (1910; English tr., The Barrier)
- Davidée Birot (1912; English tr. by Mary D. Frost)
- Gingolph l'Abandonné (1914)
- La Closerie de Champsdolent (1917)
- Récits du Temps de Guerre (1919)
- Les Nouveaux Oberlé (1919), regarded as a masterpiece by some
- Le Mariage de Mlle. Gimel; La Barriére; La Douce France; Histoire de vingt quatre sonnettes; and Ferdinand Jacques Hervé Bazin (1921)
- Charles de Foucauld, Explorateur (1921; English tr., Charles de Foucauld, Hermit and Explorer, 1923)

A volume of Questions littéraires et sociales appeared in 1906. He also wrote books of travel, including a À l'aventure (1891), Sicile (1892), Terre d'Espagne (1896), and Croquis de France et d'Orient (1901). Nord-Sud Amérique, etc. (1913). Bazin is known to English and American readers for rendering the Italy of his time, The Italians of To-Day (1904).

After 1914 he published two volumes of war sketches, Pages religieuses (1915) and Aujourd'hui et demain (1916).

== Notes ==
- Chisholm, Hugh, ed. (1922). "Bazin, René" . Encyclopædia Britannica (12th ed.). London & New York: The Encyclopædia Britannica Company.
