= Little Brothers of the Gospel =

Catholic religious congregation

- French: Petits Frères de l'Évangile
- Abbreviation: PFE
- Predecessor: Little Brothers of Jesus
- Formation: 18 July 1956 (70 years ago)
- Founder: René Voillaume, PFJ
- Founded at: Camargue, France
- Headquarters: Brussels, Belgium
- Members: 71 (2008)
- Prior: Andreas Knapp, PFE
- Website: petitsfreresevangile.com

The Little Brothers of the Gospel (French: Petits Frères de l'Évangile; abbreviated PFE) are a male Catholic religious congregation of diocesan right. The movement was founded in 1956 by René Voillaume, the first superior general of the Little Brothers of Jesus, to evangelise to the poor. It is one of a group of communities founded on inspiration of Charles de Foucauld.

As of 2021, the prior of the Little Brothers of the Gospel is Andreas Knapp.

== History ==
=== Background ===
René Voillaume was a priest and one of the founding members of the Little Brothers of Jesus, which was formed in 1933, inspired by the writings of Charles de Foucauld. They first established themselves in the Saharan oasis of El Abiodh Sidi Cheik. The Little Brothers of Jesus first lived a monastic form of life, but after World War II began to set up small "fraternities" in working-class neighbourhoods. As such, Voillaume decided to create a new congregation, branched off from the Little Brothers of Jesus, with a special focus on evangelising to the poor.

=== Formation ===
On 18 July 1956, at the orders of Voillaume, the first fraternity of the Little Brothers of the Gospel was formed in Camargue, France consisting of three brothers. From 1956 to 1960, another four foundations were created in Cần Thơ, South Vietnam (1956), Bindua, Italy (1957), Jaffna, Sri Lanka (1959), and Portin Almos, Argentina (1960). The congregation was subsequently legally recognised as a religious congregation of the Little Brothers of the Gospel on 13 June 1968 by the bishop of Aix-en-Provence.

In 1973, the brothers formed a central fraternity for the congregation in Cépie, France. This was later moved to Brussels, Belgium in 1981. The constitutions of the congregation were later revised and received approbation by Cardinal Danneels, bishop of Mechelen-Brussels, on 5 January 1986.

== Activities ==
Among the declared three pillars of the congregation are:

- Prayer;
- Fraternity love;
- Sharing the life of the poor.

They are present in Europe (France, Italy, Germany, Spain, etc.), Central and South America (Mexico, Venezuela, Bolivia, etc.), and Africa (Kenya, Tanzania). Their Central Fraternity is in Brussels, Belgium. As of 2008, there were seventy-one members worldwide.

On the night of 29 to 30 July 2002, Yves Lescanne, Little Brother of the Gospel, was killed in Maroua, Cameroon.

== Notable members ==
- Carlo Carretto, author and activist
- Philippe Stevens, Bishop of Maroua-Mokolo (Cameroon) from 1994 to 2014
