= Charles de Foucauld =

French explorer, geographer, linguist and Catholic saint (1858–1916)

Saint Charles de Foucauld
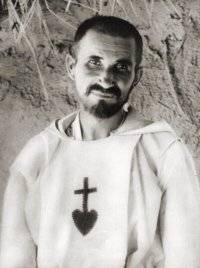
- Charles of Jesus, c. 1907

Apostle of the Sahara
- Born: 15 September 1858; Strasbourg, Second French Empire
- Died: 1 December 1916 (aged 58); Tamanrasset, French Algeria
- Venerated in: Catholic Church; Anglican Communion
- Beatified: 13 November 2005, Saint Peter's Basilica, Vatican City by Cardinal José Saraiva Martins
- Canonized: 15 May 2022, Saint Peter's Square, Vatican City by Pope Francis
- Feast: 1 December
- Attributes: white religious habit with the Sacred Heart of Jesus, crowned with a cross

Charles de Foucauld, born as Charles Eugène, vicomte de Foucauld de Pontbriand (French: [ʃaʁl də fuko]; 15 September 1858 – 1 December 1916), in religion Charles of Jesus, was a French monk, Catholic priest and hermit who lived among the Tuareg people in the Sahara in Algeria. He was also an explorer, geographer, ethnographer. Before joining the Trappists as a monk, he was a soldier in the 2nd Hussar Regiment. He was murdered by Bedouin bandits in 1916. His inspiration and writings led to the founding of a number of religious congregations inspired by his example. He was canonized in 2022.

Orphaned at the age of six, de Foucauld was brought up by his maternal grandfather, Colonel Beaudet de Morlet. He undertook officer training at the Saint-Cyr Military Academy. Upon graduating from the academy, he opted to join the cavalry. Ordained in Viviers in 1901, he decided to settle in the Algerian Sahara at Béni Abbès. His ambition was to form a new congregation, but nobody joined him. Taking the religious name Charles of Jesus, he later moved to Tamanghasset and lived with the Berbers, adopting a new apostolic approach, preaching not through sermons, but through his example.

On 1 December 1916, de Foucauld was killed by a bandit at his hermitage. He was quickly considered to be a martyr of faith and was the object of veneration following the success of the biography written by René Bazin. The foundation of newer religious congregations, spiritual families, and a renewal of eremitic life are inspired by Charles de Foucauld's life and writings. His beatification process started in 1927, eleven years after his death. He was declared venerable on 24 April 2001 by Pope John Paul II, then beatified on 13 November 2005 by Pope Benedict XVI. On 27 May 2020, the Vatican announced that a miracle had been attributed to de Foucauld's intercession. De Foucauld was canonized by Pope Francis on 15 May 2022.

== Biography ==
=== Childhood ===
De Foucauld's family was originally from the Périgord region of France and part of the old French nobility; their motto being Jamais arrière ("Never behind"). Several of his ancestors took part in the crusades, a source of prestige within the French nobility. His great-great-uncle, Armand de Foucauld de Pontbriand, a vicar general and first cousin of the archbishop of Arles, Monseigneur Jean Marie du Lau d'Allemans, as well as the archbishop himself, were victims of the September massacres that took place during the French Revolution. His mother, Élisabeth de Morlet, was from the Lorraine aristocracy whilst his grandfather had made a fortune during the revolution as a republican. Élisabeth de Morlet married the viscount Édouard de Foucauld de Pontbriand, a forest inspector, in 1855.

On 17 July 1857, their first child, Charles, was born and died one month later. Their second son, whom they named Charles Eugène, was born in Strasbourg on 15 September 1858 in the family house on Place Broglie at what was previously mayor Dietrich's mansion, where La Marseillaise was sung for the first time, in 1792.

A few months after his birth, his father was transferred to Wissembourg. In 1861, Charles was three and a half years old when his sister, Marie-Inès-Rodolphine, was born. His profoundly religious mother educated him in the Catholic faith, steeped in acts of devotion and piety. She died following a miscarriage on 13 March 1864, followed by her husband, who suffered from neurasthenia, on 9 August. The now orphaned Charles (age 6) and his sister Marie (age 3) were put in the care of their paternal grandmother, Viscountess Clothilde de Foucauld, who died of a heart attack shortly afterwards.

The children were then taken in by their maternal grandparents, Colonel Beaudet de Morlet and his wife, who lived in Strasbourg. De Morlet, an alumnus of the École Polytechnique and engineering officer, provided his grandchildren with an affectionate upbringing. Charles wrote of him: "My grandfather whose beautiful intelligence I admired, whose infinite tenderness surrounded my childhood and youth with an atmosphere of love, the warmth of which I still feel emotionally."

Charles pursued his studies at the Saint-Arbogast episcopal school and went to Strasbourg high school in 1868. At the time, an introvert and short-tempered, he was often ill and pursued his education thanks to private tuition.

He spent the summer of 1868 with his aunt, Inès Moitessier, who felt responsible for her nephew. Her daughter, Marie Moitessier (later Marie de Bondy), eight years older than Charles, became fast friends with him. She was a fervent churchgoer who was very close to Charles, sometimes acting as a maternal figure for him.

In 1870, the de Morlet family fled the Franco-Prussian War and found refuge in Bern, Switzerland. Following the French defeat, the family moved to Nancy in October 1871. Charles had four years of secular highschool left. Jules Duvaux was a teacher of his, and he bonded with fellow student Gabriel Tourdes. Both students had a passion for classical literature, and Gabriel remained, according to Charles, one of the "two incomparable friends" of his life. His education in a secular school developed nurtured patriotic sentiment, alongside a mistrust for the German Empire. His First Communion took place on 28 April 1872, and his confirmation at the hands of Monseigneur Joseph-Alfred Foulon in Nancy followed shortly thereafter.

In October 1873, when he was 15, whilst in a Rhetoric class, he began to distance himself from the faith before becoming agnostic. He later affirmed, "The philosophers are all in discord. I spent twelve years not denying and believing nothing, despairing of the truth, not even believing in God. No proof to me seemed evident." This loss of the faith was accompanied by uneasiness; Charles found himself to be "all selfishness, all impiousness, all evil desire, I was as though distraught".

On 11 April 1874, his cousin Marie married Olivier de Bondy. A few months later, on 12 August 1874, Charles obtained his baccalauréat with the distinction "mention bien" (equivalent to magna cum laude).

=== A dissipated youth ===
Charles was sent to the Sainte-Geneviève school (now located in Versailles), run by the Jesuits, at that time located in the Latin Quarter of Paris, in order to prepare the admission test for the Saint-Cyr Military Academy. Charles was opposed to the strictness of the boarding school and decided to abandon all religious practice. He obtained his second baccalauréat in August 1875. He led a dissipated lifestyle at that point in time and was expelled from the school for being "lazy and undisciplined" in March 1876.

He then returned to Nancy, where he studied tutoring whilst secretly perusing light readings. During his readings with Gabriel Tourdes, he wanted to "completely enjoy that which is pleasant to the mind and body". This reading introduced the two students to the works of Aristotle, Voltaire, Erasmus, Rabelais and Laurence Sterne.

In June 1876, he applied for entrance to the Saint-Cyr Military Academy, and was accepted eighty-second out of four hundred and twelve. He was one of the youngest in his class. His record at Saint-Cyr was a mixed one and he graduated 333rd out of a class of 386.

The death of de Foucauld's grandfather and the receipt of a substantial inheritance, was followed by his entry into the French cavalry school at Saumur. Continuing to lead an extravagant life style, de Foucauld was posted to the 4th Regiment of Chasseurs d'Afrique in Algeria. Bored with garrison service he travelled in Morocco (1883–84), the Sahara (1885), and Palestine (1888–89). While reverting to being a wealthy young socialite when in Paris, de Foucauld became an increasingly serious student of the geography and culture of Algeria and Morocco. In 1885, the Societe de Geographie de Paris awarded him its gold medal in recognition of his exploration and research.

=== Religious life ===
On 14 January 1890, de Foucauld entered the Trappist monastery of Notre-Dame des Neiges, where he received, as a novice, the religious name Marie-Albéric on the feast of St. Alberic, 26 January. According to a plea which he sent to the abbot prior to his entrance in Notre-Dame des Neiges, after some months of novitiate Br. Marie-Albéric was sent to the abbey of La Trappe at Akbès on the Syrian-Turkish border. But despite the strict life of the Trappists according to their vow of poverty, de Foucauld considered the life of the residents in the surrounding villages to be more miserable.

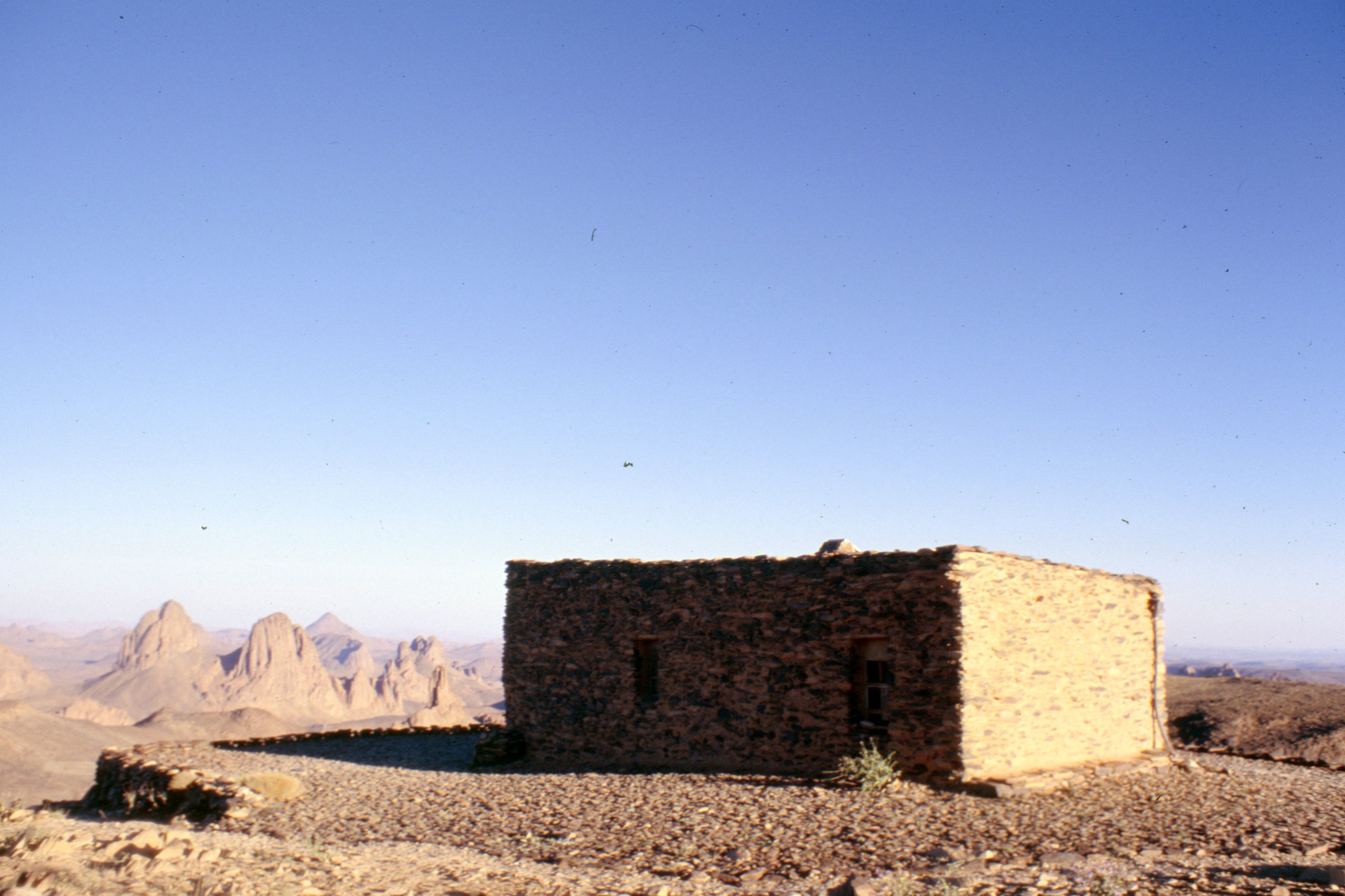
De Foucauld's hermitage, built in 1911 on the Assekrem (2780 m)

In 1897, after seven years, he therefore left the order and began to lead a life of prayer near a convent of Poor Clares in Nazareth where he worked as a porter and servant. There he created his own monastic rule that he followed the rest of his life. After some time, it was suggested to him that he be ordained, so he returned to Akbès for some time in order to prepare for the ordination to the priesthood. On 9 June 1901, at the age of 43, he received the ordination.

After that, he went to the Sahara in French Algeria and continued to live an eremitical lifestyle. At that time he adopted the religious name Charles of Jesus. He first settled in Béni Abbès, near the Moroccan border, building a small hermitage for "adoration and hospitality", which he soon referred to as the "fraternity" and both himself and the future members as "Little Brothers of Jesus".

De Foucauld moved to be with the Tuareg people, in Tamanghasset in southern Algeria. This region is the central part of the Sahara with the Ahaggar Mountains (the Hoggar) immediately to the west. De Foucauld used the highest point in the region, the Assekrem, as a place of retreat. Living close to the Tuareg and sharing their life and hardships, he made a ten-year study of their language and cultural traditions. He learned the Tuareg language and worked on a dictionary and grammar. His dictionary manuscript was published posthumously in four volumes.

=== Death ===
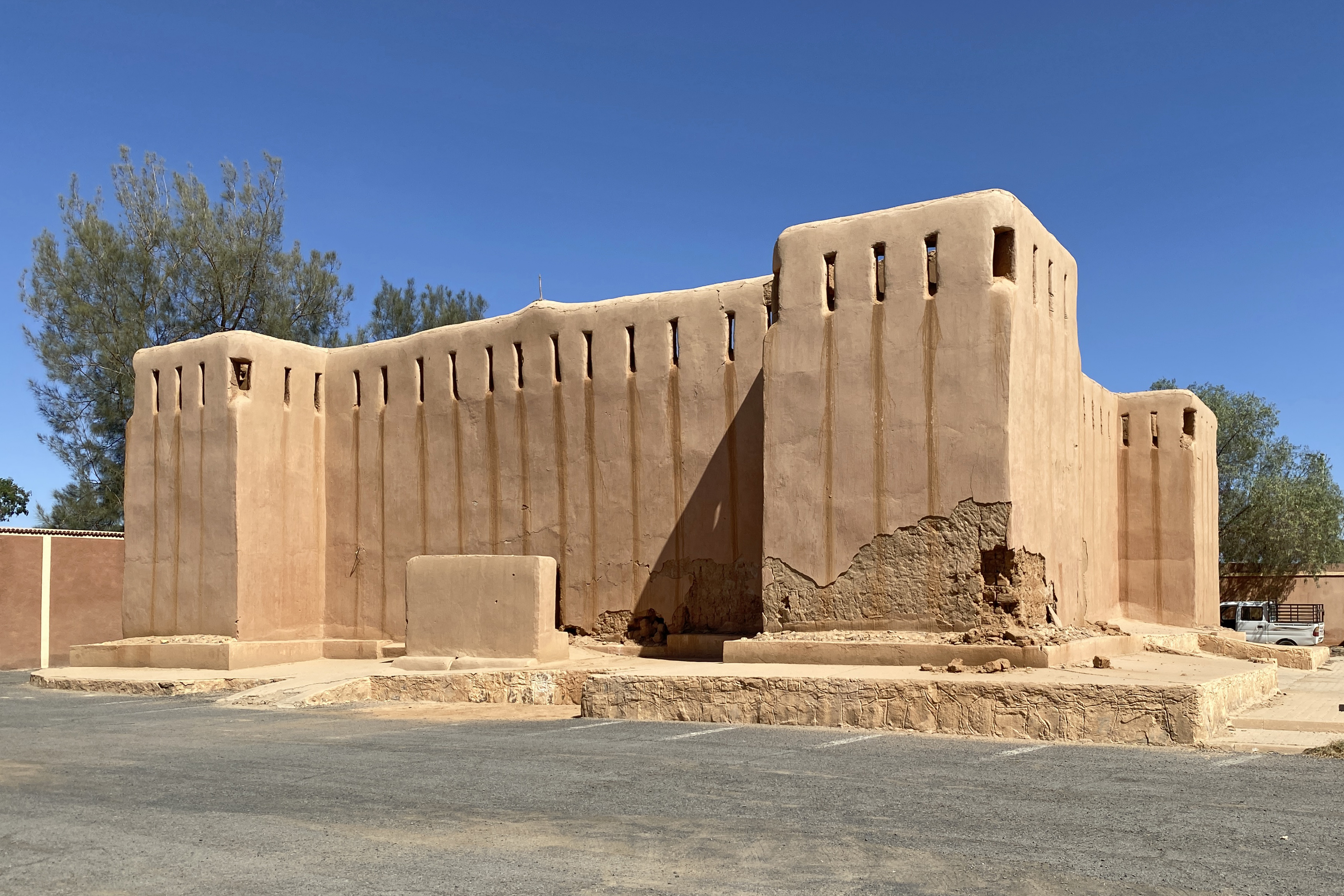
Bordj of Tamanrasset, Algeria

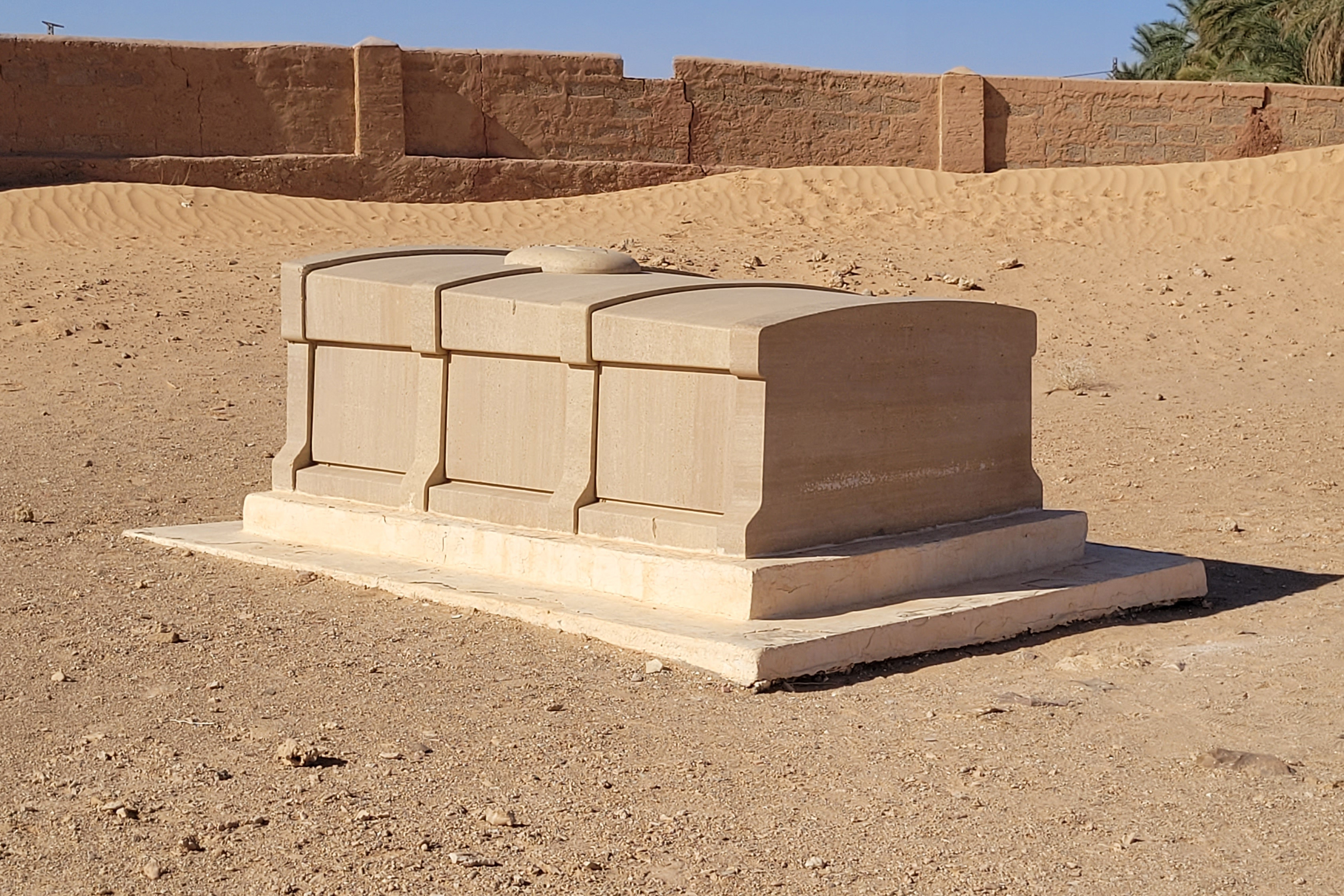
Tomb of Charles de Foucauld in El Ménia, Algeria

On 1 December 1916, de Foucauld was dragged from the bordj of Tamanrasset by a group of tribal bandits, led by El Madani ag Soba, who was connected with the Senussi Bedouin. They intended to kidnap de Foucauld. However, they were interrupted by two Méharistes of the French Camel Corps. One startled bandit (15-year-old Sermi ag Thora) shot de Foucauld through the head, killing him instantly. The Méharistes were also shot dead. The murder was witnessed by sacristan and servant Paul Embarek, an African Arab former slave liberated and instructed by de Foucauld. The Islamic Tuareg people buried him the morning after his death, which was evidence of de Foucauld's friendship with them.

The French authorities continued for years searching for the bandits involved. In 1943, El Madani fled French forces in Libya to the remote South Fezzan. Sermi ag Thora was apprehended and executed at Djanet in 1944.

After his assassination, de Foucauld's naked body was hastily buried at the scene of the event. Only in April 1929, the mortal remains of Charles de Foucauld were transferred to the oasis of El Meniaa to a dignified tomb in the cemetery near the local parish of St. Joseph.

== Veneration ==
Charles de Foucauld was beatified by Cardinal José Saraiva Martins on 13 November 2005, on behalf of Pope Benedict XVI. (Note: Pope Benedict XVI changed the procedure for beatification such that the pope no longer presides at beatification ceremonies, but instead the prefect of the Congregation for the Causes of Saints.)

On 27 May 2020, Pope Francis issued a decree which approved a second miracle, clearing the way for de Foucauld to be canonized. On 4 March 2022, a papal consistory opened the way for the canonization which took place on 15 May 2022, together with a number of others including Titus Brandsma.

Pope Leo XIV sees de Foucauld as one of several saints who, during their lives, "discovered that the poorest are not only objects of our compassion, but teachers of the Gospel. It is not a question of 'bringing' God to them, but of encountering [God] among them."

His feast is on 1 December.

== Religious communities inspired by de Foucauld ==
De Foucauld inspired and helped to organize a confraternity within France in support of his ideas. This organization, the Association of the Brothers and Sisters of the Sacred Heart of Jesus, consisted of 48 lay and ordained members at the time of his death. Members of this group, notably Louis Massignon, a scholar of Islam, and René Bazin, author of a biography, La Vie de Charles de Foucauld Explorateur en Maroc, Ermite du Sahara (1923), kept his memory alive and inspired the family of lay and religious fraternities. Though French in origin, these groups have expanded to include many cultures and their languages on every populated continent. The Charles de Foucauld Spiritual Family Association brings together the Little Brothers of Jesus, the Little Sisters of Jesus, founded by Madeline Hutin and 18 other religious congregations and associations for priests, religious and laypeople which were inspired by de Foucauld. De Foucauld also inspired individuals such as Albert Peyriguère and André Poissonnier (the founder of the monastery of Tazert) to live as hermits among the Berbers.

List of religious communities inspired by Charles de Foucauld
Type of community	Name of community (year of foundation)		
Type of community	Mixed	For men	For women
Associations of the faithful	Sodality Union (1909); Charles de Foucauld Group (1923); Lay Fraternity of Charles de Foucauld (1952 or 1955); Comunitat de Jesus (1968)	—	Charles de Foucauld Fraternity (1991 or 1992)
Religious institutes	—	Little Brothers of Jesus (1933); Little Brothers of the Gospel (1956); Little Brothers of Jesus Caritas (1969); Little Brothers of the Incarnation (1976); Little Brothers of the Cross (1980); Apostles of Hope Congregation (1997); Little Brothers of the Heart of Jesus (2000)	Little Sisters of the Sacred Heart (1933); Little Sisters of Jesus (1939); Little Sisters of the Gospel (1963); Little Sisters of Nazareth (1966); Little Sisters of the Heart of Jesus (1977); Little Sisters of the Incarnation (1985); Disciples of the Gospel (2000)
Societies of apostolic life	—	Jesus Caritas Priestly Fraternity (1951)	—
Secular institutes	Missionaries of Jesus the Servant (1979 or 1982)	—	Jesus Caritas Fraternity (1952)

== Legacy ==
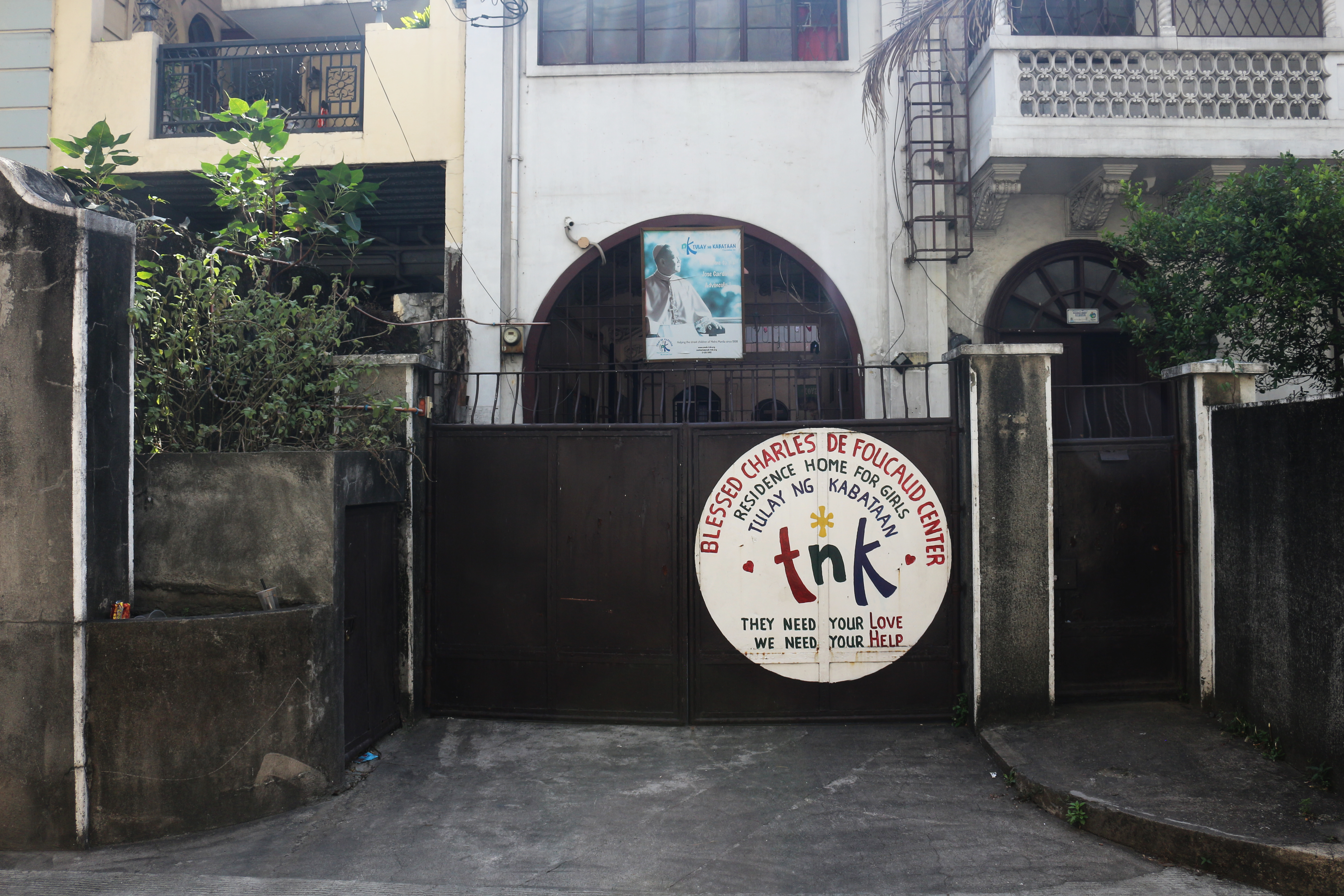
The Charles de Foucauld Center in Manila, Philippines, provides shelter to former street children, specifically serving as a residential home for girls and young women

The 1936 French film The Call of Silence depicted his life.

The 1941-42 class (128th) of the Saint-Cyr military academy in France was named after him.

In 1950, the colonial Algerian government issued a postage stamp with his image. The French government did the same in 1959. The Vatican also released a stamp in his honour in late 2025.

Antonello Padovano wrote and directed the film "The Four Doors of the Desert" based on Charles de Foucauld's life and his friendship with the Tuareg Amenokal Moussa Ag Amastan.

Charles de Foucauld is honored in the Church of England and in the Episcopal Church on 1 December.

== Works ==
- Reconnaissance au Maroc, 1883–1884. 4 vols. Paris: Challamel, 1888.
- Dictionnaire Touareg–Français, Dialecte de l'Ahaggar. 4 vols. Paris: Imprimerie nationale de France, 1951–1952.
- Poésies Touarègues. Dialecte de l'Ahaggar. 2 vols. Paris: Leroux, 1925–1930.
- Meditations of a Hermit
- Hope in the Gospels
- Écrits spirituels de Charles de Foucauld: ermite au Sahara, apôtre des Touregs
- Charles de Foucauld: Writings Selected with an Introduction
- The Spiritual Autobiography of Charles De Foucauld
- 15 Days of Prayer
- Hope in the Gospels
- Scriptural Meditations on Faith
- Letters from the desert
- L'esprit de Jésus
- Au fil des jours
- Adventurers of God's Love (80 letters from Charles de Foucauld to Louis Massignon)
