= Cistercian architecture =

Architectural style

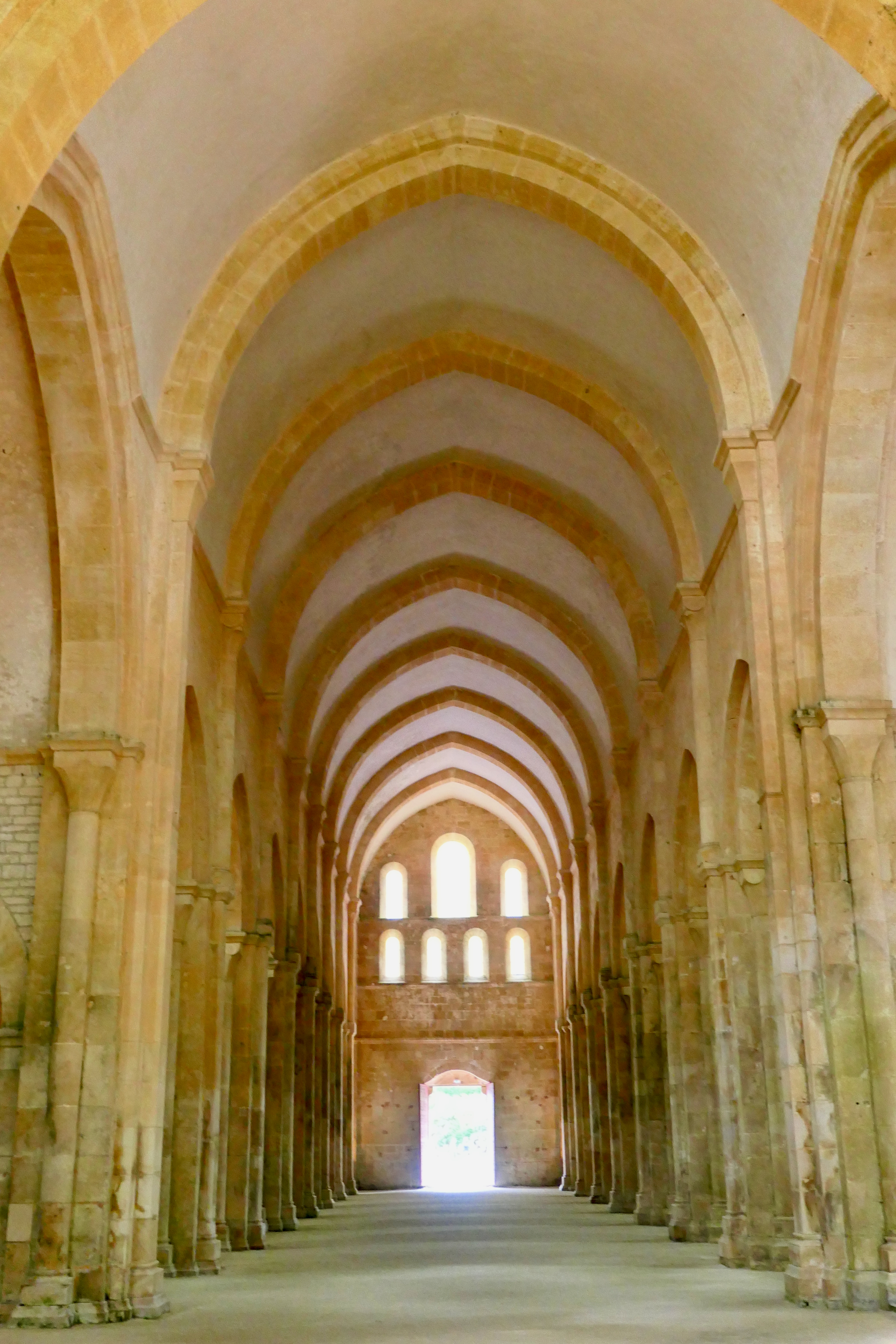
Fontenay Abbey, France

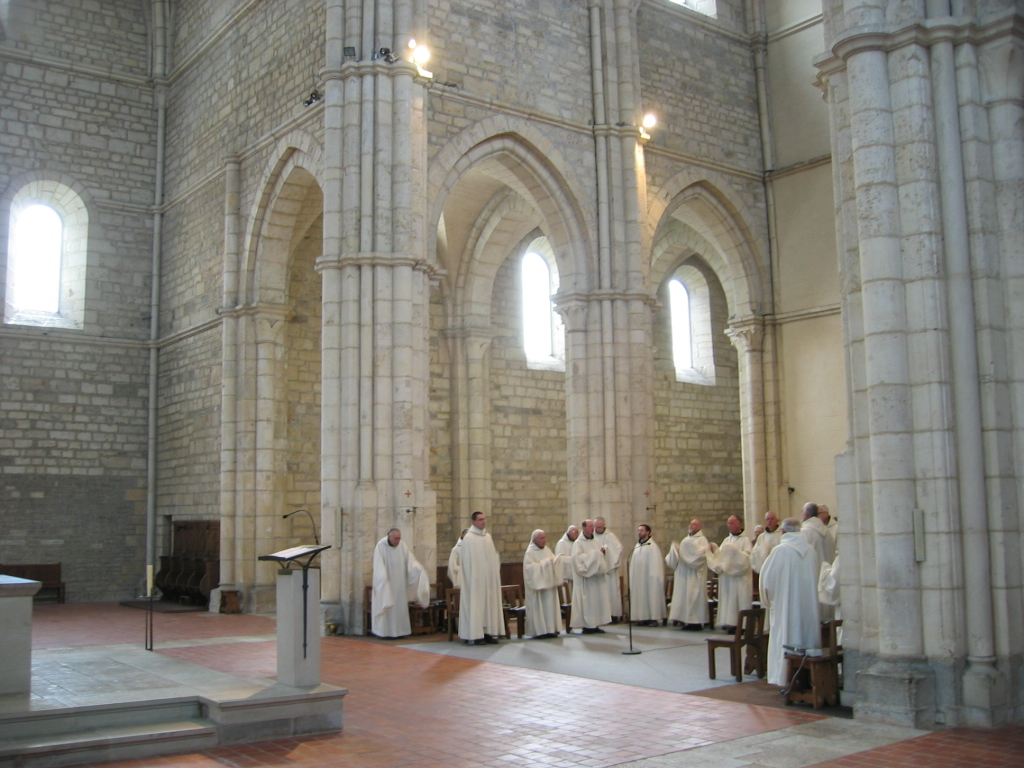
The "architecture of light" of Acey Abbey represents the pure style of Cistercian architecture, intended for the utilitarian purposes of liturgical celebration.

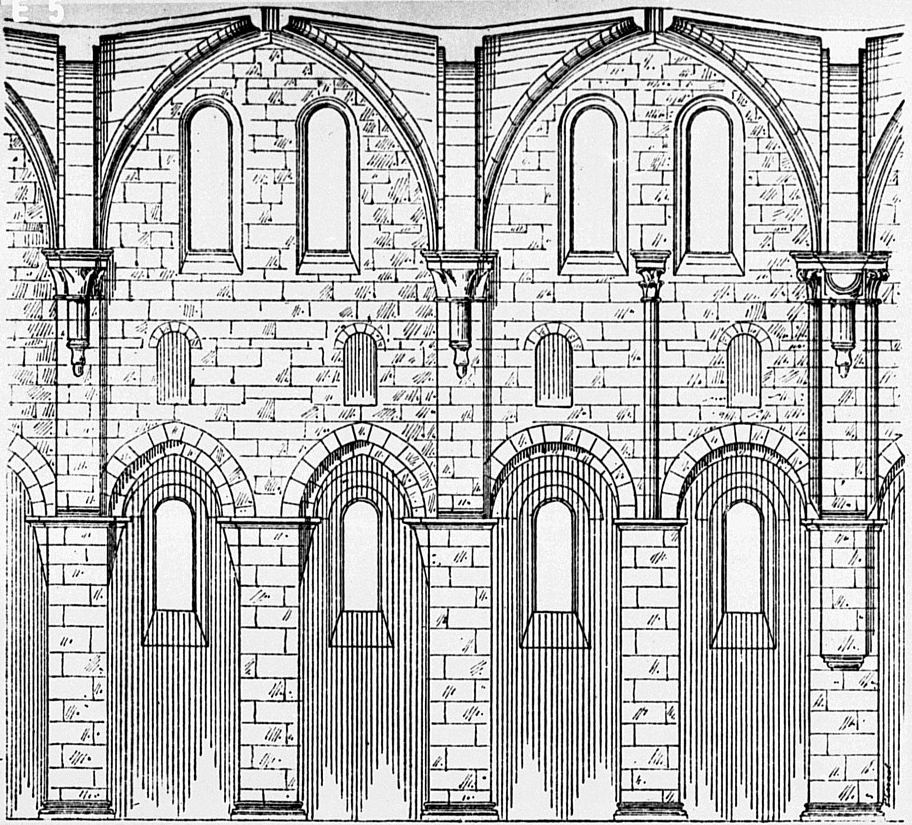
Cistercian architecture was applied based on rational principles.

Cistercian architecture is a style of architecture associated with the churches, monasteries and abbeys of the Roman Catholic Cistercian Order. It was heavily influenced by Bernard of Clairvaux (d. 1153), who believed that churches should avoid superfluous ornamentation so as not to distract from prayer. Although a few images of religious subjects were allowed, such as the crucifix, elaborate figures common in medieval churches were prohibited. Later abbeys were constructed in Renaissance and Baroque styles, which were more ornate by nature.

Most of the famous Cistercian abbeys were begun in the 12th and 13th centuries and were located in remote valleys. They begin at the end of the period when Romanesque architecture dominated, and continued into the period of Gothic architecture.

== Theological principles ==
In the mid-12th century, one of the leading churchmen of his day, the Benedictine Abbot Suger of Saint-Denis, united elements of Romanesque architecture with elements of Burgundian architecture (rib vaults and pointed arches respectively), leading to what was later termed Gothic architecture. This "architecture of light" was intended to raise the observer "from the material to the immaterial" – it was, according to the 20th-century historian Georges Duby, a "monument of applied theology." In order to achieve such moving effects, the interiors of many religious buildings were designed to be witnessed at specific times of the day such as sunrise and sunset. Bernard saw much of church decoration as a distraction from piety, and in one of his letters he condemned some forms of early 12th-century decoration such as "unsightly monkeys" and "a diversit of strange shapes everywhere."

Such sentiments were repeated frequently throughout the Middle Ages, and the builders of the Cistercian monasteries had to adopt a style that observed the numerous rules inspired by Bernard's austere aesthetics. However, the order itself was receptive to the technical improvements of Gothic principles of construction and played an important role in its spread across Europe.

This new Cistercian architecture embodied the ideals of the order, and was in theory at least utilitarian and without superfluous ornament. While the order followed certain regulations strictly, Matthias Untermann argues that there were no building regulations regarding architectural plans (in an art historical sense) but rather an emphasis on poverty and simplicity as described in Cistercian monastic literature. A certain homogeneity resulted: various buildings, including the chapter-house to the east and the dormitories above, were grouped around a cloister, and were sometimes linked to the transept of the church itself by a night stair. Usually Cistercian churches were cruciform, with a short presbytery to meet the liturgical needs of the brethren, small chapels in the transepts for private prayer, and an aisled nave that was divided roughly in the middle by a screen to separate the monks from the lay brothers.

The mother house of the order, Cîteaux Abbey, had in fact developed the most advanced style of painting, at least in illuminated manuscripts, during the first decades of the 12th century, playing an important part in the development of the image of the Tree of Jesse. However, Bernard of Clairvaux quickly gained influence in the order. Since he was averse to imagery, painting ceased and was finally banned altogether, probably from the revised rules approved in 1154. Crucifixes were allowed, and later some painting and decoration crept back in. Conrad Rudolph argues that Cistercian architecture after Clairvaux I represents a compromise between Bernardine ideals and "architectural monumentality."

== Construction ==
The building projects of the Church in the High Middle Ages showed an ambition for the colossal, with vast amounts of stone being quarried, and the same was true of the Cistercian projects. Foigny Abbey was 98 metres (322 ft) long, and Vaucelles Abbey was 132 metres (433 ft) long. Monastic buildings came to be constructed entirely of stone, right down to the most humble of buildings. In the 12th and 13th centuries, Cistercian barns consisted of a stone exterior, divided into nave and aisles either by wooden posts or by stone piers.

The Cistercians acquired a reputation in the difficult task of administering the building sites for abbeys and cathedrals. St Bernard's own brother, Achard, is known to have supervised the construction of many abbeys, such as Himmerod Abbey in the Rhineland. Others were Raoul at Saint-Jouin-de-Marnes, who later became abbot there; Geoffrey d'Aignay, sent to Fountains Abbey in 1133; and Robert, sent to Mellifont Abbey in 1142. On one occasion the Abbot of La Trinité at Vendôme loaned a monk named John to the Bishop of Le Mans, Hildebert de Lavardin, for the building of a cathedral; after the project was completed, John refused to return to his monastery.

The Cistercians "made it a point of honour to recruit the best stonecutters", and as early as 1133, St Bernard was hiring workers to help the monks erect new buildings at Clairvaux. It is from the 12th-century Byland Abbey in Yorkshire that the oldest recorded example of architectural tracing is found. Tracings were architectural drawings incised and painted in stone, to a depth of 2–3 mm (0.079–0.118 in), showing architectural detail to scale. The first tracing in Byland illustrates a west rose window, while the second depicts the central part of that same window. Later, an (idealized) illustration from the latter half of the 16th century showed monks working alongside other craftsmen in the construction of Schönau Abbey.

Because of the variety found in Cistercian communities, historian Marcel Aubert concluded that, while there was a Cistercian spirit in architecture, there was never a Cistercian architectural style.

=== Engineering ===
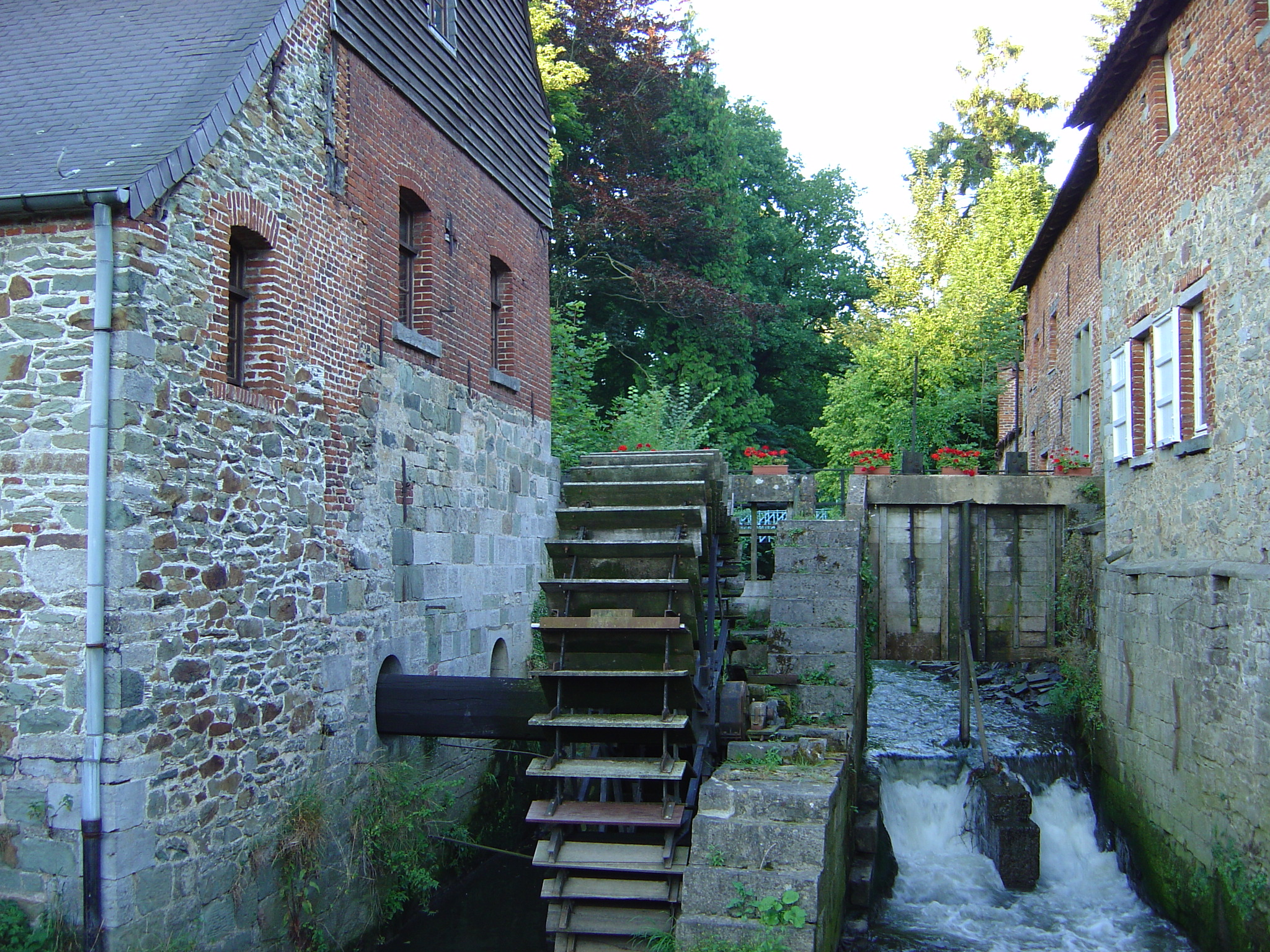
The Cistercians made extensive use of waterwheel technology.

The Cistercian order was quite innovative in developing techniques of hydraulic engineering for monasteries established in remote valleys. In Spain, one of the earliest surviving Cistercian houses, the Real Monasterio de Nuestra Senora de Rueda in Aragon, is a good example of such early hydraulic engineering, using a large waterwheel for power and an elaborate water circulation system for central heating. Much of this practicality in Cistercian architecture, and indeed in the construction itself, was made possible by the order's own technological inventiveness. The Cistercians are known to have been skilled metallurgists.

Much of the progress of architecture depended on the mastery of metal, from its extraction to the cutting of the stone, especially in relation to the quality of the metal tools used in construction. Metal was also used extensively by Gothic architects from the 12th century on, in tie rods across arches and later in the reinforced stone of the Rayonnant style.

== Legacy ==
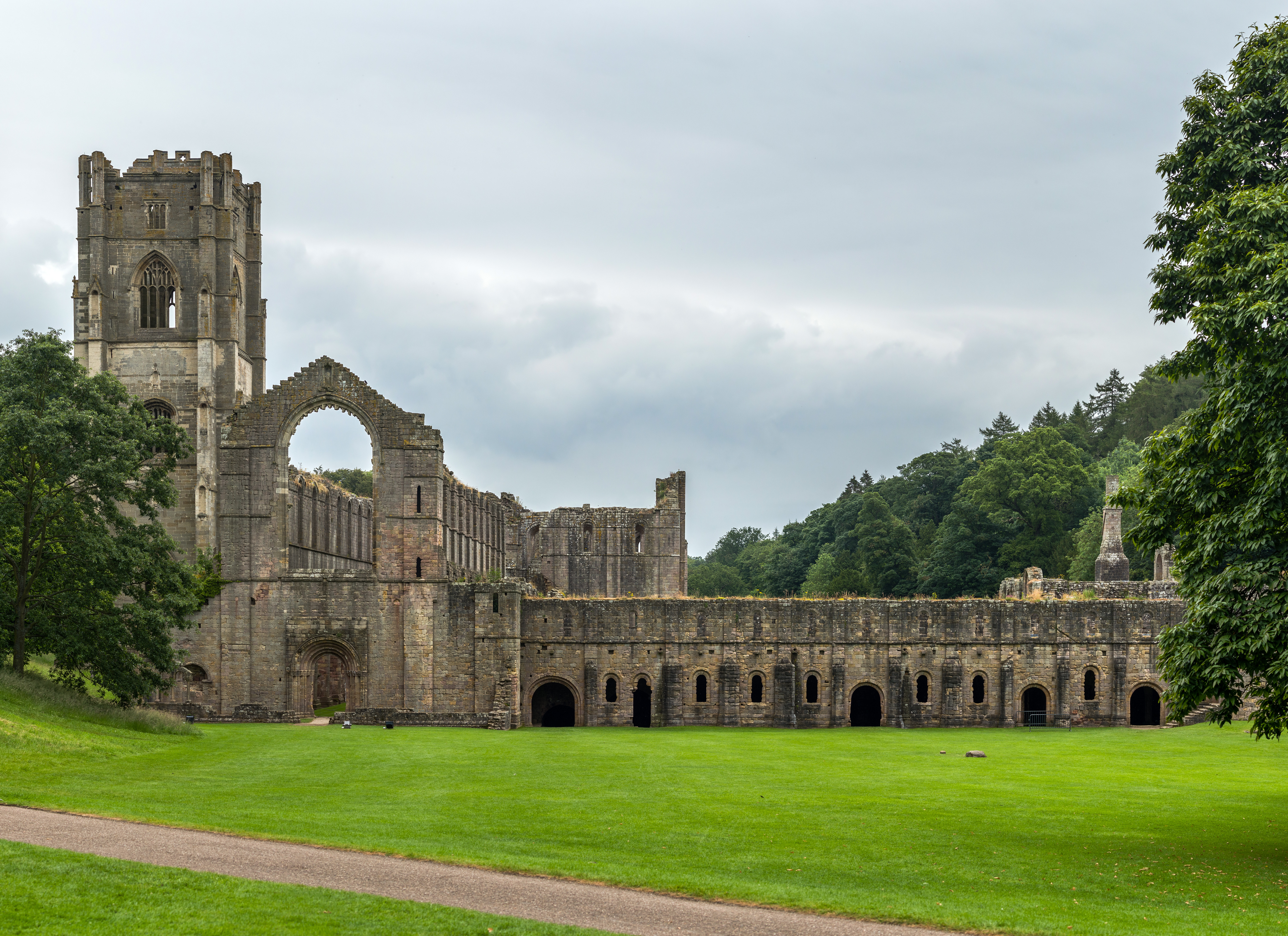
Fountains Abbey - a UNESCO World Heritage Site

The Cistercian abbeys of Fontenay in France, Fountains in England, Alcobaça in Portugal, Poblet in Spain and Maulbronn in Germany are today recognised as UNESCO World Heritage Sites.

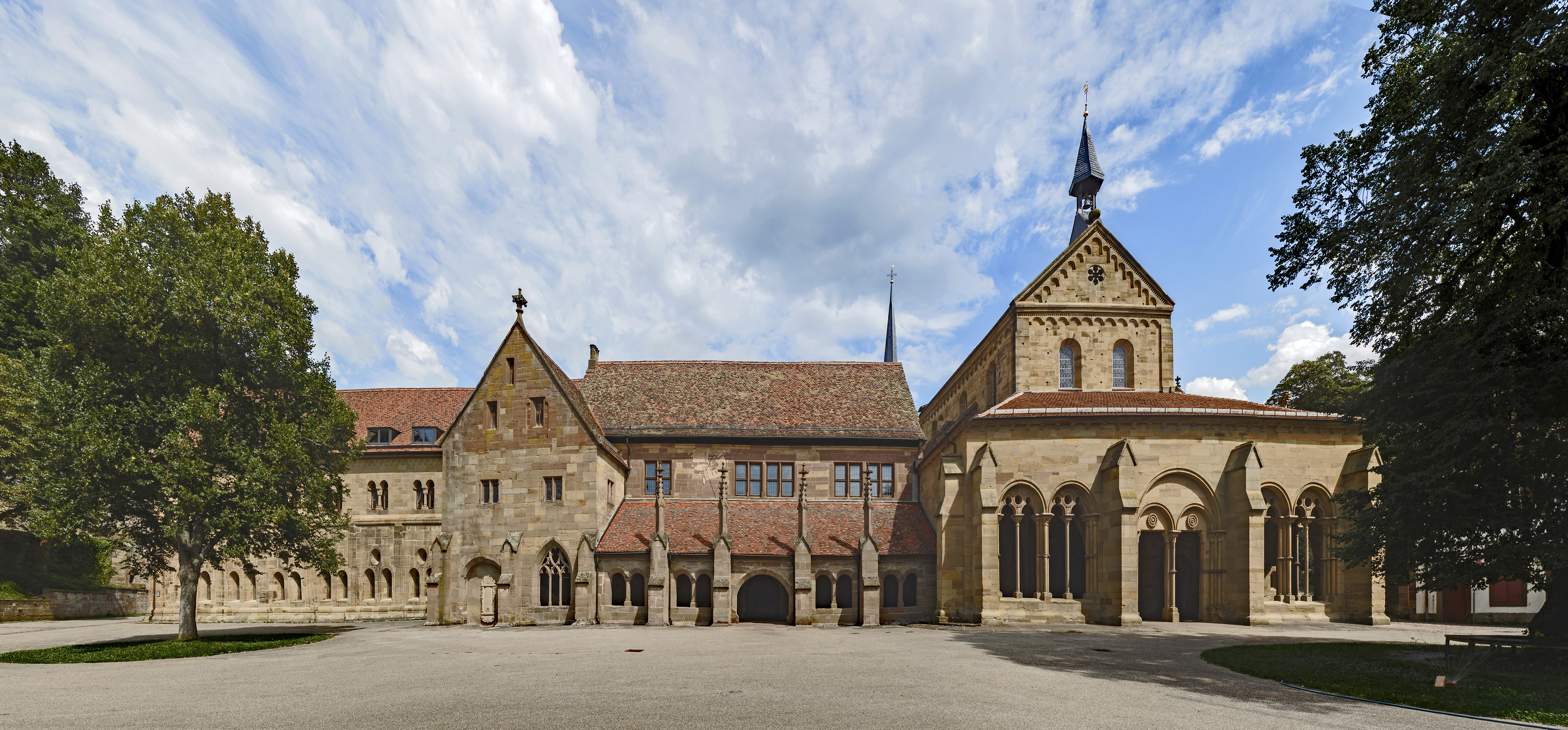
Maulbronn Abbey - a UNESCO World Heritage Site

The abbeys of France, England and Spain are fine examples of Romanesque and Gothic architecture. The architecture of Fontenay has been described as "an excellent illustration of the ideal of self-sufficiency" practised by the earliest Cistercian communities.

The abbeys of 12th-century England were stark and undecorated – a dramatic contrast with the elaborate churches of the wealthier Benedictine houses – yet to quote Warren Hollister, "even now the simple beauty of Cistercian ruins such as Fountains and Rievaulx, set in the wilderness of Yorkshire, is deeply moving".

In the architectural style and the materials with which the Alcobaça Monastery was built, Portugal possesses one of the best preserved examples of Early Gothic. In Spain, Valbuena Abbey, Monastery of Iranzu, Santes Creus or Poblet Abbey are also among the best preserved cistercian monasteries, especially impressive for their, in the case of Poblet, for the fortified royal residence within.

The fortified Maulbronn Abbey in Germany is considered "the most complete and best-preserved medieval monastic complex north of the Alps". The Transitional Gothic style of its church had a major influence in the spread of Gothic architecture over much of northern and central Europe, and the abbey's elaborate network of drains, irrigation canals and reservoirs has since been recognised as having "exceptional" cultural interest.

== Examples of Cistercian architecture ==
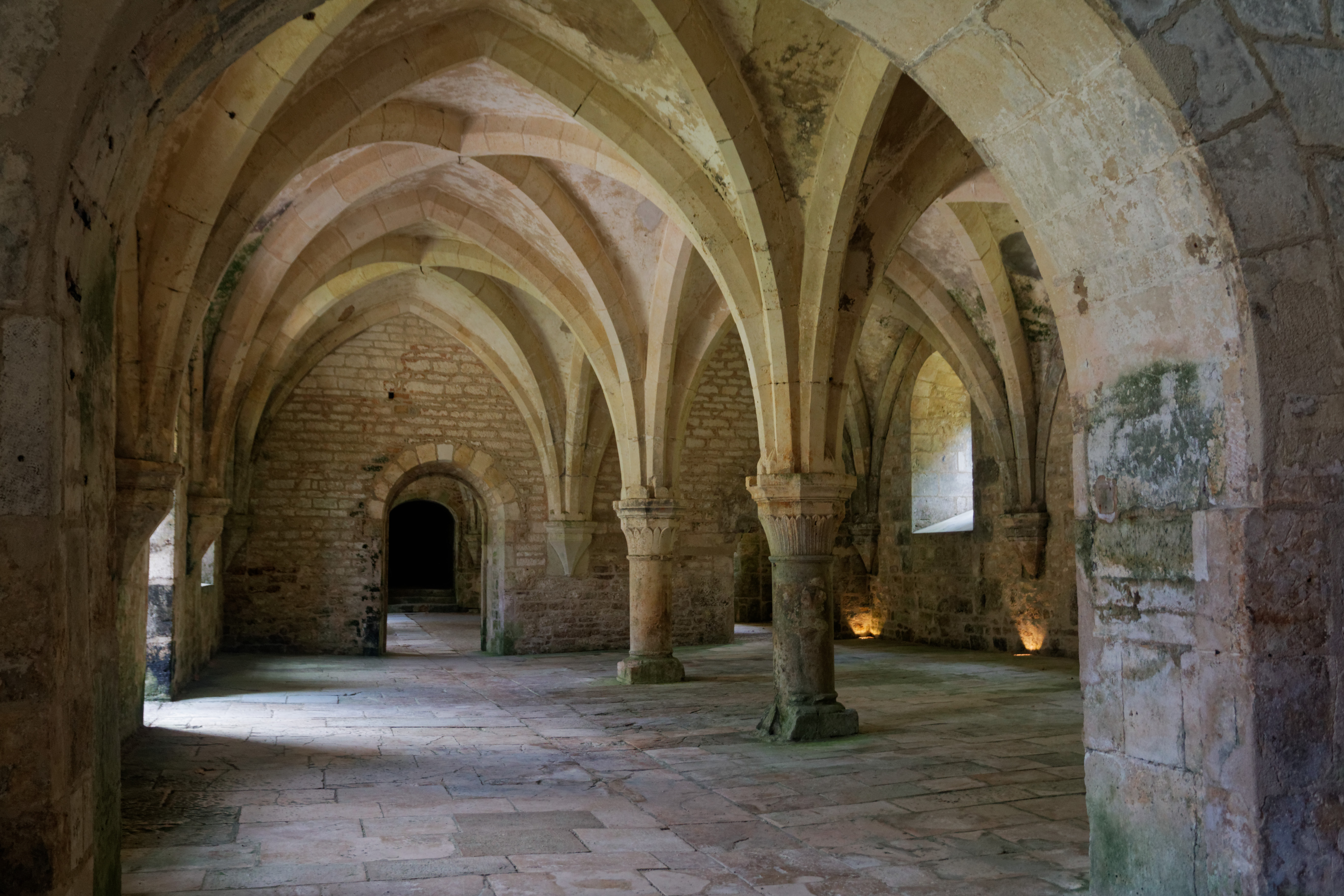
Fontenay Abbey, Chapter house, France

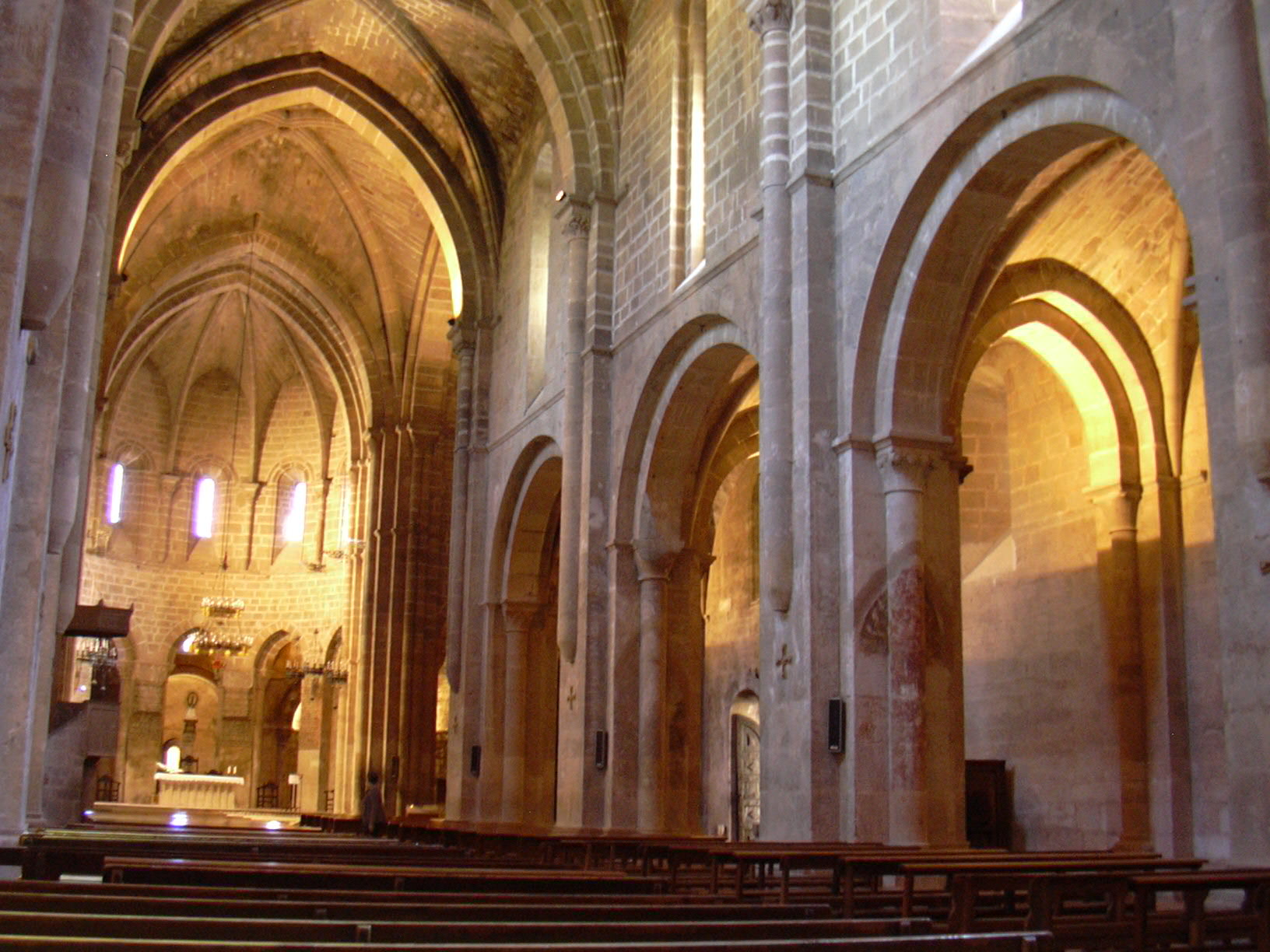
The "pure", unadorned style of Cistercian architecture at the 12th century Royal Monastery of Santa María de Veruela

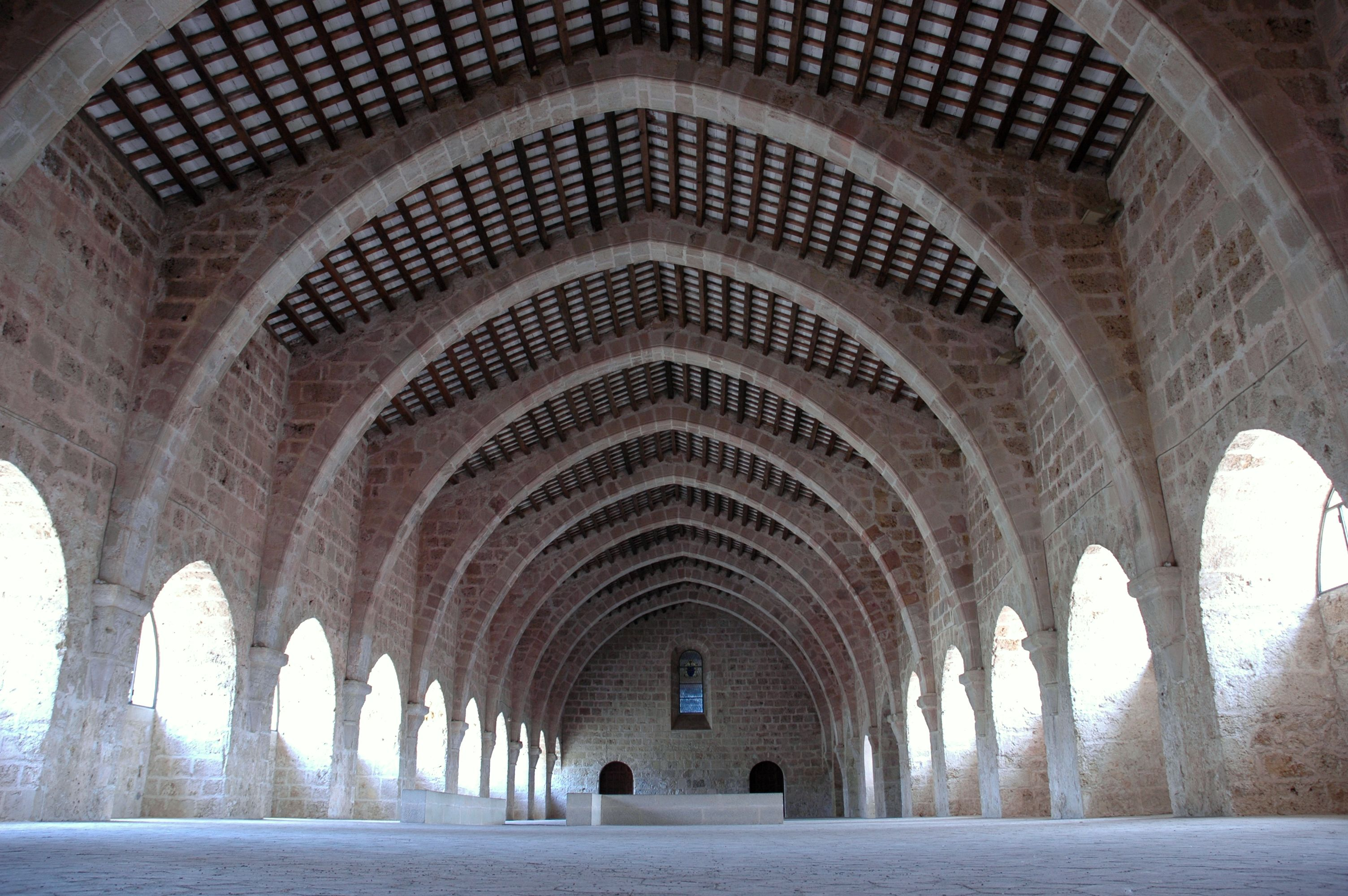
Santes Creus, Dormitory, Spain

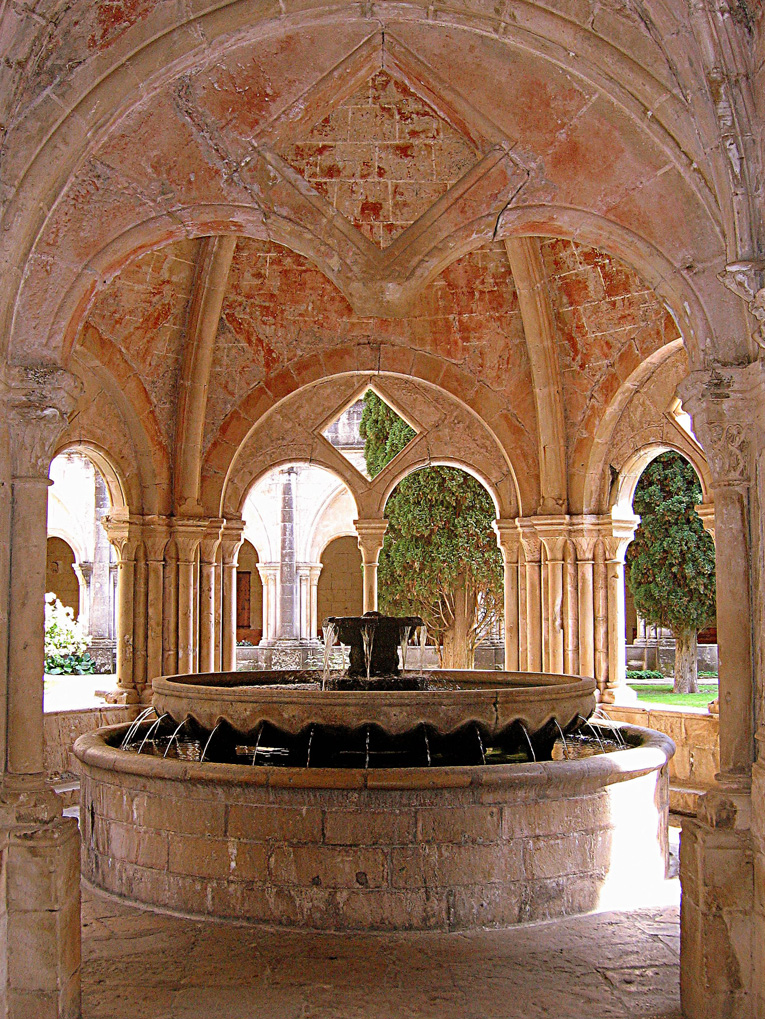
Poblet Abbey, Fountain, Spain

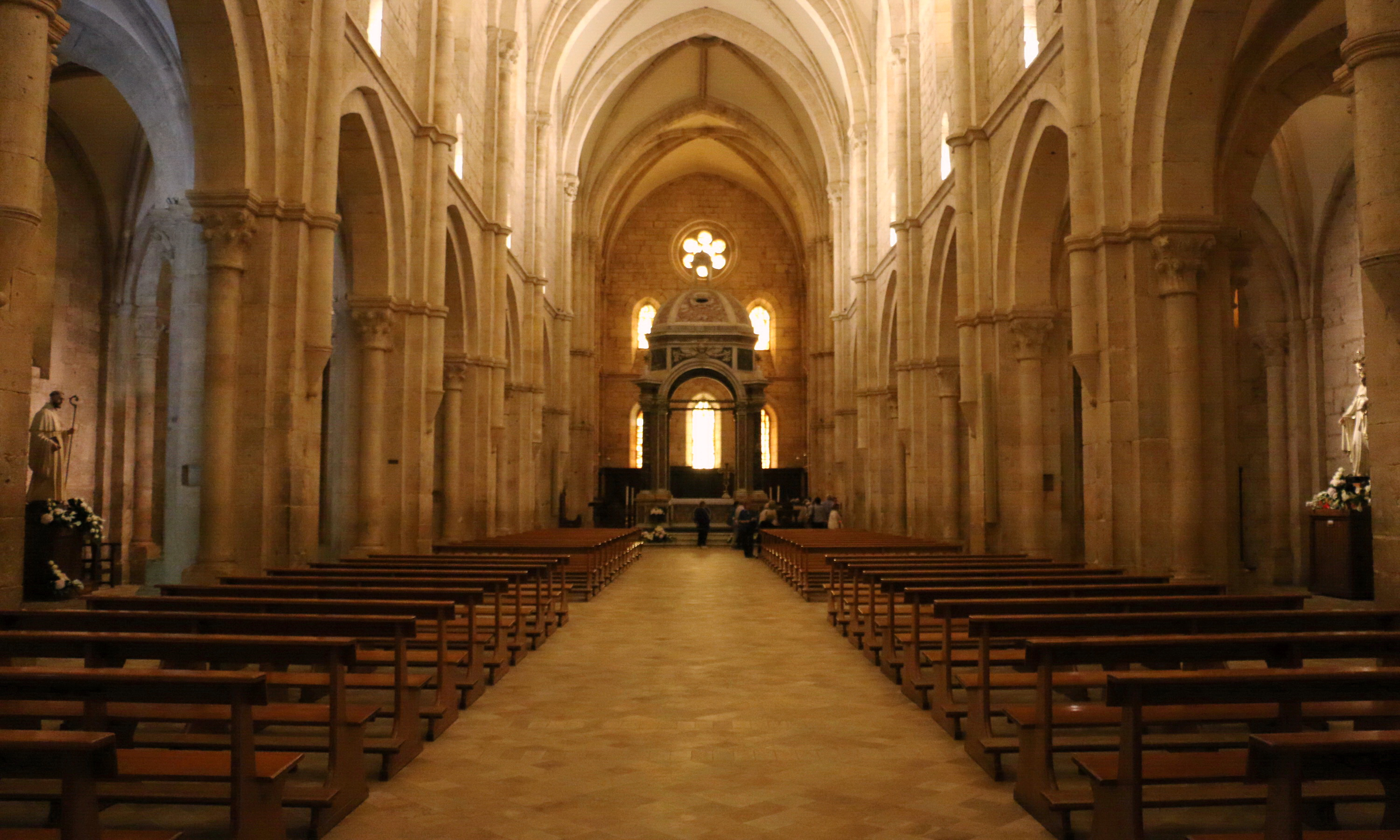
Casamari Abbey, Italy

France :

- Cîteaux Abbey (1098-1124, destroyed)
- Pontigny Abbey (1114)
- Clairvaux Abbey (1115-1151, destroyed)
- Abbey of Fontenay (1118)
- Hautecombe Abbey (1125)
- Noirlac Abbey (1136)
- Aiguebelle Abbey (1137)
- Fontfroide Abbey (1144)
- Grandselve Abbey (1144)
- Abbaye de l'Étoile (1145)
- Silvacane Abbey (1144)
- Le Thoronet Abbey (1146)
- Sénanque Abbey (1148-1150)
- Savigny Abbey (1147)
- Vaux-de-Cernay Abbey (1147)
- Abbaye Notre-Dame de Bonport (1189-1191)
- Abbaye Notre-Dame de Fontaine-Guérard (1207)
- Royaumont Abbey (1228)
- Maubuisson Abbey (1234)

Spain :

- Moreruela Abbey (1132)
- Valbuena Abbey (1143)
- Monastery of Santa María de Huerta (1144)
- Veruela Abbey (1146)
- Santa María de la Oliva (1150)
- Santes Creus (1150-1158)
- Poblet Abbey (1151)
- Vallbona Abbey (1176)
- Monastery of Iranzu (1176 ou 1178)
- Monasterio de Piedra (1194)

Italy :

- Morimondo Abbey (1134)
- Fossanova Abbey (1134-1187)
- Chiaravalle Abbey (1135)
- Abbey of Chiaravalle della Colomba (1136)
- Casamari Abbey (1140)
- Staffarda Abbey (1140)
- Tre Fontane Abbey (1140)
- Chiaravalle Abbey, Fiastra (1142)
- Abbey of San Galgano (1181)
- Santa Maria Arabona (1197)

England:

- Waverley Abbey (1128)
- Furness Abbey (1123/7, Savignac)
- Rievaulx Abbey (1132)
- Fountains Abbey (1132-1135)
- Byland Abbey (1135, Savignac)
- Buildwas Abbey (1135, Savignac)
- Roche Abbey (1147)
- Kirkstall Abbey (c.1152)
- Cleeve Abbey (1198)
- Beaulieu Abbey (1203-04)
- Netley Abbey (1239)

Wales:

- Neath Abbey (1129, Savignac)
- Tintern Abbey (1131)
- Margam Abbey (1147)
- Valle Crucis Abbey (1201)

Scotland:

- Melrose Abbey (1136)
- Dundrennan Abbey (1142)
- Sweetheart Abbey (1273)

Other European countries :

- Heiligenkreuz Abbey (Austria) (1133)
- Eberbach Abbey (Germany) (1135)
- Hauterive Abbey (Switzerland) (1138)
- Zwettl Abbey (Austria) (1138)
- Villers Abbey (Belgium) (1146-1197)
- Maulbronn Monastery (Germany) (1147)
- Alcobaça Monastery (Portugal) (1148)
- Varnhem Abbey (Sweden) (1148)
- Mellifont Abbey (Ireland) (1152)
- Bebenhausen Abbey (Germany) (1189)

== See also ==
- Gothic cathedrals and churches
- List of Cistercian monasteries
