= Aiguebelle Abbey =

Abbey in Drôme, France

Coordinates: 44°27′45″N 4°50′32″E

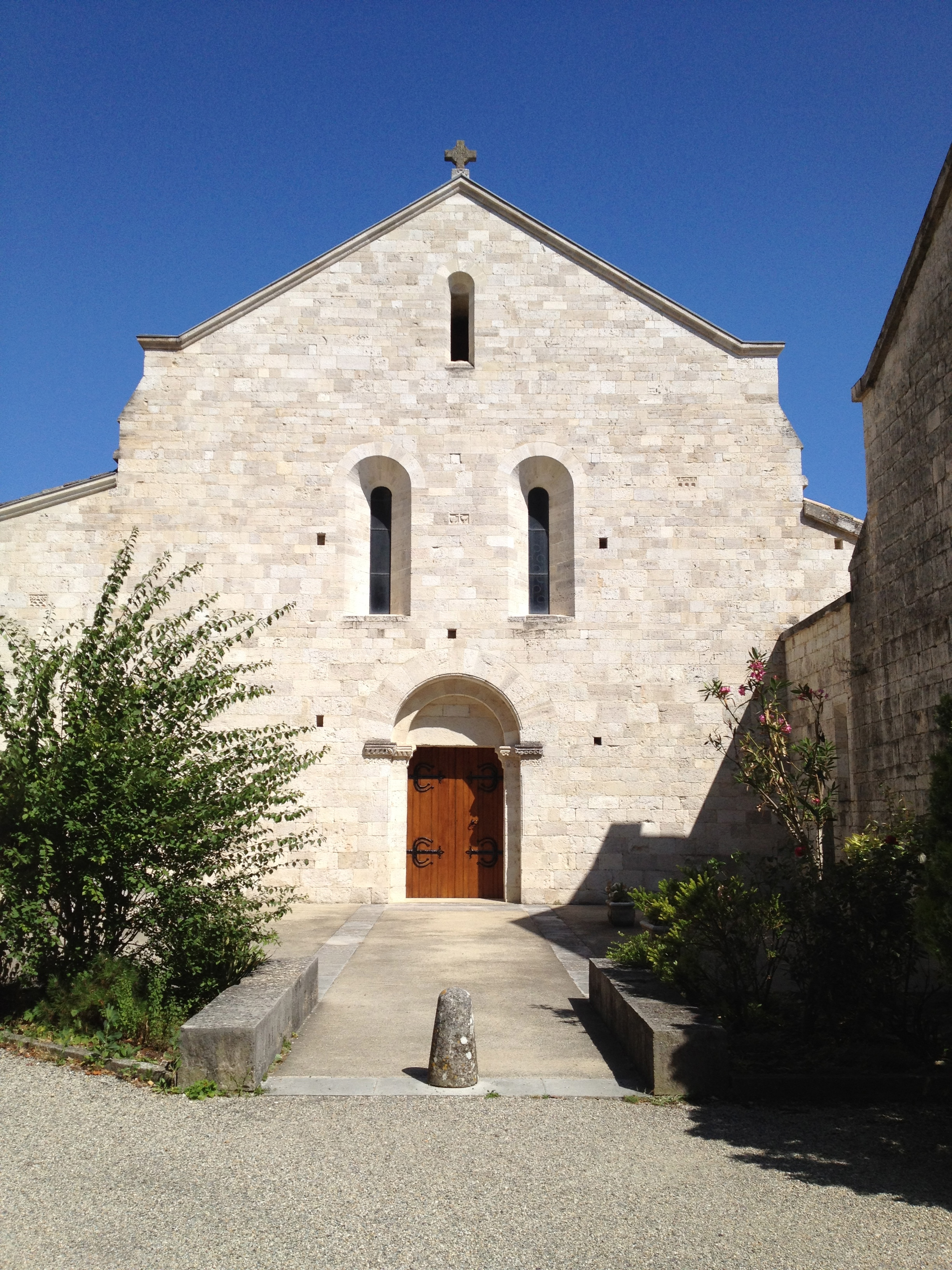
Aiguebelle Abbey

Aiguebelle Abbey (French: Abbaye Notre-Dame d'Aiguebelle) is a Trappist monastery situated in the communes of Montjoyer and Réauville in the département of Drôme, on the borders of the Dauphiné and of Provence, France.

== History ==
=== Benedictines ===
The first monastery here was Benedictine, founded in 1045 by Hugues Adhemar, baron of Grignan, and visited by Pope Paschal II in 1107, but shortly afterwards it fell into disuse.

=== Cistercians ===
The abbey was re-founded as a Cistercian monastery by Gontard Loup, lord of Rochefort-en-Valdaine, in 1137, and settled from Morimond Abbey, of which it was a daughter house. The founder endowed it with land nearby, and through the 12th and 13th centuries other benefactors added to its lands, thus ensuring its prosperity.

Already by 1167 it was sufficiently established to found a daughter house of its own, Fénier Abbey, closely followed by Le Bouchet Abbey in 1169.

By the end of the 13th century the abbey was extremely well established and influential, but gradually lost its position through the 14th century. In common with many other monasteries it suffered from the effects of the Black Death and the Hundred Years' War, and also from changing views of spirituality which led to a fall in the number of vocations, especially among the lay brothers who worked the estates, which in turn led to the estates being leased out. In 1515 its governance passed into the hands of commendatory abbots, which produced still more decline. By the time of the French Revolution, in 1791, when the abbey was dissolved, the dispersed community consisted of only three monks. The abbey's goods were sold off, but the buildings were too far from transport connections to be worth the effort of demolishing for the materials, and therefore were left standing.

=== Trappists ===
In 1815 the monastery was refounded by Trappists led by Pierre-François de Paul Malmy (Père Étienne) coming from La Valsainte, an abbey in Switzerland under the leadership of Augustin de Lestrange and under pursuit by revolutionary forces at the time. The new foundation flourished, and by 1850 had 233 monks.

The thriving Trappist community was able to found several other monasteries. In 1843 a Trappist community was established at Staoueli in Algeria, later Abbey of Our Lady of Atlas, which in turn gave rise to two communities, Notre-Dame de Tibhirine, at Tibhirine in Algeria, and Notre-Dame de l'Atlas au Maroc, at Midelt in Morocco. Aiguebelle also founded a community at Koutaba in Cameroon.

In France Aiguebelle undertook the foundation of Notre-Dame-des-Neiges, in Ardèche, in 1850, followed by the Abbey of Sainte-Marie-du-Désert at Bellegarde-Sainte-Marie (Haute-Garonne); Acey Abbey at Vitreux (Jura); the Abbey of Notre-Dame des Dombes at Le Plantay (Ain); and Bonnecombe Abbey at Comps-la-Grand-Ville (Aveyron).

Aiguebelle also oversees the nuns of Notre-Dame de Bon-Secours at Blauvac in the Vaucluse.

== Buildings ==
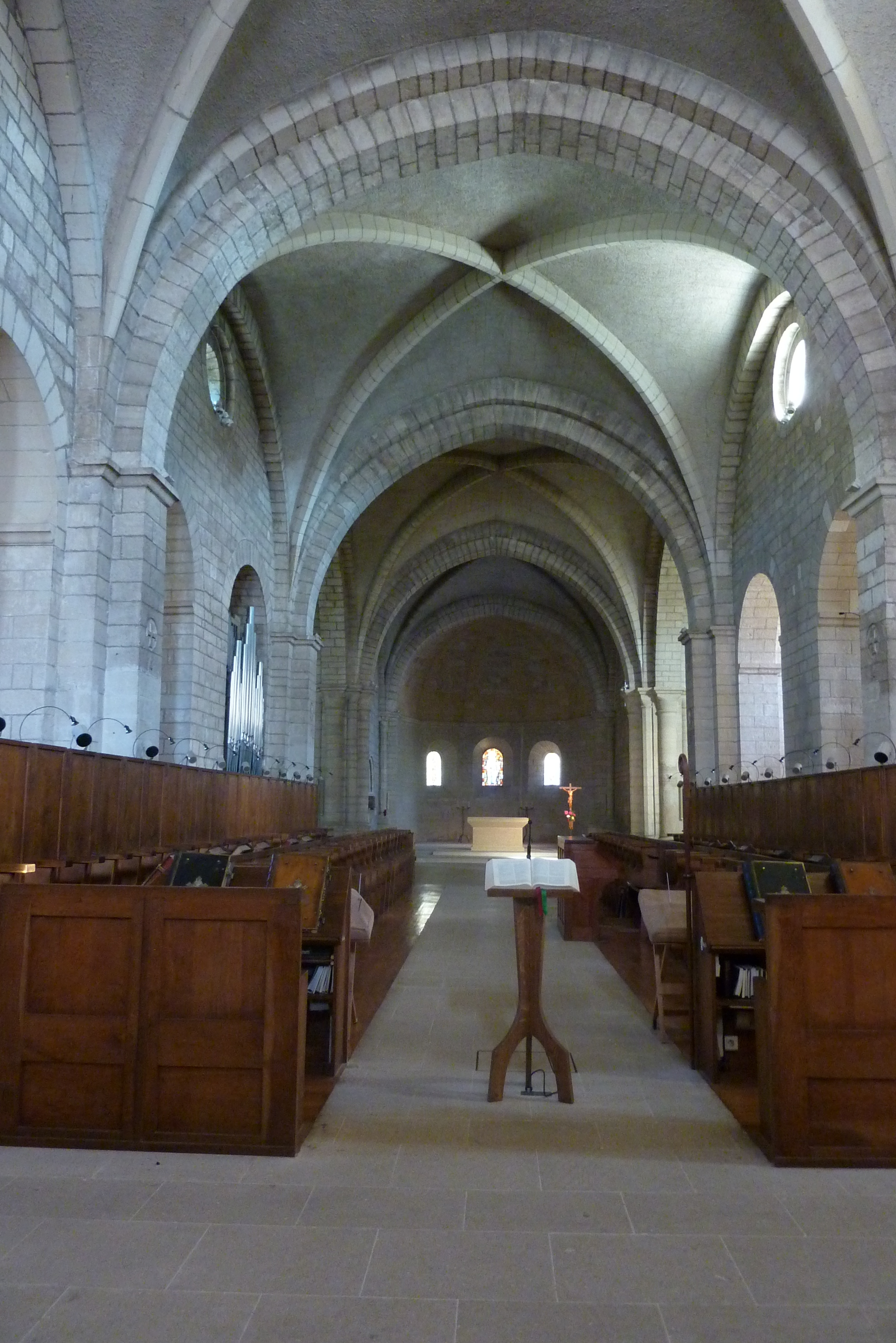
View of the basilica

Despite some demolitions and a great deal of restoration work, the abbey has kept the majority of its medieval buildings: the church, cloisters, sacristy, chapter house, refectory, kitchen and the lay-brothers' quarters. It is one of the only two Cistercian monastery premises in France - the other is the former Fontfroide Abbey - still to have the original passage of the lay-brothers, by which they were enabled to move round the abbey between their quarters, their places of work and their part of the church without disturbing the monks.

The abbey church was created a minor basilica in 1937.

== 1891 Murder ==
In 1891 a notorious crime occurred at the abbey. On 28 October Father Ildefonse, the procurator, was found murdered and valuables in his care stolen. The perpetrator proved to be a novice, Brother Eugène, whose secular name was Matthias Hadelt. A native of Saarlouis, Hadelt murdered Father Ildefonse upon being discovered in the act of stealing. Hadelt had committed many similar thefts from monasteries. He was sentenced to death on 4 May 1892, and died by guillotine at Valence on 5 July.

== See also ==
- Louis Évely

== Sources and external links ==
- Website of the present abbey (in French)
- Catholic Encyclopedia (Valence)
- Romanes.net: photos of Aiguebelle Abbey
