= Pedro de Artajona =

Bishop of Pamplona

Pedro de Artajona or Pedro de París (died 13 June 1193 in Pamplona) was a Spanish noble of the House of Artajona in the service of the Kingdom of Navarre. He was known as de París for having lived and studied in the French capital, not for being from there.

== Biography ==
Pedro was the Navarrese Bishop of Pamplona from 1167 until his death in 1193. During his time as Bishop, it is likely that he tutored Rodrigo Jiménez de Rada, the Navarese Bishop and Historian.

He further served the Kingdom of Navarre as an advisor and ambassador to Sancho IV of Navarre and is listed in the chronicles of Alonso VIII.

== Death and Burial ==
Pedro de Artajona died on 13 June 1193 and was buried at the Monastery of Iranzu that he himself founded.

Preceded by Viviano	Bishop of Pamplona; 1167–1193	Succeeded by Martín de Tafalla
