= Louis Évely =

Belgian Roman Catholic priest and writer

Louis Évely (1910–1985) was a writer and former Catholic priest from Belgium who published several books about the spiritual life. Despite leaving the priesthood in 1967, and his subsequent marriage, he remained active as a spiritual leader.

Évely was a pedagogue of the spiritual life and at the same time a publishing success. Several of his works sold in the hundreds of thousands and were translated into 25 languages. In the 1960s one of his sermons was reproduced in its entirety in a film directed by Éric Rohmer. One of his conferences on prayer held in Spain started a riot, as some conservative Catholics were shocked by his outspokenness.

Most of Évely's work, rather than the fruit of academic research, stems from preaching at conferences and retreats. Many of his listeners transcribed the text of talks to disseminate among their churches, often in carbon typescript or photocopies, long before the texts reached editors and printers.

== Life ==
Louis Évely was born in Brussels on 5 November 1910. Deemed a bright student, he was also a mystical teenager who discovered, thanks to Scouting, a sense of solidarity toward others and of the practical. Having completed his university education and obtaining two doctorates, one in law and the other in philosophy, he entered the Major Seminary, Mechelen, at the age of 23.

Ordained at 27, he was assigned to assist at a very poor rural school rather than, as he envisaged, as a professor at the University of Louvain. The school was at the edge of the battlefield of Waterloo. Through his experience catechizing children, Evely learned how to present the message of the gospel with simplicity.

A similar experience occurred to him as a chaplain of the World War II anti-Nazi resistance in the Ardennes. He was suddenly confronted with the task of addressing agnostics or anticlerical Maquis.

After the war he became the director of his school while also working as a teacher and chaplain for various nearby Christian groups.

Drawn by the spirituality of Charles de Foucauld, he started in Belgium some non-ordained fraternities inspired by de Foucauld's ideas. At that time, the reputation of Évely as a preacher led him to become a popular spiritual retreat director, speaker at religious conferences and to preach publicly to the fraternities, a movement of assistance to the Third World known as Ad Lucem (Latin, "to the light") and eventually a series of Lenten radio addresses. It was from these speeches that his first books developed.

Évely began to acquire a reputation for speaking with humor and a certain audacity, which irritated his superiors. In 1957 his archbishop, Cardinal Leo Jozef Suenens, who had been a classmate, asked him not to publish any more books. Shortly afterward, he resigned as school director.

Between the professional affronts and his active life, Évely's health seriously deteriorated and he was directed to take a rest cure in the mountains in France, lasting several months. Upon completing his rest, instead of returning to Belgium, he became an oblate at the Cistercian Aiguebelle Abbey in Provence, France. Without taking monastic vows, he took on the life of a monk: from chanting and praying, taking part in the manual work of the abbey as well as times of study and prayer. This contemplative life fully satisfied his mystical aspirations but, with the assistance of the abbot, he became aware that his true vocation was that of an evangelist. Thus he became an itinerant preacher in southwest France, helping the spiritual revival of parishes and directing retreats. However, his bishop refused him the imprimatur, a then-essential declaration for the publication of a book written by a priest. Translations of his works obtained the approval of bishops worldwide.

After inner struggles he applied to be laicized (dismissed from the clerical state), which church authorities granted in the summer of 1967. This began a period in which he produced and refined some his most highly regarded works, particularly those touching on the prayer of modern men and women.

Three years later, at the age of 60, Évely married a longtime friend, Mary, with whom he set up a home in Piégros-la-Clastre, a small village in Provence. There, he regained his preaching public, often including Protestants, in Alsace and Switzerland. In response to repeated requests, the Évely couple started a house of prayer, known as "L'Aube" (The Dawn) where a community runs spiritual exercises and training courses.

In the 1980s Evely felt his strength declining as his health waned, probably affected by a tropical disease contracted during a lecture tour in Africa. He died on 30 August 1985, at the age of 75.

== Books ==
- We are All Brothers (1963)
- That Man is You (1964)
- We Dare To Say Our Father (1966)
- The Word of God: Homilies (1967)
- The Prayer of a Modern Man (1968)
- A Religion for Our Time (1969)
- Love your Neighbor (1969)
- The Gospels Without Myth: a Dramatic New Interpretation of the Gospels and Christian Dogma (1971)
- Suffering (1974)
- Teach Us How to Pray. (1974)
- Lovers in Marriage (1975)
- In the Christian spirit (1975)
