= Monastery of Iranzu =

Coordinates: 42.7506°N 2.03861°W

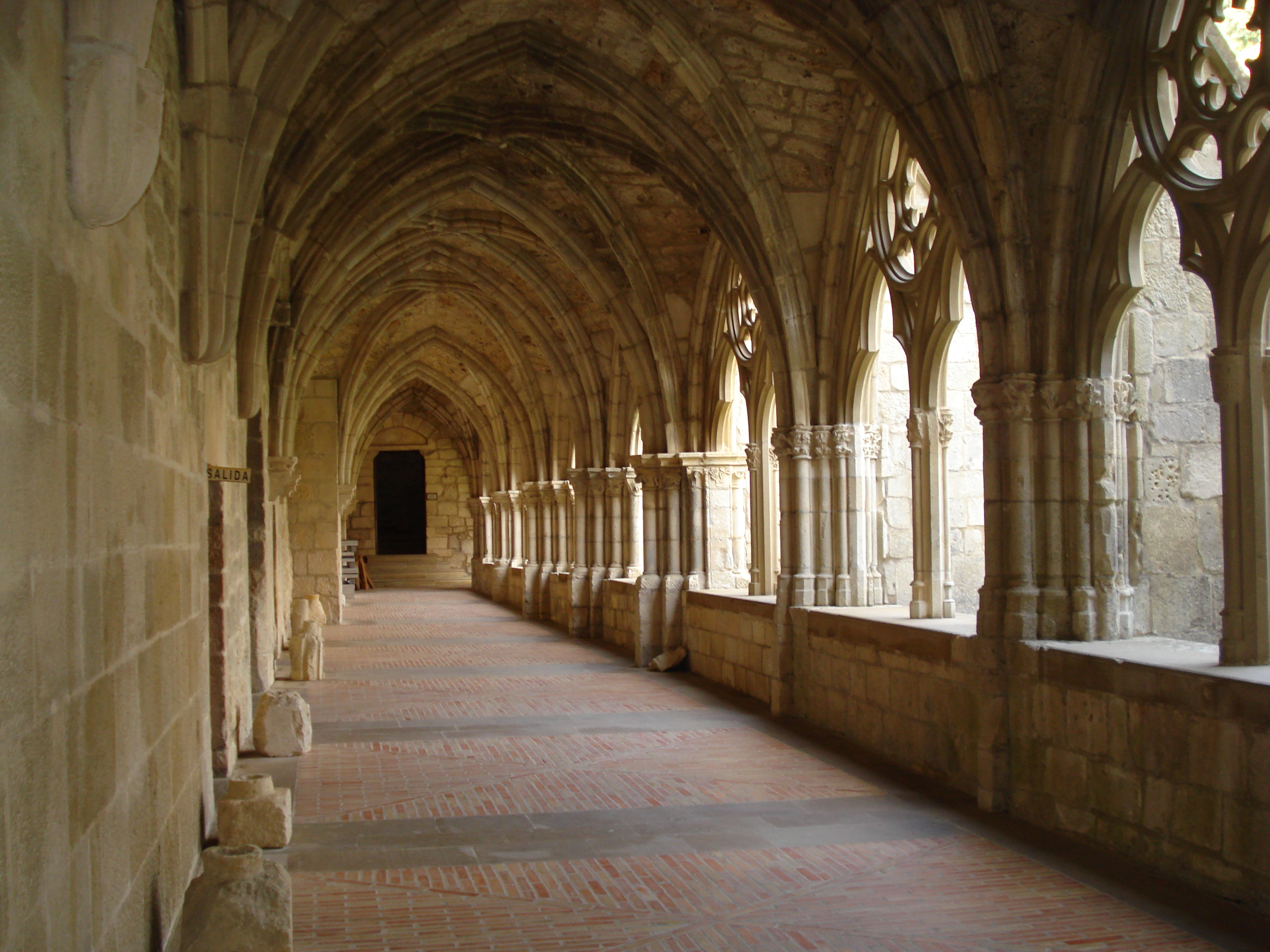
Cloister

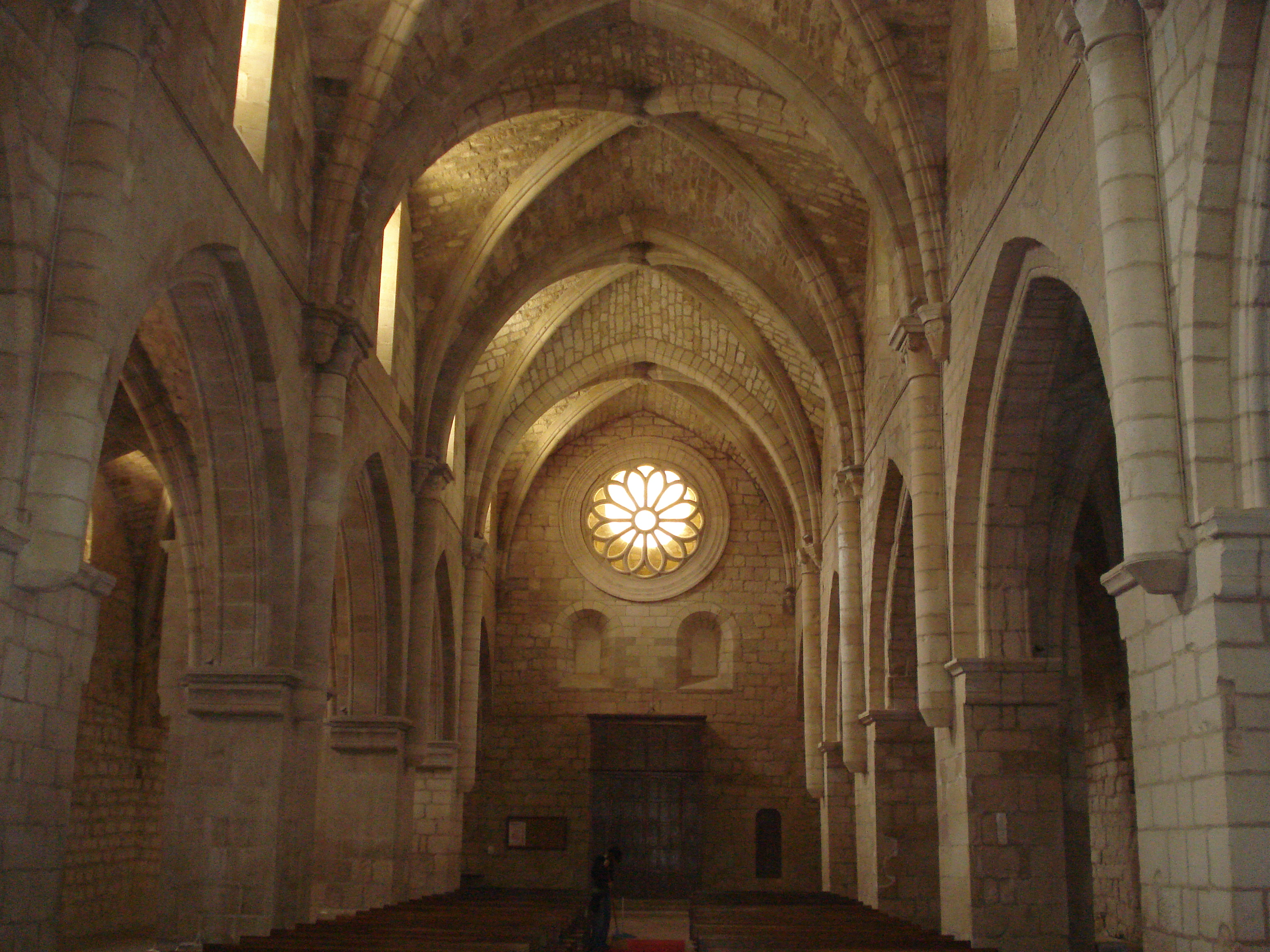
Church

The Royal Monastery of Saint Mary of Iranzu is a Roman Catholic monastery located in Abárzuza, Navarre, Spain. It was founded by Pedro de Artajona in the late 12th century, being Artajona's place of burial upon his death in 1193. The Cistercian Order had a large part in its building throughout the 12th century.

It was one of many Spanish monasteries dissolved in the 1830s, although in the first years of the decade it was protected by the Carlists. The monastery was dissolved in 1839 after the Convention of Vergara, and was confiscated by the State. It was abandoned and became ruinous until 1942, when the Provincial Government of Navarre refurbished it. One year after, a Theatine Fathers community was established there.

== Architecture ==
The Cistercian-style church was built during 12th century. The cloister is partly Cistercian (12th century) and partly Gothic (13-14th centuries). Additional minor Renaissance parts were added during 17th century.
