= Pilis Abbey =

Monastery

Coordinates: 47.69324°N 18.89103°E

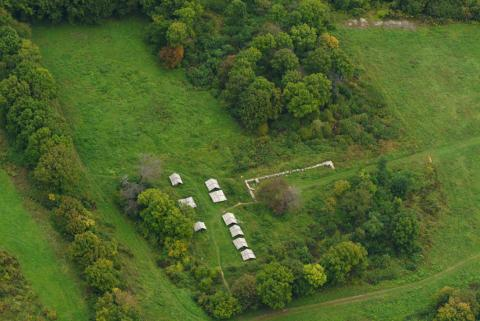
Pilisszentkereszt, ruins of Cistercian

Pilis Abbey (Hungarian: pilisi apátság) was a Cistercian monastery in the Pilis Hills in the Kingdom of Hungary. It was founded in 1184 by monks who came from Acey Abbey in France at the invitation of Béla III of Hungary. It was dedicated to the Virgin Mary.

== Sources ==
- Berend, Nora; Urbańczyk, Przemysław; Wiszewski, Przemysław (2013). Central Europe in the High Middle Ages: Bohemia, Hungary and Poland, c. 900-c. 1300. Cambridge University Press. ISBN 978-0-521-78156-5.
- Engel, Pál (2001). The Realm of St Stephen: A History of Medieval Hungary, 895–1526. I.B. Tauris Publishers. ISBN 1-86064-061-3.
- Hervay, Ferenc Levente; Marosi, Ernő (1994). "Pilis 3.". In Kristó, Gyula; Engel, Pál; Makk, Ferenc (eds.). Korai magyar történeti lexikon (9–14. század) [Encyclopedia of the Early Hungarian History (9th–14th centuries)] (in Hungarian). Akadémiai Kiadó. p. 546. ISBN 963-05-6722-9.
