= Montjoyer =

- Commune
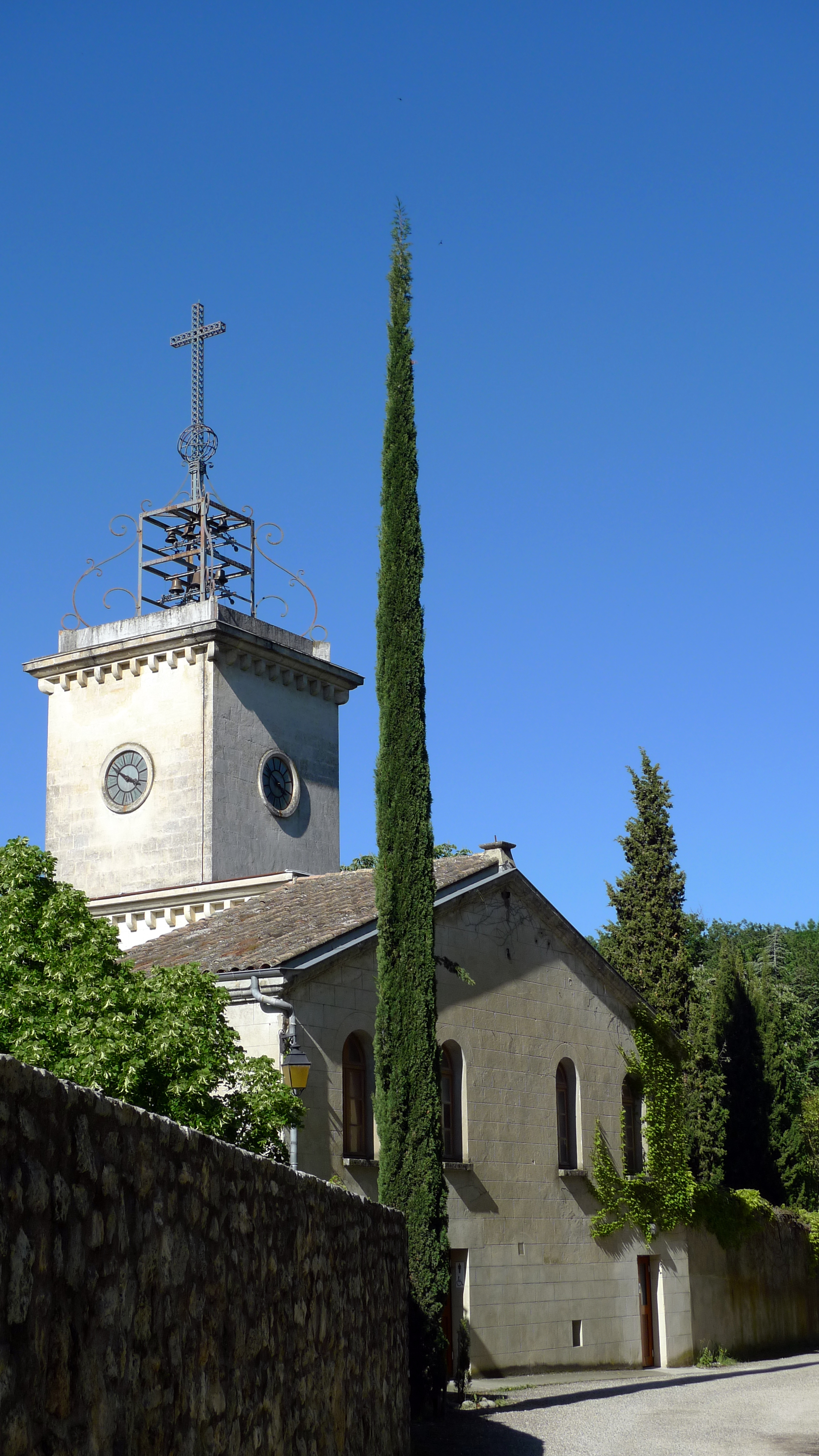
- Cistercian abbey of Notre-Dame d'Aiguebelle
- Location of Montjoyer
- Location within France Location within Auvergne-Rhône-Alpes
- Coordinates: 44°28′38″N 4°51′10″E
- Country: France
- Region: Auvergne-Rhône-Alpes
- Department: Drôme
- Arrondissement: Nyons
- Canton: Grignan

Government
  - Mayor (2020–2026): Marc Guy
- Area^{1}: 18.02 km^{2} (6.96 sq mi)
- Highest elevation: 472 m (1,549 ft)
- Lowest elevation: 200 m (660 ft)
- Population (2023): 275
  - Density: 15.3/km^{2} (39.5/sq mi)
- Time zone: UTC+01:00 (CET)
  - Summer (DST): UTC+02:00 (CEST)
- INSEE/Postal code: 26203 /26230
- ^{1} French Land Register data, which excludes lakes, ponds, glaciers > 1 km^{2} (0.386 sq mi or 247 acres) and river estuaries.

Montjoyer (French pronunciation: [mɔ̃ʒwaje]; Occitan: Montjoier) is a commune in the Drôme department in southeastern France.

== Population ==
Historical population
Year	Pop.	±% p.a.
1968	179	—
1975	159	−1.68%
1982	176	+1.46%
1990	198	+1.48%
1999	222	+1.28%
2007	281	+2.99%
2012	251	−2.23%
2017	286	+2.65%
2023	275	−0.65%
Source: INSEE

== See also ==
- Aiguebelle Abbey
- Communes of the Drôme department
