= Bellegarde-Sainte-Marie =

Bellegarde-Sainte-Marie Bèlagarda (Occitan)
- Commune
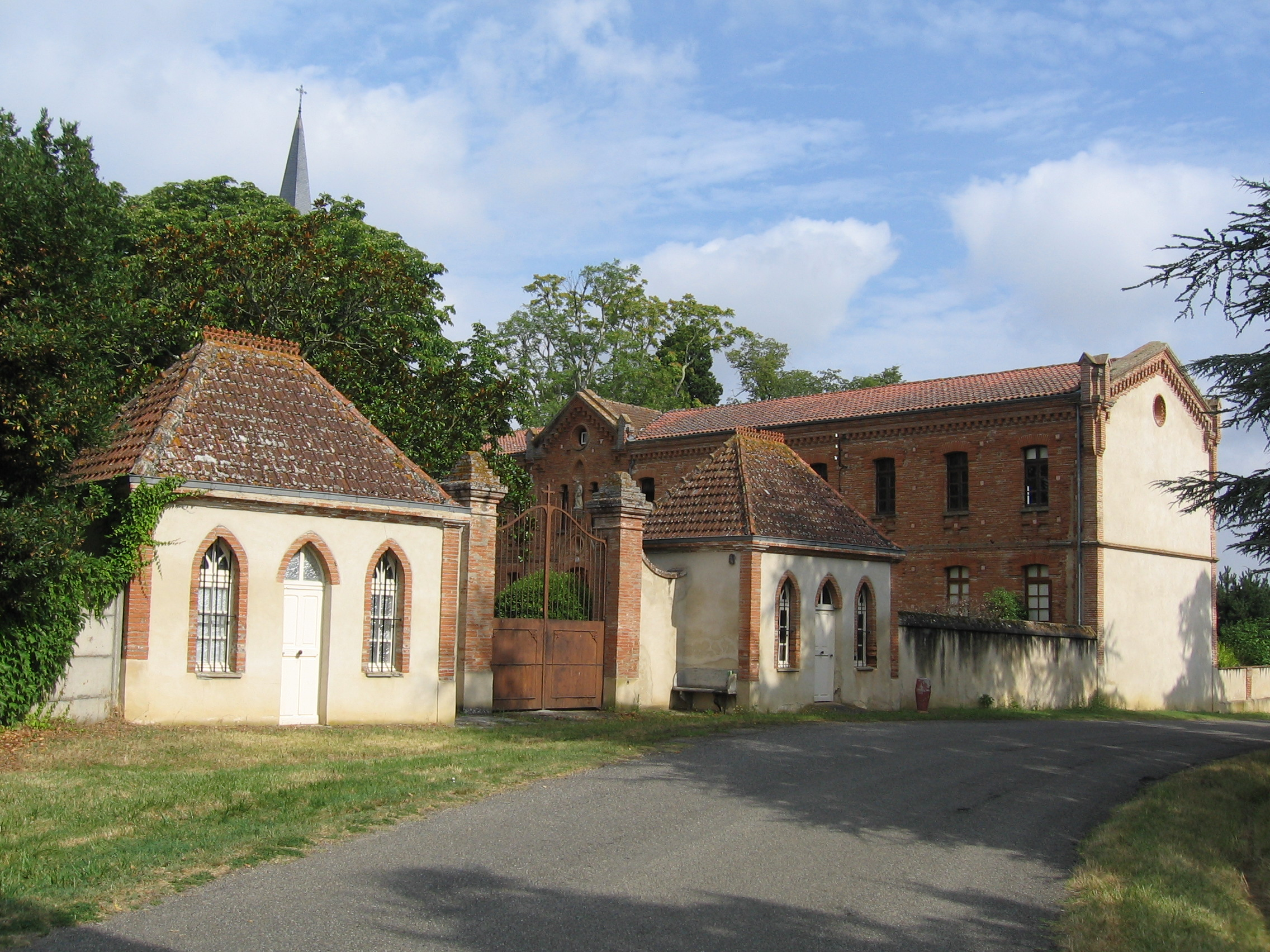
- The old entrance to the abbey in Bellegarde-Sainte-Marie
- Location of Bellegarde-Sainte-Marie
- Location within France Location within Occitanie
- Coordinates: 43°40′21″N 1°06′52″E
- Country: France
- Region: Occitania
- Department: Haute-Garonne
- Arrondissement: Toulouse
- Canton: Léguevin

Government
  - Mayor (2020–2026): Martine Cazeaux-Calvet
- Area^{1}: 11.66 km^{2} (4.50 sq mi)
- Elevation: 230 m (750 ft)
- Highest elevation: 285 m (935 ft)
- Lowest elevation: 139 m (456 ft)
- Population (2023): 204
  - Density: 17.5/km^{2} (45.3/sq mi)
- Time zone: UTC+01:00 (CET)
  - Summer (DST): UTC+02:00 (CEST)
- INSEE/Postal code: 31061 /31530
- ^{1} French Land Register data, which excludes lakes, ponds, glaciers > 1 km^{2} (0.386 sq mi or 247 acres) and river estuaries.

Bellegarde-Sainte-Marie (French pronunciation: [bɛlɡaʁd sɛ̃t maʁi]; Occitan: Bèragarda e Senta Maria) is a commune in the Haute-Garonne department in southwestern France.

== Population ==
Historical population
Year	Pop.	±% p.a.
1968	140	—
1975	158	+1.74%
1982	145	−1.22%
1990	162	+1.40%
1999	176	+0.93%
2007	194	+1.22%
2012	209	+1.50%
2017	192	−1.68%
2023	204	+1.02%
Source: INSEE

== See also ==
- Communes of the Haute-Garonne department
