= Viviano =

Viviano is both a surname and a masculine given name. It may refer to:

- Viviano, Bishop of Pamplona until 1163
- Benedict T. Viviano O.P. (born 1940), American scholar
- David Viviano (born 1971), Michigan Supreme Court Justice
- Emiliano Viviano (born 1985), Italian footballer
- Frank Viviano (born 1947), American journalist
- Sam Viviano (born 1953), American artist
- Viviano Codazzi (c.1606–1670), Italian painter
- Viviano Guida (born 1955), Italian footballer
