= Acey Abbey =

Trappist monastery in Jura, France

Coordinates: 47°15′42″N 5°39′25″E

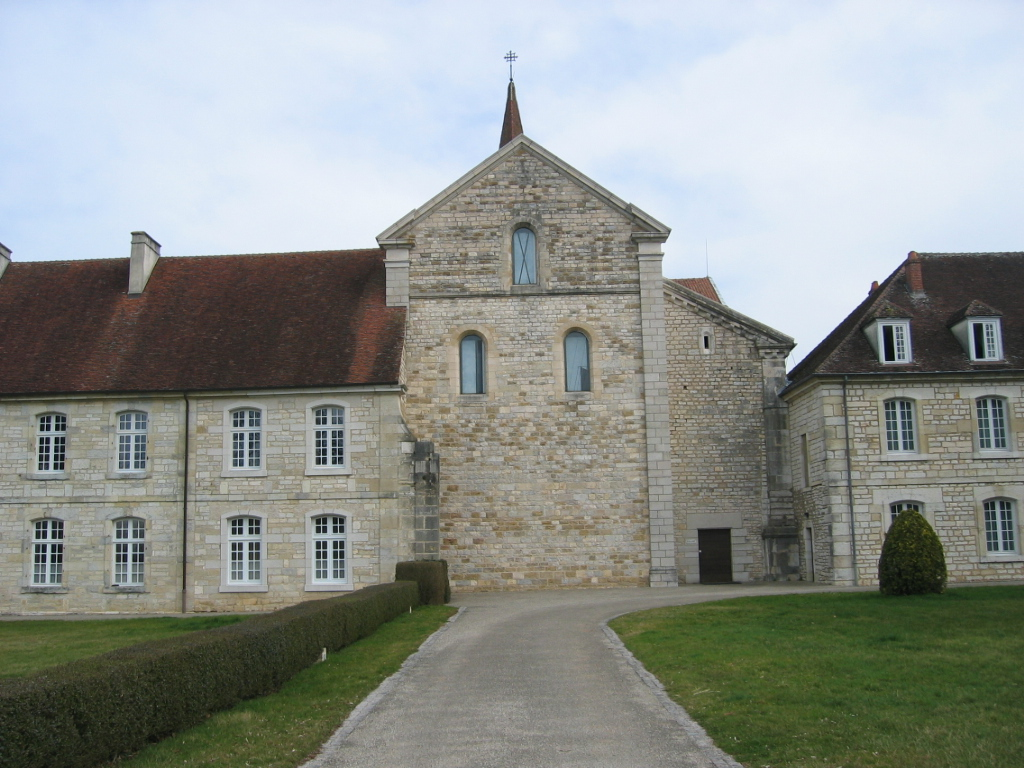
Acey Abbey

Acey Abbey (French: Abbaye d'Acey; Latin: Aceyum) is a Cistercian abbey founded in 1136, and occupied since 1873 by Trappist monks. It is located in Vitreux in the department of Jura, France, on the River Ognon, about 26 kilometres north-north-east of Dole and about 7 kilometres north of Gendrey.

== History ==
The abbey was built in 1136 at the instigation of the Archbishop of Besançon, Anseric de Montréal, and of Renaud III, Count of Burgundy, about 5 kilometres distant from an existing settlement of hermits. The initial community of monks were from Cherlieu Abbey, and Acey was therefore of the filiation of Clairvaux. The new foundation grew rapidly and had soon built six granges. In 1184 it was able to found a daughter house, Pilis Abbey in Hungary (dissolved in 1526). At the end of the Middle Ages it fell into the hands of commendatory abbots.

Its location on the boundary of the Free County of Burgundy and the Duchy of Burgundy caused it to be involved in warfare in 1435 and 1477, in 1569 during hostilities with Protestants and in 1595 under King Henry IV of France.

The 17th century brought more destruction. In 1650, 6 bays of the nave of the abbey church collapsed over a length of 30 metres. In 1683 the abbey burnt down. Between 1745 and 1771 extensive restoration took place.

The French Revolution brought its dissolution in 1790. Various uses of the premises followed, after the restoration of the monarchy mostly religious, until in 1873 the buildings were again occupied by a Cistercian community, in the form of Trappist monks from Aiguebelle Abbey. Between 1900 and 1910 the church was restored. In 1938 the community was again raised to the status of abbey. It is the only Cistercian foundation in Franche-Comté still used for its original purpose.

== Structures ==
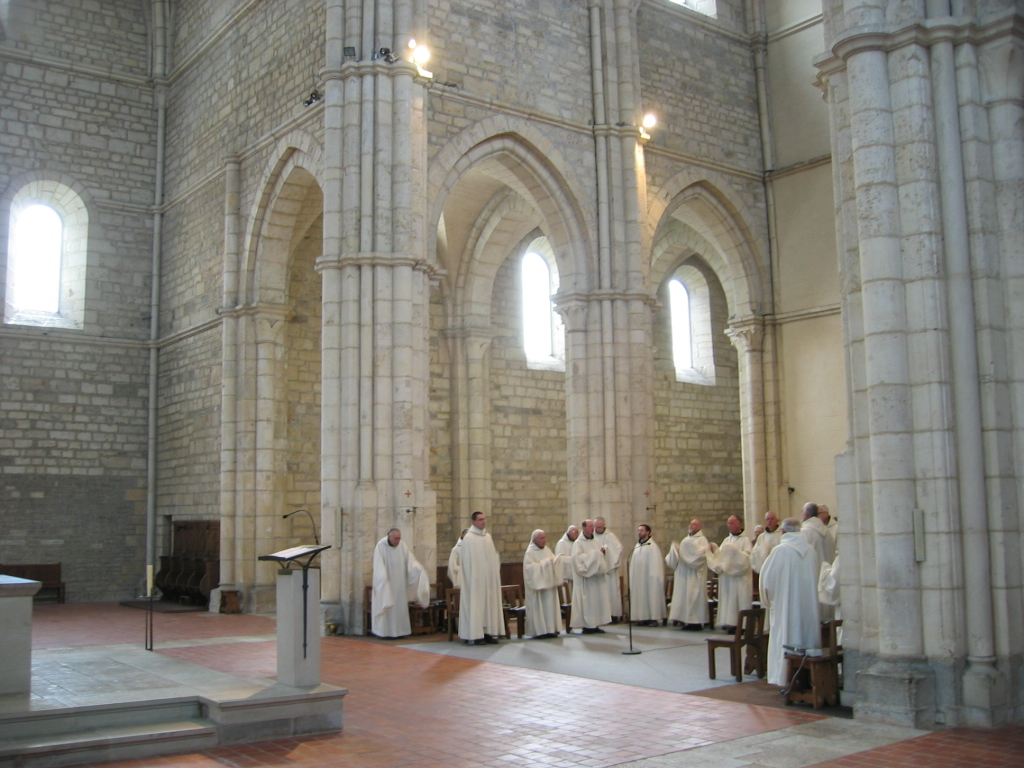
Interior of the abbey church

The 12th-century church, listed as a monument historique since 1971, has been restored. The nave has been partitioned after the second bay to provide an exhibition area. Including that, the nave has eight bays. There are two side aisles, a transept with two chapels on the east side of each arm, and a choir with a flat end wall. The cloister lies to the north of the church.

== Sources and external links ==
- Peugniez, Bernard, n.d.: Routier cistercien (2nd ed.), pp. 148–149. Editions Gaud: Moisenay ISBN 2-84080-044-6
- Acey Abbey official website (in French)
- Certosa di Firenze website: article on Acey Abbey with a few photos
