= Vitreux =

- Commune
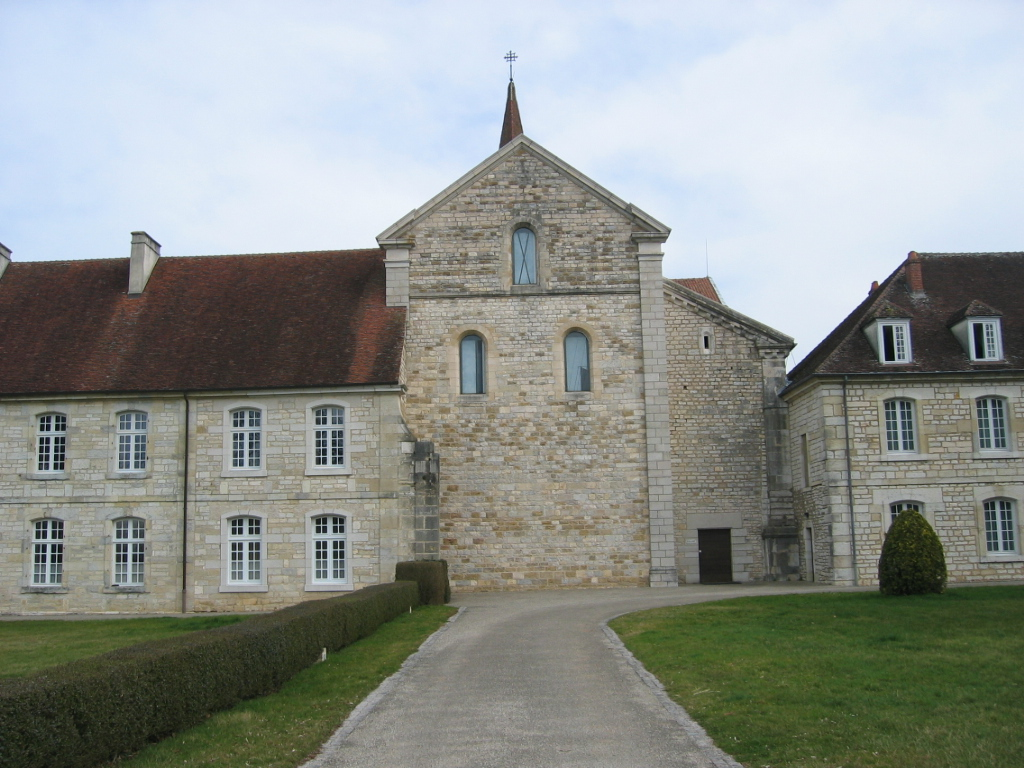
- Acey Abbey
- Location of Vitreux
- Location within France Location within Bourgogne-Franche-Comté
- Coordinates: 47°14′47″N 5°41′18″E
- Country: France
- Region: Bourgogne-Franche-Comté
- Department: Jura
- Arrondissement: Dole
- Canton: Authume

Government
  - Mayor (2020–2026): Alain Gomot
- Area^{1}: 7.85 km^{2} (3.03 sq mi)
- Highest elevation: 361 m (1,184 ft)
- Lowest elevation: 192 m (630 ft)
- Population (2023): 250
  - Density: 32/km^{2} (82/sq mi)
- Time zone: UTC+01:00 (CET)
  - Summer (DST): UTC+02:00 (CEST)
- INSEE/Postal code: 39581 /39350
- ^{1} French Land Register data, which excludes lakes, ponds, glaciers > 1 km^{2} (0.386 sq mi or 247 acres) and river estuaries.

Vitreux (French pronunciation: [vitʁø]) is a commune in the Jura department in the Bourgogne-Franche-Comté region in eastern France.

== Population ==
Historical population
Year	Pop.	±% p.a.
1968	154	—
1975	150	−0.38%
1982	190	+3.43%
1990	174	−1.09%
1999	209	+2.06%
2007	279	+3.68%
2012	257	−1.63%
2017	286	+2.16%
2023	250	−2.22%
Source: INSEE

== See also ==
- Acey Abbey
- Communes of the Jura department
